= Hog Island (Lincoln County, Maine) =

Island in Bremen, Maine, United States

Coordinates: 43°58′0″N 69°25′30″W

Hog Island is an island spanning 330 acres (130 ha) located in Muscongus Bay in Bremen, Maine, United States at the end of Keene Neck Road. It is a part of the Todd Wildlife Sanctuary, which includes an additional 30 acres (12 ha) on the mainland across from the island, as well as the current home to the Audubon Camp in Maine operated by the Seabird Restoration Program (Project Puffin) of the National Audubon Society.

== History ==
Hog Island has an agricultural history analogous to that of most Hog Islands. In the late nineteenth century, it was a summer home to The Point Breeze Inn and Bungalows, a recreational settlement. By 1910, Hog Island became a project of Mabel Loomis Todd, original editor of Emily Dickinson’s poetry. Todd purchased tracts of the island to save its timber from clearcutting. Together with her husband, David Peck Todd (head astronomer at Amherst College), they built a rustic summer camp there that was occupied by family members and their friends into the 1960s.

The only Todd child, daughter Millicent Todd Bingham, negotiated with John Baker of the National Audubon Society to have a nature study facility established on the island at the more developed Point Breeze site. The Audubon Nature Camp opened in the summer of 1936. The staff included Roger Tory Peterson, noted author of the new Peterson Field Guide series and director Carl W. Buchheister, who would go on to serve as president of the National Audubon Society from 1959 to 1967.

== Hog Island Audubon Camp ==
From late May through September, Audubon's Seabird Institute/Project Puffin runs a six-day residential ornithology and environmental education programs for adults, teens, families, environmental educators and Audubon leaders. For more information about these camp sessions, visit https://hogisland.audubon.org/

== See also ==
- List of islands of Maine
