= Cross Island National Wildlife Refuge =

Protected area in Maine, United States

- IUCN category IV (habitat/species management area)
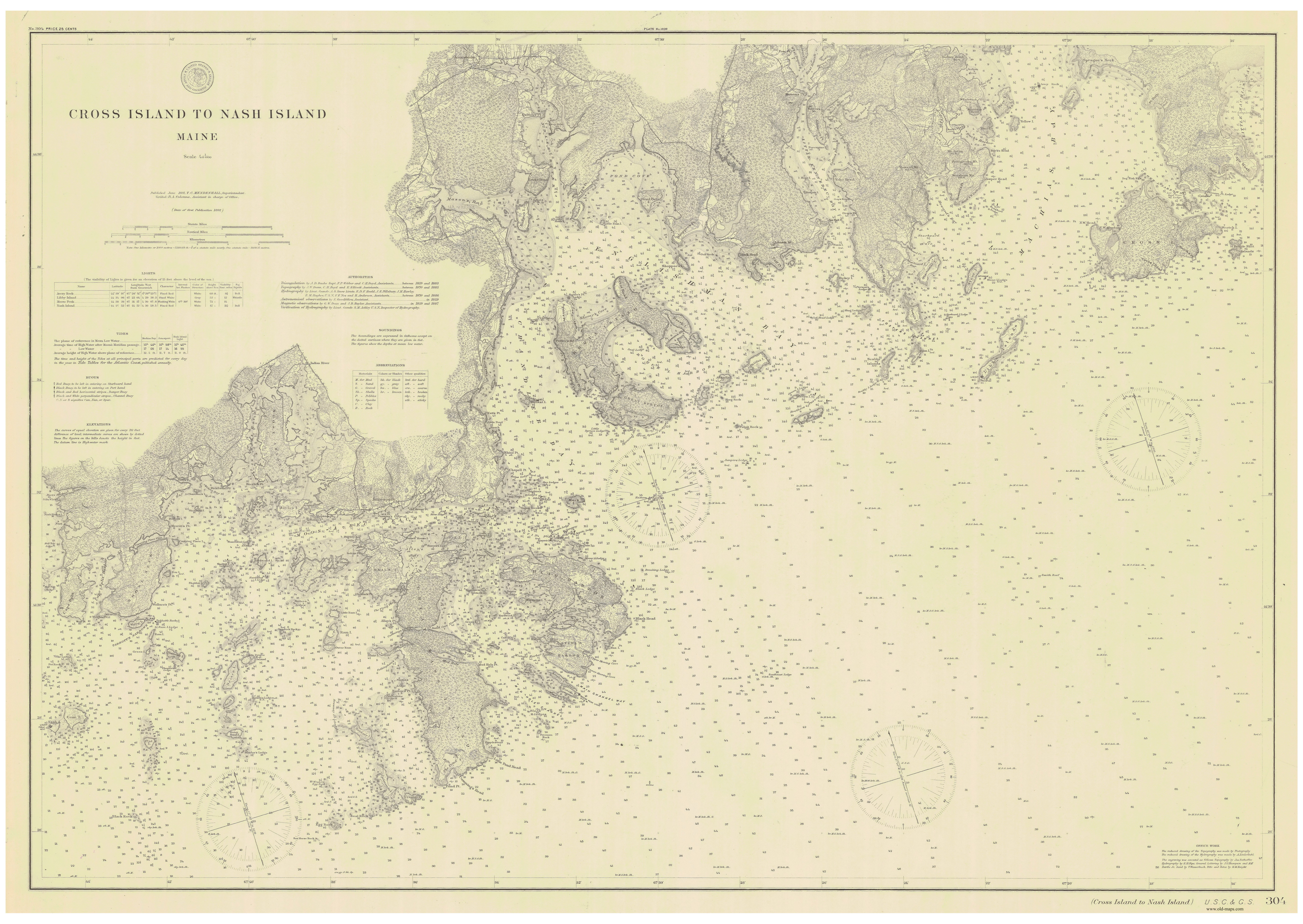
- Chart of 1891

- Location within the United States
- Location: Washington County, Maine, United States
- Nearest city: Machiasport, Maine
- Coordinates: 44.60841°N 67.29943°W
- Area: 1,700 acres (6.9 km^{2})
- Established: 1980
- Governing body: U.S. Fish and Wildlife Service
- Website: Cross Island National Wildlife Refuge

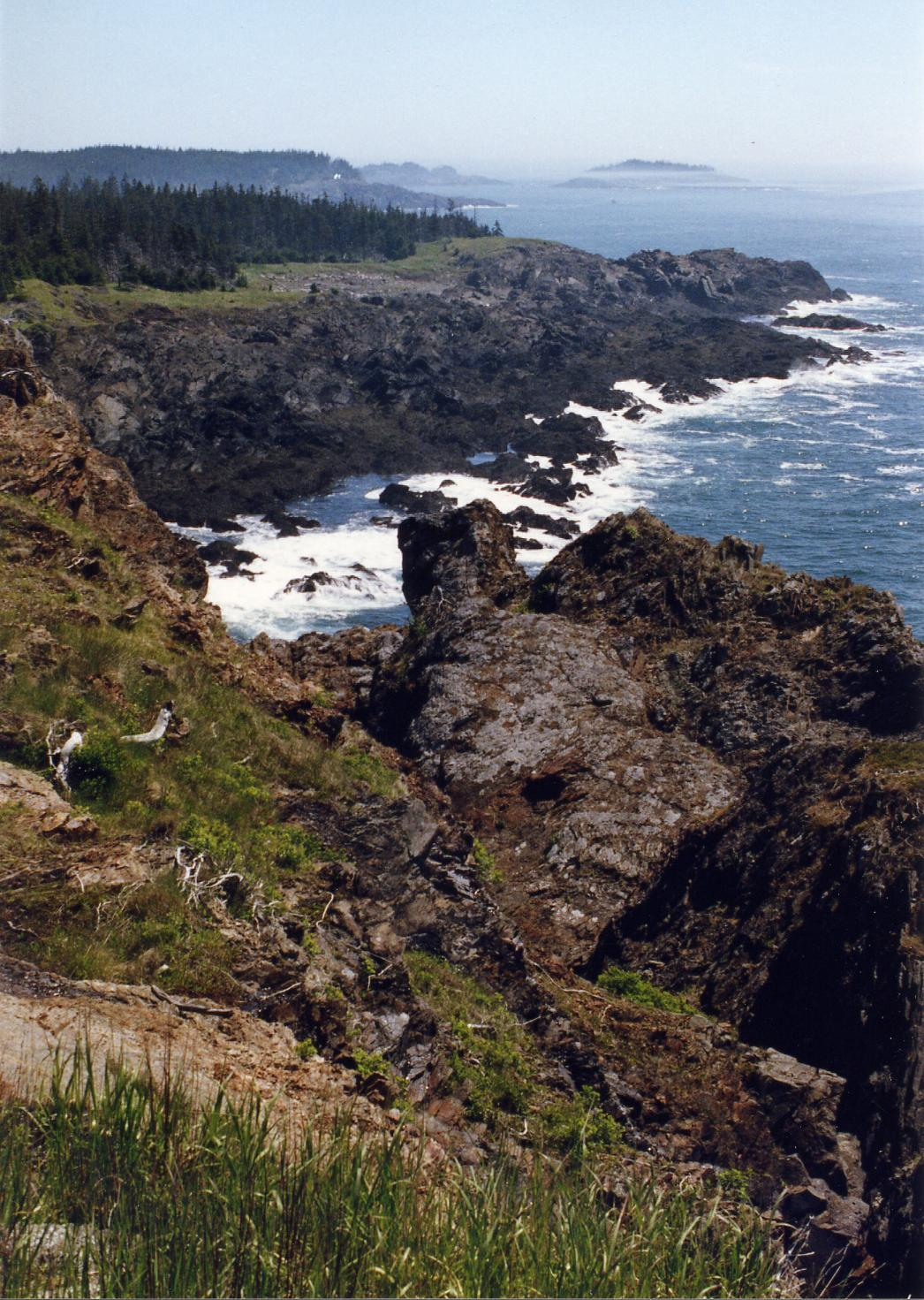
Rugged shoreline of Cross Island

Cross Island National Wildlife Refuge is a National Wildlife Refuge in the state of Maine. It is one of the five refuges that together make up the Maine Coastal Islands National Wildlife Refuge, along with Petit Manan, Franklin Island, Seal Island, and Pond Island.

Cross Island NWR has a surface area of 1,700 acres (6.9 km^{2}). It is part of the Town of Cutler.

== Islands ==
Cross Island National Wildlife Refuge consists of six islands:

- Cross Island - 1,489 acres (603 ha)
- Scotch Island - 10 acres (4.0 ha)
- Outer Double Head Shot - 14 acres (5.7 ha)
- Inner Double Head Shot - 8 acres (3.2 ha)
- Mink Island - 11 acres (4.5 ha)
- Old Man Island - 6 acres (2.4 ha), in 1908 the site of an attempt to save the endanger eider ducks.

== See also ==
- List of islands of Maine
