= Maine Coastal Islands National Wildlife Refuge =

Protected area in Maine, United States

Maine Coastal Islands National Wildlife Refuge contains more than 50 offshore islands and four coastal parcels, totaling more than 8,100 acres. The complex spans more than 250 miles (400 km) of Maine coastline and includes five national wildlife refuges—Petit Manan, Cross Island, Franklin Island, Seal Island, and Pond Island. The U.S. Fish and Wildlife Service manages the refuge complex as part of the National Wildlife Refuge System.

The Service's primary focus at Maine Coastal Islands Refuge is restoring and managing colonies of nesting seabirds. Refuge islands provide habitat for common, Arctic, and endangered roseate terns; Atlantic puffins; razorbills; black guillemots; Leach's storm-petrels; herring, greater black-backed, and laughing gulls; double-crested and great cormorants; and common eiders. Over the last 25 years, the Service has worked to reverse the decline in these birds' populations. As a result, many species have returned to islands where they nested historically.

In addition to seabirds, wading birds and bald eagles nest on refuge islands. The mainland divisions provide habitat for songbirds, shorebirds, and waterfowl, as well as opportunities for bird watching and hiking.

== Wildlife and Habitat ==
Maine Coastal Islands National Wildlife Refuge consists of four mainland divisions (4,277 acres) and 50 islands (3,895 acres). The refuge islands span over 250 miles (400 km) of the Maine coast and support a tremendous diversity of wildlife. The majority of the islands within the refuge are considered nationally significant nesting islands, and support endangered and threatened species, colonial nesting seabirds, wading birds, and waterfowl. Habitat characteristics vary considerably among the islands. While some islands provide dense stands of red spruce and balsam fir for nesting bald eagles and wading birds, other islands provide great expanses of mixed grasses and raspberries which support nesting terns, common eiders, and a number of neotropical migrants. The rocky ledges surrounding the islands provide nesting habitat for Atlantic puffins, razorbills, and black guillemots. The inter-tidal areas surrounding the islands and mainland properties provide an abundance of invertebrates for migratory and wintering waterfowl and shorebirds. The diversity of upland habitats and the extensive inter-tidal habitats combine to provide foraging, breeding, and migratory habitat for over 320 species of birds.

Eight of the islands within Maine Coastal Islands National Wildlife Refuge currently support seabird restoration projects. The primary focus of these projects is to re-establish breeding populations of common, Arctic, and roseate terns, Atlantic puffins, and razorbills on historic nesting islands. The combined efforts of the Refuge and our conservation partners have proven highly successful, and all five species have experienced significant population growth as a result of our efforts.

The four mainland units are located in the Towns of Corea, Gouldsboro, Steuben, and Milbridge, Maine, and also provide a diversity of habitat for a wide variety of species. The majority of habitat on all four parcels is dominated by mature forest, but the refuge also protects several salt marshes, a diverse mix of freshwater wetlands, and several grassland and blueberry fields. The freshwater wetlands on Petit Manan Point are used by thousands of migratory waterfowl during the fall months.

== Refuges ==
- Cross Island National Wildlife Refuge
- Franklin Island National Wildlife Refuge
- Petit Manan National Wildlife Refuge
- Pond Island National Wildlife Refuge
- Seal Island National Wildlife Refuge

== Lighthouses ==
Several lighthouse islands have been transferred from the U.S. Coast Guard to the Maine Coastal Islands NWR, in recognition of the nesting seabird habitat they provide.

- Egg Rock Light (Maine)
- Libby Island Light
- Matinicus Rock Light
- Petit Manan Light
- Pond Island Light
- Two Bush Island Light
