= Franklin Island National Wildlife Refuge =

Protected area in Maine, United States

- IUCN category IV (habitat/species management area)
- Location within the United States
- Location: Knox County, Maine, United States
- Nearest city: Friendship, Maine
- Coordinates: 43.891°N 69.3741°W
- Area: 12 acres (4.9 ha)
- Established: 1973
- Governing body: U.S. Fish and Wildlife Service
- Website: Franklin Island National Wildlife Refuge

Franklin Island National Wildlife Refuge is a National Wildlife Refuge on Franklin Island outside Muscongus Bay in the state of Maine, United States. It is one of the five refuges that together make up the Maine Coastal Islands National Wildlife Refuge, along with Petit Manan, Cross Island, Seal Island, and Pond Island.

Franklin Island NWR has a surface area of 12 acres (4.9 ha). It is one of the smallest refuges in the United States National Wildlife Refuge system. It is part of the Town of Friendship.

The U.S. Government acquired Franklin Island in 1806 and completed construction of the Franklin Island Light in 1808. This was the third lighthouse built in Maine. The U.S. Lighthouse Service and its successor, the U.S. Coast Guard, continued to staff the lighthouse for 160 years before the station was automated in 1967. The U.S. Fish and Wildlife Service acquired Franklin Island in 1973, making this the first island acquired for the Petit Manan National Wildlife Refuge Complex.

Franklin Island once supported one of the largest common eider colonies in Maine. The eider colony was decimated by avian cholera in the mid-1980s. The population has slowly recovered, and a 2003 survey documented over 330 pairs of eiders and over 100 pairs of great black-backed and herring gulls.

Franklin Island is closed to public use during the seabird nesting season: April–August. It is open during daylight hours the rest of the year.
