= Pond Island National Wildlife Refuge =

Protected area in Maine, United States

- IUCN category IV (habitat/species management area)
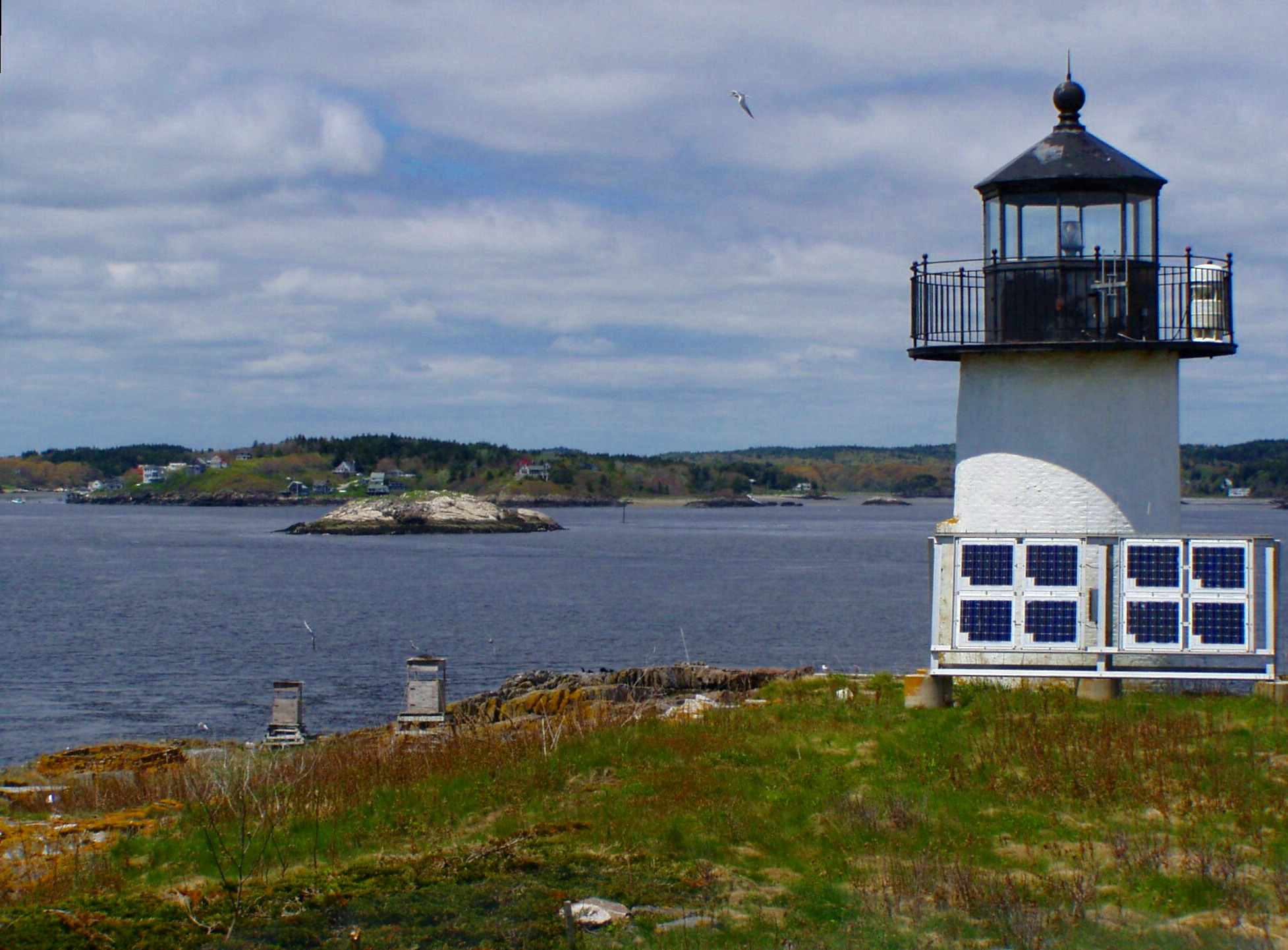
- Pond Island National Wildlife Refuge

- Location within the United States
- Location: Sagadahoc County, Maine, United States
- Nearest city: Phippsburg, Maine
- Coordinates: 43°44′20″N 69°46′15″W
- Area: 10 acres (4.0 ha)
- Established: 1973
- Governing body: U.S. Fish and Wildlife Service
- Website: Pond Island National Wildlife Refuge

Pond Island National Wildlife Refuge is a National Wildlife Refuge in the state of Maine, United States. It is one of the five refuges that together make up the Maine Coastal Islands National Wildlife Refuge, along with Petit Manan, Cross Island, Franklin Island, and Seal Island. Pond Island NWR is an island in the mouth of the Kennebec River adjacent to Popham Beach.

Pond Island NWR has a surface area of 10 acres (4.0 ha). It is one of the smallest refuges in the United States National Wildlife Refuge system. It is part of the Town of Phippsburg.
