= Back River (Medomak River tributary) =

Coordinates: 44°0′50″N 69°21′30″W

Location
- Country: United States

Physical characteristics
- Source
  - location: Maine
- Mouth
  - elevation: sea level

The Back River is a 1.7-mile-long (2.7 km) river in Friendship, Maine, which empties into the estuary of the Medomak River.

== See also ==
- List of rivers of Maine
