= NGC 3134 =

Spiral galaxy

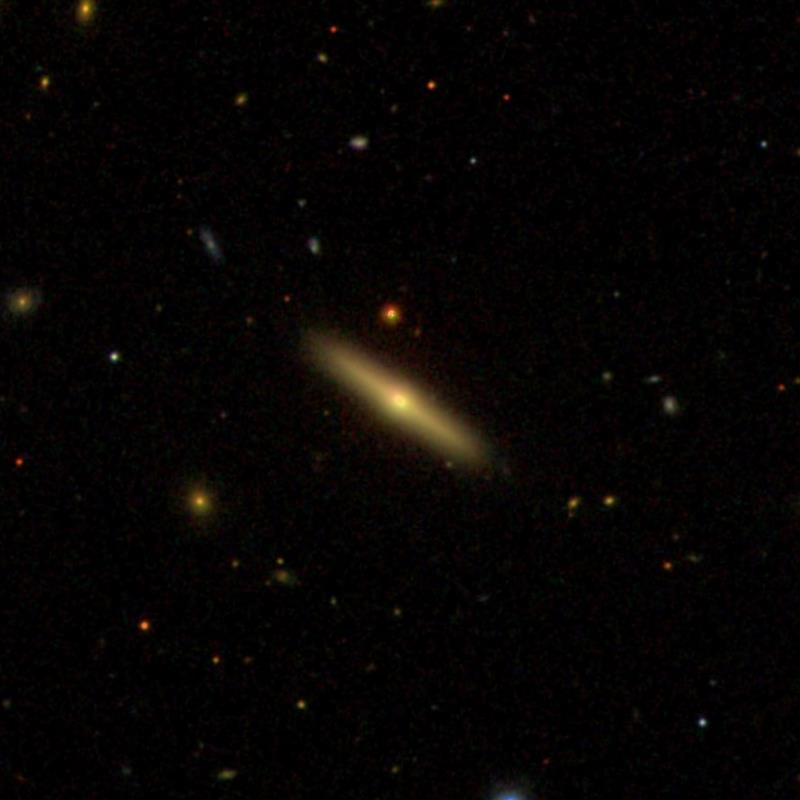

Observation data
- Constellation: Leo
- Right ascension: 10^{h} 13^{m} 52^{s}
- Declination: +12° 14′ 54″
- Distance: 250,000,000
- Apparent magnitude (V): 14.8

Characteristics
- Type: barred spiral galaxy
- Size: 80,000-85,000 LY
- Apparent size (V): 1.49' x 0.4'

Other designations
- MCG 2-26-31, Todd 21, PGC 29722, Z 64-88

NGC 3134 is a barred spiral galaxy in Leo. It is classified as a type S0 galaxy. It was discovered by David Peck Todd on 6 February 1878, while attempting to discover a trans-neptunian planet. He described it as "very faint, disc", and named it Todd 21. A nearby star, named Todd 21b, was a potential candidate for said planet and was measured 24 times to attempt to identify if it was moving. With many accurate measurements of Todd 21b, this was able to help prove Todd 21 was NGC 3134.
