= NGC 3436 =

Spiral galaxy

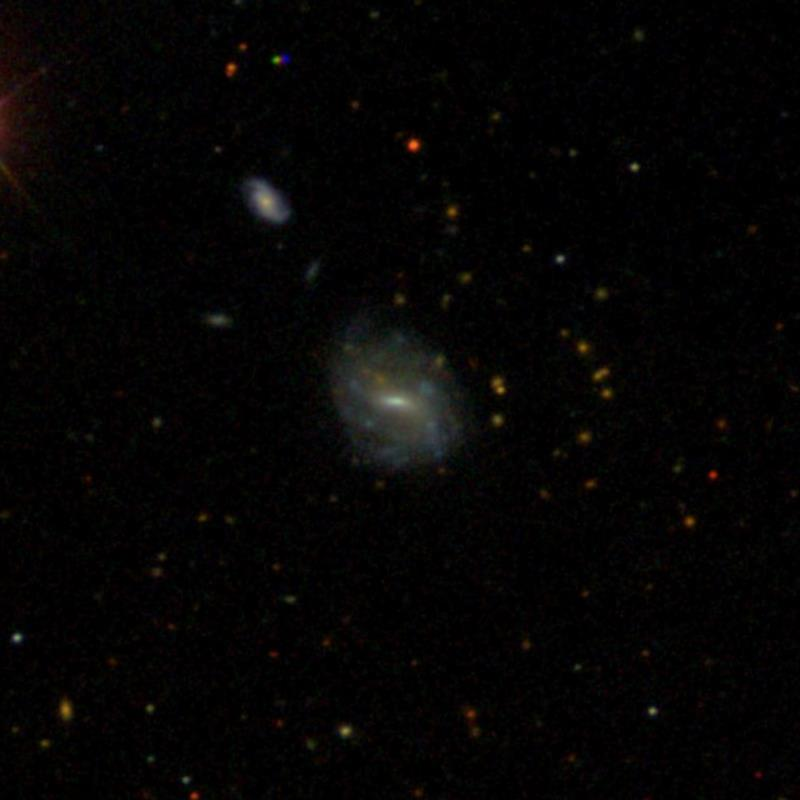

Observation data
- Right ascension: 10^{h} 53^{m} 48^{s}
- Declination: +07° 57′ 21″
- Distance: 290,000,000
- Apparent magnitude (V): 14.1

Characteristics
- Type: Spiral galaxy
- Apparent size (V): 0.86' x 0.6'

Other designations
- CGCG 038-039, PGC 32633, LEDA 31905, Todd (#6), Mrk 1266

NGC 3436 is a spiral galaxy in the constellation Leo. It is classified as a type SAa galaxy. It was discovered by David P. Todd on the 30th of November, 1877 while he was searching for a trans-neptunian planet.

It has a diameter of about 60,000 light years. It has a radial velocity of 6,894 ±25 km/s
