= Millicent Todd Bingham =

American geographer, Emily Dickinson scholar

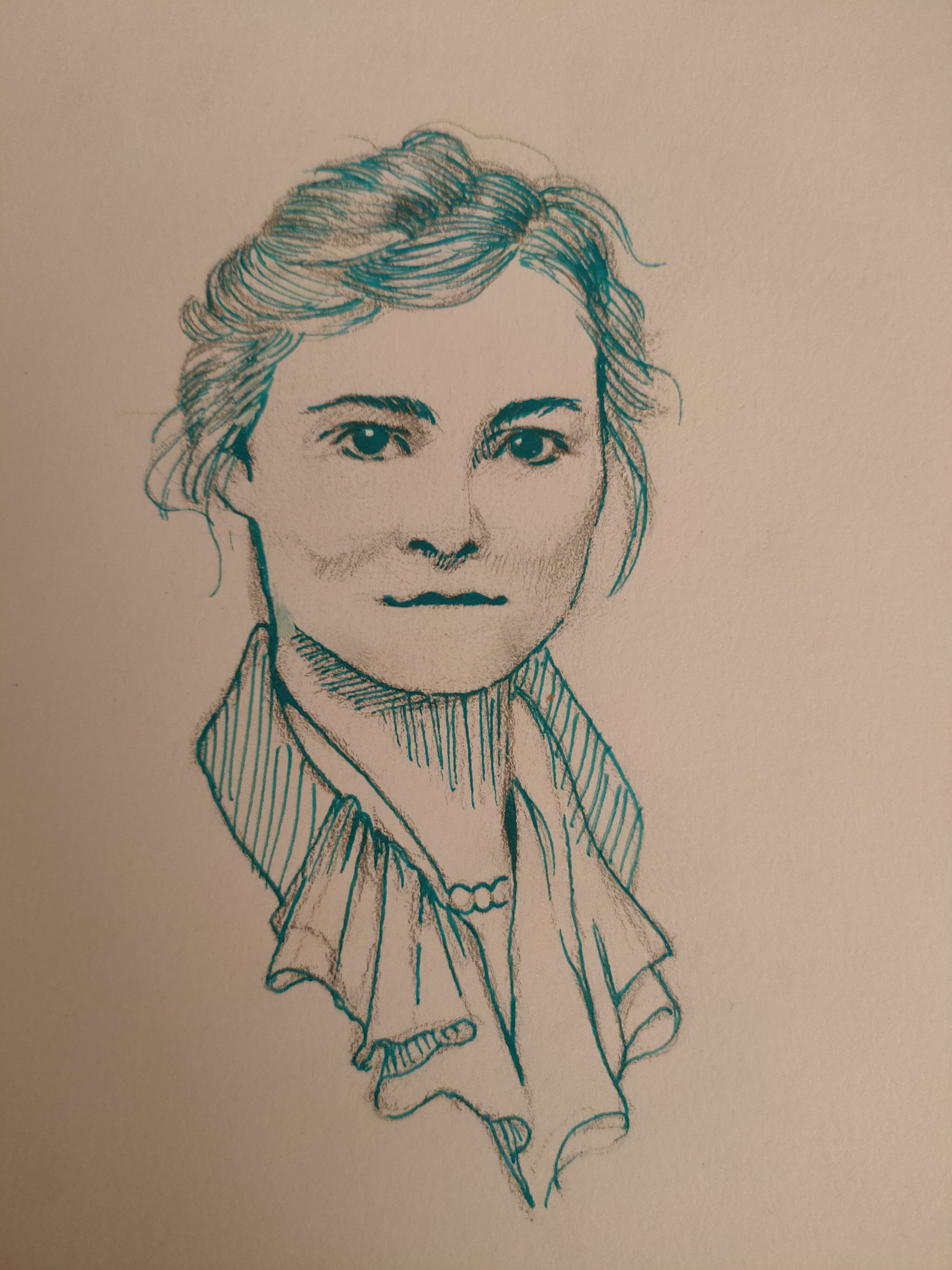
- Born: Millicent Todd; February 5, 1880; Washington, D.C., U.S.
- Died: December 1, 1968 (aged 88); Washington, D.C., U.S.
- Burial place: Arlington National Cemetery
- Education: Vassar College (A.B.), Radcliffe College (M.A.), Harvard University (PhD)
- Occupation: Geographer
- Known for: Emily Dickinson publications
- Spouse: Walter Van Dyke Bingham
- Parents: David Peck Todd (father); Mabel Loomis (mother)

Millicent Todd Bingham (1880–1968) was an American geographer and the first woman to receive a doctorate in geology and geography from Harvard. She was also a leading expert on the poet Emily Dickinson.

== Biography ==
Born Millicent Todd on February 5, 1880, in Washington, D.C., she was the only child of astronomer David Peck Todd and writer and editor Mabel Loomis Todd.

Millicent attended Mrs. Stearns' School in Amherst, Massachusetts, and Miss Hersey's School for Girls in Boston, founded by Heloise Hersey, before beginning her university studies at Vassar College, Poughkeepsie, New York, where she was awarded an A.B. in liberal arts in 1902. For a short time, she became an instructor of French, first at Vassar (1902–1904) and then at Wellesley College (1906–1907). During her years of travels with her family, she studied at the Sorbonne, University of Paris (1905–1906), and at the University of Berlin (1909–1910).

Millicent Todd Bingham teaching French to American troops in France.

After returning to Massachusetts she earned her M.A. in geography at Radcliffe College, Cambridge, Massachusetts in 1917 and then left for Europe that same year to join the war-relief efforts there and worked at a hospital as part of the women's auxiliary of the YMCA, and lectured to American soldiers at the University of Grenoble, about the geography of France as part of the U.S. Army Education Corps.

She married psychologist Walter Van Dyke Bingham (1880–1952) on December 4, 1920, and she earned her Ph.D. at Harvard University in 1923. By doing so, she became the first woman at Harvard to earn a doctorate in geology and geography.

=== Geographer ===
Millicent Bingham's early interest in geography was encouraged by her father, an astronomy professor at Amherst College known as an "eclipse chaser," a passion that took him around the world. As a young woman, she accompanied him on international astronomical expeditions, traveling to the Dutch East Indies (1901), Tripoli (1905), Chile and Peru (1907), and Kiev, Ukraine (1914). Later, her doctoral dissertation was based on her research about of Peru's rugged and varied geography. Millicent worked with French geographer Raoul Blanchard on his theories of regional geography, and helped to translate his seminar The Geography of France. In the late 1940s, she was nominated for membership in the Association of American Geographers.

=== Dickinson scholar ===
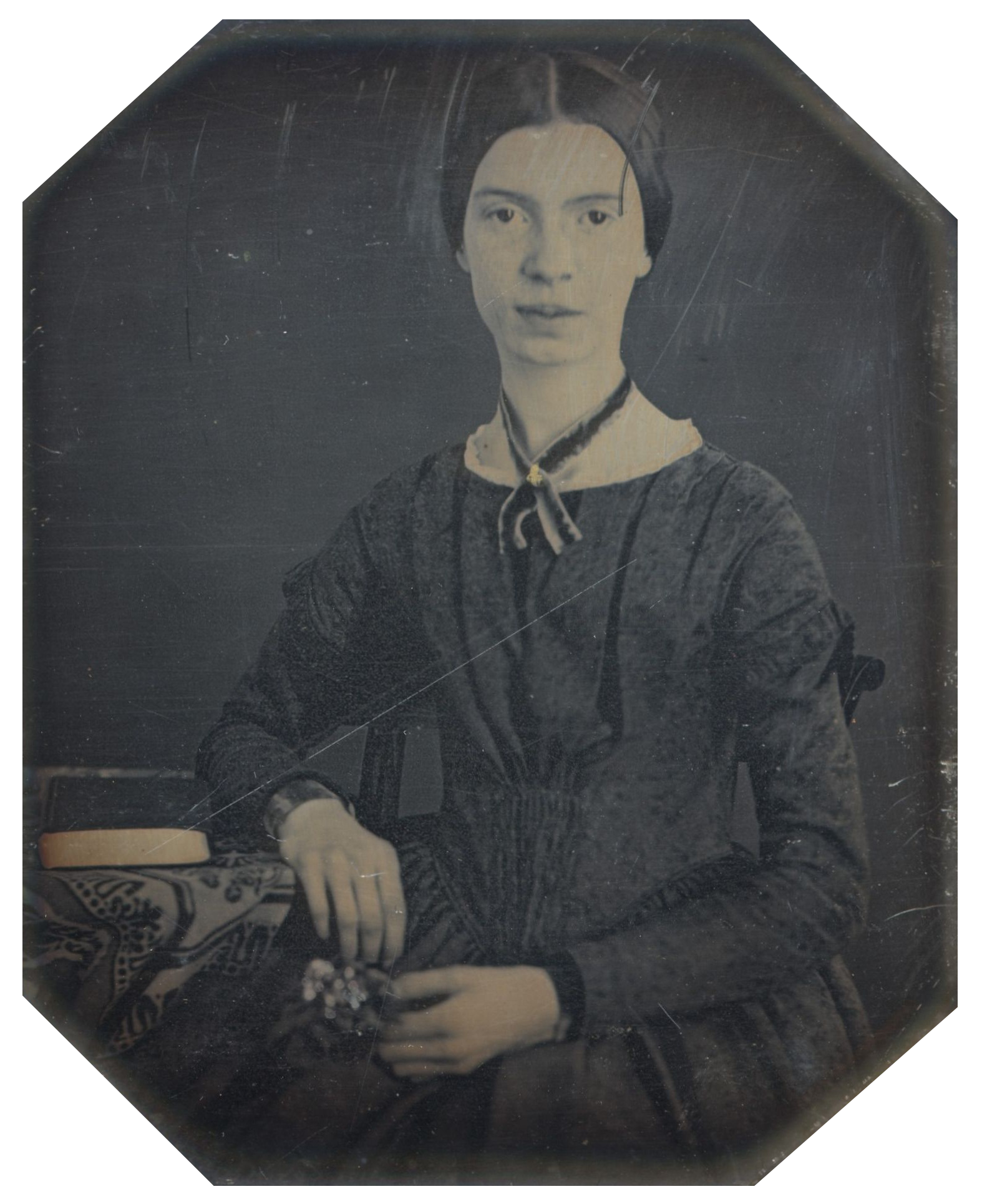
Daguerreotype of Emily Dickinson, c. early 1847. It is presently located in Amherst College Archives & Special Collections.

In 1931, after Millicent returned from an international geographical congress in Paris, her mother revealed that she was in possession of a Chinese camphorwood chest containing more than 600 unpublished poems and letters written by the recluse, Emily Dickinson. By that time her mother, Mabel Loomis Todd had collaborated with Thomas Wentworth Higginson to edit and publish many Dickinson works after the poet's death in 1886. (During Dickinson's lifetime, only a dozen poems and letters were published.) However, for more than 30 years, because of her complex relationships with members of the Dickinson family, Mabel declined to publish any of the poems or letters in her possession.

In 1931, Mabel asked Millicent to help her publish the remaining poems and letters, but Mabel died soon thereafter, in 1932. According to archives at Yale, after her mother's death, Bingham very reluctantly "abandoned her career in geography to begin what became a personal crusade to publish Emily Dickinson's manuscripts and to bolster Mabel Loomis Todd's reputation as the person most responsible for bringing Emily Dickinson's poetry to public attention."

As a result of Bingham's research, editorial work and publishing efforts, she authored three books about the life and work of Emily Dickinson, and one further book of her poetry. A voluminous collection of Bingham's papers is housed at Yale University.

=== Conservationist ===
From her mother, Bingham inherited two properties, which she donated for public use. She bequeathed an 87-acre wooded area, located on Mount Orient in Pelham, Massachusetts, to Amherst College in 1960 as the Mabel Loomis Todd Forest. Her mother had purchased the tract in 1909 hoping to "preserve it from commercial exploitation."

The larger gift surrounded the Todd family retreat on Hog Island in Muscongus Bay, Maine. Bingham presented the property to the National Audubon Society, to be called the Todd Wildlife Sanctuary, as a perpetual preserve in 1960. According to Morgan, Bingham's donations have cemented her role as a lifelong conservationist.

=== Later years ===
Bingham received honorary degrees from Dickinson College in 1952, and from Amherst College in 1957.

In 1959, reflecting on the diverse directions her career had taken, Bingham wrote the following in the Radcliffe Quarterly.

During the work of a quarter of a century and more I have discovered one supreme fact, namely that in renouncing my study of the wonder and mystery of creation, the mystery has not departed. Emily Dickinson remains. The wonder as revealed in earth and sea and sky is not as remote from the life of one woman in a New England village as it might seem.

Bingham died in Washington, D.C., on December 1, 1968, at age 88 and is buried at Arlington National Cemetery in Virginia next to her husband, a World War I veteran.

== Selected works ==
Bingham published works on subjects that included geography, Emily Dickinson, psychology, friends and family.

- Bingham, Millicent Todd. Peru: A Land of Contrasts. Little, Brown, and Company, 1914.
- Blanchard, Raoul, and Millicent Todd Bingham (translator). Geography of France. Rand McNally, 1919.
- Bingham, Millicent Todd. "Solar eclipse photography." Popular Astronomy 31 (1923): 631.
- Vidal de La Blache, Paul, Emmanuel de Martonne, and Millicent Todd Bingham (translator). "Principles of human geography." (1926).
- Bingham, Millicent Todd. Mabel Loomis Todd, Her Contributions to the Town of Amherst. Priv. print.[George Grady Press], 1935.
- Todd, Mabel Loomis, and Millicent Todd Bingham. Bolts of Melody: New Poems of Emily Dickinson. New York: Harper & Brothers, 1945.
- Bingham, Millicent Todd, and Emily Dickinson. "Poems of Emily Dickinson: Hitherto Published Only in Part." New England Quarterly (1947): 3–50.
- Bingham, Millicent Todd. "Miami: A Study in Urban Geography." Tequesta 9 (1948): 73–107.
- Bingham, Millicent Todd. "Emily Dickinson's Handwriting—A Master Key." New England Quarterly (1949): 229–234.
- Bingham, Millicent Todd. "Beyond psychology." Homo sapiens auduboniensis: A tribute to Walter Van Dyke Bingham (1953): 5–29.
- Bingham, Millicent Todd. "Prose Fragments of Emily Dickinson." New England Quarterly (1955): 291–318.
- Bingham, Millicent Todd. Emily Dickinson's Home: The Early Years as Revealed in Family Correspondence and Reminiscences. New York, Dover, 1955.
- Todd, Mabel Loomis, and Millicent Todd Bingham. The Thoreau Family Two Generations Ago.(Foreword and Footnotes by Millicent Todd Bingham.)[With a Portrait.]. Berkeley Heights, NJ, 1958.
- Bingham, Millicent Todd. "Key West in the Summer of 1864." The Florida Historical Quarterly 43.3 (1965): 262–265.
- Bingham, Millicent Todd. Ancestors' Brocades: The Literary Discovery of Emily Dickinson, the Editing and Publication of Her Letters and Poems. Vol. 1773. New York: Dover Publications, 1967.
