= Project Puffin =

Coordinates: 43.8606389°N 69.3819911°W

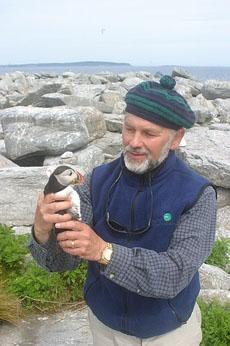
Stephen Kress and a puffin on Eastern Egg Rock

Project Puffin is an effort initiated by Dr. Stephen W. Kress of the National Audubon Society to learn how to restore puffins to historic nesting islands in the Gulf of Maine. It was started in 1973 when puffins were nesting in only two locations in Maine — Matinicus Rock and Machias Seal Island. The project began with an attempt to restore puffins to Eastern Egg Rock Island in Muscongus Bay, about 6 miles (9.7 km) away from Pemaquid Point. The restoration efforts are based on the fact that young puffins usually return to breed on the same island where they hatched.

Young puffins from Great Island were transplanted to Eastern Egg Rock when they were about 10–14 days old. The young puffins were then nested in artificial sod burrows for about one month. Audubon biologists placed handfuls of vitamin-fortified fish in their burrows each day. As the young puffins reached fledging age, they received identification tags so they could be recognized in the future. After spending their first 2–3 years at sea, it was hoped they would return to establish a new colony at Eastern Egg Rock rather than Great Island.

Between 1973 and 1986, 954 young puffins were transplanted from Great Island to Eastern Egg Rock and 914 of these successfully fledged. Transplanted puffins began returning to Eastern Egg Rock in June 1977. To lure them ashore and encourage the birds to explore their home, wooden puffin decoys were positioned atop large boulders. The number of young puffins has gradually increased. In 1981, four pairs nested beneath boulders at the edge of the island and the colony had increased to 37 pairs in 2001. The total population reached 188 pairs in 2019.

== Project Puffin Visitor Center ==
In 2006 the National Audubon Society opened the Project Puffin Visitor Center in Rockland, Maine. The Center features a live video display of puffins and other seabirds from Seal Island National Wildlife Refuge. Exhibits also include natural history displays, the seabird conservation work done by the Audubon Society and its partners, and a film about Project Puffin. There is also an art gallery and a gift shop.
