= Mount Orient =

Mountain in Massachusetts, United States

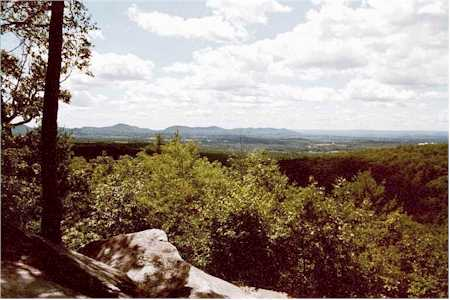
- View from Mount Orient

Highest point
- Elevation: 955 ft (291 m)
- Coordinates: 42°23′36″N 72°27′41″W

Geography
- Location: Hampshire County, Massachusetts, U.S.
- Parent range: Pelham Hills

Geology
- Rock age: 400 million years
- Mountain type(s): Metamorphic rock; dissected plateau

Climbing
- Easiest route: Amethyst Brook trailhead

Mount Orient, 955 feet (291 meters), is a south-facing high point on an upland plateau overlooking the Connecticut River Valley in Pelham, Massachusetts (near Amherst, Massachusetts). Although the summit is wooded, a lower, south-facing ledge of exfoliating metamorphic rock provides views of the Holyoke Range and the east-central Pioneer Valley. Both the Metacomet-Monadnock Trail and the Robert Frost Trail (Massachusetts) traverse Mount Orient. The ledge is a popular hiking destination among college students and residents of nearby Amherst. Easiest access is via the Amethyst Brook Conservation Area parking lot on Pelham Road in east Amherst.

Mount Orient drains into Heatherstone Brook and Amethyst Brook, thence into Fort River, the Connecticut River, and Long Island Sound.

== History ==
In 1909, writer and editor Mabel Loomis Todd, a resident of Amherst, purchased property on Mount Orient hoping to "preserve it from commercial exploitation." In 1960, her only daughter Millicent Todd Bingham gave an 87-acre wooded area, located on Mount Orient to Amherst College to be named the Mabel Loomis Todd Forest.
