= Franklin Island Light =

Lighthouse in Maine, US

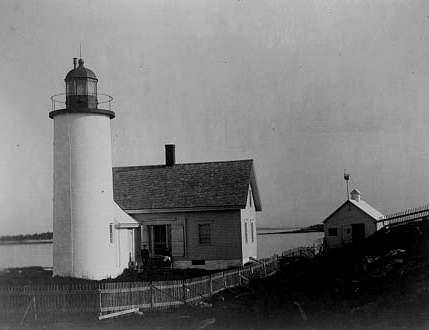
- Location: Muscongus Bay, Maine
- Coordinates: 43°53′31.4″N 69°22′28.6″W

Tower
- Constructed: 1805
- Automated: 1967
- Height: 45 feet (14 m)
- Shape: Cylindrical Brick Tower
- Markings: White

Light
- First lit: 1855 (current structure)
- Focal height: 57 feet (17 m)
- Lens: 4th degree Fresnel lens (original), 9.8 inches (250 mm) (current)
- Range: 8 nautical miles (15 km; 9.2 mi)
- Characteristic: Fl W 6s

Franklin Island Light is a lighthouse on Franklin Island, in Muscongus Bay, Maine, USA. It was first established in 1805. The present structure was built in 1855.
