= Sloop =

Sail boat with a single mast and a fore-and-aft rig

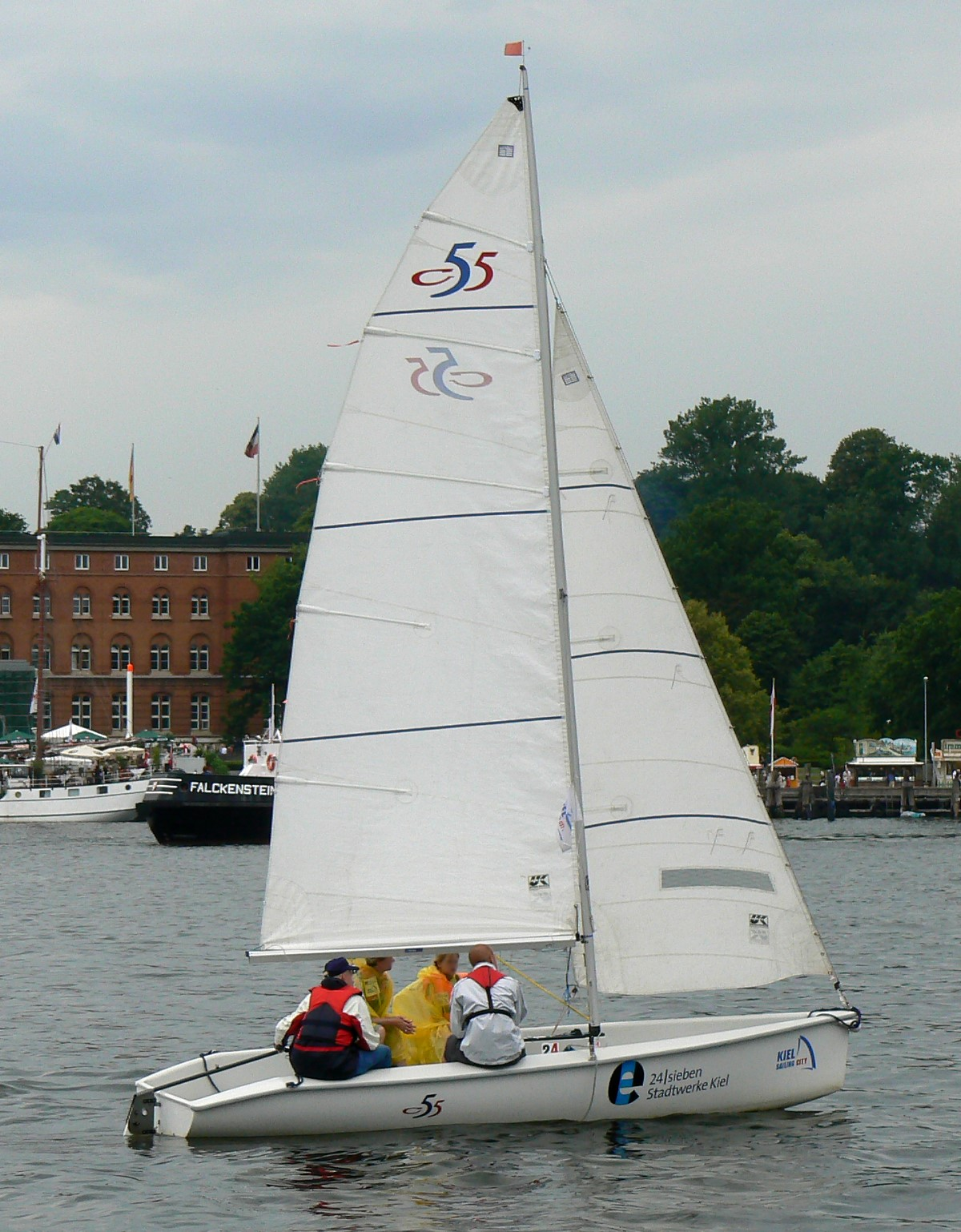
A Bermuda sloop, the most common version of the sloop in modern sailing vessels

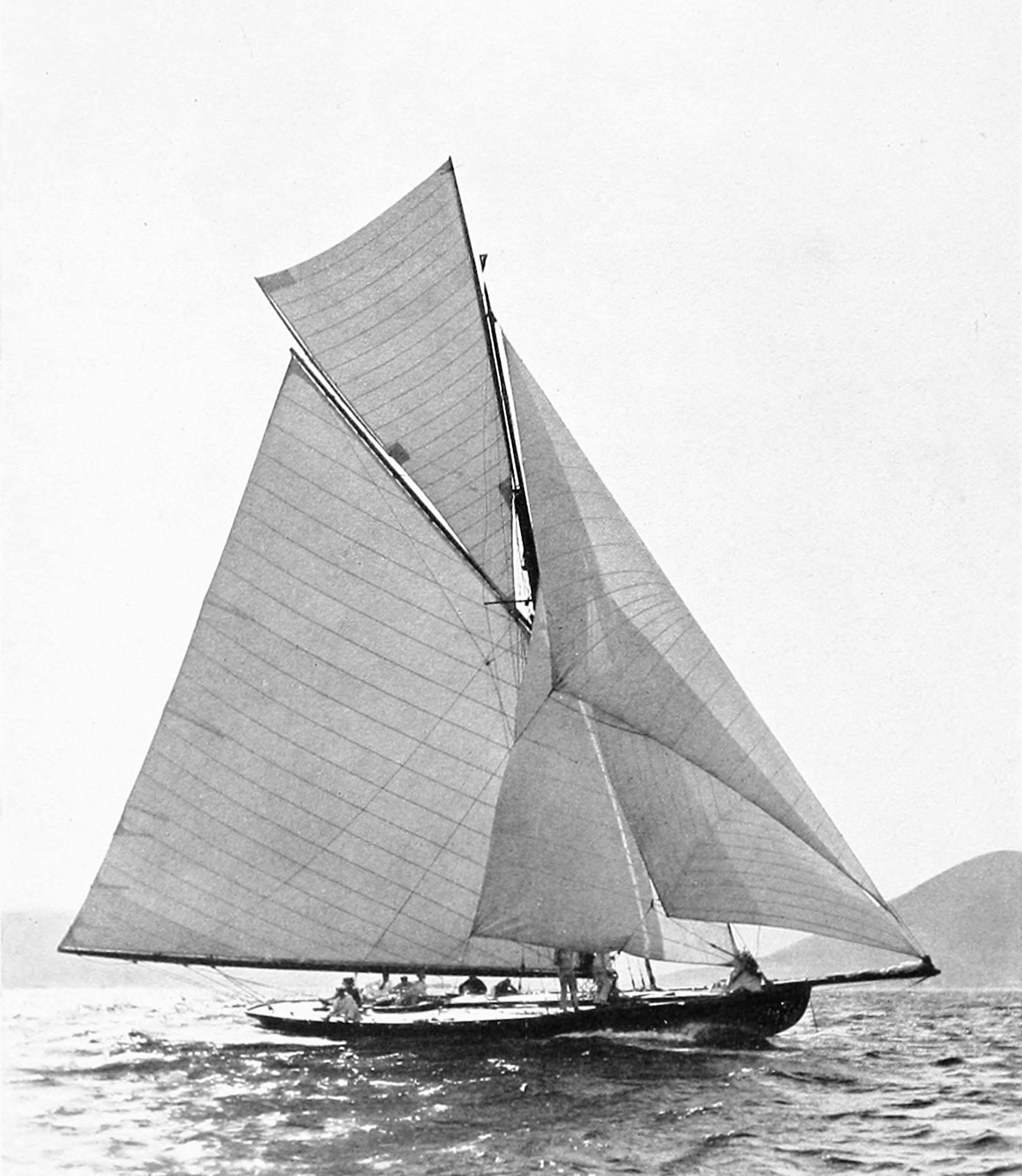
Gaff rigged sloop, 1899

In modern usage, a sloop is a sailboat with a single mast generally having only one headsail in front of the mast and one mainsail abaft (behind) the mast. It is a type of fore-and-aft rig. The mainsail may be of any type, most often Bermuda rig, but also others, such as gaff or gunter.

In naval terminology, "sloop-of-war" refers to the purpose of the craft, rather than to the specific size or sail-plan, and thus a sloop should not be confused with a sloop-of-war. As with many rig definitions, it was some time before the term sloop referred to the type of rig.

Regionally, the definition also takes into account the position of the mast. A forward mast placement and a fixed (as opposed to running) bowsprit, but with two headsails may give categorisation as a sloop. An example is the Friendship Sloop.

== Origins ==
The name originates from the Dutch sloep, which is related to the Old English slūpan, to glide. The original Dutch term applied to an open rowing boat. A sloop is usually regarded as a single-masted rig with a single headsail and a fore-and-aft mainsail. In this form, the sloop is the commonest of all sailing rigs – with the Bermuda sloop being the default rig for leisure craft, being used on types that range from simple cruising dinghies to large racing yachts with high-tech sail fabrics and large powerful winches.If the vessel has two or more headsails, the term cutter is usually applied, though there are regional and historic variations on this. A boat with a forward mast placement and a fixed bowsprit, but more than one headsail, may be called a sloop. The Friendship sloop is an example of this. Particularly with historic craft, categorisation as a cutter may rely on having a running bowsprit. (Note: A running bowsprit is one which is regularly moved from the position in which it is used. This might be done in heavy weather or when entering harbour)

== Variations ==
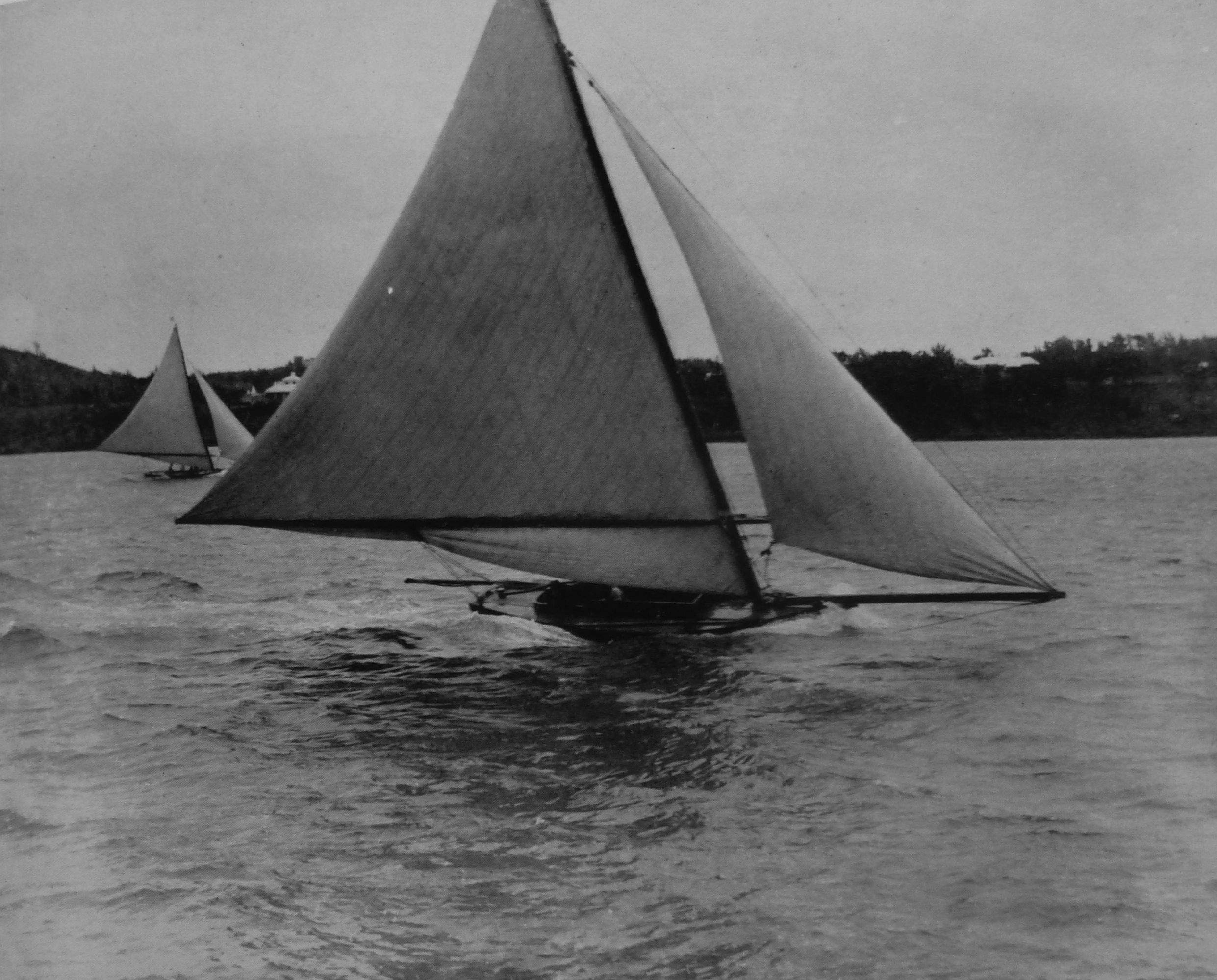
19th century Bermudian sloops racing

Before the Bermuda rig became popular outside of Bermuda in the early 20th century, a (non-Bermudian) sloop might carry one or more square-rigged topsails, hung from a topsail yard and sheeted to a lower yard.

A sloop's headsail may be masthead-rigged or fractional-rigged. On a masthead-rigged sloop, the forestay (on which the headsail is carried) attaches at the top of the mast. On a fractional-rigged sloop, the forestay attaches to the mast at a point below the top. A sloop may use a bowsprit, a spar that projects forward from the bow.

== Gallery ==
Bermuda-rigged sloop. The jib is a headsail. See cutter rig for other examples of headsails.

Gunter-rigged sloop

Gaff-rigged sloop with a headsail and a gaff topsail

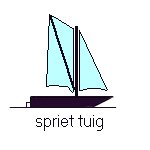
Spritsail sloop

Sloop sail with multiple foresails and topsail

== See also ==
- Bermuda Fitted Dinghy: a scaled-down sloop used for racing in Bermuda
- Bermuda sloop, originally used for a type of sea-going, sloop-rigged vessel. Today used for any Bermuda-rigged sloop
- Chialoup, a historical type of sloop produced in the East Indies
- Mast aft rig, a single mast rig with a mast further back than a sloop or cutter
