= Libby Island Light =

Lighthouse in Maine, United States

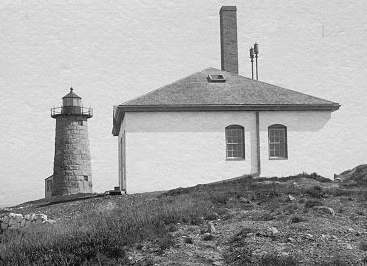
- US Coast Guard photo
- Location: Machias Bay, Maine
- Coordinates: 44°34′5.985″N 67°22′2.555″W

Tower
- Constructed: 1822
- Automated: 1974
- Height: 13 m (43 ft)
- Shape: Conical Granite Tower
- Markings: White
- Heritage: National Register of Historic Places listed place
- Fog signal: HORN: 1 every 15s

Light
- First lit: 1848 (current structure)
- Focal height: 91 feet (28 m)
- Lens: 4th order Fresnel lens (original), VRB-25 (current)
- Range: 18 nautical miles (33 km; 21 mi)
- Characteristic: Fl (2) W 20s
- Libby Island Light Station
- U.S. National Register of Historic Places
- Nearest city: Machiasport, Maine
- Built: 1822
- NRHP reference No.: 76000117
- Added to NRHP: June 18, 1976

Libby Island Light is a lighthouse on Libby Island, marking the mouth of Machias Bay, in Machiasport, Maine. The light station was established in 1817 and is an active aid to navigation; the present granite tower was built in 1823 and improved in 1848. Libby Island Light was listed on the National Register of Historic Places as Libby Island Light Station on June 18, 1976.

== Description and history ==
Libby Island Light is located on South Libby Island, one of two islands (collectively known as the Libby Islands) marking the southernmost approach to Machias Bay on the northeastern coast of Maine. The light station's principal feature is the lighthouse, an unpainted conical granite tower 42 feet (13 m) in height, with its base 16 feet (4.9 m) in diameter and its upper parapet 12 feet 4 inches (3.76 m) in diameter. The tower is located on the southern shore of the island, with a fog signal house to its west. A boat landing is located on the northern shore of the island, and a small helipad is near its center.

The light station was authorized in 1817, and its first tower was a wood-frame structure that was blown down about 1822. The present tower was built in 1823, and a keeper's house added the following year. A fourth-order Fresnel lens was installed in the tower in 1855, and a fog signal and several outbuildings were built the following year. The present fog signal house was built in 1884. Only the light tower, the fog signal house, and the boat launch still survive, all other buildings, including the keepers' houses, were removed. The light was automated in 1974, and converted to solar power in 2000. The Island was added to the Petit Manan National Wildlife Refuge in 1998. The Island is closed to visitors during the bird nesting season, and the tower is maintained as an active aid to navigation by the USCG and is closed to the public.

== See also ==
- National Register of Historic Places listings in Washington County, Maine

== Archives and records ==
- Libby Island, Maine Lighthouse Receipt Book at Baker Library Special Collections, Harvard Business School.
- Lighthouse in My Life. Autobiographical story written by Philmore Wass, whose father was the lighthouse keeper from 1919-1940 about his time growing up on the island.
