= Eastern Egg Rock Island =

Island in St. George, Knox County, Maine

Eastern Egg Rock
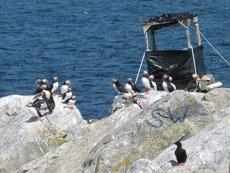
- Puffins on the island
- Interactive map of Eastern Egg Rock

Geography
- Location: Muscongus Bay, Atlantic Ocean
- Coordinates: 43.8606389°N 69.3819911°W
- Area: 0.011 sq mi (0.028 km^{2})
- Highest elevation: 20 ft (6 m)

Administration
- United States

Demographics
- Population: 0

Eastern Egg Rock Island is an island in the Town of St. George in Knox County in the U.S. state of Maine. It is owned by the Maine Department of Inland Fisheries and Wildlife (MDIFW), and it is located off the southern Atlantic Coast of the state. Project Puffin, a restoration effort by the Audubon Society, is implemented on Eastern Egg Rock through a contract with the MDIFW.

== Geography ==
The island is by the mouth of Maine's Muscongus Bay, about 6 miles (9.7 km) off Pemaquid Point. It is treeless and is 7 acres (2.8 ha) in size.

== Project Puffin ==
In 1973, Stephen W. Kress of the Audubon Society started Project Puffin, an effort to restore seabird colonies to the southern Maine area. Atlantic puffins from Newfoundland and terns were reintroduced to the island. Puffins had not been spotted on the island since 1885. Biologists from other countries joined the society to help coax the birds back to Maine's islands and control the population of predators. Techniques used for restoring the birds, such as playing recordings of puffin calls, were mostly effective.

With the help of fish delivered to Eastern Egg Rock, 69 percent of Maine's roseate terns were nesting there by 2004. Now the island is the southern limit of puffin habitat in North America. To protect the birds, the island is closed to visitors for the breeding season, which runs from April through August.

== Gallery ==
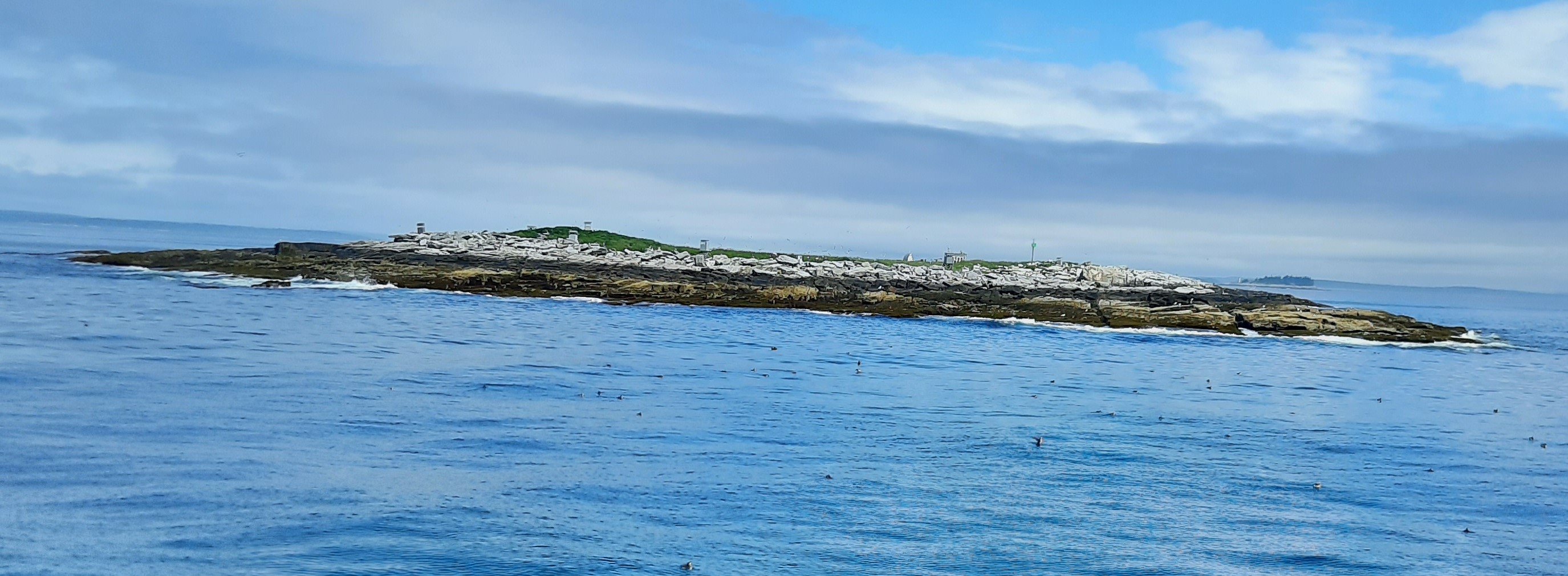
July 2023

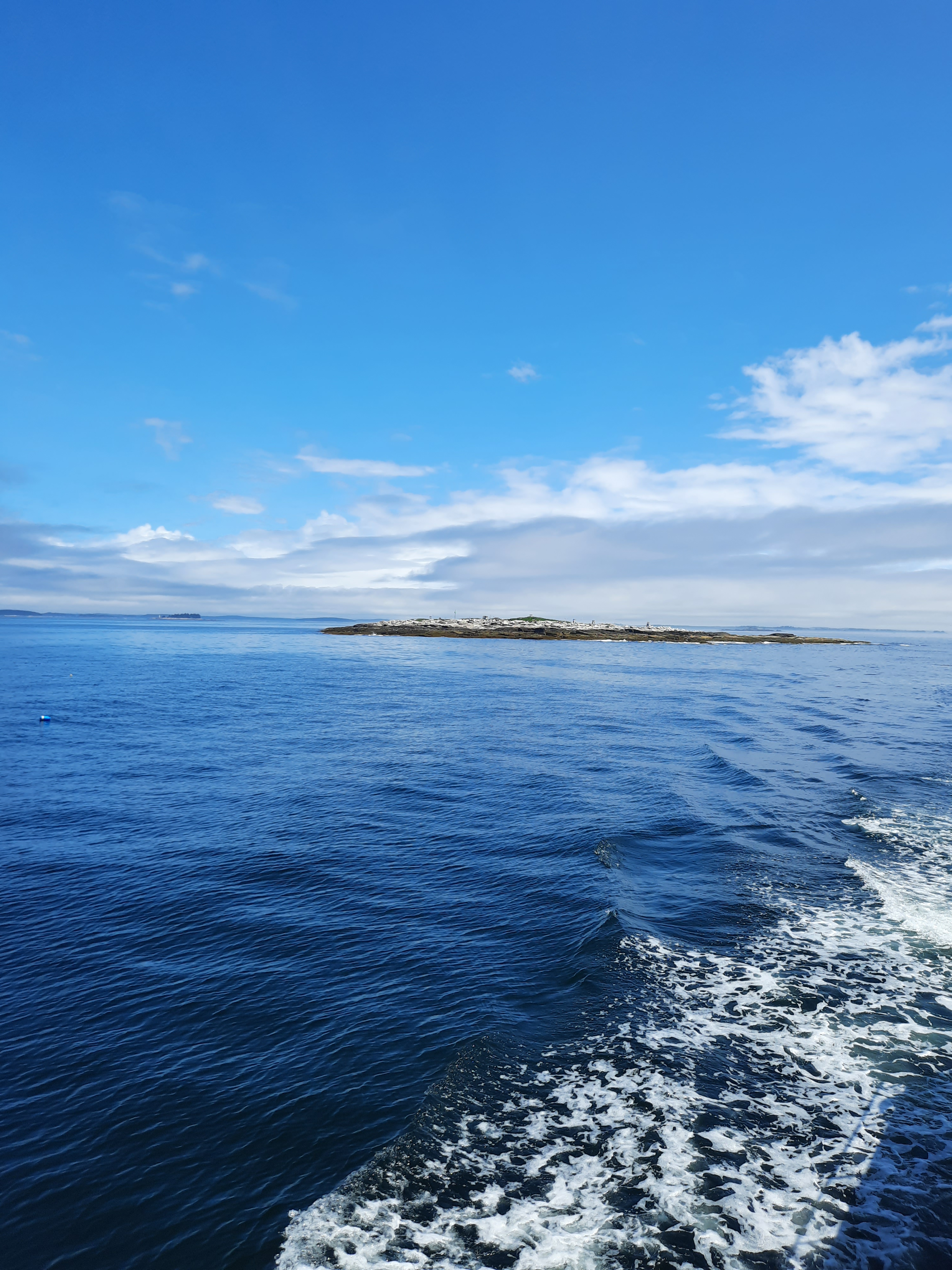
Eastern Egg Rock Island, Maine

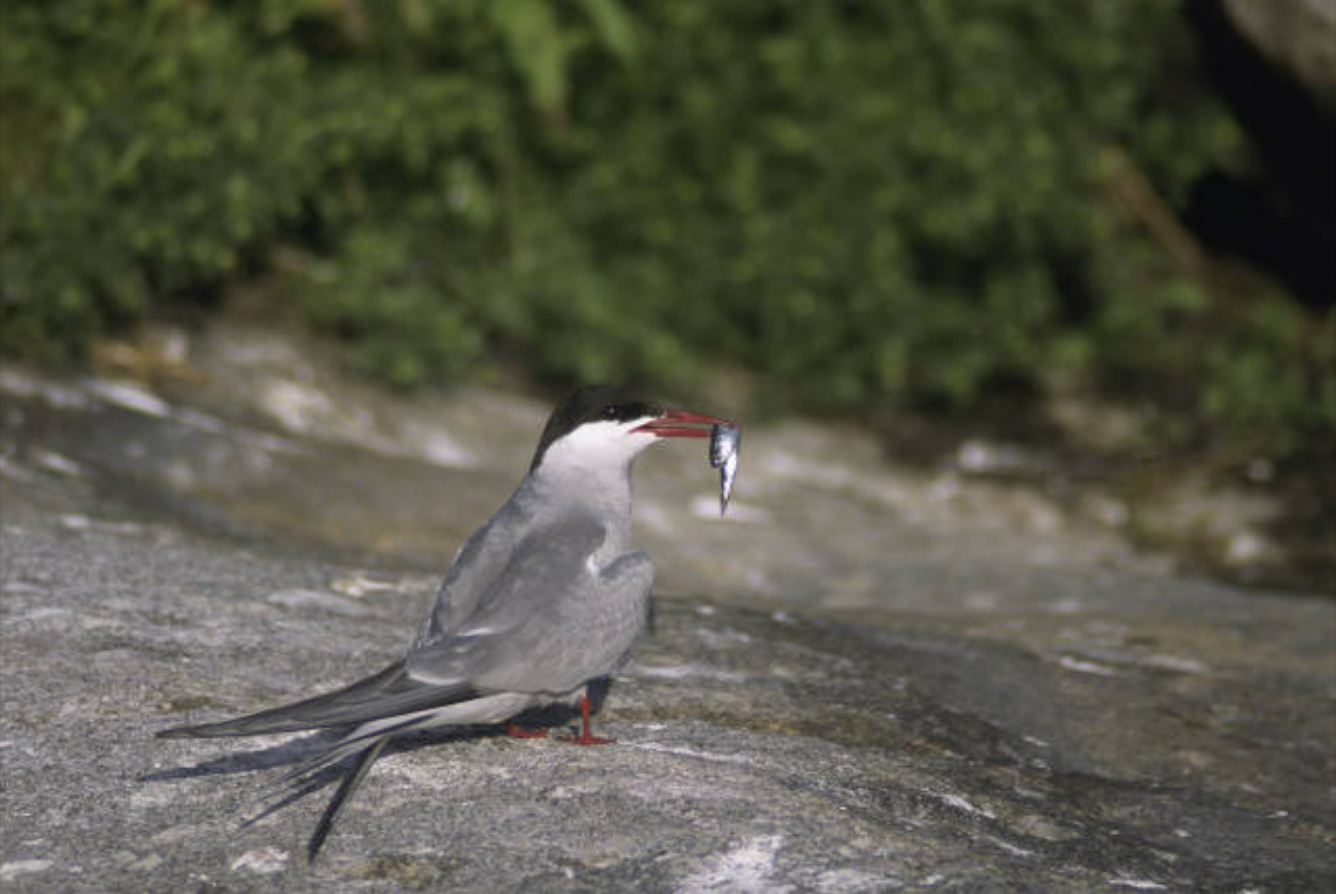
A common tern on Eastern Egg Rock
