= Petit Manan National Wildlife Refuge =

Protected area in Maine, United States

- IUCN category IV (habitat/species management area)
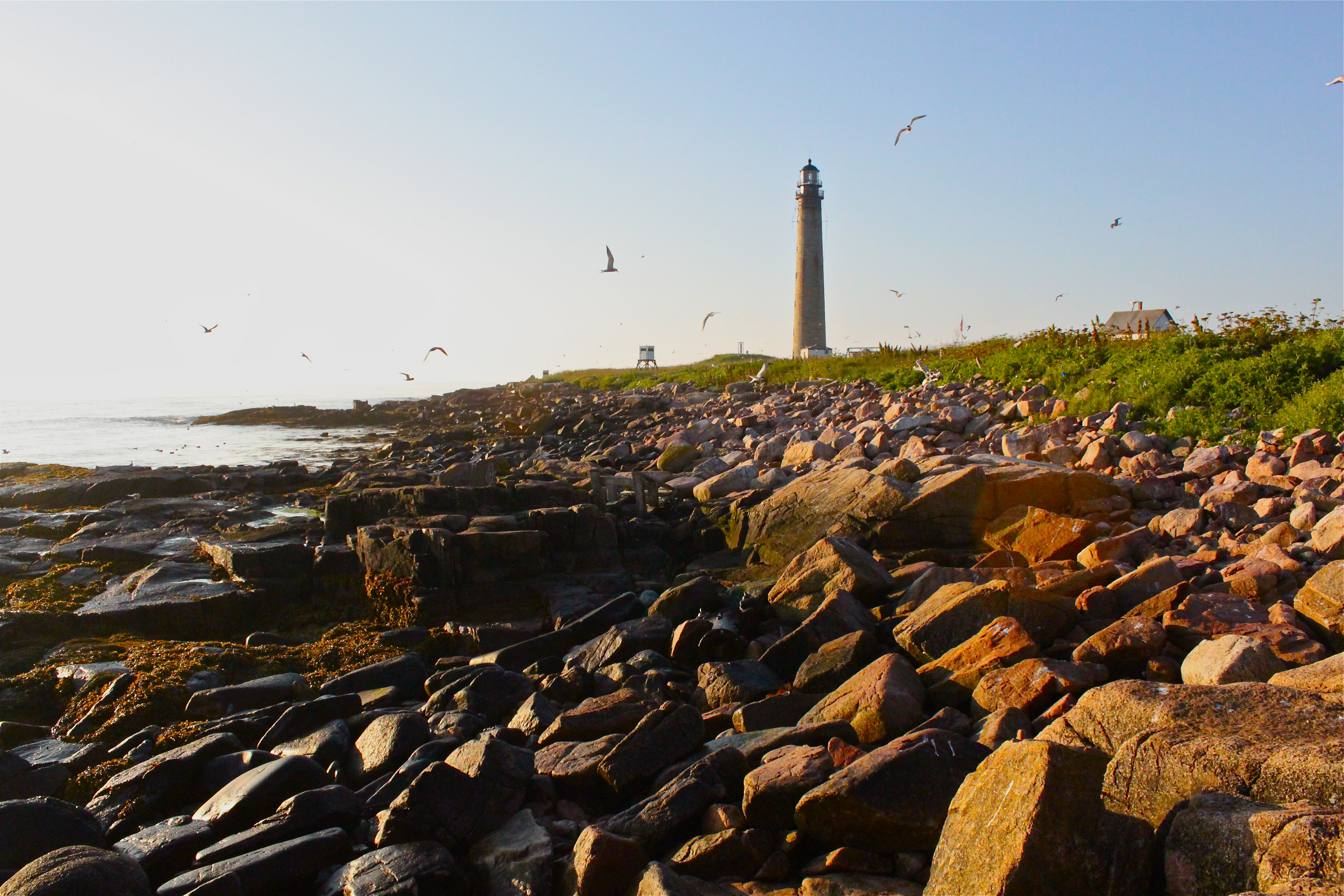
- Petit Manan National Wildlife Refuge

- Location within the United States
- Location: Hancock County, Washington County, Maine, United States
- Nearest city: Steuben, Maine
- Coordinates: 44°26′10″N 67°53′52″W
- Area: 6,367 acres (25.77 km^{2})
- Established: 1974
- Governing body: U.S. Fish and Wildlife Service
- Website: Petit Manan National Wildlife Refuge

Petit Manan National Wildlife Refuge is a National Wildlife Refuge in the state of Maine. It is one of the five refuges that together make up the Maine Coastal Islands National Wildlife Refuge, along with Cross Island, Franklin Island, Seal Island, and Pond Island.

== Geography ==
Petit Manan NWR has a surface area of 6,367 acres (25.77 km^{2}). It is part of the town of Steuben.

The refuge has four mainland divisions. The 2,195-acre (8.88 km^{2}) Petit Manan Point Division. The Gouldsboro Bay Division protects 623 acres (2.52 km^{2}). The 1,028-acre (4.16 km^{2}) Sawyer's Marsh Division. The 431-acre (1.74 km^{2}) Corea Heath Division.

Petit Manan NWR includes 2,078 acres (8.41 km^{2}) acres on 41 islands, stretching the entire coastline of Maine.
