= Walter V. Bingham =

American psychologist

Walter Van Dyke Bingham (1880–1952) was an applied and industrial psychologist who made significant contributions to intelligence testing. A pioneer in applied psychology, Bingham got his start in experimental psychology, receiving his Ph.D. at the University of Chicago under James R. Angell. Bingham went from Dartmouth in 1915 to organize the Division of Applied Psychology at the Carnegie Institute of Technology. When war came to the United States, Bingham was recruited by Robert Yerkes as a member of a small group that developed the Army Alpha and Beta tests. During World War I Bingham served as executive secretary of the committee on classification of personnel in the U.S. Army, and later in the war served as lieutenant colonel in the Personnel Branch of the Army General Staff. From 1940 to 1947 Bingham was chief psychologist of the Adjutant General's Office of the War Department, serving as consultant or advisor to the Surgeon General, the Army General Staff, and the Secretary of Defense. Walter Bingham's contribution on the army classification methods paved the development of the field of industrial psychology. Bingham carried out editorial responsibilities for several journals and was the author of over 200 articles and books. His "Aptitude and Aptitude Testing" (1937/1942) is a classic in the field.

== Education and early career ==
Walter Van Dyke Bingham was born in Swan Lake City, Iowa to Lemuel and Martha Bingham. Deemed an exceptional student early on, Bingham skipped the 3rd and 4th grades, graduating high school at the age of 16. He was an industrious youth, selling enough popcorn at the train station to pay his way to Chicago's 1893 World's Fair. Upon graduating from high school, Walter took a job as a rodman on the Burlington, Cedar Rapids and Northern Railway. His first job outside of the home was a printer's devil, inking forms for the weekly edition of the Emmet County Republican. Bingham was accepted to Beloit College in Wisconsin, graduating with honors in 1901 at the age of twenty. For a time, he taught mathematics and physics at Beloit Academy and Elgin High School. Bingham went on to study at Harvard University, receiving a master's degree in 1907. He continued his scholarship at both Harvard, working in Hugo Münsterberg’s lab under the direction of Edwin B. Holt, and The University of Chicago under the direction of James Angell, receiving two doctoral degrees in 1908. His dissertation, entitled, “Studies in Melody and Movement” was based on vast experimentation examining the psychophysiological effects of melody on humans. Under Angell, psychology became firmly established as an empirical subject using experimental methods. He developed a functionalist theory of psychological processes and mind-body relationships, specifically, the status accorded to the study of reflexive consciousness as well as physiological status. Similarly, Edwin B. Holt's Industrial/Organizational approach was also heavily based in experimentation. He looked at problems with monotony, attention and fatigue, physical and social influences on the working power, the effects of advertising, and the future development of economic psychology. Each of the two men mentoring Bingham had profound influence on Bingham's career and research trajectory. After receiving his doctoral degree, Bingham took a postdoctoral position as a teacher's assistant to Edward Thorndike at Teacher's College of Columbia University. In 1915, after serving as an assistant professor at Dartmouth College, he was invited to Carnegie Institute of Technology to create a unit that would use psychology to help students with career choices. While at Carnegie he embarked on his pioneering venture of using psychology as a tool to help clarify the problems of some of the large industries in the Pittsburgh area. At the same time, with the founding of a division of applied psychology, he endeavored to provide instruction for students planning careers in industrial management and other fields where success depended in some measure on the ability to understand and influence people. He hoped the instruction would enable such students to have a better understanding of human behavior. This work antedated such well-known historical developments in applied psychology as the Committee on Classification of Personnel in the army in 1917–1918 and the formation in 1919–1923 of the Scott Company, the first personnel consulting firm of applied psychologists. Bingham created the Bureau of mental tests and in 1916, an umbrella organization, the Division of Applied Psychology which developed into the first organized academic/industry cooperative personnel research program.

== World Wars and Intelligence Testing ==
In 1917, immediately after the United States entered the First World War, a small team of psychologists—Bingham among them—headed by Robert M. Yerkes was deployed to design group intelligence tests that could identify recruits with low intelligence and allow the Army to recognize men who were particularly well-suited for special assignments and officers’ training schools. It was believed that he had a unique gift in identifying talented individuals. The final forms of the Army Alpha and Beta tests were published in January 1919, and by the end of the war they had been administered to approximately two million men. Bingham spent the years after the First World War writing books and articles emphasizing the civilian applications of the testing procedures he helped develop for the Army. He believed that aptitude tests and intelligence subtest scores could be used to help businesses increase the efficiency of their workforce. Further, it would help teachers and counselors direct their students and clients to careers that would make them happy. Bingham also noted that aptitude testing would be useful for identifying the types of jobs at which the developmentally disabled could be successful.

The onslaught of World War II brought a new position as Chief psychologist in the Army Adjutant General's office to Bingham. In 1940, he was appointed Chairman of the Army National Research Council on Classification of Military Personnel. His research team created a series of aptitude tests that served several purposes. Bingham believed that these aptitude tests would help the war effort through increasing American military might. He asserted that the human engineering made possible by the administration of aptitude tests would increase the efficiency and effectiveness of military training programs in the same way that mechanical engineering maximizes the effectiveness of tanks, guns, and airplanes. By 1941, standardized test scores had been recorded for more than a million military men. His planning and consulting services to the army in World War II are acknowledged by the inscription, “architect of the classification system of the army, 1940–1947,” which appears on his headstone in Arlington National Cemetery.

== Professional life ==
Throughout his tenure with the American military, Bingham continued to hold a variety of professional roles. He remained Director of the Personnel Research Federation at Carnegie and assisted in editing the Personnel Journal which he helped found at Carnegie in 1922. He served as president of the Psychological Corporation from 1926 to 1928 and was appointed professorial lecturer in psychology at Stevens Institute of Technology in 1930. Applied psychology grew in importance during and immediately following World War I, and Bingham came to hold many responsible positions. As aforementioned, he served as executive secretary of the Committee on Classification of Personnel in the army in 1917–1918; he held the rank of lieutenant colonel in the personnel branch of the U.S. Army General Staff in 1918–1919; and he was the first chairman of the division of anthropology and psychology of the National Research Council in 1919–1920. In 1927 he served as the American member of the board of the International Congress of Techno-psychology. In 1942 Bingham was appointed director of the Personnel Research Foundation Inc., where for many years he carried on independent research and served as a consultant in industrial psychology. Additionally, Bingham served as president of the American Association of Applied Psychology (1937) and past secretary of the American Psychological Association (1942).

As applied and industrial psychology grew in prominence, Bingham became focused on the measurement of the abilities of able and brilliant students and the early identification of the gifted. This aspect of his work was honored after his death by the American Psychological Association with the establishment of an annual lectureship in his name. The lectures have two purposes: to bring to the attention of psychologists and others the great value of accurate identification of exceptionally promising young people; and to honor psychologists and institutions working in this field.

Bingham was the author of over two hundred articles and books. He wrote on a wide variety of topics ranging from articles on tonal fusion, vocal functions, and studies in melody to such topics as the search for skill and talent in the army, skill identification and development in academia and industry, and reliability, validity, and dependability of psychological assessment tools. Two of his books, How to Interview (Bingham & Moore 1931) and Aptitudes and Aptitude Testing (1937), are classics in the field of personnel psychology and guidance. Bingham's works have been widely used and his research established training in applied psychology as a respectable and common part of the curriculum at institutions of higher learning. Due in large part to Bingham, the testing movement flourished. Research in industrial psychology, guidance and counseling, and personnel psychology has proceeded to develop in many of the problem areas along the lines he suggested. Additionally, his hope that more attention would be paid to students of high ability has certainly been realized in the greatly increased research and educational activity in this area. Bingham's contribution to applied psychology transformed psychology from the academic (science) to the real world (practice). Throughout the many positions he held during his lifetime, he made a point to show those he affected that psychology could be used to tap into the ability of individuals while using this as a method to match the right people to the right career roles.

Today, personnel psychology aids in the recruitment, selection, placement, psychometrics, performance appraisal, training and development and legal issues (Equal Employment Opportunity) Title VII, CRA 1991. This methodology encompasses measuring and predicting individual differences in behavior and job performance in the workplace. Research in this field is used to increase workplace productivity, select employees best suited for particular jobs, and product testing. Since the founding of the Carnegie program in 1915, Bingham's research, vision, and work have determined in large measure the directions that applied and industrial psychology have taken today.

== Applied and Industrial Psychology ==
The field of applied psychology is the use of psychological methods and findings of scientific psychology to solve practical problems of human and animal behavior and experience. Some of the areas of applied psychology include: clinical psychology, counseling psychology, evolutionary psychology, industrial and organizational psychology, legal psychology, neuropsychology, occupational health psychology, human factors, forensic psychology, engineering psychology, school psychology, sports psychology, traffic psychology, community psychology, and medical psychology.

Industrial and organizational psychology (I/O) specializes in the psychology of the workforce, customer, and consumer, including issues such as the psychology of recruitment, selecting employees from an applicant pool, training, performance appraisal, job satisfaction, work motivation, work behavior, stress at work, and management. Military psychology includes research into the classification, training, and performance of soldiers and is an additional branch of I/O psychology.

== Personal life ==
In 1920, Walter Bingham married Millicent Todd. Millicent Todd Bingham was the first woman to receive a doctorate in geology and geography from Harvard and later became a leading expert on Emily Dickinson. She had distinguished careers in both geography and literature. Throughout the marriage, Millicent took an active interest in Bingham's work, writing Beyond Psychology after his death in 1953, in memory of her husband.

== Publications ==
- 1907 The Role of the Tympanic Mechanism in Audition. Psychological Review 14:229–243.
- 1910a Studies in Melody. Psychological Monographs 12, no. 3.
- 1910b The Use of Experiment in Teaching Educational Psychology: Report of the Meeting of New York Teachers of Educational Psychology, Held at Ithaca, N.Y., April 8–9, 1910. Journal of Educational Psychology 1: 287–292.
- 1911 A Useful Demonstration of Tonal Fusion. Psychological Bulletin 8: 57.
- 1914 Five Years of Progress in Comparative Musical Science. Psychological Bulletin 11:421–433.
- 1916 Bingham, Walter; Scott, W. D.; and Whipple, G. M. Scientific Selection of Salesmen: A Report on the Demonstration of Scientific Methods in the Testing of Applicants. Salesmanship 4:106–108.
- 1917 Mentality Testing of College Students. Journal of Applied Psychology 1:38–45.
- 1919 Army Personnel Work: With Some Implications for Education and Industry. Journal of Applied Psychology 3:1–12.
- 1923 On the Possibility of an Applied Psychology. Psychological Review 30:289–305.
- 1924 Bingham, Walter; and Davis, W. T. Intelligence Test Scores and Business Success. Journal of Applied Psychology 8:1–22.
- 1926a Measures of Occupational Success. Harvard Business Review 5:1–10.
- 1926b Personality and Dominant Interest: Vocational Tendencies of Introverts. Psychological Bulletin 23:153–154.
- 1926 Bingham, Walter; and Freyd, Max. Procedures in Employment Psychology: A Manual for Developing Scientific Methods of Vocational Selection. Chicago and New York: Shaw.
- 1927 Bingham, Walter; and Slocombe, C. S. Men Who Have Accidents: Individual Differences Among Motormen and Bus Operators. Personnel Journal 6:251–257.
- 1929 The Personal Interview Studied by Means of Analysis and Experiment. Social Forces 7:530–533.
- 1931 Management's Concern With Research in Industrial Psychology. Harvard Business Review 10:40–53.
- 1941 Bingham, Walter; and Moore, Bruce V. How to Interview. 3d ed., rev. New York: Harper.
- 1934 Abilities and Opportunities: Some Meanings of Trends in Occupational Distribution. Occupations 12:6–17.
- 1935 MacQuarrie Test for Mechanical Ability. Occupations 14:202–205.
- 1937 Aptitudes and Aptitude Testing. New York: Harper.
- 1938a Halo: Its Prevalence and Nature in Estimates of Objective Traits and in Inferential Trait-judgments. Psychological Bulletin 35:641–642.
- 1938b Testing in Vocational Guidance. Education 58:539–544.
- 1939 A National Perspective on Testing and Guidance. Educational Record 20 (Supplement):137–150.
- 1941 Psychological Services in the United States Army. Journal of Consulting Psychology 5:221–224.
- 1944 Personnel Classification Testing in the Army. Science New Series 100:275–280.
- 1946 Inequalities in Adult Capacity: From Military Data. Science New Series 104:147–152.
- 1947 Military Psychology in War and Peace. Science New Series 106:155–160.
- 1948 Psychologists in Industry. American Psychologist 3:321–323.
