= Medomak River =

- Medomak River in Waldoboro, Maine

Location
- Country: United States

Physical characteristics
- Source
  - location: Maine
  - elevation: 600 feet (180 m)
- Mouth
  - location: Muscongus Bay
  - coordinates: 44°00′32″N 69°23′20″W
  - elevation: sea level
- Length: 40 mi (64 km)

Basin features
- Tributaries
  - left: Back River, Goose River

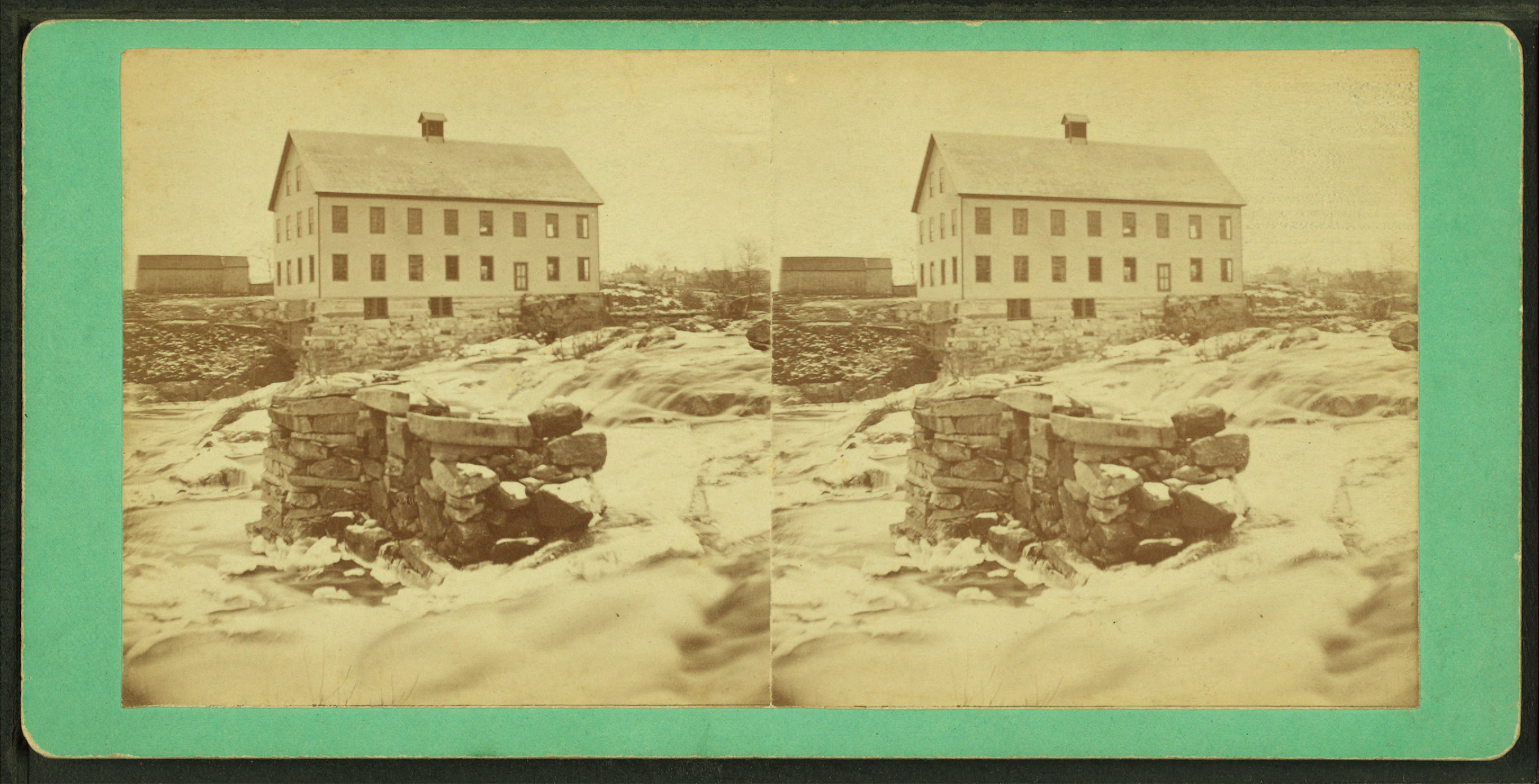
Flour mill at the upper falls in Waldoboro, by Asa H. Lane. The Medomak River provided water power for many mills in the 18th and 19th centuries.

The Medomak River, historically known as the Muscongus River, is a 40-mile-long (64 km) river in Maine. From its source (44°21′48″N 69°21′09″W) in Liberty, the river winds 32 miles (51 km) south to the head of its tidal river estuary in Waldoboro, then about 8 miles (13 km) south to Bremen. The river flows through Hockomock Channel into the head of Muscongus Bay. Medomak is Abenaki for "place (river) of many alewives".

== Human history ==
The Medomak River was the boundary between the Waldo Patent and Pemaquid Patent but the early European settlers recruited in Germany by Samuel Waldo were unaware and settled both sides of the river. Later the settlers on the west bank of the river had to purchase the land they had settled on from the legal owners. The settlers arrived by ship and traveled by foot or boat until roads began to be built in the 1780s. Two ferries crossed the river in Waldoboro, (John) Light's ferry roughly east of the German Church and Waterman's ferry from Dutch Neck to Sampson Cove. The first bridge (main street) was built In the 19th century Waldoboro became a significant shipbuilding center and customs port of entry. Many dams were built in the 18th and 19th centuries to power water mills such as sawmills and grist mills. These dams prevented fish migrations such as alewives with an estimated harvest of 41,512 in 1896 to being "practically extinct" by 1956.

== Fresh water section ==
The fresh water section of the Medomak River drains the Medomak River Watershed which is about 74 square miles with about 1077 acres of lake area. Seven great ponds include Crystal, Washington, Johnson, Iron, Medomak, Little Medomak and Kalers Ponds. Pettingill Brook, Little Medomak Brook, Kalers Pond Outlet, and Hope Brook feed the Medomak. Fishes include brook trout (squaretail), white sucker, brown trout, minnows, smalImouth bass, lake chub, white perch, common shiner, yellow perch, golden shiner, chain pickerel, blackchin shiner, hornpout (bullhead), redbelly dace, smelt, blacknose dace, alewife, ninespine stickleback, eel, and pumpkinseed sunfish.

== Salt water section ==
This river is a significant clam fishery. Some of the migratory fishes in the river include alewives, blueback herring (together called river herring), American eels (the juveniles called elvers or glass eels), rainbow smelt and striped bass. Two other notable species are the horseshoe crab and quahog clam.

== See also ==
- List of rivers of Maine
