= Friendship Sloop =

Gaff-rigged sailboat

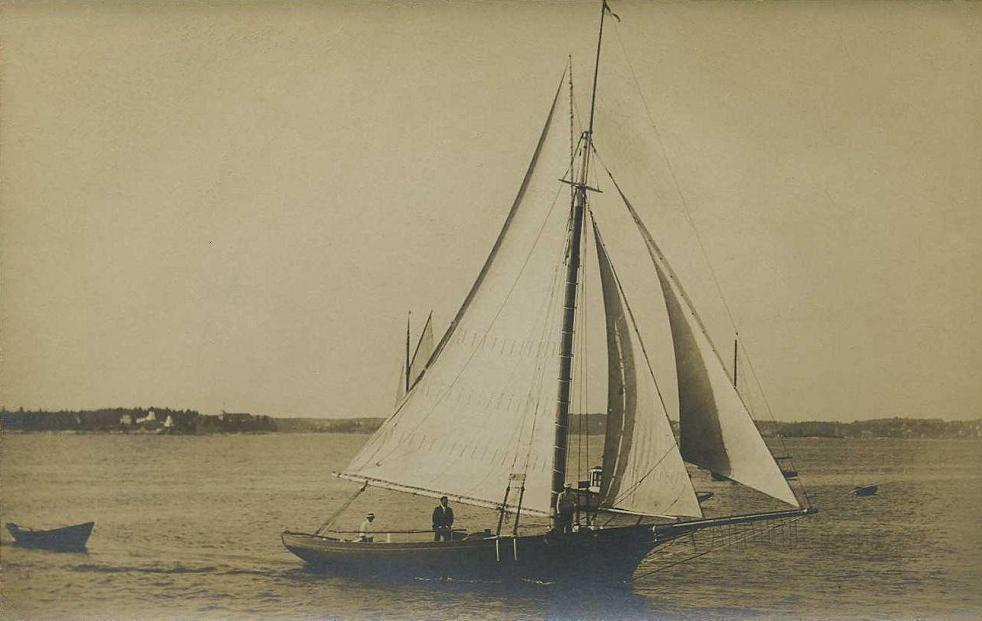
Friendship Sloop in c. 1920

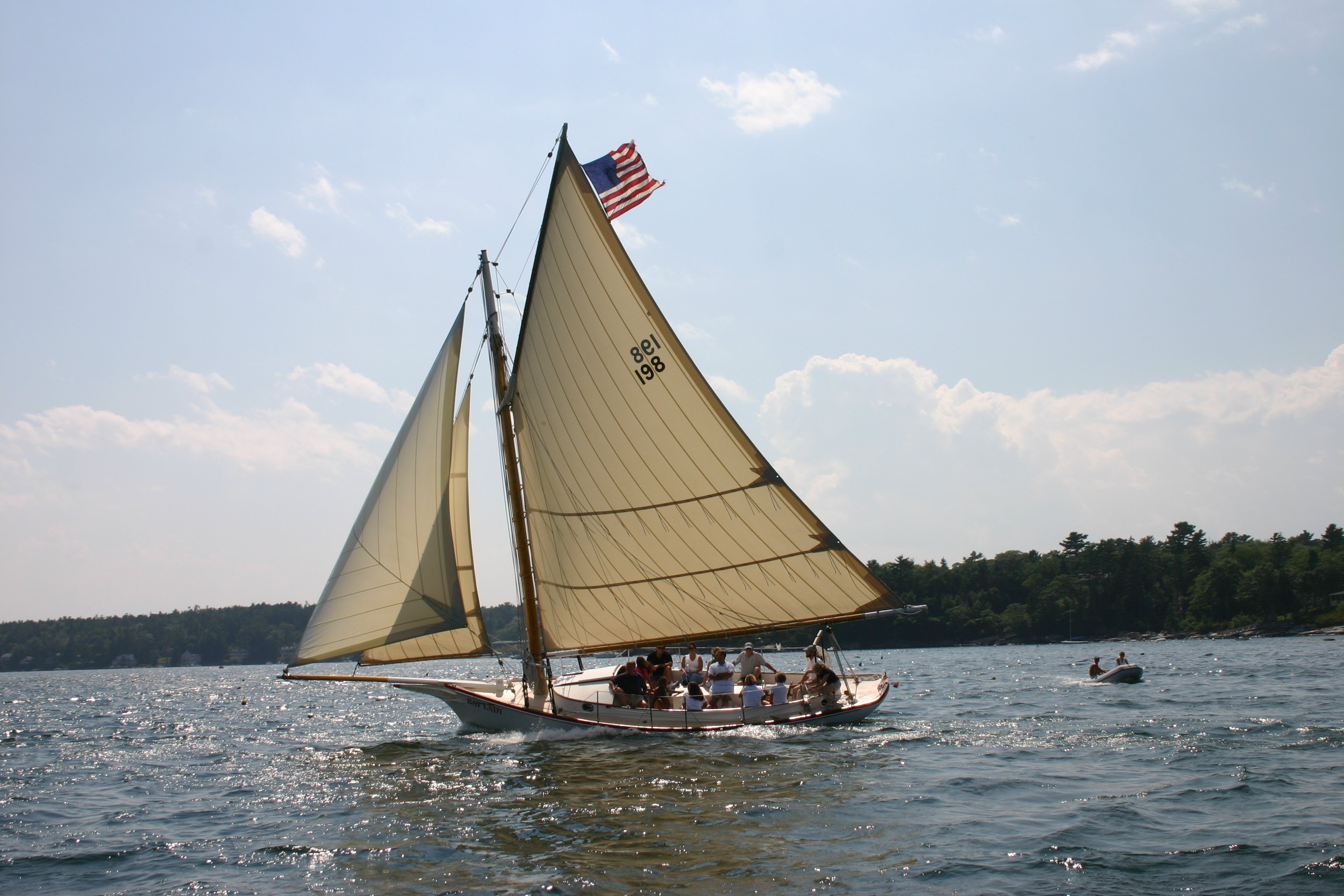
Fiberglass Friendship Sloop Bay Lady (launched in 1979)

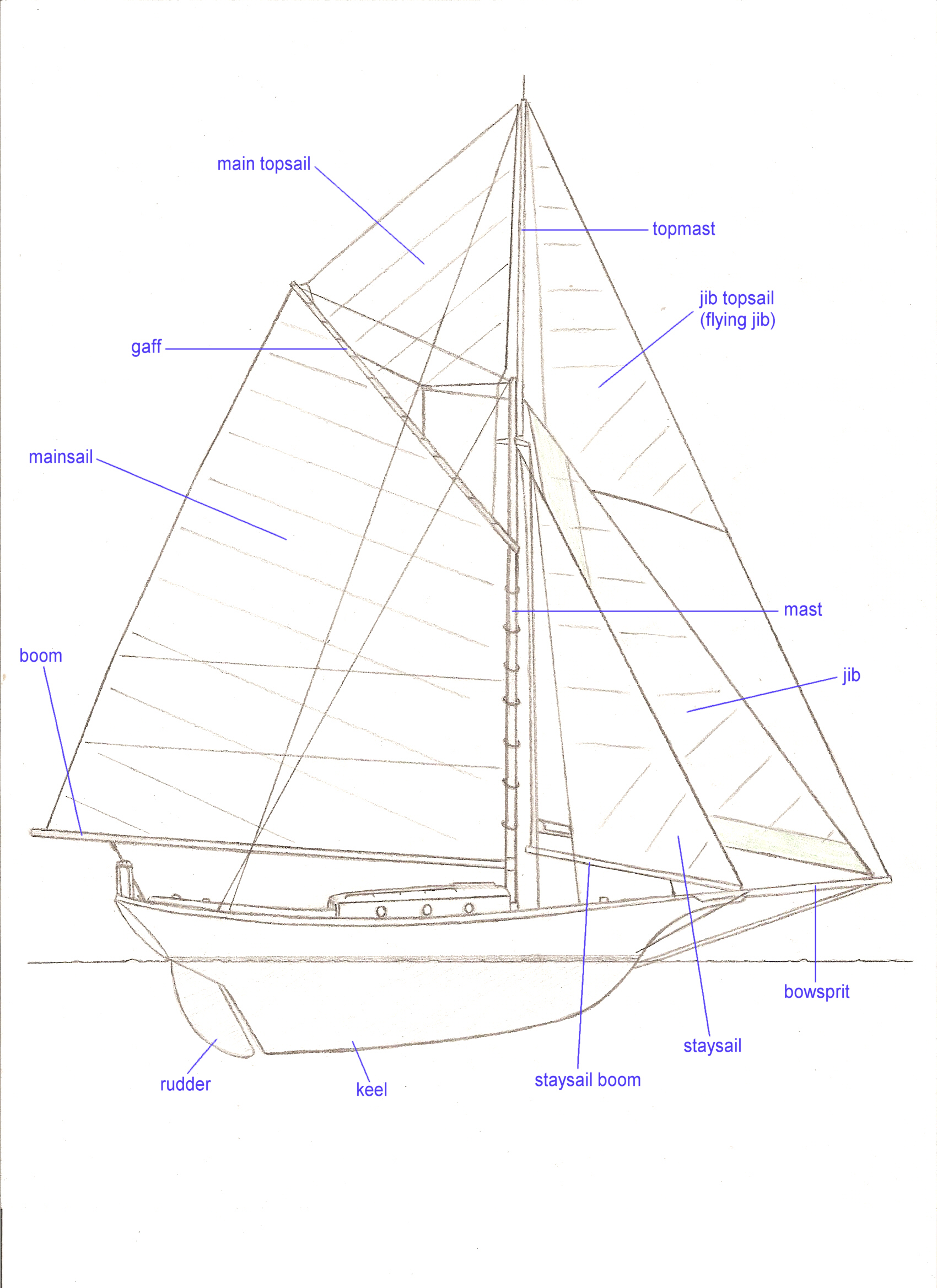
Diagram of a Friendship Sloop

The Friendship sloop, also known as a Muscongus Bay sloop or lobster sloop, is a gaff-rigged working boat design that originated in Friendship, Maine around 1880 and has survived as a traditional-style sailboat.

== History ==
Fishermen in Friendship and neighboring Bremen collectively originated the boat's design, influenced in part, by the fishing sailboats of Gloucester, Massachusetts. The boat was used primarily for lobstering or local commerce. Boat builder Wilbur A. Morse was principle among five major Muscongus Bay builders that produced the design from the 1880s to the 1910s. From then until 1960 four major builders continued the tradition, three from the region.

One person could manage its single-masted rig and haul traps unassisted, yet the boat could carry sizable loads. With an open cockpit aft, and a small forward cabin outfitted with bunks and a stove, it made fishing during cold weather much less arduous than in an open boat. By 1900 these sloops ranged from 30–40 feet (9.1–12.2 m) long along the deck and were used for bringing fish or lobsters from offshore vessels to processing plants.

In the 1900s the boats received auxiliary motors until 1920, when power boats supplanted them for commercial use. Thereafter, the fleet became available to those who adapted boats to become affordable sailing yachts.

Modern reproductions, both wooden and fiberglass, continue to be built. although the cockpits and interiors of such pleasure craft tend to be substantially different from the original workboats. The overall design and historical example of the type are preserved through the Friendship Sloop Society. The society holds annual races in Maine.

== Design and classification ==
Friendship sloops typically have a clipper bow, a full keel, an elliptical stern and a bowsprit. The mast height is approximately equal to the length of the deck and stepped forward, such that the head sails are attached to the bowsprit. The hull typically has a full length keel, traditionally ballasted with rocks or more recently with steel. They are gaff-rigged, with a mainsail, a staysail and normally a jib. They may additionally have a topmast with a main topsail and jib topsail (flying jib). They have ranged from 19–50 feet (5.8–15.2 m) feet along the deck; plans are available for such vessels up to 40 feet (12.2 m) along the deck.

The Friendship Sloop Society initially classified the boats, as follows:

- Class A – Original vessels
- Class B – Replicas
- Class C – Near replicas
- Class D – Near replicas other than wood

In 1986, it combined classes B through D. The boats recognized as "one of a kind" outnumber those regarded as "semi-production". Races are held in two divisions for boats 25 feet (7.6 m) or shorter on the deck (Division I) and those longer than that (Division II).
