= Goose River (Medomak River tributary) =

- Location of the mouth of the Goose River in Maine

Location
- Country: United States
- State: Maine
- Counties: Lincoln, Knox

Physical characteristics
- Source
  - location: Knox County
  - coordinates: 44°04′54″N 69°17′46″W
- Mouth: Medomak River
  - location: Lincoln County
  - coordinates: 44°00′47″N 69°21′19″W
  - elevation: 0 m

The Goose River is a 10.6-mile-long (17.1 km) tributary of the Medomak River in the U.S. state of Maine.

== See also ==
- List of rivers of Maine
