= Friendship, Maine =

Town in Maine, United States

- Town
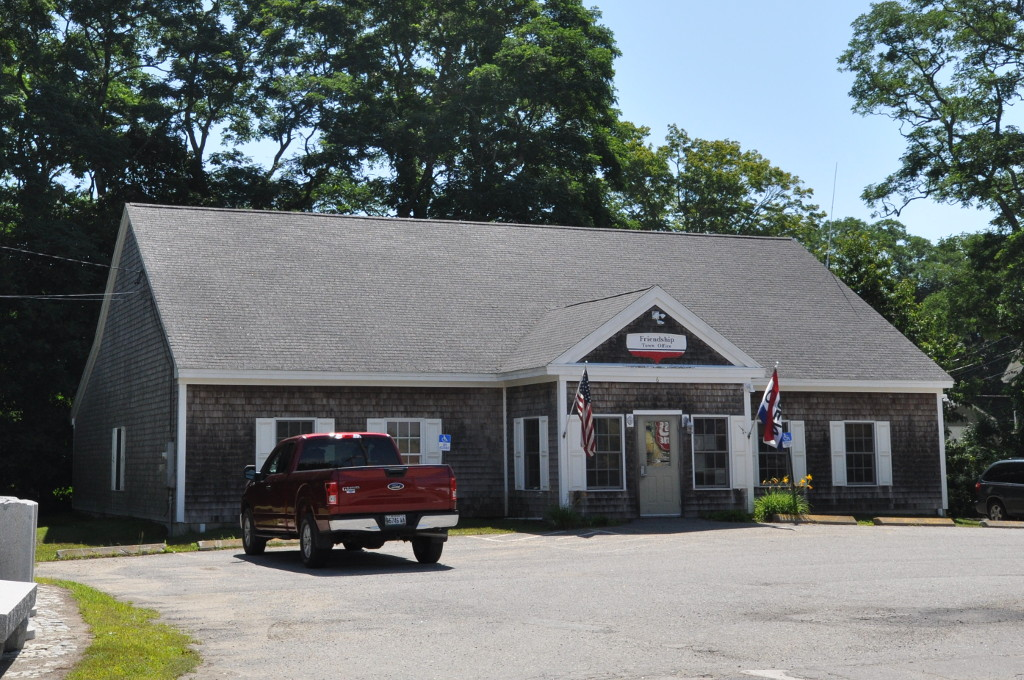
- Town offices, Friendship, Maine

- Coordinates: 43°57′35″N 69°21′30″W
- Country: United States
- State: Maine
- County: Knox
- Incorporated: 1807
- Villages: Friendship; East Friendship; Lawry

Area
  - Total: 31.37 sq mi (81.25 km^{2})
  - Land: 14.10 sq mi (36.52 km^{2})
  - Water: 17.27 sq mi (44.73 km^{2})
- Elevation: 20 ft (6.1 m)

Population (2025)
  - Total: 1,131
  - Density: 80/sq mi (31/km^{2})
- Time zone: UTC-5 (Eastern (EST))
  - Summer (DST): UTC-4 (EDT)
- ZIP code: 04547
- Area code: 207
- FIPS code: 23-26805
- GNIS feature ID: 582484
- Website: friendship.maine.gov

Friendship (formerly known as Meduncook) is a town in Knox County, Maine, United States. The town was incorporated in 1762 as "Meduncook". It is 31 miles (50 km) southeast of Augusta and had a population of 1,142 in 2020.

== History ==
Part of the Waldo Patent, what is now Friendship was first settled in 1743. A garrison was built on what is now Garrison Island, which is connected to the mainland at low tide. By 1754, 22 families lived in Meduncook, most taking shelter within the garrison when the French and Indian War broke out.

=== Raid on Meduncook (1758) ===
During the French and Indian War, the community was raided twice. The first attack was by the Abenaki just after sunrise on May 22, 1758. They killed and scalped Joshua and Hannah Bradford and their infant son, Winslow. An original settler from Kingston, Massachusetts, and a great-grandson of Governor William Bradford, Joshua had remained in his house, believing it close enough to the garrison that his family could flee there when necessary, but, while pounding corn, the Bradfords missed hearing the garrison's alarm gun. Five of their children managed to escape their pursuers into the fort, but two of their sons, Cornelius (21) and Joshua (12), were captured and carried to Canada.

After trying to lay siege to Thomaston, Maine, in September 1758, a party of Native Americans and Acadians under the command of the French officer Charles Deschamps de Boishébert et de Raffetot raided the village. Eight British were captured or killed.

On February 25, 1807, Meduncook Plantation was incorporated as Friendship. By 1859, when the population was 691, the village had two shipbuilders, two gristmills, one shingle mill and three sawmills. By 1880, when the population was 938, other manufactures included sails, carriages, boots and shoes. Boatbuilding remained the dominant industry in town, which became famous for producing the Friendship Sloop, a gaff-rigged sailboat designed for lobstering and fishing. Each summer the town hosts the Friendship Sloop Races.

The author John Cheever wrote his 1957 novel The Wapshot Chronicle while vacationing in Friendship.

== Attractions ==
The Friendship Museum was established in 1964. Before becoming a museum, it was the Friendship Grammar School from 1851 to 1923. The museum is a typical one-room schoolhouse, measuring 20 by 25 feet (6.1 m × 7.6 m). It has many artifacts, including models of ships and plans for the Friendship sloops.

== Geography ==
According to the United States Census Bureau, the town has an area of 31.37 square miles (81.25 km^{2}), of which 14.10 square miles (36.52 km^{2}) is land and 17.27 square miles (44.73 km^{2}) is water. On a peninsula that projects into the Gulf of Maine, Friendship lies between Muscongus Bay and the Friendship River. It includes several islands, the largest of which is Friendship Long Island (or Meduncook Island).

The town is crossed by state routes 97 and 220. It borders the towns of Waldoboro to the northwest, and Cushing to the east.

The town is the site of Franklin Island National Wildlife Refuge.

=== Climate ===
This climatic region is typified by large seasonal temperature differences, with warm to hot (and often humid) summers and cold (sometimes severely cold) winters. According to the Köppen Climate Classification system, Friendship has a humid continental climate, abbreviated "Dfb" on climate maps.

== Demographics ==
Historical population
Census	Pop.	Note	%±
1810	480		—
1820	587		22.3%
1830	634		8.0%
1840	725		14.4%
1850	691		−4.7%
1860	770		11.4%
1870	890		15.6%
1880	938		5.4%
1890	877		−6.5%
1900	814		−7.2%
1910	776		−4.7%
1920	696		−10.3%
1930	742		6.6%
1940	747		0.7%
1950	772		3.3%
1960	806		4.4%
1970	834		3.5%
1980	1,000		19.9%
1990	1,099		9.9%
2000	1,204		9.6%
2010	1,152		−4.3%
2020	1,142		−0.9%
U.S. Decennial Census

=== 2000 census ===
At the 2000 census, 1,204 people, 508 households, and 354 families resided in the town. The population density was 85.9 per square mile (33.2/km^{2}). There were 849 housing units at an average density of 60.5 per square mile (23.4/km^{2}). The racial makeup of the town was 99.34% White, 0.25% from other races, and 0.42% from two or more races. Hispanic or Latino of any race were 0.50% of the population.

There were 508 persons living alone who were 65 years of age or older. The average household size was 2.37 and the average family size was 2.76.

20.9% of the population were under the age of 18, 6.9% from 18 to 24, 26.2% from 25 to 44, 26.3% from 45 to 64 and 19.7% were 65 years of age or older. The median age was 43 years. For every 100 females, there were 97.7 males. For every 100 females age 18 and over, there were 97.5 males.

The median household income was $39,348 and the median family income was $41,648. Males had a median income of $29,605 and females $19,000. The per capita income was $20,409. About 8.3% of families and 11.0% of the population were below the poverty line, including 16.7% of those under age 18 and 11.0% of those age 65 or over.

=== 2010 census ===
At the 2010 census, there were 1,152 people, 508 households and 352 families residing in the town. The population density was 81.7 per square mile (31.5/km^{2}). There were 896 housing units at an average density of 63.5 per square mile (24.5/km^{2}). The racial makeup of the town was 99.2% White, 0.2% Asian, 0.3% from other races and 0.3% from two or more races. Hispanic or Latino of any race were 0.3% of the population.

There were 508 households, of which 21.3% had children under the age of 18 living with them, 56.7% were married couples living together, 7.9% had a female householder with no husband present, 4.7% had a male householder with no wife present and 30.7% were non-families. 24.2% of all households were made up of individuals, and 11.2% had someone living alone who was 65 years of age or older. The average household size was 2.27 and the average family size was 2.66.

The median age in the town was 50.1 years. 17.2% of residents were under the age of 18, 7% were between the ages of 18 and 24, 18.7% were from 25 to 44, 31.7% were from 45 to 64 and 25.3% were 65 years of age or older. The gender make-up of the town was 50.4% male and 49.6% female.

As of 2022, the population of Friendship was estimated at 1,162.

== Schools ==
Friendship is part of the Maine School Administrative District 40. Friendship Village Elementary School is in Friendship.

Medomak Valley Middle School and Medomak Valley High School are in nearby Waldoboro.

Friendship Public Library is in the community.

== Notable people ==
- Allen Alexander Bradford (1815–1888), delegate to the United States House of Representatives from Colorado Territory
