= Mabel Loomis Todd =

American writer and editor (1856–1932)

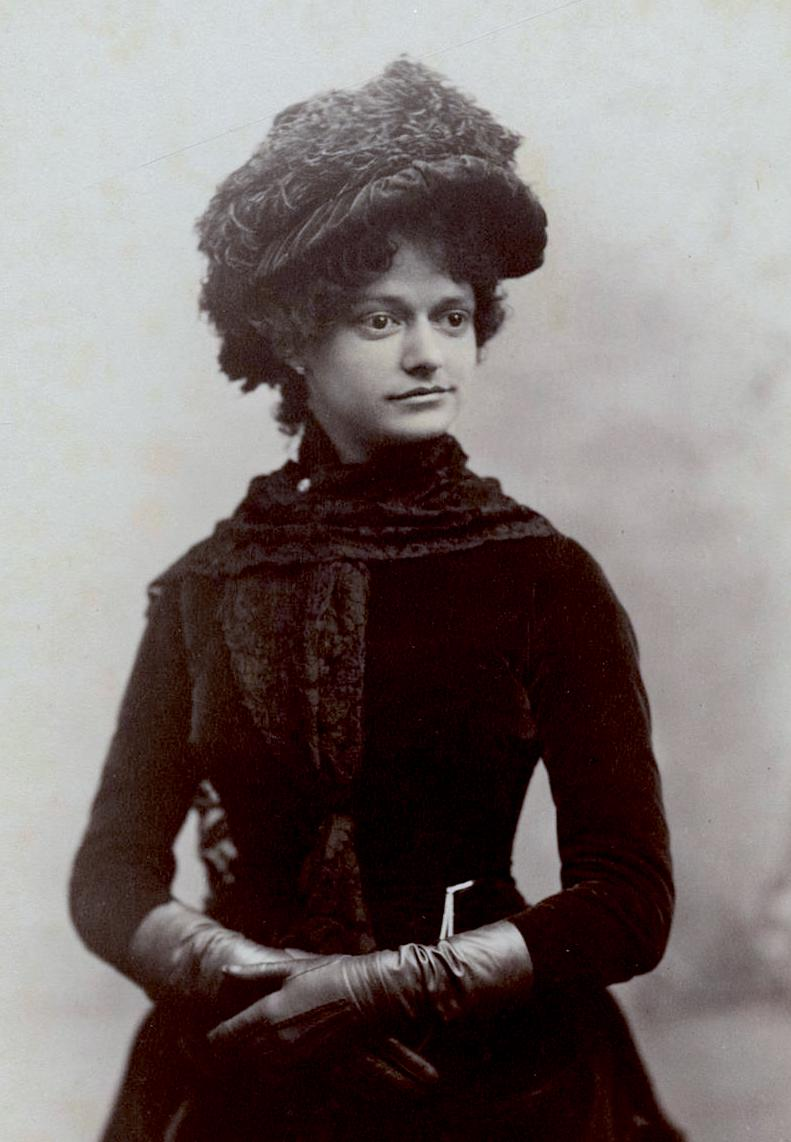
- Mabel Loomis Todd in 1883
- Born: Mabel Loomis; November 10, 1856; Cambridge, Massachusetts, U.S.
- Died: October 14, 1932 (aged 75); Hog Island, Maine, U.S.
- Occupations: Writer; editor
- Spouse: David Peck Todd (m. 1879–1932)
- Children: Millicent Todd Bingham
- Writing career
- Subject: Emily Dickinson

Mabel Loomis Todd (née Loomis; November 10, 1856 – October 14, 1932) was an American writer and editor. She is best remembered as the editor of posthumously published editions of Emily Dickinson's poetry and letters. She wrote several novels and books about her travels with her husband, astronomer David Peck Todd, as well as co-authoring a textbook on astronomy.

Todd's relationship to the Dickinson family was complicated. She had a lengthy affair with Emily's married older brother William Austin Dickinson. In preparing Emily's poetry for publication, which was also marred by family controversies, "she and co-editor Thomas Wentworth Higginson altered words, changed Dickinson's punctuation, capitalization and syntax to make her poetry closer to the conventions of 19th century verse. Perhaps most controversially, they gave names to poems that originally bore none (of Dickinson's close to 2000 known poems, perhaps only a dozen were given names by the poet, herself)."

== Biography ==
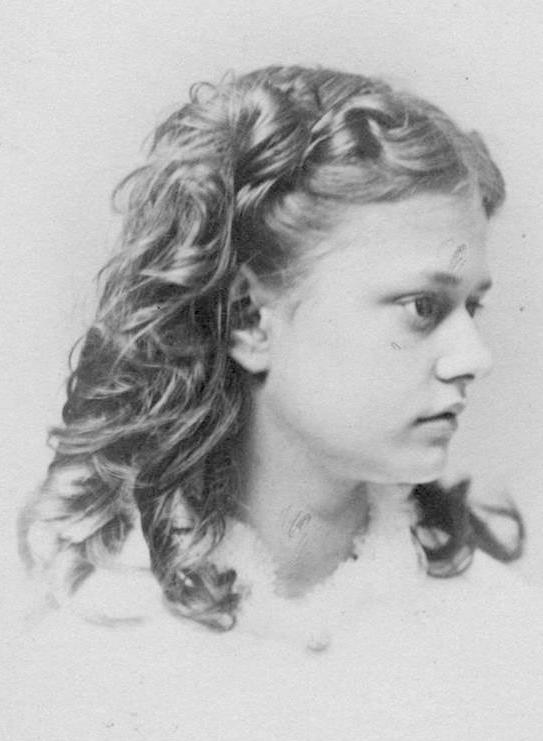
Mabel Loomis as a young girl, circa 1866

She was born Mabel Loomis on November 10, 1856, the daughter of Mary Alden Wilder and Eben Jenks Loomis. Though her family traced its lineage to such New England luminaries as Priscilla Alden, they led financially difficult lives and Mabel spent much of her childhood in boardinghouses in Cambridge, Massachusetts, and Washington, D.C. She graduated from Georgetown Female Seminary in Washington, then studied music at the New England Conservatory in Boston.

She met astronomer David Peck Todd in 1877, and evidently knew he was a philanderer even before their wedding on March 5, 1879. Mrs. Todd had a passionate sexual nature and wrote freely about it. She wrote soon after her marriage: "Sweet communions. Oh joy! Oh! Bliss unutterable" and "A little Heaven just after dinner." The couple had one daughter, Millicent Todd Bingham (1880–1968).

They moved to Amherst, Massachusetts, in 1881, where her husband had been offered a position as astronomy professor at his alma mater, Amherst College.

== In Amherst ==
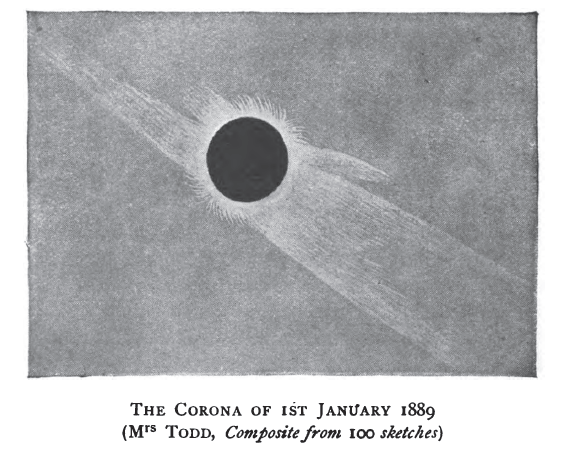
Todd sketched eclipses during her travels, which she published in her 1894 book Total Eclipses of the Sun.

In 1882, Todd began a 13-year affair with Austin Dickinson, the (married) brother of Emily Dickinson; Austin was a prominent local lawyer who served as treasurer of Amherst College. They took private trips to the country together, spent time together in Boston, and wrote love letters to each other. Though they tried to conceal the affair, many people were aware of it. Todd and Dickinson were convinced that their love was above the morals of the day; Mabel once wrote that she thought things might have been different "had we been born one or two hundred years" later.

Todd had been concerned over moving to a small town, as her life might not be as exciting as it had been in cosmopolitan Washington or Boston, but she soon found ample outlets for her energies. She joined the church choir, was active in local theatrical performances, and her diaries are full of accounts of activities – "coaching parties to Mount Toby or Titan's Pier, sugaring-off parties, bowling and archery contests, horseback riding – one June morning she speaks of riding to Leverett before breakfast – and even tobogganing".

She accompanied her husband David when he traveled to Japan in 1887 to photograph the solar eclipse, and she was the first Western woman to walk up Mount Fuji. She accompanied David in his other efforts to photograph eclipses, traveling with him back to Japan in 1896, to Tripoli in 1900 and 1905, to the Dutch East Indies in 1901, to Chile in 1907, and to Russia in 1914. In all, Mabel Loomis Todd traveled to more than 30 countries on five continents. She wrote frequently about her travels, and often lectured on them, making her a rare public female intellectual in the late 19th century.

The Russian trip was their last international voyage. They had planned to study the solar eclipse of August 21, 1914, but Russia had entered World War I on August 1 by declaring war on Germany, while the Todds were en route from Kiev to Moscow. In the resulting confusion the astronomers had to abandon their project and their equipment and flee the continent by way of Sweden and Denmark.

In 1893 she accompanied David to the World's Columbian Exposition in Chicago.

From 1894 to 1913 she worked on Village Improvement in Amherst, preserving old trees, and she supported Frederick Law Olmsted's plans for Amherst. The national organization of the Daughters of the American Revolution was founded in 1890, and Mabel was instrumental in starting local chapters – in 1896 she helped found the Mary Mattoon chapter in Amherst and the Betty Allen chapter in Northampton. She helped found the Amherst Woman's Club in 1893 and was instrumental in founding the Amherst Historical Society in 1902 and in securing its permanent home in the Strong House in Amherst.

She was a talented painter, and had studied music – harmony, singing, and piano – at the New England Conservatory in Boston. While she was in Amherst she started a music club; she also gave lessons in painting, singing, and piano. When she turned 40, in 1896, she stopped singing in public.

From 1890 to 1913 she went on regular lecture tours up and down the east coast, as far south as Florida and as far west as California, talking about her travels and other topics of interest. Between 1880 and 1913 she wrote or edited twelve books and hundreds of articles on literature, astronomy, and travel.

By 1917, David's deteriorating health and erratic mental behavior caused Amherst president Alexander Meiklejohn to force his early retirement from the College, and the couple moved to Coconut Grove, Florida. Mabel and their daughter Millicent made the decision to institutionalize David in 1922; for the remainder of his life he was in and out of different mental and care facilities. Mabel continued to advocate for civic causes, especially preservation of nature and the wilderness; she was one of the people involved with the creation of the Everglades National Park, and the island she owned in Maine - Hog Island (Lincoln County, Maine) - was donated to the Audubon Society by her daughter, saving it from development.

Mabel Loomis Todd died of a cerebral hemorrhage on October 14, 1932, on Hog Island, Maine. She and David are buried in Wildwood Cemetery, Amherst, Massachusetts, in a plot near Austin Dickinson's family plot.

== Editor of Dickinson's poetry ==
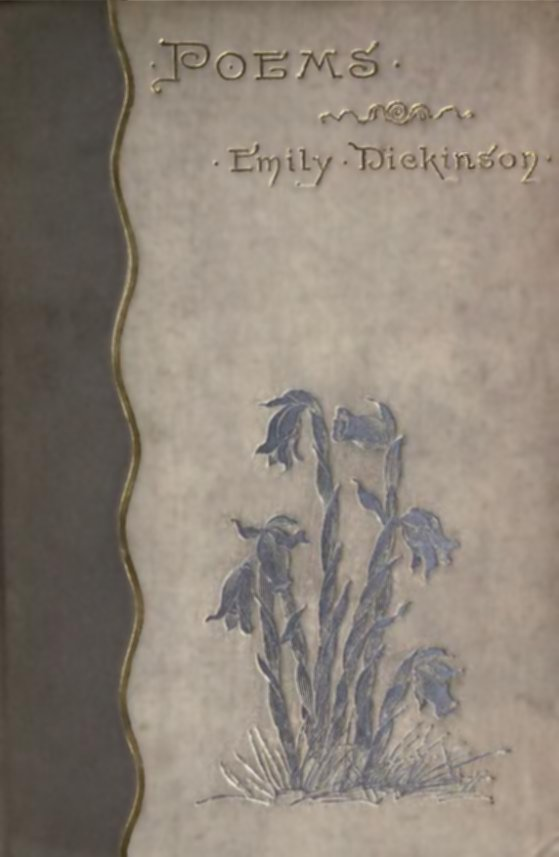
Cover of Dickinson's Poems, 1890

Todd never met Emily Dickinson, though the two women exchanged letters. The influence of Mabel Loomis Todd in the world of Dickinson scholarship has been much debated. Her first reference to Dickinson came in a letter to Todd's parents dated November 6, 1881, a couple of months after moving to Amherst, in which she references Dickinson's reclusive nature and claims the latter has not left the house in 15 years. She refers to her as "a lady whom the people call the Myth. She is a sister of Mr. Dickinson, & seems to be the climax of all the family oddity".

After Dickinson's death in 1886, her younger sister Lavinia Norcross Dickinson destroyed all her letters, as Emily had instructed. Dickinson had left no instructions for her poems, however, and originally asked her sister-in-law Susan Dickinson to oversee their publication. When Susan's work did not quickly move the publication project forward—Susan wanted to publish the poems in a holistic volume contextualized with Dickinson's letters, jokes, manuscripts, and drawings, a publication that would be very unconventional for the time but perhaps more authentic to Dickinson's writings—Lavinia enlisted Todd and Thomas Wentworth Higginson. The first volume of Poems by Emily Dickinson was published in 1890, and included many alterations by Todd and Higginson. Higginson, who had supported Emily's writing in her lifetime and was a friendly correspondent, also collaborated with Todd on Poems: Second Series in 1891. Todd edited a two volume set of Dickinson's letters (1894) and Poems: Third Series (1896) on her own. A detailed account of the publication process is given in Ancestors' Brocades, by Millicent Todd Bingham (1945). According to scholar Brenda Wineapple, the third book, without Higginson's pleas to alter as little as possible, "is the most expurgated". This notion, however, is contradicted by the account written by Bingham, who claimed that her mother wished to alter Dickinson's poems as little as possible.

The relationship between Todd and the Dickinson family, however, proved difficult. Emily's younger sister Lavinia, who controlled the copyright of the poems, wanted to give royalty payments to Todd herself instead of having the publisher divide proceeds. In fact, for the work Todd did on three volumes of Emily Dickinson's poetry and two volumes of letters, she received a total of $200 from Lavinia. In 1896, Todd and the Dickinson family had a falling-out over a legal battle regarding property owned by Austin Dickinson. Austin had left Todd and her husband a strip of his land and Lavinia had begun the process to make it legal before changing her mind and suing them in 1898 for the claim. She won the lawsuit but Todd refused to continue the project during Lavinia's lifetime. As a result of their disagreements, Emily Dickinson's manuscripts were split between the two families.

Martha Dickinson Bianchi, the poet's niece, inherited the poet's manuscripts from her mother Susan, except for those in Todd's possession. Between 1913 and 1937, she produced six books of Emily's poetry and two biographies, occasionally with assistance from Alfred Leete Hampton. Todd, upset at the rival publications and assuming only she had legal rights to Emily's works, released an updated edition of her compilation in 1931. In 1945, Todd's daughter Millicent Todd Bingham published some of the poems from Todd's portion of the manuscripts. By 1955, she had published three more books about the life and works of the Amherst poet.

== Works ==
=== Original works ===
- Todd, Mabel Loomis (1883). Footprints. OCLC 2692762.
- —— (1894). Total Eclipses of the Sun. Columbian Knowledge Series. Boston: Roberts Brothers. OCLC 3838009.
- —— (1898). Corona and Coronet: Being a Narrative of the Amherst Eclipse Expedition to Japan. Boston and New York: Houghton, Mifflin and Company. OCLC 931060.
- —— (1906). Witchcraft in New England. Springfield, MA: F.A. Bassette Company. OCLC 528846.
- —— (1910). A Cycle of Sunsets. Boston: Small, Maynard and Co. OCLC 3837985.
- —— (1912). Tripoli the Mysterious. Boston: Small, Maynard and Co. OCLC 4725475.

=== Edited volumes ===
Todd, Mabel Loomis, ed. (1896) A Cycle of Sonnets. Boston: Roberts Brothers.

==== Poems of Emily Dickinson ====
- Dickinson, Emily (1890). Todd, Mabel Loomis; Higginson, T. W. (eds.). Poems by Emily Dickinson. Boston: Roberts Brothers. OCLC 551319074.
- —— (1891). Todd, Mabel Loomis; Higginson, T. W. (eds.). Poems, Second Series. Boston: Roberts Brothers. OCLC 858413163.
- —— (1896). Todd, Mabel Loomis (ed.). Poems, Third Series. Boston: Roberts Brothers. OCLC 29187960.

==== Letters of Emily Dickinson ====
- Dickinson, Emily (1894). Todd, Mabel Loomis (ed.). Letters of Emily Dickinson 1830–1886. Boston: Roberts Brothers. OCLC 776139426.

==== Other poems ====
- Whiton-Stone, Cara E. (1896). Todd, Mabel Loomis (ed.). A Cycle of Sonnets. Boston: Roberts Brothers. OCLC 558426696.

=== Articles (selected) ===
- —— (May 1895). "Emily Dickinson's Letters". The Bachelor of Arts. 1 (1): 39–66.

=== Manuscripts ===
- —— (1982). Mabel Loomis Todd Papers. OCLC 122552303.
