= Muscongus Bay =

Bay on the coast of Maine, USA

Coordinates: 43.916°N 69.39°W

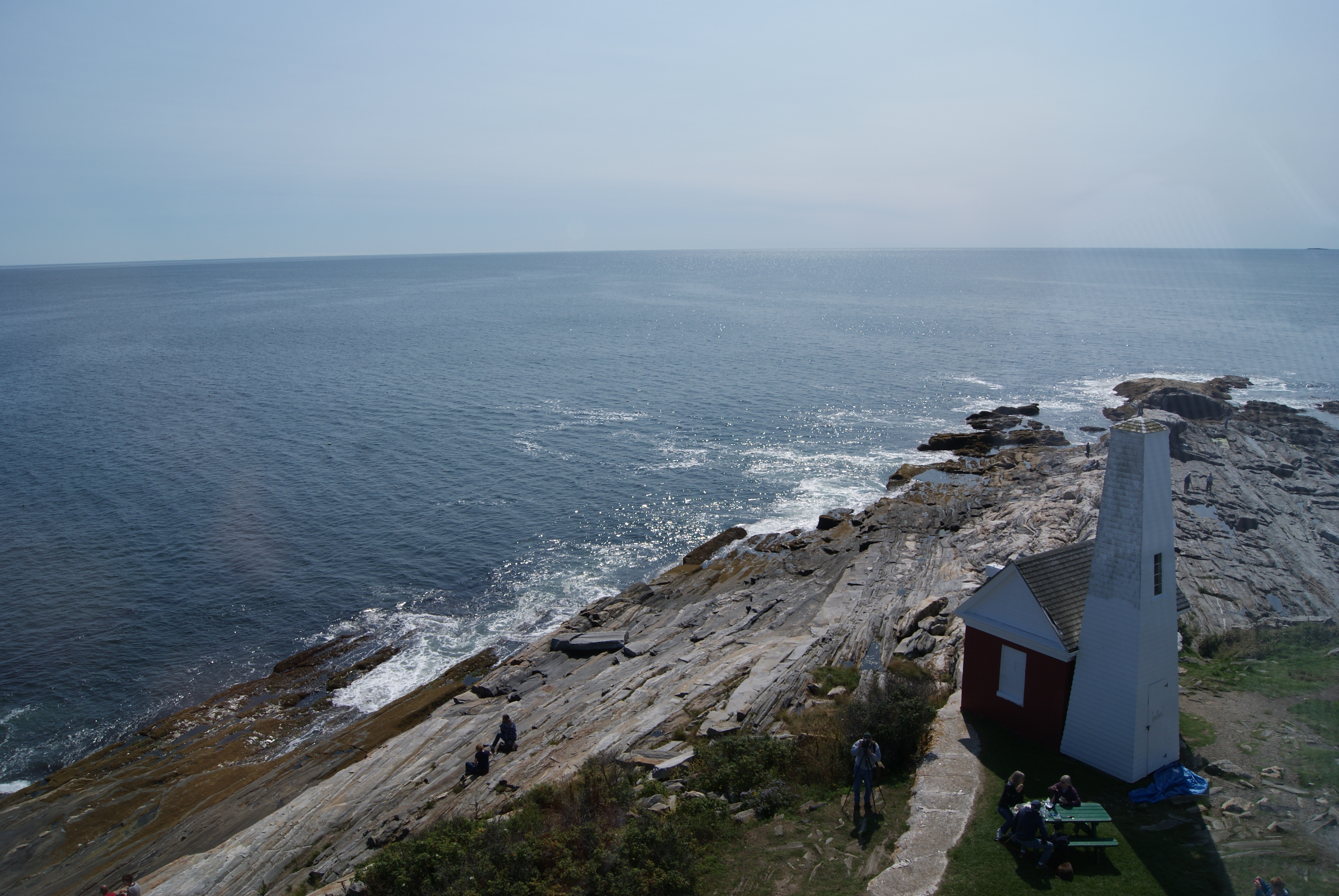
The southwest tip of Muscongus Bay at the Pemaquid Point Lighthouse

Muscongus Bay is a bay on the coast of Maine, United States, between Penobscot Bay and John's Bay. Muscongus was the name of an Abenaki village meaning "fishing place" or "many [or large] rock ledges." John Smith recorded the river in 1616 as Nusconcus and was also spelled Nuscongus. The two main tributaries are the St. George River at its eastern end and the Medomak River, which flows into the bay at Waldoboro. Historically, the Medomak River and Muscongus Bay were the dividing line between the Waldo Patent and Pemaquid Patent and Waldoboro was a customs point of entry. Muscongus Bay has many islands including Hog which is home to a National Audubon Society camp, Allen, Eastern Egg Rock, Franklin (home of Franklin Island National Wildlife Refuge), and Louds Island historically referred to as Muscongus Island prior purchase from Thomas Drowne by William Loud. Monhegan Island is offshore from Muscongus Bay. The Maine Island Trail passes through Muscongus Bay.

The bay is bounded by Marshall Point Light, Pemaquid Point Light, and contains Franklin Island Light.

Towns bordering Muscongus bay are Bristol, Bremen, Waldoboro, Friendship, Cushing, and St. George.

The type of sailboat called the Muscongus Bay sloop is also known as the Friendship Sloop. The hull of the five-masted schooner Cora F. Cressey lies in Muscongus Bay.
