= David Peck Todd =

American astronomer

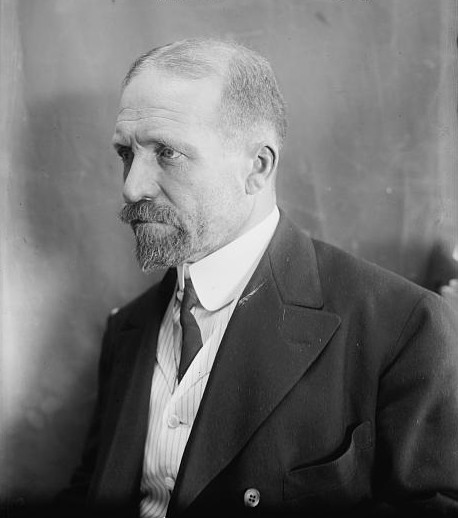
David Peck Todd

David Peck Todd (March 19, 1855 – June 1, 1939) was an American astronomer. He produced a complete set of photographs of the 1882 transit of Venus.

== Biography ==
Todd was born in Lake Ridge, New York, the son of Sereno Edwards Todd and Rhoda (Peck) Todd. He prepared at John C. Overhiser's School in Brooklyn. He studied at Columbia University from 1870 to 1872, then at Amherst College from 1873 to 1875, where he graduated Phi Beta Kappa in the class of 1875. He earned his M.A. from Amherst in 1878. He was awarded an honorary degree from Washington and Jefferson College in 1888.

Todd worked at the US Naval Observatory from 1875 to 1878, and at the US Nautical Almanac Office from 1878 to 1881. From 1881 to 1917 he was a professor of astronomy and director of the observatory at Amherst College. From 1882 to 1887, he was also a professor of astronomy and higher mathematics at nearby Smith College.

He married Mabel Loomis on March 5, 1879, and together they had one daughter, Millicent Todd Bingham. His wife had had an affair with William Austin Dickinson, the (married) brother of Emily Dickinson. The affair was an open secret in Amherst, and David Todd seems to have accepted it willingly.

By 1917, David's deteriorating health and erratic mental behavior caused Amherst president Alexander Meiklejohn to force his early retirement from the College, and the couple moved to Coconut Grove, Florida. In 1922 Mabel and Millicent made the difficult decision to have David institutionalized; for the remainder of his life he was in and out of various mental and care facilities.

== Astronomical and other accomplishments ==
Todd designed and erected several observatories, including those at Smith College from 1886 to 1888 and at Amherst College from 1903 to 1906. He established Standard Time in Peru in 1907. He was chief astronomer at the Lick Observatory during the transit of Venus in 1882, and created the first known photographs of the transit. At the time of the 2004 Transit of Venus, astronomers at the Lick Observatory found and animated Todd’s still photos.

He was a member of the American Astronomical Society, the Philosophical Society of Washington, and the Japan Society. He was fellow of the American Association for the Advancement of Science, the Society of Natural and Physical Sciences, Cherbourg, France; the Sociedad Geografica de Lima, Peru. In 1896 he was presented, by the Emperor of Japan, with the Imperial Saké Cup for services in the cause of education in Japan.

In addition, Todd was the organizer and leader of a number of important astronomical expeditions:

- The New England expedition to Texas for solar eclipse of July 29, 1878
- The American expedition to Japan for solar eclipse of August 19, 1887
- A U. S. scientific expedition to West Africa in 1889 and 1890
- The Amherst expedition to Japan for the solar eclipse of August 9, 1896
- The Lowell expedition to Tripoli for solar eclipse of May 28, 1900
- The Amherst eclipse expedition to the Dutch East Indies in 1901
- The Lowell Mars expedition to the Andes, 1907
- Expedition to Tripoli for the solar eclipse of August 30, 1905
- Expedition to Russia for solar eclipse of August 21, 1914
- Expedition to Florida for solar eclipse of June 8, 1918
- Expedition to Brazil and Argentina for solar eclipse of May 29, 1919

Todd crater on Phobos (a moon or satellite of Mars) is named after him. In addition, asteroids 511 Davida and 510 Mabella are named after him and his wife.

== Letter from James Clerk Maxwell to Todd ==
On the 19th of March 1879, Maxwell wrote a letter to Todd. After Maxwell's death in November 1879, Todd sent the letter to G. G. Stokes, who read the letter in January 1880 at a meeting of the Royal Society.

In 1879, the last year of his life, Maxwell wrote to the astronomer David Todd (1855–1939), at the Nautical Almanac Office in Washington, D.C., asking whether the data on the eclipses of Jupiter's moons were accurate enough to detect the Earth's motion through the ether. In that letter he comments on the "impossibility" of earthbound optical experiments for this purpose. The letter came to the attention of a colleague of Todd, Albert Michelson (1852–1932), who had already carried out the best measurement, as of that time, of the speed of light in air.

== Writings ==
- Astronomy: The Science of the Heavenly Bodies. New York: Harper, 1922

Todd was also the author of New Astronomy; Stars and Telescopes, and many shorter articles. He edited the Columbian Knowledge Series of monographs.
