= Seal Island National Wildlife Refuge =

Island off the coast of Maine, United States

- IUCN category IV (habitat/species management area)
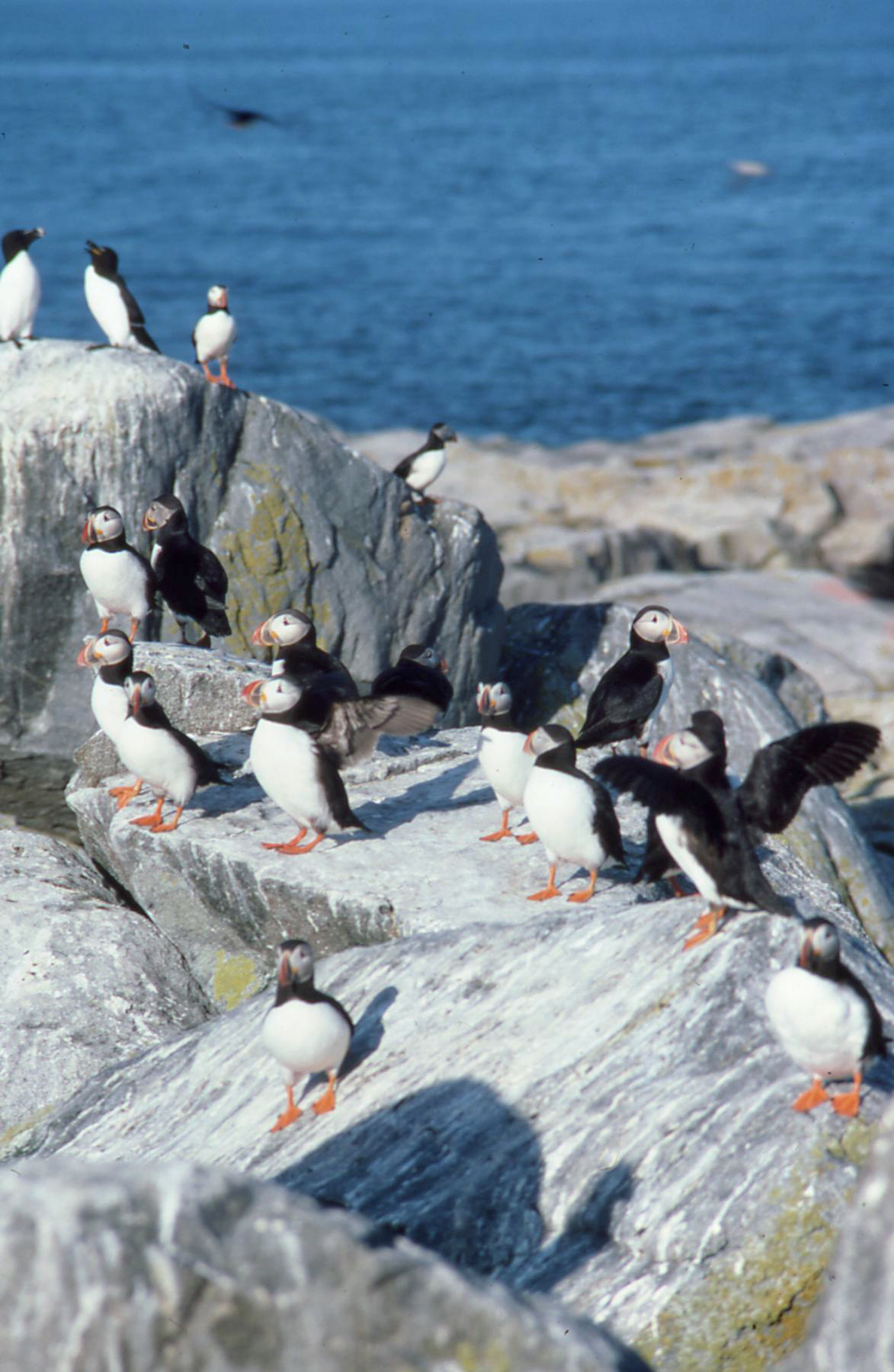
- Atlantic puffins and razorbills on Seal Island

- Location within the United States
- Location: Knox County, Maine, United States
- Nearest city: Vinalhaven, Maine
- Coordinates: 43°53′17″N 68°44′24″W
- Area: 65 acres (26 ha)
- Established: 1972
- Governing body: U.S. Fish and Wildlife Service
- Website: Seal Island National Wildlife Refuge

Seal Island National Wildlife Refuge is a 1-mile-long (1.6 km) island off the coast of Maine, United States near Matinicus Island that is part of the Maine Coastal Islands National Wildlife Refuge. During any given summer season, over 100 species of birds are observed by researchers on the island. It is home to colonies of many types of seabirds, including Atlantic puffins, double-crested cormorants, razorbills, common murres, Leach's storm petrels, eiders, and black guillemots. Seal Island is the last refuge for the dwindling great cormorant population in the Gulf of Maine, with 35 pairs in 2018. A policy of eliminating predatory gulls preceded the recolonization of the island by a large mixed band of Arctic terns and common terns.

During the Cold War, the island was used as a gunnery range and bombing test site for the United States Navy. Unexploded ordnance remains on the island, though some of it was detonated by a fire in the late 1970s. The ordnance presents no real danger to refuge staff or interns.

Seal Island NWR has a surface area of 65 acres (26 ha). It is part of the Town of Vinalhaven.
