= Sweetser =

Sweetser may refer to:

- Charles H. Sweetser (1841–1871), American author and journalist
- Charles Sweetser (1808–1864), American politician
- Eve Sweetser, American linguist
- Frank L. Sweetser (1874–1953), American pioneer management consultant
- Henry Edward Sweetser (1837–1870), American newspaper and magazine editor.
- Jess Sweetser (1902–1989), American amateur golfer
- Kate Dickinson Sweetser (1870-1939), American fiction author
- Moses Forster Sweetser (1848–1897), American biographer and travel writer
- Lewis H. Sweetser (1868–1944), American politician
- Wesley D. Sweetser (1919–2006), American literary critic

== See also ==
- Sweetser, Indiana
- Sweetzer
- Switzer (disambiguation)
