= Cristanne Miller =

American academic

- Born: 1953 (age 72–73)
- Education: University of Chicago (PhD, 1980)
- Occupations: Literary scholar, professor
- Employer: University at Buffalo
- Notable work: Emily Dickinson's Poems: As She Preserved Them (2016); Marianne Moore: Questions of Authority (1995); Cultures of Modernism (2005)
- Title: SUNY Distinguished Professor and Edward H. Butler Professor of English
- Awards: MLA Scholarly Edition Prize; University at Buffalo President’s Medal (2018); Fulbright Tocqueville Distinguished Chair; Alexander von Humboldt Fellowship

Cristanne Miller (born 1953) received her PhD in 1980 from the University of Chicago, and was for many years the W.M. Keck Distinguished Service Professor at Pomona College. Since 2006 she has taught at the University at Buffalo in New York, where she is SUNY Distinguished Professor and Edward H. Butler Professor of English. She is the author of a number of books whose subjects include Emily Dickinson, Marianne Moore, and modernism.

== Writing ==
=== Emily Dickinson ===
Miller established herself as a scholar of Emily Dickinson with the publication in 1987 of Emily Dickinson: A Poet's Grammar. This was reviewed positively in Nineteenth-Century Literature. According to Tom Paulin's review in the London Review of Books, "Miller works from the assumption that Dickinson sees herself 'oppositionally, defining her position in the world negatively, by distance from some social construct or law'. And Miller shows how those negations have a constructive role." Since 1987, Miller has published several other influential authored or edited books on Dickinson including Reading In Time: Dickinson in the Nineteenth Century (University of Massachusetts Press, 2012) and the monumental edition of Dickinson's poems, Emily Dickinson's Poems: As She Preserved Them (Harvard University Press, 2016), which received the Modern Language Association award for Best Scholarly Edition. She completed a new edition of Dickinson’s complete letters, co-edited with Domhnall Mitchell: The Letters of Emily DIckinson (Harvard University Press, The Belknap Press, 2024). It appeared on many "best books" lists for 2024. The Selected Letters of Emily Dickinson (also co-edited with Domhnall Mitchell) will appear in March 2027 (Harvard University Press, The Belknap Press).

=== Modernism ===
Miller has also published on Marianne Moore and modernist poetry, including essays or books on Moore, Mina Loy, Else Lasker-Schuler, Elizabeth Bishop, modernism in New York and Berlin, and gender and modernism.

In 1996 she published Marianne Moore: Questions of Authority, which was reviewed positively in the London Quarterly and in American Literature. The review in American Literature described it as "revisionary". In 1997 Miller published Selected Letters of Marianne Moore (Knopf, 1997), which she co-edited with Bonnie Costello and Celeste Goodridge. This was listed by The New York Times as one of the notable books of 1997. In 2007, she published Cultures of Modernism, which was reviewed positively in Modernism/modernity.

In 2015, Miller founded the Marianne Moore Digital Archive, which is publishing in digitized, transcribed, and annotated facing-page format all 122 of Moore’s working notebooks, including notebooks she kept for reading, conversation, poetry drafts, lectures, concerts, and finances, along with miscellaneous manuscripts, tools, and publications contextualizing the notebooks. Miller continues as director of this archive.

== Awards and positions ==
Miller’s grants and awards include an Alexander von Humboldt Foundation fellowship at the Free University of Berlin; awards from the Newberry Library, the National Endowment for the Humanities, and the American Council of Learned Societies; a Rothermere Institute of American Studies fellowship at Oxford University; and a Fulbright Tocqueville Distinguished Chair Award at the University of Paris 7 Diderot. Miller received the MLA Scholarly Edition Prize for her edition of Dickinson’s complete poems, Emily Dickinson’s Poems: As She Preserved Them (Harvard University Press, 2016); this edition has also been translated into Portuguese (trans: Adalberto Müller, Os Fascículos de Emily Dickinson, 2021). In 2018, she received the University of Buffalo President’s Medal for Excellence in Scholarship and Service.

Miller has served as Chair of the Department of English at both Pomona College (1996–97; 1998-2000; 2003–04) and the University at Buffalo SUNY (2006-2013; Interim chair 2015-2017), and has additionally served as editor of the Emily Dickinson Journal, as President of the Emily Dickinson International Society and of the Modernist Studies Association, and as Director of the Marianne Moore Digital Archive. She is Director of the Arts Management Program at the University at Buffalo (2019 - ), where she founded and currently co-directs the Digital Scholarship Studio & Network (2019 - ).

== Selected publications ==
- Cristanne Miller, Emily Dickinson: A Poet's Grammar. Harvard University Press, 1987. [Chapter reprinted in New Century Views of Emily Dickinson, ed. Judith Farr; Prentice-Hall, 1996.]
- Cristanne Miller, Comic Power in Emily Dickinson. Co-authored with Suzanne Juhasz and Martha Nell Smith. University of Texas Press, 1993.
- The Women and Language Debate: A Sourcebook. Co-edited with Camille Roman and Suzanne Juhasz. Rutgers University Press, 1994. Online edition with netlibrary.com, 1999.
- Feminist Measures: Soundings in Poetry and Theory. Co-edited with Lynn Keller. University of Michigan Press, 1994.
- Cristanne Miller, Marianne Moore: Questions of Authority. Harvard University Press, 1995.
- Selected Letters of Marianne Moore. Co-edited with Bonnie Costello and Celeste Goodridge. Knopf, 1997.
- The Emily Dickinson Handbook. Co-edited with Roland Hagenbuchle and Gudrun Grabher. University of Massachusetts Press, 1998; second printing 2004.
- Cristanne Miller, Cultures of Modernism: Marianne Moore, Mina Loy, Else Lasker-Schuler. Gender and Literary Community in New York and Berlin. University of Michigan Press, 2005.
- 'Words for the Hour': A New Anthology of American Civil War Poetry. Co-edited with Faith Barrett. University of Massachusetts Press, 2005.
- Critics and Poets on Marianne Moore: 'A right good salvo of barks'. Co-edited with Linda Leavell and Robin G. Schulze. Bucknell University Press, 2005.
- Cristanne Miller, "Gender and Sexuality in Modernist Poetry." Cambridge Companion to Modernist Poetry. Eds. Alex Davis and Lee Jenkins. Cambridge, UK: Cambridge University Press, 2007. 68-84.
- Cristanne Miller, "Tongues 'loosened in the melting pot': The Poets of Others and the Lower East Side." Modernism/Modernity 14.3 (Fall 2007): 455-476.
- Cristanne Miller, "Distrusting: Marianne Moore on Feeling and War in the 1940s." American Literature, 80.2 (2008): 353-379.
- Cristanne Miller, "Dickinson's Structured Rhythms," in A Companion to Emily Dickinson, ed. Martha Nell Smith and Mary Loeffelholz Blackwell Publishing, 2008, pp. 391–414.
- Cristanne Miller, "Drum-Taps—Revision and Reconciliation." Walt Whitman Quarterly 26.4 (Spring 2009): 171-96.
- Cristanne Miller, Reading In Time: Dickinson in the Nineteenth Century. University of Massachusetts Press, 2012.
- Dickinson In Her Own Time: A Biographical Chronicle of Her Life, Drawn from Recollections, Memoirs, and Interviews by Friends and Associates. Co-edited with Jane Eberwein and Stephanie Farrar. University of Iowa Press, 2015.
- Cristanne Miller, ed. Emily Dickinson's Poems: As She Preserved Them. Harvard University Press, 2016.
- Whitman & Dickinson: A Colloquy. Co-edited with Éric Athenot. University of Iowa Press, 2017.
- Poetics and Precarity, in the series The Creeley Lectures on Poetry and Poetics. Co-edited with Myung Mi Kim. SUNY Press, 2018.
