= Henry Sedley =

Henry Sedley may refer to:

- Henry Sedley (actor)
- Henry Sedley (journalist)
- Sir Henry Sedley, 3rd Baronet, of the Sedley baronets
