= The Devil's Partner =

The Devil's Partner may refer to:

- The Devil's Partner (1923 film), an American silent film
- The Devil's Partner (1926 film), an American silent Western film
- Devil's Partner, also known as The Devil's Partner, a 1961 black-and-white American supernatural horror film
