= Sweetzer =

Sweetzer may refer to:

- Billy Sweetzer (born 1958), Canadian association football player
- Gordon Sweetzer (born 1957), Canadian association football player
- Jimmy Sweetzer (born 1960), Canadian association football player

== See also ==
- Sweetser
- Switzer (disambiguation)
