= Switzers =

Switzers may refer to:

- Swiss people, of Switzerland
- Swiss mercenaries, in older usage
- Switzers, New Zealand, now known as Waikaia, a town in New Zealand

== See also ==
- Switzer (disambiguation)
