= Round Table (magazine) =

American literary weekly magazine (1864–1869)

The Round Table was an American literary weekly magazine, active from 1864 to 1869. Published in New York City, it was founded by Charles H. Sweetser and his brother Henry E. Sweetser, who were its first editors. Later editors included Dorsey Gardner and Henry Sedley.

== Background ==
A veritable magazine-publishing "mania" happened in the United States right after the American Civil War, so intense that the publishers of the Round Table feared it would burn itself out, with "every successful writer becoming possessed of a magazine of his own". An indication of the reading audience's thirst for frequent new literary material was that many magazines became monthly or weekly, rather than quarterly, as had been the custom. The Round Table was one of those weeklies. Actually started during the war, it struggled and ceased publication, to resume after the war was over, with the subtitle "Saturday Review of Politics, Finance, Literature, Science, and Art". Frank Luther Mott described it as "trenchant and aggressive", and primarily a "journal of opinion".

== History ==
=== First run ===
The magazine was started, as a weekly quarto sixteen pages long, in December of 1863 by Charles H. Sweetser and his brother Henry. Charles was a recent Amherst graduate, and his brother an editor at the New York World. While the editors wrote much of the material they also established a "rather informal staff" of writers in cities on the East Coast and in Chicago. From the beginning it was outspoken in its criticism--of the Civil War, of New York politics and corruption, of the religious press, and of loose manners.

Its focus was really on literature, which it aimed to criticize, choosing "mutual detestation" over a "mutual admiration style of reviewing". Contributions were anonymous but it listed authors and editors, which included Richard Henry Stoddard, Thomas Bailey Aldrich, Edmund Clarence Stedman, William Winter, George Arnold, and particularly David G. Croly, who had worked with Henry Sweetser at the New York World. Other frequent contributors were William Dean Howells, Edmund Clarence Stedman, and Richard Henry Stoddard. In religious matters, esp. in the early days, the magazine considered itself of a higher standard than the religious press; on women's manners and education, it was unabashedly conservative on women's dress and, in what Mott called "rather ill-written remarks", it condemned higher education for women (specifically at Vassar College) in 1864, and was not above fat-shaming a woman in an 1868 Henry James story.

The magazine also reviewed art exhibits and theater productions. It prided itself on a certain objectivity and professionalism in its theater review, saying that too many publications left that to "long-haired and dirty-nailed men and unhooped and uncombed women". Rising costs, because of the war, caused it to stop publication in the summer of 1864.

=== Continuation ===
Suspended from July 1864 until September 1865, its publication resumed under the Sweetser brothers, with Henry replaced by Dorsey Gardner in 1866. Later that same year, Henry Sedley was added as editor, and Charles Sweetser subtracted, Gardner to last as editor until 1868 leaving Sedley as the sole editor for the magazine's final year. At the time of Sedley's introduction, The Publisher's Circular praised the magazine as being "honourably distinguished by its abstinence from the use of the pastepot and scissors, upon which so many of its American contemporaries are entirely dependent". Sedley had bought out control from Dorsey, although Dorsey continued on as a contributor.

Sedley became chief assistant to editor George Shepherd, at The New York Times in 1870.
