= Success is counted sweetest =

Poem by Emily Dickinson

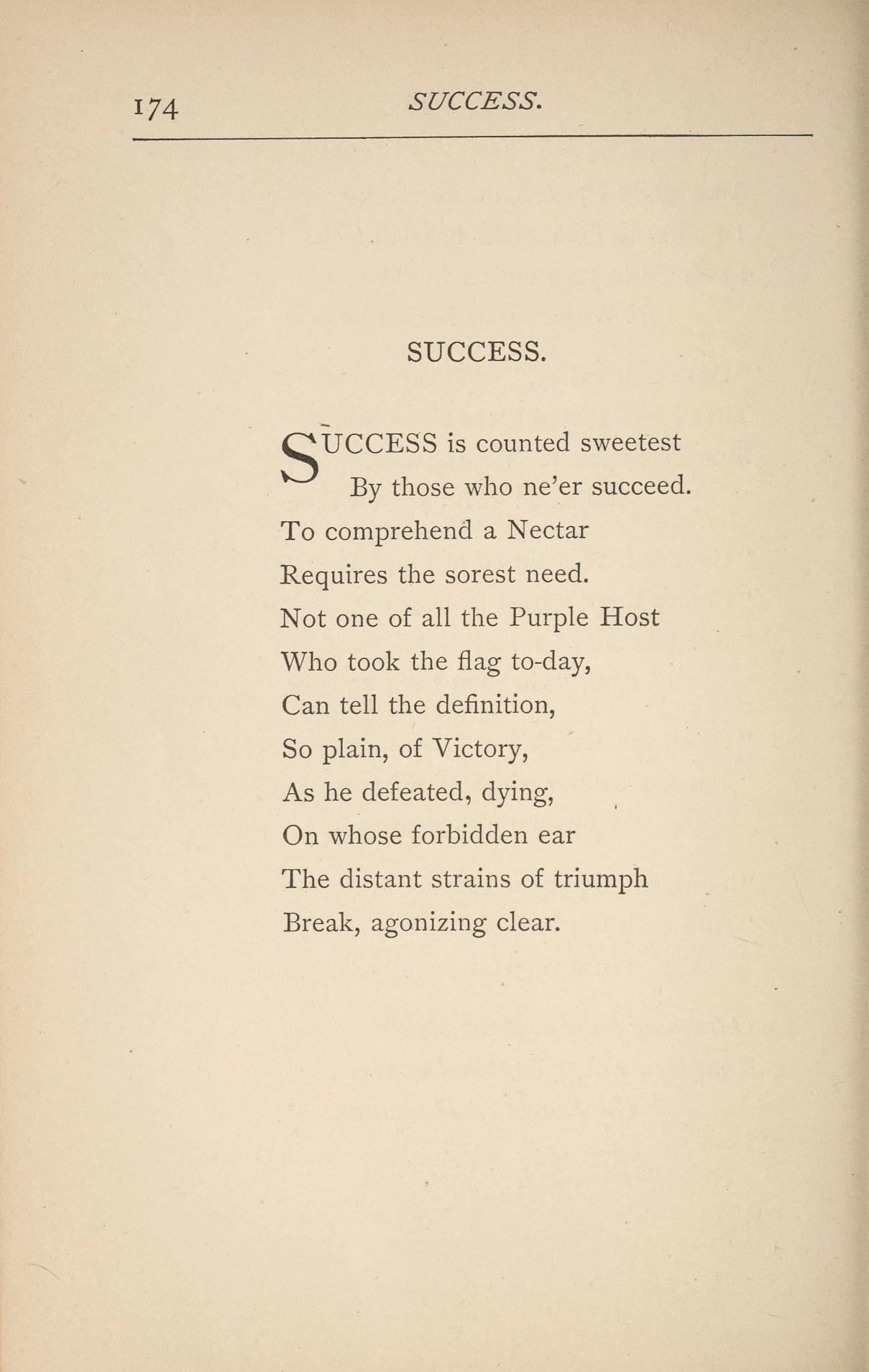
As first published under the title "Success" in A Masque of Poets, 1878

"Success is counted sweetest" is a lyric poem by Emily Dickinson written in 1859 and published anonymously in 1864. The poem uses the images of a victorious army and one dying warrior to suggest that only one who has suffered defeat can understand success.

== Text ==
Success is counted sweetest
By those who ne'er succeed.
To comprehend a nectar
Requires sorest need.

Not one of all the purple Host
Who took the Flag today
Can tell the definition
So clear of victory

As he defeated – dying –
On whose forbidden ear
The distant strains of triumph
Burst agonized and clear.

== Publication history ==
The poem was written in 1859 and first published anonymously in the Brooklyn Daily Union on April 27, 1864. It was republished in the anthology A Masque of Poets (1878) as part of a series of books published without writers' names. The book, edited by George Parsons Lathrop, was published by Roberts Brothers. Helen Hunt Jackson, who contributed her own writing to the book, urged Dickinson to contribute in a letter dated August 20, 1876. She then traveled to Amherst, Massachusetts to speak with Dickinson in person on the same topic on October 10. Dickinson initially resisted and asked Thomas Wentworth Higginson to say he disapproved of a contribution. Jackson insisted, nevertheless, and urged her friend to contribute a poem to give pleasure to "somebody somewhere whom you do not know." Jackson wrote again in April 1878 and suggested she send "Success is counted sweetest" as she already knew it by heart. It was published as "Success" in the book, though the publisher Thomas Niles admitted it "was slightly changed in phraseology."

Jackson wrote to Dickinson after the book's publication, "I suppose by this time you have seen the Masque of Poets. I hope you have not regretted giving me that choice bit of verse for it." Jackson published a review noting that "Success" was "undoubtedly one of the strongest and finest wrought things in the book", but offered that speculation on its authorship would be a wasted effort. Readers believed it was written by Ralph Waldo Emerson.

== Analysis ==
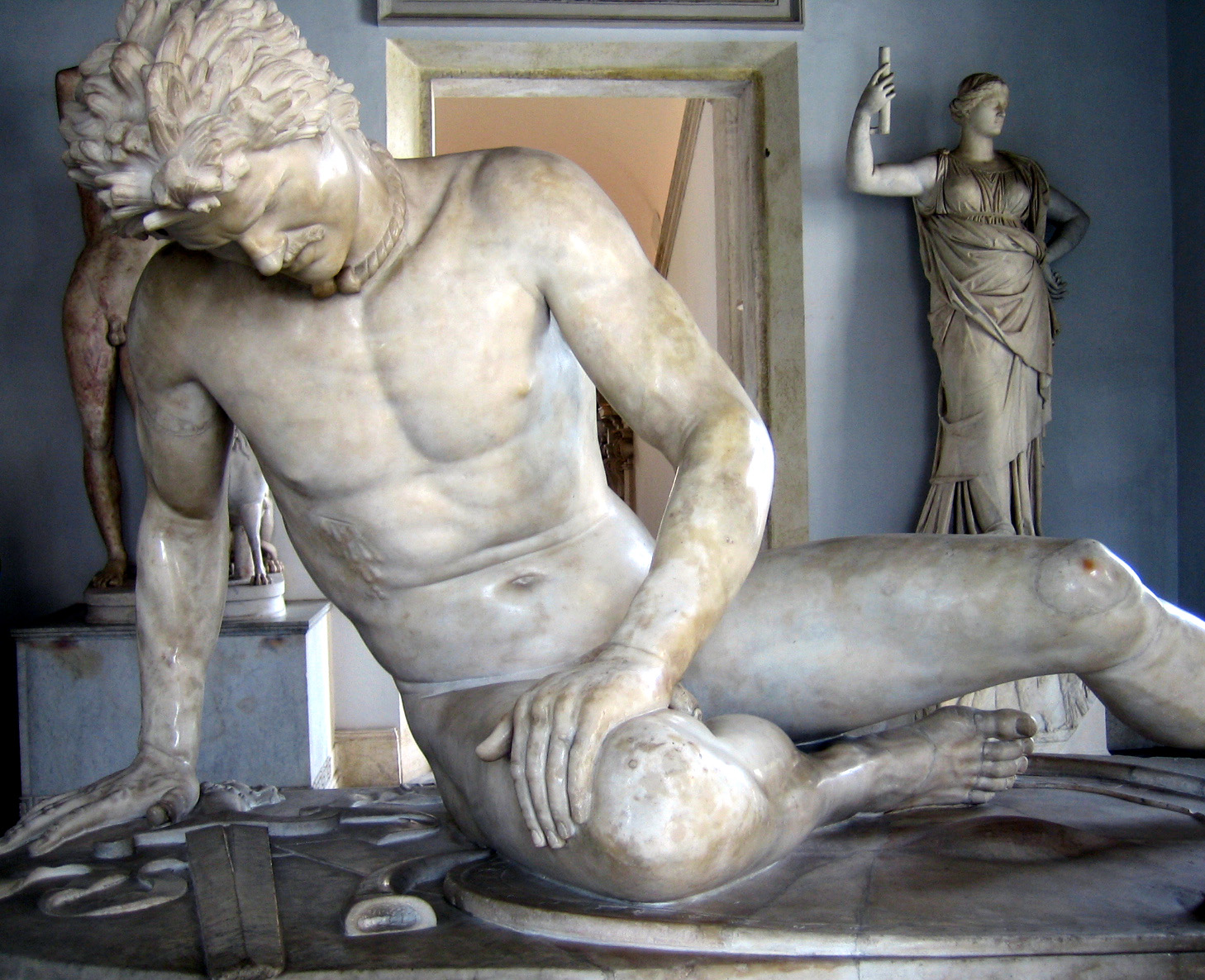
A Celtic warrior dies upon his shield and sword (Roman marble copy of a Hellenistic original)

The poem's three unemotional quatrains are written in iambic trimeter with only line 5 in iambic tetrameter. Lines 1 and 3 (and others) end with extra syllables. The rhyme scheme is abcb. The poem's "success" theme is treated paradoxically: Only those who know defeat can truly appreciate success. Alliteration enhances the poem's lyricism. The first stanza is a complete observation and can stand alone. Stanzas two and three introduce military images (a captured flag, a victorious army, a dying warrior) and are dependent upon one another for complete understanding.

Harold Bloom indicates "Success" was one of Dickinson's earliest manuscript poems and one of only seven poems published during her lifetime. Its theme was one she returned to a number of times during her literary career, as in "Water, is taught by thirst." The poem, Bloom writes, is one of Dickinson's more "masculine" poems and "emphasizes the power of desire and equates desire with victory." From a Christian perspective, Bloom explains, the sounds bursting on the dying warrior's ear may be heavenly music as he passes to his eternal rest. Although Dickinson's poems are often read as poems of losing at romance, Bloom points out that the popularity of "Success" can be attributed to the fact that the poem's "message can be applied to any situation where there are winners and losers."
