= The Emily Dickinson Journal =

- Discipline: Literature
- Language: English
- Edited by: James Guthrie; Suzanne Juhasz (founding editor)

Publication details
- History: 1991–present
- Publisher: Johns Hopkins University Press (United States)
- Frequency: Biannually

Standard abbreviations
- ISO 4: Emily Dickinson J.

Indexing
- ISSN: 1059-6879 (print); 1096-858X (web)
- OCLC no.: 37937179

Links
- Journal homepage; Online access

The Emily Dickinson Journal (EDJ) is a biannual academic journal founded by Suzanne Juhasz (University of Colorado) in 1991, and it is the official publication of the Emily Dickinson International Society. The journal provides an ongoing examination of Emily Dickinson, one of the most influential American poets, and her place in literature. The previous editor was Dr. Cristanne Miller (University at Buffalo), and the current editor is Dr. James Guthrie (Wright State University). He is interested in expanding the Journal to encompass Dickinson's relations to 19th-century American studies as well as her impact on 20th-century poets. The journal is published by the Johns Hopkins University Press and receives submissions internationally.

== Editors and managing editors (2010-2020) ==
=== Dr. James Guthrie, Wright State University ===
- Judy Cronenwett & MacKenzie Guthrie (2019–2020)
- Esther Sorg & Mike Fallen (2018–2019)
- Sarah Hamic & Ben Wiechmann (2017–2018)
- Sarah Hamic & Ben Wiechmann (2016–2017)
- Sonora Humphreys & Sebastian Williams (2015–2016)

=== Dr. Cristanne Miller, University at Buffalo ===
- Andrew Dorkin & Daniel Schweitzer (2014–2015)
- Alison Fraser & Andrew Dorkin (2013–2014)
- Patricia Chaudron & Alison Fraser (2012–2013)
- Patricia Chaudron & Allison Siehnel (2011–2012)
- Allison Siehnel & Justin Parks (2010–2011)
