= A Masque of Poets =

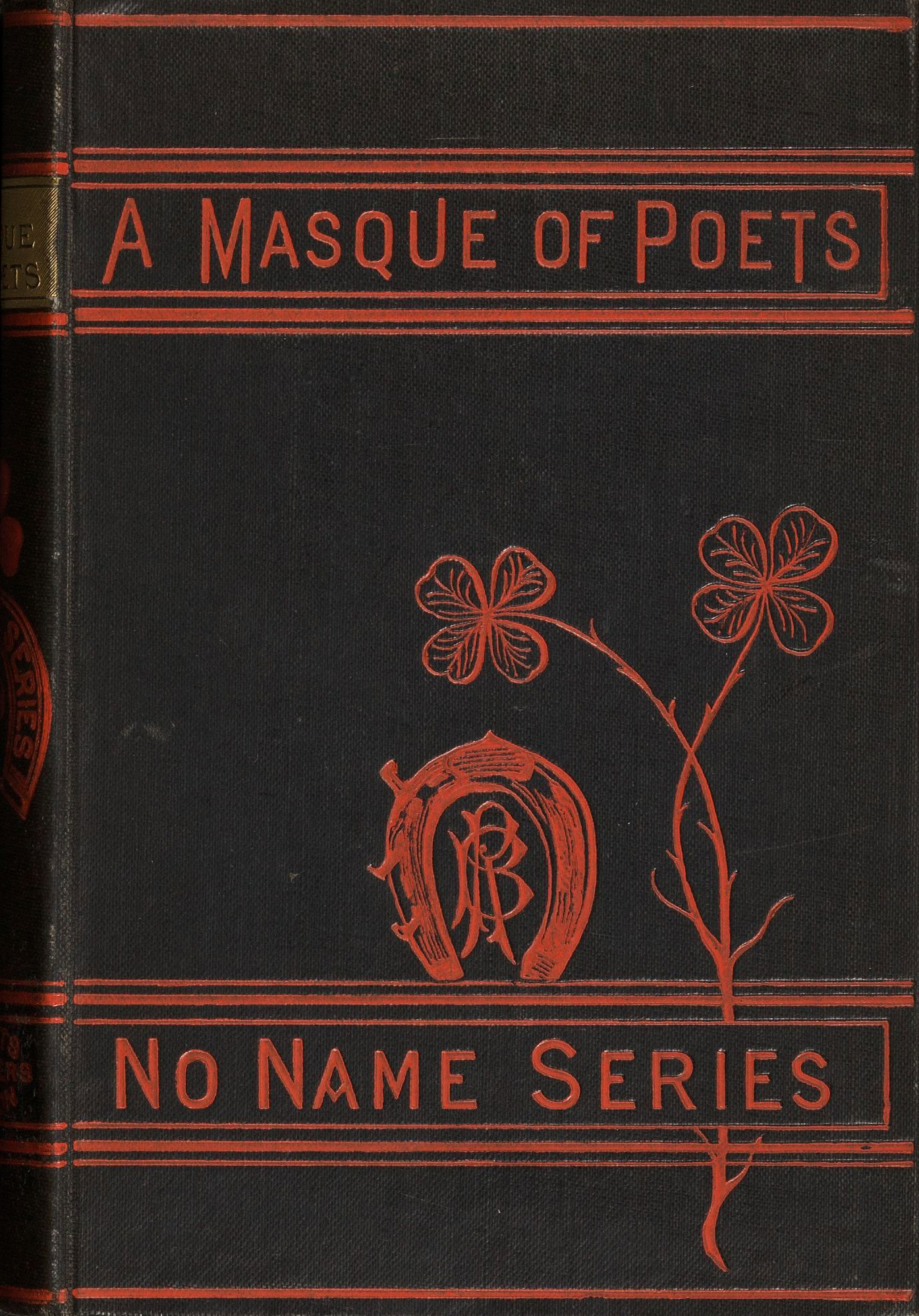
Cover of A Masque of Poets, 1878

A Masque of Poets is an 1878 book of poetry published in the United States. The book included several poems, all published anonymously, including one by Emily Dickinson. Names were not included in the compilation so that the original works could be judged on their own merit without any preconceived notions about the poet.

== Background ==
The book compiled 68 poems as well as a "novellette in verse" titled Guy Vernon. The book was published by Roberts Brothers as part of their "No Name" series and included both American and British poets. The series was meant to allow readers to enjoy literature based on its inherent merit without knowing the author's popularity. As the New York Graphic reported, readers were "forced to trust more to their own taste and judgment, and rely less on reputations". Harper's Magazine also wrote of the series:

"The idea is a good one, not only because it will pique the curiosity of the reader, but also because it will put the writers on their mettle to do their best, and absolutely prevent that trading on reputation which is the greatest vice of American litterateurs."

A Masque of Poets was edited by the poet George Lathrop and its contributors included Amos Bronson Alcott, Louisa May Alcott, Thomas Bailey Aldrich, Ellery Channing, Annie Adams Fields, James T. Fields, Sidney Lanier, Rose Hawthorne Lathrop, James Russell Lowell, Louise Moulton, Christina Rossetti, Franklin Benjamin Sanborn, Edmund Clarence Stedman, Celia Thaxter, and Sarah Chauncey Woolsey. Guy Vernon, the long piece that concluded the book, was written by John Townsend Trowbridge.

Emily Dickinson, who rarely published poetry in her lifetime, contributed her poem "Success is Counted Sweetest" (published as "Success") at the urging of Helen Hunt Jackson. Jackson first wrote to Dickinson to encourage a contribution on August 20, 1876, before attempting to persuade her in person on October 10. Dickinson appealed to Thomas Wentworth Higginson to tell Jackson he disapproved of a contribution, but Jackson insisted: "You say you find great pleasure in reading my verses", she wrote to Dickinson, "Let somebody somewhere whom you do not know have the same pleasure in reading yours." She revived the idea in April 1878 and offered to send the poem now known as "Success is Countest Sweetest" because she already knew it by heart.

After the book's publication, Jackson wrote to Dickinson, "I suppose by this time you have seen the Masque of Poets. I hope you have not regretted giving me that choice bit of verse for it." Jackson also published a review of the book, singling out "Success" as "undoubtedly one of the strongest and finest wrought things in the book", before noting conjecture on the poem's authorship would be worthless. Dickinson thanked the publisher Thomas Niles for including her poem, to which he responded somewhat apologetically: "you have doubtless perceived [it] was slightly changed in phraseology."
