= Commercial Advertiser =

American newspaper (1793–1904)

The New-York Commercial Advertiser was an American evening newspaper. It originated as the American Minerva in 1793, changed its name in 1797, and was published, with slight name variations, until 1904.

== History ==
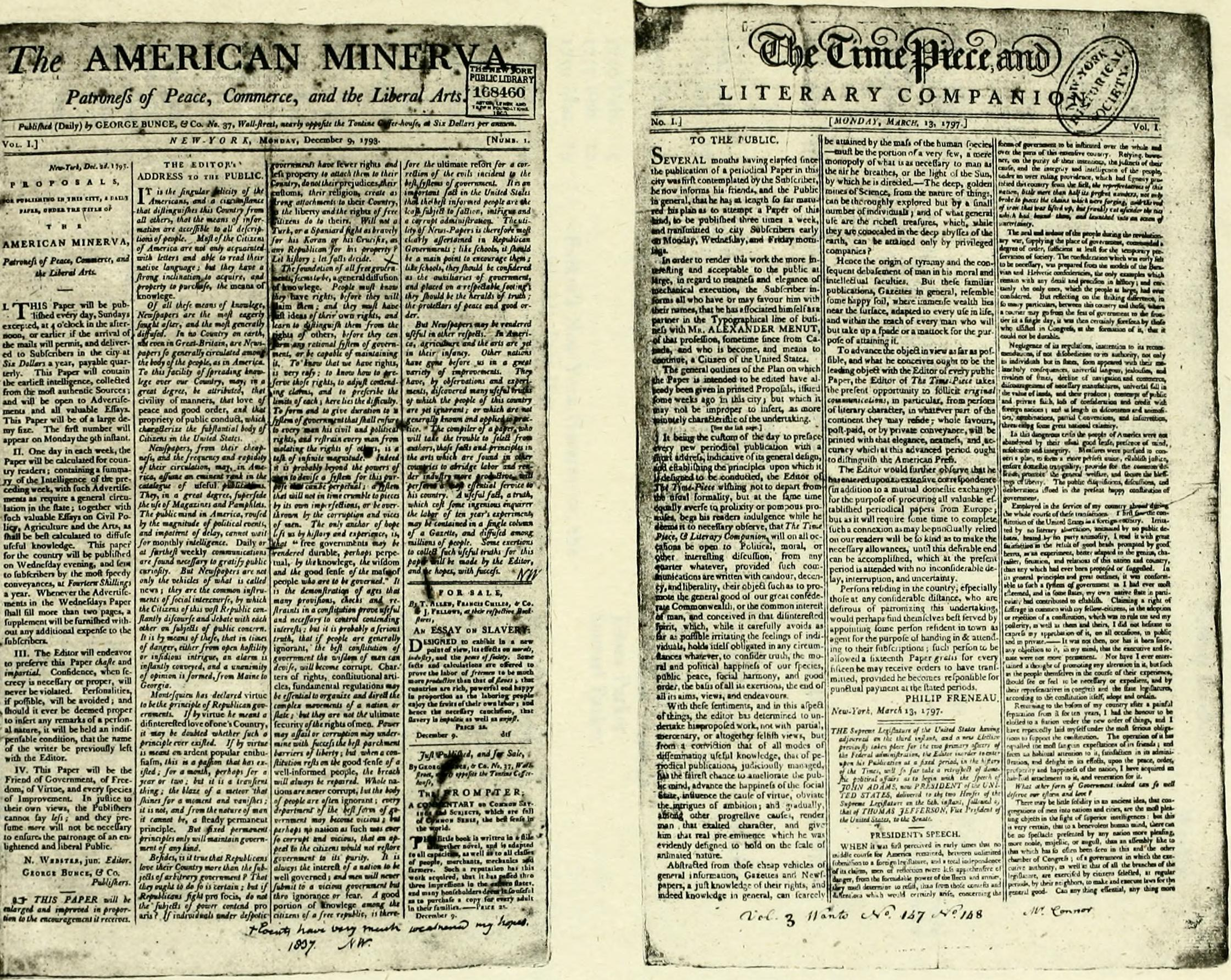
American Minerva, Dec. 9, 1793.

The paper had its origins in the American Minerva, founded in 1793 by Noah Webster. Its first edition was published on December 9, 1793. It went through a few name changes in its first few years before settling on the Commercial Advertiser in September 1797. Webster's involvement with the paper ended in 1803, and Zachariah Lewis replaced him as publisher. Under Webster and Lewis, the paper generally was a supporter of the Federalists.

Lewis retired in 1820 and the paper taken over by William Leete Stone Sr. and Francis Hall. In 1831, Stone was physically attacked by William Cullen Bryant, editor of the rival New York Evening Post with whom he had had a few disputes. Stone remained at the paper until his death in 1844. In 1840, Stone was sued in one of the libel lawsuits brought by author James Fenimore Cooper.

John B. Hall purchased Stone's stake in the paper. Francis Hall served as editor from 1844 until he retired in 1863, and William L. Hurlbut became editor from 1863 to 1867. Thurlow Weed then became editor briefly, followed by Hugh Hastings by 1868. In 1886, Parke Godwin purchased the paper from the estate of Hastings. Henry Sedley also acquired part of the paper in the 1880s, and became its editor.

John A. Cockerill, former editor of the New York World, took over as editor of the paper in 1891, where he lasted three years. H.J. Wright took over as editor in 1897, replacing Foster Coates.

Lincoln Steffens wrote for the Commercial Advertiser in the 1890s.

A semi-weekly paper called the New-York Spectator, intended for subscribers outside of the city, was also published by the paper for many years.

== Rebranding as The Globe ==
On February 1, 1904, the Commercial Advertiser was revamped and renamed The Globe and Commercial Advertiser. and generally known as The New York Globe from that point forwards. In 1923, newspaper owner and consolidator Frank Munsey bought the Globe. Munsey merged the Globe into the New York Sun, thus ending what Time magazine described at the time as the "oldest daily newspaper in the United States".

== Chronology of names ==
- American Minerva, Patroness of Peace, Commerce and the Liberal Arts
- March 1794: American Minerva and the New-York (Evening) Advertiser
- May 1795: American Minerva: An Evening Advertiser
- April 1796: Minerva & Mercantile Evening Advertiser
- September 1797: Commercial Advertiser
- January 1804: New-York Commercial Advertiser
- October 1809: Commercial Advertiser
- January 1831: New-York Commercial Advertiser
- September 1889: The Commercial Advertiser
- December 1892: New York Commercial Advertiser
- June 1895: The Commercial Advertiser
- February 1904: The Globe and Commercial Advertiser
