= Lawrence Buell (academic) =

American academic

Lawrence Buell

Lawrence Ingalls Buell (born 1939) is Powell M. Cabot Professor of American Literature Emeritus at Harvard University and a foundational figure of ecocriticism. He is the 2007 recipient of the Jay Hubbell Medal for lifetime achievement in American literary studies from the Modern Language Association. He won the 2003 Warren–Brooks Award for literary criticism for his 2003 book on Ralph Waldo Emerson. His Writing for an Endangered World won the 2001 John G. Cawelti Award for the best book in American culture studies from the Popular Culture Association. He retired from Harvard in 2011.

== Life and work ==
Buell earned an A.B. at Princeton University in 1961 before enrolling at Cornell University for his Ph.D., which he was awarded in 1966. He was assistant professor and then professor at Oberlin College from 1966 until he moved to Harvard in 1990.

He was a Guggenheim Fellow in 1987. He was the 2007 recipient of the Jay Hubbell Medal for lifetime achievement in American literary studies from the Modern Language Association.

=== Harvard ===
Buell served as the Harvard College Dean of Undergraduate Education from 1992–1996; during his tenure he set the precedent of weekly walk-in office hours open to all students. He later chaired the English department and served on the committee of the Graduate Program on History of American Civilization.

Buell has been regularly asked for commentary by The Boston Globe and The Harvard Crimson concerning his views on undergraduate life. Buell was part of the first class of Harvard College Professorships in 1998, a now-annual award for undergraduate teaching at Harvard University. The award comes with a semester of paid leave or an equivalent fund to support their scholarly work.

He has been a professor emeritus at Harvard since retiring in 2011.

=== Family ===
Buell's mother, Marjorie Henderson Buell, was the creator of the Little Lulu comic strip, begun in the 1930s, under the pen name Marge. In July 2006, Lawrence Buell and his brother Fred donated her papers to the Schlesinger Library at Harvard. The papers include a collection of fan letters, comic books, scrapbooks, and a complete set of the newspaper cartoons. The then-president of Harvard and then-dean of the Radcliffe Institute Drew Gilpin Faust had suggested the donation after discovering that Marge was Buell’s mother.

Lawrence Buell's brother Fred is a poet, literary critic, and professor at Queens College, New York.

== Research interests ==
Buell's research interests include American literature, cultural history of the United States, transcendentalism, and ecocriticism.

=== Transcendentalism ===
==== Emerson ====
Buell's book Emerson was published in 2003. The book won critical acclaim, receiving the 2003 Warren-Brooks Award. The jury commended its "elegant, clear-speaking style, notably free of pretentious academic jargon."

Thinking Disobediently

In October 2023, Buell published Henry David Thoreau: Thinking Disobediently, a continuation of his research on transcendentalist authors. Buell has said that, similar to Emerson, this book is aimed for the general public.

=== Ecocriticism ===
He is widely considered a pioneer of ecocriticism, although his 2005 book The Future of Environmental Criticism uses "environmental criticism" in lieu of ecocriticism in both the title and preface to the book, claiming this usage as a "strategic ambiguity" which distances his work from a "cartoon image" of the field "no longer applicable today, if indeed it ever really was."

His book Writing for an Endangered World won the 2001 John G. Cawelti Award for the best book in American culture studies from the Popular Culture Association.

== Bibliography ==
- Literary Transcendentalism: Style and Vision in the American Renaissance (Cornell University Press, 1973)
- The Morgesons and Other Writings, Published and Unpublished, by Elizabeth Stoddard (editor with Sandra A. Zagarell, University of Pennsylvania Press, 1984)
- New England Literary Culture: From Revolution through Renaissance (Cambridge University Press, 1986)
- The Environmental Imagination: Thoreau, Nature Writing, and the Formation of American Culture (Harvard University Press, 1995)
- Writing for an Endangered World: Literature, Culture, and Environment in the United States and Beyond (Harvard University Press, 2001)
- Emerson (Harvard University Press, 2003)
- The Future of Environmental Criticism: Environmental Crisis and Literary Imagination (Wiley-Blackwell, 2005)
- The American Transcendentalists: Essential Writings (editor, Modern Library, 2006)
- Shades of the Planet: American Literature as World Literature (editor with Wai Chee Dimock, Princeton University Press, 2007)
- The Dream of the Great American Novel (Harvard University Press, 2014)
- Henry David Thoreau: Thinking Disobediently (Oxford University Press, 2023)
- Henry David Thoreau: A Very Short Introduction (Oxford University Press, 2025)
