= Warren–Brooks Award =

The Warren–Brooks Award for literary criticism was established to honor the innovative, critical interpretation of literature offered by Robert Penn Warren and Cleanth Brooks to celebrate the continuation of such achievement. It is awarded for outstanding literary criticism originally published in English in the United States of America and is given in those years when a book, or other worthy publication, appears that exemplifies the Warren–Brooks effort in spirit, scope, and integrity.

The award is given annually by the advisory group of the Center for Robert Penn Warren Studies at Western Kentucky University for outstanding literary criticism originally published in English in the United States.

== Past Recipients ==
Past winners of the award include:

- 1995: Simpson, Lewis P., The Fable of the Southern Writer, LSU Press, 1995
- 1996: Winchell, Mark Royden, Cleanth Brooks and the Rise of Modern Criticism, University of Virginia Press, 1996
- 1997: Hollander, John, The Work of Poetry, Columbia University Press, 1997
- 1998: Donoghue, Denis, The Practice of Reading, Yale University Press, 1998
- 1999: Schuchard, Ron, Eliot's Dark Angel, Oxford University Press, 1999
- 2000: Kermode, Sir Frank, Shakespeare's Language, Farrar, Straus, Giroux, 2000
- 2001: Murphy, Paul V., The Rebuke of History North Carolina Press, 2001
- 2002: Burt, Stephanie, Randall Jarrell and His Age Columbia University Press, November 2002
- 2003: Buell, Lawrence, Emerson, The Belknap Press of Harvard University Press, 2003
- 2004: (shared) Justus, James H., Fetching the Old Southwest, University of Missouri Press; Perloff, Marjorie, Differentials, University of Alabama Press
- 2005: Hassett, Constance W., “Christina Rossetti: The Patience of Style,” University of Virginia Press, 2005
- 2006: Rosen, David, Power, Plain English, and the Rise of Modern Poetry, Yale University Press, 2006
- 2007: Dolven, Jeff, Scenes of Instruction in Renaissance Romance, University of Chicago Press, 2007
- 2008: Brinkmeyer, Robert Jr., The Fourth Ghost: White Southern Writers and European Fascism, 1930-1950, Louisiana State University Press, 2008
- 2009: Travis, Peter, Disseminal Chaucer: Rereading the Nun's Priest's Tale, University of Notre Dame Press, 2009
- 2010: Payne, Mark, The Animal Part: Human and Other Animals in the Poetic Imagination, University of Chicago Press, 2010
- 2011: Strier, Richard, The Unrepentant Renaissance: From Petrarch to Shakespeare to Milton, University of Chicago Press, 2011
- 2012: Martin, Meredith, The Rise and Fall of Meter: Poetry and English National Culture, 1860-1930, Princeton University Press, 2012
- 2013: Brombert, Victor, Musings on Mortality: Tolstoy to Primo Levi, University of Chicago Press, 2013
- 2014: Russell, Richard Rankin, Seamus Heaney's Regions, University of Notre Dame Press, 2014
- 2015: Keniston, Ann, Ghostly Figures: Memory and Belatedness in Postwar American Poetry, University of Iowa Press, 2015
- 2016: Ravinthiran, Vidyan, Elizabeth Bishop's Prosaic, Bucknell University Press, 2016
- 2017: Costello, Bonnie, The Plural of Us: Poetry and Community in Auden and Others, Princeton University Press, 2017
- 2018: Polley, Diana Hope, Echoes of Emerson: Rethinking Realism in Twain, James, Wharton, and Cather, University Alabama Press, 2017
- 2019: Fulford, Tim, Wordsworth's Poetry, 1815-1845, University of Pennsylvania Press, 2019
- 2020: Shifflett, Joan Romano, Warren, Jarrell, & Lowell: Collaboration in the Reshaping of American Poetry, Louisiana State University Press, 2020
- 2021: Quayson, Ato, Tragedy and Postcolonial Literature, Cambridge University Press, 2021
- 2022: Menely, Tobias, Climate and the Making of Worlds: Toward a Geohistorical Poetics, University of Chicago Press, 2021
