= Bonnie Costello =

American literary scholar

Bonnie Costello (born 1950) is an American literary scholar, currently the William Fairfield Warren Distinguished Professor of English at Boston University. Her books include works on the poets Marianne Moore, Elizabeth Bishop, and W. H. Auden, and the relation of visual art to poetry through landscape painting and still life.

== Books ==
Costello's books include:

- Marianne Moore: Imaginary Possessions (Harvard University Press, 1981)
- Elizabeth Bishop: Questions of Mastery (Harvard University Press, 1991)
- Shifting Ground: Reinventing Landscape in Modern American Poetry (Harvard University Press, 2003)
- Planets on Tables: Poetry, Still Life and the Turning World (Cornell University Press, 2008)
- The Plural of Us: Poetry and Community in Auden and Others (Princeton University Press, 2017)

With Celeste Goodridge and Cristanne Miller she edited The Selected Letters of Marianne Moore (Knopf, 1997), which The New York Times listed as one of the notable books of 1997.

== Education and career ==
Costello is a 1972 graduate of Bennington College. Her doctorate is from Cornell University, in 1977. She joined the Boston University faculty in 1977, and became Warren Distinguished Professor in 2017.

== Recognition ==
Costello was elected to the American Academy of Arts and Sciences in 2002. She also became a Guggenheim Fellow in 1990, and a fellow of the American Council of Learned Societies in 2011.

Her book The Plural of Us: Poetry and Community in Auden and Others won the Warren–Brooks Award for 2017.
