= Henry Edward Sweetser =

American editor (1837–1870)

- Born: February 19, 1837; New York City, U.S.
- Died: February 17, 1870 (aged 32); New York City, U.S.
- Occupations: Newspaper and magazine editor

Henry Edward Sweetser (February 19, 1837 – February 17, 1870) was an American newspaper and magazine editor.

Sweetser was the son of Joseph A., and Catherine (Dickinson) Sweetser, aunt of poet Emily Dickinson. He was born in New York City, February 19, 1837. He graduated from Yale College in 1858. The first year after his graduation was spent in the store of his father (firm of J. A Sweetser & Co.) in New York City, after which he was for a few months a reporter for The New York Times. In June 1860, he entered the office of the New York World, of which he soon became night-editor. In November 1863, with Charles Humphreys Sweetser, his cousin, he started the Round Table, the publication of which, suspended in August 1864, was resumed in June 1865; during this interval, he returned to the office of the World. (In March 1864, the Round Table published Dickinson's "Some keep the Sabbath going to Church", one of only ten poems to appear in print in her lifetime, and the only one published in a magazine.) He withdrew from the Round Table in May 1866, and, after a short visit to Europe, in September of the same year again joined the World and was connected with it chiefly as city editor and editor of the weekly and semi-weekly editions, until his death. He died suddenly in New York City, on February 17, 1870, aged 38 years.

This article incorporates public domain material from the Yale Obituary Record.
