= Charles H. Sweetser =

American journalist

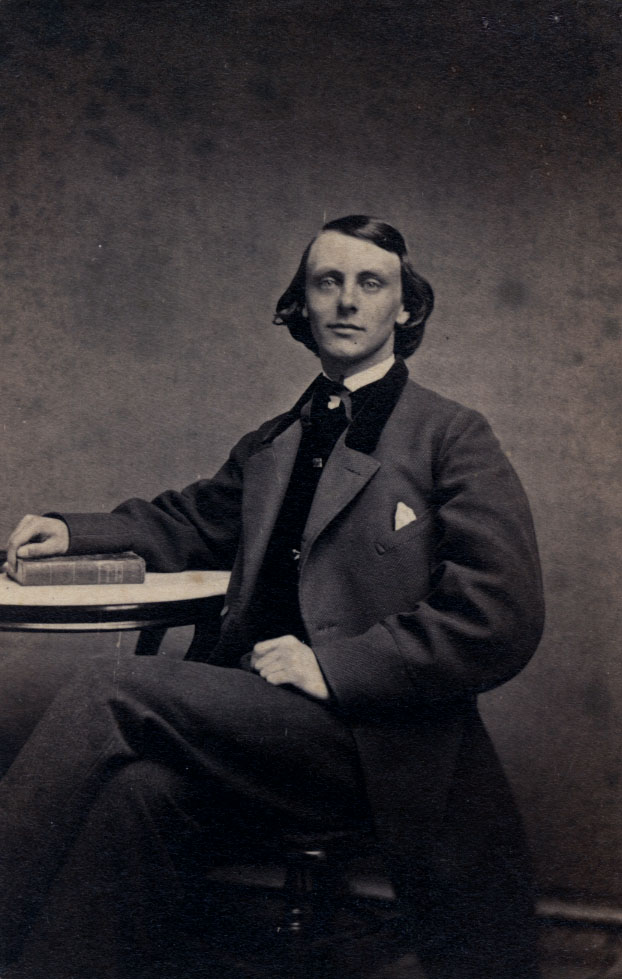
Charles Humphreys Sweetser

Charles Humphreys Sweetser (August 25, 1841 – 1871) was an American author, journalist and editor. He was born in Athol, Massachusetts, in Worcester County and graduated from Amherst College in 1862. The poet Emily Dickinson was one of his cousins and his daughter, Kate Dickinson Sweetser, was also an author. He founded the The Round Table, one of the earliest literary weeklies in American printing, with his cousin Henry Edward Sweetser. He also founded the New York Evening Mail. He died in Palatka, Florida, (then known as Pilatka) at the age of thirty.

== List of works ==
- (1869) Book of the Summer Resorts
- Book of Summer Resorts Explaining where to Find Them, how to Find Them and Their Special Advantages with Details of Time Tables and Prices
