= The Devil's Partner (1923 film) =

1923 film

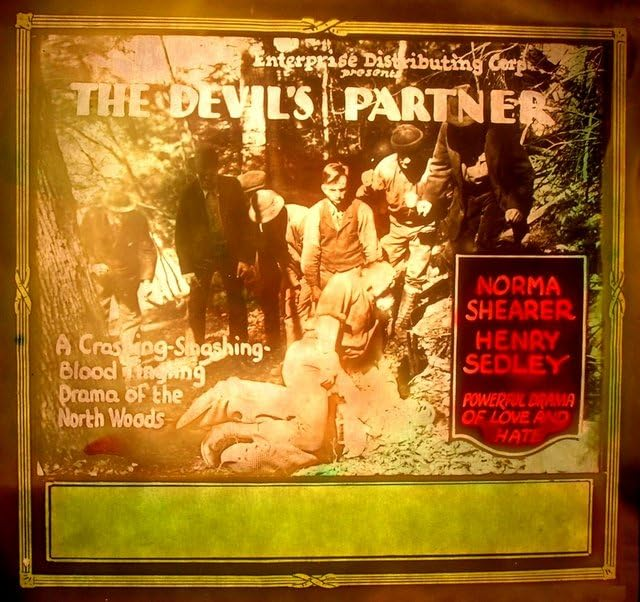
- Lobby card
- Directed by: Caryl S. Fleming
- Production company: Iroquois Productions
- Distributed by: Independent Pictures
- Release date: June 1923
- Country: United States
- Languages: Silent; English intertitles

The Devil's Partner is a 1923 American silent film directed by Caryl S. Fleming and starring Norma Shearer, Charles Delaney and Henry Sedley. A print of The Devil's Partner exists.

== Cast ==
- Norma Shearer as Jeanne
- Charles Delaney as Pierre
- Henry Sedley as Henri, Jeanne's Father
- Edward Roseman as Jules Payette
- Stanley Walpole

== Bibliography ==
- Jack Jacobs & Myron Braum. The films of Norma Shearer. A. S. Barnes, 1976.
