= Henry Sedley (actor) =

American actor (1881–1962)

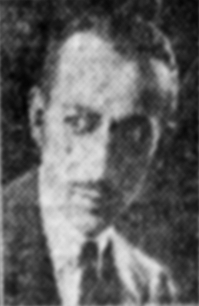
Henry Sedley

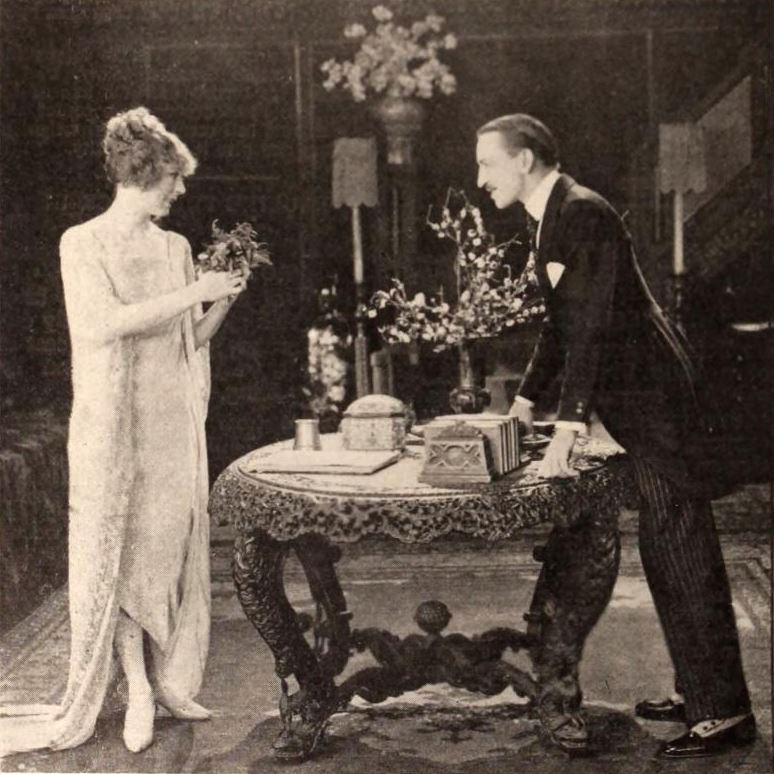
Seena Owen and Henry Sedley in The Woman God Changed (1921)

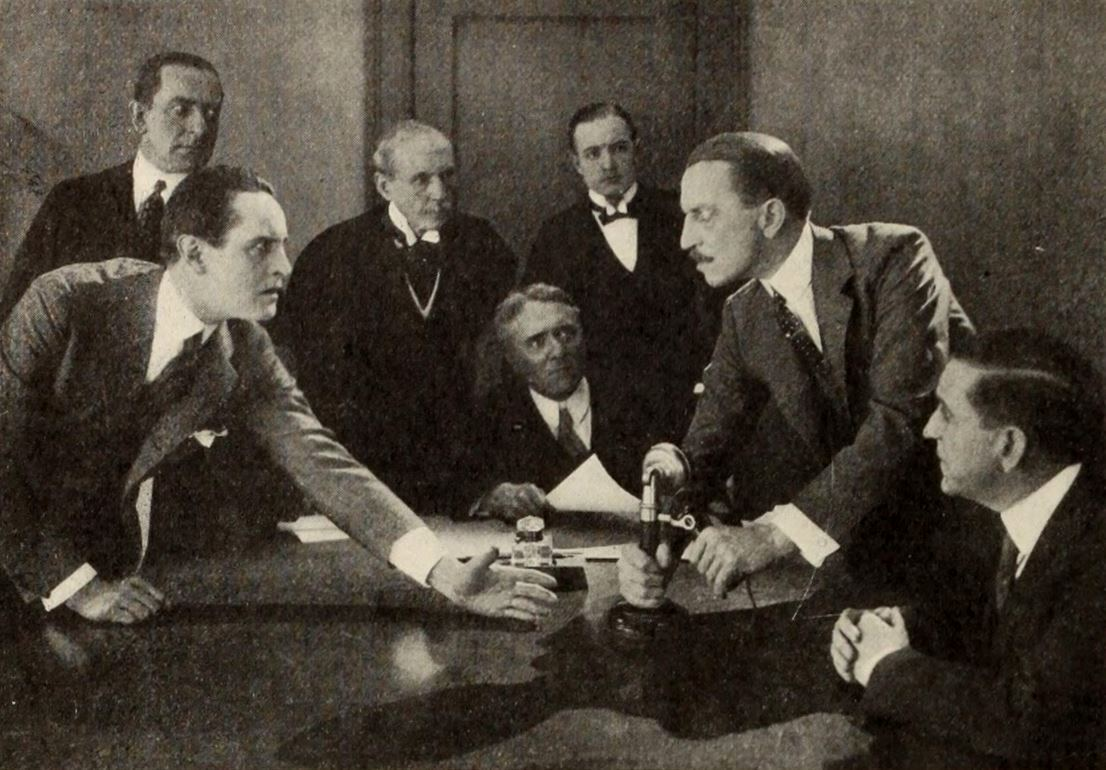
Facing off with Taylor Holmes in Taxi (1919)

Henry McDonald Sedley (1881–1962) was an American actor. He caused the death of a fellow student while a freshman at Yale University in 1901, which may have been the reason for a young woman being banned by her grandmother from marrying him.

Prior to achieving fame in silent film, he owned several racehorses and was a champion jockey. Born in New York in 1881, he attended St. Paul's school, Andover, and the Sheffield Scientific School at Yale University, though he did not complete a degree at Yale. He bought a 70-foot racing yacht from Alfred G. Vanderbilt, and was described as a bon vivant.

When a freshman at Yale in 1901, he caused the death of a classmate, Edward F. Corrigan. He was expelled from Yale in the aftermath. In 1907 he reached a settlement for $300. About the same time, Oliver Barnes, a wealthy friend from Reno, Nevada, took Sedley under his wing and assisted his transition into the film industry. In 1912, he was in the news when a young woman's grandmother forbade her from marrying him.

He was a stage actor for five years prior to transitioning to film in the late 1910s. Early in his film career he was known for playing villains. He was almost six feet tall. Having a slight build, he was not given to portrayals of physical conflict, but in at least one instance (in Straight is the Way, 1921) his fight scene was highlighted in a review. Early in his career he roomed with Adolphe Menjou, and the two shared their possessions and paychecks.

His early film roles included The Daredevil, Thunderbolts of Fate, and The Kaiser's Bride.

== Family ==
His father, also named Henry Sedley, was an engineer and journalist. His mother was Eleanor Phelps McKeague. His younger brother Parke Godwin Sedley was a stockbroker. He had two sisters, Eleanor and Barbara.

== Partial filmography ==
- The Hidden Hand (1917), a serial
- Just for Tonight (1918) as Crandall
- Marriage for Convenience (1919) as Howard Pollard
- Taxi as Duke Beamer
- Voices as Justin Lord
- The Woman God Changed (1921) as Alastair De Vries
- The Silver Lining as Mr. Baxter
- Straight Is the Way as Jonathan Squoggs
- The Last Call (1922)
- Find the Woman (1922)
- John Smith (1922) as Lawyer
- The Exciters (1923)
- The Custard Cup (1923) as Frank Bosley
- The Devil's Partner (1923) as Henri, Jeanne's Father
- The Broken Violin
- For Another Woman (1924)
- The Last Chord (1925)
- The Fool (1925)
- One Hour of Love (1927) as Tom Webb
- Married Alive (1927) as Max Ferbur
- Blonde or Brunette (1927) as Turney
- Million Dollar Mystery as Leo Braine
- Web of Fate (1927) as Linton
- The Racket (1928) as Spike
- His Last Haul (1928) as Blackmailer
- Tropic Madness (1928) as Johnson
- The Bride of the Colorado (1928) as Regan
- The Ghost Talks (1929)
- The Man from Arizona (1932) as Buck Gallagher
- Fighting for Justice (1932) as Bull Barnard
- Cockeyed Cavaliers (1934) as The Baron's friend
