= Emily Dickinson =

American poet (1830–1886)

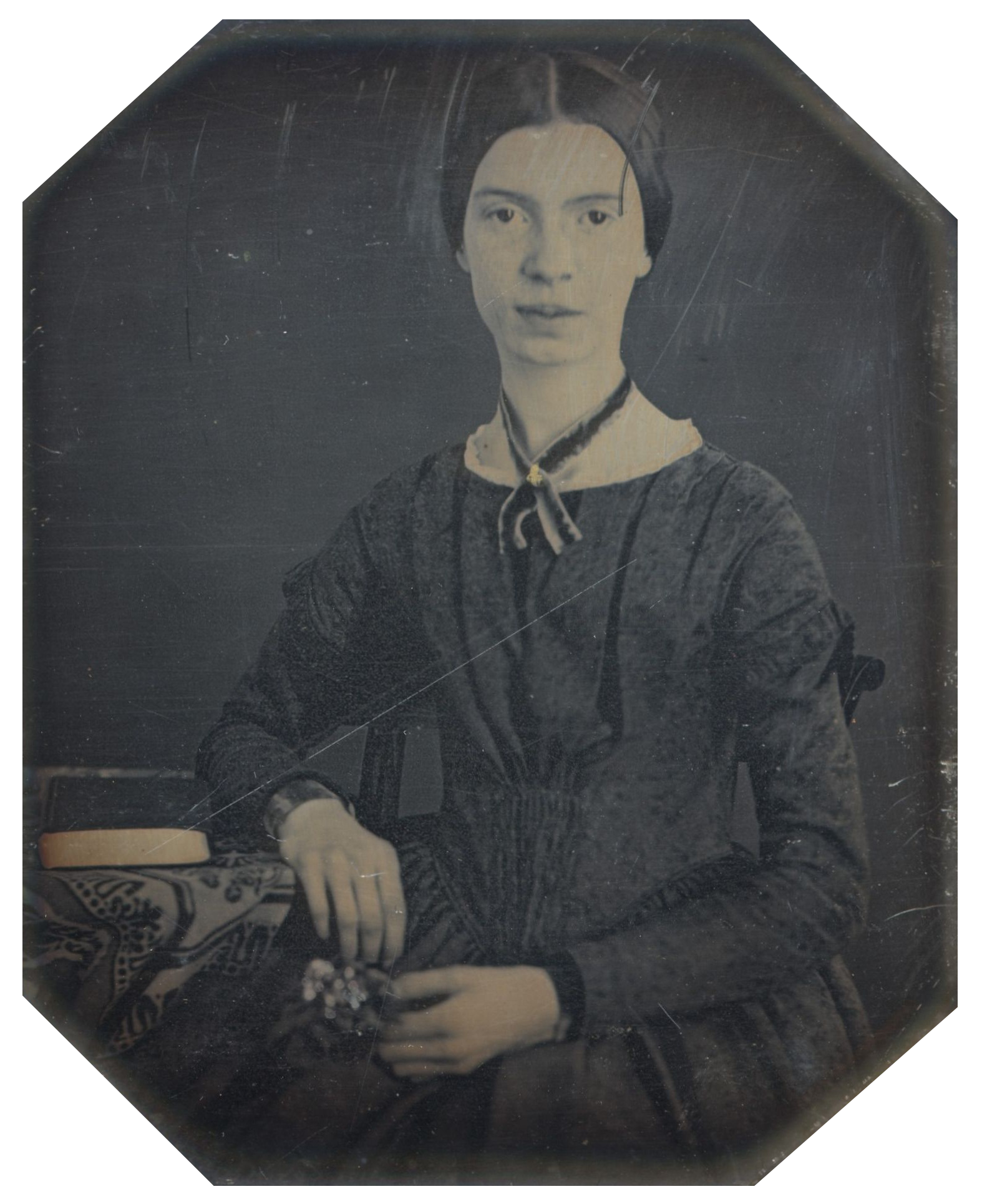
- Daguerreotype taken at Mount Holyoke, December 1846 or early 1847; the only authenticated portrait of Dickinson after early childhood.
- Born: December 10, 1830; Amherst, Massachusetts, U.S.
- Died: May 15, 1886 (aged 55); Amherst, Massachusetts, U.S.
- Resting place: Amherst West Cemetery
- Education: Mount Holyoke Female Seminary
- Occupation: Poet
- Parents: Edward Dickinson; Emily Norcross Dickinson
- Relatives: William Austin Dickinson (brother); Lavinia Norcross Dickinson (sister)
- Writing career
- Notable works: List of poems

Emily Elizabeth Dickinson (December 10, 1830 – May 15, 1886) was an American poet. Largely unpublished and unknown during her lifetime, her work is now widely regarded as canonical. The Poetry Foundation describes her as having "created in her writing a distinctively elliptical language for expressing what was possible but not yet realized."

Dickinson was born in Amherst, Massachusetts, to a prominent family. After studying at the Amherst Academy for seven years, she briefly attended the Mount Holyoke Female Seminary before returning home to Amherst.

Although Dickinson was a prolific writer, only 10 of her nearly 1,800 poems were published during her lifetime. Today her poems are widely regarded as groundbreaking with their use of short acerbic lines, lean descriptions, and slant or off-rhyme. Her poetry primarily deals with nature and mortality.

Few in Dickinson's circle were aware of her writing until after her death, when her younger sister Lavinia discovered the poems in her desk. First published as a selection in 1890, edited by Thomas Wentworth Higginson and Mabel Loomis Todd, the poems were significantly altered to fit the prevailing poetic conventions of the time. Not until 1955, when Thomas H. Johnson compiled a complete collection of her poetry, The Poems of Emily Dickinson, was Dickinson's work restored closer to her original intention. Her collection garnered wide recognition for its innovation.

At least eleven of Dickinson's poems were dedicated to her sister-in-law Susan Huntington Gilbert Dickinson. Some scholars believe censorship helped to obscure the nature of Emily and Susan's relationship, which has been interpreted as romantic.

== Life ==
=== Family and early childhood ===
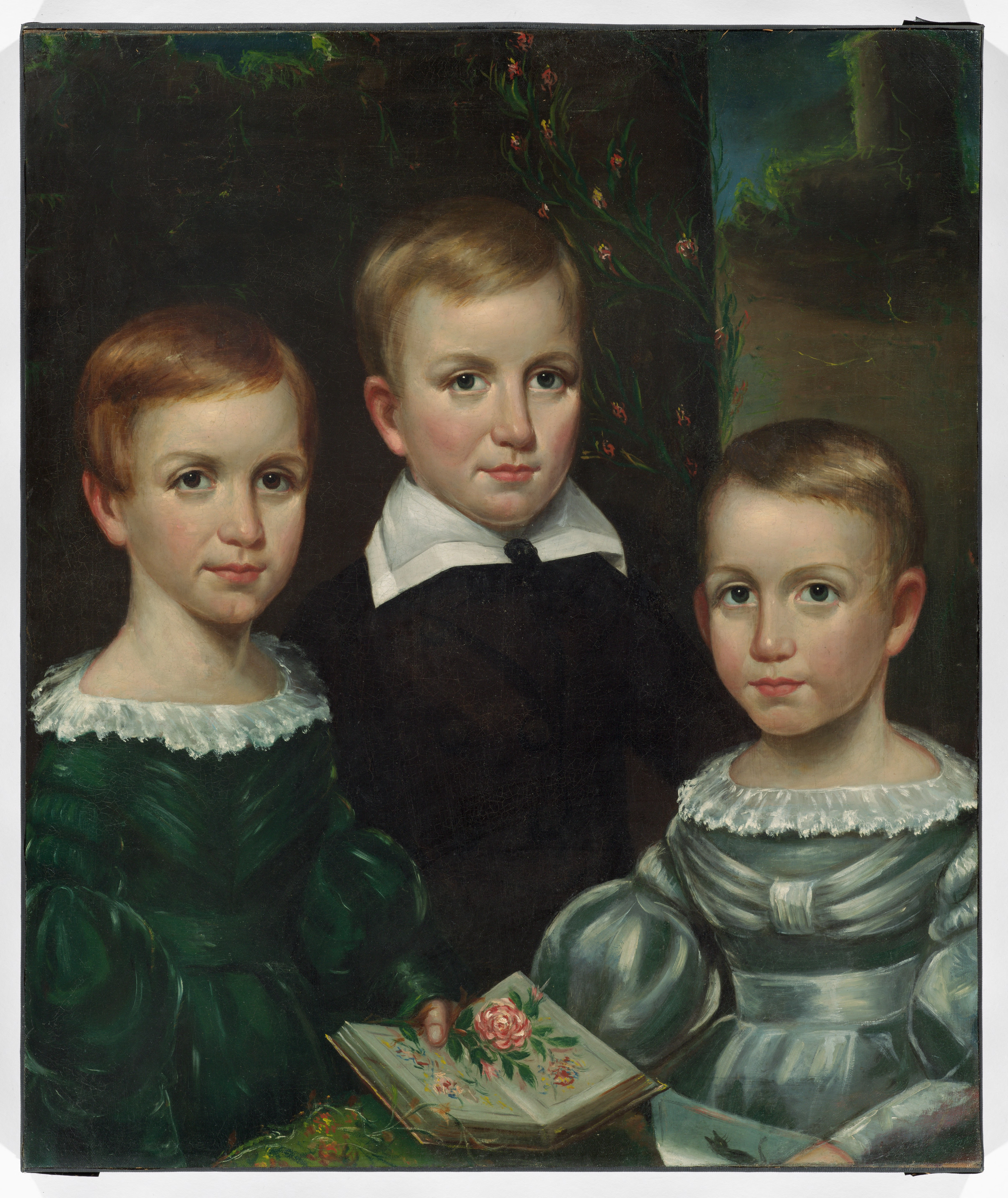
The Dickinson Children, with Emily on the left, c. 1840. From the Dickinson Room at Houghton Library, Harvard University.

Emily Elizabeth Dickinson was born at the family's homestead in Amherst, Massachusetts, on December 10, 1830, into a prominent, but not wealthy, family. Her father, Edward Dickinson, was a lawyer in Amherst and a trustee of Amherst College.

Two hundred years earlier, her patrilineal ancestors had arrived in the New World—in the Puritan Great Migration—where they prospered. Emily Dickinson's paternal grandfather, Samuel Dickinson, was one of the founders of Amherst College. In 1813, he built the Homestead, a large mansion on Amherst's main street, that became the focus of Dickinson family life for the better part of a century.

Samuel Dickinson's eldest son, Edward, was treasurer of Amherst College from 1835 to 1873, served in the Massachusetts House of Representatives (1838–1839; 1873) and the Massachusetts Senate (1842–1843), and represented Massachusetts's 10th congressional district in the 33rd U.S. Congress (1853–1855). On May 6, 1828, he married Emily Norcross from Monson, Massachusetts. They had three children: William Austin (1829–1895), known as Austin, Aust or Awe; Emily Elizabeth; and Lavinia Norcross (1833–1899), known as Lavinia or Vinnie.

She was also a cousin of Charles and Henry Sweetser, sons of her aunt Catherine, and Charles´s daughter Kate D. Sweetser. Dickinson was a distant cousin to Baxter Dickinson and his family, including his grandson, the organist and composer Clarence Dickinson.

On an extended visit to Monson when she was two, Dickinson's Aunt Lavinia described her as "perfectly well and contented—She is a very good child and but little trouble." Dickinson's aunt also noted the girl's affinity for music and her particular talent for the piano, which she called "the moosic".

Dickinson attended primary school in a two-story building on Pleasant Street. Her education was "ambitiously classical for a Victorian girl". Wanting his children to be well-educated, her father followed their progress even while away on business. When Dickinson was seven, he wrote home, reminding his children to "keep school, and learn, so as to tell me, when I come home, how many new things you have learned".

While Dickinson consistently described her father warmly, her correspondence suggests that her mother was regularly cold and aloof. In a letter to a confidante, Dickinson wrote she "always ran Home to Awe [Austin] when a child, if anything befell me. She was an awful Mother, but I liked her better than none."

On September 7, 1840, Dickinson and her sister Lavinia started together at Amherst Academy, a former boys' school that had opened to female students just two years earlier. At about the same time, her father purchased a house on North Pleasant Street. Dickinson's brother Austin later described this large new home as the "mansion" over which he and Dickinson presided as "lord and lady" while their parents were absent. The house overlooked Amherst's burial ground, described by one local minister as treeless and "forbidding".

=== Teenage years ===
They shut me up in Prose –
As when a little Girl
They put me in the Closet –
Because they liked me "still" –

Still! Could themself have peeped –
And seen my Brain – go round –
They might as wise have lodged a Bird
For Treason – in the Pound –

— Emily Dickinson, c. 1862

Dickinson spent seven years at the academy, taking classes in English and classical literature, Latin, botany, geology, history, "mental philosophy," and arithmetic. Daniel Taggart Fiske, the school's principal at the time, later recalled that Dickinson was "very bright" and "an excellent scholar, of exemplary deportment, faithful in all school duties". Although she took a few terms off due to illness—the longest of which was in 1845–1846, when she was enrolled for only eleven weeks—she enjoyed her strenuous studies, writing to a friend that the academy was "a very fine school".

Dickinson was troubled from a young age by the "deepening menace" of death, especially the deaths of those who were close to her. When Sophia Holland, her second cousin and a close friend, grew ill from typhus and died in April 1844, Dickinson was traumatized. Recalling the incident two years later, she wrote that "it seemed to me I should die too if I could not be permitted to watch over her or even look at her face." She became so melancholic that her parents sent her to stay with family in Boston to recover. With her health and spirits restored, she soon returned to Amherst Academy to continue her studies. During this period, she met people who were to become lifelong friends and correspondents, such as Abiah Root, Abby Wood, Jane Humphrey, and Susan Huntington Gilbert, who later married Dickinson's brother Austin.

In 1845, a religious revival took place in Amherst, resulting in 46 confessions of faith among Dickinson's peers. Dickinson wrote to a friend the following year: "I never enjoyed such perfect peace and happiness as the short time in which I felt I had found my Savior." She went on to say it was her "greatest pleasure to commune alone with the great God & to feel that he would listen to my prayers." The experience did not last: Dickinson never made a formal declaration of faith, and attended services regularly for only a few years. After her church-going ended, about 1852, she wrote a poem opening: "Some keep the Sabbath going to Church – I keep it, staying at Home".

During the last year of her stay at the academy, Dickinson became friendly with Leonard Humphrey, its popular new young principal. After finishing her final term at the Academy on August 10, 1847, Dickinson began attending Mary Lyon's Mount Holyoke Female Seminary, which later became Mount Holyoke College, in South Hadley, about ten miles (16 km) from Amherst. She stayed at the seminary for only ten months. Although she liked the girls at Mount Holyoke, Dickinson made no lasting friendships there. The explanations for her brief stay at Mount Holyoke differ considerably: either she was in poor health, her father wanted to have her at home, she rebelled against the evangelical fervor present at the school, she disliked the discipline-minded teachers, or she was simply homesick. Whatever the reasons for leaving Mount Holyoke, her brother Austin appeared on March 25, 1848, to "bring [her] home at all events". Back in Amherst, Dickinson occupied her time with household activities. She took up baking for the family and enjoyed attending local events and activities in the budding college town.

=== Early influences and writing ===
Throughout her early years, Dickinson was influenced mainly by school, church, family, and friends. When she was eighteen her family befriended a young attorney, Benjamin Franklin Newton. Over several weeks, they talked about his love of books, and in 1850 he sent her Ralph Waldo Emerson's poems. Emerson's poems inspired Dickinson with her use of language and that "words had life". Other friends and family also helped influence her, such as Leonard Humphrey who she called her first master before Benjamin Franklin Newton. Both of their deaths shocked her as they were sudden. These deaths impacted her work. Another person in her life that influenced her was Susan Gilbert, her friend and sister-in law, as they shared a library. They both highlighted and underlined passages from books that interested them the most. Henry Vaughan Emmons was another friend with whom she exchanged letters that expanded her interest in reading as well as access to books that would not have been allowed in her home.

During her school years, she was reported to have taken a liking to her teachers, often writing positively about them in her letters to her friends. She discussed books with various students and teachers. They discussed books by Thomas De Quincey, Nathaniel Hawthorne, Thomas Carlyle and Jean Paul Richter. Outside of these discussions, she had a fascination with botany. It delighted her, and she ended up keeping her herbarium by her botany textbook throughout her life. Dickinson's love of flowers and plants is emphasized throughout her letters and poetry. However, due to long periods away from her home and family, Emily recalled school being a lonely and isolated place for her. To Miss A. Strong she wrote: "I was very homesick for a few days, and it seemed to be I could not live here [Mt. Holyoke Seminary]. But I am now contented and quite happy, if I can be happy when absent from my dear home and friends. You may laugh at the idea that I cannot be happy when away from home, but you must remember that I have a very dear home." In Dickinson's poems, isolation is a running theme relating to her feelings of being separated from society within her suffering.

Mrs. Gordon L. Ford recalls groups she had with Emily Dickinson over their school years: "we met to discuss books. The Atlantic Monthly was a youngster then, and our joy over a new poem by Lowell, Longfellow and Whittier, our puzzles over Emerson's [....] We had a Shakespeare Club [...] I remember the lofty air with which Emily Dickinson took her departure, saying, "there's nothing wicked in Shakespeare, and if there is I don't want to know it". Dickinson also encountered many key figures of nineteenth-century literature through the national magazines the Dickinson family subscribed to, engaging with novels by Charles Dickens, the Brontë sisters and George Eliot along with poets such as Robert Browning, Elizabeth Barrett Browning and Tennyson.

Dickinson's family were Calvinists and they practiced daily religious observances. When she was 13, her father gave her a Bible to study. She often used quotes from the Bible in her poems and letters to her friends, as a way to raise unanswerable questions rather than to resolve them. For her, the Bible was a rhetoric manual. In the publication of her letters, Todd recalls: "To her, God was not a far-away and dreary Power to be daily addressed – the great 'Eclipse' of which she wrote - but He was near and familiar and persuasive." Emily's religion was her friendship with others that she held in a high degree, using biblical language in her poetry to refer to friendships. She was also influenced by many writers that she had encountered throughout her early life. In her letter to Higginson, she wrote "For Poets I have Keats, and Mr and Mrs Browning. For prose, Mr Ruskin, Sir Thomas Brown, and the Revelations". Dickinson quoted Keats regularly in her letters to her friends, and she was inspired by his thoughts on aspects like morality and fame. She regularly quoted Shakespeare in her letters to Abiah Root, particularly Macbeth, in the years 1845 and 1850. Her family had books written by the Brontës and she wrote about them in a few letters to her friends; one of her poems is to commemorate the death of Charlotte Brontë.

Dickinson used her writing to experiment and take risks, often not conforming to specific poetry rules. It has been reported that most of Emily Dickinson's poetry was written during the period of the American Civil War. The war, along with the rest of the nineteenth-century world, inspired Dickinson's poetry as she wrote about its battles, chaos, and the courage of the soldiers. Often she reflected on these happenings in comparison to her views on war and death, such as in the poems "When I was small, a Woman died", "My Portion is Defeat- today-", and "My Triumph lasted till the Drums". With the Civil War happening during her time, experiencing the death of her friends and family as well as her close observations of nature and its cycle, Dickinson drew on these as inspiration for her poems and musings.

=== Adulthood and seclusion ===
In early 1850, Dickinson wrote, "Amherst is alive with fun this winter ... Oh, a very great town this is!". Her high spirits soon turned to melancholy after another death. The Amherst Academy principal, Leonard Humphrey, died suddenly of "brain congestion" at age 25. Two years after his death, she revealed to her friend Abiah Root the extent of her sadness:

... some of my friends are gone, and some of my friends are sleeping – sleeping the churchyard sleep – the hour of evening is sad – it was once my study hour – my master has gone to rest, and the open leaf of the book, and the scholar at school alone, make the tears come, and I cannot brush them away; I would not if I could, for they are the only tribute I can pay the departed Humphrey.

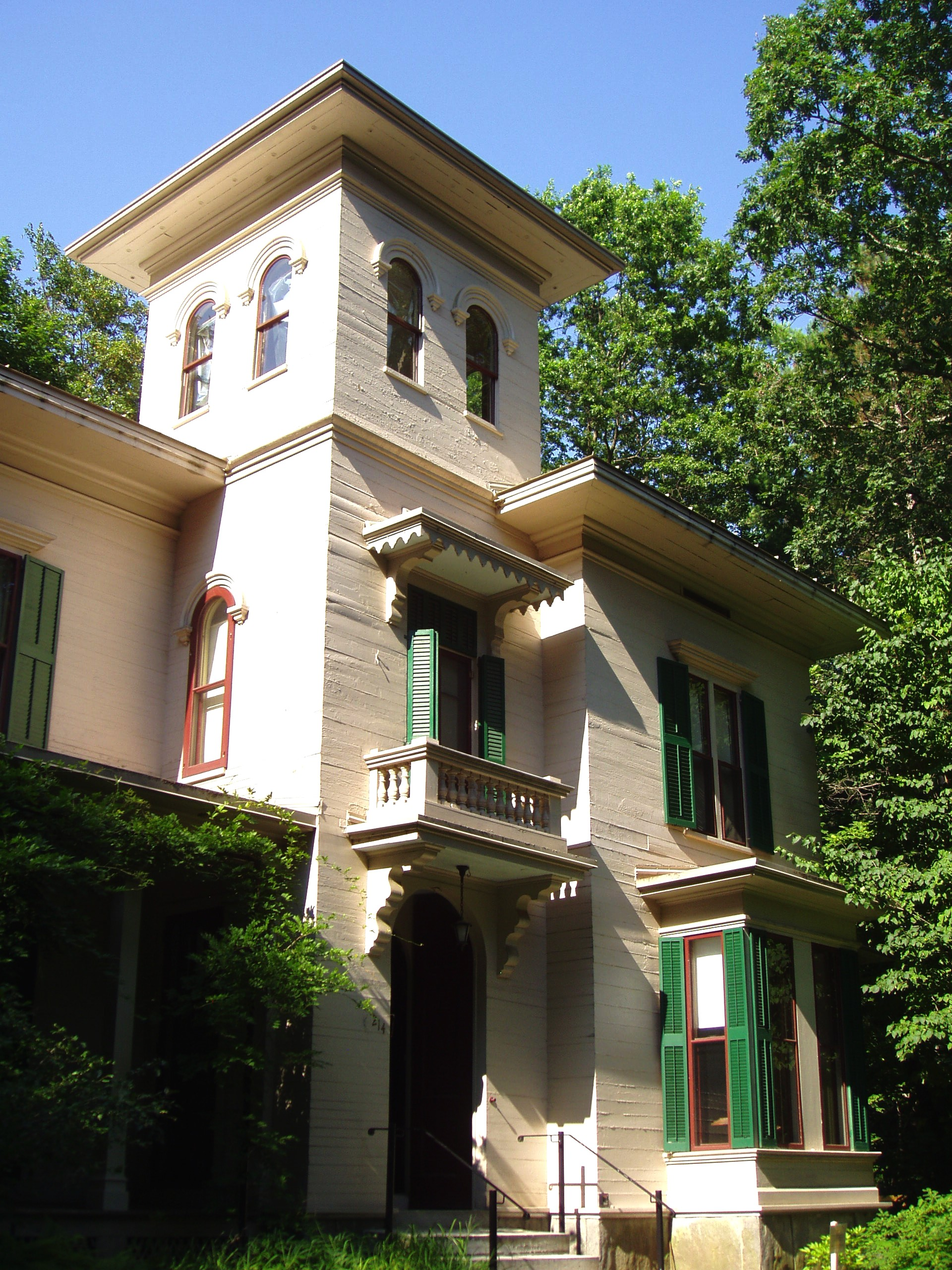
The Evergreens, built by Edward Dickinson, was the home of Austin and Susan's family.

In the 1850s, Dickinson's strongest and most affectionate relationship was with her sister-in-law, Susan Gilbert, who married Dickinson's brother Austin in 1856 after a four-year courtship, though their marriage was not a happy one. Edward Dickinson built a house for Austin which Gilbert named the Evergreens, a stand of which was located on the west side of the Homestead.

Dickinson eventually sent Susan Gilbert over three hundred letters, more than to any other correspondent, over the course of their relationship. Susan was supportive of the poet, playing the role of "most beloved friend, influence, muse, and adviser" whose editorial suggestions Dickinson sometimes followed. In an 1882 letter to Susan, Dickinson said, "With the exception of Shakespeare, you have told me of more knowledge than any one living."

The importance of Dickinson's relationship with Susan Gilbert has been widely overlooked due to a point of view first promoted by Mabel Loomis Todd, who was involved for many years in a relationship with Austin Dickinson and who diminished Gilbert's role in Dickinson's life due to her own poor relationship with Gilbert, her lover's wife.

In 1998, The New York Times reported on a study in which infrared technology revealed that certain poems of Dickinson's had been deliberately censored to exclude the name "Susan". Dickinson's dedications of 11 poems to Susan Gilbert were deliberately censored, presumably by Todd, Gilbert's romantic rival.

The notion of a "cruel" Susan – as promoted by Todd – has been questioned, most especially by Dickinson's nieces and nephews (Susan and Austin's surviving children), with whom Dickinson was close. Many scholars interpret the relationship between Emily and Susan as a romantic one. In The Emily Dickinson Journal Lena Koski wrote, "Dickinson's letters to Gilbert express strong homoerotic feelings." She quotes from many of their letters, including one from 1852 in which Dickinson proclaims,

Susie, will you indeed come home next Saturday, and be my own again, and kiss me as you used to? (...) I hope for you so much and feel so eager for you, feel that I cannot wait, feel that now I must have you—that the expectation once more to see your face again, makes me feel hot and feverish, and my heart beats so fast ( ... ) my darling, so near I seem to you, that I disdain this pen, and wait for a warmer language.

The relationship between Emily and Susan is portrayed in the film Wild Nights with Emily and explored in the TV series Dickinson.

Until 1855, Dickinson had not strayed far from Amherst. That spring, accompanied by her mother and sister, she took one of her longest and farthest trips away from home. First, they spent three weeks in Washington, where her father was representing Massachusetts in Congress, then travelled to Philadelphia for two weeks to visit family. While in Philadelphia, she met Charles Wadsworth, a famous minister of the Arch Street Presbyterian Church, with whom she forged a strong friendship that lasted until he died in 1882. Despite seeing him only twice after 1855 (he moved to San Francisco in 1862), she variously referred to him as "my Philadelphia", "my Clergyman", "my dearest earthly friend" and "my Shepherd from 'Little Girl'hood".

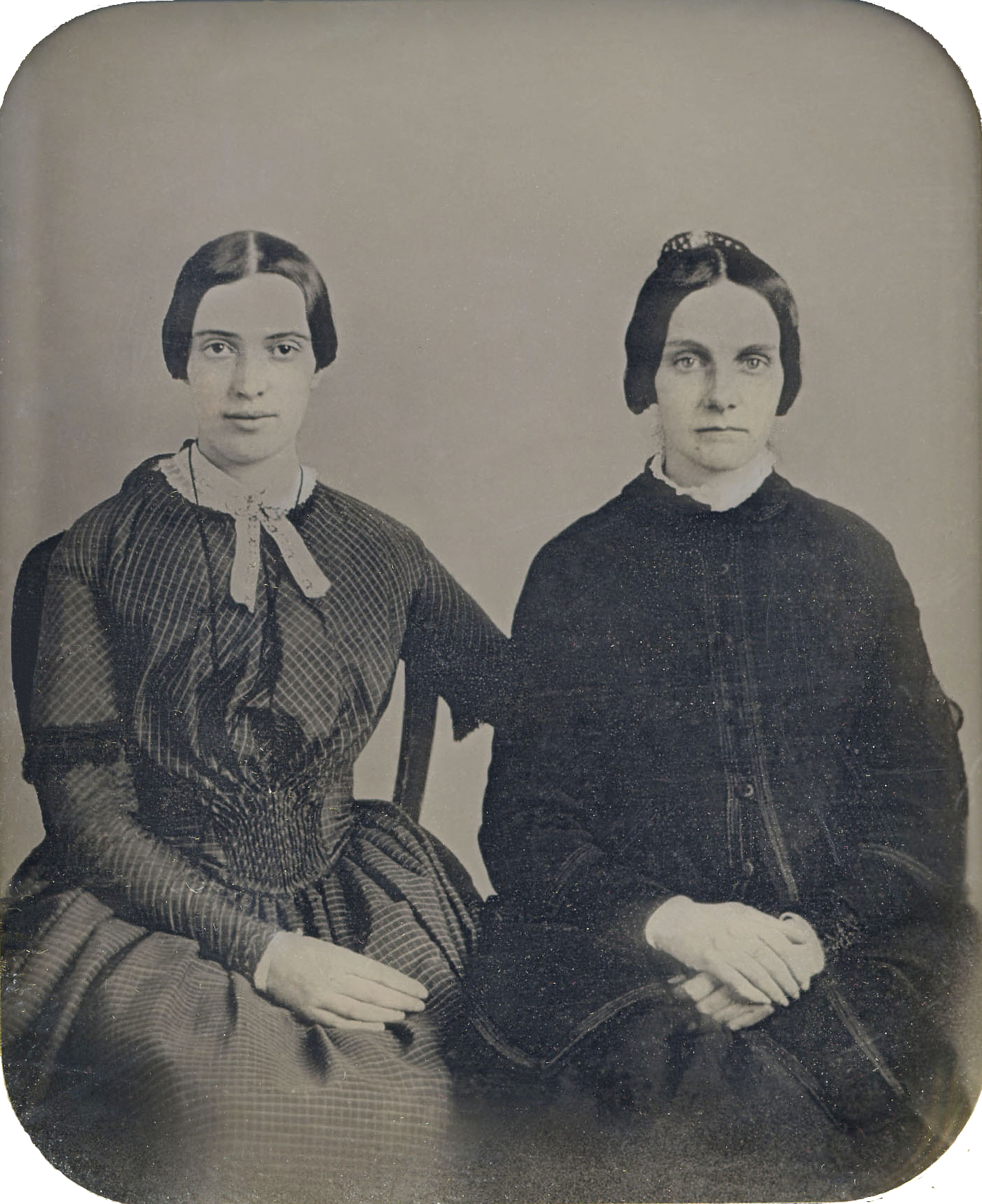
In 2012, the Amherst College Archives and Special Collections unveiled this daguerreotype, proposing it to be Dickinson (left) and her friend Kate Scott Turner, c. 1859. It has not been authenticated.

From the mid-1850s, Dickinson's mother became effectively bedridden with chronic illnesses until she died in 1882. Writing to a friend in the summer of 1858, Dickinson said she would visit if she could leave "home, or mother. I do not go out at all, lest father will come and miss me, or miss some little act, which I might forget, should I run away – Mother is much as usual. I Know not what to hope of her". As her mother continued to decline, Dickinson's domestic responsibilities weighed more heavily upon her and she confined herself within the Homestead. Forty years later, Lavinia said that because their mother was chronically ill, one of the daughters had to remain always with her. Dickinson took this role as her own, and "finding the life with her books and nature so congenial, continued to live it".

Withdrawing more and more from the outside world, Dickinson began in the summer of 1858 what would be her lasting legacy. Reviewing poems she had written previously, she began making clean copies of her work, assembling carefully pieced-together manuscript books. The forty fascicles she created from 1858 to 1865 eventually held nearly eight hundred poems. No one was aware of the existence of these books until after her death.

In the late 1850s, the Dickinsons befriended Samuel Bowles, the owner and editor-in-chief of the Springfield Republican, and his wife Mary. They visited the Dickinsons regularly for years to come. During this time, Dickinson sent him over three dozen letters and nearly fifty poems. Their friendship brought out some of her most intense writing and Bowles published a few of her poems in his journal. It was from 1858 to 1861 that Dickinson is believed to have written a trio of letters that have been called "The Master Letters". These three letters, drafted to an unknown man simply referred to as "Master", continue to be the subject of speculation and contention amongst scholars.

"Hope" is the thing with feathers –
That perches in the soul –
And sings the tune without the words –
And never stops – at all –

And sweetest – in the Gale – is heard –
And sore must be the storm –
That could abash the little Bird
That kept so many warm –

I've heard it in the chillest land –
And on the strangest Sea –
Yet – never – in Extremity,
It asked a crumb – of me.

— Emily Dickinson, c. 1861

Dickinson also became friends with Springfield Republican Assistant Editor J. G. Holland and his wife and frequently corresponded with them. She was a guest at their Springfield home on numerous occasions. Dickinson sent more than ninety letters to the Hollands between 1853 and 1886 in which she shares "the details of life that one would impart to a close family member: the status of the garden, the health and activities of members of the household, references to recently-read books."

Dickinson was a poet "influenced by transcendentalism and dark romanticism," and her work bridged "the gap to Realism." Of the ten poems published in her lifetime, the Springfield Republican published five (all unsigned), with Sam Bowles and Josiah Holland as editors, between 1852 and 1866. Some scholars believe that Bowles promoted her the most; Dickinson wrote letters and sent her poems to both men. Later, as editor of Scribner's Monthly beginning in 1870, Holland told Dickinson's childhood friend Emily Fowler Ford that he had "some poems of [Dickinson's] under consideration for publication [in Scribner's Monthly]—but they really are not suitable—they are too ethereal."

The first half of the 1860s, after she had largely withdrawn from social life, proved to be Dickinson's most productive writing period. Modern scholars and researchers are divided as to the cause for Dickinson's withdrawal and extreme seclusion. While she was diagnosed as having "nervous prostration" by a physician during her lifetime, some today believe she may have suffered from illnesses as various as agoraphobia and epilepsy. Julie Brown, writing in Writers on the Spectrum (2010), argues that Dickinson had Autism Spectrum Disorder (ASD), but this is generally regarded as being more speculation than a retrospective diagnosis, and although the theory has been echoed on the internet especially, it has not been advanced by Dickinson scholars.

=== Is "my Verse ... alive?" ===
In April 1862, Thomas Wentworth Higginson, a literary critic, radical abolitionist, and ex-minister, wrote a lead piece for The Atlantic Monthly titled, "Letter to a Young Contributor". Higginson's essay, in which he urged aspiring writers to "charge your style with life", contained practical advice for those wishing to break into print. Dickinson's decision to contact Higginson suggests that by 1862 she was contemplating publication and that it may have become increasingly difficult to write poetry without an audience. Seeking literary guidance that no one close to her could provide, Dickinson sent him a letter, which read in full:

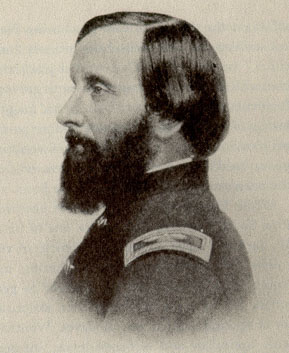
Thomas Wentworth Higginson in uniform. He was colonel of the First South Carolina Volunteers from 1862 to 1864.

Mr Higginson,
Are you too deeply occupied to say if my Verse is alive?
The Mind is so near itself – it cannot see, distinctly – and I have none to ask –
Should you think it breathed – and had you the leisure to tell me, I should feel quick gratitude –
If I make the mistake – that you dared to tell me – would give me sincerer honor – toward you –
I enclose my name – asking you, if you please – Sir – to tell me what is true?
That you will not betray me – it is needless to ask – since Honor is it's own pawn –

This highly nuanced and largely theatrical letter was unsigned, but she had included her name on a card and enclosed it in an envelope, along with four of her poems. He praised her work but suggested that she delay publishing until she had written longer, being unaware she had already appeared in print. She assured him that publishing was as foreign to her "as Firmament to Fin", but also proposed that "If fame belonged to me, I could not escape her". Dickinson delighted in dramatic self-characterization and mystery in her letters to Higginson.

She said of herself, "I am small, like the wren, and my hair is bold, like the chestnut bur, and my eyes like the sherry in the glass that the guest leaves." She stressed her solitary nature, saying her only real companions were the hills, the sundown, and her dog, Carlo. She mentioned that whereas her mother did not "care for Thought", her father bought her books, but begged her "not to read them – because he fears they joggle the Mind".

Dickinson valued his advice, going from calling him "Mr. Higginson" to "Dear friend" as well as signing her letters, "Your Gnome" and "Your Scholar". His interest in her work certainly provided great moral support. Many years later, Dickinson told Higginson that he had saved her life in 1862. They corresponded until her death, but her difficulty in expressing her literary needs and a reluctance to enter into a cooperative exchange left Higginson nonplussed. He did not press her to publish in subsequent correspondence. Dickinson's own ambivalence on the matter militated against the likelihood of publication. Literary critic Edmund Wilson, in his review of Civil War literature, surmised that "with encouragement, she would certainly have published".

=== The woman in white ===
In direct opposition to the immense productivity that she displayed in the early 1860s, Dickinson wrote fewer poems in 1866. Beset with personal loss as well as loss of domestic help, Dickinson may have been too overcome to keep up her previous level of writing. Carlo died during this time after having provided sixteen years of companionship. Dickinson never owned another dog. Although the household servant of nine years, Margaret O'Brien, had married and left the Homestead that same year, it was not until 1869 that the Dickinsons brought in another permanent household servant, Margaret Maher, to replace their former maid-of-all-work. Emily once again was responsible for the kitchen, including cooking and cleaning up, as well as the baking at which she excelled.

A solemn thing – it was – I said –
A Woman – White – to be –
And wear – if God should count me fit –
Her blameless mystery –

— Emily Dickinson, c. 1861

Around this time, Dickinson's behavior began to change. She did not leave the Homestead unless it was absolutely necessary, and as early as 1867, she began to talk to visitors from the other side of a door rather than speaking to them face to face. She acquired local notoriety; she was rarely seen, and when she was, she was usually clothed in white. Dickinson's one surviving article of clothing is a white cotton dress, possibly sewn circa 1878–1882.

Few of the locals who exchanged messages with Dickinson during her last fifteen years ever saw her in person. Austin and his family began to protect Dickinson's privacy, deciding that she was not to be a subject of discussion with outsiders.

Despite her physical seclusion, Dickinson was socially active and expressive through what makes up two-thirds of her surviving notes and letters. When visitors came to either the Homestead or the Evergreens, she would often leave or send over small gifts of poems or flowers. Dickinson also had a good rapport with the children in her life. Mattie Dickinson, the second child of Austin and Susan, later said that "Aunt Emily stood for indulgence." MacGregor (Mac) Jenkins, the son of family friends who later wrote a short article in 1891 called "A Child's Recollection of Emily Dickinson", thought of her as always offering support to the neighborhood children.

When Higginson urged her to come to Boston in 1868 so they could formally meet for the first time, she declined, writing: "Could it please your convenience to come so far as Amherst I should be very glad, but I do not cross my Father's ground to any House or town". It was not until he came to Amherst in 1870 that they met. Later he referred to her, in the most detailed and vivid physical account of her on record, as "a little plain woman with two smooth bands of reddish hair ... in a very plain & exquisitely clean white piqué & a blue net worsted shawl." He also felt that he never was "with any one who drained my nerve power so much. Without touching her, she drew from me. I am glad not to live near her."

=== Posies and poesies ===
Scholar Judith Farr notes that Dickinson, during her lifetime, "was known more widely as a gardener, perhaps, than as a poet". Dickinson studied botany from the age of nine and, along with her sister, tended the garden at Homestead. During her lifetime, she assembled a collection of pressed plants in a sixty-six-page leather-bound herbarium. It contained 424 pressed flower specimens that she collected, classified, and labeled using the Linnaean system. The Homestead garden was well known and admired locally in its time. It has not survived, but efforts to revive it have begun.

Dickinson kept no garden notebooks or plant lists, but a clear impression can be formed from the letters and recollections of friends and family. Her niece, Martha Dickinson Bianchi, remembered "carpets of lily-of-the-valley and pansies, platoons of sweetpeas, hyacinths, enough in May to give all the bees of summer dyspepsia. There were ribbons of peony hedges and drifts of daffodils in season, marigolds to distraction—a butterfly utopia". In particular, Dickinson cultivated scented exotic flowers, writing that she "could inhabit the Spice Isles merely by crossing the dining room to the conservatory, where the plants hang in baskets". Dickinson would often send her friends bunches of flowers with verses attached, but "they valued the posy more than the poetry".

=== Later life ===
On June 16, 1874, while in Boston, Edward Dickinson suffered a stroke and died. When the simple funeral was held in the Homestead's entrance hall, Dickinson stayed in her room with the door cracked open; she didn't attend the memorial service on June 28. She wrote to Higginson that her father's "Heart was pure and terrible and I think no other like it exists." A year later, on June 15, 1875, Dickinson's mother also suffered a stroke, which produced a partial lateral paralysis and impaired memory. Lamenting her mother's increasing physical as well as mental demands, Dickinson wrote that "Home is so far from Home".

Though the great Waters sleep,
That they are still the Deep,
We cannot doubt –
No vacillating God
Ignited this Abode
To put it out –

— Emily Dickinson, c. 1884

Otis Phillips Lord, an elderly judge on the Massachusetts Supreme Judicial Court from Salem, in 1872 or 1873 became an acquaintance of Dickinson's. After the death of Lord's wife in 1877, his friendship with Dickinson probably became a late-life romance, though as their letters were destroyed, this is surmised. Dickinson found a kindred soul in Lord, especially in terms of shared literary interests. The few letters that survived contain multiple quotations of Shakespeare's work, including the plays Othello, Antony and Cleopatra, Hamlet and King Lear. In 1880 he gave her Mary Cowden Clarke's Complete Concordance to Shakespeare (1877).

Dickinson wrote, "While others go to Church, I go to mine, for are you not my Church, and have we not a Hymn that no one knows but us?" She referred to him as "My lovely Salem" and they wrote to each other religiously every Sunday. Dickinson looked forward to this day greatly; a surviving fragment of a letter written by her states that "Tuesday is a deeply depressed Day".

After being critically ill for several years, Judge Lord died in March 1884. Dickinson referred to him as "our latest Lost". Two years before this, on April 1, 1882, Dickinson's "Shepherd from 'Little Girl'hood", Charles Wadsworth, also had died after a long illness.

=== Decline and death ===
Although she continued to write in her last years, Dickinson stopped editing and organizing her poems. She also exacted a promise from her sister Lavinia to burn her papers. Lavinia, who never married, remained at the Homestead until her own death in 1899.

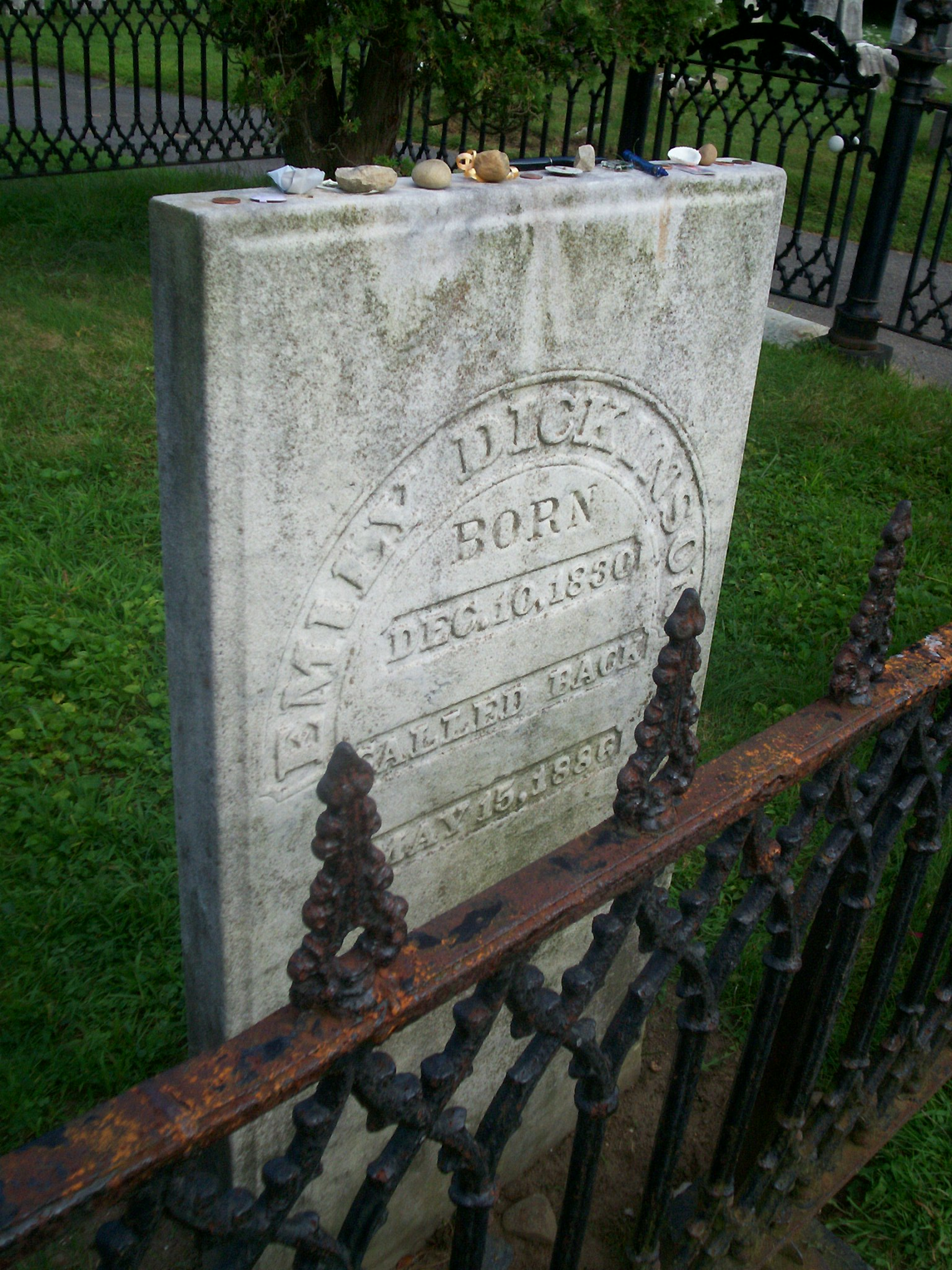
Emily Dickinson's tombstone in the family plot

The 1880s were a difficult time for the remaining Dickinsons. Irreconcilably alienated from his wife, Austin fell in love in 1882 with Mabel Loomis Todd, an Amherst College faculty wife who had recently moved to the area. Todd never met Dickinson but was intrigued by her, referring to her as "a lady whom the people call the Myth". Austin distanced himself from his family as his affair continued and his wife became sick with grief. Dickinson's mother died on November 14, 1882. Five weeks later, Dickinson wrote, "We were never intimate ... while she was our Mother – but Mines in the same Ground meet by tunneling and when she became our Child, the Affection came." The next year, Austin and Susan's third and youngest child, Gilbert—Emily's favorite—died of typhoid fever.

As death succeeded death, Dickinson found her world upended. In late 1884, she wrote, "The Dyings have been too deep for me, and before I could raise my Heart from one, another has come." That summer, she had seen "a great darkness coming" and fainted while baking in the kitchen. She remained unconscious late into the night and weeks of ill health followed. On November 30, 1885, her feebleness and other symptoms were so worrying that Austin canceled a trip to Boston. She was confined to her bed for a few months, but managed to send a final burst of letters in the spring. What is thought to be her last letter was sent to her cousins, Louise and Frances Norcross, and simply read: "Little Cousins, Called Back. Emily". On May 15, 1886, after several days of worsening symptoms, Dickinson died at the age of 55. Austin wrote in his diary that "the day was awful ... she ceased to breathe that terrible breathing just before the [afternoon] whistle sounded for six." Dickinson's chief physician gave the cause of death as Bright's disease and its duration as two and a half years.

Lavinia and Austin asked Susan to wash Dickinson's body upon her death. Susan also wrote Dickinson's obituary for the Springfield Republican, ending it with four lines from one of Dickinson's poems: "Morns like these, we parted; Noons like these, she rose; Fluttering first, then firmer, To her fair repose." Lavinia was perfectly satisfied that Susan should arrange everything, knowing it would be done lovingly. Dickinson was buried, laid in a white coffin with vanilla-scented heliotrope, a lady's slipper orchid, and a "knot of blue field violets" placed about it. The funeral service, held in the Homestead's library, was simple and short; Higginson, who had met her only twice, read "No Coward Soul Is Mine", a poem by Emily Brontë that had been a favorite of Dickinson's. At Dickinson's request, her "coffin [was] not driven but carried through fields of buttercups" for burial in the family plot at West Cemetery on Triangle Street.

== Publication ==
Despite Dickinson's prolific writing, only ten poems and a letter were published during her lifetime. After her younger sister Lavinia discovered the collection of nearly 1,800 poems, Dickinson's first volume was published four years after her death. Until Thomas H. Johnson published Dickinson's Complete Poems in 1955, Dickinson's poems were considerably edited and altered from their manuscript versions. Since 1890 Dickinson has remained continuously in print.

=== Contemporary ===
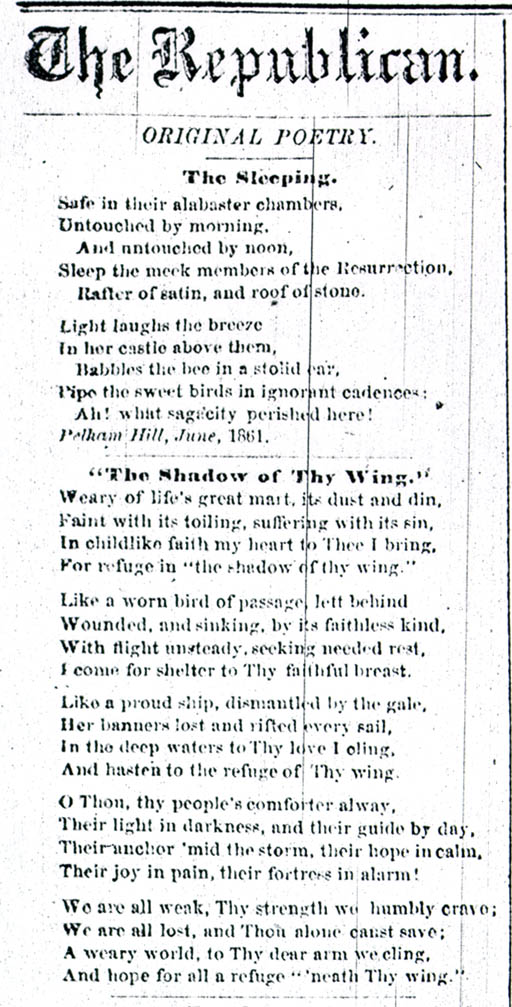
"Safe in their Alabaster Chambers –," titled "The Sleeping", as it was published in the Springfield Republican in 1862.

A few of Dickinson's poems appeared in Samuel Bowles' Springfield Republican between 1858 and 1868. They were published anonymously and heavily edited, with conventionalized punctuation and formal titles. The first poem, "Nobody knows this little rose", may have been published without Dickinson's permission. The Republican also published "A Narrow Fellow in the Grass" as "The Snake", "Safe in their Alabaster Chambers –" as "The Sleeping", and "Blazing in the Gold and quenching in Purple" as "Sunset". The poem "I taste a liquor never brewed –" is an example of the edited versions; the last two lines in the first stanza were completely rewritten.

Original wording
I taste a liquor never brewed –
From Tankards scooped in Pearl –
Not all the Frankfort Berries
Yield such an Alcohol!

Republican version
I taste a liquor never brewed –
From Tankards scooped in Pearl –
Not Frankfort Berries yield the sense
Such a delirious whirl!

In 1864, several poems were altered and published in Drum Beat, to raise funds for medical care for Union soldiers in the war. Another appeared in April 1864 in the Brooklyn Daily Union.

In the 1870s, Higginson showed Dickinson's poems to Helen Hunt Jackson, who had coincidentally been at the academy with Dickinson when they were girls. Jackson was deeply involved in the publishing world, and managed to convince Dickinson to publish her poem "Success is counted sweetest" anonymously in a volume called A Masque of Poets. The poem, however, was altered to agree with contemporary taste. It was the last poem published during Dickinson's lifetime.

=== Posthumous ===
After Dickinson's death, Lavinia Dickinson kept her promise and burned most of the poet's correspondence. Significantly though, Dickinson had left no instructions about the 40 notebooks and loose sheets gathered in a locked chest. Lavinia recognized the poems' worth and became obsessed with seeing them published. She turned first to her brother's wife and then to Mabel Loomis Todd, his lover, for assistance. A feud ensued, with the manuscripts divided between the Todd and Dickinson houses, preventing the complete publication of Dickinson's poetry for more than half a century.

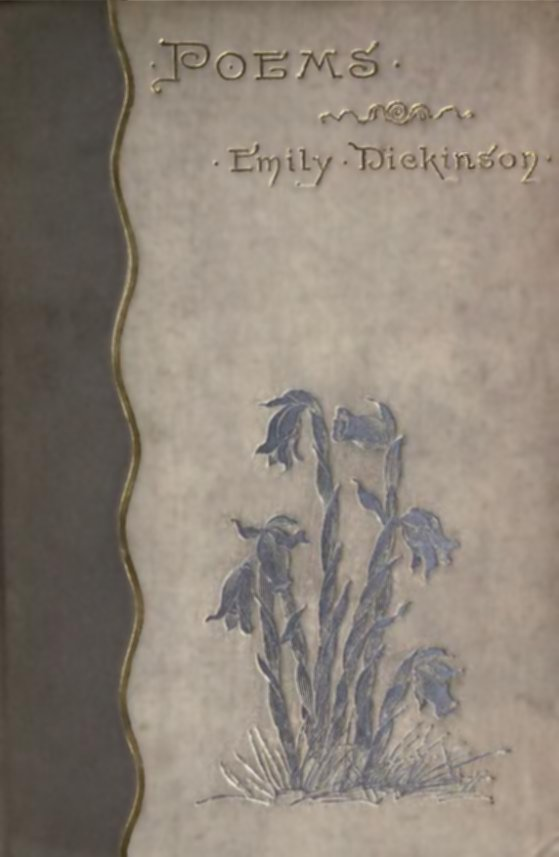
The cover of the first edition of Poems, published in 1890

The first volume of Dickinson's Poems, edited jointly by Mabel Loomis Todd and T. W. Higginson, appeared in November 1890. Although Todd claimed that only essential changes were made, the poems were extensively edited to match punctuation and capitalization to late 19th-century standards, with occasional rewordings to reduce Dickinson's obliquity. The first 115-poem volume was a critical and financial success, going through eleven printings in two years. Poems: Second Series followed in 1891, running to five editions by 1893; a third series appeared in 1896. One reviewer, in 1892, wrote: "The world will not rest satisfied till every scrap of her writings, letters as well as literature, has been published".

Nearly a dozen new editions of Dickinson's poetry, whether containing previously unpublished or newly edited poems, were published between 1914 and 1945. Martha Dickinson Bianchi, the daughter of Susan and Austin Dickinson, published collections of her aunt's poetry based on the manuscripts held by her family, whereas Mabel Loomis Todd's daughter, Millicent Todd Bingham, published collections based on the manuscripts held by her mother. These competing editions of Dickinson's poetry, often differing in order and structure, ensured that the poet's work was in the public's eye.

The first scholarly publication came in 1955 with a completely new three-volume set edited by Thomas H. Johnson. Forming the basis of later Dickinson scholarship, Johnson's variorum brought all of Dickinson's known poems together for the first time. Johnson's goal was to present the poems very nearly as Dickinson had left them in her manuscripts. They were untitled, only numbered in an approximate chronological sequence, strewn with dashes and irregularly capitalized, and often extremely elliptical in their language. Three years later, Johnson edited and published, along with Theodora Ward, a complete collection of Dickinson's letters, also presented in three volumes.

In 1981, The Manuscript Books of Emily Dickinson was published. Using the physical evidence of the original papers, the poems were intended to be published in their original order for the first time. Editor Ralph W. Franklin relied on smudge marks, needle punctures and other clues to reassemble the poet's packets. Since then, many critics have argued for thematic unity in these small collections, believing the ordering of the poems to be more than chronological or convenient.

Dickinson biographer Alfred Habegger wrote in My Wars Are Laid Away in Books: The Life of Emily Dickinson (2001) that "The consequences of the poet's failure to disseminate her work in a faithful and orderly manner are still very much with us".

== Poetry ==
Dickinson's poems generally fall into three distinct periods, the works in each period having certain general characters in common.

- Pre-1861: In the period before 1858, the poems are most often conventional and sentimental in nature. Thomas H. Johnson, who later published The Poems of Emily Dickinson, was able to date only five of Dickinson's poems as written before 1858. Two of these are mock valentines done in an ornate and humorous style, two others are conventional lyrics, one of which is about missing her brother Austin, and the fifth poem, which begins "I have a Bird in spring", conveys her grief over the feared loss of friendship and was sent to her friend Susan Gilbert. In 1858, Dickinson began to collect her poems in the small hand-sewn books she called fascicles.
- 1861–1865: This was her most creative period, and these poems represent her most vigorous and creative work. Her poetic production also increased dramatically during this period. Johnson estimated that she composed 35 poems in 1860, 86 poems in 1861, 366 in 1862, 141 in 1863, and 174 in 1864. It was during this period that Dickinson fully developed her themes concerning nature, life, and mortality.
- Post-1866: Only a third of Dickinson's poems were written in the last twenty years of her life, when her poetic production slowed considerably. During this period, she no longer collected her poems in fascicles.

=== Structure and syntax ===
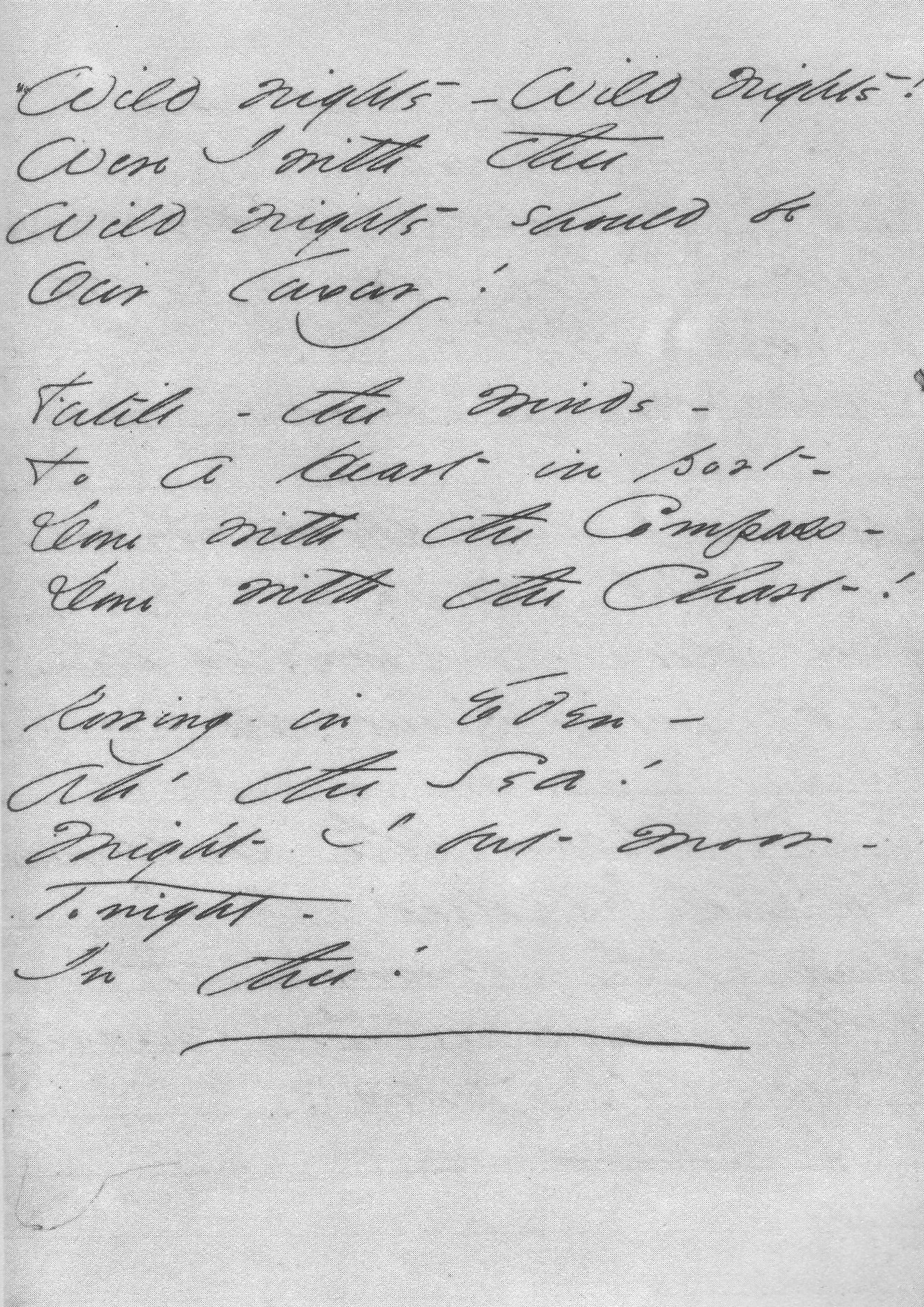
Dickinson's handwritten manuscript of her poem "Wild Nights – Wild Nights!"

The extensive use of dashes and unconventional capitalization in Dickinson's manuscripts, and the idiosyncratic vocabulary and imagery, combine to create a body of work that is "far more various in its styles and forms than is commonly supposed". Dickinson avoids pentameter, opting more generally for trimeter, tetrameter and, less often, dimeter. Sometimes her use of these meters is regular, but oftentimes it is irregular. The regular form that she most often employs is the ballad stanza, a traditional form that is divided into quatrains, using tetrameter for the first and third lines and trimeter for the second and fourth, while rhyming the second and fourth lines (ABCB). Though Dickinson often uses perfect rhymes for lines two and four, she also makes frequent use of slant rhyme. In some of her poems, she varies the meter from the traditional ballad stanza by using trimeter for lines one, two and four; while using tetrameter for only line three.

Since many of her poems were written in traditional ballad stanzas with ABCB rhyme schemes, some of these poems can be sung to fit the melodies of popular folk songs and hymns that also use the common meter, employing alternating lines of iambic tetrameter and iambic trimeter.

Dickinson scholar and poet Anthony Hecht finds resonances in Dickinson's poetry not only with hymns and song forms but also with psalms and riddles, citing the following example: "Who is the East? / The Yellow Man / Who may be Purple if he can / That carries in the Sun. / Who is the West? / The Purple Man / Who may be Yellow if He can / That lets Him out again."

Late 20th-century scholars are "deeply interested" in Dickinson's highly individual use of punctuation and lineation (line lengths and line breaks). Following the publication of one of the few poems that appeared in her lifetime—"A Narrow Fellow in the Grass", published as "The Snake" in The Republican—Dickinson complained that the edited punctuation (an added comma and a full stop substitution for the original dash) altered the meaning of the entire poem.

Original wording
A narrow Fellow in the Grass
Occasionally rides –
You may have met Him – did you not
His notice sudden is –

Republican version
A narrow Fellow in the Grass
Occasionally rides –
You may have met Him – did you not,
His notice sudden is.

As Farr points out, "snakes instantly notice you"; Dickinson's version captures the "breathless immediacy" of the encounter; and The Republican's punctuation renders "her lines more commonplace". With the increasingly close focus on Dickinson's structures and syntax has come a growing appreciation that they are "aesthetically based". Although Johnson's landmark 1955 edition of poems was relatively unaltered from the original, later scholars critiqued it for deviating from the style and layout of Dickinson's manuscripts. Meaningful distinctions, these scholars assert, can be drawn from varying lengths and angles of dash, and differing arrangements of text on the page. Several volumes have attempted to render Dickinson's handwritten dashes using many typographic symbols of varying length and angle. R. W. Franklin's 1998 variorum edition of the poems provided alternate wordings to those chosen by Johnson, in a more limited editorial intervention. Franklin also used typeset dashes of varying length to approximate the manuscripts' dashes more closely.

=== Major themes ===
Dickinson left no formal statement of her aesthetic intentions and, because of the variety of her themes, her work does not fit conveniently into any genre. She has been regarded, alongside Emerson (whose poems Dickinson admired), as a Transcendentalist. However, Farr disagrees with this analysis, saying that Dickinson's "relentlessly measuring mind ... deflates the airy elevation of the Transcendental". Apart from the major themes discussed below, Dickinson's poetry frequently uses humor, puns, irony and satire.

Flowers and gardens: Farr notes that Dickinson's "poems and letters almost wholly concern flowers" and that allusions to gardens often refer to an "imaginative realm ... wherein flowers [are] often emblems for actions and emotions". She associates some flowers, like gentians and anemones, with youth and humility; others with prudence and insight. Her poems were often sent to friends with accompanying letters and nosegays. Farr notes that one of Dickinson's earlier poems, written about 1859, appears to "conflate her poetry itself with the posies": "My nosegays are for Captives – / Dim – long expectant eyes – / Fingers denied the plucking, / Patient till Paradise – / To such, if they sh'd whisper / Of morning and the moor – / They bear no other errand, / And I, no other prayer".

The Master poems: Dickinson left a large number of poems addressed to "Signor", "Sir" and "Master", who is characterized as Dickinson's "lover for all eternity". These confessional poems are often "searing in their self-inquiry" and "harrowing to the reader" and typically take their metaphors from texts and paintings of Dickinson's day. The Dickinson family themselves believed these poems were addressed to actual individuals; scholars frequently reject this view. Farr, for example, contends that the Master is an unattainable composite figure, "human, with specific characteristics, but godlike" and speculates that Master may be a "kind of Christian muse".

Morbidity: Dickinson's poems reflect her "early and lifelong fascination" with illness, dying and death. Her poems allude to death by many methods: "crucifixion, drowning, hanging, suffocation, freezing, premature burial, shooting, stabbing and guillotinage". She reserved her sharpest insights into the "death blow aimed by God" and the "funeral in the brain", often reinforced by images of thirst and starvation. Dickinson scholar Vivian R. Pollak considers these references an autobiographical reflection of Dickinson's "thirsting-starving persona", an outward expression of her needy self-image as small, thin and frail. Dickinson's most psychologically complex poems explore the theme that the loss of hunger for life causes the death of self and place this at "the interface of murder and suicide". Death and morbidity in Dickinson's poetry is also heavily connected to winter themes. Critic Ed Folsom analyzes how "winter for Dickinson is the season that forces reality, that strips all hope of transcendence. It is a season of death and a metaphor for death".

Gospel poems: Throughout her life, Dickinson wrote poems reflecting a preoccupation with the teachings of Jesus Christ and, indeed, many are addressed to him. She stresses the Gospels' contemporary pertinence and recreates them, often with "wit and American colloquial language". Scholar Dorothy Oberhaus finds that the "salient feature uniting Christian poets ... is their reverential attention to the life of Jesus Christ" and contends that Dickinson's deep structures place her in the "poetic tradition of Christian devotion" alongside Hopkins, Eliot and Auden. In a Nativity poem, Dickinson combines lightness and wit to revisit an ancient theme: "The Savior must have been / A docile Gentleman – / To come so far so cold a Day / For little Fellowmen / The Road to Bethlehem / Since He and I were Boys / Was leveled, but for that twould be / A rugged billion Miles –".

The Undiscovered Continent: Academic Suzanne Juhasz considers that Dickinson saw the mind and spirit as tangible visitable places and that for much of her life she lived within them. Often, this intensely private place is referred to as the "undiscovered continent" and the "landscape of the spirit" and embellished with nature imagery. At other times, the imagery is darker and forbidding—castles or prisons, complete with corridors and rooms—to create a dwelling place of "oneself" where one resides with one's other selves. An example that brings together many of these ideas is: "Me from Myself – to banish – / Had I Art – / Impregnable my Fortress / Unto All Heart – / But since myself—assault Me – / How have I peace / Except by subjugating / Consciousness. / And since We're mutual Monarch / How this be / Except by Abdication – / Me – of Me?".

=== Reception ===
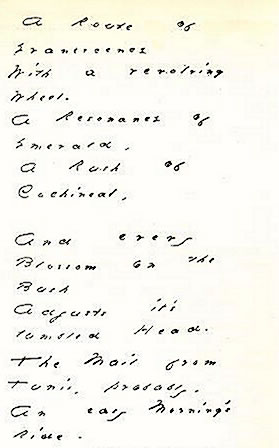
Dickinson wrote and sent this poem ("A Route of Evanescence") to Thomas Higginson in 1880.

The surge of posthumous publication gave Dickinson's poetry its first public exposure. Backed by Higginson and with a favorable notice from William Dean Howells, an editor of Harper's Magazine, the poetry received mixed reviews after it was first published in 1890. Higginson himself stated in his preface to the first edition of Dickinson's published work that the poetry's quality "is that of extraordinary grasp and insight", albeit "without the proper control and chastening" that the experience of publishing during her lifetime might have conferred. His judgment that her opus was "incomplete and unsatisfactory" would be echoed in the essays of the New Critics in the 1930s.

Maurice Thompson, who was literary editor of The Independent for twelve years, noted in 1891 that her poetry had "a strange mixture of rare individuality and originality". Some critics hailed Dickinson's effort but disapproved of her unusual non-traditional style. Andrew Lang, a British writer, dismissed Dickinson's work, stating that "if poetry is to exist at all, it really must have form and grammar, and must rhyme when it professes to rhyme. The wisdom of the ages and the nature of man insist on so much". Thomas Bailey Aldrich, a poet and novelist, equally dismissed Dickinson's poetic technique in The Atlantic Monthly in January 1892: "It is plain that Miss Dickinson possessed an extremely unconventional and grotesque fancy. She was deeply tinged by the mysticism of Blake, and strongly influenced by the mannerism of Emerson ... But the incoherence and formlessness of her—versicles are fatal ... an eccentric, dreamy, half-educated recluse in an out-of-the-way New England village (or anywhere else) cannot with impunity set at defiance the laws of gravitation and grammar".

Critical attention to Dickinson's poetry was meager from 1897 to the early 1920s. By the start of the 20th century, interest in her poetry became broader in scope and some critics began to consider Dickinson as essentially modern. Rather than seeing Dickinson's poetic styling as a result of a lack of knowledge or skill, modern critics believed the irregularities were consciously artistic. In a 1915 essay, Elizabeth Shepley Sergeant called the poet's inspiration "daring" and named her "one of the rarest flowers the sterner New England land ever bore". With the growing popularity of modernist poetry in the 1920s, Dickinson's failure to conform to 19th-century poetic form was no longer surprising nor distasteful to new generations of readers. Dickinson was suddenly referred to by various critics as a great woman poet, and a cult following began to form.

In the 1930s, a number of the New Critics—among them R. P. Blackmur, Allen Tate, Cleanth Brooks and Yvor Winters—appraised the significance of Dickinson's poetry. As critic Roland Hagenbüchle pointed out, their "affirmative and prohibitive tenets turned out to be of special relevance to Dickinson scholarship". Blackmur, in an attempt to focus and clarify the major claims for and against the poet's greatness, wrote in a landmark 1937 critical essay: "... she was a private poet who wrote as indefatigably as some women cook or knit. Her gift for words and the cultural predicament of her time drove her to poetry instead of antimacassars ... She came ... at the right time for one kind of poetry: the poetry of sophisticated, eccentric vision."

The second wave of feminism created greater cultural sympathy for her as a female poet. In the first collection of critical essays on Dickinson from a feminist perspective, she is heralded as the greatest woman poet in the English language. Biographers and theorists of the past tended to separate Dickinson's roles as a woman and a poet. For example, George Whicher wrote in his 1952 book This Was a Poet: A Critical Biography of Emily Dickinson, "Perhaps as a poet [Dickinson] could find the fulfillment she had missed as a woman." Feminist criticism, on the other hand, declares that there is a necessary and powerful conjunction between Dickinson being a woman and a poet. Adrienne Rich theorized in Vesuvius at Home: The Power of Emily Dickinson (1976) that Dickinson's identity as a woman poet brought her power: "[she] chose her seclusion, knowing she was exceptional and knowing what she needed ... She carefully selected her society and controlled the disposal of her time ... neither eccentric nor quaint; she was determined to survive, to use her powers, to practice necessary economics."

Some scholars question the poet's sexuality, theorizing that the numerous letters and poems that were dedicated to Susan Gilbert Dickinson indicate a lesbian romance, and speculating about how this may have influenced her poetry. Critics such as John Cody, Lillian Faderman, Vivian R. Pollak, Paula Bennett, Judith Farr, Ellen Louise Hart, and Martha Nell Smith have argued that Susan was the central erotic relationship in Dickinson's life.

=== Legacy ===
In the early 20th century, Martha Dickinson Bianchi and Millicent Todd Bingham kept the achievement of Emily Dickinson alive. Bianchi promoted Dickinson's poetic achievement. Bianchi inherited The Evergreens as well as the copyright for her aunt's poetry from her parents, publishing works such as Emily Dickinson Face to Face and Letters of Emily Dickinson, which stoked public curiosity about her aunt. Bianchi's books perpetrated legends about her aunt in the context of family tradition, personal recollection and correspondence. In contrast, Millicent Todd Bingham's took a more objective and realistic approach to the poet.

Emily Dickinson is now considered a powerful and persistent figure in American culture. Although much of the early reception concentrated on Dickinson's eccentric and secluded nature, she has become widely acknowledged as an innovative, proto-modernist poet. As early as 1891, William Dean Howells wrote that "If nothing else had come out of our life but this strange poetry, we should feel that in the work of Emily Dickinson, America, or New England rather, had made a distinctive addition to the literature of the world, and could not be left out of any record of it." Critic Harold Bloom has placed her alongside Walt Whitman, Wallace Stevens, Robert Frost, T. S. Eliot, and Hart Crane as a major American poet, and in 1994 listed her among the 26 central writers of Western civilization.

Dickinson is taught in American literature and poetry classes in the United States from middle school to college. Her poetry is frequently anthologized and has been used as text for art songs by composers such as Aaron Copland, Nick Peros, John Adams and Michael Tilson Thomas. Several schools have been established in her name; for example, Emily Dickinson Elementary Schools exist in Bozeman, Montana; Redmond, Washington; and New York City. A few literary journals—including The Emily Dickinson Journal, the official publication of the Emily Dickinson International Society—have been founded to examine her work. The Emily Dickinson International Society was founded in 1988, eight years after an Emily Dickinson Society was formed in Japan in 1980. An 8-cent commemorative stamp in honor of Dickinson, designed by Bernard Fuchs, was issued by the United States Postal Service on August 28, 1971, as the second stamp in the "American Poet" series. Dickinson was inducted into the National Women's Hall of Fame in 1973. A one-woman play titled The Belle of Amherst appeared on Broadway in 1976, winning several awards; it was later adapted for television.

Dickinson's herbarium, which is now held in the Houghton Library at Harvard University, was published in 2006 as Emily Dickinson's Herbarium by Harvard University Press. The original work was compiled by Dickinson during her years at Amherst Academy, and consists of 424 pressed specimens of plants arranged on 66 pages of a bound album. A digital facsimile of the herbarium is available online. The town of Amherst Jones Library's Special Collections department has an Emily Dickinson Collection consisting of approximately seven thousand items, including original manuscript poems and letters, family correspondence, scholarly articles and books, newspaper clippings, theses, plays, photographs and contemporary artwork and prints. The Archives and Special Collections at Amherst College has substantial holdings of Dickinson's manuscripts and letters as well as a lock of Dickinson's hair and the original of the only positively identified image of the poet. In 1965, in recognition of Dickinson's growing stature as a poet, the Homestead was purchased by Amherst College. It opened to the public for tours, and also served as a faculty residence for many years. The Emily Dickinson Museum was created in 2003 when ownership of the Evergreens, which had been occupied by Dickinson family heirs until 1988, was transferred to the college.

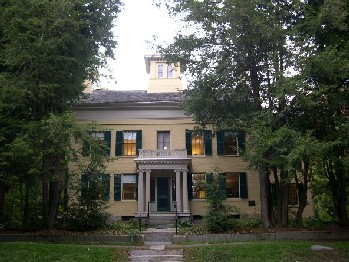
The Dickinson Homestead today, now the Emily Dickinson Museum

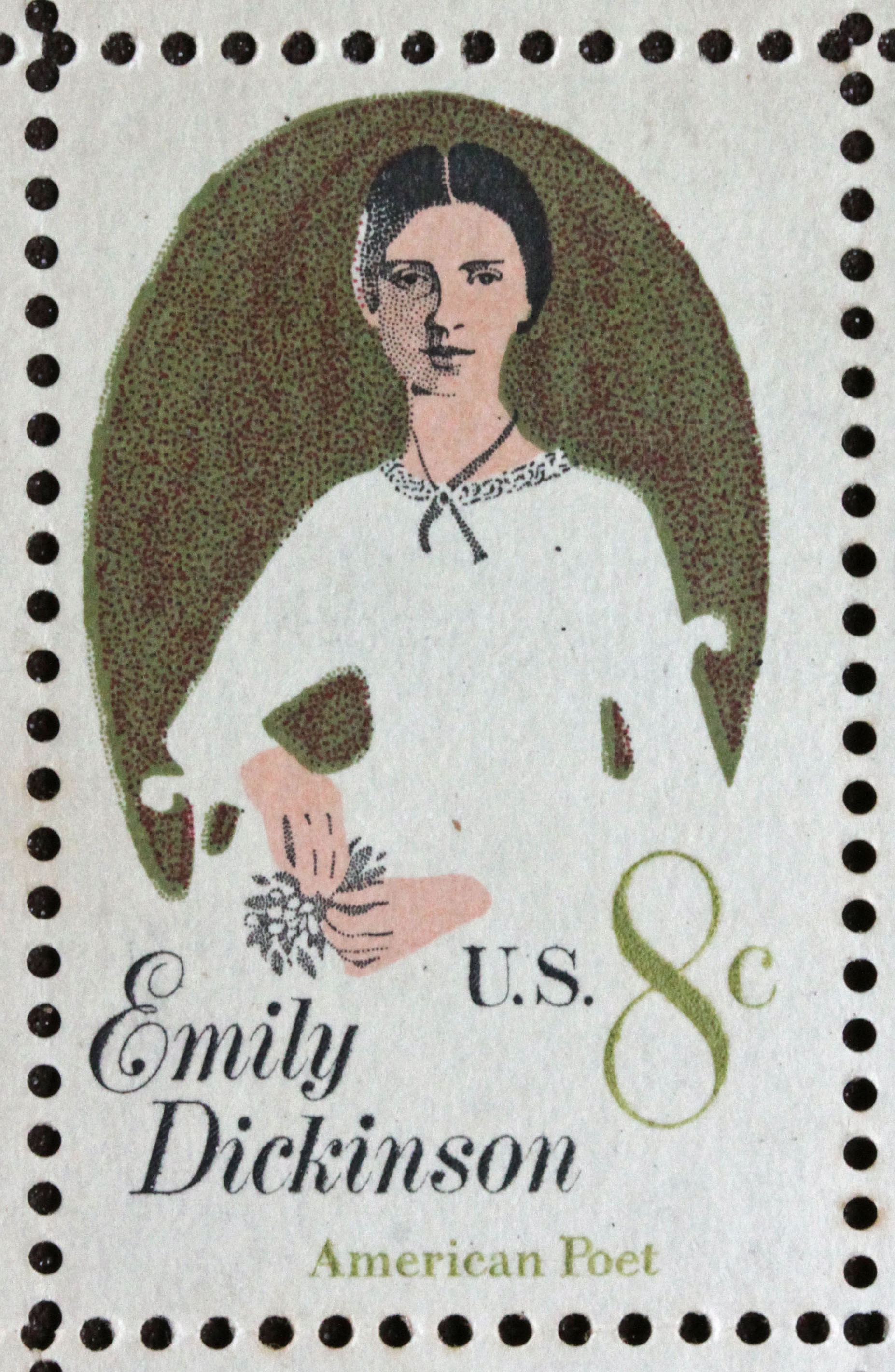
Emily Dickinson commemorative stamp, 1971

== Modern influence and inspiration ==
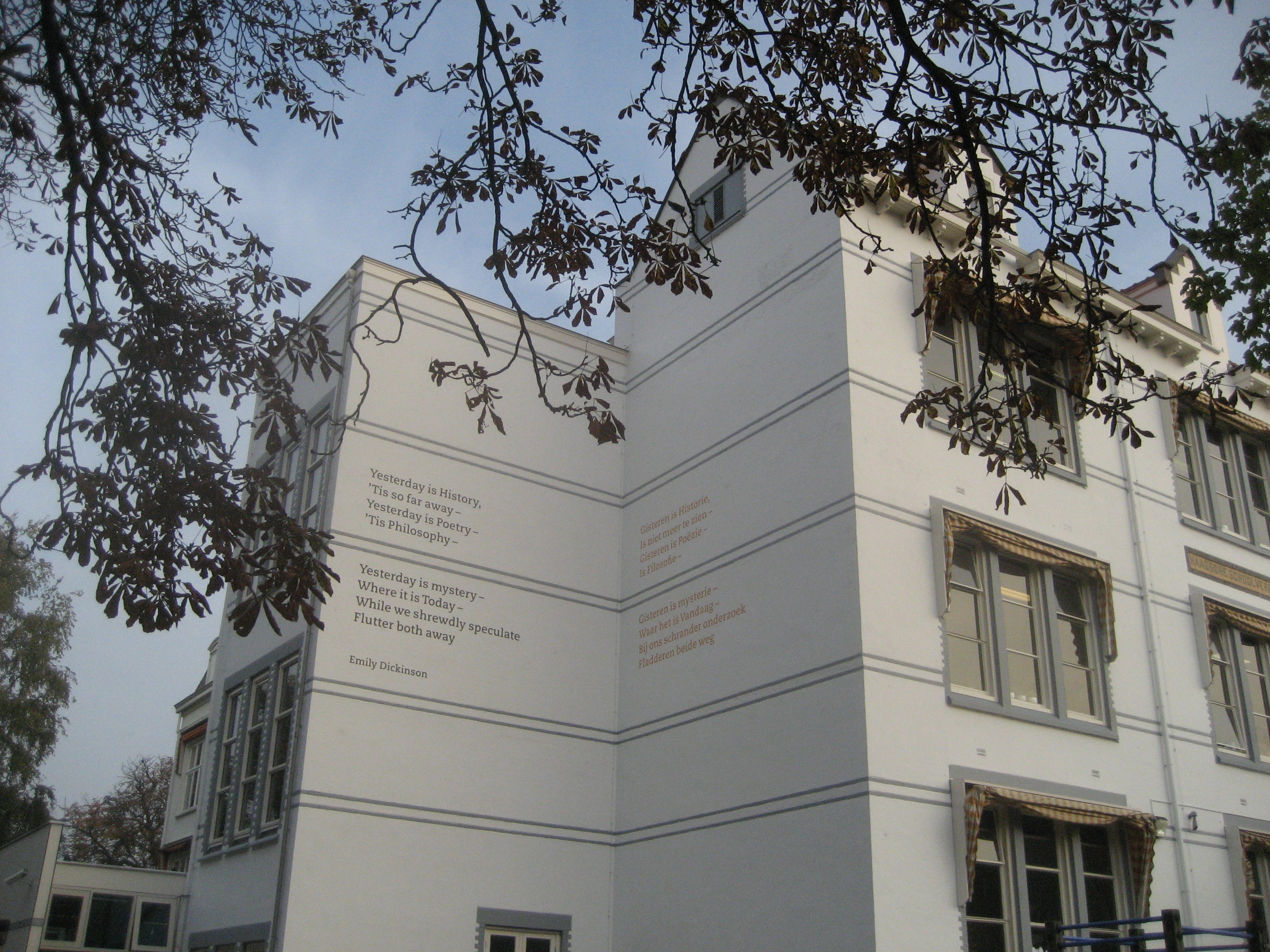
"Yesterday is History" as a wall poem in The Hague (2016)

Emily Dickinson's life and works have been the source of inspiration to artists, particularly to feminist-oriented artists, of a variety of mediums. A few notable examples are:

- The feminist artwork The Dinner Party, by Judy Chicago, first exhibited in 1979, features a place setting for Dickinson.
- In William Styron's 1979 novel Sophie's Choice, and later in the film of the same name directed by Alan J. Pakula, the poems of Emily Dickinson hold an important place. The final line of the book, as well as in the movie, is borrowed from Emily's poem "Ample Make This Bed".
- Jane Campion's film The Piano and its novelization (co-authored by Kate Pullinger) were inspired by the poetry of Emily Dickinson as well as the novels by the Brontë sisters.
- A character who is a literary scholar at a fictional New England college in the comic campus novel by Pamela Hansford Johnson Night and Silence Who Is Here? is intent on proving that Emily Dickinson was a secret dipsomaniac. His obsession costs him his job.
- The 2012 book The Emily Dickinson Reader by Paul Legault is an English-to-English translation of her complete poems published by McSweeney's.
- Dickinson's work has been set by numerous composers including Aaron Copland, Samuel Barber, Chester Biscardi, Elliot Carter, John Adams, John Clement Adams, Libby Larsen, Marjorie Rusche, Peter Seabourne, Michael Tilson Thomas, and Judith Weir. Her composer cousin Clarence Dickinson set his first songs to six of her poems in 1898.
- Square Emily-Dickinson, in the 20th arrondissement of Paris, is named in her honor.
- Jazz saxophonist Jane Ira Bloom released the 2017 double album Wild Lines: Improvising Emily Dickinson inspired by the poet's works.
- Terence Davies directed and wrote A Quiet Passion, a 2016 biographical film about the life of Dickinson. The film stars Cynthia Nixon as the reclusive poet. The film premiered at the 66th Berlin International Film Festival in February 2016 and was released in the United Kingdom on April 7, 2017.
- Wild Nights with Emily, a 2018 American romantic comedy film written and directed by Madeleine Olnek. The film is based on actual events from Dickinson's life.
- Dickinson is a TV series starring Hailee Steinfeld as Emily Dickinson and premiered in 2019 on Apple TV+. The series focused on Dickinson's life.
- American singer-songwriter Taylor Swift, who is a distant cousin of Dickinson, described a category of her lyrics and songwriting, affectionally titled "quill pen songs", that are in part inspired by the likes of Dickinson. She stated, "if my lyrics sound like a letter written by Emily Dickinson's great-grandmother while sewing a lace curtain, that's me writing in the Quill genre. I will give you an example from one of my songs ['Ivy'] I'd categorize as Quill." The aforementioned song, "Ivy", was used in an episode of the Apple TV+ series, Dickinson (see above).

== Translation ==
Emily Dickinson's poetry has been translated into languages including French, Spanish, Mandarin Chinese, Persian, Kurdish, Turkish, Georgian, Swedish, and Russian. A few examples of these translations are the following:

- The Queen of Bashful Violets, a Kurdish translation by Madeh Piryonesi published in 2016.
- French translation by Charlotte Melançon which includes 40 poems.
- Mandarin Chinese translation by Professor Jianxin Zhou
- Swedish translation by Ann Jäderlund.
- Persian translations: Three Persian translations of Emily Dickinson are available from Saeed Saeedpoor, Madeh Piryonesi and Okhovat.
- Turkish translation: Selected Poems, translated by Selahattin Özpalabıyıklar in 2006, is available from Türkiye İş Bankası Kültür Yayınları through its special Hasan Âli Yücel classics series.
- Translation to Polish: Wiersze, translation by Teresa Pelka, public domain, Internet Archive
- Spanish translation: Emily Dickinson : Poemas, a bilingual edition, translated by Margarita Ardanaz
- Slovak translation: Emily Dickinsonová: We Learned the Whole of Love / Učili sme sa celú lásku, a bilingual edition, translated by Milan Richter; Emily Dickinsonová: I Died for Beauty / Pre krásu umrela som, a bilingual edition, translated by Milan Richter

== See also ==
- List of Emily Dickinson poems
