= Henry Sedley (journalist) =

American journalist

Henry Sedley (1831 – January 1899) was a New York businessman and novelist involved in the newspaper industry. He was also known as an engineer. He acquired a portion of the Commercial Advertiser in 1884.

He was credited in the Boston Globe as having exposed the Tweed ring.

His older son, Henry Sedley, earned notoriety when he killed a fellow student at Yale University and later became a successful film actor.

== See also ==
- Round Table (magazine)
