= Emily Dickinson International Society =

International literary society

The Emily Dickinson International Society (EDIS) is an international organisation relating to American poet Emily Dickinson (1830–1886). It was founded in 1988 and its aim is to "Promote, perpetuate and enhance the study and appreciation of Emily Dickinson worldwide".

The society publishes The Emily Dickinson Journal (ISSN 1059-6879) twice yearly and, for members, The Emily Dickinson International Society Bulletin (ISSN 1055-3932). It holds an Annual Meeting and "EDIS Institute" meetings. Every two or three years it holds an International Conference. These have taken place in the USA (1992), Austria (1995), USA (1998), Norway (2001), Hawaii (2004), Japan (2007), England (2010) and the 2014 event is planned for the USA.

The society is affiliated to the American Literature Association (ALA), "a Coalition of Societies Devoted to the Study of American Authors" and is sponsoring two sessions at the 2014 ALA Annual Conference.

An Emily Dickinson Society had been formed in Japan in 1980, eight years before the foundation of EDIS.
