= Kate Dickinson Sweetser =

American writer

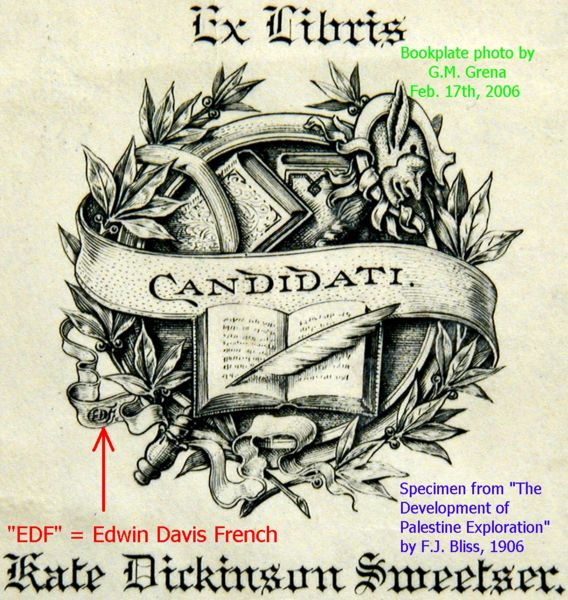
Sweetser's bookplate by Edwin Davis French

Kate Dickinson Sweetser (1870–1939) was an American author known in her time for writing juvenile fiction and compilations. She was born in New York City to Charles H. and Mary N. Sweetser. Her great-grandfather, Samuel Dickinson, was one of the founders of Amherst College in Massachusetts; she was also the cousin of poet Emily Dickinson.

== List of works ==
- Ten Boys from Dickens. New York: R.H. Russell. 1901.
- Ten Girls from Dickens. New York: J.F. Taylor & Company. 1902.
- Micky of the Alley, and Other Youngsters. New York: D. Appleton and Company. 1903.
- Teddy Baird's Luck, and Other Yarns. New York: D. Appleton and Company. 1904.
- Boys and Girls from George Eliot. New York: Duffield & Company. 1906.
- Boys and Girls from Thackeray. New York: Duffield & Company. 1907.
- Ten Boys from History. New York: Duffield & Company. 1910.
- Ten Girls from History. New York: Duffield & Company. 1912.
- Book of Indian Braves. New York, London: Harper & brothers. 1913.
- Ten Great Adventurers. New York and London: Harper & brothers. 1915.
- Ten American Girls from History. New York: Harper. 1917.
- Dining with Dickens at Delmonico's. New York: G.H. Doran Company. 1919.
- Amelia Barr and the Novice. New York: G.H. Doran Company. 1923.
- Peggy's Prize Cruise. New York, NY; Newark, NJ: Barse & Hopkins. 1925.
- Famous Girls of the White House. New York: Thomas Y. Crowell Company. 1930.
- Great American Girls. New York: Dodd, Mead & Company. 1931.
