= Switzer =

Switzer may refer to:

== Places ==
- Switzer, Kentucky
- Switzer, South Carolina
- Switzer, West Virginia
- Switzers, New Zealand, the former name of the town of Waikaia, New Zealand
- Switzer Canyon, San Diego, California
- Barry Switzer Center, University of Oklahoma
- Mary Switzer Building, Washington D.C.
- Nicholas Switzer House

== Other uses ==
- A person from Switzerland
  - Specifically, one of the Swiss mercenaries
- Switzer (surname)
- Switzer Unlimited, Canadian talk show television series
- Skinner v. Switzer, a legal dispute that was decided by the U.S. Supreme Court
- Switzer's Asylum, homes for the elderly

== See also ==
- William A. Switzer Provincial Park, Alberta, Canada
- Schweitzer, a surname
- Schweizer (disambiguation)
- Swiss (disambiguation)
