= A Quiet Passion =

- UK theatrical release poster
- Directed by: Terence Davies
- Written by: Terence Davies
- Produced by: Roy Boulter; Sol Papadopoulos
- Starring: Cynthia Nixon; Jennifer Ehle; Keith Carradine
- Cinematography: Florian Hoffmeister
- Edited by: Pia Di Ciaula
- Production companies: Hurricane Films; Gibson & MacLeod Indomitable Entertainment; WeatherVane Productions; Potemkino
- Distributed by: Soda Pictures
- Release dates: 14 February 2016 (Berlin); 7 April 2017 (United Kingdom)
- Running time: 125 minutes
- Country: United Kingdom
- Language: English
- Budget: $7.3 million
- Box office: $4.1 million

A Quiet Passion is a 2016 British biographical film written and directed by Terence Davies about the life of American poet Emily Dickinson. The film stars Cynthia Nixon as the reclusive poet. It co-stars Emma Bell as young Dickinson, Jennifer Ehle, Duncan Duff, and Keith Carradine. The film premiered at the 66th Berlin International Film Festival in February 2016 and was released in the United Kingdom on 7 April 2017. It won the Grand Prix at Film Fest Gent in 2016, and was voted the best film of 2017 by the Museum of the Moving Image publication Reverse Shot.

== Plot ==
The film follows American poet Emily Dickinson from her early years as a student to her later years. Emily's upbringing in Massachusetts' Puritan/Congregational world is evident from the start, when she stands up to a Mount Holyoke Female Seminary school mistress (Miss Mary Lyon). Her family including Father, brother Austin, and sister Vinnie take her home to Amherst. Subsequently, while she is enraptured at the opera, her father and aunt express displeasure at a woman singing anything other than hymns – a pious Aunt Elizabeth comes to regard Emily as insolent.

Emily convinces her father to ask his friend Dr Holland, editor of the Springfield Republican, to publish her poems. The editor deigns to publish one, noting that the rest are childish and that women cannot add much to literature.

Many years pass and we see the Dickinson family as older adults. Family friend Vryling Buffam strikes up a friendship with a retiring Emily, who admires Vryling's acerbic commentary. Emily begins to assert her independence by not attending church, angering Father. Austin brings home his new bride, Susan, and the Dickinson sisters welcome her warmly, as does an evidently unwell Mrs Dickinson who makes a rare appearance downstairs. (Susan will later confide in Emily that she had strong reservations about marriage, not feeling the usual attraction.)

When the American Civil War starts, Father decides that he will pay for Austin to avoid the draft, Austin's heartfelt views on honor and conscience notwithstanding. There is a montage of civil war battles. Austin is offended by Emily's observation that gender issues ought to be considered in a similar light to slavery.

Emily experiences a series of losses, which drive her reclusive nature. She develops an attachment to a married pastor, and is visibly angry on hearing he is moving away. Vryling is to marry; Emily refuses to attend and bids her "goodbye". Emily views marriage as cutting ties with family to live with strangers. Father dies – we see Emily grieving her father from an upstairs window refusing to join the funeral procession.

Emily, now confined to her room, will not come downstairs. She upbraids the visiting newspaper editor for altering the punctuation of her poems, objecting to Dr Holland's changes as "obviousness". She refuses to come down meet a potential suitor who admires her poetry – fearing he is too beautiful. Later she prays for a suitor and has a mystical vision. Emily explains to Vinnie that for her love is permanent, unlike a man who loves and then cools.

Diagnosed with Bright's disease, a kidney ailment, her health deteriorates with back pain and grand mal seizures. Mother, long suffering from melancholy, has a stroke and passes. Subsequently, Emily discovers that Austin is having an affair with a singer (Mrs Todd). Emily, with sympathy for Susan, confronts her brother's hypocrisy. With the strains growing, Vinnie points out to Emily her own intolerance of the failings of others.

Emily's condition deteriorates. She dies with Austin and Vinnie visibly distraught by her side.

== Cast ==
- Cynthia Nixon as Emily Dickinson
  - Emma Bell as Young Emily Dickinson
- Jennifer Ehle as Lavinia "Vinnie" Dickinson, Emily's sister
  - Rose Williams as Young Vinnie Dickinson
- Duncan Duff as Austin Dickinson, Emily's brother
  - Benjamin Wainwright as Young Austin Dickinson
- Joanna Bacon as Emily Norcross Dickinson, Emily's mother
- Keith Carradine as Edward Dickinson, Emily's father
- Jodhi May as Susan Gilbert Dickinson, Emily's sister-in-law
- Daan and Eve Cools as Edward Dickinson, son of Austin and Susan, Emily's nephew
- Yasmin Dewilde as Margaret "Maggie" Maher, Emily's maid
- Verona Verbakel as Margaret Kelley, Maggie's niece and Susan and Austin's maid
- Turlough Convery as Thomas Kelley, father of Mary Kelley and brother-in-law of Margaret "Maggie" Maher
- Annette Badland as Elizabeth Dickinson Currier, Emily's aunt
- Noemie Schellens as Mabel Loomis Todd
- Marieke Bresseleers as Jenny Lind
- Catherine Bailey as Vryling Wilder Buffum, a friend of Vinnie's
- Eric Loren as Reverend Charles Wadsworth
- Simone Milsdochter as Jane Locke Wadsworth, Charles's wife
- Stefan Menaul as Mr. Henry Emmons
- Trevor Cooper as Samuel Bowles
- Sara Vertongen as Mary Lyon, headmistress of Mount Holyoke Female Seminary, where Emily studied.
- Barney Glover as Dancing Soldier
- Richard Wells as Doctor
- Miles Richardson as Pastor
- Maurice Cassiers as The Photographer

== Production ==
On 10 September 2012, it was announced that Cynthia Nixon was set to play Emily Dickinson in a biopic directed by Terence Davies. In May 2015, after a long time in development hell, A Quiet Passion finally began production in Belgium. The film was shot at AED Studios in a replica of Dickinson's house. Additional scenes were also filmed in Amherst and Pelham, Massachusetts. Jennifer Ehle was cast in a key supporting role opposite Nixon.

== Reception ==
On review aggregator website Rotten Tomatoes, the film holds an approval rating of 91%, based on 152 reviews, and an average rating of 7.8/10. The website's critical consensus reads, "A Quiet Passion offers a finely detailed portrait of a life whose placid passage may not have been inherently cinematic, but is made more affecting by Cynthia Nixon's strong performance." On Metacritic, the film has a weighted average score of 78 out of 100, based on 31 critics, indicating "generally favorable reviews".

The film was highly praised by the British newspapers The Guardian and The Independent, whose review headline called it a "masterpiece of mood". Richard Brody of The New Yorker called it a "masterwork" and stated that the film would "take its place as one of [Davies's] finest creations". Had the film been given a limited release in the United States before 2017, Brody would have placed it first in his list of best films of 2016. Internationally, The New York Times stated in its review: "Mr. Davies ... possesses a poetic sensibility perfectly suited to its subject and a deep, idiosyncratic intuition about what might have made her tick." The Washington Post wrote: "Davies is a master of the slow build, lyrically evoking both the dreaminess and gravity of his subject and her verse".
