= Wild Nights – Wild Nights! =

Poem by Emily Dickinson

- by Emily Dickinson
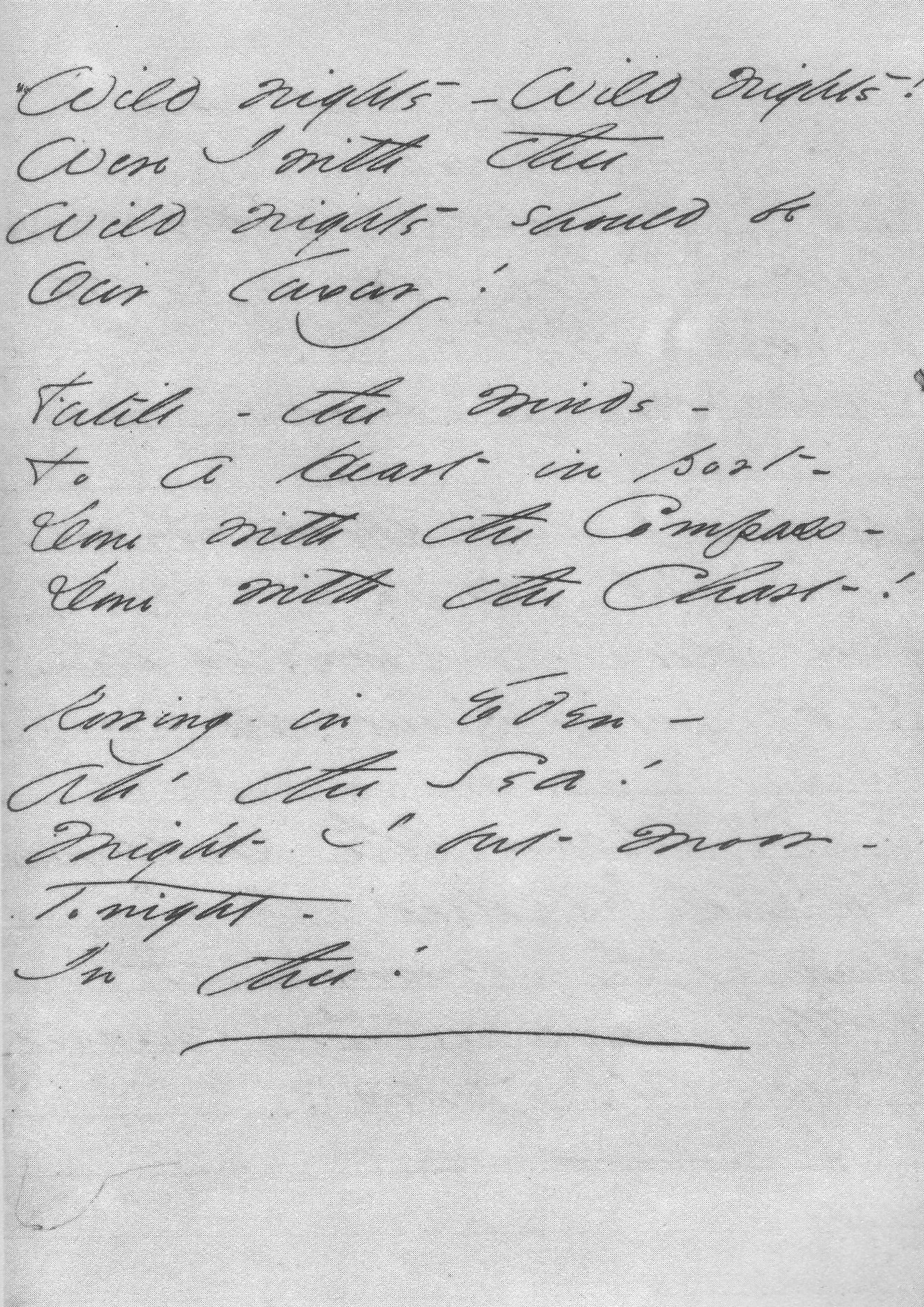
- Autograph manuscript of the poem
- First published in: Poems, Second Series
- Country: United States
- Language: English
- Publisher: Roberts Brothers
- Publication date: 1891
- Lines: 12
- Metre: Dimeter

Full text
- Wild Nights — Wild Nights! at Wikisource

"Wild Nights – Wild Nights!" is an 1861 poem by Emily Dickinson. It was included in her posthumous collection of Poems, Second Series, published November 9, 1891.

== Text of the poem ==
Close transcription

Wild nights — Wild nights!
Were I with thee
Wild nights should be
Our luxury!

Futile — the winds —
To a Heart in port —
Done with the Compass —
Done with the Chart!

Rowing in Eden —
Ah — the Sea!
Might I but moor —
tonight —
In thee!

== Analysis ==
Dickinson's posthumous editor Thomas Wentworth Higginson thought the poem was too erotic for a woman he deemed pure and was initially reluctant to print the poem, "lest the malignant read into it more than that virgin recluse ever dream of putting there". Modern readers now, however, recognize the poem as one of her most erotic and find in the text Dickinson's understanding of sexual passion.

The poem is structurally unusual for Dickinson, using lines with only two metric feet instead of her typical three and four feet iambs. Judith Farr writes that the opening spondees makes the poem theatrical, turbulent, and stormy, appropriate for the subject matter, and shows her interest in the Brontë sisters and Wuthering Heights. She also notes that "Wild Nights" is perhaps the most "Dickinsonian" of her poems in that it is "ironic, paradoxical, voluptuous, and terse all at once."

For the Poetry Society of America's Reading Through the Decades series, Sarah Arvio writes of the poem:

She seems to want those wild winds, but she also wants to moor in 'thee.' Isn't this love? Human love: the lovely wildness one can feel while moored in the beloved. But she also says that winds cannot touch the Heart that is in port. This odd paradox leaves me at sea, as so often when reading Emily.

== In popular culture ==
It is set in Harmonium by John Adams (1981).

Wild Nights!, a 2008 short story collection by Joyce Carol Oates, is named after the poem, which also serves as its epigraph. The collection features stories about the last days of the lives of Dickinson, Edgar Allan Poe, Mark Twain, Henry James, and Ernest Hemingway.

The poem is the origin of the title Wild Nights with Emily, a 2018 biopic of Dickinson starring Molly Shannon.

Actress Najarra Townsend recites the poem in its entirety in the 2017 film Mercury in Retrograde.

In the 2019 TV show Dickinson the poem serves as the title of its third episode and is read by Austin Dickinson while looking for evidence that Emily and Sue love each other.
