= Dickinson Historic District =

Historic district in Massachusetts, United States

- U.S. National Register of Historic Places
- U.S. Historic district
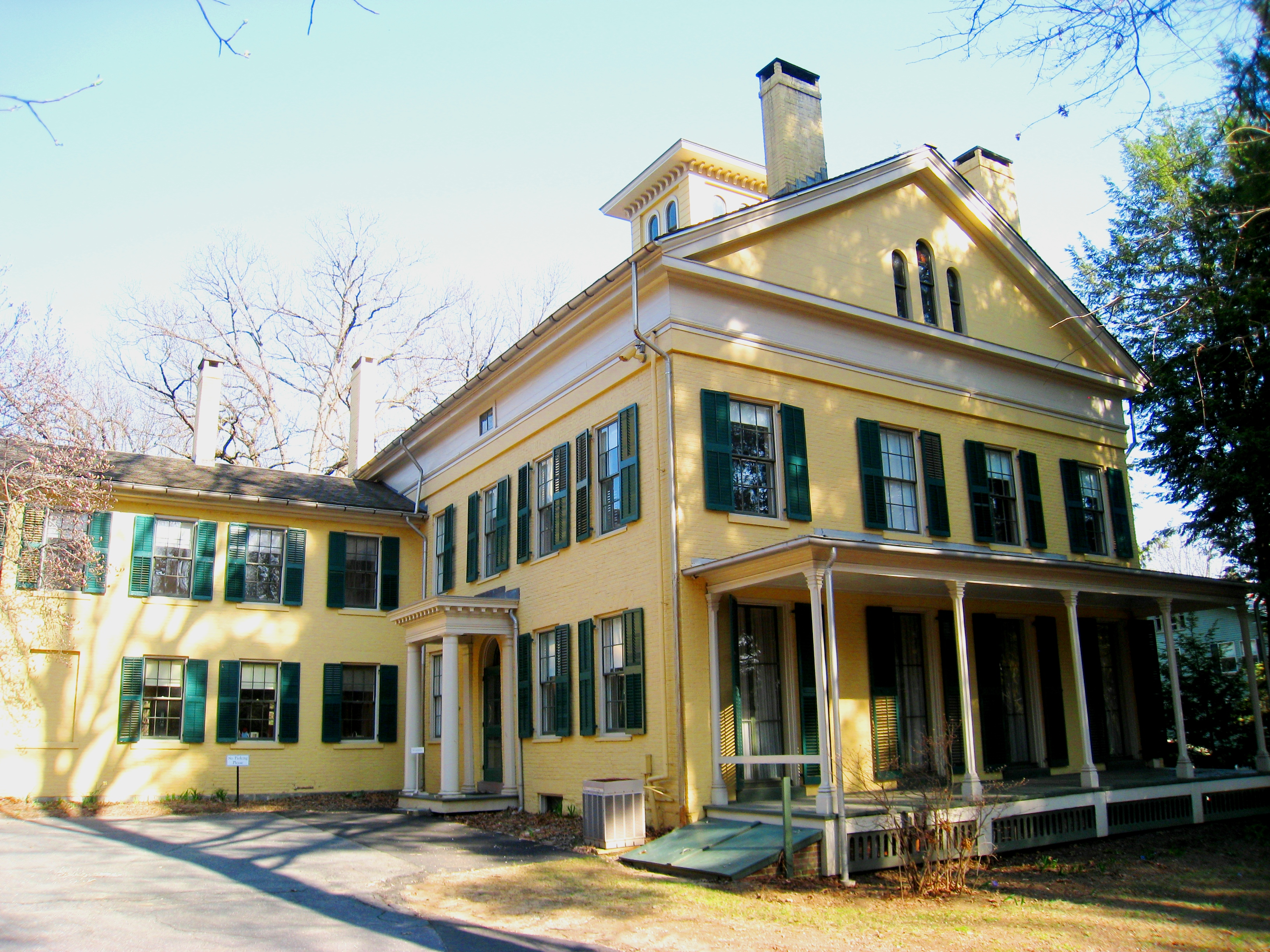
- Emily Dickinson Home

- Location within Massachusetts Location within the United States
- Location: Amherst, Massachusetts
- Coordinates: 42°22′35″N 72°30′55″W
- Built: 1856
- Architect: Pratt, William Fenno; Et al.
- Architectural style: Mid 19th Century Revival, Late 19th And 20th Century Revivals, Late Victorian
- NRHP reference No.: 77000182
- Added to NRHP: August 16, 1977

The Dickinson Historic District is a historic district in Amherst, Massachusetts. Its centerpiece is the Emily Dickinson Home, a National Historic Landmark. The district boundaries encompass Main and Lessey Streets, east of Amherst center, from their junction eastward to Gray Street and the Amherst railroad station, which marks the eastern end of the district. In addition to a number of properties on Main and Lessey Streets, the district also includes Sweetser Park and contributing properties on Tyler Place as well as Triangle, Gray and Kellogg Streets. The district was added to the National Register of Historic Places in 1977. It was designated because of its architecture, and its connection with the locally influential Dickinson family, who (in addition to renowned poet Emily Dickinson) were a locally influential family with roots dating back to early colonial times.

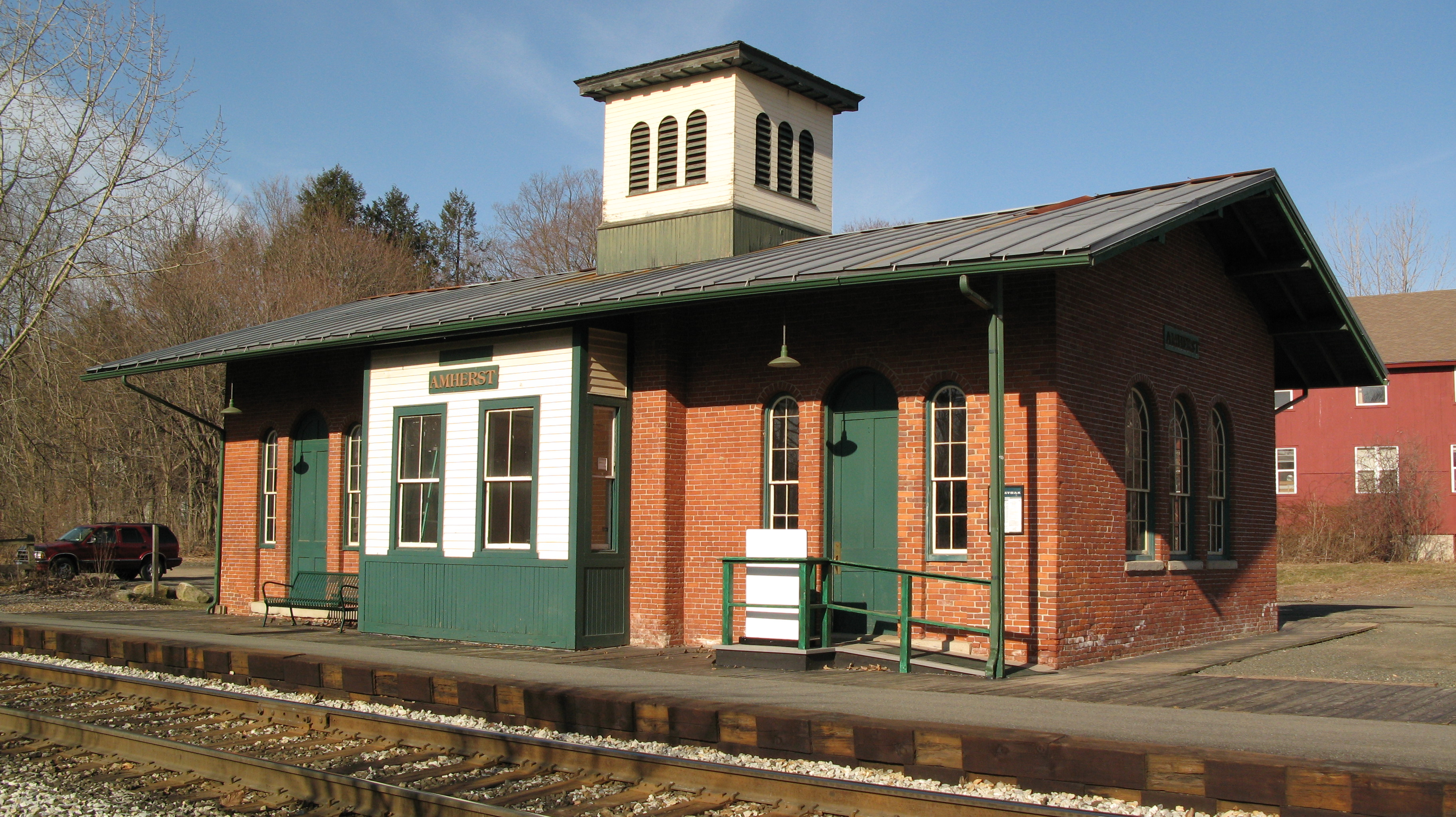
The old Amherst depot

The Emily Dickinson House, built in 1813, is the oldest house within the district, with prominence beyond its association with the poet. Her grandfather Samuel, who built the house, was a founder of Amherst College, and a prominent local politician, as was her father Edward. Her brother William Austin Dickinson was also active in the political and economic life of Amherst, helping found its water and gas companies. Leonard Hills, who lived in two separate houses in the district, ran a distinctive business that manufactured hats out of palm leaves, and was a key figure in the founding of Massachusetts Agricultural College (now the University of Massachusetts at Amherst). The district also includes Amherst's Gothic First Congregational Church (1867), and the brick Italianate Central Vermont Railroad depot (1853), one of the oldest surviving railroad stations in the state.

== See also ==
- National Register of Historic Places listings in Hampshire County, Massachusetts
