= Wild Nights with Emily =

- Directed by: Madeleine Olnek
- Written by: Madeleine Olnek
- Produced by: Anna Margarita Albelo; Casper Andreas; Madeleine Olnek; Max Rifkind-Barron
- Starring: Molly Shannon; Amy Seimetz; Susan Ziegler; Brett Gelman; Jackie Monahan; Kevin Seal; Dana Melanie; Sasha Frolova; Lisa Haas; Stella Chesnut
- Cinematography: Anna Stypko
- Edited by: Tony Clemente Jr. Lee Eaton
- Production companies: P2 Films; UnLTD Productions; Salem Street Entertainment; Embrem Entertainment
- Distributed by: Greenwich Entertainment
- Release dates: March 11, 2018 (South by Southwest); April 12, 2019 (United States)
- Running time: 84 minutes
- Country: United States
- Language: English
- Box office: $519,487

Wild Nights with Emily is a 2018 American romantic comedy film written and directed by Madeleine Olnek. It stars Molly Shannon as Emily Dickinson, as well as Amy Seimetz, Susan Ziegler, Brett Gelman, Jackie Monahan, Kevin Seal, Dana Melanie, Sasha Frolova, Lisa Haas and Stella Chesnut. The film is based on the actual events of Emily Dickinson's life, including her process as a writer, her attempts to get published, and her lifelong romantic relationship with another woman.

It had its world premiere at South by Southwest on March 11, 2018, and was released in the US on April 12, 2019, by Greenwich Entertainment.

The film was nominated for the Independent Spirit John Cassavetes Award at the 35th Independent Spirit Awards.

== Plot ==
In her teens, Emily Dickinson befriends Susan Gilbert during a recitation of the Amherst Shakespeare Society, and during a scene in which they play lovers, a romance blossoms. On a stroll afterward, they kiss. Emily's family leaves for a month long trip, and Susan stays with Emily for the duration. They continue to spend time together, concealing their romantic relationship from others.

Susan gets a teaching job out west, and they write countless love letters to each other's while she is away. When she returns, Emily is surprised to learn that Susan has been betrothed to Emily's brother Austin, which Susan had kept secret from her. Susan apologizes to Emily and explains that it's all part of a greater scheme: Susan cannot financially support herself without getting married, and by marrying Austin they can build a house right next door to Emily and no one will suspect their romance.

Twenty years later, Emily and Susan live next door to each other, and Susan's children deliver their countless notes back and forth between the two houses. Emily shows Susan the poems she has written, some of which are written on scraps of paper and in the margins of recipes, and many of which mention Susan by name. Emily also likes to garden and bake bread for the neighborhood children.

During a period when Susan is too busy to speak to Emily, a recently widowed Kate Scott Turner travels to stay with Susan. But Kate turns out to be more interested in Emily, and ends up staying at her place instead. Kate leaves suddenly, and Emily tells Susan she wishes she'd had a chance to say goodbye and give Kate the pair of garters she sewed for her. Susan is jealous because Emily never made garters for her.

Emily receives the company of Judge Otis Phillips Lords, an old man who confuses the Brontë sisters (describing the book “Wuthering Jane”), falls asleep mid conversation, and calls Emily "plain". While on his way out he stumbles, and at the same moment Emily reaches out to help him, Susan walks in, catching them mid-embrace.

Thomas Wentworth Higginson also visits Emily after she writes about publishing her poems. During their meeting he corrects her on what the meaning of poetry is, describes how women's writing is different than men's writing, and even copy-edits one of her poems right in front of her. He tells her the poems are not ready for publication.

Mabel Todd first comes to Emily's house on an invitation to play the piano for Emily, but is surprised when the maid tells her that she will play alone in the drawing room, and that Emily will remain upstairs to listen to the music while she writes. Mabel meets Austin after moving to Amherst, and they began an affair. They have little shame about it, and frequently appear in public together. They often go to Emily's house to have sex, which Emily avoids by staying in her room. Mabel suggests to Austin that they publish their love letters, but Austin finds that idea too scandalous and tells her to seek for a creative outlet elsewhere.

Emily suddenly becomes ill and passes away. Her sister Lavinia asks Susan to wash the body for burial. After her death, Mabel discovers a chest full of Emily's poems and letters, but she realizes that many of the best ones are addressed to Susan. She enlists the help of Austin to erase all the instances of "Susan" and replace them with men's names instead.

Years later after Emily's work has become successful, Mabel gives a talk to a large group of society women. She tells them that because Emily was such an eccentric recluse, she only saw her face once: in the casket of her funeral. She explains that her poems must have been directed to Judge Otis, and that she added titles to all the poems so that audiences would know exactly what they were about. Emily's niece also gives a lecture about how her aunt and mother were secret lovers, but only three people attend.

The film ends with titles explaining that recent technology has revealed Mabel's erasures and shown that the love letters were indeed written to Susan.

== Cast ==
- Molly Shannon as Adult Emily
  - Dana Melanie as Young Emily
- Amy Seimetz as Mabel
- Susan Ziegler as Adult Susan
  - Sasha Frolova as Young Susan
- Brett Gelman as Higginson
- Jackie Monahan as Adult Lavina
  - Margot Kistler as Young Lavina
- Kevin Seal as Adult Austin
  - John Pena Griswold as Young Austin
- Lisa Haas as Maggie
- Casper Andreas as Joseph Lyman
- Allison Lane as The Widow Kate
- Robert McCaskill as Ralph Waldo Emerson
- David Albiero as David Peck Todd
- Al Sutton as Judge Otis Phillips Lord
- Stella Chestnut

== Production ==
Wild Nights with Emily was originally performed as a play at New York's WOW Café in 1999, and was also produced by Chicago's Caffeine Theatre in 2010 as well as in Boston and Alaska. When she was in college, Olnek used to say that she aspired to be "the Emily Dickinson of comedy" because of the conception at the time that Dickinson had been miserable, but she later found out Dickinson was actually really funny. Olnek was inspired to write Wild Nights with Emily when she read an article in The New York Times Magazine about how new advances in science were changing perceptions of historical figures, and which described how Dickinson's correspondence was altered to conceal her lifelong relationship with another woman. This was contrary to the popular conceptions of Dickinson's life and personality. Research of the film had support from Harvard University Press and the Guggenheim Foundation. Olnek used quotes from Dickinson's letters and poems in Wild Nights with Emily, as to tell the story of this lifelong romantic relationship in Dickinson's own words. The quotes that are used in the film are sometimes spoken and sometimes displayed on the screen.

Olnek knew many of the actors in the film from working with them in the past. She attended NYU with Molly Shannon, and had directed a performance with Shannon for which she first created the character Mary Katherine Gallagher. All these years, Olnek decided to wait to work with Shannon again until she had a story with enough "depth and scale", and Shannon was surprised to be asked because Emily Dickinson is not the type of role that Hollywood would typically offer her. Olnek originally met Amy Seimetz at various film festivals and had always wanted to work with her, and Brett Gelman was recommended by Shannon.

A rough cut of the film won the "US in Progress" award at the Champs-Élysées Film Festival, including a prize of €50,000 for post production and promotion.

Olnek has credited Drunk History as an inspiration for the tone of the film. She thought it was important to include comedy because she has noticed that "some people don't like to be lectured about feminism".

== Release and reception ==
The film premiered at the SXSW film festival. Greenwich Entertainment acquired the distribution rights in November 2018, and it was released in theaters on April 12, 2019. The film was rated PG-13 for "sexual content" by the Motion Picture Association of America, which was given to the film due to a scene in which Austin and Mabel make moaning noises, according to Olnek.

The film holds an 89% rating on review aggregator website Rotten Tomatoes, with 81 reviews counted, with an average rating of 7.3/10. The website's critics consensus reads, "Silly yet deceptively smart, Wild Nights with Emily approaches its oft-investigated subject from a unique -- and utterly entertaining -- vantage point." After accusations of "rewriting history," Olnek put together a 40-page "historical packet" of research supporting her characterization of Dickinson and her relationships.

The New York Times wrote: "The Emily of Olnek's film is not a melancholic recluse, but the heroine of a romantic comedy", and that the film "wrestles with serious themes, dramatizes fully realized relationships, and poses pointed questions about how legacies are devised and maintained."

Author Natalie Goldberg said "Wild Nights With Emily is a wonderful film to show in schools" and deemed it "essential viewing for all students of literature." Critic Alissa Wilkinson included it on her "21 Best Films of 2019" list on VOX.

It became available on DVD and digital streaming beginning February 11, 2020, including on Kanopy for schools and educational purposes.
