= Nathaniel Dickinson (pioneer) =

17th century North American settler

- Coat of Arms of Dickinson
- Born: 3 May 1601; Billingborough, Lincolnshire, England
- Died: 16 June 1676 (aged 75); Hadley, Massachusetts, English America
- Known for: A Founder of Wethersfield, Connecticut, Leading Founder of Hadley, Massachusetts
- Spouse: Anna Gull (m. 1625)
- Children: 12

Nathaniel Dickinson (3 May 1601 – 16 June 1676) was an early English immigrant to America. Dickinson was born in Billingborough, Lincolnshire. He married widow Anna Gull in the mid-1620s and they had at least twelve children, the first five of whom were born in England. Although he was previously thought to have emigrated to America with the Winthrop Fleet, more recent research shows that he and his family likely emigrated between 1636, at which point they still appear in the parish register at Billingborough, and 1638, when they appear in the records in Wethersfield, Connecticut. The family can be traced as early as 1564 in the Billingborough parish register, with the earliest known ancestor a Waters Dickinson, probably born about 1530.

Dickinson held several public offices. In Wethersfield, Connecticut, he served as de facto town clerk before being officially appointed in 1645. He served until 1659. He was a deputy to the Connecticut General Court from 1646 to 1659. Other positions he held included jury member of the Particular Court in 1642, selectman of Wethersfield in 1646, and deacon of the Wethersfield church.

In the late 1650s, he and a group of fellow dissenters from the Wethersfield church organized a new settlement in Hadley, Massachusetts. In 1660, Dickinson was once again appointed town clerk, this time of Hadley. He became the first permanent settler in the town and also surveyed the neighboring towns of Amherst, Belchertown, and Hatfield where he lived for a few years after moving to Hadley to help get the town started up. Back in the 1600s, those town lands included all towns Nathaniel surveyed along with Granby, and South Hadley.

Three of Nathaniel's sons, John, Joseph, and Azariah, were killed in King Philip's War in 1675 and 1676. Nathaniel died shortly after them on June 16, 1676. It is likely that he was not killed by the Indians, but instead died of old age. He was buried in Old Hadley Cemetery, where there is a memorial and plaque. He was among the first Dickinsons in America.

In Northfield, Massachusetts there is a statue along the side of the road on Route 63, not far from the New England campus of Thomas Aquinas College, that commemorates the location where his grandson, Nathaniel Dickinson, age 47, and Ashael Burt, age 40, were murdered and scalped by Native Americans in 1747.

Nathaniel's ancestry was featured on season two, episode three (Philadelphia – Franklin Institute) of the American version of Genealogy Roadshow.

== Notable descendants ==
- Warren Buffett – American billionaire
- Levi Dickenson – Farmer and manufacturer of brooms.
- Daniel S. Dickinson – U.S. senator from New York
- John Dean Dickinson – U.S. representative from New York
- Jonathan Dickinson – Presbyterian minister and one of the founders of Princeton University.
- Edward Dickinson – American politician from Massachusetts
- Emily Dickinson – American poet and writer, his five-greats granddaughter
- Samuel Dickinson – A founder of Amherst College
- William Austin Dickinson – American lawyer
- Amelia Earhart – Pioneer aviation pilot
- Louis Upton – Founder of the Whirlpool Corporation
- Kate Upton – Sports Illustrated and Victoria's Secret model
- Paul Dickinson – Polymer scientist and health enthusiast
- Ashley J. DiMella – Fox News Journalist
