= Otis H. Cooley =

American photographer (1820–1860)

Otis Hubbard Cooley (June 23, 1820 – November 18, 1860) was an American daguerreotype photographer who ran a studio in Springfield, Massachusetts, in the 19th century. The studio produced portraits of poet Emily Dickinson and her sister Lavinia Norcross Dickinson, among others.

He was a native of Granville, Massachusetts.

== Images ==
Portrait of William Howe, ca.1850, by Cooley (U.S. National Portrait Gallery)

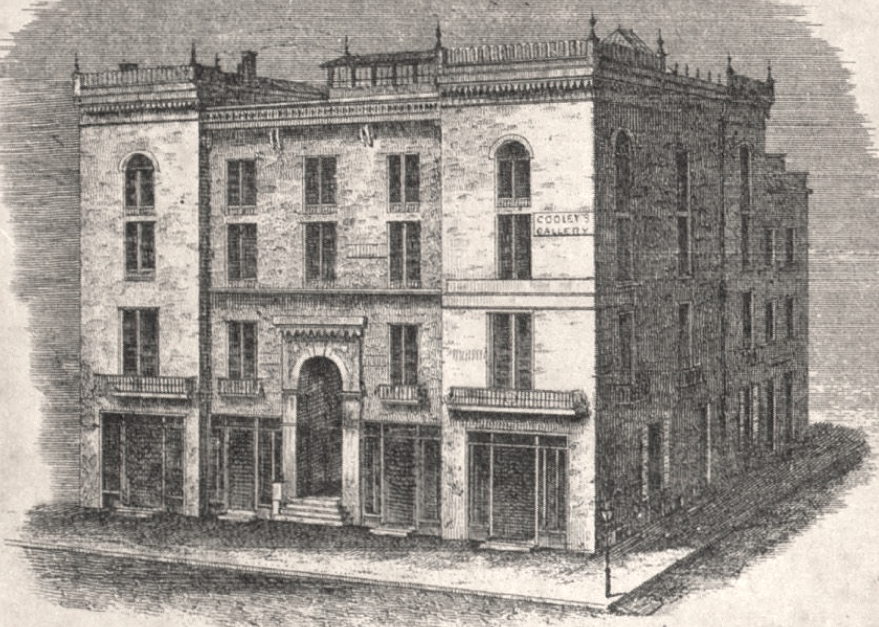
Cooley's Gallery, Springfield, 1851

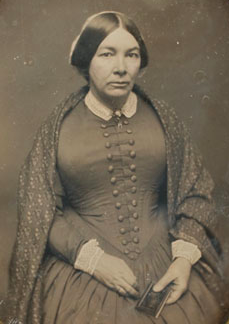
Portrait of an unidentified woman, ca.1852, by Cooley

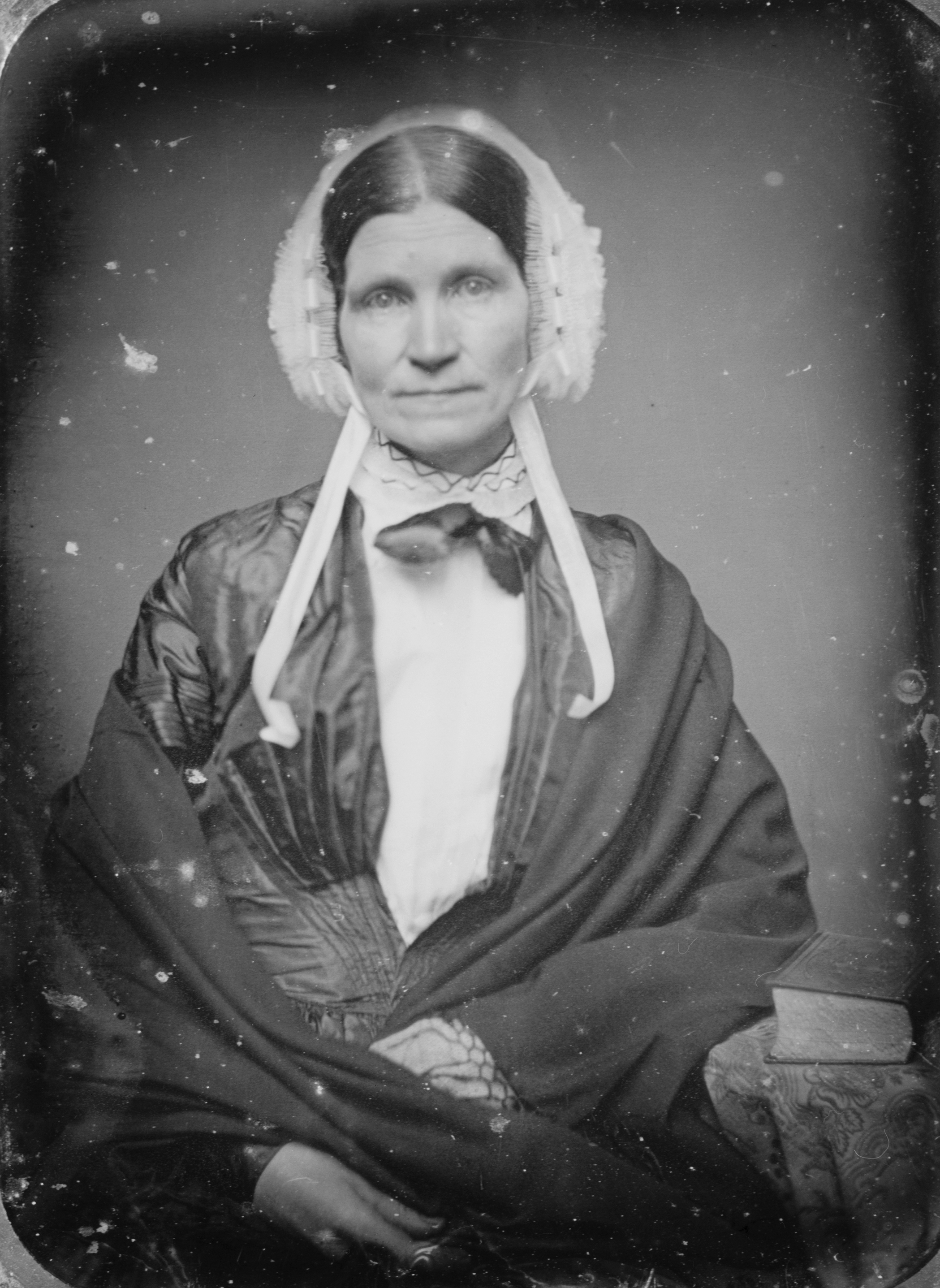
Portrait of Eunice Fiske Durfee, by Cooley (Library of Congress)
