= Wildwood Cemetery (Amherst, Massachusetts) =

Cemetery in Amherst, Massachusetts

- Interactive map of Wildwood Cemetery

Details
- Established: 1887; 139 years ago
- Location: 20 Strong Street, Amherst, Massachusetts, US
- Coordinates: 42°23′18″N 72°30′54″W
- Type: Private, Non-profit
- Size: 81 acres (33 ha)

Wildwood Cemetery is an active non-profit cemetery in Amherst, Massachusetts, United States, designed and laid out in the late 19th century.

== History ==
Wildwood Cemetery is a non-denominational, not-for-profit, 81 acre cemetery located near the center of the college town of Amherst, Massachusetts.

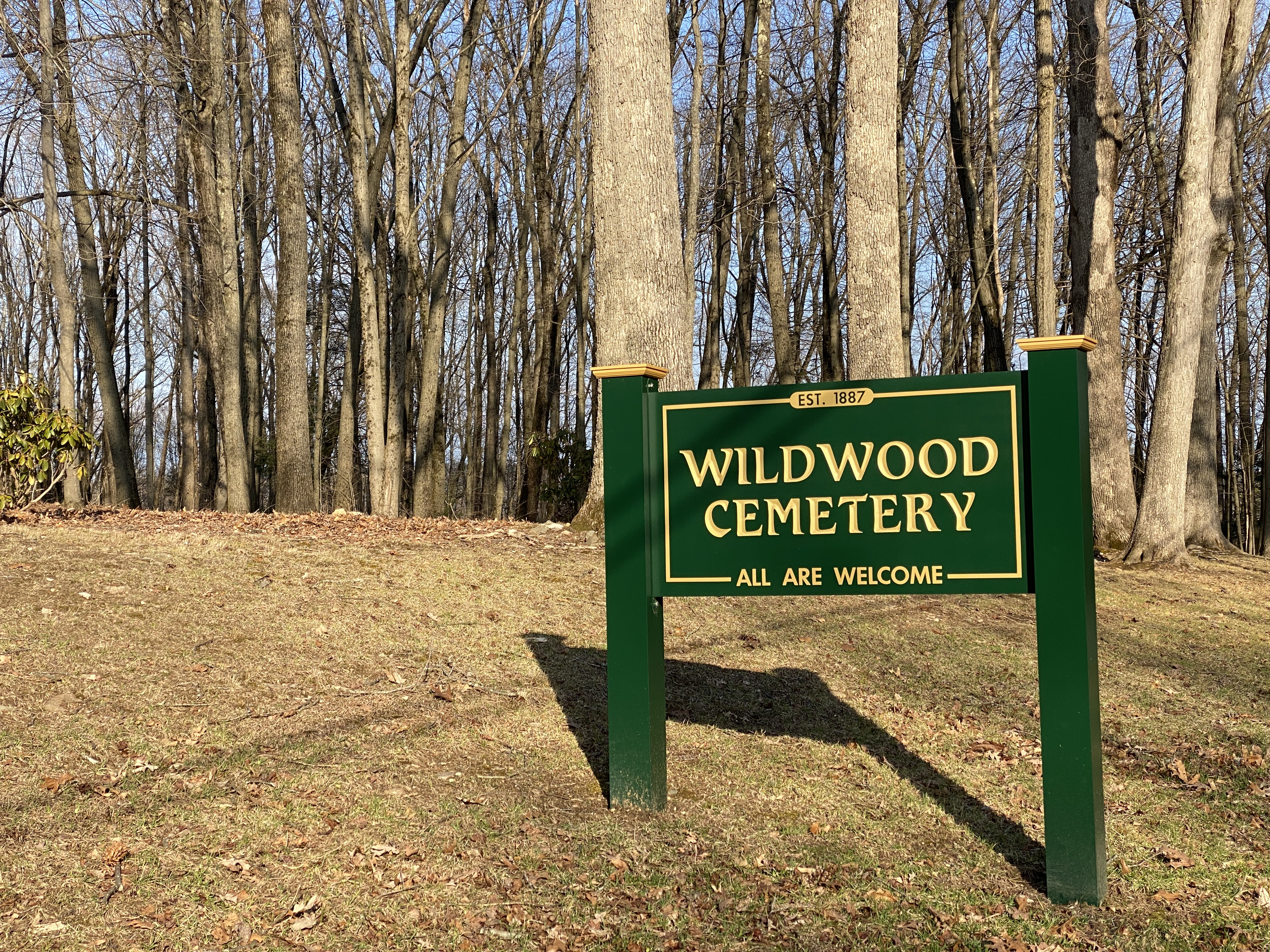
The sign at the main entrance of Wildwood Cemetery in Amherst, Massachusetts

Wildwood is a serene setting atop a hill, just off Pleasant Street which abuts both Amherst College and University of Massachusetts at Amherst.

Established in 1887 with the help of poet Emily Dickinson’s brother Austin, the landscape design was inspired by Fredrick Law Olmsted.

It is an active cemetery with new lots available for purchase. Though there were initial plans for a chapel on site, this did not happen, so services are held graveside.

Bird watchers and naturalists are drawn to the cemetery for the flora and fauna.

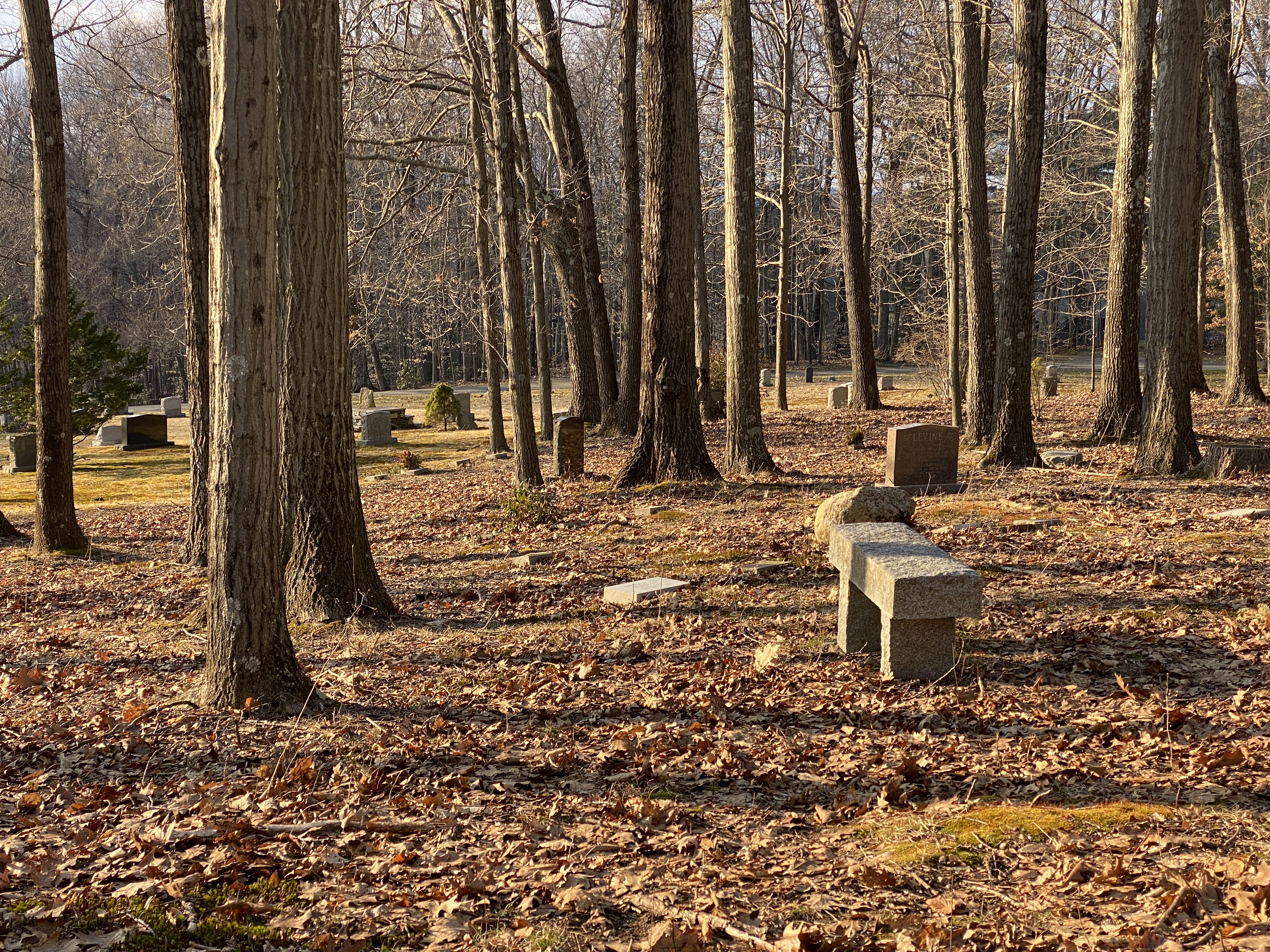
Golden hour light on benches and graves in Amherst’s Wildwood Cemetery

Preserving the appearance and feel of the late nineteenth century guides cemetery decisions.

== Notable interments ==
- Herbert Baxter Adams (1850–1901), historian, author, Johns Hopkins University professor
- George Bosworth Churchill (1866–1925), politician
- Henry Steele Commager (1902–1998), historian, author.
- Susan Huntington Gilbert Dickinson (1830–1913), closest friend of Emily Dickinson, wife of her brother Austin Dickinson.
- William Austin Dickinson (1829–1895), attorney, Amherst College Treasurer, brother of Emily Dickinson.
- Julius Hawley Seelye (1824–1895), politician.
- David Peck Todd (1855–1939), astronomer and Amherst College professor.
- Mabel Loomis Todd (1858–1932), author, speaker, socialite, early editor of poet Emily Dickinson's work.
- Frank Albert Waugh (1869–1943), landscape architect who taught at Massachusetts Agricultural College
- Sidney Waugh (1904–1963), sculptor known for his monuments, medals, etched and molded glass
