= Kate Scott Turner =

American poet (1831–1917)

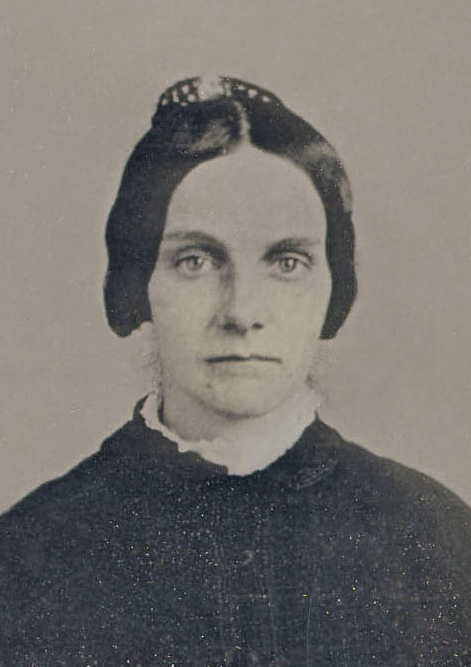
- Turner in 1859
- Born: Catherine Mary Scott; March 12, 1831; Cooperstown, New York, U.S.
- Died: 1917 (aged 85–86); England
- Spouses: Campbell Ladd Turner (m. 1855; died 1857) John Anthon (m. 1866; died 1874)

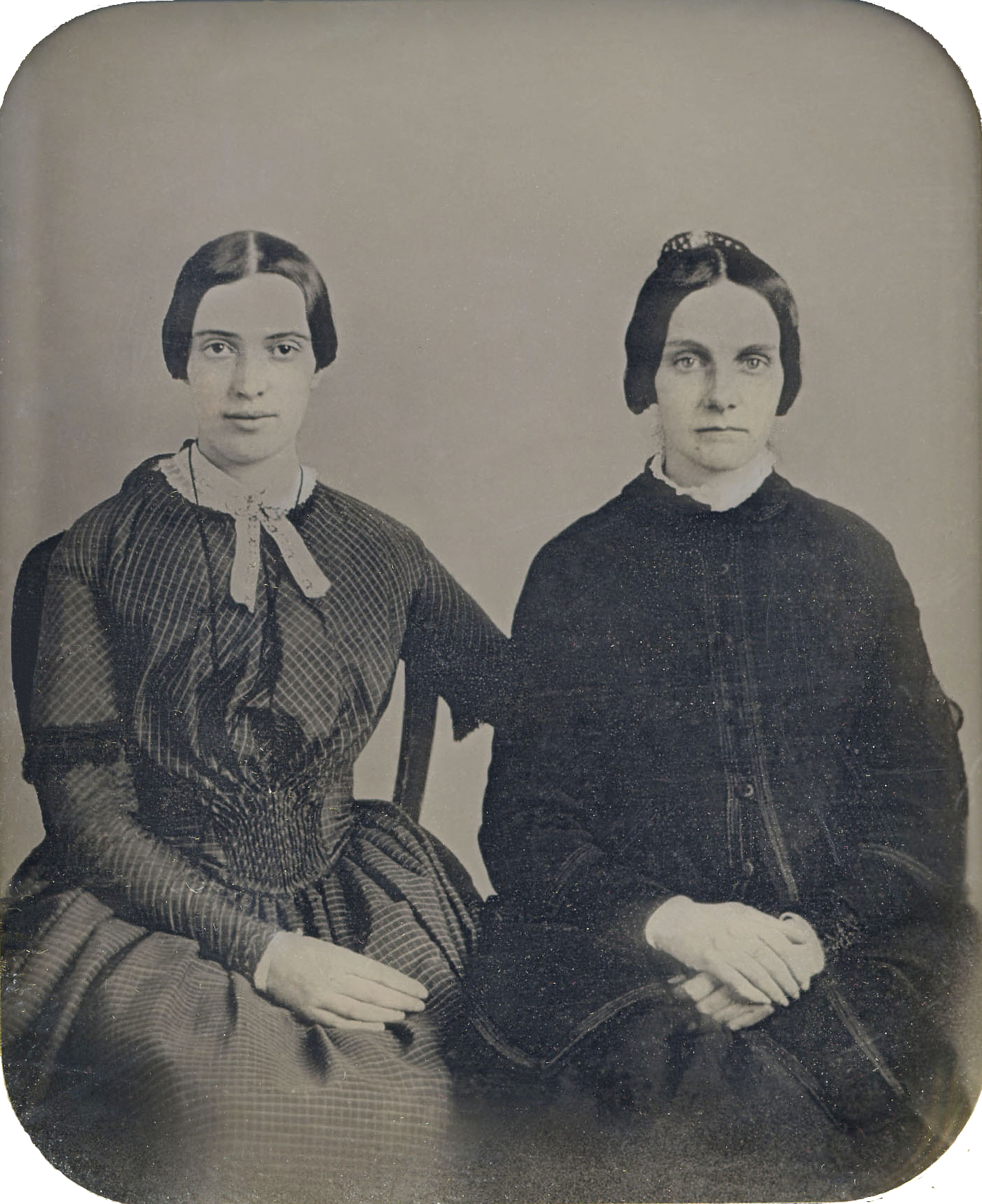
In September 2012, the Amherst College Archives and Special Collections unveiled this daguerreotype, proposing it to be Dickinson and her friend Kate Scott Turner (c. 1859); it has not been authenticated.

Catherine Mary Scott Turner (March 12, 1831 – 1917) was an American poet and a friend of poet Emily Dickinson. She was also known as Kate Anthon.

== Overview ==
Catherine Mary ("Kate") Scott was the daughter of Henry Scott of Cooperstown, New York. She attended the Utica Female Seminary, where in 1848 she met Susan Gilbert, who married Emily Dickinson's brother Austin Dickinson. The women remained friends until Susan's death in 1913.

In 1855, she married Campbell Ladd Turner, who died in 1857 of tuberculosis. Turner was acquainted with Emily Dickinson through Susan, and they remained so until the mid-1860s. Turner married for a second time in 1866 to John Hone Anthon, who died eight years later. She died in 1917 in England, having lived most of her life outside of the United States.

== Emily Dickinson ==
She met Emily Dickinson in 1859. From that time until about 1862, Dickinson sent her four poems. One poem was sent with a pair of garters that Dickinson had knitted for her:

When Katie walks, this simple pair accompany her side,
When Katie runs unwearied they follow on the road,
When Katie kneels, their loving hands still clasp her pious knee —
Ah! Katie! Smile at Fortune, with two so knit to thee!

— Emily Dickinson
