= Wild Nights! =

2008 short story collection by Joyce Carol Oates

- First edition cover
- Author: Joyce Carol Oates
- Language: English
- Genre: Short story collection
- Publisher: Ecco Press
- Publication date: April 1, 2008
- Publication place: United States
- Media type: Print
- Pages: 256
- ISBN: 978-0-06-143479-2
- OCLC: 1021139970

Wild Nights! Stories About the Last Days of Poe, Dickinson, Twain, James, and Hemingway is a collection of short stories by American author Joyce Carol Oates, published in April 2008 by Ecco. As the title suggests, the stories are about the final days in the lives of authors Edgar Allan Poe, Emily Dickinson, Mark Twain, Henry James, and Ernest Hemingway. The title comes from Dickinson's poem "Wild Nights – Wild Nights!", which also serves as its epigraph.

== Stories ==
The collection features five stories, each about a different author. All were previously published, as indicated:

- "Poe Posthumous; or, The Light-House" (anthology McSweeney's Enchanted Chamber of Astonishing Stories, 2004, as "The Fabled Light-House of Viña del Mar") – Edgar Allan Poe
- "EDickinsonRepliLuxe" (Virginia Quarterly Review Supplement: Writers on Writers, Fall 2006) – Emily Dickinson
- "Grandpa Clemens & Angelfish, 1906" (Timothy McSweeney's Quarterly Concern, Fall 2006) – Mark Twain
- "The Master at St. Bartholomew's Hospital, 1914–1916" (Conjunctions, Spring 2007) – Henry James
- "Papa at Ketchum, 1961" (Salmagundi, Summer/Fall 2007) – Ernest Hemingway
