= Emily Norcross Dickinson =

Mother of Emily Dickinson (1804–1882)

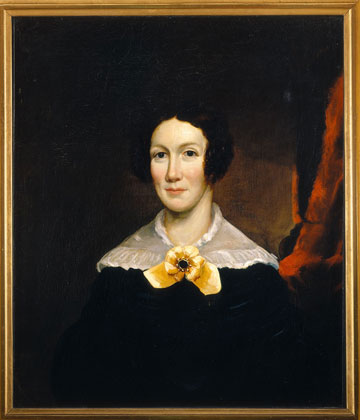
Portrait of Emily Norcross Dickinson, 1840. By Otis Bullard

Emily Norcross Dickinson (née Norcross; July 3, 1804 – November 14, 1882) was a member of the Dickinson family of Amherst, Massachusetts, and the mother of American poet Emily Dickinson.

== Early life and education ==
Emily Norcross was born in 1804 in Monson, Massachusetts, to Joel and Betsy (née Fay) Norcross. She was one of nine children, although four of her siblings died at a young age. Her father was a staunch believer in women's education, and sent Emily to Monson Academy for several years, before having her attend a boarding school in New Haven, Connecticut.

== Courtship and marriage to Edward Dickinson ==
In 1826, Edward Dickinson, who was training to be a lawyer in Amherst, Massachusetts, traveled up to Monson on legal business and met Emily Norcross. She caught his attention, and the two struck up a lengthy correspondence. Over two years, they wrote ninety-three letters to one another, with Edward writing sixty-nine and Emily writing twenty-four. Edward constantly showed his affection for Emily in his letters, whereas Emily was the much more laconic in her replies. She knew that her lack of enthusiasm frustrated Edward and wasn't afraid to let him know it, writing once in a letter "Frequent repetition of my disobedience I trust will not exhaust your patience, which I think has been faithfully tried." On October 30, 1826, she reluctantly accepted his proposal, saying that "you may rightly conclude that my feelings are in unison with yours."

== Later life and death ==
In 1829, she gave birth to her and Edward's first son, Austin Dickinson. One year later, she, Edward, and Austin moved to the Homestead (now the Emily Dickinson Museum), where their daughters Emily and Lavinia were born. Her husband's busy career as a lawyer and as the treasurer of nearby Amherst College meant that she often stayed home with her children, which made her often feel isolated and lonely. In 1855, she endured a particularly troubling period of depression. She spent most of her time at home, either taking care of her household or tending her garden, which was her biggest passion in life. She suffered a stroke in 1874 from which she never truly recovered, and spent the remainder of her years paralyzed until her death in November 1882.

== Relationship with her daughter, Emily ==
Emily Norcross Dickinson never developed a deep relationship with her daughter Emily, who found her mother uninteresting. Emily Dickinson once wrote in a letter to T.W. Higginson that "my mother does not care for thought." In a later letter to Higginson in 1870, she bluntly said that "I never had a mother. I suppose a mother is one to whom you hurry when you are troubled." Emily Dickinson scholar Vivian Pollack suggests that the distance between Emily and her mother had an impact on her poetry, and that it contributed the sense of loneliness in her works. After her mother died, however, Emily started to show more compassion towards her mother. Writing to her close friend Elizabeth Holland, Dickinson remarked, "when we were Children and she journeyed, she always brought us something. Now, would she bring us but herself, what an only Gift."

== Bibliography ==
- Pollack, Vivian R. (1988). A Poet's Parents. Chapel Hill: University of North Carolina Press. ISBN 978-0-8078-6751-8.
