= Amherst West Cemetery =

Historic cemetery in Massachusetts, United States

- U.S. National Register of Historic Places
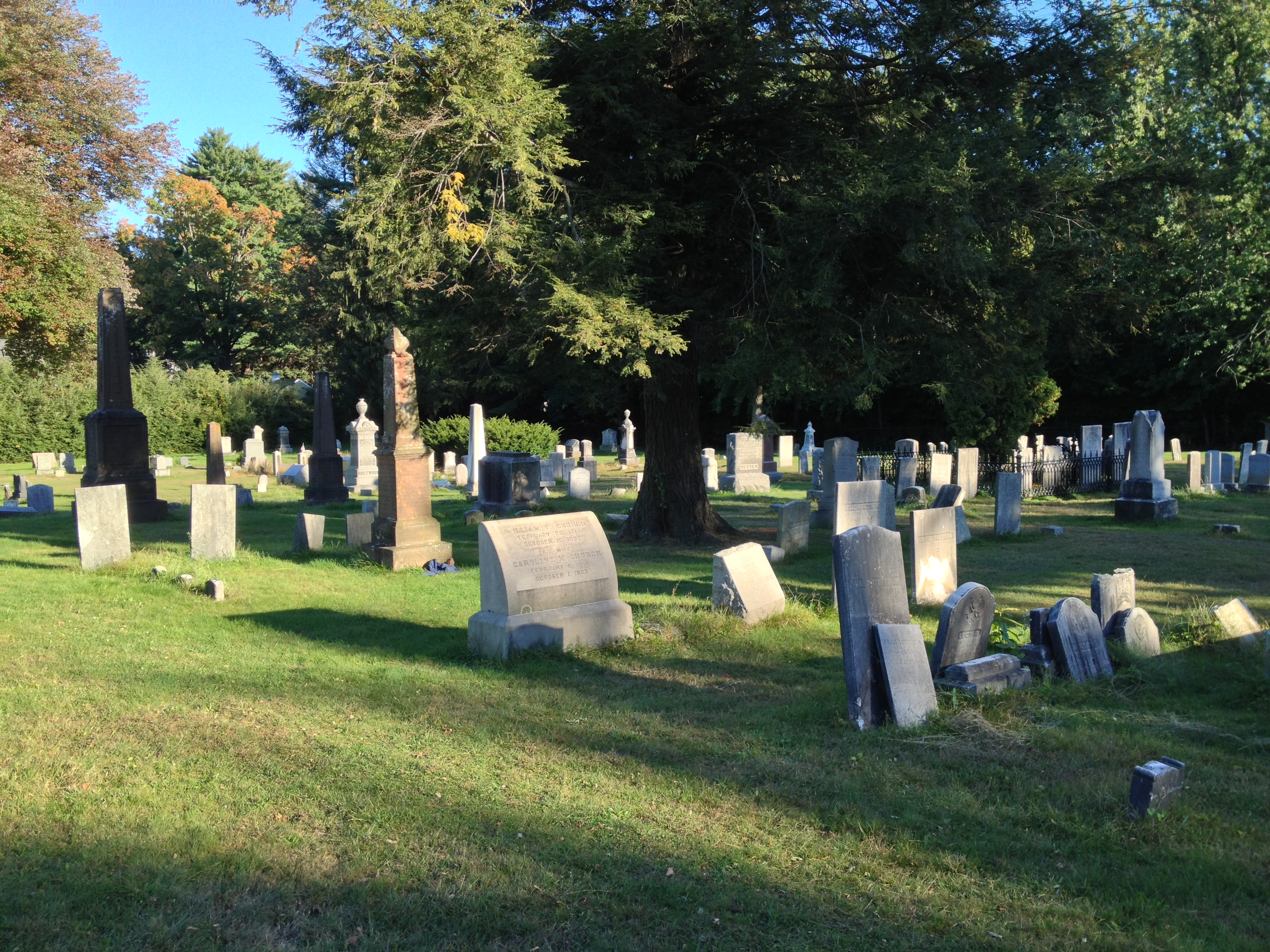

- Location within Massachusetts Location within the United States
- Location: Amherst, Massachusetts
- Coordinates: 42°22′45″N 72°31′7″W
- Built: 1737
- NRHP reference No.: 00000534
- Added to NRHP: May 26, 2000

Amherst West Cemetery is a historic cemetery on Triangle Street in Amherst, Massachusetts. The 4-acre (1.6 ha) cemetery was first laid out in 1730, when the voters of Hadley elected to establish a new burying ground in its eastern precinct. When the area was separated as Amherst in 1786, the property was taken over by the newly established town. In addition to being the burial site of many of Amherst's early settlers and American Civil War veterans (both white and African American), it is also the burial site of members of the Dickinson family, most notably the poet Emily Dickinson. Their family plot is set off from the rest of the cemetery by a wrought iron fence.

The oldest portion of the cemetery is in the southwest, where there are hundreds of older slate gravemarkers. The oldest marked site is dated 1737, although there may well be earlier unmarked burials. Over two dozen carvers have been identified as creators of the colonial-era markers. Markers placed during the Victorian era were made predominantly of limestone and brownstone, which gradually gave way to granite, especially for marking the sites of well-to-do families. A portion in the southeast of the cemetery contains mainly African American burials, with much simpler burial stones and markings than elsewhere in the cemetery.

When first laid out, the cemetery was about 1 acre (0.40 ha), and was laid out very simply. As it grew during the 19th century, lanes were laid out and the property was fenced off. The present figure-eight pattern of lanes was adopted in 1854. The first main gate, the Gaylord Gates on Pleasant Street, was built in 1907, but was replaced in 1954 with the construction of the Burnham Gates on Triangle Street. The older gate is made of simple granite piers, and is normally chained. The Burnham Gates are made of ashlar stone piers, topped with molded cornices and pyramidal capstones.

The cemetery was listed on the National Register of Historic Places in 2000.

== Notable burials ==
- William S. Clark (1826-1886), American college professor and American Civil War veteran
- Edward Dickinson (1803-1874), American politician, father of Emily Dickinson
- Emily Dickinson (1830-1886), American poet
- Ebenezer Mattoon (1755-1843), United States Representative
- Zephaniah Swift Moore (1770-1823), American clergyman and educator

== See also ==
- National Register of Historic Places listings in Hampshire County, Massachusetts
