= Emily Dickinson Museum =

Historic house in Massachusetts, United States

- Emily Dickinson Home
- U.S. National Register of Historic Places
- U.S. National Historic Landmark
- U.S. Historic district – Contributing property
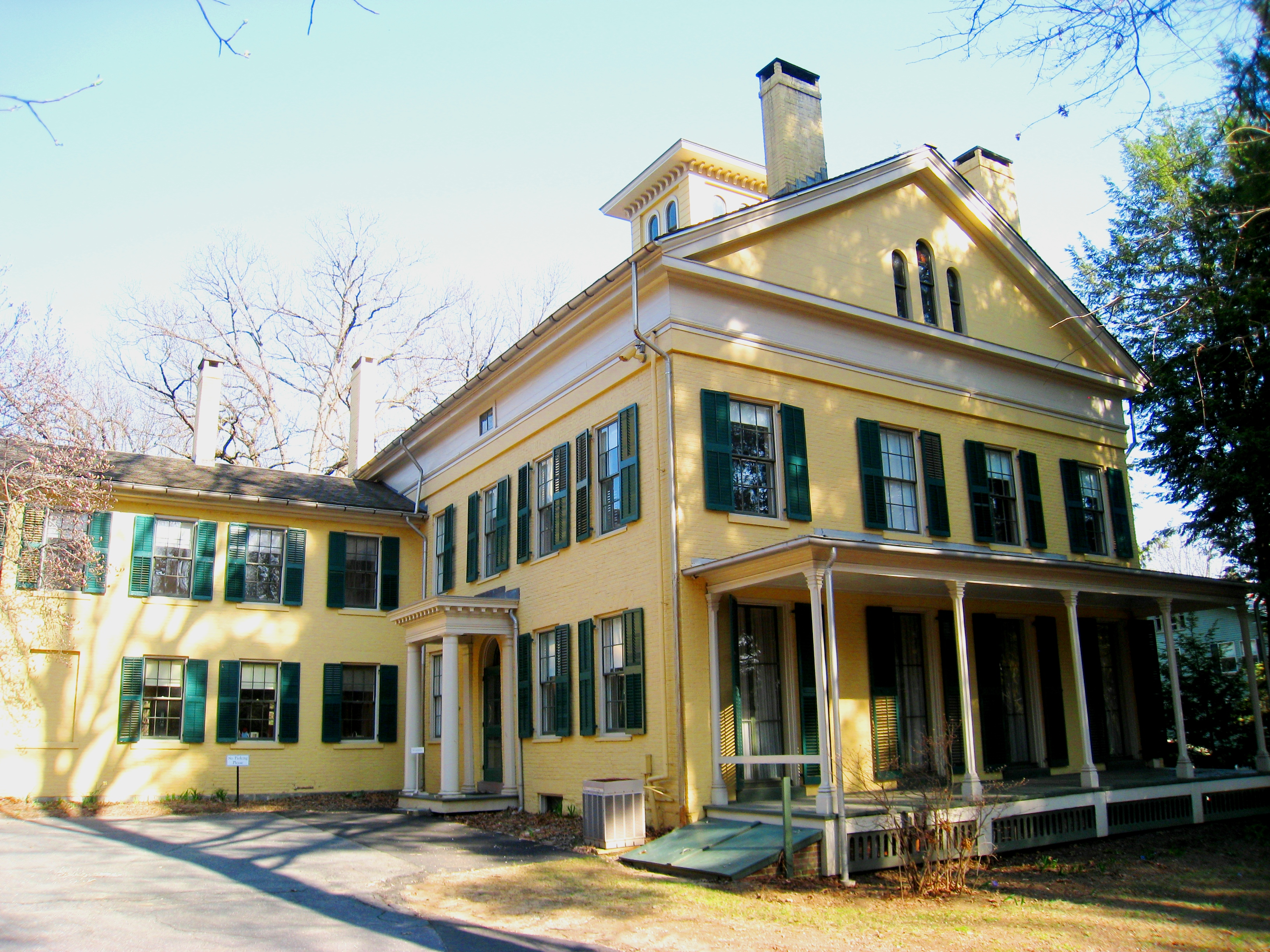
- Dickinson Homestead, home of poet Emily Dickinson

- Location within Massachusetts Location within the United States
- Interactive map showing the location of Emily Dickinson Home Museum
- Location: 280 Main St., Amherst, Massachusetts
- Coordinates: 42°22′34″N 72°30′52″W
- Area: 3 acres (1.2 ha)
- Built: 1813
- Architectural style: Federal
- Website: emilydickinsonmuseum.org
- Part of: Dickinson Historic District (ID77000182)
- NRHP reference No.: 66000363

Significant dates
- Added to NRHP: October 15, 1966
- Designated NHL: December 29, 1962
- Designated CP: August 16, 1977

The Emily Dickinson Museum is a historic house museum consisting of two houses: the Dickinson Homestead (also known as Emily Dickinson Home or Emily Dickinson House) and the Evergreens. The Dickinson Homestead was the birthplace and home from 1855 to 1886 of 19th-century American poet Emily Dickinson (1830–1886), whose poems were discovered in her bedroom there after her death. The house next door, called the Evergreens, was built by the poet's father, Edward Dickinson, in 1856 as a wedding present for her brother Austin. Located in Amherst, Massachusetts, the houses are preserved as a single museum and are open to the public on guided tours.

The Emily Dickinson Home is a US National Historic Landmark, and properties contribute to the Dickinson Historic District, listed on the National Register of Historic Places.

== History ==
The Dickinson family had a long record of residency in the Connecticut River valley, dating back to the early days of English colonial settlement of the area. Emily Dickinson's great-grandfather Nathaniel Dickinson was one of the founders of Hadley, Massachusetts and surveyed the lands around the area including today's Amherst, Massachusetts. Nathan Dickinson moved to the relatively new town of Amherst, Massachusetts in 1742. By the early 19th century, the Dickinson family had accumulated some 14 acres (5.7 ha) of land on the east side of town. In 1813, Samuel Fowler Dickinson (1775–1838) built the Dickinson Homestead on Main Street, its grandeur reflecting his prominence as a lawyer. His financial affairs, however, were less secure, and by 1817 he had mortgaged the house for $2,500. In 1825, he mortgaged the Homestead again, along with other properties, to Oliver Smith for $6,000. In 1828, when Samuel Fowler Dickinson went bankrupt, Smith sold the mortgaged properties to John Leland and Nathan Dickinson, Samuel's nephew.

=== Edward Dickinson's residency ===
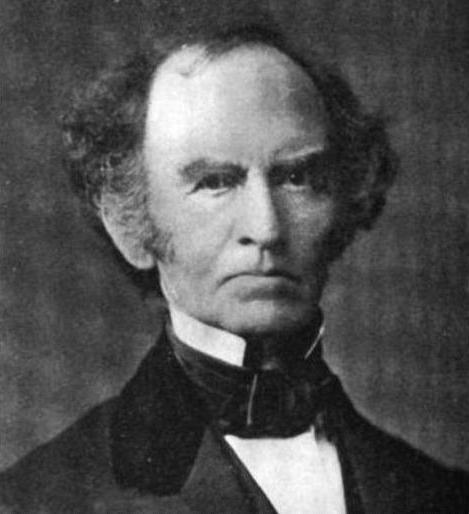
Edward Dickinson, Emily's father

In March 1830, Samuel Fowler Dickinson's eldest son Edward purchased the western half of the Homestead for $1,500, and moved in with his wife and young son Austin. Nine months later, on December 10, their second child, Emily Dickinson, was born there. Lavinia was born there three years later.

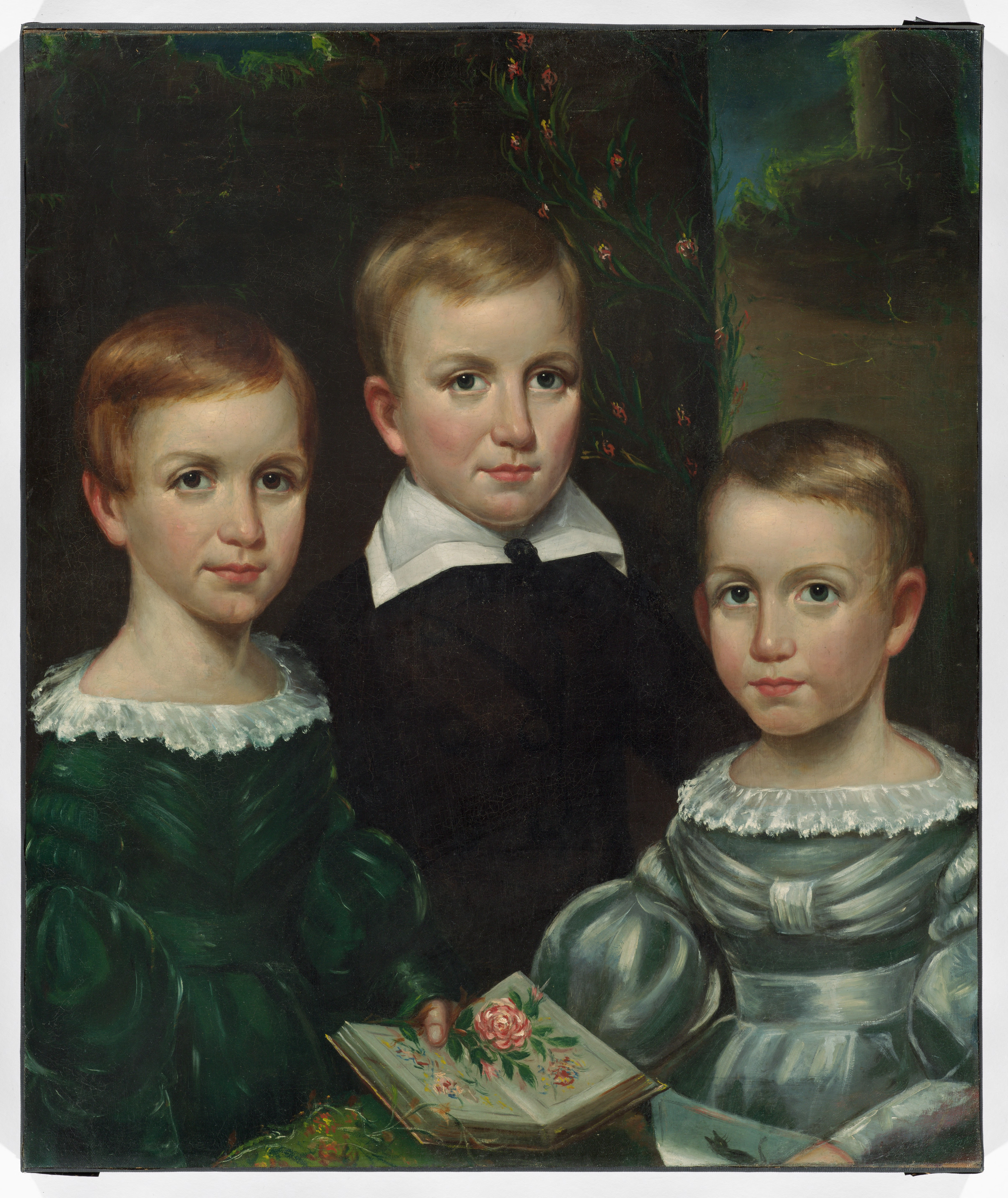
Portrait of Edward Dickinson's children, c. 1840

In 1833, persistent money troubles forced Edward to sell the Homestead back to Leland and Nathan, who in turn gave the entire property to General David Mack Jr. Mack's family occupied the western half of the Homestead, while Edward and his family moved into the eastern half. They remained there until 1840, when they moved to a nearby house on West Street (now North Pleasant), overlooking Amherst's West Cemetery. By 1855, fifteen years later, Edward had risen to prominence and wealth, and was able to purchase the entire Homestead and surrounding land for $6,000 after Mack's death. The family moved back to the Homestead in 1856. That same year, Edward began construction of The Evergreens just west of the Homestead, presenting it as a wedding gift to his son Austin and new wife Susan.

The property included a 1.5-acre (0.61 ha) garden, which was tended by Emily, Lavinia, and their mother, and Emily often sent flowers along with notes to her acquaintances. A large barn stood directly behind the house to shelter the family's horses, cow, and chickens and provide rooms for the groundskeeper. Linking the two Dickinson houses was a path described by Emily Dickinson as "just wide enough for two who love," crossing the lawn from the back door of the Homestead to the east piazza of The Evergreens.

In the 1860s, Edward and Austin Dickinson planted a low hemlock hedge that spanned the street frontage of both houses. Edward Dickinson died in 1874; his funeral service was held in the Homestead. His wife died, after years of chronic illness and a stroke, in 1882.

=== Emily Dickinson's residency ===
Emily Dickinson occupied the Homestead for much of her life. The longest absence was between 1840 and 1855, when the family's finances necessitated a move. Beginning in the 1850s she became increasingly secluded from outside contact, although the reasons for this are not entirely clear. She took to interacting with visitors through closed doors, and did not travel unless necessary. In 1868 she wrote to Thomas Wentworth Higginson, a regular correspondent, that "I do not cross my Father's ground to any House or town" in response to his suggestion that she come to Boston so they might meet. She did, however, tend the flower garden, which was locally appreciated, and visited her brother's family next door. She died in 1886, and her funeral service was held in the Homestead's library.

Pursuant to Emily's wishes, her sister Lavinia destroyed her correspondence. She found the bulk of Emily's poetry in a locked chest in Emily's room, and immediately recognized the collection's significance. The complete works were first published in 1955.

=== Later history ===
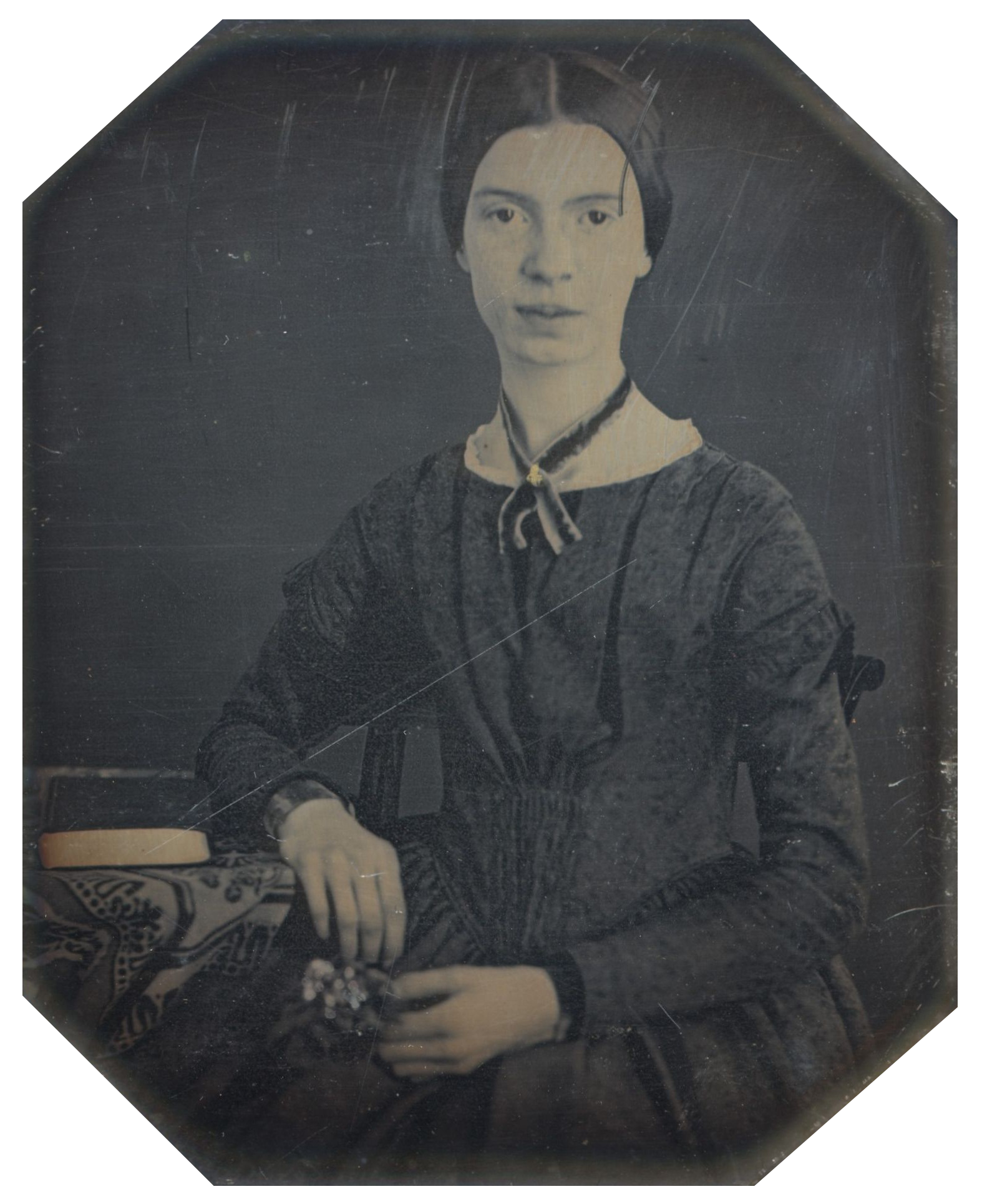
Daguerreotype of Emily Dickinson, c. 1848

The longest-lived member of the family was Lavinia, who occupied the Homestead until her death in 1899. At that time, the Homestead was inherited by Austin's daughter, Martha Dickinson Bianchi. She leased the house to tenants until 1916, when she sold it to the Parke family. In 1963 the house was designated a National Historic Landmark. In 1965, the Parke family sold the house to the Trustees of Amherst College. The college used the house for faculty housing, but opened portions of the house, including Emily's room, for public tours.

Next door, Austin and Susan Dickinson lived at The Evergreens until their respective deaths in 1895 and 1913. Martha Dickinson Bianchi, their only surviving child, continued to live in the house, and preserved it, without change, until her own death in 1943. Her heirs – co-editor Alfred Leete Hampson, and later his widow, Mary Landis Hampson – continued to preserve the house as a "time capsule" of a prosperous nineteenth-century household in a New England town, recognizing the tremendous historical and literary significance of a site left completely intact. In 1991, The Evergreens passed to a private testamentary trust, the Martha Dickinson Bianchi Trust, which began developing the house as a museum.

The trust's work led to discussions with the college over collaboration between the two on administration of their respective properties. These culminated in the merger of the two efforts in 2003, when the trust transferred ownership of The Evergreens to Amherst College, and the Emily Dickinson Museum was formally established to manage the recombined properties.

== Architecture and landscaping ==
The houses today are located at 280 Main Street, across the street from the First Congregational Church (constructed in 1739). The property is one block east of the center of town and two blocks north of Amherst College. It is bounded on the south by Main Street, on the east by Triangle Street, on the north by Lessey Street, and on the west by a public park. The grounds include a wide lawn east of the buildings, which was originally the site of the Dickinson family gardens.

=== The Homestead ===
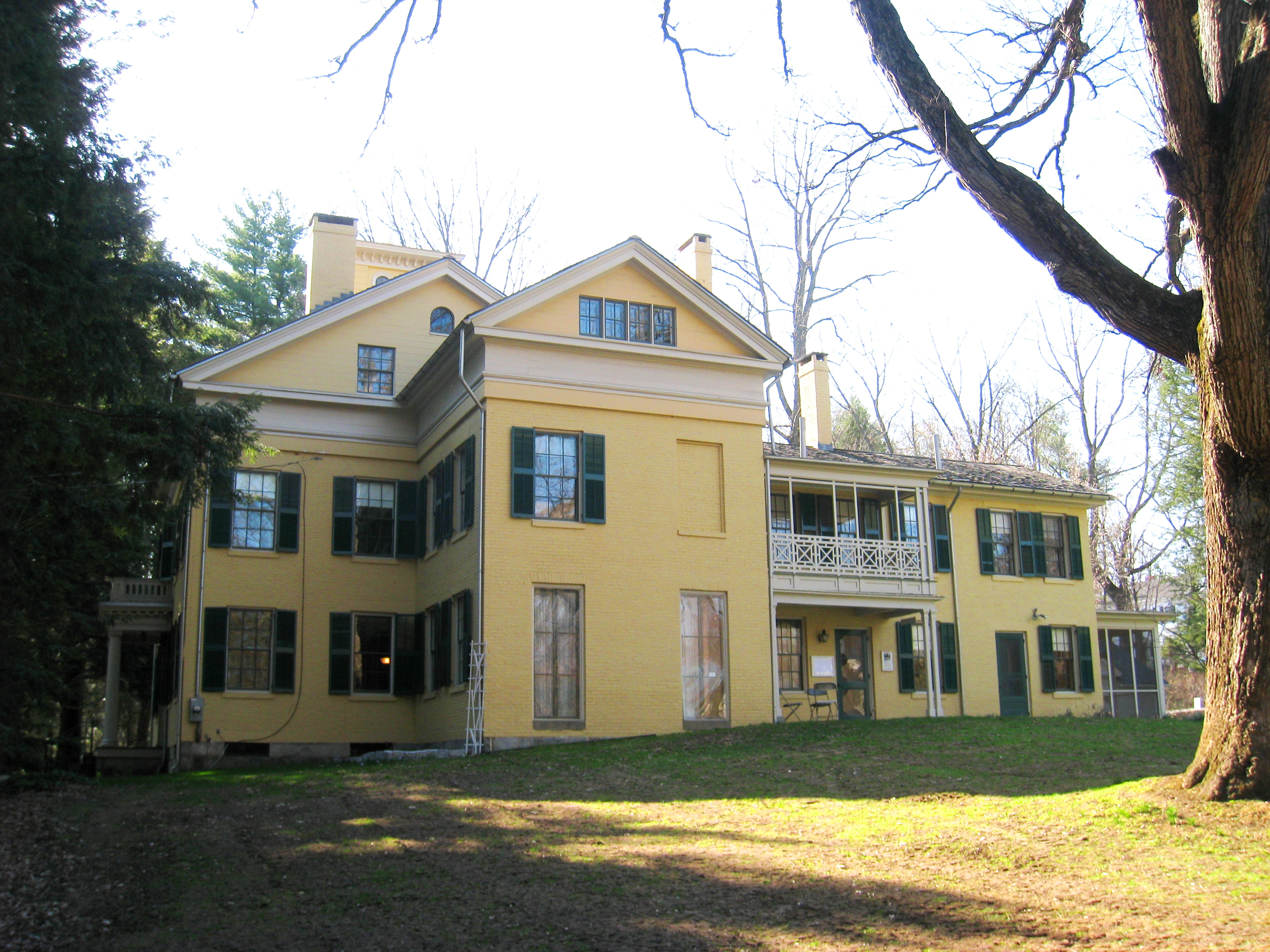
The Homestead

The Homestead began as a fashionable Federal style house, and was probably the first brick house in Amherst. It was originally painted red to mask the color and texture variations of bricks and mortar. Subsequent changes to the house in the 1830s and 1840s introduced Greek Revival architectural features as well as stylish white paint on the facades exposed to more public scrutiny. During his ownership, General Mack "enlarged the attic space by replacing the hip roof with gables, raised the roof line on the north and south sides, and added a second story to the wooden 'office' on the west".

Edward Dickinson made extensive interior and exterior alterations to the Homestead in 1855. He built a brick addition for the kitchen and laundry on the back of the house, erected a veranda on the western side, embellished the roof with an Italianate cupola, and built a conservatory for Emily's exotic plants. He finished the house in an ochre and off-white paint scheme, one that it wore until 1916, when new owners removed all layers of paint through a sandblasting process and painted the woodwork white in accord with early twentieth-century Colonial Revival tastes.

In 2004 the Homestead was repainted in its late-nineteenth-century colors to show it as Emily Dickinson knew it. The restoration also removed aging storm windows, repointed areas of failing masonry, and restored nearly 100 shutters and other architectural elements.

In 2009 the plaster ceiling in the front parlor of the Homestead collapsed into the room. The building was open for tours at the time of the collapse but no injuries were sustained by visitors or staff.

=== The Evergreens ===
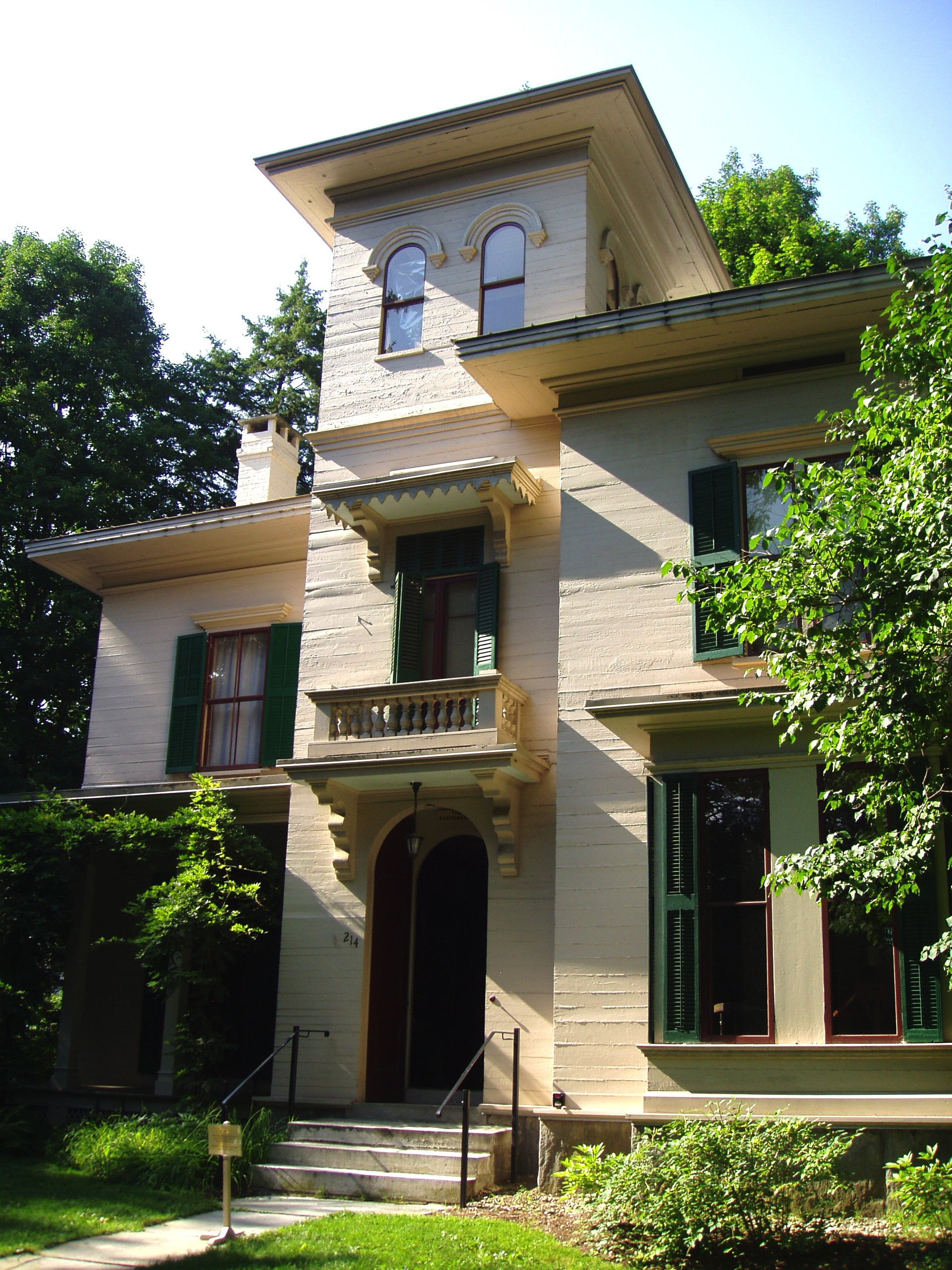
The Evergreens, home of Austin Dickinson

Designed by well-known Northampton architect William Fenno Pratt, the house is one of the earliest and best-preserved examples of Italianate domestic architecture in Amherst. The house is still completely furnished with Dickinson family furniture, household accoutrements, and decor selected and displayed by the family during the nineteenth century.

Situated on two high terraces, The Evergreens was surrounded by cultivated planting beds and looked out to the west over a neighbor's orchard. Austin Dickinson applied the design principles of Andrew Jackson Downing and Frederick Law Olmsted to The Evergreens' landscape. His wife, Susan, tended flower gardens that were held in high regard by townspeople. The lawn between the Homestead and The Evergreens was carefully arranged with an informal distribution of trees and shrubs meant to suggest natural growth, a mix of local and exotic specimens, and open areas where family members played lawn tennis and badminton.

As Treasurer of Amherst College (1873–1895), Austin Dickinson was also deeply involved in landscaping of the college grounds, cultivating at the same time a close relationship with prominent landscape architects Frederick Law Olmsted and Calvert Vaux. He later led the effort to drain and beautify the town common, and spearheaded the drive to form a new style of park-like cemetery in Amherst after the fashion of Mount Auburn Cemetery in Cambridge.

== Museum ==
Guided tours of the Emily Dickinson Museum are offered from March through December. The grounds and gardens are open to the public, but the interiors of both houses are only accessible by guided tour. Specially themed tours change periodically. The museum also hosts literary events that vary from year to year, including contemporary poetry readings and an annual poetry festival. The museum is a member of Museums10, an association of ten museums in the Amherst area. The museum is owned by Amherst College.

== See also ==
- Dickinson Historic District
- List of museums in Massachusetts
- List of National Historic Landmarks in Massachusetts
- List of residences of American writers
- National Register of Historic Places listings in Hampshire County, Massachusetts
