= Susan Huntington Gilbert Dickinson =

American writer, poet, traveler, and editor

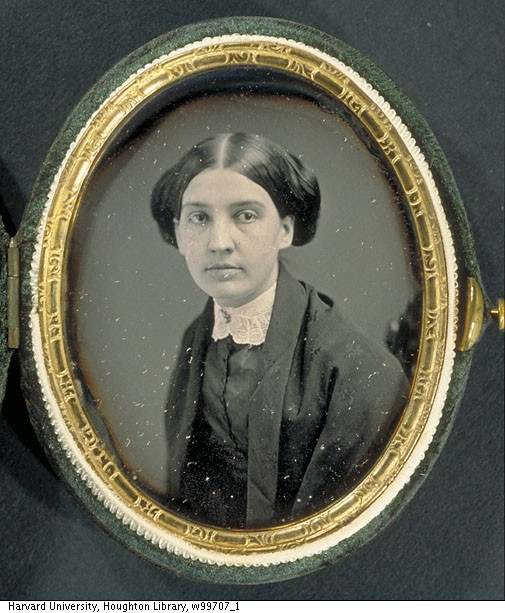
- Born: December 19, 1830; Old Deerfield, Massachusetts, US
- Died: May 12, 1913 (aged 82); Amherst, Massachusetts, US
- Occupations: Writer; poet; editor
- Spouse: Austin Dickinson (m. 1856; died 1895)
- Children: 3
- Relatives: Emily Dickinson (sister-in-law)

Susan Huntington Gilbert Dickinson (December 19, 1830 – May 12, 1913) was an American writer, poet, traveler, and editor. She was a lifelong friend and sister-in-law of poet Emily Dickinson.

== Life ==
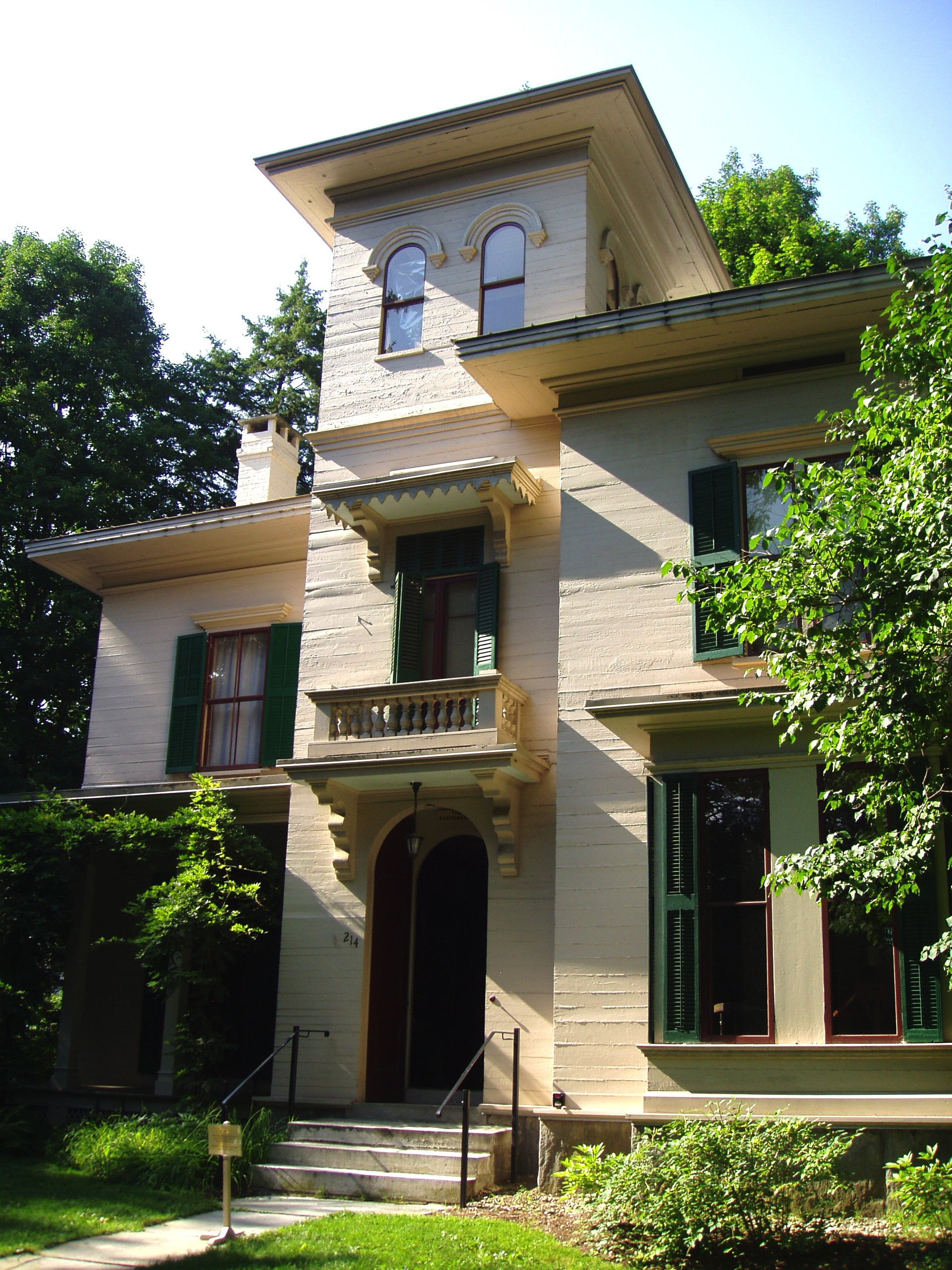
The Evergreens, home of Susan and Austin Dickinson, contributed by the Emily Dickinson Museum of Amherst

Susan Huntington Gilbert was born December 19, 1830, in Old Deerfield, Massachusetts, the youngest of six children born to Thomas and Harriet (Arms) Gilbert. She was orphaned by the time she was eleven years old, after her mother died in 1837 and her father in 1841. Gilbert lived with her aunt, Sophia (Arms) Van Vranken, in Geneva, New York, until the late 1840s. She then lived in Amherst, Massachusetts, with her sister Harriet and brother-in-law William Cutler. In Amherst, she attended Utica Female Academy and Amherst Academy for one semester in the fall of 1847.

In 1853, she was engaged to Austin Dickinson. Their marriage in the Van Vranken home on July 1, 1856, was "a quiet wedding" with "very few friends and [only Susan's] brothers & sisters, a little cake–a little ice cream." Although the young couple contemplated moving to Michigan, Austin's father Edward Dickinson ensured they would stay in Amherst by making Austin a law partner and building the couple a made-to-order house, the Evergreens, on a lot next door to the Dickinson Homestead. A generous dowry from Susan's brothers helped furnish the Evergreens, a fashionable home with oak sideboards and a green marble fireplace adorned with Antonio Canova's sculpture Cupid and Psyche, Gothic chairs, and Victorian paintings.

Susan and Austin Dickinson had three children:

- Edward (Ned) Dickinson (1861–1898)
- Martha (Mattie or Mopsy) Dickinson (1866–1943)
- Thomas (Gib) Gilbert Dickinson (1875–1883)

== Public view of Susan ==
Susan Huntington Gilbert Dickinson was viewed as the "most graceful woman in Western Massachusetts", "astute and cosmopolitan", as well as "The Power", increasingly given to "frivolity, snobbery, and ruthlessness". She was known as a "sensitive editor" who was Emily Dickinson's "most responsive reader", a "remarkably perceptive... mentor of some standing" who supposedly refused to edit Emily's poems for publication.

She was affectionately called "Dollie" by Emily, and characterized as an "avalanche of Sun", a "breath from Gibraltar" uttering "impregnable syllables", "Domingo" in spirit, and "imagination" itself whose words are of "silver genealogy."

== Susan and Emily Dickinson ==
=== Epistolary relationship ===
One Sister have I in the house
And one a hedge away.
There’s only one recorded –
But both belong to me.

One came the road that I came –
And wore my last year’s gown –
The other, as a bird her nest
Builded our hearts among.

She did not sing as we did –
It was a different tune –
Herself to her a music
As Bumble bee of June.

Today is far from childhood,
But up and down the hills,
I held her hand the tighter –
Which shortened all the miles –

And still her hum
The years among,
Deceives the Butterfly;
And in her Eye
The Violets lie,
Mouldered this many May –

I spilt the dew,
But took the morn –
I chose this single star
From out the wide night’s numbers –
Sue – forevermore!

— Emily Dickinson

Emily Dickinson often described her love for Susan Huntington Gilbert Dickinson. In various letters, Emily compared her love for Susan to Dante's love for Beatrice, Swift's for Stella, and Mirabeau's for Sophie de Ruffey, and compared her tutelage with Susan to one with Shakespeare. Emily appears to have valued Susan's opinions about writing and reading. On Emily's "Safe in their Alabaster Chambers", Susan wrote that the first verse was so compelling that "I always go to the fire and get warm after thinking of it, but I never can again;" a few years later, Thomas Wentworth Higginson paraphrased Emily's critical commentary, echoing Susan's –"If I read a book [and] it makes my whole body so cold no fire ever can warm me I know that is poetry..."

The importance of Dickinson's relationship with Susan has widely been overlooked due to a point of view first promoted by Mabel Loomis Todd, who was involved for many years in a relationship with Austin Dickinson and who diminished Susan's role in Dickinson's life due to her own poor relationship with her lover's wife. However, the notion of a "cruel" Susan—as promoted by her romantic rival—has been questioned, most especially by Susan and Austin's surviving children, with whom Dickinson was close. Many scholars interpret the relationship between Emily and Susan as a romantic one. In The Emily Dickinson Journal Lena Koski observed that "Dickinson's letters to Gilbert express strong homoerotic feelings." She quotes from many of their letters, including one from 1852 in which Dickinson proclaims,

Susie, will you indeed come home next Saturday, and be my own again, and kiss me ... I hope for you so much, and feel so eager for you, feel that I cannot wait, feel that now I must have you—that the expectation once more to see your face again, makes me feel hot and feverish, and my heart beats so fast ... my darling, so near I seem to you, that I disdain this pen, and wait for a warmer language.

==== In popular culture ====
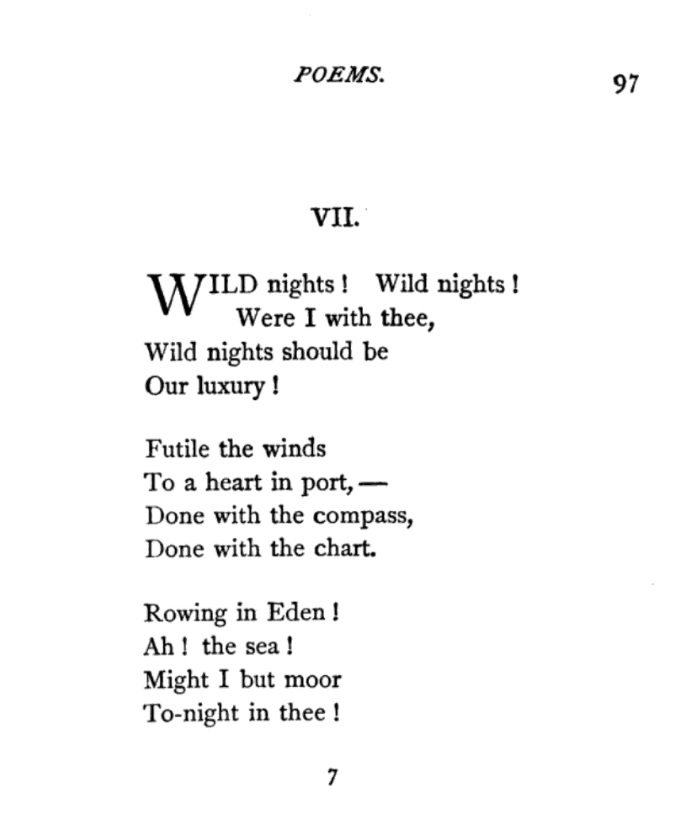
"Wild Nights – Wild Nights!" (here published as "VII") by Emily Dickinson. The movie, Wild Nights with Emily, is named after this piece.

The relationship between Emily and Susan is portrayed in the film Wild Nights with Emily and explored in the TV series Dickinson. Both depictions were heavily influenced by the research of Martha Nell Smith, one of the first scholars to theorize that Susan was the love of Emily's life.

=== Emily's death ===
According to Dickinson scholar Martha Nell Smith,

Susan's enactment of simple ritual for profound utterance is perhaps best displayed in the simple flannel robe she designed and in which she dressed Emily for death, laying her out in a white casket, cypripedium and violets (symbolizing faithfulness) at her neck, two heliotropes (symbolizing devotion) in her hand. This final act over Emily's body underscores "their shared life, their deep and complex intimacy" and that they both anticipated a "postmortem resurrection" of that intimacy. Besides swaddling her beloved friend's body for burial, Susan penned Emily's obituary, a loving portrayal of a strong, brilliant woman, devoted to family and to her neighbors, and to her writing, for which she had the most serious objectives and highest ambitions. Though "weary and sick" at the loss of her dearest friend, Susan produced a piece so powerful that Higginson wanted to use it as the introduction to the 1890 Poems [indeed, it did serve as the outline for Todd's introduction to the second volume of Poems in 1891]. Susan concludes the obituary pointing readers' attentions to Emily as writer, and to the fact that her words would live on. Among her daughter Martha's papers is evidence that these same four lines were used again in a Dickinson ceremony, perhaps to conclude Susan's own funeral:

Morns like these we parted;
Noons like these she rose,
Fluttering first, then firmer,
To her fair repose.

== Publications ==
=== Susan Dickinson's work ===
Susan Dickinson wrote essays, reviews, journals, poems, letters, and memorials constantly throughout her life. She also produced commonplace books and scrapbooks of her own publications in the Springfield Republican, as well as of clippings about admired figures such as Queen Victoria.

She published several stories in the Springfield Republican—"A Hole in Haute Society" (August 2, 1908), "The Passing of Zoroaster" (March 1910), and "The Circus Eighty Years Ago" (early 1900s). In January 1903, writing from Rome, Susan published a lengthy review of "Harriet Prescott's [Spofford] Early Work" as a letter to the editor of the Republican. Arguing for republication of Spofford's early work, she quotes "my sister-in-law, Emily Dickinson" as an authority, reiterating the latter's delighted reader's response—"That is the only thing I ever saw in my life I did not think I could have written myself. You stand nearer the world than I do. Send me everything she writes"—and quoting Dickinson's declaration, "for love is stronger than death", in her own critique of Prescott's "Circumstance". In Annals of the Evergreens, a typescript that was not published until the 1980s, Susan praises Prescott's "Pomegranate Flowers" at the outset, then proceeds to describe an Evergreens life rich in cultural exchange, reading Elizabeth Barrett and Robert Browning, Thomas de Quincey, Julia Ward Howe, Thomas Carlyle, and Shakespeare, and entertaining many distinguished visitors—Ralph Waldo Emerson, Harriet Beecher Stowe, abolitionist Wendell Phillips, landscape designer Frederick Olmsted.

=== Susan's involvement with Emily's publications ===
Susan Dickinson was criticized for not seeing Emily's poems published. In the 1890 letter to Higginson, Susan described how she had imagined a volume of Emily's writings with "many bits of her prose-passages from early letters quite surpassing the correspondence of Gunderodi[e] with Bettine [von Arnim] [a romantic friendship celebrated by Goethe]. . . [using] quaint bits to my children. . . Of course I should have forestalled criticism by only printing them."

In a March 1891 letter to Ward, she elaborated on her vision for such a volume which would also include Emily's "illustrations", "showing her witty humorous side, which has all been left out" of the 1890 Poems. Susan's outline for the volume shows that she would not have divided the poems into the conventional categories of "Life", "Love", "Time and Eternity", and "Nature" but would have emphasized poetry's integration with quotidian experience.

== Poetry ==
=== Susan's poems ===
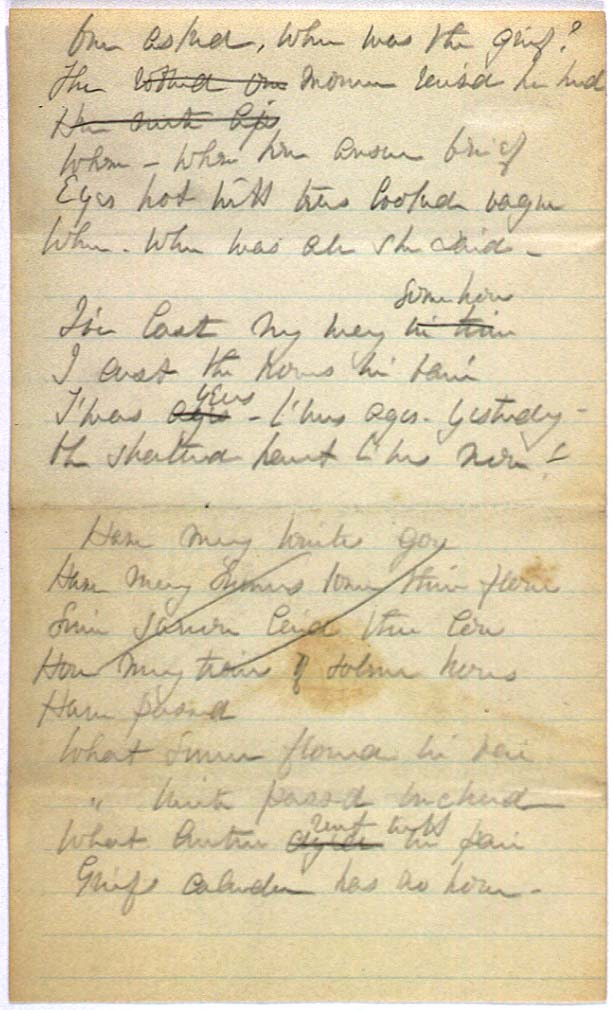
Susan Dickinson's handwritten manuscript of her poem "One asked, when was the grief." The poem was likely written after the death of her youngest son Thomas (Gib) Gilbert Dickinson. Courtesy of Writings by Susan Dickinson

Besides publishing critical pieces and stories, Susan published at least one poem, "Love's Reckoning", in the Republican, and wrote quite a few others:

- “One asked, when was the grief?”
- "I'm waiting but she comes not back"
- "The Sun always kept low"
- “The days when smiles over tears will prevail”
- “When death with his white fingers”
- "There are the autumn days of the Spring"
- “Hyssop”
- “Amor”
- “Of June, and her belongings”
- “Irony” (or “Crushed before the Moth”)
- “Minstrel of the passing days”
- “Valentines Day” (H Box 9)

Drafts of her "Oh" and "A Dirge" ("Feb/95") are recorded in her Florentine commonplace book. Though more conventional in form than Emily's, Susan's poems attend to many of the same subjects–"There are autumn days of the Spring" distinctly echoes both "These are the days when Birds come back" and "The Crickets / sang / And set the / Sun", and "The Sun kept low as an oven" recalls the "Stooping as low as the / kitchen window – " of "Blazing in Gold – and / Quenching – in Purple!" and "The sun kept stooping – stooping – low." Their correspondence was a creative wellspring for Susan as well as for Emily—on Susan's copy of "The Crickets / sang / And Set the / Sun" are several lines of Susan's response to Emily's work, recounting a few lines from Milton's "Comus":

I was all ear
and took in strains that
might create a seal
under the ribs of death

Where John Milton had written "create a soul", Susan wrote "create a seal", perhaps because she was recalling the lines from memory or revising them a bit. And, upside down, Susan added a few lines from Scott's Redgauntlet:

Despair is treason
towards man
and blasphemy
to heaven.

=== Natural and spiritual inspiration ===
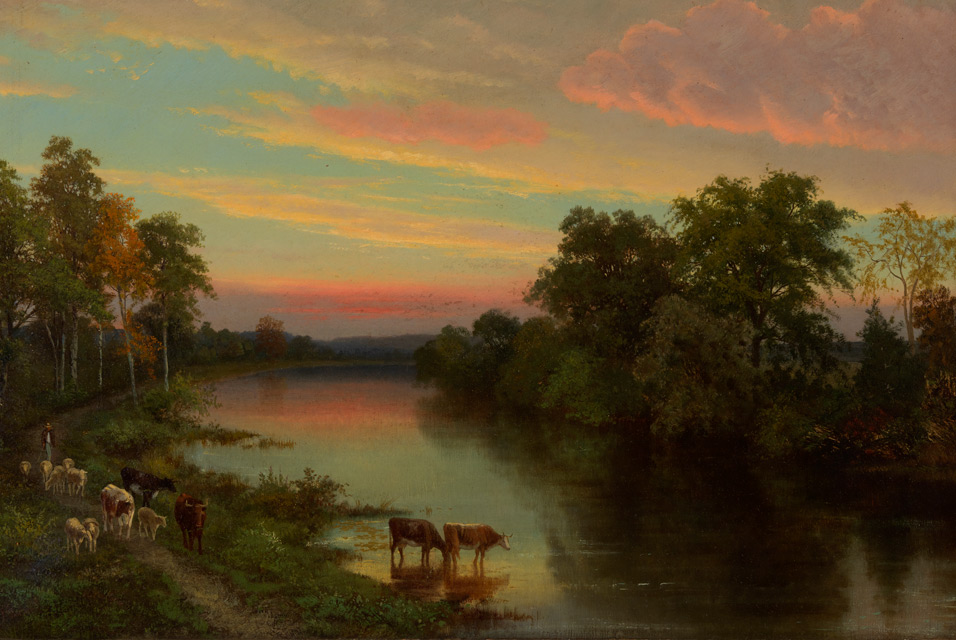
John Frederick Kensett, Sunset with Cows, 1856. Oil on canvas, Emily Dickinson Museum

Susan Dickinson's writing suggests she had a profound appreciation of nature. She favored landscape paintings depicting the splendors of the natural world. In the Evergreens, John F. Kensett's Sunset with Cows (1856) bears Susan's name on the back, and in one of her manuscript poems, she wrote -"I'm waiting but the cows not back."

Late in her life, Susan turned increasingly to the rituals of High Church and considered becoming a Roman Catholic. In the 1880s, she spent almost every Sabbath for six years establishing a Sunday school in Logtown, a poor village in present-day Belchertown not far from Amherst.
