= Lavinia Norcross Dickinson =

Younger sister of American poet Emily Dickinson

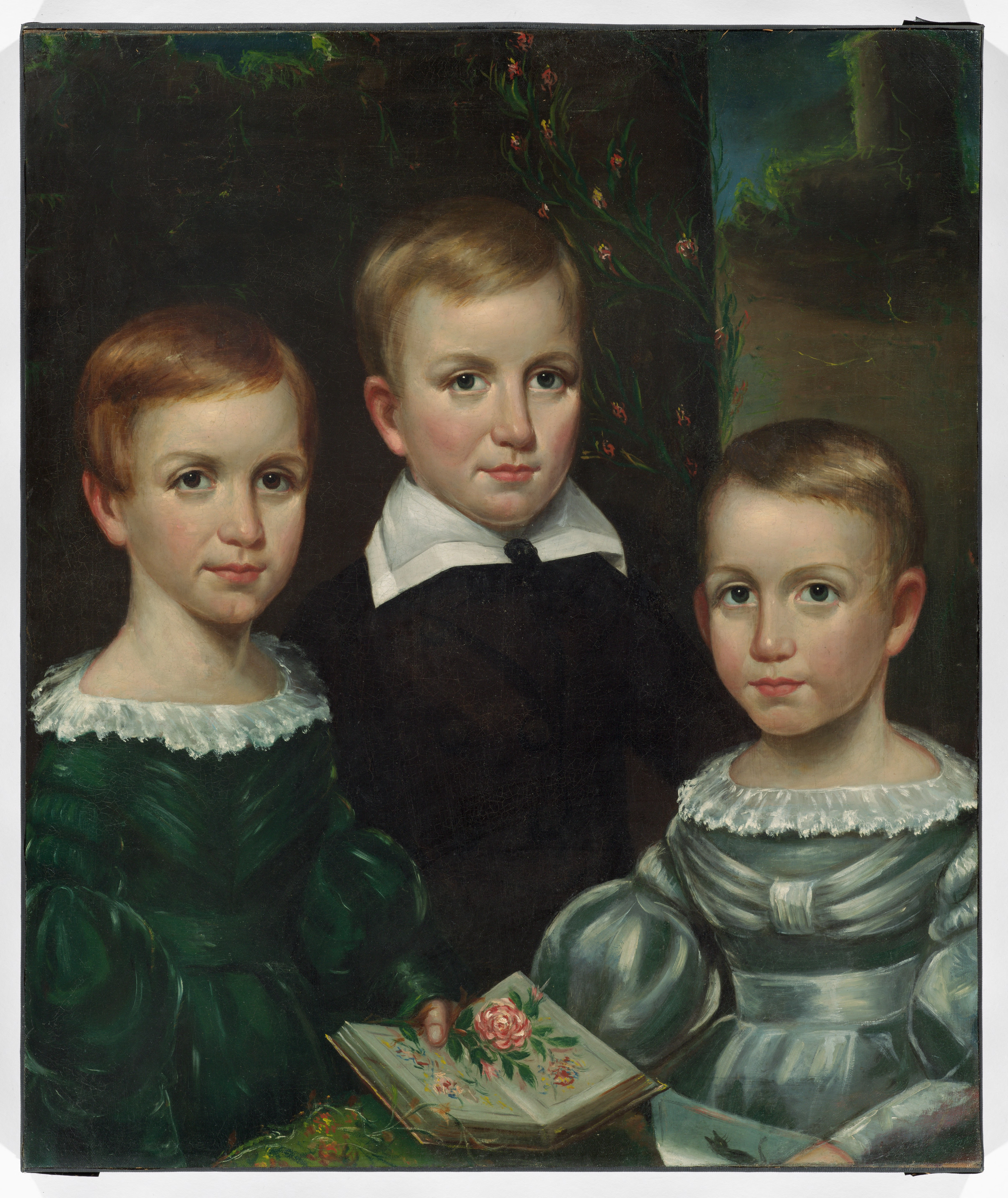
- The Dickinson children (Lavinia on the right), c. 1840
- Born: February 28, 1833; Amherst, Massachusetts, U.S.
- Died: August 31, 1899 (aged 66); Amherst, Massachusetts, U.S.
- Parent(s): Edward Dickinson; Emily Norcross Dickinson
- Relatives: William Austin Dickinson (brother); Emily Dickinson (sister)

Lavinia "Vinnie" Norcross Dickinson (February 28, 1833 – August 31, 1899) was the younger sister of American poet Emily Dickinson.

Vinnie was the youngest of the Dickinson siblings born to Edward Dickinson and his wife Emily Norcross in Amherst, Massachusetts. She shared a name with her Aunt Lavinia. On September 7, 1840, Vinnie and her sister Emily started attending school at Amherst Academy, a former boys' school that had opened to female students just two years earlier.

Vinnie was instrumental in achieving the posthumous publication of her sister's poems after having discovered the forty-odd manuscripts in which Emily had collected her work. Despite promising her sister that she would destroy all correspondence and personal papers, Vinnie sought to have her sister's poetry edited and published by two of Emily's personal correspondents, Thomas Wentworth Higginson and Mabel Loomis Todd. Four years after Emily Dickinson's death, in 1890, Poems was published by Roberts Brothers, Boston. By the end of 1892, it had already been through eleven editions.

Vinnie never married and remained at the Dickinson Homestead until her death.

== In popular culture ==
- In Apple TV+'s 2019–2021 series Dickinson, Anna Baryshnikov plays Dickinson in a comedic interpretation.
- In the 2016 film A Quiet Passion, Lavinia is played by Jennifer Ehle.
