= William Austin Dickinson =

American lawyer

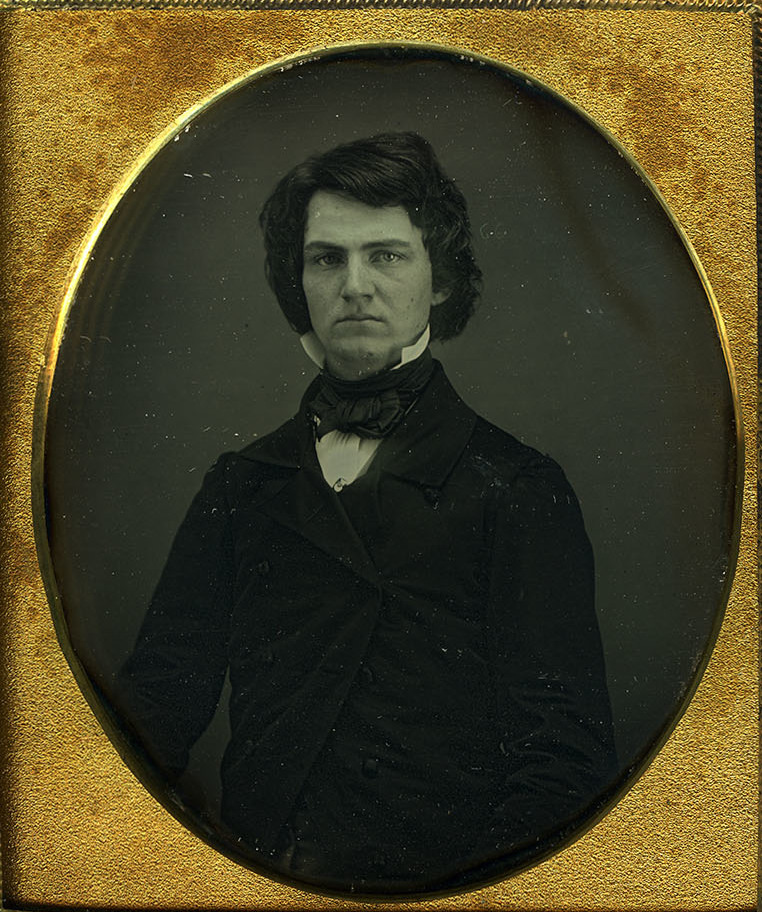
- Dickinson c. 1850s
- Born: William Austin Dickinson; April 16, 1829; Amherst, Massachusetts, US
- Died: August 16, 1895 (aged 66); Amherst, Massachusetts, US
- Resting place: Wildwood Cemetery
- Education: Harvard Law School; Amherst College; Williston Northampton School
- Occupation: Lawyer
- Spouse: Susan Huntington Gilbert Dickinson
- Children: 3
- Parents: Edward Dickinson; Emily Norcross Dickinson
- Family: Emily Dickinson (sister); Lavinia Norcross Dickinson (sister)

William Austin Dickinson (April 16, 1829 – August 16, 1895) was an American lawyer who lived and worked in Amherst, Massachusetts. Known to family and friends as "Austin", he was, notably, the older brother of poet Emily Dickinson.

After graduating from both Williston Seminary and Amherst College, where he was a member of the Alpha Delta Phi, Dickinson taught briefly before pursuing a legal education. He attended Harvard Law School, then joined his father, Edward Dickinson, in his law practice. After his father's death, Austin became treasurer of Amherst College from 1873 until his death. In addition to his law practice and treasury work, Dickinson took part in numerous civic projects and responsibilities, such as moderating the town meetings from 1881 until his death, and acting as president of the Village Improvement Association. He was responsible for getting Frederick Law Olmsted to design the Amherst Common, and was instrumental in the development of Wildwood Cemetery in Amherst.

On July 1, 1856, Dickinson married Susan Huntington Gilbert, a friend of his sister Emily from childhood. They had three children and resided at the Evergreens, which stood, and still stands, adjacent to the Dickinson Homestead in downtown Amherst. Aside from his connection to his world-famous sister, Emily, Austin is also known for his longtime affair with Mabel Loomis Todd, a young Amherst College faculty wife who would eventually edit the first few collections of Emily Dickinson's poetry.

Austin is buried in the cemetery he helped found, Wildwood Cemetery, as is Mabel Loomis Todd, in a separate family plot. Emily Dickinson is not buried at Wildwood, but at Amherst West Cemetery.

Austin and Susan Dickinson's home, largely intact since they died, can be visited through the Emily Dickinson Museum.
