= Edward Dickinson =

American politician

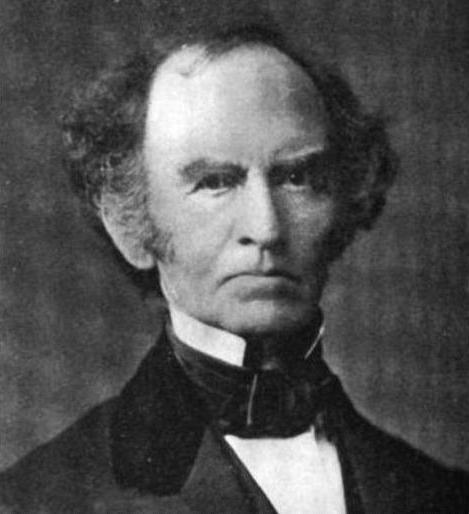

Member of the U.S. House of Representatives from Massachusetts's 10th district
- In office March 4, 1853 – March 3, 1855
- Preceded by: Zeno Scudder
- Succeeded by: Calvin C. Chaffee

Personal details
- Born: January 1, 1803 Amherst, Massachusetts, U.S.
- Died: June 16, 1874 (aged 71) Boston, Massachusetts, U.S.
- Party: Whig
- Spouse: Emily Norcross Dickinson
- Children: Austin, Emily, Lavinia
- Education: Yale College; Northampton Law School
- Occupation: Lawyer

Edward Dickinson (January 1, 1803 – June 16, 1874) was an American politician from Massachusetts. He is also known as the father of the poet Emily Dickinson; their family home in Amherst, the Emily Dickinson Museum, is a museum dedicated to her.

== Life and career ==
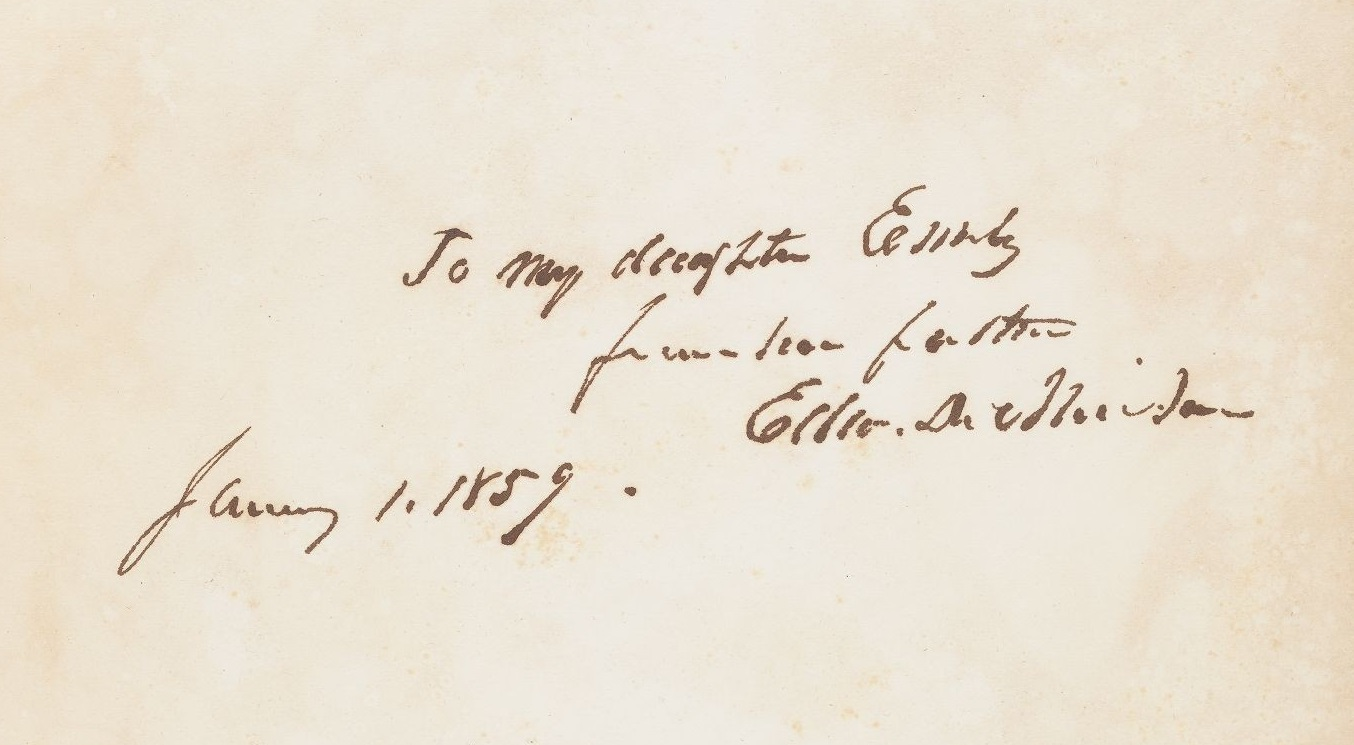
Signature of Edward Dickinson in a book given to his daughter Emily, 1859

Dickinson, the eldest son of Hon. Samuel Fowler Dickinson and Lucretia (Gunn) Dickinson, was born in Amherst, Massachusetts, where he attended public schools and the Amherst Academy. He graduated from Yale College in 1823 and studied at Northampton Law School in Northampton, Massachusetts. He was admitted to the bar and commenced law practice in Amherst in 1826. On May 6, 1828, he married Emily Norcross Dickinson (1804–1882); they had three children: William Austin, Emily Elizabeth, and Lavinia Norcross.

Dickinson served as treasurer of Amherst College from 1835 until 1873. He received an honorary LL.D. from Amherst in 1863.

He served in the Massachusetts House of Representatives 1838–1839 and in the Massachusetts Senate from 1842 to 1843. He was a member of the Massachusetts Governor's Council in 1846 and 1847.

He was then elected as a Whig to the United States Congress 1853–1855 and subsequently declined candidacy for the Republican nomination of Lieutenant Governor in 1861 before returning to the Massachusetts House of Representatives in 1873. He was elected for the main purpose of securing to the town the advantages of the Massachusetts Central Railroad.

On the morning of June 16, 1874, after a careful speech in the House on his connection with the Hoosac Tunnel, he suffered an apoplexy and died at his hotel before evening. He is buried in Amherst's West Cemetery.

== See also ==
- 1874 Massachusetts legislature

U.S. House of Representatives
Preceded by Zeno Scudder	Member of the U.S. House of Representatives from Massachusetts's 10th congressional district March 4, 1853 – March 3, 1855	Succeeded by Calvin C. Chaffee
