= Edward J. Lawrence =

Last surviving six-masted schooner

History

United States
- Name: Edward J. Lawrence
- Namesake: Edward Jones Lawrence
- Builder: Percy & Small Shipyard
- Launched: April 2, 1908
- In service: 1908
- Out of service: 1925
- Home port: Portland, Maine
- Fate: Sunk on December 27, 1925

General characteristics
- Type: Schooner
- Tonnage: 3,350 GRT
- Length: 320.2 ft (97.6 m)
- Beam: 50 ft (15 m)
- Depth of hold: 29 ft (8.8 m)
- Installed power: Donkey engine for shipboard auxiliary functions
- Propulsion: Sail
- Sail plan: Six-masted gaff-rig with foresails

Edward J. Lawrence was an American wooden six-masted schooner launched in 1908 by the Percy & Small Shipyard in Bath, Maine. Edward J. Lawrence was the last survivor of ten six-masted schooners built between 1900 and 1909, with the ship consumed by flames in 1925 while moored off Portland, Maine, as thousands of spectators took in the spectacle according to a report at the time.

== Description ==
Built for the Portland-based fleet operator J.S. Winslow Co. and named for a Maine philanthropist who made his fortune from cotton and lumber mills, Edward J. Lawrence was the fourth largest schooner built by Percy & Small as ranked by gross tonnage, after Wyoming, the largest wooden ship ever built; Edward B. Winslow, launched the same year as Edward J. Lawrence; and Eleanor A. Percy.

Like other Percy & Small schooners, Edward J. Lawrence was designed to capitalize on coal trade between ports of the East Coast of the United States, with the wood schooners relatively inexpensive to build and operate compared to steamships. But the extreme length of the six-masted schooners subjected hulls to stresses in rough seas, compromising seams and caulking as hulls flexed along their lengths.

Percy & Small equipped the schooners it built with steam-powered donkey engines to operate bilge pumps and hoist the heavy sails up masts.

As the case with other six-masted schooners built in Maine, Edward J. Lawrence saw limited service during World War I with transatlantic voyages carrying military or supply cargoes.

== History ==
Edward J. Lawrence was launched at Percy & Small on April 2, 1908, with William Kreger an early shipmaster for the schooner under J.S. Winslow ownership.

On June 16, 1909, Edward J. Lawrence went aground at Cross Rip Shoals off Nantucket, while en route to Portland with coal loaded at Norfolk, Virginia, but floated free afterward with the assistance of a tugboat.

During Kreger's tenure, Edward J. Lawrence went aground on two other occasions without significant damage, and struck a ledge in another incident. On October 13, 1913, the ship sailed through a nor'easter off Cape Cod, taking on seven feet of water in its hold and listing during the storm, then dropping anchor to ride out the worst of it. Three months later in January 1914, Edward J. Lawrence again sailed through a major storm that claimed Grace A. Martin and Fuller Palmer, two other Percy & Small-built schooners.

The combined effect of the storms and groundings of Edward J. Lawrence is thought to have produced hogging in the hull that compromised the ship's seaworthiness.

Under a new shipmaster named Frank H. Peterson, Edward J. Lawrence again dodged disaster after delivering a load of artillery shell casings to the port of La Pallice, France. Departing port alongside another Percy & Small-built schooner called Carl F. Cressy, the two ships sailed southwest, initially under the watch of French gunboats which eventually turned back to the Bay of Biscay. With a radio on board Edward J. Lawrence, Peterson received a night-time alert of a U-boat operating some 60 miles distant on the course the ships were sailing. Peterson set a new tack to the northeast, but with Carl F. Cressy lacking a radio was unable to warn his counterpart. Carl F. Cressy was sunk by SM U-93 the following day on August 23, 1917.

On an unknown date, South Portland native and shipmaster Joseph H. York was installed as shipmaster of Edward J. Lawrence, with York having captained George W. Wells, the first six-masted schooner built on the East Coast; and Thomas W. Lawson, the only seven-masted schooner ever built, which had a steel hull.

York was in command of George W. Wells when it was stranded on September 3, 1913, near Hatteras Inlet. York triggered a U.S. Department of the Treasury inquiry after claiming members of the United States Life-Saving Service had offered to purchase the wreck with an eye on profiting in violation of federal rules, which was not substantiated subsequently.

In 1925, Edward J. Lawrence remained in Portland Harbor during a contractual dispute over a tugboat company's claim for nonpayment of invoices owed, with U.S. Marshals ultimately impounding the vessel with the intent to auction it for the benefit of the claimants.

About 11 a.m. on December 26, 1925, a fire broke out on board, with an illegal liquor still thought to have been the cause of the blaze. The South Portland Historical Society has a newspaper clipping in its archives with a photograph captioned "Battling To Save The Edward J. Lawrence" by an unspecified publisher, that shows three vessels alongside the burning schooner during the attempt to extinguish the fire: an unidentified fireboat, the U.S. Coast Guard cutter Ossipee, and the steam tugboat Cumberland.

A Boston Globe correspondent reported the decision to beach Edward J. Lawrence on a reef off Fort Gorges in Portland Harbor, and described the fire as "the most spectacular for years" with the 320-foot length of the ship and its masts "fringed with flame". Thousands of onlookers watched the fire and efforts to extinguish it, according to the report.

== Present day ==
Maine Maritime Museum lists more than 40 artifacts in its archives and collections related to Edward J. Lawrence, including ship records. Photographs in the collection include shots of Edward J. Lawrence at sea and in ports including Barcelona and Buenos Aires; individual crew members; and the fire and ship's rudder which washed ashore afterward. The collection also includes ship components salvaged from the wreck in Portland Harbor.

Other papers related to Edward J. Lawrence are archived by the National Archives and Records Administration and Mystic Seaport Museum in Connecticut.

At low tide, hull ribs are visible close to the surface at a point of Portland Harbor in the vicinity of Fort Gorges and Little Diamond Island, that are believed to be part of the wreck of the Edward J. Lawrence.

The National Oceanic and Atmospheric Administration's chart for Casco Bay marks a shipwreck just north of Fort Gorges and west of Little Diamond Island.
