= Eleanor Percy =

Eleanor Percy may refer to:

== People ==
- Eleanor Neville, Countess of Northumberland (c. 1398–1472), who married secondly Henry Percy, 2nd Earl of Northumberland, and was mother of the 3rd Earl
- Eleanor Poynings (c. 1422 – 1484), who married in 1435 Henry Percy, 3rd Earl of Northumberland, and had a daughter Eleanor Percy (1455 – c. 1477)
- Eleanor Percy, Duchess of Buckingham (c. 1474 – 1530), daughter of Henry Percy, 4th Earl of Northumberland
- Eleanor Percy, Duchess of Northumberland (1820–1911)
- Eleanor M. (Golder) Percy, mother of Samuel Rogers Percy Jr. who founded Percy & Small Shipyard in 1894
- Eleanor A. Percy, a 1900 ship built by Percy & Small

== See also ==
- Eleanor Percy Lee (born Eleanor Percy Ware, 1819–1849), was an American writer
