= Cora F. Cressey =

- U.S. National Register of Historic Places
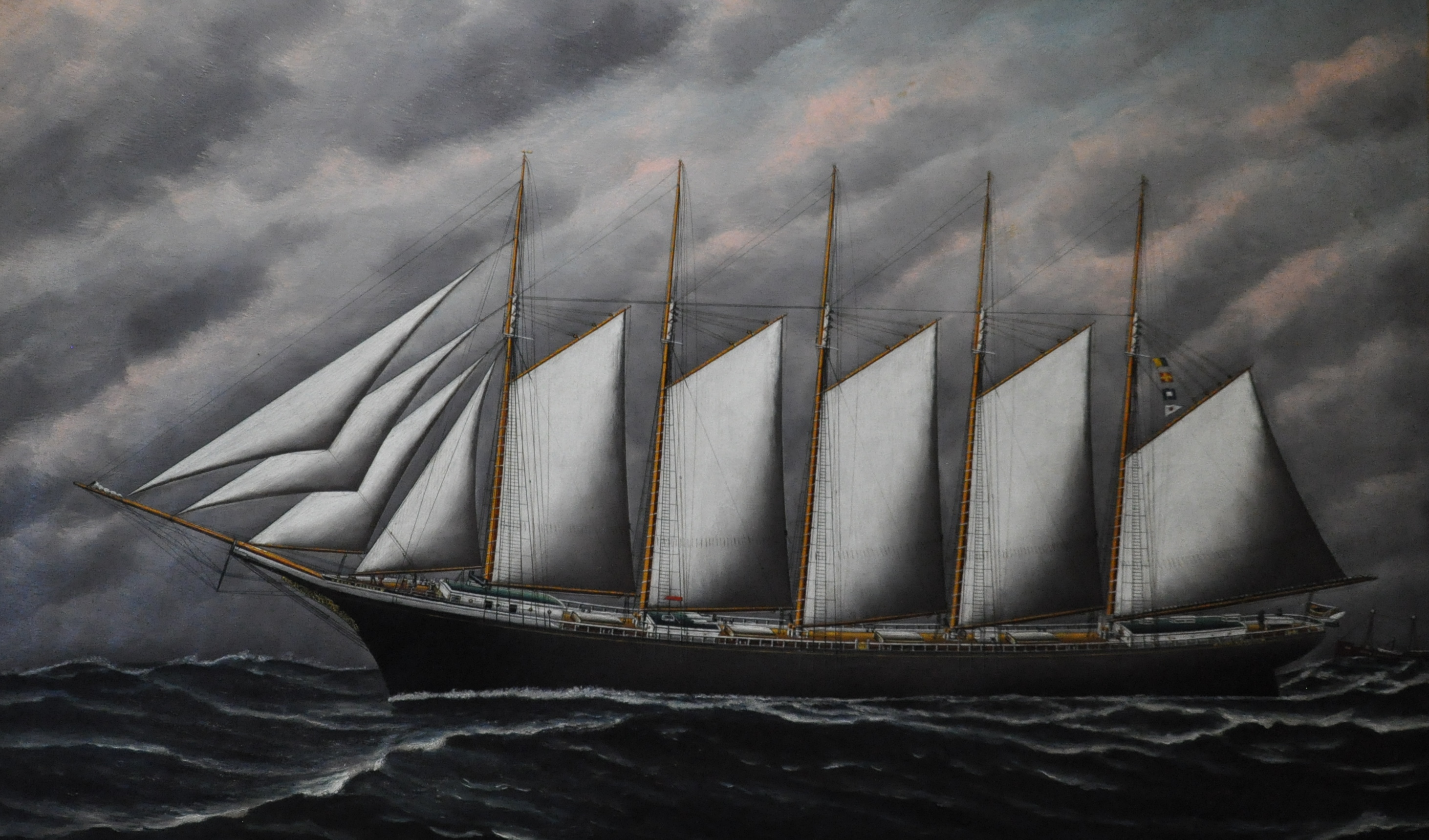
- Painting of the Cora F. Cressey by Solon Badger

- Location within Maine Location within the United States
- Location: Keene Narrows, Bremen, Maine
- Coordinates: 43°59′4″N 69°24′54″W
- Area: 0.1 acres (0.040 ha)
- Built: 1902
- Architect: Percy and Small Shipyard
- NRHP reference No.: 90000586
- Added to NRHP: April 18, 1990

The Cora F. Cressey was a five masted 273 feet (83 m) wooden-hulled freight schooner operating in the coasting trade along the east coast of the United States. Built in 1902, it served in that trade until 1928. After serving for a time as a floating nightclub, its hulk was towed to the Keene Narrows in Bremen, Maine, where it was scuttled to serve as a breakwater for a lobster operation. Despite its deteriorating condition, the hulk is one of the largest surviving wooden hulls in the United States. It was listed on the National Register of Historic Places in 1990.

== Description ==
Cora F. Cressey was built in 1902 at the Percy and Small Shipyard (now the campus of the Maine Maritime Museum) in Bath, Maine. As built, she was a five-masted schooner, 273 feet (83 m) long, with a beam of 45.4 feet (13.8 m) and a hold depth of 27.9 feet (8.5 m). The hull was not diagonally braced, but did have iron belts for reinforcement. She had a registered capacity of 2499 gross tons and 2089 net tons. She was fitted with two decks and had a typical crew complement of eleven. She had a small steam donkey engine for raising anchors and sails, but not propulsion.

== Operational history ==
Cora F. Cressey was primarily engaged in transporting coal along the eastern seaboard of the United States from southern ports to the north. Her high bow is credited with helping her survive a gale in 1924 that caused the Wyoming, the largest schooner ever built, to sink. In service until 1928, she was converted for use as a floating nightclub in Boston in 1929. Later she was towed to Gloucester, Massachusetts and Providence, Rhode Island in the same role.

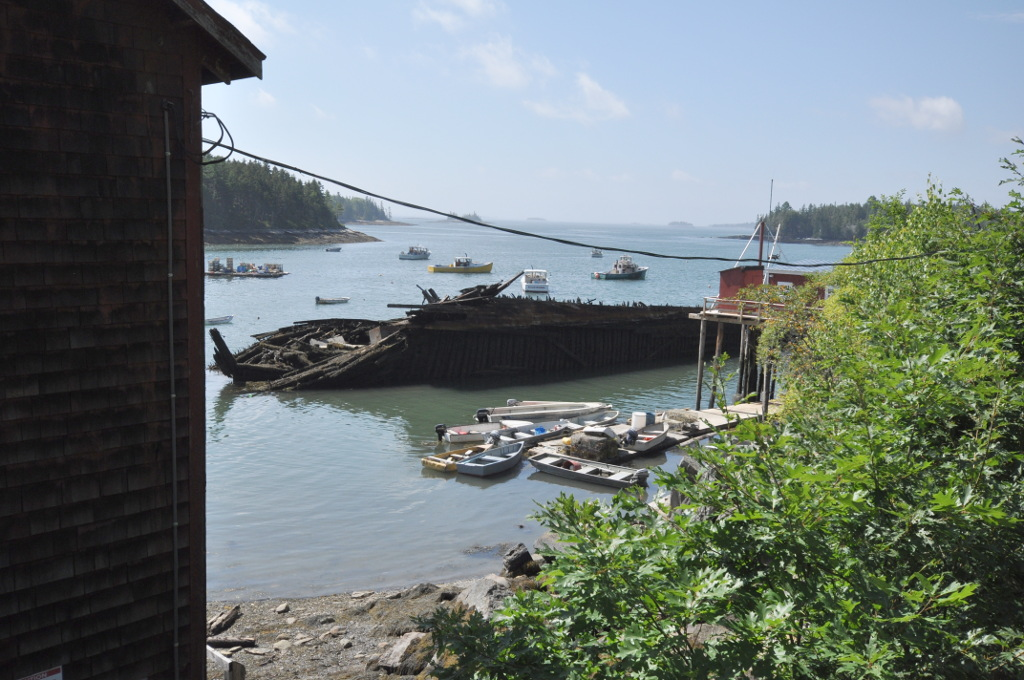
The hulk at rest in Keene Narrows, 2018

In 1938 her masts were removed and she was purchased by the owner of a lobster operation in Bremen, Maine. She was towed to the Keene Narrows, between the mainland and Oar Island, and partially filled with sand to serve as a lobster pound. Holes were cut in her hull in an unsuccessful bid to improve circulation, and she ended up acting as a breakwater for lobster pens set between her and the shore. In 1988, a 40-foot (12 m) section of her hull fell off. Portions of her fixtures and equipment were removed prior to her use as a breakwater, and survive as display items at the Maine Maritime Museum.

== Significance ==
The badly deteriorating hulk of Cora F. Cressey is one of the largest surviving wooden hulls in the United States. Due to the structural limitations of wooden construction, ships of this size were often leaky, and could not withstand the stresses of heavy weather and sustained hard sailing. Although the largest had up to seven masts, sail power put them at a competitive disadvantage with steam-powered vessels, which could make passage more reliably. There are no known surviving six- or seven-masted wooden schooner hulls.

== See also ==
- National Register of Historic Places listings in Lincoln County, Maine
- Hesper and Luther Little - two other Maine schooners that were abandoned in the 1930s.
