= Cornell Computing and Information Science =

Academic unit at Cornell University in Ithaca, New York, US

Coordinates: 42°26′42″N 76°28′51″W

Cornell University Ann S. Bowers College of Computing and Information Science
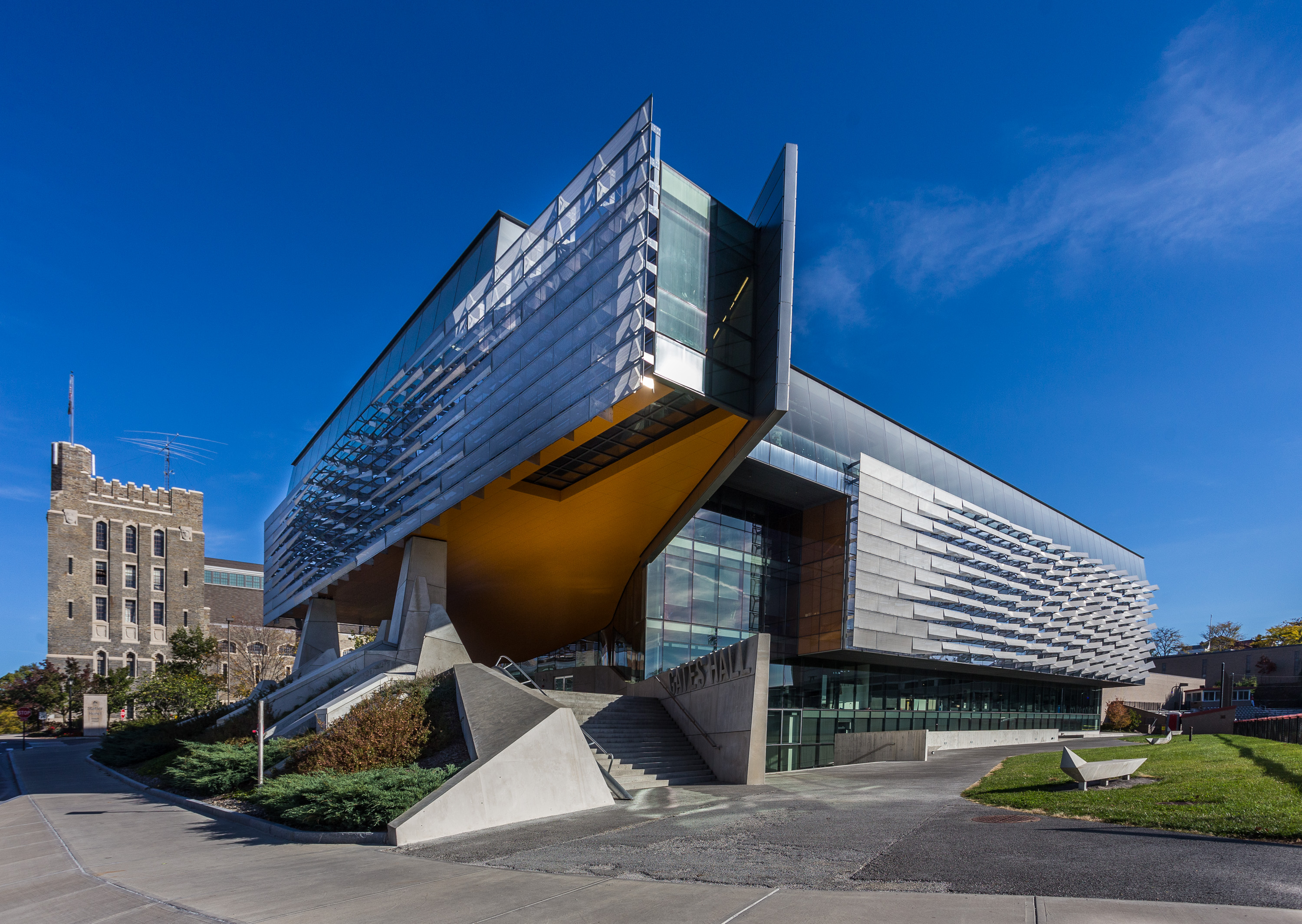
- Bill & Melinda Gates Hall
- Other name: Cornell Bowers
- Former names: Faculty of Computing and Information Science (1999–2020)
- Type: Private
- Established: 1999 (as faculty); 2020 (as college)
- Affiliations: Cornell University
- Dean: Sorin Lerner
- Faculty: 71 (computer science); 42 (information science); About 20 (statistics and data science)
- Undergraduates: About 2,400 (2024)
- Location: Ithaca, New York, U.S.
- Website: bowers.cornell.edu

The Cornell University Ann S. Bowers College of Computing and Information Science (formerly the Faculty of Computing and Information Science from 1999 to 2020), also known as Cornell Bowers or Cornell Computing and Information Science, is a tri-department unit at Cornell University in Ithaca, New York. It comprises the departments of Computer Science, Information Science, and Statistics and Data Science, and participates in the multicollege departments of Computational Biology and Design Tech.

According to Cornell computer science professor David Gries in 2015, "essentially it's a college without students," with students instead being admitted to, and coming from, three of Cornell's regular undergraduate schools: the Cornell David A. Duffield College of Engineering, the College of Arts and Sciences, and the College of Agriculture and Life Sciences. A variety of degree programs are offered through the college, depending upon the department within the college and the originating college the student is in; the degrees granted include Bachelor of Arts and Bachelor of Science; Master of Science, Master of Engineering, and Master of Professional Studies; and PhD. In addition, students from any of Cornell's undergraduate colleges can minor in computer science, information science, statistics, or artificial intelligence.

== History ==
Cornell established its Department of Computer Science in 1965, with Juris Hartmanis as founding chair; it was among the first such departments in the world. Two of its faculty members later received the Turing Award: John Hopcroft in 1986 and Hartmanis in 1993.

=== Faculty of Computing and Information Science ===
The college came out of the Faculty of Computing and Information Science, which was established in 1999 to unify computer science-related efforts throughout the university. The initiative, done under the university presidency of Hunter R. Rawlings III, overcame early opposition from many professors in both the Engineering and Arts schools. The new faculty's first dean was Robert L. Constable, a longtime professor of computer science at Cornell who specialized in connecting computer programs with mathematical proof systems. The idea of the entity, which Constable had been one of the primary advocates for, was to elevate computer science from the department level to the college level; this was seen as critical given the field's increasingly widespread importance to nearly every area of study at the university. Furthermore, the information science side of the faculty would focus on how computer-related technology was affecting society and the world.

In 2005, the Department of Statistical Science was incorporated into the faculty. In 2019 it was reorganized as the multicollege Department of Statistics and Data Science, shared with the College of Agriculture and Life Sciences and the ILR School; that year the faculty also joined the College of Agriculture and Life Sciences in establishing a Department of Computational Biology. A $25 million donation from the Bill & Melinda Gates Foundation in 2006 led to the construction of the building named after the couple, which opened in 2014. Designed by Thom Mayne of Morphosis at a cost of $60 million, Gates Hall brought the computer science and information science departments under one roof; Bill Gates dedicated it on October 1, 2014. Other CIS facilities include Rhodes Hall, as well as Malott Hall.

Constable would remain as the faculty's dean for ten years. When he stepped down from the post, Provost Biddy Martin said that Constable had succeeded in giving computing reach into areas as different as architecture, history, plant science, and psychology. In 2009 he was succeeded as dean by Daniel P. Huttenlocher. Huttenlocher had chaired the 1998 university task force that led to the faculty's creation.

According to Cornell professors and administrators, the Faculty of Computing and Information Science was a "pioneer" in devising this structure, and other universities have since emulated aspects of it. In particular, other institutions began tying computer science and information science more closely together. Huttenlocher took the interdisciplinary approach of the Faculty of Computing and Information Science to his next position as founding dean of Cornell Tech in 2012, and then in the late 2010s he became the first dean of the MIT Schwarzman College of Computing at the Massachusetts Institute of Technology, which also took an interdisciplinary perspective that stressed the impacts of computing technology on society.

As an example of how the Faculty of Computing and Information Science emphasized the value of multidisciplinary studies, one initiative of the faculty was to support double majors between computer science and a variety of other subjects in any of the Arts, Engineering, or Agriculture schools. This proved successful in increasing the number of women who were computer science majors. Indeed, by 2020 some 43 percent of students majoring in CIS were female, a figure well above typical for the United States. The final dean of the faculty was Kavita Bala, who had been chair of the department of computer science and was named to the position in 2020. When the college was created later that year, she became its first dean.

=== Formation of the college ===
Creation of the college came in December 2020 with a more-than-$100 million donation from Ann S. Bowers. Bowers, a liberal arts alumna of Cornell, had been the head of personnel at Intel during a period of rapid growth in the early 1970s; subsequently married Robert Noyce, the cofounder of Intel; was vice president for human resources at Apple Computer in the early 1980s; and later became a philanthropist who chaired the Noyce Foundation following her husband's death. She had frequently donated to Cornell in the past.

In summer 2025, a new four-story, 135,000-square-foot building opened. The building was partially funded by a $10 million donation from the two founders of Wayfair, both Cornell alumni, as well as from Bowers. The new structure was designed by Leers Weinzapfel Associates and was built adjacent to Gates Hall, with green space located in between to form a mini-quad. Construction was on the site of Hoy Field, the longtime varsity baseball team diamond (which was to be relocated farther out from the central campus, at some loss of convenience and tradition). The new building is intended to help handle a sixfold increase in computer and information science enrollments during the previous decade.

Graduate student programs in the college take place both in Ithaca and at the Cornell Tech campus in New York City.

By 2022 there were 62 full-time faculty members in the Department of Computer Science, with 49 in Ithaca and 13 in New York City. There were 42 full-time faculty in the Department of Information Science, and 18 tenure or tenure-track positions in the Department of Statistics and Data Science. By 2022, there were 2,000 students taking majors in the college, and 76 percent of all undergraduate students were taking at least one course in CIS. The college is located in Bill & Melinda Gates Hall near the Engineering Quad on the Cornell Central Campus in Ithaca, New York.

Kavita Bala served as the college's inaugural dean from 2020 until her appointment as Cornell's 17th provost, announced in September 2024; her five-year term as provost began on January 1, 2025. Thorsten Joachims, a professor of computer science and information science, then served as interim dean. Sorin Lerner, previously chair of the Department of Computer Science and Engineering at the University of California, San Diego, became dean on November 1, 2025, for a five-year term.

== Rankings ==
Cornell has long had one of the top-ranked computer science programs in the nation. It placed in a tie for sixth overall in the U.S. News & World Report Best Colleges Rankings for 2022, with specialty rankings of third in theory, third in programming languages, tied for fifth in artificial intelligence, and twelfth in computer systems.

Cornell ranked in a tie for thirteenth in statistics in the same 2022 rankings.
