= Windjammer =

Commercial sailing ship with multiple masts and rig configurations

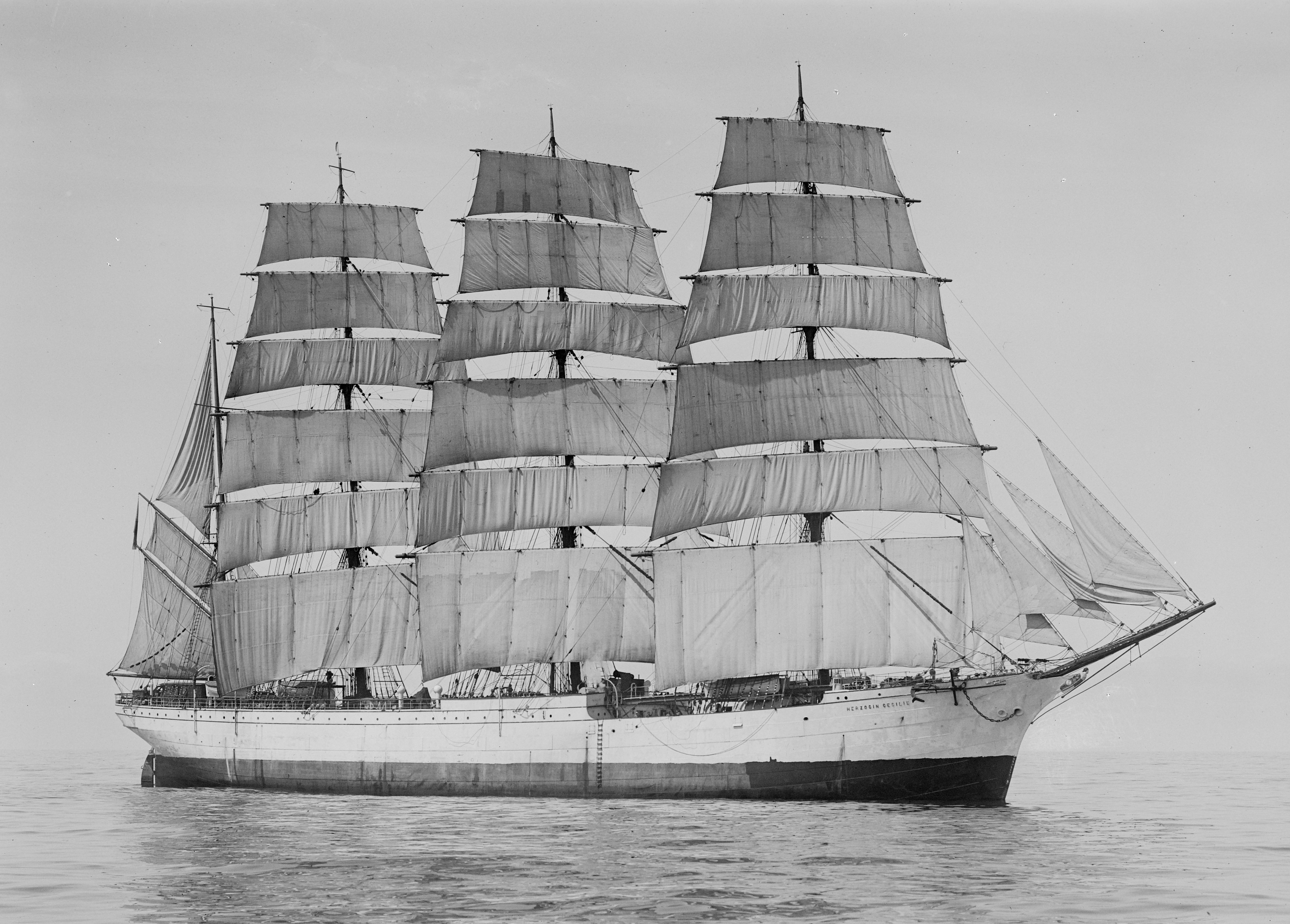
Four-masted, iron-hulled barque Herzogin Cecilie—one of the fastest windjammers built

A windjammer is a commercial sailing ship with multiple masts, however rigged. The informal term "windjammer" arose during the transition from the Age of Sail to the Age of Steam during the 19th century. The Oxford English Dictionary records the term "wind jammer" with reference to a ship from 1878 and nautical use of "windjamming" from 1886. The word has evolved to include sail-powered passenger cruise ships.

== Etymology ==
A New England windjammer—the Luther Little, a four-masted schooner—just after its construction in 1917

The word "windjammer" has a variety of associations, both nautical and not. In the late 19th century the term was pejorative, as used by sailors aboard steamships.

- In 1892, Rudder Magazine said in a story, "The deck hands on the liners contemptuously refer to [sailing vessels] as 'wind-jammers'."
- In 1917, the American Dialect Society recorded residents of the U.S. state of Maine referring to fore-and-aft sailing vessels as "windjammers" in a list of regional word usages.
- The Oxford Companion to Ships and the Sea calls windjammer "a non-nautical name by which square-rigged sailing ships are sometimes known".
- The Oxford Essential Dictionary of the U.S. Military calls windjammer "a merchant sailing ship".
- The following languages have adopted "windjammer" as a loanword from English in reference to sailing ships:
  - Czech: windjammer
  - Dutch: windjammer
  - German: Windjammer
  - Japanese: ウィンドジャマー
  - Polish: windjammer
  - Russian: винджаммер
  - Serbo-Croatian: виндјамер or vindjamer
  - Ukrainian: вінджамер
- Green's Dictionary of Slang has a variety of non-nautical definitions for the term.

== Examples ==
Windjammers

Full-rigged ship

Barque

Barquentine

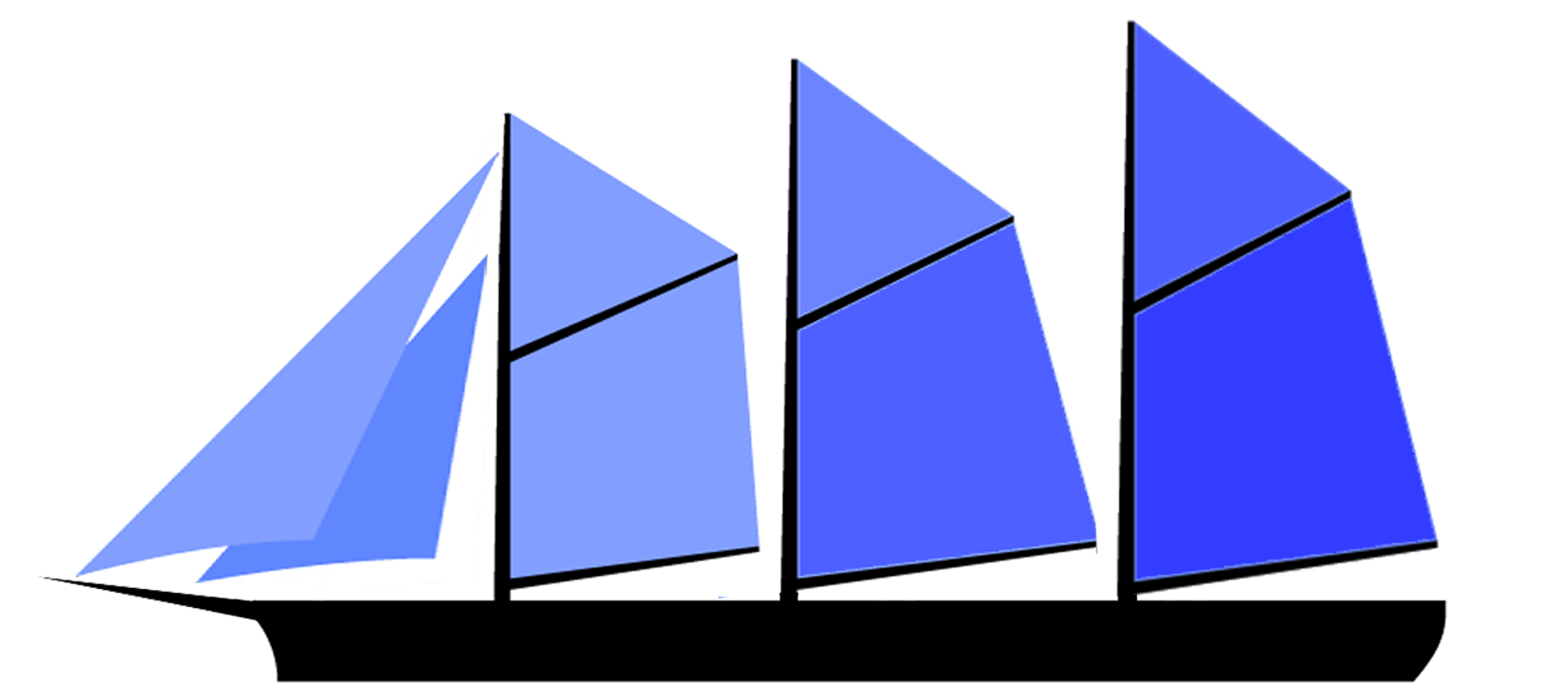
Schooner

Showing three-masted examples, progressing from square sails on each to all fore-and-aft sails on each.

Any of the following ships may be called a "windjammer":

- Barque
- Barquentine
- Brig
- Brigantine
- Clipper ship
- Full-rigged ship
- Iron-hulled sailing ship
- Sail-powered cruise ship
- Schooner

== In literature ==
Windjammers have figured prominently in both historical and fictional literature. Some examples include:

- Allen, Oliver E. (1978). The Windjammers. Amsterdam: Time-Life Books. ISBN 9780705406253.
- Lubbock, Basil (1953). The Last of the Windjammers. Brown, Son & Ferguson.
- Noppen, Ryan K. (2015). German Commerce Raiders 1914–18. Bloomsbury. ISBN 9781472809513.
- Richardson, V. A. (2006). The House of Windjammer. Bloomsbury USA. ISBN 9781582349848.
- Runciman, Walter Sr. (1902). Windjammers and Sea Tramps. London: At the Unicorn.
- Simpson, Paul W. (2017). Windjammer. Lulu. ISBN 9780244305727.
- Thomas, Lowell (2013). The Sea Devil: The Story Of Count Felix Von Luckner, The German War Raider. Read Books. ISBN 9781446548196.
