= Grant O. Gale =

Grant Oscar Gale (December 29, 1903 – April 14, 1998) was the S.S. Williston Professor of physics at Grinnell College in Grinnell, Iowa, the curator of Grinnell's Physics Historical Museum, and the namesake of the Grant O. Gale Observatory on the Grinnell campus.

== Education ==
While an undergraduate at the University of Wisconsin, Gale was a classmate of John Bardeen with whom he kept in touch in later years.

== Career and notable students ==
After graduation in 1928 Gale was offered an instructor position in physics at Grinnell College, and eventually became professor of physics. Until his death in 1998 he collected science equipment which had become obsolete and maintained a series of exhibits which now form the core of Grinnell's Physics Historical Museum.

From Bardeen, Gale acquired early versions of the transistor. One of Gale's most noted students was his former baby sitter, Robert Noyce, co-inventor of the integrated circuit and founder of Intel. While Noyce was his student at Grinnell:

Gale had kept up with Bardeen and his work, and he obtained two transistors in 1948 while Noyce was an undergraduate. Noyce worked with Gale on the transistor and was thus among the first to encounter its limitless potential.

Gale's mentorship of Noyce was also instrumental in protecting him from disciplinary action when Noyce stole a pig from a nearby farmer (who actually was also the Mayor) and then slaughtered it in Clark Hall for a college luau. The prank would have earned him expulsion and jail time since livestock theft was a felony offense in Iowa, if not for Gale's intervention.

Gale was also the physics instructor for Grinnell music student Herbie Hancock.

== Sundial ==
The large "Alpha and Omega Sundial" which sits next to the Noyce Science Center on the Grinnell College campus is named in honor of Gale's wife Harriet.
