= Percy & Small Shipyard =

Builder of largest wooden US sailing ship

- U.S. National Register of Historic Places
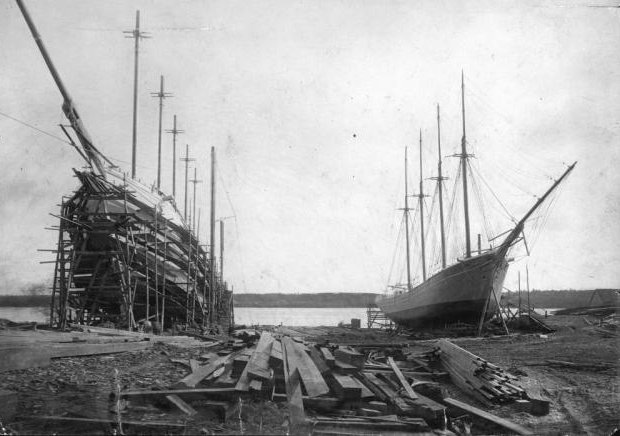

- Location within Maine Location within the United States
- Location: 451 Washington St., Bath, Maine
- Area: 3.0 acres (1.2 ha)
- Built: 1894
- NRHP reference No.: 71000043
- Added to NRHP: July 27, 1971

The Percy & Small Shipyard is a former shipyard and modern-day historic site located on the Kennebec River in Bath, Maine. In 1909, the shipyard launched Wyoming, the largest wooden sailing ship ever built.

== History ==
=== Founders ===
Born in Phippsburg, Maine, on December 13, 1856, Samuel Rogers Percy Jr. was the child of his namesake father, a ship's captain, and Eleanor M. (Golder) Percy. After the death of Samuel Percy Sr., Eleanor married a shipbuilder named George M. Adams. At age 16, Percy left school to work at a steam sawmill for half a year, then joined his stepfather's shipyard Adams & Hitchcock, followed by a stint at another yard. At age 19 he went to sea, initially in California including a stint on a steamer based in San Francisco, before rising to first mate and officer on the ship Enos Soule built in Freeport, Maine. He received his first command in 1882, on board Normandy built by Adams & Hitchcock. Percy returned to Bath in 1893 after learning his stepfather was near death, and the following year created Percy & Small alongside Frank Small.

Frank Albion Small was born in Bath on April 17, 1865, as the youngest son of shipmaster Joseph Small. Graduating from Bath High School, Small worked initially for a shipbroker and insurance agent, then took a job with the Kelley, Spear & Co. shipyard in Bath. Small would serve as Bath mayor in 1911 and 1912.

Percy & Small's lead designer was Miles M. Merry, who was born in 1844 in Damariscotta, Maine and learned shipbuilding at Goss, Sawyer & Packard and two other shipyards.

=== Founding and activities ===
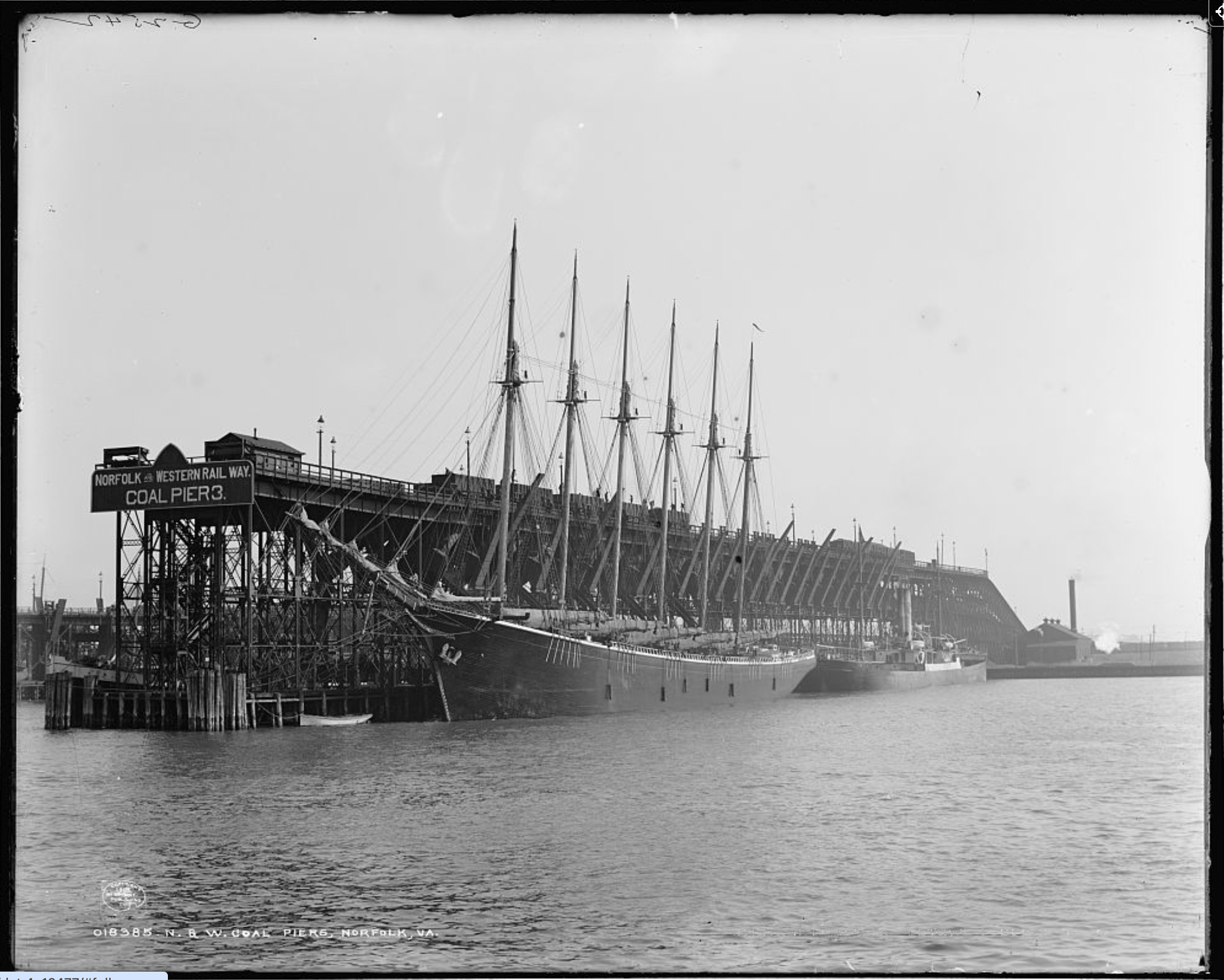
The six-masted schooner Eleanor A. Percy in 1900 at the N. & W. coal piers in Norfolk, Virginia.

Samuel R. Percy and Frank A. Small founded the Percy & Small Shipyard in 1894 to build coastwise schooners. The shipyard also operated a fleet of collier ships along the New England coast. Over an 18-year period, Percy & Small built 42 schooners, seven of which were stepped with six masts, including Wyoming. The shipyard is credited with building the ten largest sailing ships in Bath between 1890 and 1921.

In addition to the Percy & Small Shipyard's tandem slipways which could accommodate two ships under construction simultaneously, at least six buildings were known to have been built on the three-acre property: a sawmill and carpentry shop, a caulking shed, a blacksmith building, a mould loft to lay out ship designs, a paint and treenail production shop, and a generator building to furnish electricity.

=== End ===
The last known surviving ship built by Percy & Small was a four-masted schooner launched under the name Annie C. Ross and later renamed Star of the Sea, which sank in 1955 while moored at Glen Cove, New York.

In 1971, the Percy & Small Shipyard was listed on the National Register of Historic Places. Prior owners donated the property to Maine Maritime Museum in 1975.

Between 1980 and 1984, the Percy & Small Shipyard facilities were used for the restoration of Bowdoin, built in 1921 at the Hodgdon Brothers Shipyard in East Boothbay, Maine. Renowned for its voyages above the Arctic Circle, Bowdoin was added to the National Register of Historic Places in 1980; named Maine's official state vessel in 1986; and designated a National Historic Landmark in 1989.

== Competition and Challenges ==
The Percy & Small Shipyard launched its shipbuilding operations four years after the introduction of steel steamship construction at Bath Iron Works, a development that would eventually come to dominate shipbuilding.

According to its National Register of Historic Places application, the Percy & Small Shipyard also encountered challenges in sourcing wood for ship construction, with Maine logging supplies exhausted near the end of the 19th century from decades of shipyard demand and exports. Percy & Small relied on Carolina tamarack, Georgia pine and Virginia oak for shipbuilding, and mast timber from the Pacific Northwest which was shipped east on railroad flatbed cars. The construction of Wyoming alone required 1.5 million feet of pine and white oak.

Like other shipyards, Percy & Small used iron straps attached to wooden components of hulls to better reinforce ships against the punishment of waves, but ships were still prone to twisting and buckling that contributed to seams loosening between hull planking. Percy & Small ships were equipped with steam-powered engines to pump water from bilges, and hoist the massive schooner sails which allowed for smaller crews. That in turn helped ship owners cut costs on voyages to better compete with steamships for cargoes.

== List of ships ==
The Percy & Small Shipyard is believed to have built 42 schooners and a small number more of other vessels.

Ships built by Percy & Small Shipyard
Name	Launched	Type	Ton.	Len.	Beam	Depth	Notes
Charles P. Notman	August 29, 1894	Schooner	1,518	219.3	42.5	20.5	Sunk in June 1900 off Delaware after rammed by steamer Colorado in fog.
William H. Clifford	August 6, 1895	Schooner	1,594	221.6	43.5	19.6	Sunk September 8, 1917, in U-boat attack off France.
S.P. Blackburn	June 24, 1896	Schooner	1,757	233.7	43.9	20.1	Shipwrecked January 26, 1917, off Cape Hatteras.
Alice E. Clark	January 24, 1898	Schooner	1,622	227.4	43	20.1	Struck ledge July 1, 1909, in Penobscot Bay.
M. D. Cressy	May 11, 1899	Schooner	2,115	264.4	43.9	21.6	Sunk in storm April 9, 1917, in transit with cargo of coal from New York City to Le Havre, France.
Helen W. Martin	March 3, 1900	Schooner	2,265	281.6	44.8	20.9	Renamed Fenix after sale to new owners, ran aground on sand bar off Denmark during storm on January 20, 1920, and broke apart.
Eleanor A. Percy	October 10, 1900	Schooner	3,401	323.5	50	24.8	Foundered off Ireland on December 26, 1919.
William C. Carnegie	1900	Schooner	2,664	289.2	46.3	22.4	Shipwrecked May 1, 1909, after going aground on sand bar off Long Island, New York.
Oakley C. Curtis	January 19, 1901	Schooner	2,374	265	46.2	22.9	Converted to barge in 1930.
Martha P. Small	April 20, 1901	Schooner	2,178	264.6	45.7	21.5	Scrapped in 1923 in Montevideo, Uruguay after damage from 1921 storm.
Cora F. Cressey	April 12, 1902	Schooner	2,499	273	45.4	27.9	Spelled "Cora F. Cressy" in some historic accounts. Converted in 1929 to floating nightclub; scuttled in 1938 in Bremen, Maine. Hulk added to National Register of Historic Places in 1990.
Cordelia E. Hayes	August 17, 1901	Schooner	1,281	202.5	40.3	18.7	Shipwrecked January 15, 1905, after going aground at Diamond Shoals off Cape Hatteras.
Miles M. Merry	November 14, 1901	Schooner	1,589	215.2	43.2	20.1	Stranded February 17, 1909, off Long Island coast at Moriches, New York.
Addie M. Lawrence	December 17, 1902	Schooner	2,807	292.4	48.3	22.2	Went aground off France during storm on July 9, 1917.
Margaret Ward	August 9, 1902	Schooner	1,074	191.5	38.7	20.7	Sunk April 13, 1903, after collision with steamer El Rio off Galveston, Texas.
Florence M. Penley	April 2, 1903	Schooner	1,154	195.5	40.9	20.6	Foundered in storm off Barbados on September 8, 1908.
Elizabeth Palmer	August 26, 1903	Schooner	2,065	300.4	48.3	28.3	Sank January 26, 1915, after colliding with steamer SS Washingtonian off the coast of Delaware.
Grace A. Martin	July 16, 1904	Schooner	3,129	302	48.1	28.6	Foundered January 14, 1914, south of Matinicus Rock in the Gulf of Maine.
Ruth E. Merrill	November 23, 1904	Schooner	3,003	301	48.2	23.7	Sank in calm weather off Martha's Vineyard on January 12, 1924, after seams compromised in prior storm. Film footage captured of swamped schooner and crew members.
Evelyn W. Hinkly	January 19, 1905	Schooner	698	179.4	37.1	12.5	Lost after leaving New York on December 9, 1917, bound for La Rochelle, France.
Davis Palmer	November 28, 1905	Schooner	2,965	305.4	48.4	27.2	Sank after striking Finn's Ledge off Boston during blizzard, on December 26, 1909.
Robert P. Murphy	December 16, 1905	Schooner	697	175.3	37.1	13.5	Destroyed by fire in 1924 at Puerto Plata, Dominican Republic.
Alice M. Lawrence	December 1, 1906	Schooner	3,132	305.1	48.2	22.6	Went aground on Tuckernuck Shoal in Nantucket Sound on December 5, 1914.
Fannie Palmer II	May 25, 1907	Schooner	2,233	263.7	45	21.3	Foundered December 24, 1916, about 500 miles west of Gibraltar.
Edward J. Lawrence	April 2, 1908	Schooner	3,350	320.2	50	29	Sunk off Portland, Maine, after fire on December 27, 1925.
Governor Brooks	October 22, 1907	Schooner	2,628	280.7	45.8	21.5	Abandoned and destroyed by dynamite in 1921 while en route to Uruguay.
Edward B. Winslow	November 24, 1908	Schooner	3,424	318.4	50	23.7	Destroyed by fire in 1917 off coast of France.
Fuller Palmer	November 10, 1908	Schooner	3,060	309.4	48.9	27.4	Foundered southeast of Cape Cod in storm on January 15, 1914.
Wyoming	December 15, 1909	Schooner	3,730	329.5	50.1	30.4	Sunk in March 1924 in storm southeast of Cape Cod.
Dustin G. Cressy	July 12, 1912	Schooner	862	182.3	38.2	15	Capsized on February 19, 1917, after colliding with steamship Valeria in New York Harbor.
Carl F. Cressy	January 6, 1915	Schooner	898	189.1	38.3	15.5	Sunk by U-boat torpedo on August 23, 1917, after captain attempted to outrun the submarine in heavy weather.
Charles D. Loveland	April 6, 1916	Schooner	776	179.6	37	15	Renamed Esther Melbourne; shipwrecked off Haiti in 1928.
C. C. Mengel, Jr.	August 3, 1916	Schooner	844	184	38	15	Shipwrecked January 7, 1922, off Morant Cays and Jamaica.
Sam C. Mengel	January 13, 1917	Schooner	915	186.9	38	15.7	Scuttled by U-boat crew on June 3, 1918, off Delaware.
Dunham Wheeler	July 2, 1917	Schooner	1,926	254.5	44.2	23	Sank in November 1930, during storm off Cape Canaveral, Florida.
Annie C. Ross	October 3, 1917	Schooner	791	175.5	38	14	Sank September 4, 1955, while moored at Glen Cove, N.Y., having been renamed Star of the Sea.
St. Johns, N.F.	May 9, 1918	Schooner	2,046	254.1	43l3	23.9	Renamed Edward B. Winslow II; foundered December 12, 1928, en route from Norfolk to Bermuda.
Lieut. Sam Mengel	September 5, 1918	Schooner	907	187.7	38.4	15.2	Converted to barge in 1933; sank in storm October 16, 1935, off Boston. Hulk came to be known as "Bone wreck" in diving community due to whale skeleton scattered throughout wreckage.
Joseph S. Zeman	March 28, 1919	Schooner	1,956	253.2	43.2	23.7	Shipwrecked February 3, 1922, on Metinic Island Ledge in Penobscot Bay.
Miriam Landis	September 25, 1919	Schooner	904	187.4	38.4	15.3	Abandoned January 30, 1935, while sinking off Brava, Cape Verde.
Cecilia Cohen	February 9, 1920	Schooner	1,102	199	38.4	19.2	Sank August 7, 1921, off Cape Hatteras.

== Present Day ==
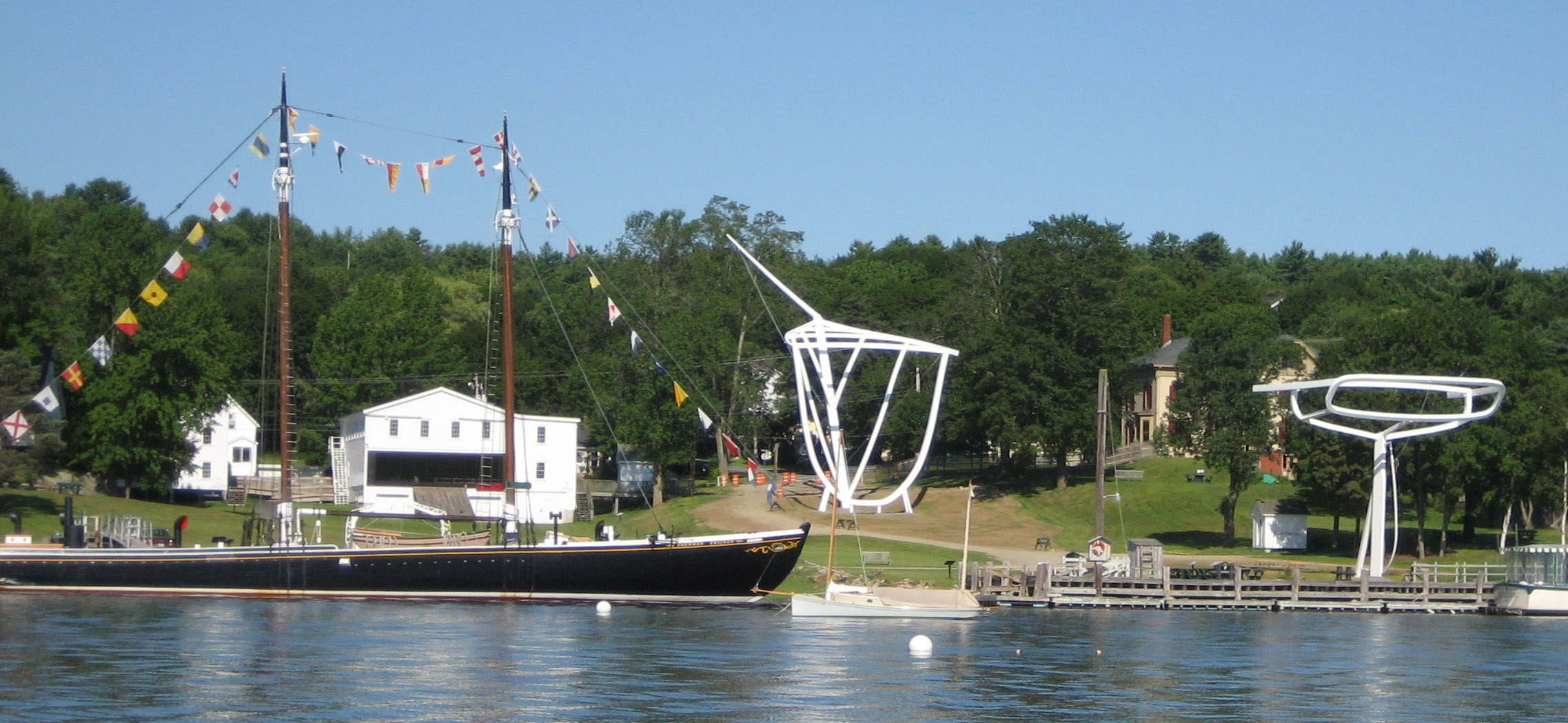
The Percy & Small Shipyard waterfront and grounds at Maine Maritime Museum in Bath, Maine.

Today, the Percy & Small Shipyard remains a part of the exhibits of the Maine Maritime Museum in Bath. It is believed to be the last intact shipyard in the United States that built wooden sailing ships, with a former blacksmith shop at the site reconstructed with a contemporary design.

An outdoor sculpture at the Percy & Small Shipyard museum provides a visual of the scale of Wyoming, with minimalist steel shapes for the bow and stern and six flagpoles standing 134 feet tall to evoke the masts.
