= Hesper and Luther Little =

American trade route schooners

- Hesper (left) and Luther Little (right) in 1979

History

United States
- Name: Hesper
- Owner: Various owners (1918-1932); Frank Winter (1932-1936)
- Builder: Crowninshild Shipbuilding
- Launched: July 4, 1918
- Fate: Abandoned in 1936, (Note: Hesper and Luther Little were abandoned upon Winter's death in 1936. While there is no evidence that Winter intentionally abandoned his ships, neither left Wiscasset after 1932.) demolished in 1998
- Notes: Hesper fully collapsed by 1994

History

United States
- Name: Luther Little
- Owner: Various owners (1917-1932); Frank Winter (1932-1936)
- Builder: Read Brothers Co
- Launched: December 1917
- Fate: Abandoned in 1936, demolished in 1998

General characteristics
- Type: Schooner
- Tonnage: 1,348 GRT (Hesper); 1,234 GRT (Luther Little)
- Length: 210 ft (64 m) (Hesper); 204 ft (62 m) (Luther Little)
- Decks: 2 (Luther Little)

Hesper and Luther Little were two trade route schooners that were left abandoned at Wiscasset, Maine. Both ships were built in Massachusetts in the 1910s, and wound up under one owner by 1932. Despite efforts to make use of the two schooners, their last owner went bankrupt and died not long afterwards. Both ships were essentially abandoned where their owner had left them in Wiscasset where they were disintegrated over time. Despite efforts to save the ships as tourist attractions, both were demolished in 1998 having been finally reduced to piles of debris by the elements. Various pieces of the former ships were saved by the public from the local landfill while others are now displayed in museums.

== History ==
Hesper and Luther Little were built in or near Somerset, Massachusetts, (Note: The Wiscasset Newspaper uses "South Somerset" as the origin of Hesper. This could also be interpreted as being in the southern town of Fall River, Massachusetts per the contemporary source used below.) in the late 1910s. They had donkey engines to raise the capstan and hoist the anchor, but no auxiliary power. The ships were used primarily for coal and lumber.

By the mid-1920s, steam-powered vessels were making sailing ships obsolete for cargo. Hesper and Luther Little were taken out of service. They found their way to Wiscasset, where they were purchased at auction in 1932. The buyer was Frank Winter, was an entrepreneur who had purchased the Wiscasset and Quebec Railroad to operate a Boston-to-Wiscasset coal and lumber business. He planned to have the ships bring coal north to Wiscasset for transshipment to Maine's interior, then to bring lumber from the state's forests back south. But Winter's businesses ran into financial difficulties, and the railway was ripped up in 1934 to pay debts. When Winter died in 1936, the schooners were abandoned to the elements in Wiscasset Harbor.

Hesper decayed more quickly, thanks in part to at least two incidents of arson. There were efforts made to try and preserve the ships, but the town of Wiscasset did not want to spend the money to do so. For decades, the ships sat where they had been left becoming a tourist attraction visible from U.S. Route 1. Both ships kept their shapes until the mid-1990s when they substantially disintegrated. They were both demolished, and disposed of in the late 1990s after a storm had destroyed the remains. The public was allowed to scavenge the remains at the landfill; what was left was run through a wood chipper.

=== Hesper ===
The Hesper was built as a four-masted schooner in 1918 by Crowninshield Shipbuilding, which was located in Fall River, Massachusetts. She was primarily built for offshore trading as requested by Rogers & Webb of Boston. Her launch on July 4, 1918, did not go smoothly as the event was delayed by a faulty slipway. Hesper's early career involved crossing the Atlantic Ocean frequently as she brought coal to Lisbon, and case oil to France. She made her way back to the United States in turn with fertilizer from Venezuela. Her career was also marked by several notable incidents which added to her faulty launch. Hesper left Norfolk, Virginia, on February 27, 1920, with a cargo of bituminous for Boston. She never made it to the city as a powerful gale tore her sails apart and drove her off course. She was ultimately able to make it to Portland, Maine for repairs. In February 1925, she was grounded while entering Boston harbor, but was freed with the assistance of tugs. By 1927, Hesper was laid up at Rockport, Maine where her final incident took place in the following year. This event occurred sometime in January 1928 when she broke free of her moorings during a Nor'easter causing her beach nearby on shore. Hesper was freed, and eventually sailed to Portland where she would remain out of service until she was sold at auction. Winter bought the Hesper for US$600 in 1932, and had her towed to Wiscasset where she arrived in September of that year.

Hesper had her masts cut down, and was hauled closer to shore with the Luther Little in 1940. Her first major fire occurred when her aft deckhouse was intentionally burned to celebrate the end of World War II. Despite the damage it was possible to board Hesper as late as the 1960s, as a few explorers were able to access her lower decks. Hesper's next and last major fire occurred on July 4, 1978, when some teenagers threw a sparkler on board. During this time a salvager was able to make off with a wooden plank of the ship that said "Hesper" on it possibly saving it from destruction. The Wiscasset fire department was finally able to control the fire which preserved what was left of the ship. Her burnt out hulk eventually disintegrated into a pile of debris by 1994 as her bow and sides collapsed into the mud. Hesper's end came in 1998 when it was decided by the town to demolish what was left of the ships.

=== Luther Little ===
Luther Little during launch day (1917)

The Luther Little was built as a four-masted schooner in December 1917 by the Read Brothers Company, which was located in Somerset, Massachusetts. Like the Hesper she was also built for offshore trading as requested by Rogers & Webb of Boston. Both ships used small coal boilers, but Luther Little's also provided heat and hot water to the ship's forward and main cabins in addition to mechanical work. When Luther Little was launched she is said to have been the first boat of her kind launched from Fall River in more than 40 years (c. 1878). She was launched fully rigged as at the time there was an increased demand for ships. Luther Little had a brief bit of excitement in her career, when in June 1918 her crew managed to rescue two balloonists who had crashed in the Atlantic Ocean off the coast of Delaware. Other than this event, she was used in the coal and lumber trade which took her as far south as Haiti. It was here in 1920 where she was grounded with an overloaded cargo of logwood that was bound for Pennsylvania. She was able to be pulled off and freed after spending two weeks stuck in place with non-extensive damage done. As time passed it became harder and harder to find cargo as the Age of Sail drew to a close in favor of steamships. Luther Little wound up either tied up to a dock or laid at anchor more than she worked. She was eventually taken out of service for good and laid up by 1925. She sat idle until she was purchased by Frank Winter in 1932, who had her towed alongside the Hesper in Wiscasset.

After Winter's death, the Luther Little was hauled closer to shore along with Hesper in 1940. Both ships were forgotten about until 1965 when the Wiscasset Industrial Development Committee looked into possibly restoring the Luther Little as a tourist attraction. The plan would have involved burning her to the waterline in order to preserve the ship, but this was never done. During this decade it was possible for a few explorers to access her lower decks along with the Hesper. By the 1970s her deck house fixtures had been stripped, and water had made its way into the 200-foot (61 m) cargo hold. The next effort to save the Luther Little came in 1978 when a group known as "Friends of the Wiscasset Schooners" hoped to get enough private donations to stabilize the old ships. Luther Little's rear mast which had been leaning to the stern collapsed in the following year due to an earthquake. Her stern section gave way next, and by 1981 the group abandoned their efforts to save the ships. By early 1991, her bow had partly collapsed, and during the same year she was set on fire by a flare gun. Although the fire was put out, Luther Little continued to deteriorate rapidly. At some point in time braces were added to Luther Little's three remaining masts in order to delay her demise. These masts finally came crashing down during a storm in 1995, and three years later she was demolished along with the Hesper. These remains went to a local landfill where they were later picked through by the public (see section below).

== Legacy ==
Luther Little's lower masts and a single topmast were saved by the town of Wiscasset as the debris was removed in 1998. The remaining piles were then hauled off to the local landfill where they sat undisturbed until early 2001. During this time, the Maine Department of Environmental Protection ordered the town to move the ships to a more secure location due their possible environmental impact. Wiscasset chose instead to open the piles to the public to take what they wanted. Various remains of the Hesper and Luther Little were saved as people picked through their debris at the local landfill. Decades of time in the mud had turned some of the oak wood used for the schooners into a shiny black 'cement" like material. The wood turned out to be workable as it was made into unique items by various craftsmen. A Brunswick-based table company was able to salvage enough wood to make a dining room table, pieces were picked out for use by a clock maker, and kitchen cabinets were fashioned from the salvaged wood for use in a Wiscasset home. The Maine Maritime Museum saved a few pieces for their museum in Bath, Maine, and wood from the schooners is also on display in the Somerset Historical Society. Remains of the ships in the form of deteriorated iron such as the bollards are still at the local landfill according to a report done in July 2015. Anything of value had already been stripped from the ships long ago as they sat in Wiscasset Harbor.

== In popular culture ==
In 1985, folk singer/songwriter Gordon Bok wrote a song called Wiscasset Schooners. Included in the group singing were Lois Lyman (the song's author), and her husband. Bok included the song on his albums Schooners, and Harbors of Home.

== See also ==
- Cora F. Cressey - another Maine schooner that was abandoned in the 1930s and lasted into the 1990s.
- List of schooners - for a dynamic list.
