= Ann Bowers =

American business executive and philanthropist (1936–2024)

Ann Schmeltz Bowers (November 1937 – January 24, 2024) was an American business executive. She served as Intel Corporations head of personnel and later served as the first Vice President of Human Resources at Apple Inc. She was married to Bob Noyce until his death in 1990. She was chair of the Noyce Foundation.

== Early life and education ==
Bowers received a Bachelor of Arts degree in English from Cornell University in 1959 and an honorary doctorate from the University of Santa Clara.

== Career ==
Bowers started at Intel Corporation in 1970 and in 1976 when she left, was their first Director of Personnel. In 1980, she was hired as Apple's first Vice President of Human Resources.

== Philanthropy ==
Bowers, along with her husband's daughter and brother, founded the Robert Noyce Foundation after her husband, Intel founder Robert Noyce, died in 1990. The foundation focuses on education particularly in STEM fields. In 2020, she personally gifted more than $100 million to Cornell University establishing the Cornell Ann S. Bowers College of Computing and Information Science.

== Personal life and death ==
Bowers married Robert Noyce in 1974 when both worked at Intel Corporation. She received an honorary PhD from Santa Clara University. Bowers died on January 24, 2024, at the age of 86.
