= Eleanor A. Percy =

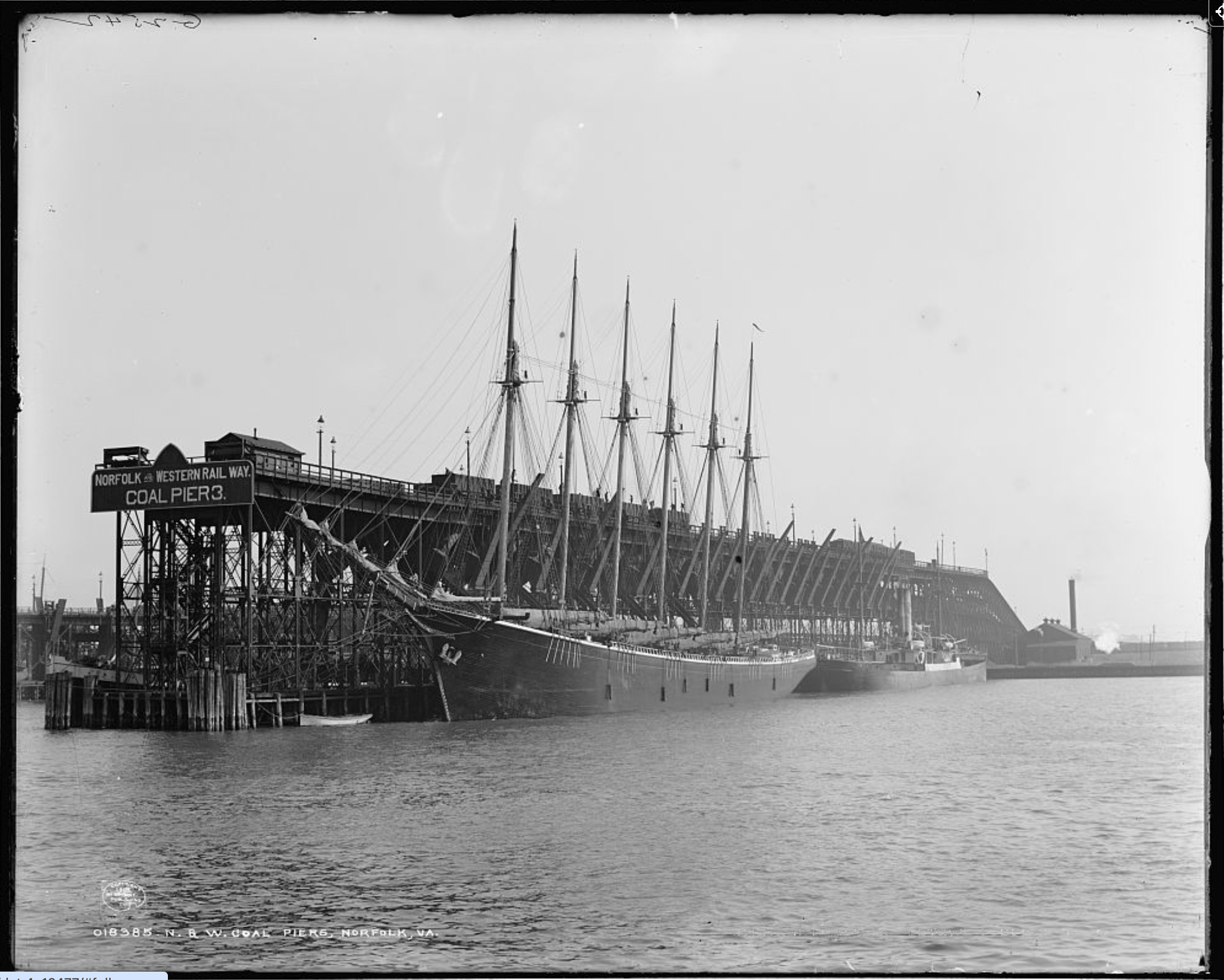
- Eleanor A. Percy in Norfolk, Virginia in 1905.

History
- Name: (United States) (1900-1916) Eleanor A. Percy; (Norway) (1916-1919) Eleanor A. Percy
- Owner: (1900-1916) Percy & Small Shipyard; (1916-1919) Heistein Thv. B. & Sønner
- Port of registry: (1900-1916) Bath, United States; (1916-1919) Kristiansand, Norway
- Builder: Percy & Small Shipyard
- Cost: $140,000
- Yard number: 8
- Laid down: 1900
- Launched: 10 October 1900
- Acquired: 1900
- In service: 1900
- Out of service: 26 December 1919
- Fate: Sunk after having sprung a leak on 26 December 1919

General characteristics
- Type: Schooner
- Tonnage: 3,401 GRT
- Length: 98.6 metres (323 ft 6 in)
- Beam: 15.2 metres (49 ft 10 in)
- Depth: 7.6 metres (24 ft 11 in)
- Propulsion: 6 masts
- Crew: 16

SS Eleanor A. Percy was an American built Norwegian wooden six-masted Schooner which sank with the loss of 12 lives after having sprung a leak off Ireland on 26 December 1919 while she was on a voyage from Rio de Janeiro, Brazil to Copenhagen, Denmark with a cargo of wheat.

== Construction ==
Eleanor A. Percy was built at the Percy & Small Shipyard in Bath, United States. The ship was launched on the Kennebec River on 10 October 1900 and completed later that same year. The ship was 98.6 metres (323 ft 6 in) long, had a beam of 15.2 metres (49 ft 10 in) and a depth of 7.6 metres (24 ft 11 in). She was assessed at 3,401 GRT and had 6 masts.

== Career and loss ==
Eleanor A. Percy entered service as largest the six-masted schooner in the world until the construction of Wyoming in 1909. on 29 June 1901, Eleanor A. Percy ironically collided with the only other existing six-masted schooner George W. Wells off Cape Cod in the Atlantic Ocean. The ship only received minor damage from the collision. Eleanor A. Percy was sold to Heistein Thv. B. & Sønner in November 1916 for $800.000. Eleanor A. Percy departed Rio de Janeiro, Brazil for Copenhagen, Denmark with a cargo of 4,000 tons of wheat under the command of Captain Mitchell with a crew of 15 and a German stowaway on board on 11 November 1919. As the ship was 350 nautical miles (650 km; 400 mi) off the Irish coast on 24 December 1919, the schooner sprang a severe leak during a storm and started to sink. The crew attempted to save the ship by the use of pumps, but by 26 December, they were overwhelmed and had to abandon the ship. Second Mate N. P. Austin and four Scandinavian seamen got into on of the three motorboats that the schooner carried while the rest of the crew boarded the other two motorboats before the ship went down. But as there were still large waves from the storm that sank their ship, the motorboats quickly got separated and the second mate's motorboat ran out of gas some hours later. The 5 survivors rationed their water and saltwater-soaked biscuits as they placed their clothes on a pole to attract any vessel's attention as they awaited rescue. On 29 December, the motorboat was spotted by the Swansea trawler Walwyn Castle while they were 150 nautical miles (280 km; 170 mi) West of Lundy, and all 5 men were rescued by the trawler's crew, who gave them food and warm clothing. The Captain, stowaway and 10 other crewmen were never seen again and presumed lost at sea. The ship's log washed ashore on the Isles of Scilly two years after the sinking and was in a good enough state of preservation that it could still be read.
