= Robert Noyce =

American physicist and entrepreneur (1927–1990)

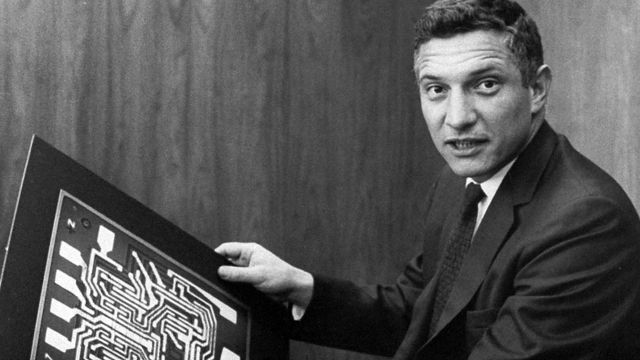
- Noyce in 1959
- Born: Robert Norton Noyce; December 12, 1927; Burlington, Iowa, U.S.
- Died: June 3, 1990 (aged 62); Austin, Texas, U.S.
- Education: Grinnell College: B.A., Physics; Massachusetts Institute of Technology: Ph.D., Physics
- Known for: Invention of the integrated circuit
- Spouses: Elizabeth Bottomley (m. 1953; div. 1974) Ann Bowers (m. 1974)
- Children: 4
- Awards: Stuart Ballantine Medal (1966); IEEE Medal of Honor (1978); Harry H. Goode Memorial Award (1978); IEEE Cledo Brunetti Award (1978); Faraday Medal (1979); National Medal of Technology (1979, 1987); Harold Pender Award (1980); Computer Entrepreneur Award (1986); John Fritz Medal (1989); Charles Stark Draper Prize (1989)
- Scientific career
- Fields: Physics
- Workplaces: Philco; Shockley Semiconductor Laboratory; Fairchild Semiconductor; Intel
- Thesis: A photoelectric investigation of surface states on insulators (1953)
- Doctoral advisor: Wayne B. Nottingham

Robert Norton Noyce (December 12, 1927 – June 3, 1990) was an American physicist and entrepreneur who co-founded Fairchild Semiconductor in 1957 and Intel Corporation in 1968. Nicknamed "the Mayor of Silicon Valley," he was also credited with the realization of the first monolithic integrated circuit or microchip made with silicon, which fueled the personal computer revolution and gave Silicon Valley its name. (Note: While Kilby's invention was six months earlier, neither man rejected the title of co-inventor.)

Noyce founded The Noyce School of Applied Computing within the College of Engineering at Cal Poly, San Luis Obispo. In 1987, President Ronald Reagan awarded him the National Medal of Technology, and in 1989, he was inducted into the U.S. Business Hall of Fame, with President George H. W. Bush delivering the keynote. In 1990, he received a Lifetime Achievement Medal alongside Jack Kilby and John Bardeen during the bicentennial celebration of the Patent Act.

== Early life ==
Robert Norton Noyce was born on December 12, 1927, in Burlington, Iowa, the third of four sons of Harriet May (née Norton) and The Rev. Ralph Brewster Noyce. His father graduated from Doane College, Oberlin College, and the Chicago Theological Seminary and was also nominated for a Rhodes Scholarship. His mother was the daughter of The Rev. Milton J. Norton, a Congregational clergyman, and Louise Hill. She was a graduate of Oberlin College and prior to her marriage, she had dreams of becoming a missionary. Journalist Tom Wolfe described her as "an intelligent woman with a commanding will".

Noyce had three siblings: Donald Sterling Noyce, Gaylord Brewster Noyce and Ralph Harold Noyce. His brother Donald would go on to become a respected professor and associate dean of undergraduate affairs in the UC Berkeley College of Chemistry; Robert later created the Donald Sterling Noyce Prize to reward excellence in undergraduate teaching at Berkeley. His brother Gaylord would go on to become a respected professor of practical theology and dean of students at Yale Divinity School; in 1961, while a young professor, he was arrested for being one of the Freedom Riders of the civil rights movement.

Noyce's earliest childhood memory involved beating his father at ping pong and feeling shocked when his mother reacted to the news of his victory with a distracted "Wasn't that nice of Daddy to let you win?" Even at the age of five, Noyce felt offended by the notion of intentionally losing. "That's not the game", he sulked to his mother. "If you're going to play, play to win!"

When Noyce was twelve years old in the summer of 1940, he and his brother built a boy-sized aircraft, which they used to fly from the roof of the Grinnell College stables. Later he built a radio from scratch and motorized his sled by welding a propeller and a motor from an old washing machine to the back of it. His parents were both religious but Noyce became an agnostic and irreligious in later life.

== Education ==
Noyce grew up in Grinnell, Iowa. While in high school, he exhibited a talent for mathematics and science and took the Grinnell College freshman physics course in his senior year. He graduated from Grinnell High School in 1945 and entered Grinnell College in the fall of that year. He was the star diver on the 1947 Midwest Conference Championship swim team. While at Grinnell College, Noyce sang, played the oboe and acted. In Noyce's junior year, he got in trouble for stealing a 25-pound pig from the Grinnell mayor's farm and roasting it at a school luau. The mayor wrote to his parents stating that "In the agricultural state of Iowa, stealing a domestic animal is a felony which carries a minimum penalty of a year in prison and a fine of one dollar." Noyce faced expulsion from school but Grant Gale, Noyce's physics professor and president of the college, did not want to lose a student with Noyce's potential. They compromised with the mayor so that Grinnell would compensate him for the pig, and suspended Noyce for one semester. He returned in February 1949, and graduated that year with a Bachelor of Arts in Physics. He also received a single honor from his classmates: the Brown Derby Prize, which recognized "the senior man who earned the best grades with the least amount of work".

While Noyce was an undergraduate, he was fascinated by the field of physics and took a course in the subject that was taught by professor Grant Gale. Gale obtained two of the first transistors ever produced by Bell Labs and showed them off to his class. Noyce was hooked. Gale suggested that he apply to the doctoral program in physics at Massachusetts Institute of Technology (MIT), which he did.

Noyce had a mind so quick that his graduate school friends called him "Rapid Robert". In 1953, he received a Doctor of Philosophy in Physics from MIT, supervised by Wayne B. Nottingham.

== Career ==
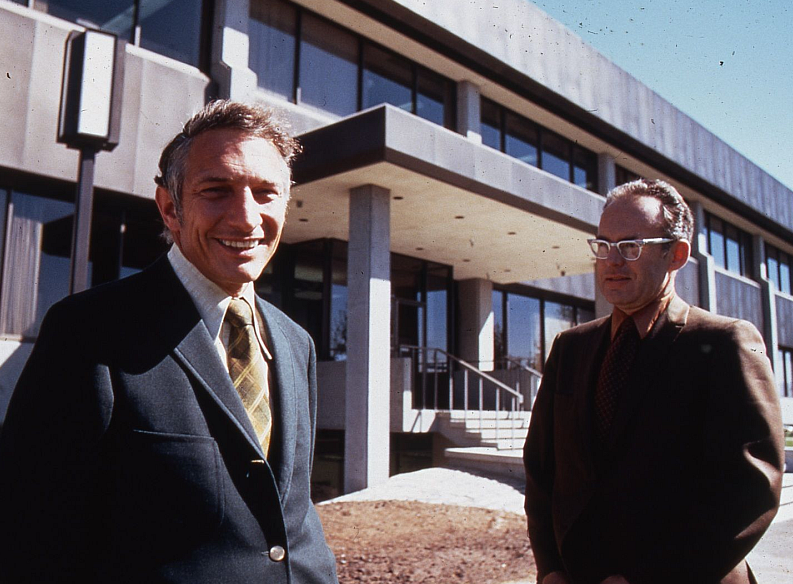
Robert Noyce and Gordon Moore in front of the Intel SC1 building in Santa Clara in 1970

After graduating from MIT in 1953, Noyce took a job as a research engineer at Philco in Philadelphia, Pennsylvania. He left in 1956 to join William Shockley at the Shockley Semiconductor Laboratory in Mountain View, California. Noyce left a year later with the "traitorous eight" upon having issues with Shockley's management style, and co-founded the influential Fairchild Semiconductor corporation. According to Sherman Fairchild, Noyce's impassioned presentation of his vision was the reason Fairchild had agreed to create the semiconductor division for the traitorous eight.

Noyce was vital to the invention of the integrated circuit. After Jack Kilby invented the first hybrid integrated circuit (hybrid IC) in 1958, Noyce in 1959 independently invented a new type of integrated circuit, the monolithic integrated circuit (monolithic IC). It was more practical than Kilby's implementation. Noyce's design was made of silicon, whereas Kilby's chip was made of germanium. Noyce's invention was the first monolithic integrated circuit chip. Unlike Kilby's IC which had external wire connections and could not be mass-produced, Noyce's monolithic IC chip put all components on a chip of silicon and connected them with aluminum lines. The basis for Noyce's monolithic IC was the planar process, developed in early 1959 by Jean Hoerni. In turn, the basis for Hoerni's planar process were the silicon surface passivation and thermal oxidation methods developed by Mohamed Atalla in 1957.

Noyce and Gordon Moore founded Intel in 1968 when they left Fairchild Semiconductor. Arthur Rock, the chairman of Intel's board and a major investor in the company, said that for Intel to succeed, the company needed Noyce, Moore and Andrew Grove. And it needed them in that order. Noyce: the visionary, born to inspire; Moore: the virtuoso of technology; and Grove: the technologist turned management scientist. Noyce served as the first CEO, until 1975, when he was succeeded by Moore. The relaxed culture that Noyce brought to Intel was a carry-over from his style at Fairchild Semiconductor. He treated employees as family, rewarding and encouraging teamwork. Noyce's management style could be called "roll up your sleeves". He shunned fancy corporate cars, reserved parking spaces, private jets, offices, and furnishings in favor of a less-structured, relaxed working environment in which everyone contributed and no one received lavish benefits. By declining the usual executive perks he stood as a model for future generations of Intel CEOs.

At Intel, he oversaw the invention of the microprocessor as a concept by Ted Hoff and design of the first commercial microprocessor Intel 4004 by Federico Faggin, which was his second revolution.

== Personal life ==
In 1953, Noyce married Elizabeth Bottomley, who was a 1951 graduate of Tufts University. While living in Los Altos, California, they had four children: William B., Pendred, Priscilla, and Margaret. Elizabeth loved New England, so the family acquired a 50-acre coastal summer home in Bremen, Maine. Elizabeth and the children would summer there. Robert would visit during the summer, while continuing to work at Intel. They divorced in 1974.

On November 27, 1974, Noyce married Ann Schmeltz Bowers. Bowers, a graduate of Cornell University, also received an honorary Ph.D. from Santa Clara University, where she was a trustee for nearly 20 years. She was the first director of personnel for Intel Corporation and the first vice president of human resources for Apple Inc. She was a founding trustee and served as chair of the board for the Noyce Foundation, founded in 1990. Bowers died on January 24, 2024, at the age of 86.

Noyce kept active his entire life. He enjoyed reading Hemingway, and he flew his own airplane and also participated in hang-gliding and scuba diving. Noyce believed that microelectronics would continue to advance in complexity and sophistication well beyond its current state; this led to the question of what use society would make of the technology. In his last interview, Noyce was asked what he would do if he were "emperor" of the United States. He said that he would, among other things, "...make sure we are preparing our next generation to flourish in a high-tech age. And that means education of the lowest and the poorest, as well as at the graduate school level."

=== Death ===
Noyce suffered a heart attack at age 62 at home on June 3, 1990, and later died at the Seton Medical Center in Austin, Texas.

== Recognition ==
=== Awards ===
Year	Organization	Award	Co-recipients	Citation	Ref.
1966	Franklin Institute	Stuart Ballantine Medal	Jack Kilby	"For the development of monolithic integrated circuits (microchips)."	
1978	Institute of Electrical and Electronics Engineers	IEEE Medal of Honor	—	"For his contributions to the silicon integrated circuit, a cornerstone of modern electronics."	
1978	IEEE Computer Society	Harry H. Goode Memorial Award	Gordon Moore	"In recognition of their original contributions to semiconductor integrated circuit technology, their pioneering achievements in using this technology for the development and production of microprocessors and many other computer system components, and their distinguished leadership of and insight in computer science and technology, which have revolutionized the information processing field."	
1978	Institute of Electrical and Electronics Engineers	IEEE Cledo Brunetti Award	Jack Kilby	"For contributions to miniaturization through inventions and the development of integrated circuits."	
1979	Institution of Electrical Engineers	Faraday Medal	—	—	
1979	United States Patent and Trademark Office	National Medal of Technology	—	"For contributions to a variety of semiconductor devices, but especially for the integrated circuit, the cornerstone of modern electronics."	
1980	University of Pennsylvania	Harold Pender Award	—	—	
1986	IEEE Computer Society	Computer Entrepreneur Award	Gordon Moore	"In recognition of their early contributions to microcomputers and silicon components."	
1987	United States Patent and Trademark Office	National Medal of Technology	—	"For his inventions in the field of semiconductor integrated circuits, for his leading role in the establishment of the microprocessor which has led to much wider use of more powerful computers, and for his leadership of research and development in these areas, all of which have had profound consequences both in the United States and throughout the world."	
1989	American Association of Engineering Societies	John Fritz Medal	—	—	
1989	National Academy of Engineering	Charles Stark Draper Prize	Jack Kilby	"For their independent development of the monolithic integrated circuit."	

=== Memberships ===
Year	Organization	Type	Ref.
1980	American Academy of Arts and Sciences	Member	
1980	National Academy of Sciences	Member	

=== Other recognition ===
In 1989, Noyce was inducted into the U.S. Business Hall of Fame, sponsored by Junior Achievement, during a black tie ceremony keynoted by President George H. W. Bush. In 1990, Noyce, Jack Kilby, and John Bardeen received a "Lifetime Achievement Medal" during the bicentennial celebration of the Patent Act.

== Commemoration ==
The Robert N. Noyce ’49 Science Center at Grinnell College, his alma mater, is named in his honor.

On December 12, 2011, Noyce was honored with a Google Doodle celebrating the 84th anniversary of his birth.

In 2000, Jack Kilby received the Nobel Prize in Physics. In his acceptance speech ("Nobel Lecture"), he mentions a small number of people whose work contributed to the success of integrated circuits, mentioning Noyce three times.

The Noyce Foundation was founded in 1990 by his family. The foundation was dedicated to improving public education in mathematics and science in grades K-12. The foundation announced that it would end operations in 2015.

California Polytechnic State University at San Luis Obispo (Cal Poly), established The Noyce School of Applied Computing in the College of Engineering with a $60 million gift from the Robert N. Noyce Trust in June of 2022.

In 1990, Congress established the Robert Noyce National Math and Science Teachers Corps Act which authorizes awards up to 5,000 scholarships annually to assist individuals in obtaining a teaching degree. These awards are granted to institutions of higher education who administer the projects after successful proposal submissions through the National Science Foundation's Robert Noyce Teacher Scholarship Program ("Noyce"). Pre-service teachers are recruited by their college/university and must be STEM majors. Scholarship recipients to agree to teach science or mathematics in a high-need school districts for at least two years for each fiscal year the recipient received such a scholarship. The American Association for the Advancement of Science (AAAS) works with the NSF Robert Noyce Teacher Scholarship Program to identify and disseminate information about effective practices and strategies for attracting, selecting, and preparing new K-12 STEM teachers and retaining them in the STEM teacher workforce.

== Patents ==
Noyce was granted 15 patents. Patents are listed in order issued, not filed.

- U.S. patent 2,875,141 Method and apparatus for forming semiconductor structures, filed August 1954, issued February 1959, assigned to Philco Corporation
- U.S. patent 2,929,753 Transistor structure and method, filed April 1957, issued March 1960, assigned to Beckmann Instruments
- U.S. patent 2,959,681 Semiconductor scanning device, filed June 1959, issued November 1960, assigned to Fairchild Semiconductor
- U.S. patent 2,968,750 Transistor structure and method of making the same, filed March 1957, issued January 1961, assigned to Clevite Corporation
- U.S. patent 2,971,139 Semiconductor switching device, filed June 1959, issued February 1961, assigned to Fairchild Semiconductor
- U.S. patent 2,981,877 Semiconductor Device and Lead Structure, filed July 1959, issued April 1961, assigned to Fairchild Semiconductor
- U.S. patent 3,010,033 Field effect transistor, filed January 1958, issued November 1961, assigned to Clevite Corporation
- U.S. patent 3,098,160 Field controlled avalanche semiconductive device, filed February 1958, issued July 1963, assigned to Clevite Corporation
- U.S. patent 3,108,359 Method for fabricating transistors, filed June 1959, issued October 1963, assigned to Fairchild Camera and Instrument Corp.
- U.S. patent 3,111,590 Transistor structure controlled by an avalanche barrier, filed June 1958, issued November 1963, assigned to Clevite Corporation
- U.S. patent 3,140,206 Method of making a transistor structure (coinventor William Shockley), filed April 1957, issued July 1964, assigned to Clevite Corporation
- U.S. patent 3,150,299 Semiconductor circuit complex having isolation means, filed September 1959, issued September 1964, assigned to Fairchild Camera and Instrument Corp.
- U.S. patent 3,183,129 Method of forming a semiconductor, filed July 1963, issued May 1965, assigned to Fairchild Camera and Instrument Corp.
- U.S. patent 3,199,002 Solid state circuit with crossing leads, filed April 1961, issued August 1965, assigned to Fairchild Camera and Instrument Corp.
- U.S. patent 3,325,787 Trainable system, filed October 1964, issued June 1967, assigned to Fairchild Camera and Instrument Corp.

Note: In 1960 Clevite Corporation acquired Shockley Semiconductor Laboratory, a subsidiary of Beckman Instruments, for whom Noyce worked.

== Citations ==
Business positions
Preceded by Company founded	CEO, Intel; 1968–1975	Succeeded by Gordon Moore
