= Elizabeth Noyce =

American philanthropist

- Born: Elizabeth Bottomley; October 7, 1930; Auburn, Massachusetts, U.S.
- Died: September 18, 1996 (aged 65); Bremen, Maine, U.S.
- Education: Tufts University
- Occupation: Philanthropist
- Spouse: Robert Noyce (m. 1953; div. 1974)
- Children: 4
- Parents: Frank Bottomley; Helen McLaren

Elizabeth Noyce (née Bottomley; October 7, 1930 – September 18, 1996) was an American philanthropist, and former wife of Fairchild Semiconductor general manager and a founder of Intel Corporation, Robert Noyce.

== Biography ==
Noyce was born Elizabeth Bottomley in Auburn, Massachusetts, United States, the daughter of Frank Bottomley and Helen McLaren. She was a 1951 graduate of Tufts University, located in the Boston suburb of Medford.

In the early 1950s, Robert Noyce was working on his doctorate at MIT, in Cambridge near Boston. The couple married in 1953, the year Robert received his PhD.

Several years later the Noyces moved to California, where Nobel laureate William Shockley had started Shockley Semiconductor Laboratory in Mountain View in 1956. Robert was one of the "traitorous eight" who left Shockley in 1957 and started Fairchild Semiconductor. He and Texas Instruments' Jack Kilby are credited with inventing the integrated circuit. In 1968, Noyce and Gordon Moore started Intel in Mountain View. Intel developed the first commercially available dynamic RAM (i1103), EPROM (i1702), and commercially available microprocessor (i4004), becoming a huge financial success.

During this time, the couple lived in Los Altos. They had four children: William B., Pendred, Priscilla, and Margaret. Elizabeth loved New England, so the family acquired a 50-acre coastal summer home in Bremen, Maine. She and the children would summer there. Robert would visit during breaks from Intel.

He also started an extramarital affair with a 28-year-old Intel mask designer, Barbara Maness, conducted as an "open secret" at Intel. Elizabeth learned of it and the marriage ended in divorce in 1975. Under California's community property law she received half of the couple's assets. Robert later married Ann Bowers, Intel's head of personnel.

Elizabeth then took up full residence in Bremen. She became the area's leading philanthropist and art collector. Among other major gifts, she established the Libra Foundation. She initiated and funded a referendum that imposed term-limits on Maine's state legislators and constitutional officers.

Noyce, a smoker, developed emphysema, and died from a heart attack on September 18, 1996, aged 65, at her home.
