= Wyoming (schooner) =

Largest wooden ship built

Coordinates: 41°32′N 69°54′W

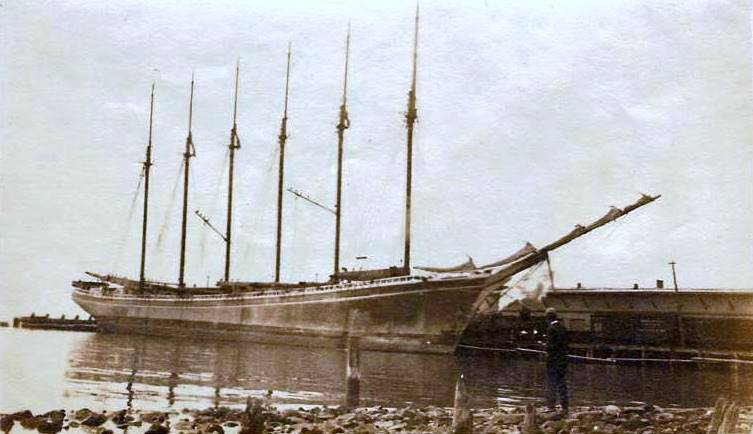
- Schooner Wyoming in 1917

History
- Namesake: Wyoming
- Launched: 15 December 1909
- Fate: Foundered on 11 March 1924

General characteristics
- Tonnage: 3,730.54 GRT; 3,036.21 NRT
- Displacement: 10,000 short tons (9,100 metric tons) approx.
- Length: 450 ft (140 m) overall; 350 ft (110 m) on deck; 329.5 ft (100.4 m) between perpendiculars
- Beam: 50.1 ft (15.3 m)
- Draught: 30.4 ft (9.3 m)
- Depth of hold: 33 ft (10 m)
- Propulsion: Sail
- Sail plan: six-masted schooner: 22 sails: 6 gaff main sails (No. 1 to 5 of equal size, spanker sail of larger size), 6 gaff topsails, 5 staysails, 5 foresails with 39,826.8 sq ft (3,700 m²) sail area
- Speed: 16 knots (30 km/h; 18 mph)
- Complement: 13 (last voyage), 16 (captain, 1st & 2nd mates, engineer, cook, cabin boy, 7 - 10 ABs)

Wyoming was an American wooden six-masted schooner built and completed in 1909 by the Percy & Small Shipyard in Bath, Maine. With a length of 450 ft (140 m) from jib-boom tip to spanker boom tip, Wyoming was the largest known wooden ship ever built.

Because of her extreme length and wood construction, Wyoming tended to flex in heavy seas, which would cause the long planks to twist and buckle, thereby allowing sea water to intrude into the hold. Wyoming had to use pumps to keep her hold relatively free of water. In March 1924, she foundered in heavy seas and sank near Cape Cod with the loss of all hands.

== Description ==
Wyoming was designed by Bant Hanson with Miles M. Merry, the master builder for the North American Atlantic coastal trade, for the company Percy & Small and the intended cargo being coal.

Wyoming was 450 ft (140 m) overall, 350 ft (110 m) on deck, and 329.5 feet (100.4 m) between perpendiculars. It was 50 ft 1 in (15.27 m) wide, and had a draft of 30 ft 5 in (9.27 m). Her gross register tonnage (GRT) was 3730, equivalent to an internal volume of 373,000 cubic feet (10,600 m^{3}). Her net register tonnage (NRT) was 3036, representing a cargo capacity of 303,600 cubic feet (8,600 m^{3}) after subtracting the volume consumed by the helm and crew quarters and other areas not suitable for cargo. She had a deadweight tonnage (DWT) of 6,004 long tons, that is, the weight of the ship fully loaded, including the crew, cargo (6,000 tons), fuel, water and stores, less the weight of the ship when totally empty (4,000 tons). She could carry 6,000 long tons of coal. Wyoming was built of yellow pine with 6" planking and there were 90 diagonal iron cross-bracings on each side.

Wyoming was equipped with a Hyde anchor windlass and a donkey steam engine to raise and lower sails, haul lines and perform other tasks; the steam engine was not used to power the ship, but permitted her to be sailed with a smaller crew of only 11 hands. She was named for the state of Wyoming, a landlocked state, because Wyoming Governor Bryant Butler Brooks (1907–1921) was one of the investors in the ship, which cost $175,000 in 1909 dollars (approx $5,849,000 US Dollars 2023). Another Percy & Small-built schooner, the five-masted Governor Brooks, was named after Brooks.

== History ==
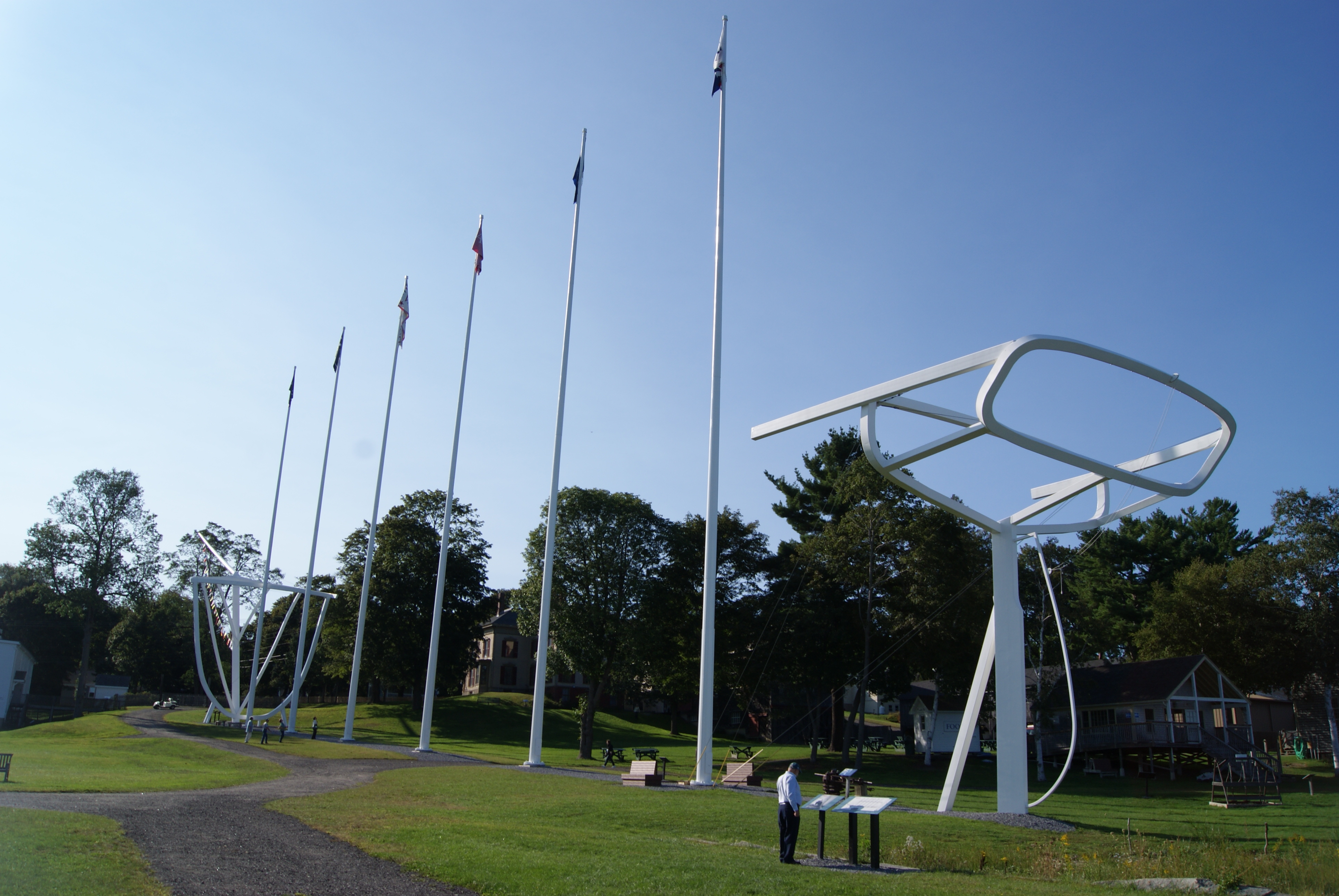
A sculpture representing the Wyoming at the Maine Maritime Museum in Bath, Maine, site of the Percy & Small shipyard where the ship was built.

- 1909 – 15 December. Launched at the Percy & Small Shipyard with her masts stepped. First master: Captain Angus McLeod of Somerville, Massachusetts.
- 1909 – 21 December. Maiden voyage to Newport News, Virginia
- 1916 – In charter of International Paper Company.
- 1917 – April. Sold to France & Canada Steamship Co. for about $350,000 (probably about $420,000). By 1 October 1919, she had earned more than twice that amount, and her owners chartered it to load coal at Norfolk for Genoa at $23.50 per ton.
- 1921 – Sold to Captain A. W. Frost & Co., Portland, Maine.
- 1924 – Left Norfolk, Virginia, commanded by Captain Charles Glaesel, for Saint John, New Brunswick, with a cargo of coal.
- 1924 – 11 March. In order to ride out a nor'easter storm, she anchored off Chatham, Massachusetts, in the Nantucket Sound, together with the five-masted schooner Cora F. Cressey which had left Norfolk at the same time as Wyoming. Captain H. Publicover on the Cora F. Cressey weighed anchor at dusk and stood out to sea. Wyoming is believed to have foundered east of the Pollock Rip Lightship and the crew of 14 was lost.
- 2003 - Wyoming wreck located near Monomoy Island by American Underwater Search and Survey Ltd.
