= Maine Maritime Museum =

Maritime museum in Bath, Maine

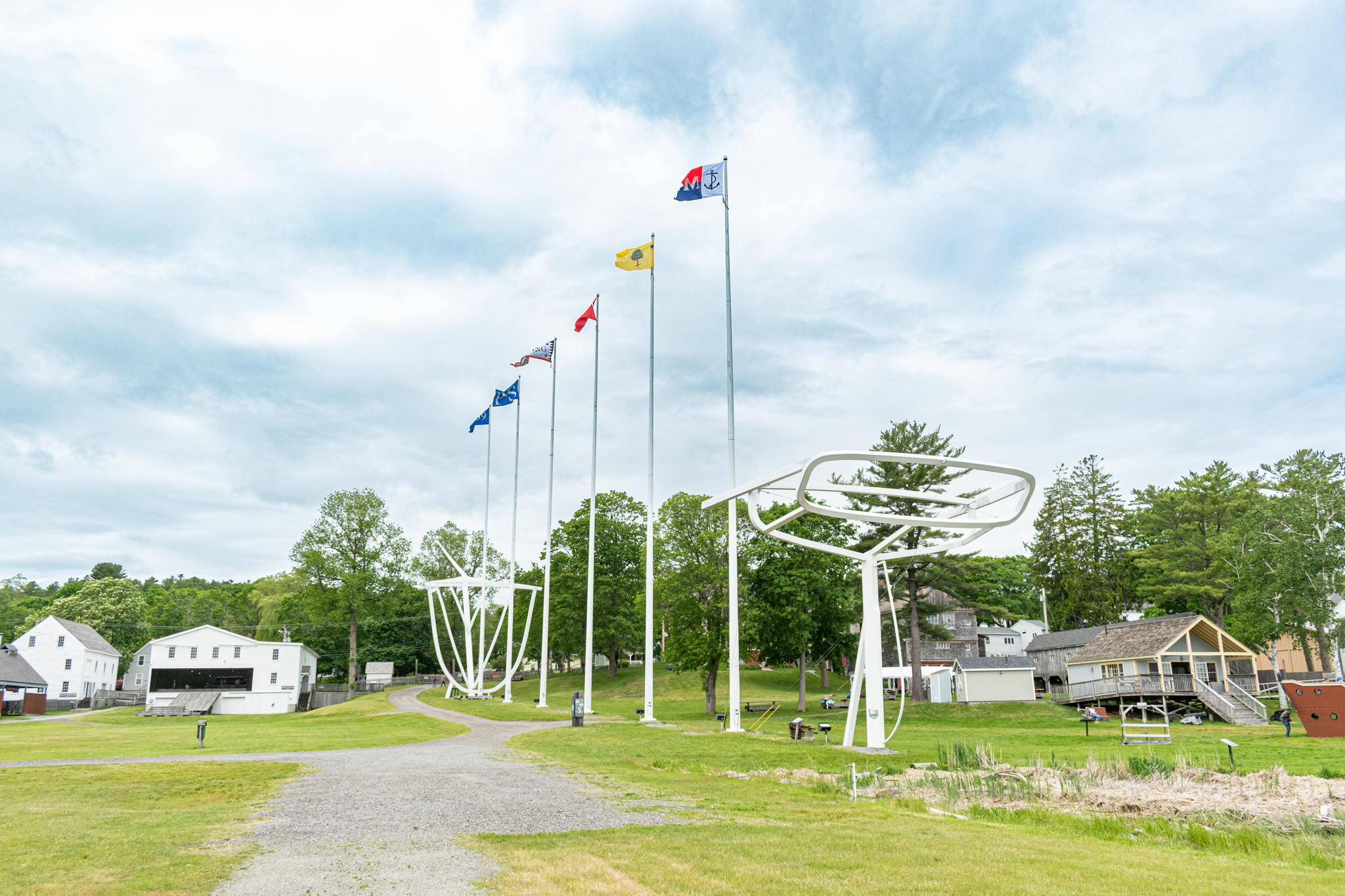
- Former name: Bath Maritime Museum
- Established: 1962
- Location: Bath, Maine, U.S.
- Coordinates: 43.8941°N 69.8168°W
- Type: Maritime museum
- Executive director: Chris Timm
- Curator: Kelly Page
- Website: www.mainemaritimemuseum.org

Maine Maritime Museum, formerly the Bath Marine Museum, offers exhibits about Maine's maritime heritage, culture and the role Maine has played in regional and global maritime activities. Maine Maritime Museum has a large and diverse collection, made up of millions of documents, artifacts and pieces of artwork and includes an extensive research library.

The museum is set on a scenic active waterfront on the banks of the Kennebec River and includes the historic Percy & Small Shipyard with five original 19th-century buildings, a Victorian-era shipyard owner's home and New England's largest sculpture – a full size representation of the largest wooden sailing vessel ever built, the six-masted schooner Wyoming.

== History ==
The Marine Research Society of Bath was founded in 1962 by seven residents from Bath, Maine. The early years saw the founders renting a storefront in 1964 to exhibit the collection. In 1964 one of Bath's wealthy shipbuilding families, the Sewalls, gave the museum their mansion to exhibit the museum's collection.

It was called Bath Marine Museum until 1972 when the name was officially changed to Maine Maritime Museum.

In the 1980s the museum resided in two sites, and a 20-minute ferry transported visitors between the two locations. By 1983, the museum exhibited their collection at three separate sites: Sewall House, the Winter Street Center and the Apprenticeshop.

In 1989, the museum moved permanently to a single campus with the new, three-story, climate-controlled Maritime History Building. Encompassing the historic Percy & Small Shipyard, the new location allowed all museum functions to be in one place for the first time in the organization's history.

In June 2010, due to the Great Recession, the Portland Harbor Museum and Maine Maritime Museum merged. The collection from the Portland Harbor Museum was moved to Maine Maritime Museum on the basis that the Bath museum is a climate-controlled facility and the "premier facility for visitors to experience the history of Maine shipbuilding and seafaring" and the Portland Harbor Museum "received few visitors."

In 2012, the Gazela Primeiro visited the Maine Maritime Museum to commemorate the museum's half-century anniversary.

== Collection ==
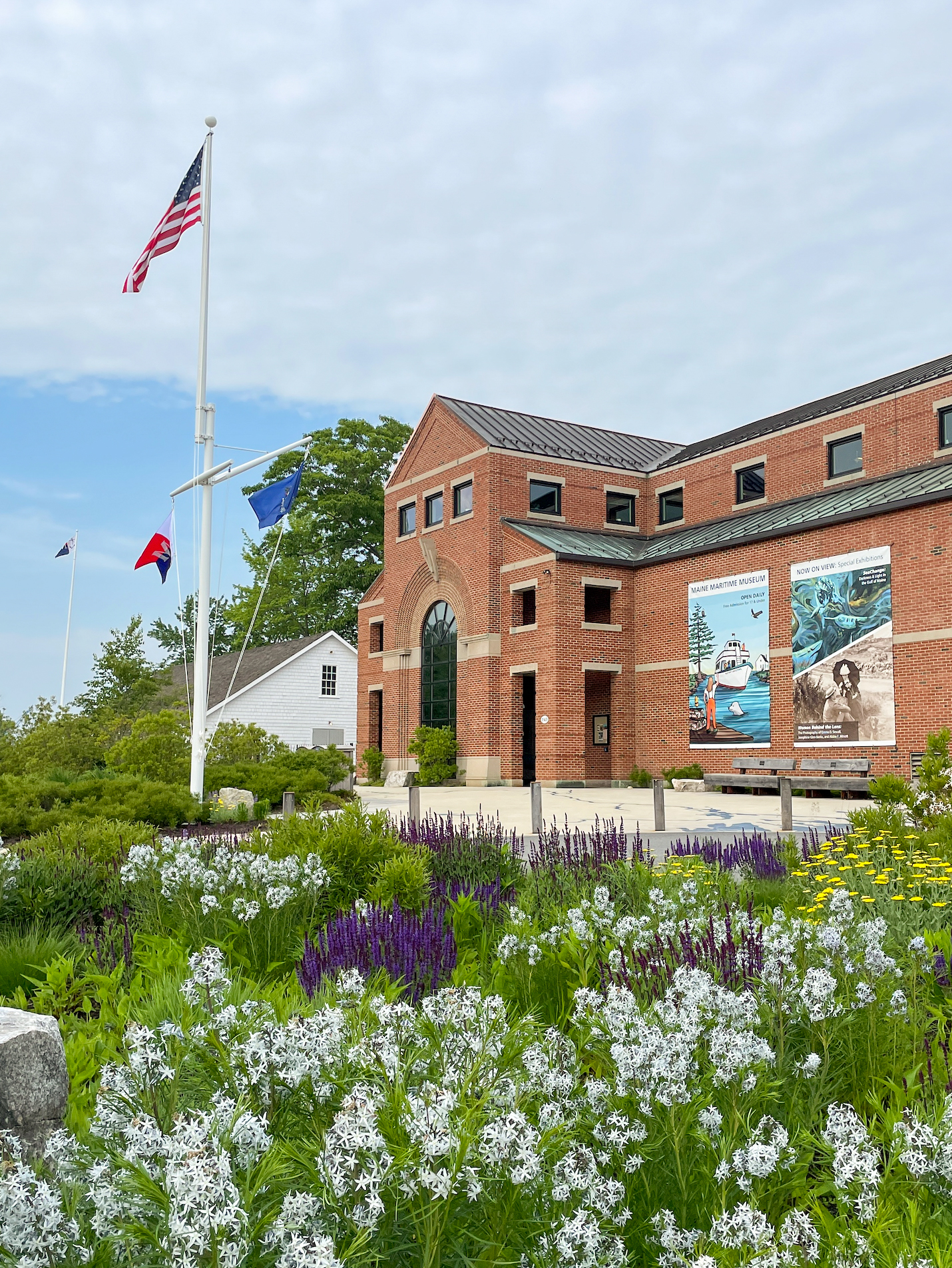
Maine Maritime Museum's main entrance to galleries, docent tours, and the historic Percy & Small Shipyard.

The museum's collection contains more than 20,000 objects and millions of rare documents and manuscripts related to Maine's maritime heritage and its direct global impact, from prehistory to the present. Over the period of 2001 through to 2007 the museum's collection of objects grew from 16,000 to 20,000.

Through the 1980s and 1990s, the institution broadened its scope to include the entirety of Maine's maritime culture. The collection aids exploration of a number of social, political, and cultural themes including how maritime Maine promoted globalization and shaped America's geopolitical role; how Maine families operated their maritime businesses; how Maine's fisheries interact with its economy and ecology; how Maine's coast and inland waterways were promoted as a tourist destination; and how art and craftsmanship has visually defined Maine vessels, Maine people, and Maine's coastal landscape.

Much of the collection is available for research online.

== Exhibits and tours ==
Permanent exhibits on the museum campus include:

- The Donnell House, a restored 1892 home of a shipyard owner
- A Shipyard in Maine: Percy & Small and the Great Schooners, exploring America's only surviving shipyard site where large wooden sailing vessels were built
- BIW: Building America's Navy, produced in collaboration with Bath Iron Works, the exhibit is a high-tech look at the people, processes, and ships of BIW
- Historic Boat Collection, more than 140 iconic Maine-built or Maine-related boats from a rare antique birch bark canoe to Andrew Wyeth’s Friendship sloop.
- Honing the Edge: The Apprenticeshop at 40, a retrospective into the roots of what has become known as the “wooden boat revival.”
- Into the Lantern: A Lighthouse Experience, a full-scale replication of the Cape Elizabeth Two Lights lighthouse tower lantern room, allows visitors to see the original second-order Fresnel lens from the east tower at Two Lights
- Kenneth D. Kramer Blacksmith Shop, a working blacksmith shop evoking the original Percy & Small structure that stood on the site which was razed in 1939
- Lobstering & the Maine Coast, a look at Maine's lobstering industry

During the summer, the museum's flagship schooner the Mary E is also docked. Launched in Bath in 1906, the vessel is the oldest Maine-built fishing schooner still sailing. Mary E is the third and most recent museum property to be added to the National Register of Historic Places, joining the Percy & Small Shipyard and the Donnell House.

Maine Maritime Museum also exhibits a number of temporary, rotating exhibits throughout the year and offers river and coastal cruises and lighthouse tours.

== Campus ==
In 1987 a $7 million construction project to build a new home for the museum one mile from the museum's campus was in progress. Completed in 1989, the new location includes the Percy & Small Shipyard, preserving the nation's only surviving wooden shipbuilding site. Winton Scott Architects designed the current Maine Maritime Museum gallery building. In 1987, Elizabeth B. Noyce donated $3.5 million towards the construction on the museum's building. The building was completed in 1989 to a size of 30,000 square feet. In 2010 it was reported the museum underwent a renovation to address water issues arising out of a design flaw in the roof.

The museum's campus is dominated by a sculpture, designed to evoke the schooner Wyoming, which was the largest wooden vessel ever built in the United States. The Wyoming sank in 1924, but in an effort to connect Maine visitors with the seafaring past and raise the profile of the museum, a full-scale sculptural installation was erected in 2001 to celebrate the ship. At 444 feet long, it is the largest sculpture in New England and is situated on the former ways where the Wyoming was built. In 2001 the museum raised $4 million through donations from the public and spent $300,000 from those funds on the sculpture.

Until 2014, the Grand Banks fishing schooner Sherman Zwicker docked at the museum for tours each summer.

In 2019, the museum broke ground on a $3.3 million project to redesign the south side and arrival areas of the campus. The project includes a complete redevelopment of the front entrance and 5-acre south campus, with a goal of enhancing visitor experience, creating an ecologically friendly and attractive landscape to border the Kennebec River, and increasing physical accessibility.

== Reception ==
In 1983 it was reported that the museum was one of Maine's most popular attractions receiving 30,000 people in 1982. By 2018, visitation had increased to more than 50,000 annually.

Maine Maritime Museum has been recognized as among the top ten maritime museums in the world and was named the best museum in Maine by USA Today in 2018 and 2019.

== See also ==
- List of maritime museums in the United States
- List of museums in Maine
- List of museum ships
- National Register of Historic Places listings in Sagadahoc County, Maine

== Gallery ==
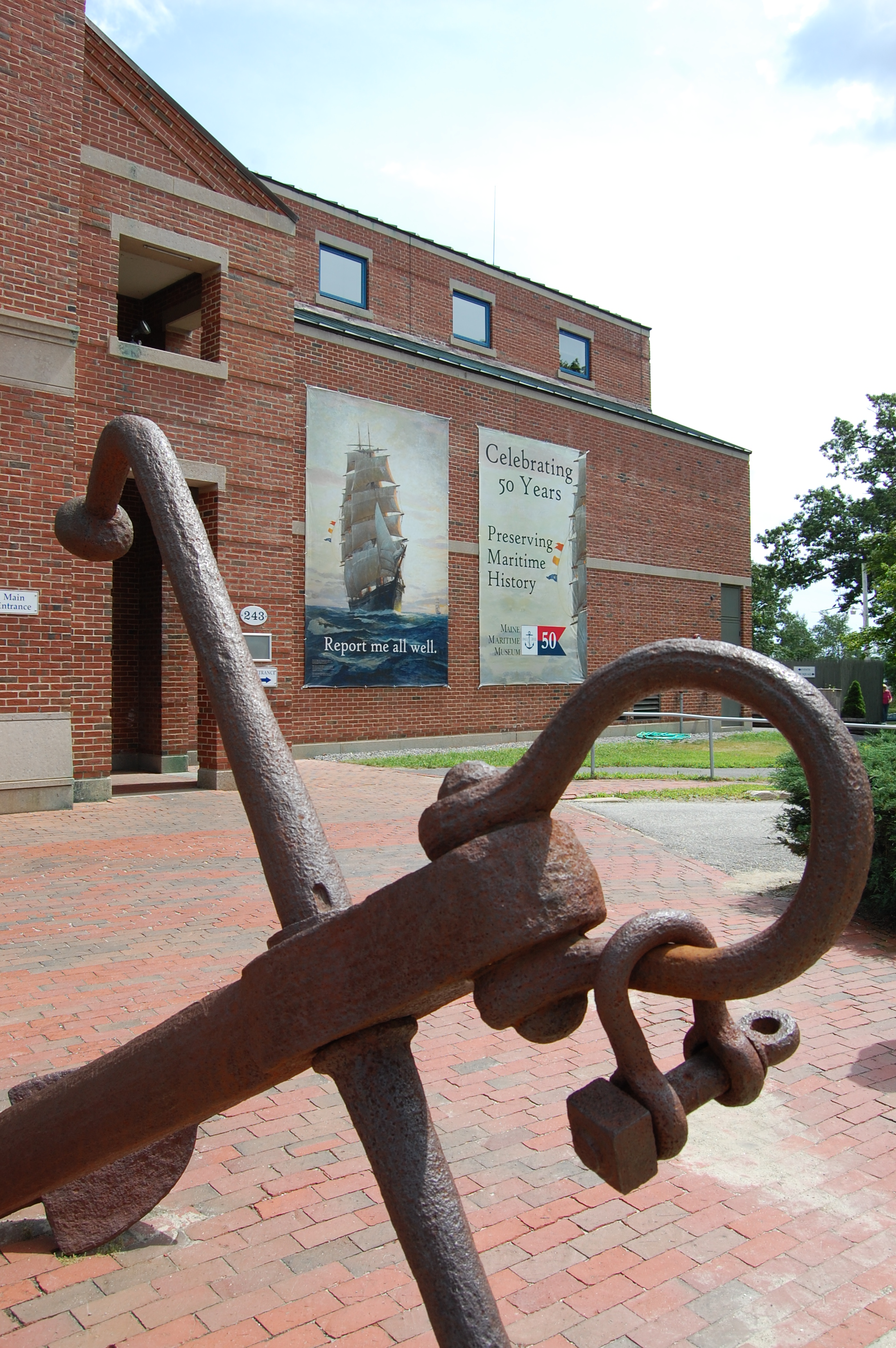
Maine Maritime Museum entry

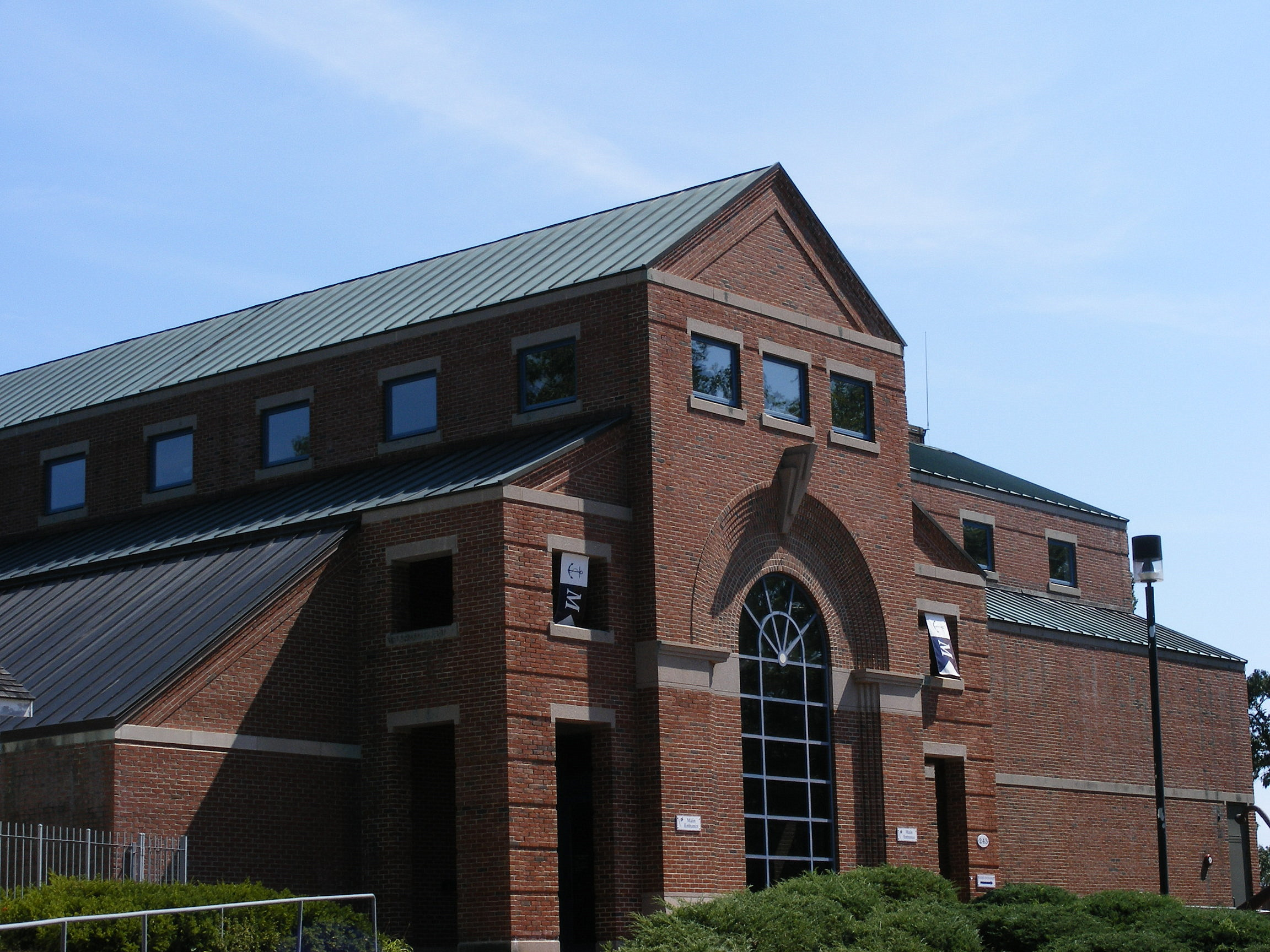
Maine Maritime Museum

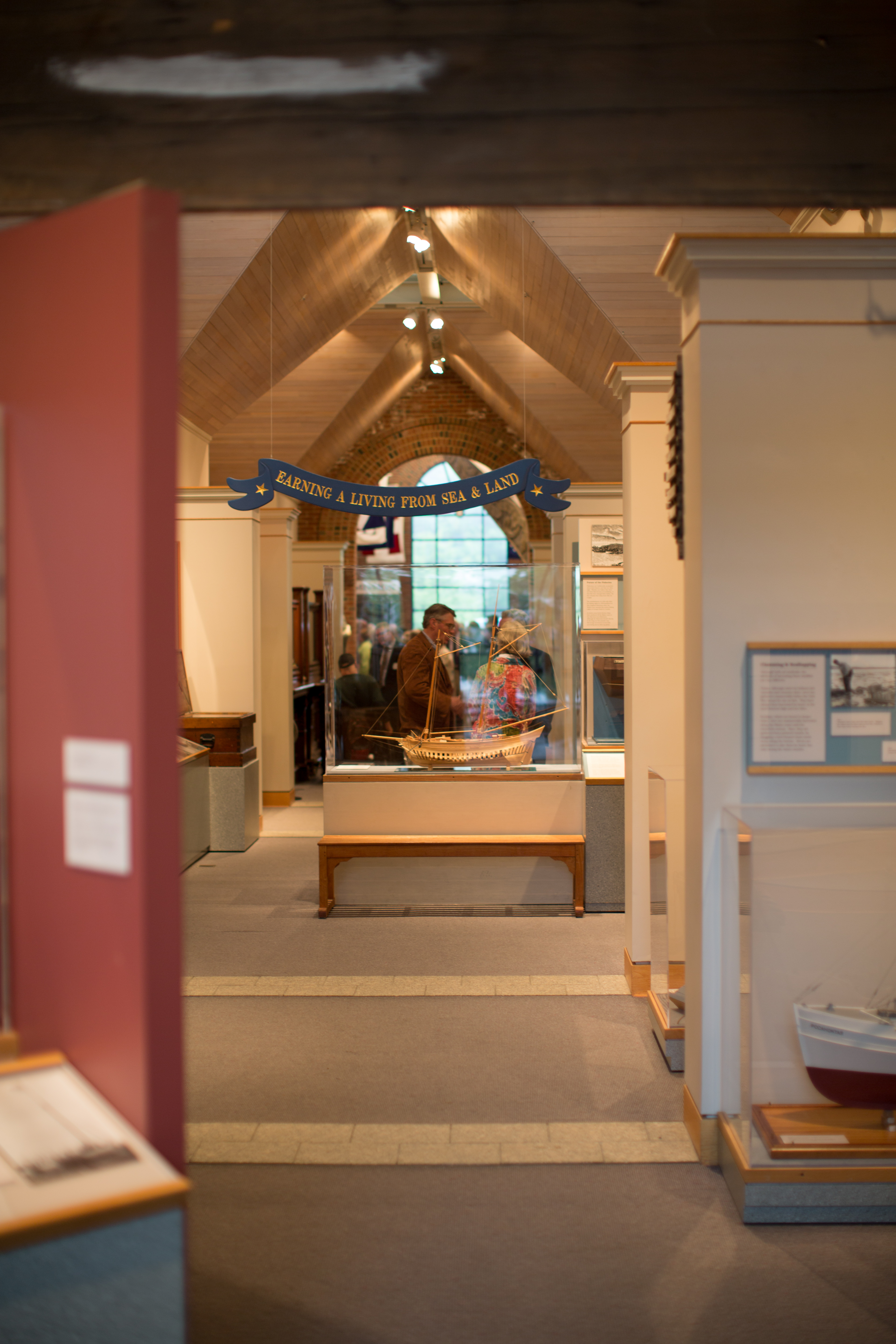

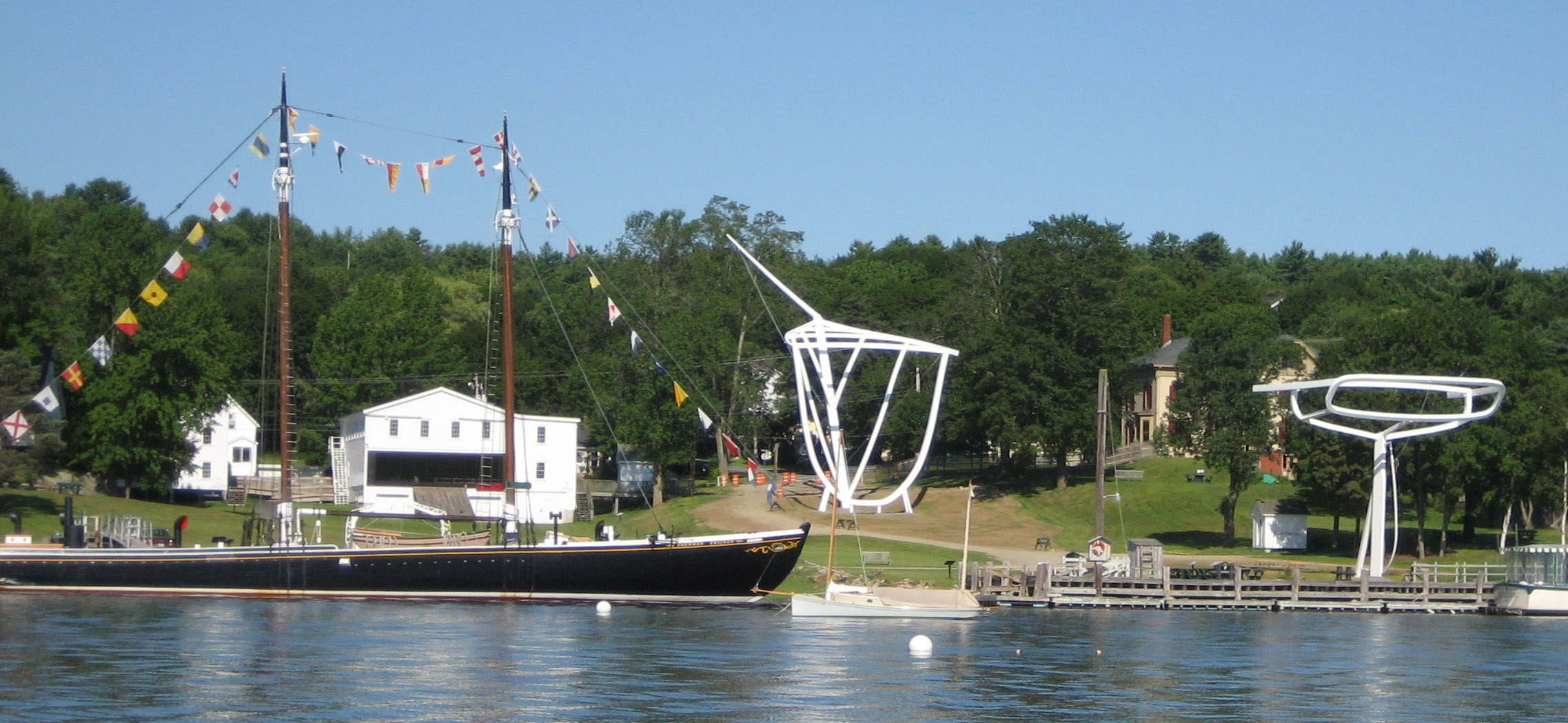
