= Bremen, Maine =

Town in Maine, United States

- Town
- Seal

- Location in Lincoln County and the state of Maine.
- Coordinates: 44°00′20″N 69°23′50″W
- Country: United States
- State: Maine
- County: Lincoln
- Incorporated: February 19, 1828

Area
  - Total: 27.86 sq mi (72.16 km^{2})
  - Land: 16.47 sq mi (42.66 km^{2})
  - Water: 11.39 sq mi (29.50 km^{2})
- Elevation: 3 ft (0.91 m)

Population (2020)
  - Total: 823
  - Density: 50/sq mi (19.3/km^{2})
- Time zone: UTC-5 (Eastern (EST))
  - Summer (DST): UTC-4 (EDT)
- ZIP code: 04551
- Area code: 207
- FIPS code: 23-06855
- GNIS feature ID: 582365
- Website: www.bremenmaine.org

Bremen (/ˈbriːmən/ BREE-mən) is a small town in Lincoln County, Maine, United States. The population was 823 at the 2020 census. Located on Muscongus Bay and the Gulf of Maine, it includes the villages of Broad Cove, Turners Corner, Bremen, Medomak and Muscongus. Hog Island is a center and camp for the Maine chapter of the National Audubon Society.

== History ==
Abenaki tribes once summered on Keene Neck, hunting shellfish and leaving behind shell middens. The area was settled as part of Bristol in 1735 by William Hilton from Plymouth, Massachusetts. Driven off by Indians during the French and Indian Wars, he returned after the 1745 Battle of Louisburg. In May 1755, Hilton and his three sons were ambushed by Indians while getting out of a boat, mortally wounding the father and killing his namesake.

Settled largely by German immigrants, it developed as a farming and fishing community. On February 19, 1828, the town was set off and incorporated, named after Bremen, Germany. Lobstering, clamming and tourism remain important industries.

== Geography ==
According to the United States Census Bureau, the town has a total area of 27.86 square miles (72.16 km^{2}), of which 16.47 square miles (42.66 km^{2}) is land and 11.39 square miles (29.50 km^{2}) is water. Situated on the easterly side of the Pemaquid Peninsula facing Muscongus Bay, Bremen includes Bremen Long Island, Cow Island and Hog Island.

The town is crossed by Maine State Route 32. It borders the towns of Waldoboro to the north, Damariscotta to the west, Bristol to the west and south, and separated by the Medomak River estuary, Friendship to the east.

== Demographics ==
Historical population
| Census | Pop. | Note | %± |
|---|---|---|---|
| 1830 | 770 | | — |
| 1840 | 837 | | 8.7% |
| 1850 | 891 | | 6.5% |
| 1860 | 907 | | 1.8% |
| 1870 | 797 | | −12.1% |
| 1880 | 839 | | 5.3% |
| 1890 | 842 | | 0.4% |
| 1900 | 657 | | −22.0% |
| 1910 | 550 | | −16.3% |
| 1920 | 423 | | −23.1% |
| 1930 | 322 | | −23.9% |
| 1940 | 383 | | 18.9% |
| 1950 | 409 | | 6.8% |
| 1960 | 438 | | 7.1% |
| 1970 | 454 | | 3.7% |
| 1980 | 598 | | 31.7% |
| 1990 | 674 | | 12.7% |
| 2000 | 782 | | 16.0% |
| 2010 | 806 | | 3.1% |
| 2020 | 823 | | 2.1% |
U.S. Decennial Census

=== 2010 census ===
As of the census of 2010, there were 806 people, 353 households, and 238 families living in the town. The population density was 48.9 inhabitants per square mile (18.9/km^{2}). There were 651 housing units at an average density of 39.5 per square mile (15.3/km^{2}). The racial makeup of the town was 99.5% White, 0.1% Asian, and 0.4% from two or more races. Hispanic or Latino of any race were 0.2% of the population.

There were 353 households, of which 23.8% had children under the age of 18 living with them, 56.9% were married couples living together, 5.4% had a female householder with no husband present, 5.1% had a male householder with no wife present, and 32.6% were non-families. 27.5% of all households were made up of individuals, and 15.2% had someone living alone who was 65 years of age or older. The average household size was 2.28 and the average family size was 2.73.

The median age in the town was 50.3 years. 19% of residents were under the age of 18; 4.4% were between the ages of 18 and 24; 18.4% were from 25 to 44; 33% were from 45 to 64; and 25.2% were 65 years of age or older. The gender makeup of the town was 48.6% male and 51.4% female.

=== 2000 census ===
As of the census of 2000, there were 782 people, 327 households, and 236 families living in the town. The population density was 47.4 inhabitants per square mile (18.3/km^{2}). There were 598 housing units at an average density of 36.3 per square mile (14.0/km^{2}). The racial makeup of the town was 98.34% White, 0.77% African American, 0.13% Native American, 0.26% Asian, and 0.51% from two or more races. Hispanic or Latino of any race were 0.64% of the population.

There were 327 households, out of which 23.5% had children under the age of 18 living with them, 61.5% were married couples living together, 7.6% had a female householder with no husband present, and 27.8% were non-families. 22.9% of all households were made up of individuals, and 15.3% had someone living alone who was 65 years of age or older. The average household size was 2.39 and the average family size was 2.76.

In the town, the population was spread out, with 19.3% under the age of 18, 7.3% from 18 to 24, 21.6% from 25 to 44, 31.5% from 45 to 64, and 20.3% who were 65 years of age or older. The median age was 46 years. For every 100 females, there were 96.5 males. For every 100 females age 18 and over, there were 93.0 males.

The median income for a household in the town was $36,167, and the median income for a family was $41,579. Males had a median income of $31,618 versus $24,688 for females. The per capita income for the town was $29,869. About 8.3% of families and 10.5% of the population were below the poverty line, including 16.6% of those under age 18 and 7.6% of those age 65 or over.

== Education ==
The elementary school district is the Great Salt Bay Community School District, while the municipality would be its own school district at the secondary level. Great Salt Bay Community School, a K-8 school, is in Damariscotta.

It was a part of Central Lincoln County School System a.k.a. Alternative Organizational Structure (AOS) 93. On July 21, 2025, Bremen left AOS 93. It formed a regional school unit with Damariscotta and Newcastle.

== Notable people ==
- Richard Hooker, author of M*A*S*H. His family (the Hornberger’s) were among Bremen's original settlers.
- Elizabeth Noyce, philanthropist wife of Intel founder Robert Noyce
- Joshua Soule, bishop
- Samuel Tucker, naval officer
- Clarence Wilkinson, politician
