= List of theaters in Maine =

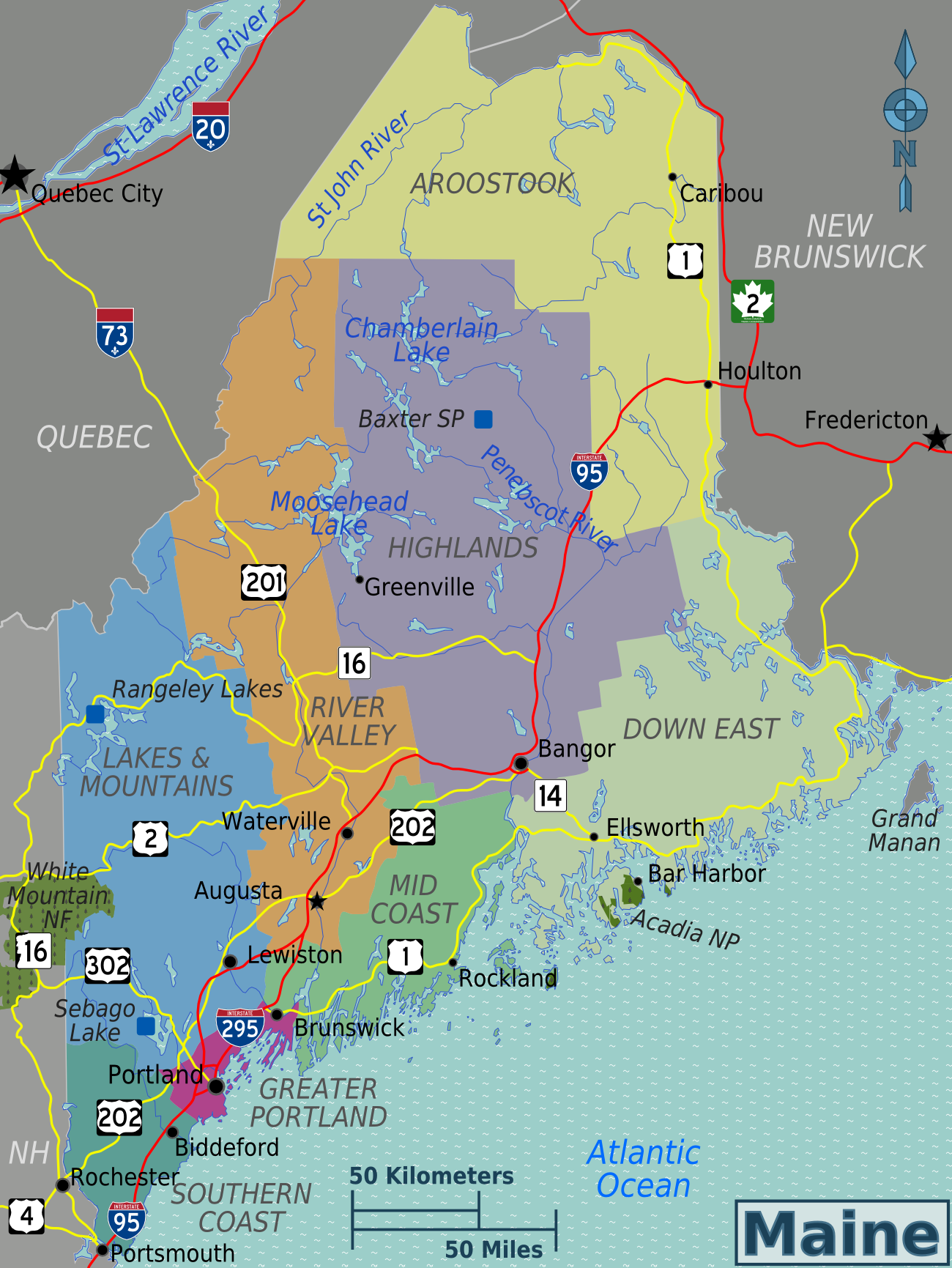

Below is a list of theaters in Maine.

== Aroostook County ==
- University Players at the University of Maine at Presque Isle in Presque Isle, ME

== Down East and Acadia ==
- The Barn Arts Collective in Bass Harbor, ME
- The Grand in Ellsworth, ME
- ImprovAcadia in Bar Harbor, ME
- New Surry Theatre and Performing Arts School in Blue Hill, ME
- Opera House Arts in Stonington, ME
- ISLE Theater Company in Deer Isle, ME

== Greater Portland ==
- 60 Grit Theatre Company in Portland, ME
- Acorn Productions in Portland, ME
- Bare Portland Theater in Portland, ME
- Cast Aside Productions in Portland, ME
- Dramatic Repertory Company in Portland, ME
- Fenix Theatre Company in Portland, ME
- Good Theater in Portland, ME
- Mad Horse Theatre Company in Portland, ME
- Opera Maine in Portland, ME
- Pie Man Theatre Company in South Portland, ME
- Portland Stage Company in Portland, ME
- Snowlion Repertory Company in Portland, ME

== Midcoast ==
- Belfast Maskers in Belfast, ME
- Cold Comfort Theater in Belfast, ME
- Maine State Music Theatre in Brunswick, ME
- Midcoast Actors' Studio in Belfast, ME
- The Colonial Theatre in Belfast, ME
- The Theater Project in Brunswick, ME

== River Valley ==
- Theater at Monmouth in Monmouth, ME
- Waterville Opera House in Waterville, ME
- Johnson Hall Performing Arts Center in Gardiner, ME

== Southern Coast ==
- City Theater in Biddeford, ME
- Hackmatack Playhouse in Berwick, ME
- Ogunquit Playhouse in Ogunquit, ME

== Highlands ==
- Penobscot Theatre Company in Bangor, ME
- True North Theatre in Orono, ME

== Lakes and mountains (south Paris etc) ==
- Celebration Barn Theater in South Paris, ME
- The Public Theatre in Lewiston, ME
