= Sedgwick, Maine =

Town in Maine, United States

- Town
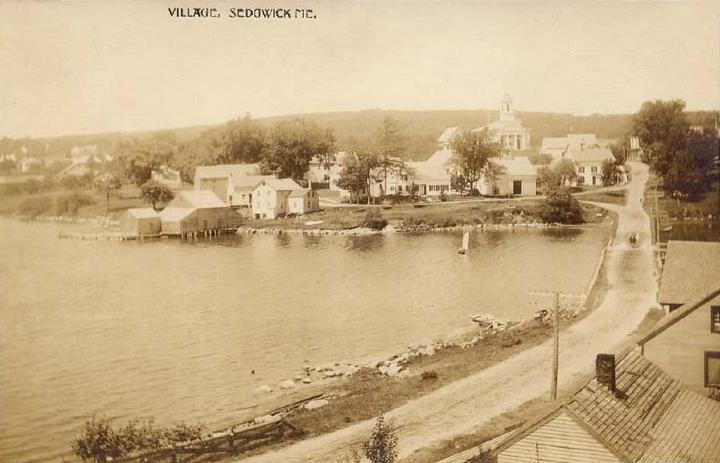
- View of the village in 1909

- Seal

- Location within Maine Location within the United States
- Coordinates: 44°22′20″N 68°37′53″W
- Country: United States
- State: Maine
- County: Hancock
- Incorporated: 1789
- Villages: Sedgwick; North Sedgwick; Sargentville

Area
  - Total: 31.06 sq mi (80.45 km^{2})
  - Land: 26.99 sq mi (69.90 km^{2})
  - Water: 4.07 sq mi (10.54 km^{2})
- Elevation: 197 ft (60 m)

Population (2020)
  - Total: 1,202
  - Density: 45/sq mi (17.2/km^{2})
- Time zone: UTC-5 (Eastern (EST))
  - Summer (DST): UTC-4 (EDT)
- ZIP Codes: 04676 (Sedgwick); 04673 (Sargentville)
- Area code: 207
- FIPS code: 23-67300
- GNIS feature ID: 582721
- Website: www.sedgwickmaine.org

Sedgwick is a town in Hancock County, Maine, United States. The population was 1,202 at the 2020 census. The town includes the village of Sargentville.

== History ==
It was one of six contiguous townships, each six miles square, granted by Massachusetts in 1761 to David Marsh and 359 others. Called by its Abenaki name Naskeag, meaning "the end or extremity," its first permanent European settler was Andrew Black in 1759. In 1789, the town was incorporated as Sedgwick, named after Major Robert Sedgwick, who in 1654 captured nearby Fort Pentagouet (now Castine) from the French.

In 1817, land was taken from the township to form Brooksville, with more taken in 1849 to form Brooklin. By 1859, the population was 1,235.

Farmers found the surface broken and ledgy, better suited for grazing than cultivation. Gristmills and sawmills were built along various streams, including the Benjamin River. Because of the geology, for decades Sedgwick had operating many granite quarries, where stone was taken for major public buildings. Most of the quarries have been abandoned. Two companies mined for argentiferous galena, a source of silver. But with two excellent harbors, the town was chiefly occupied by fishing, clam digging, shipbuilding and seafaring. Other businesses included tanning and barrel making.

In March 2011, Sedgwick received attention after passing an ordinance declaring food sovereignty for the town's citizens.

== Geography ==
According to the United States Census Bureau, the town has a total area of 31.06 square miles (80.45 km^{2}), of which 26.99 square miles (69.90 km^{2}) is land and 4.07 square miles (10.54 km^{2}) is water. Drained by the Benjamin River, which separates it from Brooklin, Sedgwick overlooks Penobscot Bay. The Deer Isle Bridge spans the Eggemoggin Reach, connecting Sedgwick to the towns of Deer Isle and Stonington.

The town is crossed by state routes 15, 172, 175 and 176.

=== Climate ===
This climatic region is typified by large seasonal temperature differences, with warm to hot (and often humid) summers and cold (sometimes severely cold) winters. According to the Köppen Climate Classification system, Sedgwick has a humid continental climate, abbreviated "Dfb" on climate maps.

== Demographics ==
Historical population
Census	Pop.	Note	%±
1790	569		—
1800	760		33.6%
1810	1,352		77.9%
1820	1,420		5.0%
1830	1,604		13.0%
1840	1,922		19.8%
1850	1,235		−35.7%
1860	1,263		2.3%
1870	1,113		−11.9%
1880	1,128		1.3%
1890	1,012		−10.3%
1900	902		−10.9%
1910	909		0.8%
1920	830		−8.7%
1930	699		−15.8%
1940	718		2.7%
1950	614		−14.5%
1960	574		−6.5%
1970	578		0.7%
1980	795		37.5%
1990	905		13.8%
2000	1,102		21.8%
2010	1,196		8.5%
2020	1,202		0.5%
U.S. Decennial Census

=== 2010 census ===
As of the census of 2010, there were 1,196 people, 529 households, and 344 families living in the town. The population density was 44.3 inhabitants per square mile (17.1/km^{2}). There were 800 housing units at an average density of 29.6 per square mile (11.4/km^{2}). The racial makeup of the town was 98.4% White, 0.3% African American, 0.2% Native American, 0.5% Asian, 0.3% from other races, and 0.3% from two or more races. Hispanic or Latino of any race were 1.8% of the population.

There were 529 households, of which 26.3% had children under the age of 18 living with them, 50.7% were married couples living together, 9.3% had a female householder with no husband present, 5.1% had a male householder with no wife present, and 35.0% were non-families. 29.3% of all households were made up of individuals, and 11.7% had someone living alone who was 65 years of age or older. The average household size was 2.26 and the average family size was 2.73.

The median age in the town was 45.9 years. 20.2% of residents were under the age of 18; 6.7% were between the ages of 18 and 24; 21.4% were from 25 to 44; 32.5% were from 45 to 64; and 19.1% were 65 years of age or older. The gender makeup of the town was 49.6% male and 50.4% female.

=== 2000 census ===
As of the census of 2000, there were 1,102 people, 470 households, and 307 families living in the town. The population density was 40.8 inhabitants per square mile (15.8/km^{2}). There were 671 housing units at an average density of 24.8 per square mile (9.6/km^{2}). The racial makeup of the town was 96.64% White, 0.18% African American, 0.73% Native American, 0.36% Asian, 0.18% from other races, and 1.91% from two or more races. Hispanic or Latino of any race were 1.09% of the population.

There were 470 households, out of which 29.4% had children under the age of 18 living with them, 55.3% were married couples living together, 7.0% had a female householder with no husband present, and 34.5% were non-families. 29.4% of all households were made up of individuals, and 13.0% had someone living alone who was 65 years of age or older. The average household size was 2.34 and the average family size was 2.93.

In the town, the population was spread out, with 25.0% under the age of 18, 6.4% from 18 to 24, 25.2% from 25 to 44, 27.6% from 45 to 64, and 15.9% who were 65 years of age or older. The median age was 40 years. For every 100 females, there were 100.7 males. For every 100 females age 18 and over, there were 96.9 males.

The median income for a household in the town was $35,000, and the median income for a family was $40,547. Males had a median income of $26,607 versus $21,944 for females. The per capita income for the town was $19,772. About 6.9% of families were below the poverty line.

== Education ==
It is in the Sedgwick School District. Sedgwick Elementary School is the town's grade school, and it is a part of School Union 76.

In 1980, Sedgwick had a public elementary school up to grade 1, and then most students in Sedgwick attended an elementary school in Brooklin. The town government paid for education of its students in other schools, public and private.

Sedgwick pays George Stevens Academy, a private school, to educate its students at the high school level. Sedgwick High School closed in 1943, with students from that point sent to GSA.

The Alternative School, a private K-8 school, opened in September 1980. In 1981, the enrollment was 15, with all students from Segdwick, with the town paying tuition.

== Notable people ==
- Doris Grumbach, novelist, biographer, literary critic and essayist
- Thomas N. Schroth, editor of Congressional Quarterly, founder of The National Journal
- Stan Waterman, Emmy-winning cinematographer and underwater-film producer
- James Russell Wiggins, US representative to the United Nations
