= Frederick Law Olmsted Summer Home =

Historic house in Maine, United States

- U.S. National Register of Historic Places
- Location within Maine Location within the United States
- Nearest city: Sunset, Maine
- Coordinates: 44°10′43″N 68°43′5″W
- Area: 2 acres (0.81 ha)
- Built: 1897
- Architect: William Ralph Emerson
- Architectural style: Shingle Style
- NRHP reference No.: 76000089
- Added to NRHP: November 7, 1976

The Frederick Law Olmsted Summer Home, also known as Felsted, is a historic house in the town of Deer Isle, Maine. It is located on the west side of the same-named island, south of the village of Sunset. Designed by William Ralph Emerson and built in 1897, it was for one year the summer home of the famous landscape architect Frederick Law Olmsted in a bid to improve his failing mental health. Olmsted, then retired and severely affected by senility, was later committed McLean Hospital in Massachusetts, where he died in 1903. The house is a high-quality example of Shingle style architecture; it was listed on the National Register of Historic Places in 1976.

== Description and history ==
The Olmsted house is perched on rocky crag above a cove on the west side of a peninsular lobe of Deer Isle south of the village of Sunset. It is a 2 1/2-story wood-frame structure, roughly T-shaped, with a hip roof across its main block and a gable section that projects over the rocky shore. The house rests in part on a fieldstone foundation and in part directly on the bedrock of the shore. The house is characterized by numerous porches, gables, dormers, and projecting sections, with expansive use of windows to give fine views accorded by its location.

The impetus for the house's construction came from Frederick Law Olmsted's wife Mary. The Olmsted had traveled to England in a bid to combat his increasing senility, but he became depressed by the English climate. Mary asked their son Frederick Jr. to build them a summer retirement home in Maine. The younger Olmsted retained Boston architect William Ralph Emerson, already noted for his Shingle style designs and work in Maine, to design the house, which was built in 1897. His plans included landscape work which was intended to stimulate the elder Olmsted's decreasing mental faculties. The Olmsteds moved in during 1897, but he was not happy, and his condition continued to deteriorate. The following year he was committed to McLean Hospital in Massachusetts, where he died in 1903.

== See also ==
- National Register of Historic Places listings in Hancock County, Maine
