= Marvin Merritt IV =

Maine theater professional (born 1998)

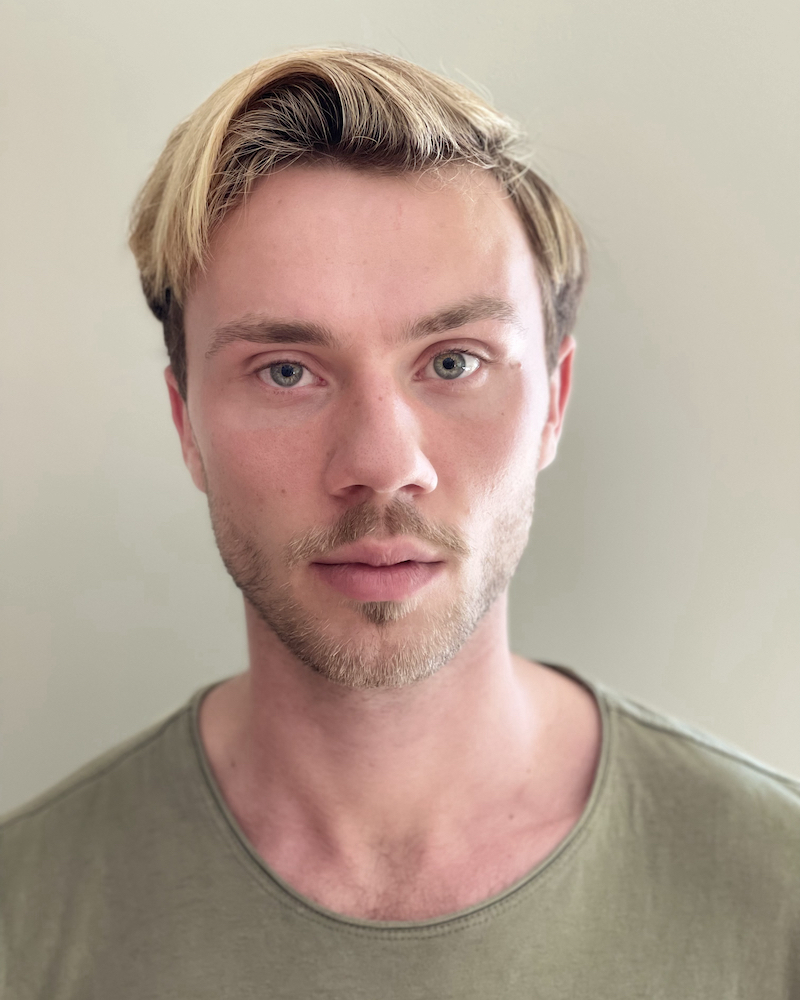
- Born: Marvin Lawrence Merritt IV; August 26, 1998 (age 28); Deer Isle, Maine, U.S.
- Education: Harvard College
- Occupations: Actor, theatre director
- Website: marvinmerritt.com

Marvin Merritt IV (born August 26, 1998) is an American director and theater professional from Deer Isle, Maine. He founded ISLE Theater Company and is the Artistic & Executive Director.

== Education ==
Merritt has trained internationally at the London Academy of Music and Dramatic Art, the AST National Academy of Theatre Arts in Kraków, and the Moscow Art Theatre School. In 2020, he graduated from Harvard University with a Bachelor of Arts in Theater, Dance and Media.

== Career ==
As an actor, he has collaborated with Opera House Arts at the Stonington Opera House in The Tempest and the Maine premiere of Shakespeare in Love, The Goat Exchange in WOYZECK/GALILEO, and Witness Relocation in The One You Feed.

== See also ==
- List of American actors
- List of Harvard University people
- List of people from Maine
