= ISLE Theater Company =

Theater company in Maine

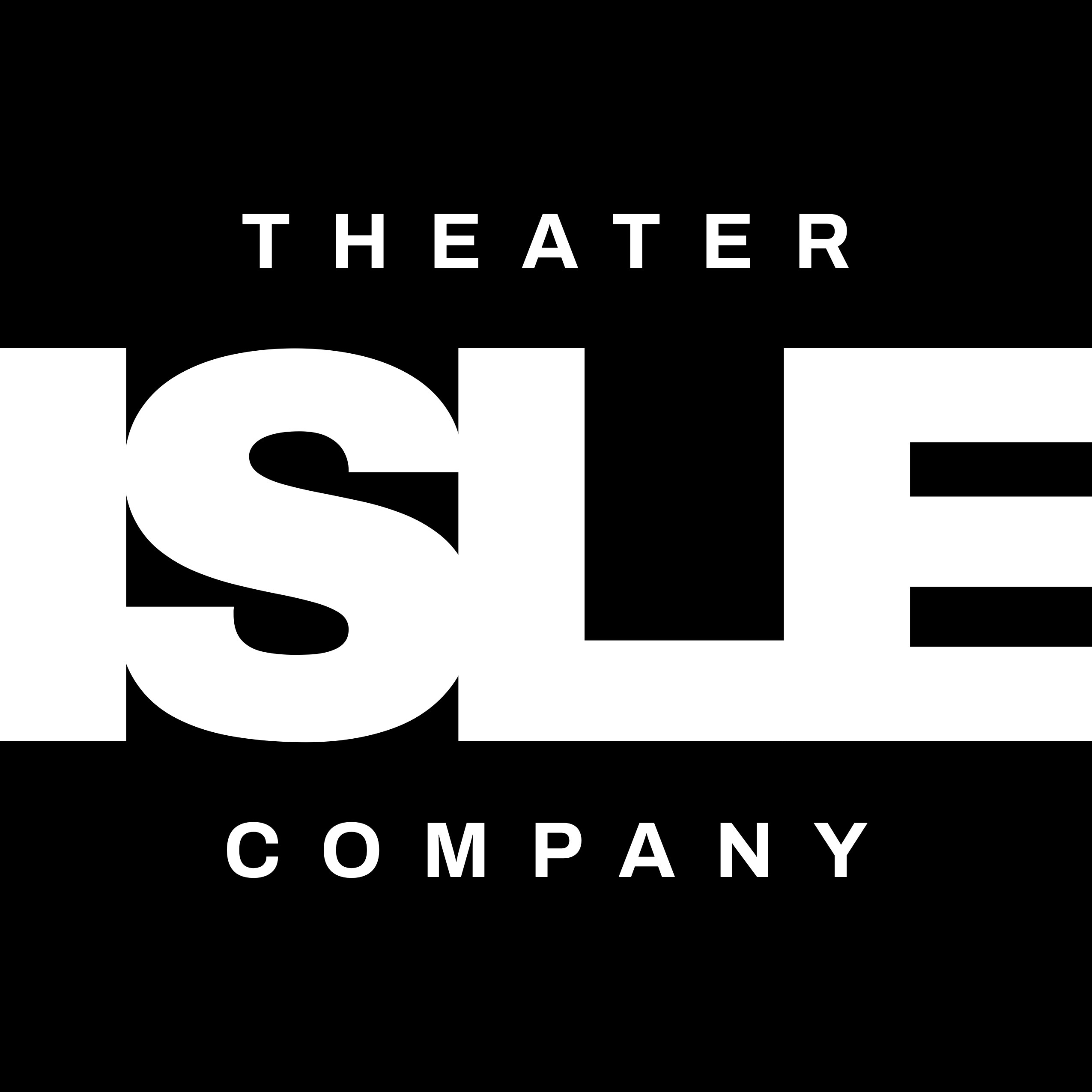
- Type: 501(c)(3) non-profit
- Tax ID: 87-2818480
- Founded: 2020 (6 years ago) in Deer Isle, Maine
- Founders: Anna Fitzgerald, Marvin Merritt IV
- Artistic & Executive Director: Marvin Merritt IV
- Affiliate Artists: Aislinn Brophy, Ruva Chigwedere, Anna Fitzgerald
- Website: isletheater.org

ISLE Theater Company ("ISLE") is a Maine-based 501(c)(3) non-profit organization known for creating original, community-driven theater productions.

== History ==
Founded in 2020 by Anna Fitzgerald and Marvin Merritt IV, ISLE Theater Company began on Deer Isle after its two founders graduated from Harvard University and sought to make safe, accessible theater in the midst of the coronavirus pandemic. Merritt serves as the Artistic & Executive Director.

In their first year, ISLE Theater Company produced two shows: Rajiv Joseph's Gruesome Playground Injuries at Moss Ledge Cottage, an oceanfront cottage overlooking Penobscot Bay, and Anna Fitzgerald's Do Not Move Stones at the Settlement Quarry Preserve, a defunct granite quarry in Stonington, ME where they reached over one thousand people over three evenings. ISLE received ten BroadwayWorld Maine awards in 2021 including "Best Production of the Year" and "Best Play."

In 2022, ISLE Theater Company announced the world premiere of Anna Fitzgerald's Playing Mercury, a medieval-period comedy inspired by William Shakespeare's As You Like It with outdoor performances at Horsepower Farm in Penobscot in August and released for digital on-demand in September.
