= Salome Sellers House =

Historic house

- U.S. National Register of Historic Places
- Location within Maine Location within the United States
- Location: 416 Sunset Rd. (SR 15A), Deer Isle, Maine
- Coordinates: 44°11′57″N 68°42′17″W
- Area: 0.5 acres (0.20 ha)
- Built: 1772; 254 years ago
- Architect: Sellers, Joseph
- Architectural style: Cape Cod Farmhouse
- NRHP reference No.: 83004189
- Added to NRHP: January 27, 1983

The Salome Sellers House is a historic house museum at 416 Sunset Road (Maine State Route 15A) in Deer Isle, Maine. Its oldest portion dating to the 1770s, the house is locally distinctive as a well-preserved 19th-century Cape, and as the home of Salome Sellers, one of Deer Isle's longest-lived residents (1800-1909). The house has been a museum property of the Deer Isle-Stonington Historical Society since 1960, and is believed to be the only house of its type in the state that is open as a museum. It was listed on the National Register of Historic Places in 1983.

== Description and history ==
The Sellers House stands on the east side of Maine Route 15A (Sunset Road) in southern Deer Isle, a short way north of the Island Country Club. It is a 1 1/2-story wood-frame Cape style house, five bays wide, with a side-gable roof, clapboard siding, granite foundation, and a central chimney. A recessed ell extends to the right. The centered entrance is topped by a four-light transom window. The interior follows a typical center-chimney plan, with a narrow entry vestibule with winding staircase, parlor and dining room to the sides of the chimney, and kitchen behind, with bedrooms in the rear corners and in the upper half story. Woodwork is relatively simple, except in the parlor, where there are some Greek Revival touches, and the kitchen fireplace includes a Dutch oven. Floors are of pine, and the walls are plastered or simply wallpapered. The ell includes a summer kitchen and a toolshed.

The ell was the first portion of the house to be built, dating to between 1772 and 1817. The main house frame was erected in 1830 by a man named Judkins for Joseph Sellers, who owned the house and finished it. The house remained in the Sellers family until it was sold to the historical society in 1961. For most of that period it was home to Salome Sellers, a noted local personality who died in 1909 at the age of 108, and was one of the community's most long-lived residents. The house includes original Sellers furnishings and artifacts, and has retained much of its original construction, including hand-blown glass window panes and woodwork. The house has undergone major rehabilitative work in 1960 and 2000.

== See also ==
- National Register of Historic Places listings in Hancock County, Maine
