= Deer Isle (island) =

Small island in Maine

Coordinates: 44°12′36″N 68°41′07″W

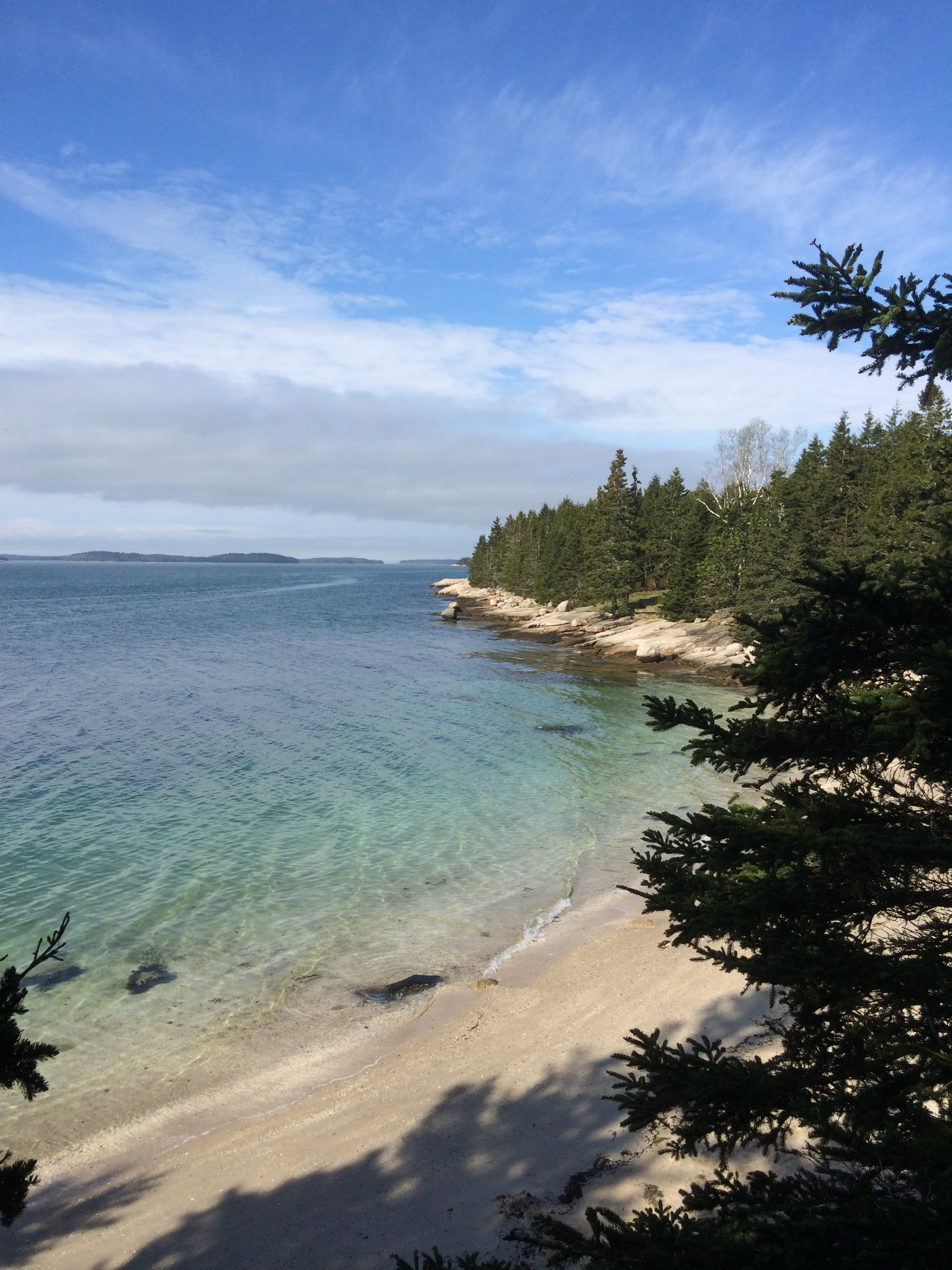
A beach on Deer Isle

Deer Isle is an island in Hancock County, Maine, United States. There are two communities on the island, Deer Isle and Stonington. It is on the eastern side of Penobscot Bay, connected by road to the Maine mainland through Little Deer Isle. Its only vehicular connection to the mainland is State Route 15 over Deer Isle Bridge.

== Geography ==
According to the United States Census Bureau, the town of Deer Isle has a total area of 123.67 square miles (320.30 km^{2}), of which 29.72 square miles (76.97 km^{2}) is land and 93.95 square miles (243.33 km^{2}) is water. The town is separated from the mainland by Eggemoggin Reach and may be reached by car via Deer Isle Bridge. The town includes other nearby islands, including Little Deer Isle.

According to the United States Census Bureau, the town of Stonington has a total area of 37.84 square miles (98.01 km^{2}), of which 9.81 square miles (25.41 km^{2}) is land and 28.03 square miles (72.60 km^{2}) is water. Located on the southern end of Deer Isle, Stonington is situated in Penobscot Bay and the Gulf of Maine, part of the Atlantic Ocean. Stonington is the terminus of Maine State Route 15, which passes through the town of Deer Isle and across the Deer Isle Bridge to the mainland.

== See also ==
- List of islands of Maine
- List of islands of the United States by area
