= David B. Steinman =

American civil engineer

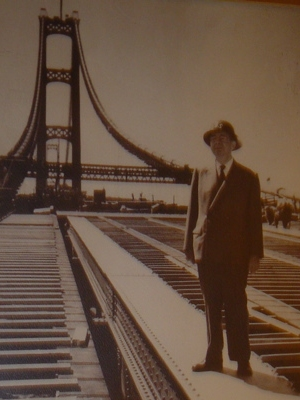
- Steinman on the Mackinac Bridge.
- Born: June 11, 1886
- Died: August 21, 1960 (aged 74); Manhattan, New York, U.S.
- Education: City College of New York; Columbia University
- Spouse: Irene Hoffmann (m. 1915)
- Children: 3
- Engineering career
- Projects: Henry Hudson Bridge; Mackinac Bridge
- Awards: Louis E. Levy Medal (1957)

David Barnard Steinman (June 11, 1886 – August 21, 1960) was an American civil engineer. He was the designer of the Mackinac Bridge and many other notable bridges, and a published author. He grew up in New York City's lower Manhattan, and lived with the ambition of making his mark on the Brooklyn Bridge that he lived under. In 1906 he earned a bachelor's degree from City College and in 1909, a Master of Arts from Columbia University and a Doctorate in 1911. He also received an honorary Doctor of Science in Engineering on 15 April 1952 from degree mill Sequoia University, but would distance himself from it soon after a 1957 inquiry raised doubts over its legitimacy, and did not mention the qualifications in his biographies. He was awarded the Franklin Institute's Louis E. Levy Medal in 1957.

David B. Steinman built bridges in the United States, Thailand, England, Portugal, Italy, Brazil, Haiti, Puerto Rico, Canada, Korea, Iraq and Pakistan. He had a literary bent, and was a published author with several books, articles in advancement of his craft, and even had children's books and poetry to his credit.

== Early life ==
Steinman was the child of Jewish immigrants. Little is known of his family and early childhood other than that he had 6 siblings. There is some controversy about where and when he was born. Some sources have him born in Chomsk (Хомск חומסק), Brest, Belarus in 1886, and emigrating to the United States with his family in 1890. However other sources, including Ratigan, and Steinman himself have him born in New York in 1887.

Steinman grew up in New York City, New York, and was raised in the shadows of the Brooklyn Bridge. The Williamsburg Bridge was constructed as he grew up. The late Nineteenth and early Twentieth centuries were a time of significant bridge construction in the area, and he later said this is where he got his first interest in bridges.

Because his family had little money, he worked to put himself through both the City College of New York, graduating summa cum laude in 1906 and then Columbia University, where he completed three additional degrees culminating in a PhD in Civil Engineering. His PhD thesis was on a steel truss arch design for the Henry Hudson Bridge. While he was attending Columbia he did fellowships as well as teaching nighttime classes at the City College and Stuyvesant Evening High School. He accepted a teaching position at the University of Idaho in Moscow, Idaho (1910–1914) but longed to return to New York.

== Start at bridge building ==
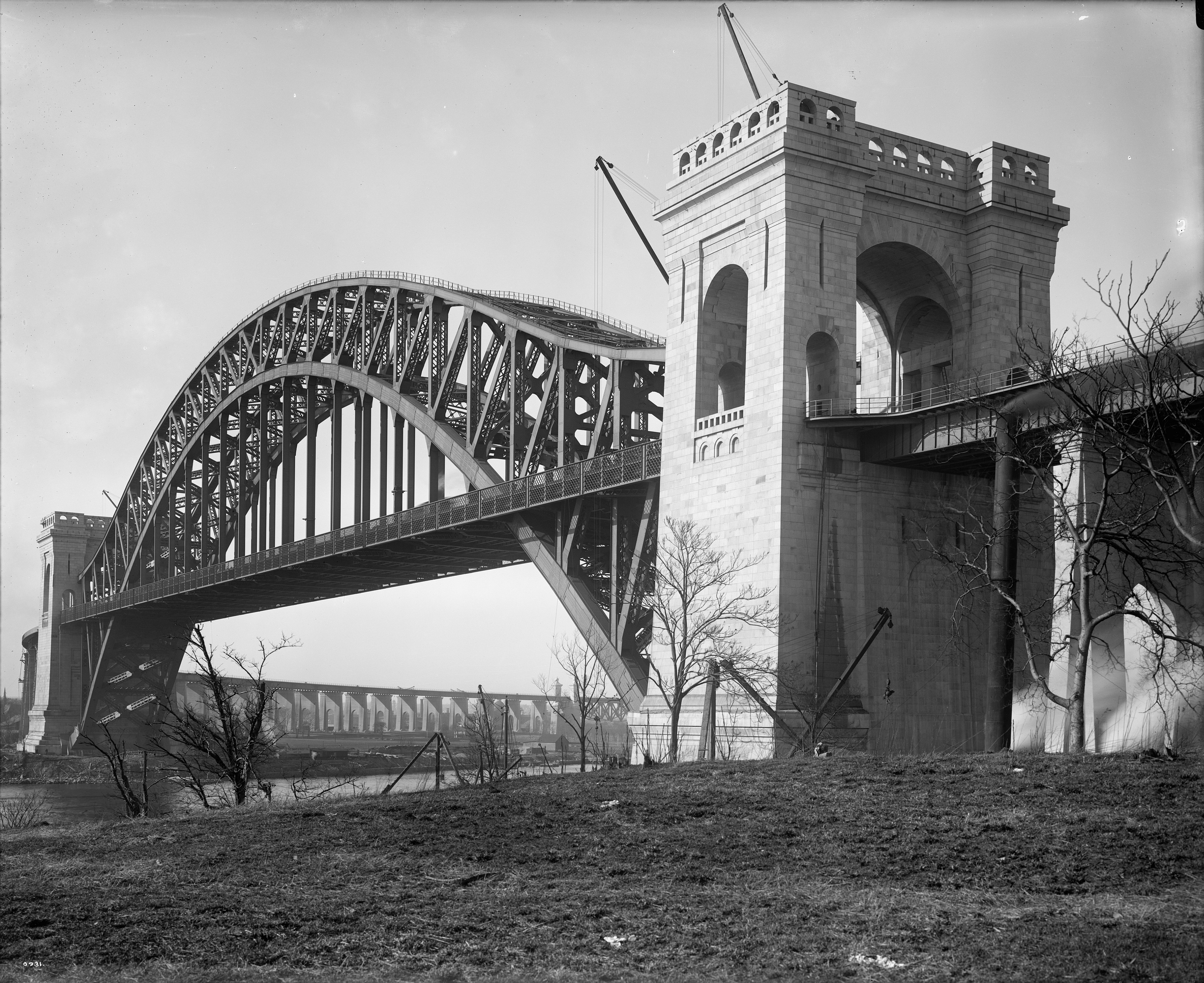
Hell Gate, NYC, NY, arch, as it looked in 1917

After contacting Gustav Lindenthal about working on the Hell Gate Bridge, he returned to New York City to become a special assistant to Lindenthal, along with Othmar Ammann of Switzerland, another young bridge builder. It was said this experience of working together led to their 40-year professional rivalry. Pay was typical for the era, 200 USD/month. He received a 1-year leave of absence from the University of Idaho to work on the Hell Gate Bridge. Lindenthal gave his protégés advice about engineering such as, "Steinman, bridge engineering is easy. It is the financial engineering that is hard" (Petroski 327). While working with Lindenthal, Steinman also worked on the Sciotoville Bridge, a crossing of the Ohio River. After this work Steinman sought other employment, working as assistant engineer on the Rondout Creek Bridge, and as an assistant engineer for the New York Central Railroad.

When Steinman was still a young engineer there was economic stress put on building bridges. Because of a poor economy Steinman tried to design his bridges more economically pleasing rather that artistic. Engineers could not find backers for bridge proposals. Bankers added millions of dollars in financing costs even after the most economical design was created. This is one of the reasons that there was little work for bridge engineers in the early 1920’s.

== Robinson & Steinman ==
In May 1920, Holton D. Robinson (b. 1863, Massena, NY, d. 1945, engineer of the Williamsburg Bridge) contacted Steinman and requested that they join forces to create a design for the Florianópolis Bridge (or Hercilio Luz Bridge, 1926) in Florianópolis, Brazil. After getting advice from Charles Fowler, Steinman agreed and they formed the firm of Robinson & Steinman in 1921, a partnership that lasted until the 1940s. They did not win the contract immediately but continued to collaborate on it and other projects. The early 1920s were considered a tough time for bridge construction, so Steinman tried to design his bridges to be economically pleasing rather than artistic, without sacrificing the structural integrity of the bridge. For example, Robinson and Steinman changed the original plans for the Florianopolis bridge, using eyebar chains as the upper chord of the stiffening truss instead of the conventional wire-cable. The new design produced a very stiff bridge with much less material than the original plan. Other bridge engineers would also have to take this new economical design into account when competing with Steinman. Steinman was well regarded in the profession and had a reputation for good presentations and for being politically astute.

When the question came up of who would consult on what bridge it usually came down to who had a better reputation or the most correct politics at the time. Steinman was a top politician of his profession and was much more naïve with local New York politicians than his counterparts. This partnership helped Steinman survive for a little while but it was only the start of the Great Depression. Steinman was offered a job as an assistant engineer on the Rondout Bridge for $200 a month, and accepted it. But the bridge was not being paid for and he lost his job after two months. Steinman then contacted some chief engineers that he had known from the past and got a job as an assistant engineer with New York Central Railroad. At this job he checked bridge designs and strengthened old ones but, the United States fell into the post-war Depression of 1921. All new employees at New York Central were laid off including Steinman. For the next four months Steinman walked the streets of New York looking for a job. He pounded on the door of every engineer that he knew and no one had work for him. Then on a suggestion from one of his acquaintances, Charles Fowler, he started his own private practice. After a few months of no work, business slowly picked up and in a matter of time he was working on bridges again.

The 1920s and 1930s were a relatively busy period for Steinman. His firm was involved in many significant projects including the Hercilio Luz Bridge (or Florianópolis Bridge, 1926), the Carquinez Strait Bridge (1927, at the time the second largest cantilever bridge in the US), the Mount Hope Bridge and Grand Mère Suspension Bridge (both 1929), the St. Johns Bridge and Waldo-Hancock Bridge (both 1931), the Sky Ride (1933 passenger transporter bridge at the Chicago Century of Progress exposition), the Henry Hudson Bridge (1936, particularly gratifying as this bridge realised his PhD thesis proposal), the Wellesley and Hill Islands Bridge, Wellesley Island Suspension Bridge and Georgina Island Bridge (all 1938 and part of the Thousand Islands Bridge System), the Deer Isle Bridge and the Sullivan-Hutsonville Bridge (both 1939).

In addition to the many bridges that Steinman designed, he was consulted on several projects that his firm did not win. Perhaps the most famous of these bridges is "Galloping Gertie," the original Tacoma Narrows Bridge. Steinman consulted extensively with the boosters of the bridge during the 1920s, but his design was not selected. He wrote of his frustration with the design that was chosen, and predicted a failure. He presented his findings at the 1938 meeting of the structural division of the American Society of Civil Engineers. In the audience was the designer of the Tacoma Narrows Bridge, which was under construction at the time. The failure did occur and he wrote that it had a profound impact on his design principles; he became even more conservative. It is said that he designed the Mackinac Bridge to withstand winds of 365 mph. It is considered by many to be his most significant work, although, perhaps not by Steinman himself, who expressed a personal preference for the St. Johns bridge, saying, "If you asked me which of the bridges I love best, I believe I would say the St. Johns bridge. I put more of myself into that bridge than any other bridge."

During this period Steinman became president of the American Association of Engineers and campaigned for more stringent educational and ethical standards within the profession. He also founded the National Society of Professional Engineers in 1934, serving as its first president. By the mid-1930s Steinman had a professional reputation as one of the pre-eminent bridge engineers of the US, especially for long span suspension bridges, but his bridges were eclipsed in the public eye by his old rival Ammann's George Washington Bridge (1931) and by Joseph Strauss's Golden Gate Bridge (1937) among others. His plans for a NYC cross harbor bridge (the "Liberty Bridge") came to naught with the 1940 collapse of Tacoma Narrows which cast all long suspension span proposals in doubt.

== Postwar work ==
Steinman and his firm were also in charge of the major rehabilitation of the Brooklyn Bridge commencing 1948. Structurae.de has an image of Steinman jauntily perched in mid air in the cables of the bridge, perhaps one of the best known images of him.

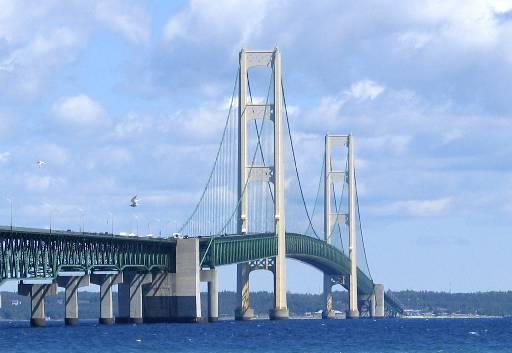
Steinman's crowning achievement, the "Mighty Mac" or Mackinac Bridge

But there were still long span suspension bridges to be built. Steinman was responsible for the Kingston-Rhinecliff Bridge (1957). More importantly, development and planning of the Mackinac Bridge had been contemplated for some time, and Steinman was appointed to the board of engineers based on Michigan State Legislature legislation of 1950, stating "the board of engineers retained by the Mackinac Bridge Authority was to be selected and nominated by the Dean of Engineering at the University of Michigan," and was soon the spokesman for the board. But his health was failing and he suffered heart attacks in 1952, the same year the legislature approved funding. He was nevertheless heavily involved in all aspects of the construction of the bridge from start to finish.

From the beginnings of his work on the Mackinac Bridge, Stewart Woodfill was impressed with Steinman's ethical procedure in addressing his requests. In 1950 new legislation was produced stating "the board of engineers retained by the Mackinac Bridge Authority was to be selected and nominated by the Dean of Engineering at the University of Michigan" (Ratigan 280). This was to make sure that there was no political influence in this decision. Steinman was selected to be a member of the board. Steinman who had been trained since he was young to work well in groups was chosen as the spokesman for the board. When it comes to speaking in front of large audiences Steinman does it naturally. It was said that Steinman spoke "as comfortable before large audiences as he was on tall bridges" (Petroski 332). The stresses of the early stages of the bridge soon took their toll on Steinman. He had heart attacks in 1952, which was the same year that legislation approved the financing and construction of the bridge.

Although he proposed the project of the Strait of Messina Bridge, a grandiose 1524 meter center span crossing of the Sicilian Straits of Messina, the "Mighty Mac," completed in 1957, and at the time the longest suspended span between anchors, was his last major achievement. In 1960, he was elevated as the 16th National Honor Member of Chi Epsilon national civil engineering honor society. He died on August 21, 1960 at his home in Manhattan.

At the time of his death, he was president of the Society for the History of Technology.

--Tribute—In closing, Dr. Dunn said this about the need for a broader education for engineers, "If the engineer's training neglects the great human mirrors of history and languages, if his heart and mind are insensible to the great social forces, if he but feebly develops the subtle qualities of character that make for personality, his career is limited, no matter how much science he knows" (Ratigan 315).

The Steinman engineering firm is now part of the Parsons Corporation as of 1988.

== Personal life and hobbies ==
He married Irene Hoffmann on June 9, 1915. The couple had one daughter and two sons. At the age of 63, Steinman took interest in poetry. Many people wrote to him saying his bridges represented poems. This inspired him to start writing. His love for bridge building was reflected in his writing, which can be seen in the titles of two of his poems, "The Bridge" and "I Built a Bridge". He received much recognition for his poetry; many poems were published in various newspapers and magazines as well as in the book "I Built a Bridge and Other Poems," published in 1955. Steinman became involved in leadership roles in many poetry groups including the president of the Wisconsin Poetry Foundation and director of the Poetry Institute in New York.

"A bridge is a poem stretched across a river, a symphony of stone and steel"

— a line from his poem Brooklyn Bridge - Nightfall

== List of Bridges Designed and Consulted on by Steinman ==
Steinman designed over 400 bridges on every inhabited continent. Below is a selection of some of the most significant bridges he worked on throughout his career.

	Name	Longest Span	Total Length	Type	Opened	Location	Steinman's Role	Remarks
Hell Gate Bridge	Hell Gate Bridge	978 feet (298 m)	17,000 ft (5.2km)	Arch	1917	New York City, New York	Assistant to Mr. Lindenthal	Upon opening was the longest Arch bridge in the world
	Carquinez Bridge	3,300 ft (1,000 m)	3,300 ft (1,000 m)	Cantilever	1927	Crockett and Vallejo, California	Designer [This bridge was replaced in 2003 and demolished in 2006]	
Hercilio Luz Bridge	Hercílio Luz Bridge	1,115 ft (340m)	2,689 ft (819.5 m)	Suspension Truss	1926	Florianópolis, Brazil	Designer	Longest Suspension span in Brazil
Walter Taylor Bridge	Walter Taylor Bridge	600 ft (182.9 m)	983 ft (299.7 m)	Suspension	1936	Brisbane, Australia	Based off Steinman's Design proposal for the Sydney Harbor Bridge	Longest suspension span in Australia
Thousand Islands Bridge	Thousand Islands Bridge	800 ft (240 m)	8.5 mi (13.7 km)	Multi-span: Suspension, Open-Sprandel deck arch, truss	1938	Wesley Island, New York and Hill Island, Ontario, Canada	Designer	
Deer Island Bridge	Deer Isle Bridge	1088 ft (322 m)	2,308 ft (703 m)	Plate Girder Suspension	1939	Deer Isle, Maine	Designer	
Mackinac Bridge	Mackinac Bridge	3,800 ft (1,158 m)	26,372 ft (8,038 m)	Suspension	1957	St. Ignace and Mackinaw City, Michigan	Designer	3rd longest main span in United States
Ayub Bridge	Ayub Bridge	806 ft (246 m)	1,020 ft (310m)	Arch	1962	Sukkur, Pakistan	Designer	Longest open main span in Pakistan
25 De Abril Bridge	25 de Abril Bridge	3,323 ft (1,012.9 m)	10,410 ft (3,173 m)	Suspension	1966	Lisbon, Portugal	Designer, with Raymond M. Brynton, Carl Gronquist	Longest suspended span and the longest main span in Continental Europe, world's longest continuous truss, world's deepest bridge foundation, fifth-longest suspension bridge in the world, the longest outside the US

== Books and articles by Steinman ==
Not an exhaustive list, as Steinman was a prolific author. Many of these books do not have ISBNs since they predate the ISBN system.

- Steinman, David B. A Practical Treatise on Suspension Bridges (2nd edition), John Wiley & Sons, New York (USA), 1929.
- Steinman, D. "Waldo-Hancock Bridge", in Engineering News Record, 17 March 1932.
- Steinman, D. (1945). The Builders of the Bridge: The Story of John Roebling and His Son New York: Harcourt Brace. ISBN 0-405-04724-X (second edition 1950)
- Steinman, D. "Le pont sur le détroit de Messine pour relier la Sicile à l'Italie", in Travaux, November 1954, n. 241.
- Steinman, David B. "Multiple-Span Suspension Bridge to Replace Rhine Arches at Düsseldorf", in Engineering News Record, 27 June 1946, n. 26.
- Steinman, D. (1957). Miracle Bridge At Mackinac. Grand Rapids: Wm. B. Eerdmans Publishing. ASIN B0007DXCV4
- Steinman, David B. I Built A Bridge, And Other Poems, The Davidson Press, New York, 1955.
