= Salome Sellers =

American centenarian (1800–1909)

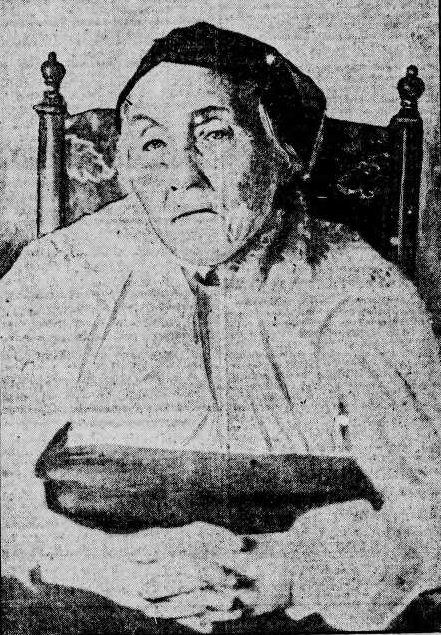
- Photograph of Salome Sylvester Sellers, taken at age 106 in 1906.
- Born: Salome Sylvester; October 19, 1800; Deer Isle, Maine, U.S.
- Died: January 9, 1909 (aged 108 years, 82 days); Salome Sellers House, Deer Isle, Maine, U.S.
- Known for: Last known person born in the 18th century
- Spouse(s): Joseph Sellers (married; 1830–1865)
- Children: 6
- Parent(s): Edward Sylvester and Deborah Cushman

Salome Sellers (née Sylvester; October 19, 1800 – January 9, 1909) was an American centenarian who was the last known, verified person born in the 18th century.

== Biography ==
Sellers was born as Salome Sylvester in Deer Isle, District of Maine (then a part of Massachusetts), the daughter of Captain Edward and Deborah (née Cushman) Sylvester. Descending from Mayflower Stock (she was a great-great-great-granddaughter of John Howland and great-great-great-great-granddaughter of Isaac Allerton) her father served during the American Revolution. She grew up on Deer Isle and married Joseph Sellers on December 23, 1830. The couple had six children together, Salome outliving all but her oldest son, William. She was widowed in 1865.

Due to her unusually long life, Sellers was often featured in local newspapers and visited by people interested in her long life. On her fame, she remarked, "I've lived too long. I'm only a curiosity now for people to come and stare at."

Sellers died in the same house she and her husband had built in 1830 in Deer Isle, Maine on January 9, 1909, aged 108 years, 82 days. Her house is now known as the Salome Sellers House and home to the Deer Isle-Stonington Historical Society. There has been a book published in 1998 by Peg Mitten Pr. and written by Caroline Smith Rittenhouse that details her life: "An Island Woman: Salome Sylvester Sellers, Deer Isle, Maine 1800–1909".

At the time of her death, she was the oldest woman in Maine and possibly the United States.

== See also ==
- Margaret Ann Neve (1792–1903), the oldest verified human born before the 19th century and the first female supercentenarian.
- Nabi Tajima (1900–2018), the last known surviving person born in the 19th century.
- Emma Morano (1899–2017), the last known surviving person born in the 1800s.
