= Isle au Haut, Maine =

Town in Maine, United States

- Town
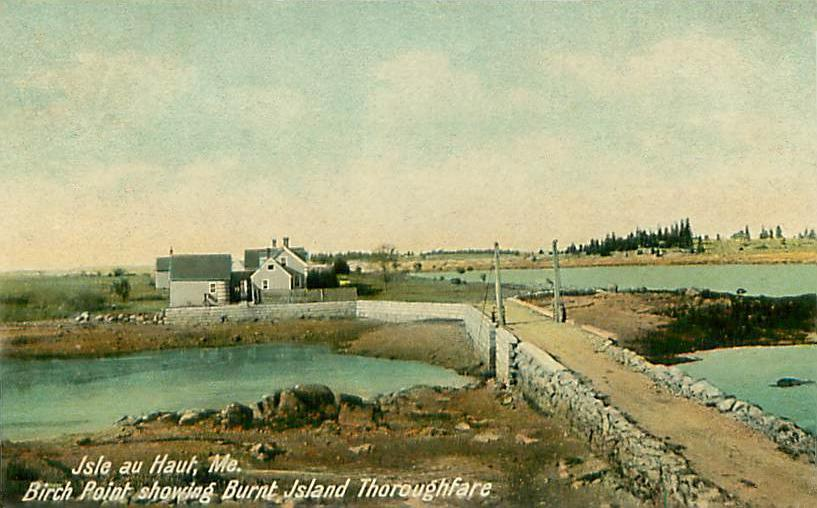
- Birch Point and Burnt Island Thoroughfare c. 1908

- Location in Knox County and the state of Maine
- Coordinates: 44°03′05″N 68°35′30″W
- Country: United States
- State: Maine
- County: Knox
- Incorporated: 1874
- Villages: Isle Au Haut; Lookout

Area
  - Total: 113.20 sq mi (293.19 km^{2})
  - Land: 12.52 sq mi (32.43 km^{2})
  - Water: 100.68 sq mi (260.76 km^{2})
- Elevation: 112 ft (34 m)

Population (2020)
  - Total: 92
  - Density: 8.3/sq mi (3.2/km^{2})
- Time zone: UTC-5 (Eastern (EST))
  - Summer (DST): UTC-4 (EDT)
- ZIP code: 04645
- Area code: 207
- FIPS code: 23-35135
- GNIS feature ID: 582530

Isle au Haut (/ˈaɪ.lə.hoʊ/) is a town in Knox County, Maine, United States, on an island of the same name in Penobscot Bay. The population was 92 at the 2020 census. Home to portions of Acadia National Park, Isle au Haut is accessible by ferry from Stonington.

== History ==
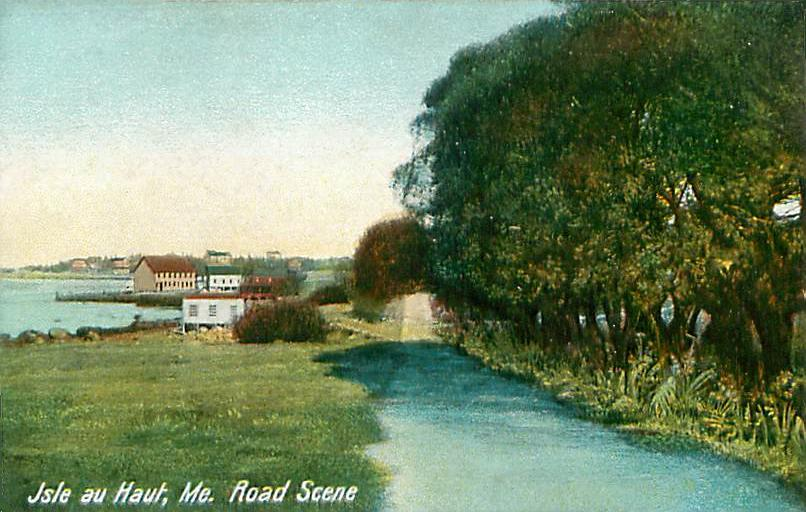
Road scene c. 1907

Native Americans left behind shell mounds on the island following their oyster feasts. It was territory of the Penobscot Abenaki Indians when, in 1604, French explorer Samuel de Champlain named it Isle au Haut, meaning High Island. English Capt. John Smith, charting the coast in 1614, noted that it was the highest island in Penobscot Bay. It was included in Deer Isle Plantation, incorporated by Massachusetts on February 2, 1789, as the town of Deer Isle.

In 1792, Henry Barter was granted land on the island, which by 1800 had a population of about 50 English and Scottish settlers. They subsisted by raising sheep, farming and fishing. In 1808, the island was the scene of a murder when smugglers shot and killed a federal customs officer. In the mid-19th century, the chief occupations were fishing and boatbuilding. On February 28, 1874, Isle au Haut was set off from Deer Isle and incorporated as a town.

By the late 19th century, when the island's population reached about 275, a village had developed beside the Isle au Haut Thoroughfare separating Kimball Island. The 1880s brought an influx of "rusticators," seasonal inhabitants, often from Boston and other big cities, who built vacation cottages at a private club at Point Lookout. In 1910, Isle au Haut had 178 year-round residents and 15 summer families. Some fishermen left when motors replaced sails to power boats, allowing them to operate more conveniently from the mainland. By 1935, the population had dropped to 75.

Today, lobster fishing remains the main industry, while the portions of Acadia National Park which cover about 60% of the island attract a few tourists. Vacation houses, although far fewer than those of the nearby summer colonies of North Haven, Vinalhaven and Mount Desert Island, more than double Isle au Haut's population during the summer. Linda Greenlaw wrote a book about it titled The Lobster Chronicles (2003).

Electricity came to the island in 1970, with telephone service in 1988.

== Geography ==
According to the United States Census Bureau, the town has a total area of 113.20 square miles (293.19 km^{2}), of which 12.52 square miles (32.43 km^{2}) is land and 100.68 square miles (260.76 km^{2}) is water. Isle au Haut is an island approximately 6 miles (9.7 km) long by 2 miles (3.2 km) wide in Penobscot Bay, part of the Gulf of Maine and Atlantic Ocean.

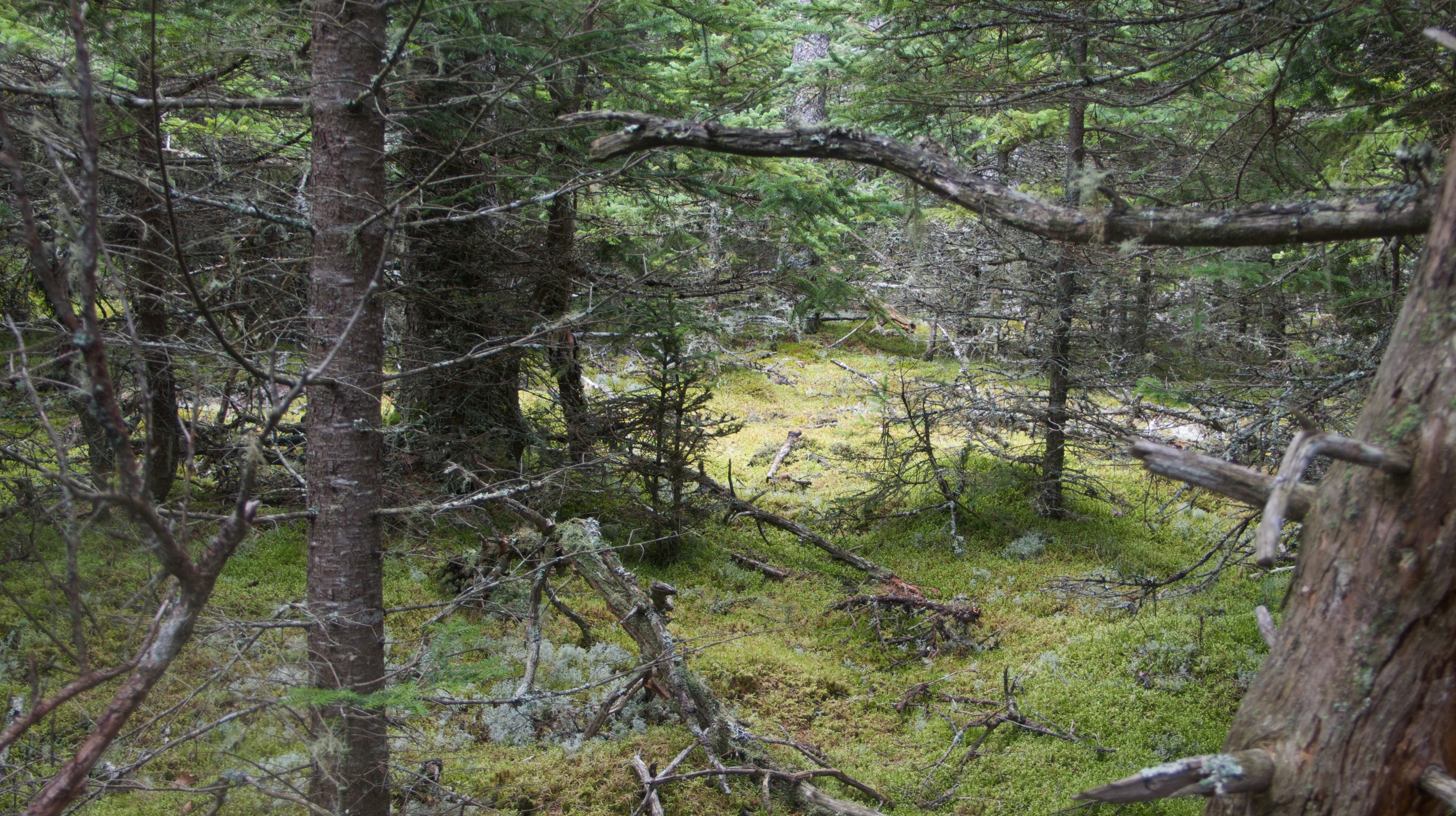
An island forest

Mount Champlain, elevation 540 feet (160 m), is the highest point on the island, located on a north-south ridge occupying the island's center. Rocky Mountain, elevation 511 feet (156 m), and Sawyer Mountain, at 486 feet (148 m), are neighboring summits along the ridge to the south. The terrain consists of low hills covered by temperate coniferous forests; the coastline is mainly granite boulders, with a few rocky beaches and salt marshes. Long Pond, a small freshwater lake, stretches down the eastern side of the island; being warmer and more sheltered than the surrounding ocean, it is used for recreation and one may occasionally see a float plane, although no scheduled service is available.

== Demographics ==
Historical population
Census	Pop.	Note	%±
1830	315		—
1880	274		—
1890	206		−24.8%
1900	182		−11.7%
1910	160		−12.1%
1920	102		−36.2%
1930	89		−12.7%
1940	97		9.0%
1950	82		−15.5%
1960	68		−17.1%
1970	45		−33.8%
1980	57		26.7%
1990	46		−19.3%
2000	79		71.7%
2010	73		−7.6%
2020	92		26.0%

=== 2010 census ===
As of the census of 2010, there were 73 people, 42 households, and 17 families living in the town. The population density was 5.8 inhabitants per square mile (2.2/km^{2}). There were 172 housing units at an average density of 13.7 per square mile (5.3/km^{2}). The racial makeup of the town was 91.8% White, 1.4% African American, 2.7% Native American, 1.4% Asian, and 2.7% from two or more races.

There were 42 households, of which 21.4% had children under the age of 18 living with them, 19.0% were married couples living together, 9.5% had a female householder with no husband present, 11.9% had a male householder with no wife present, and 59.5% were non-families. 45.2% of all households were made up of individuals, and 14.3% had someone living alone who was 65 years of age or older. The average household size was 1.74 and the average family size was 2.41.

The median age in the town was 49.5 years. 13.7% of residents were under the age of 18; 4.1% were between the ages of 18 and 24; 20.4% were from 25 to 44; 38.3% were from 45 to 64; and 23.3% were 65 years of age or older. The gender makeup of the town was 57.5% male and 42.5% female.

=== 2000 census ===
As of the census of 2000, there were 79 people, 32 households, and 20 families living in the town. The population density was 6.2 inhabitants per square mile (2.4/km^{2}). There were 164 housing units at an average density of 12.9 per square mile (5.0/km^{2}). The racial makeup of the town was 100.00% White. Hispanic or Latino of any race were 3.80% of the population. 19.7% were of French, 16.4% Irish, 11.5% Dutch, 11.5% English, 11.5% Scottish and 8.2% Finnish ancestry according to Census 2000.

There were 32 households, out of which 34.4% had children under the age of 18 living with them, 59.4% were married couples living together, 3.1% had a female householder with no husband present, and 34.4% were non-families. 25.0% of all households were made up of individuals, and 3.1% had someone living alone who was 65 years of age or older. The average household size was 2.47 and the average family size was 3.05.

In the town, the population was spread out, with 25.3% under the age of 18, 6.3% from 18 to 24, 30.4% from 25 to 44, 24.1% from 45 to 64, and 13.9% who were 65 years of age or older. The median age was 42 years. For every 100 females, there were 107.9 males. For every 100 females age 18 and over, there were 118.5 males.

The median income for a household in the town was $25,000, and the median income for a family was $34,167. Males had a median income of $23,750 versus $16,563 for females. The per capita income for the town was $11,723. 17.3% of the population lived below the poverty line, though no families, no one under eighteen or over 65 did.

== Sites of interest ==
- Isle au Haut Light

== Transportation ==
There is a ferry to and from Stonington.

== Notable people ==
- Abel Douglass, pioneer, sea captain
- Linda Greenlaw, author, fisherman, captain
