= Isle au Haut Light =

Lighthouse in Maine, US

Isle Au Haut Light
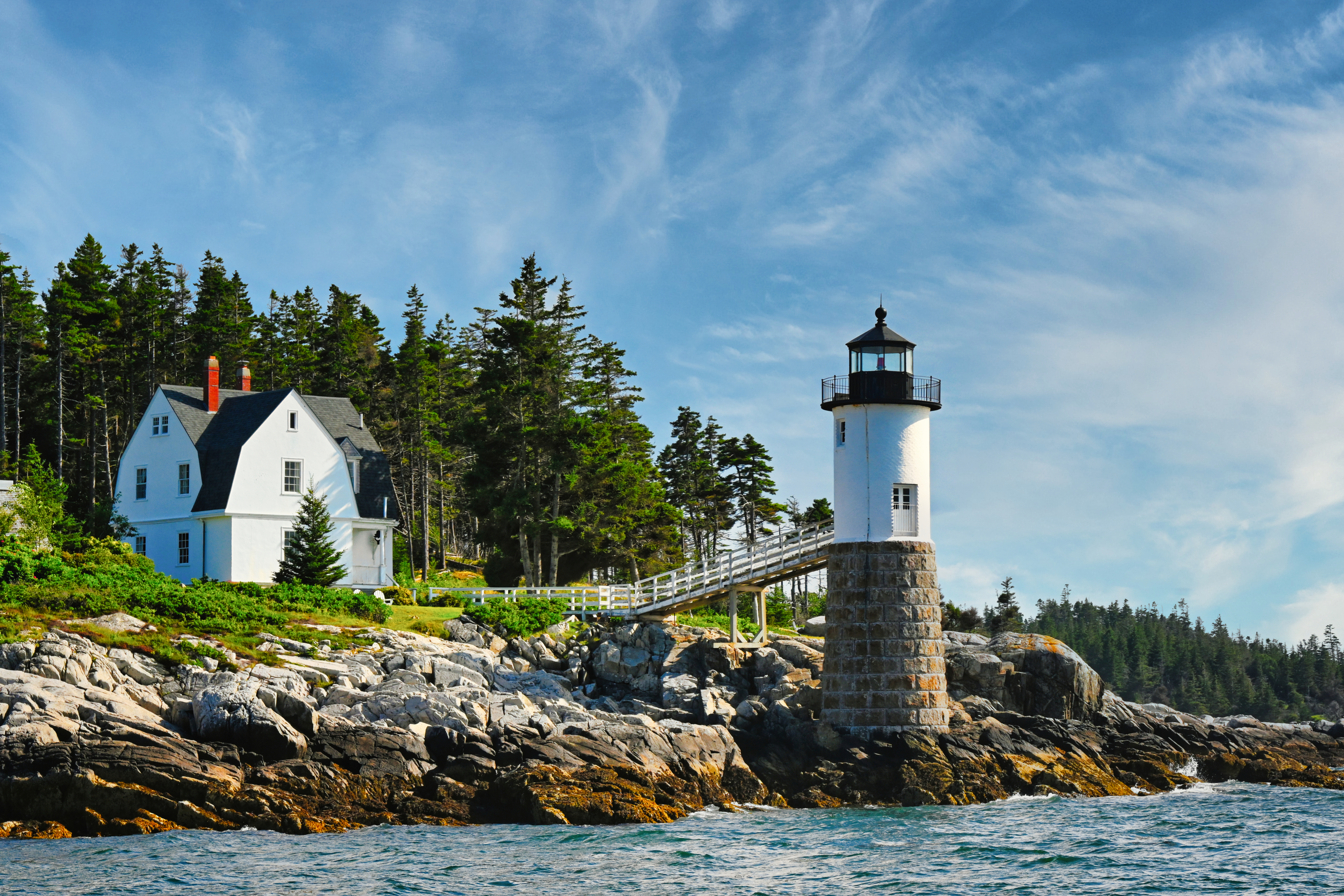
- The lighthouse in 2023
- Location: Isle au Haut, Maine
- Coordinates: 44°3′53.076″N 68°39′4.952″W

Tower
- Constructed: 1907
- Foundation: Granite blocks
- Construction: Granite and brick
- Automated: 1934
- Height: 12 m (39 ft)
- Shape: Conical (lower); Cylindrical (upper)
- Markings: Lower: gray Upper: white with black lantern
- Heritage: National Register of Historic Places listed place

Light
- Focal height: 48 feet (15 m)
- Lens: 4th order Fresnel lens (original), 9.8 inches (250 mm) solar powered (current)
- Range: White: 8 nautical miles (15 km; 9.2 mi); Red: 6 nautical miles (11 km; 6.9 mi)
- Characteristic: Fl R 4s with W sector
- Isle au Haut Light Station
- U.S. National Register of Historic Places
- U.S. Historic district
- Nearest city: Isle au Haut, Maine
- Architect: US Army Corps of Engineers
- MPS: Light Stations of Maine MPS
- NRHP reference No.: 87002265
- Added to NRHP: January 21, 1988

Isle au Haut Light, also called Robinson Point Light, is a lighthouse located at Robinson Point in Isle au Haut, Maine. The lighthouse was established in 1907.

== History ==
The lighthouse tower and surrounding buildings at Isle au Haut Light Station were built in 1907 by the United States Army Corps of Engineers at a 20-acre (8.1 ha) site at Robinson Point purchased from Charles E. Robinson. The lighthouse tower was built slightly offshore, standing 40 feet (12 m) tall and consisting of a white granite and brick cylindrical upper section on a conical granite block foundation. The keeper's quarters are a two-and-a-half-story frame and stucco Victorian house connected to the tower by a catwalk. A boathouse, oil house, and storage shed were also built at the station.

The lighthouse was automated in 1934 and the government sold the property except the tower back to Robinson. The Robinson family used the property as a summer home until they sold it to Jeff and Judi Burke in 1986. The Burkes converted the keeper's quarters into a bed and breakfast called "The Keeper's House," which they operated until 2007.

Isle au Haut Light was added to the National Register of Historic Places as "Isle au Haut Light Station" in 1988. The Coast Guard transferred the lighthouse to the Town of Isle au Haut in 1998 under the Maine Lights Program and the tower was completely restored in 1999.

The lighthouse remains in service as of 2008. The current optic for the light is a 9.8 inches (250 mm) solar-powered lens which flashes red every four seconds with a white sector covering the safe channel. The original fourth order Fresnel lens is at the Maine Lighthouse Museum in Rockland, Maine.

== See also ==
- National Register of Historic Places listings in Knox County, Maine
