= Margaret Ann Neve =

Guernsey supercentenarian (1792–1903)

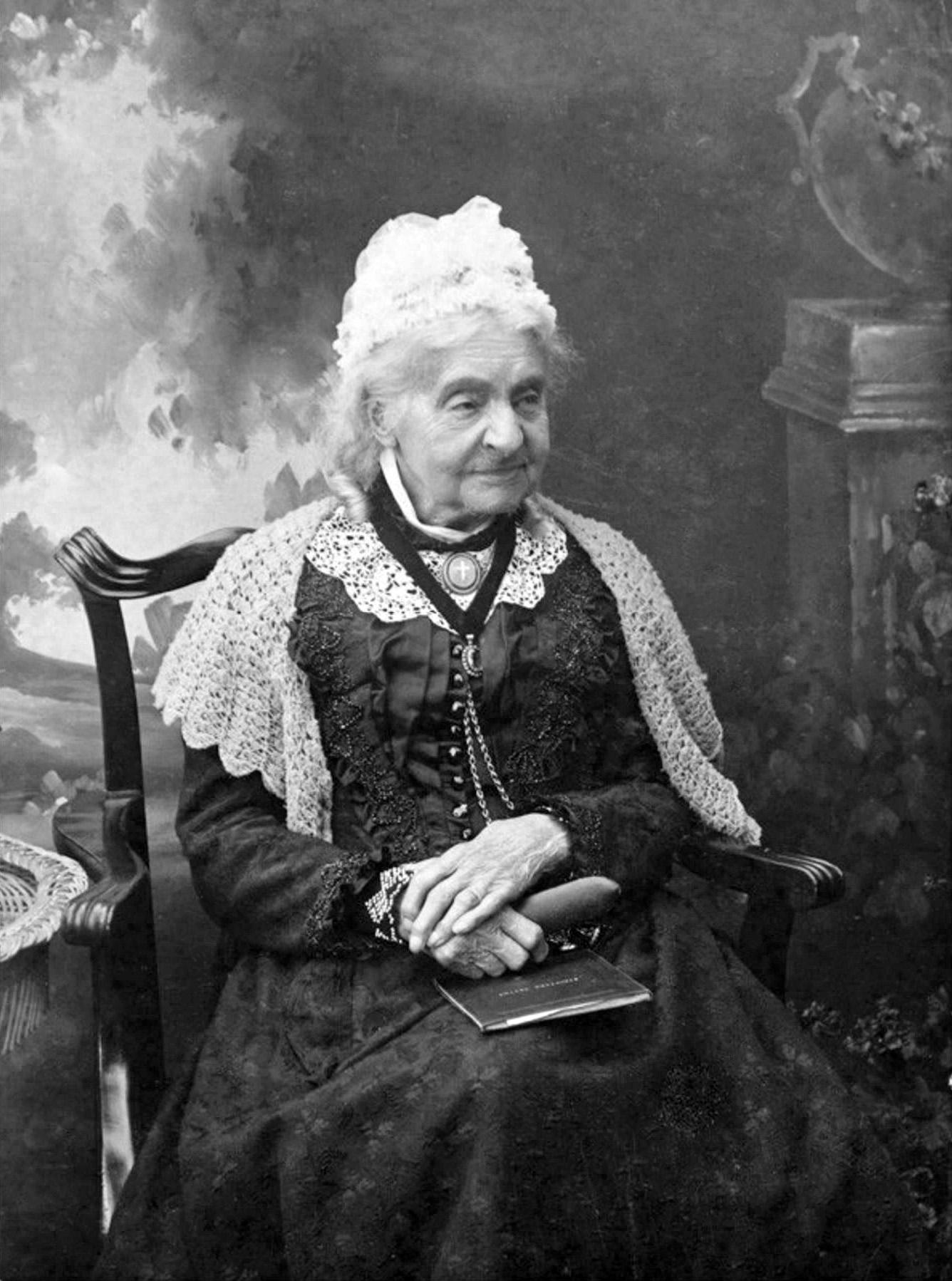
- Neve in July 1902
- Born: Marguerite Anne Harvey; 18 May 1792; Saint Peter Port, Guernsey
- Died: 4 April 1903 (aged 110 years, 321 days); Guernsey
- Known for: The first female supercentenarian; One of the first verified people who lived within three centuries (18th until the 20th century); One of the first verified people who lived for the entirety of a century; The oldest verified human born before the 19th century
- Spouse: John Neve (m. 1823; died 1849)

Margaret Ann Neve (née Marguerite Anne Harvey; 18 May 1792 – 4 April 1903) was a Guernseywoman who was the second validated supercentenarian after Geert Adriaans Boomgaard. She is widely regarded as the last living person born in the 1700s but that title actually belongs to Mary Wilkins (1799-1908). She lived in Saint Peter Port on the island of Guernsey in the English Channel.

== Family history ==
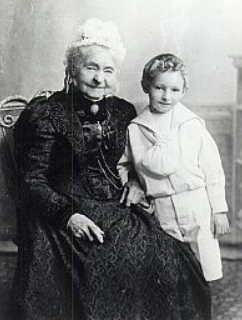
Neve pictured with her nephew in 1898

Her family was well-established on the island. Her father, John Harvey, was born in Guernsey in 1771 to John (1736–1778) and Margaret Ann (née Parker; 1736–1790) Harvey. Her father was involved in merchant shipping and privateering, earning a great amount of wealth over the years, and married Elizabeth Guille when they were both 19. John died on 4 December 1820, aged 49, while Elizabeth lived with her remaining children in a house called "La Chaumière" ("The Thatched Cottage"), which he had bought in 1808. Elizabeth died in 1871 aged 99. They had eight children:

- Marguerite (1792–1903)
- John (1793–1865), married Anne Sophia Grut (1802–1844) in 1826 and moved to Jersey, then England. They had a son named Thomas, who served in the militia and became a merchant.
- Elizabeth (1796–1884)
- Augusta (1797–1801), died as a toddler
- Maria (1799), died as an infant
- Augusta Maria (1801–1887), married Francis Payn
- Thomas (1803–1875), married Jane Elizabeth Payn and emigrated to Racine, Wisconsin, United States
- Louisa Mary (1806–1821)

Marguerite Anne Harvey was born on 18 May 1792, the eldest of eight children. Most of her childhood was spent in Guernsey. She later anglicized her name to Margaret Ann. Early in her life, she survived a fall down the stairs, which left her concussed for three days. She could remember the turmoil that the French Revolution brought to Guernsey; at the time, her father was in command of the militia on the island. In 1807, aged 15, Neve set sail for Weymouth with her father, but a storm caused the ship to land at Chesil Beach.

Neve was educated in Bristol, England, gaining an interest in literature and poetry. In 1815, she went to a "finishing school" in Brussels, becoming fluent in French and Italian and able to converse in German and Spanish. She would read the New Testament in Greek. With her headmistress, Neve visited the battlefield of Waterloo, shortly after the battle, once the corpses had been buried. There, Margaret picked up souvenirs which she showed to Prussian Field Marshal Blücher in London. Neve met with Charles François Dumouriez, a general of the French Revolutionary Wars, who dubbed her "la spirituelle" ("the spirited one").

== Personal life ==
Margaret married John Neve, born 1779, from Tenterden, Kent, in St Peter Port (Town) church on 18 January 1823. On their honeymoon, they visited the Waterloo battlefield, 8 years after the battle. She lived in England for 25 years of marriage, but when her husband died in 1849, she returned to Guernsey. They had no children.

The census for 1871 shows Margaret A. Neve (78) and her sister Elizabeth Harvey (73) living at 'Chaumière', Rouge Huis, St Peter Port, Guernsey. Neve travelled abroad to various countries with Elizabeth. Their last trip was in 1872 when Neve was 80, wherein they visited the Polish city of Kraków (then part of Austria-Hungary).

== Centenary and death ==
On 18 May 1899, a reception was held at Rouge Huis to celebrate her 107th birthday and her entrance into her 108th year. The town council, jurats, the officers of the staff, and about 250 of the leading residents attended. Despite her age, Margaret was found making marmalade the next morning by a reporter from The Times. She was reported as never being ill until the age of 105 when she had the flu, followed by bronchitis at 108. Aged 110, she climbed a tree to pluck an apple, explaining that they were much tastier when eaten straight from the tree.

A newspaper report records that she enjoyed a glass and a half of old sherry at lunchtime, followed by a weak whiskey and water at supper. She was in the habit of always rising early and abstaining from eating and drinking between meal times. Contrary to popular belief, she did not receive congratulations from Queen Victoria (who had died in 1901) upon reaching her 110th birthday (celebrated in 1902). However, the Harvey family (through Neve's niece Louisa) did exchange correspondence with the Royal Household, expressing gratitude for the signed photograph given to them on 4 May 1896 by the Queen.

Margaret Ann Neve died on 4 April 1903, at age 110 years, 10 months. She reportedly repeated a Psalm in a loud voice the day before she died. Flags in Guernsey were lowered to half-mast as a show of respect. Neve's great-niece was the mother of Glencairn Balfour Paul, who served as British Ambassador to Iraq (1969–71), Jordan (1972–75), and Tunisia (1975–77). In his 2006 memoir, Bagpipes in Babylon, Balfour Paul related how his mother "knew her well enough to send congratulations on her 110th birthday and to receive from her in reply a neatly written letter and photograph."

== See also ==
- List of British supercentenarians
- List of the verified oldest people
- Jean Thurel (1699–1807), lived from the 17th to 19th century
- Salome Sellers (1800–1909), the last surviving person from the 18th century
- Nabi Tajima (1900–2018), the last known surviving person born in the 19th century
- Colm de Bhailís (1796–1906), Irish poet who also lived from the 18th to 20th centuries
- Gallery of supercentenarians born before 1850 Gerontology Research Group (GRG), published 5 January 2018
