= Anica Mrose Rissi =

American author

Anica Mrose Rissi is an American author of children's books and young adult novels. Her first book, Anna, Banana, and the Friendship Split, was published by Simon & Schuster in 2015. Her nonfiction pieces have been published by the New York Times and The Writer magazine.

== Personal life ==
Anica Mrose Rissi was born in Maine and grew up on the island of Deer Isle (which also serves as the setting for her middle grade novel Wishing Season), where she graduated from the local public school system. After graduating from Yale University in 2001 with a degree in American Studies, Rissi moved to New York City, where she worked for many years as a book editor. Besides writing books, Rissi also plays fiddle in and writes lyrics for the band Owen Lake and the Tragic Loves. She currently lives near Princeton, New Jersey, and has a dog named Sweet Potato.

== Career ==
The Anna, Banana chapter-book series, for readers ages 6–10, follows a third-grader named Anna, her wiener dog named Banana, and Anna's two best friends, Sadie and Isabel. Kirkus called the first book in the series, Anna, Banana, and the Friendship Split (Simon & Schuster, 2015), "a realistic story for sensitive kids." The series is also published in Danish, Czech, and Hebrew. Rissi has stated in interviews that her own dog Arugula was the inspiration for the dog in the Anna, Banana books.

The Teacher's Pet (Disney-Hyperion, 2017), illustrated by Zachariah OHora, is a picture book about a teacher who is so in love with the new class pet, he can't see all the trouble it's causing. In a starred review, Publishers Weekly said, "Rissi's very funny text is a model of understatement and restraint...allowing OHora to make the most of the story's physical comedy in thickly painted scenes spiked with neon orange." School Library Journal called the book "perfect for classroom read-alouds and lessons on problem-solving or pets." The New York Times Book Review said, "Rissi (the 'Anna, Banana' books), with her edge-of-grossout humor, and OHora ('Horrible Bear!'), with his giant-headed, candy-colored people, have over-the-top sensibilities that mesh fantastically" and USA Today called it "A guaranteed chuckle for any grown-up who’s ever had to take care of the class 'pet' for the weekend." It is also published in Chinese.

Watch Out for Wolf! (Disney-Hyperion, 2019), illustrated by Charles Santoso, is a picture book about five little piggies who are preparing a surprise birthday party for their friend Wolf. The book was chosen for the Texas Library Association's 2020 2x2 Reading List. It is also published in Spanish and Catalan.

Love, Sophia on the Moon (Little, Brown Books for Young Readers, 2020), illustrated by Mika Song, is a picture book about a child who runs away to the moon after getting in trouble on earth. She writes letters to her mother, and her mother writes back. In a starred review, BookPage called the book a "tender, funny epistolary tale" and noted that "With clear affection, author Anica Mrose Rissi (best known for her Anna, Banana series) captures the determination and obstinacy of children and the steady, unwavering love of a parent." Kirkus Reviews said, "Readers will love it to the moon and back." The book is also published in Chinese and was awarded the 2021 Paterson Prize for Books for Young People in the Pre-K to Grade 3 category and the 2021 Maine Literary Award in Children's Literature category.

Hide and Don't Seek: And Other Very Scary Stories (HarperCollins, 2021) is a middle-grade short story collection that Kirkus Reviews called "ideal for any younger reader looking for bite-sized horror." Publishers Weekly said of the "20 brief offerings" in the collection, "some stories succeed better than others," but concluded "the sheer variety of creepy concepts, unsettling moments interspersed with humor, and gotcha twists will appeal to younger middle grade readers who are ready for a gateway into horror fiction—and a book to read around the campfire." In a starred review, School Library Journal said the collection has "all the makings of a modern-day classic" and "shows promise of being read and retold again and again by this generation’s thrill-seekers." The book includes "full-page charcoal-style illustrations" by Carolina Godina that "provide a sense of ominous eeriness." The collection is also published in Polish, Russian, Finnish, and Czech, and was named a 2022 Quick Pick for Reluctant Young Adult Readers by YALSA.

Wishing Season (HarperCollins, 2023) is a "beautifully written," "achingly sad but also hopeful story set on a small Maine island," in which "eleven-year-old Lily Neff struggles to accept the death of her twin brother, Anders." The middle grade novel "poses questions about the power of our connections—to other people, to animals, and to the world around and beyond" and "leads readers to questions about loss and the durability of relationships." The book received starred reviews from Publishers Weekly, Horn Book, School Library Journal, and Kirkus, which called it "a droll, well-paced, and deeply moving book about loss and friendship." Wishing Season appeared on several best-of-the-year lists, including Horn Book Fanfare Best Books of 2023, CCBC Choices 2024, and the 2024 Bank Street Best Children's Books of the Year (noted for Outstanding Merit). It was a finalist for the 2024 Maine Literary Award in the category of Young People's Literature and a winner of the 2024 Paterson Prize for Books for Young People. The book is also published in Turkish. In interviews, Rissi says Wishing Season is "a love letter to the place where I grew up, its people and its landscape—to the saltwater-spruce-granite air, the pets and wild animals I loved, and the community of storytellers that shaped me. And it’s about what it’s like to live in and love a place that’s an essential part of who you are, but where you don’t always fully belong—what it’s like to sometimes feel like an outsider in your own hometown."

Rissi's debut young adult novel, Always Forever Maybe (HarperCollins, 2018), is described as "about the depths and boundaries of true friendship and obsessive teenage love." Publishers Weekly said the book "meaningfully highlights known patterns of intimate-partner abuse and speaks to the joy and importance of enduring friendship". Always Forever Maybe was named to the Texas Library Association's TAYSHAS 2019 Reading List and is also published in Danish.

Rissi's second young adult novel, Nobody Knows But You (HarperCollins, 2020), "intersperses news reports, eyewitness testimony, personal letters and texts, and court transcripts to recount the eight summer weeks that led to a brutal murder at Camp Cavanick," according to Publishers Weekly. The book was named a Junior Library Guild Gold Standard Selection. Nobody Knows But You is also published in Dutch.

Girl Reflected in Knife (Penguin Random House, 2026), is "a psychologically harrowing YA novel that follows a vulnerable teen as she navigates a breakup and the grief-fueled disassociation that ensues." The "deceptively compact novel about learning to live, not just survive" includes "alternating clipped chapters and dreamy poetry." "Stitched together with fragments of a dark fairytale, the book boldly portrays how damaging addiction and mental health issues can be not only to those with them but also to their loved ones," according to Booklist, which said, "Rissi captures anguish with lush, harrowing language." The book received a starred review from Kirkus Reviews, which called it "An emotionally immediate yet ethereal and darkly fantastical tale woven through with threads that ring all too true" and a starred review from Shelf Awareness, which said, "This emotional YA novel is both tragic and mesmerizing" and noted that the book "deftly examines mental health through the lens of internalized trauma and skewed self-perception." Publishers Weekly called the book "propulsive," and School Library Journal predicted, "Fans of dark fairy tales, unreliable narrators, and psychology will be drawn in to Destiny’s twisted web of lies and half-truths." The Bulletin said, "Rissi's warped take on the happily-ever-after trope is intensely compulsive" and called it "a truly immersive read." In an interview with The Princeton Echo, Rissi mentioned that she worked on the manuscript for more than a decade, saying, "The book was a slow accumulation of questions, ideas, experiences and ambitions that could not have been rushed. I needed that time to try, fail and experiment. The story needed that time to become fully itself, and to help me become the writer who could pull it off."

== Bibliography ==
=== Picture books ===
- The Teacher's Pet, illustrated by Zachariah OHora (Disney-Hyperion, 2017)
- Watch Out for Wolf!, illustrated by Charles Santoso (Disney-Hyperion, 2019)
- Love, Sophia on the Moon, illustrated by Mika Song (Little, Brown Books for Young Readers, 2020)

=== Chapter books ===
- Anna, Banana, and the Friendship Split, illustrated by Meg Park (Simon & Schuster, 2015)
- Anna, Banana, and the Monkey in the Middle, illustrated by Meg Park (Simon & Schuster, 2015)
- Anna, Banana, and the Big-Mouth Bet, illustrated by Meg Park (Simon & Schuster, 2015)
- Anna, Banana, and the Puppy Parade, illustrated by Meg Park (Simon & Schuster, 2016)
- Anna, Banana, and the Little Lost Kitten, illustrated by Meg Park (Simon & Schuster, 2017)
- Anna, Banana, and the Recipe for Disaster, illustrated by Meg Park (Simon & Schuster, 2018)
- Anna, Banana, and the Sleepover Secret, illustrated by Cassey Kuo (Simon & Schuster, 2018)
- Anna, Banana, and the Magic Show Mix-Up, illustrated by Cassey Kuo (Simon & Schuster, 2019)

=== Middle grade books ===
- Hide and Don't Seek: And Other Very Scary Stories, illustrated by Carolina Godina (HarperCollins, 2021)
- Wishing Season (HarperCollins, 2023)

=== Young Adult novels ===
- Always Forever Maybe (HarperCollins, 2018)
- Nobody Knows But You (HarperCollins, 2020)
- Girl Reflected in Knife (Penguin Random House, 2026)
