= Benjamin River =

Location
- Country: United States

Physical characteristics
- Source
  - location: Maine
- Mouth
  - location: Eggemoggin Reach
  - coordinates: 44°17′02″N 68°37′44″W
  - elevation: sea level
- Length: about 3 miles (5 km)

The Benjamin River is a tidal river in Hancock County, Maine. From its source (44°19′01″N 68°36′11″W), the river runs about 3 miles southwest to Eggemoggin Reach. The river forms part of the border between Sedgwick and Brooklin.

== See also ==
- List of rivers of Maine
