= Penobscot Bay =

Bay in Maine, United States

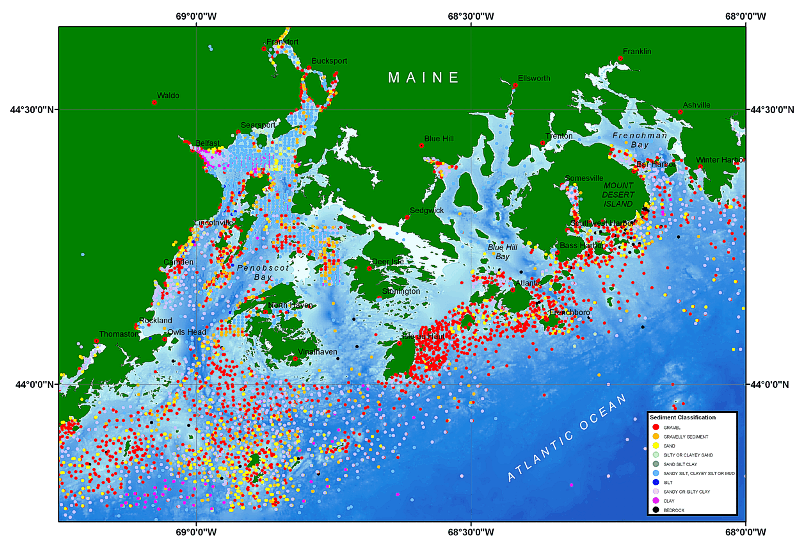
- Penobscot Bay (Maine)

- Location within Maine
- Location: Maine, United States
- Coordinates: 44°11′14″N 68°55′16″W
- River sources: Penobscot River
- Ocean/sea sources: Atlantic Ocean
- Max. depth: 145 m (476 ft)
- Salinity: approx. 31 psu
- Settlements: Rockland, Maine; Camden, Maine

Penobscot Bay (French: Baie de Penobscot) is an inlet of the Gulf of Maine and Atlantic Ocean in south central Maine, a stretch known as Midcoast Maine, in a broader Atlantic region known as Down East. The bay originates from the mouth of Maine's Penobscot River, downriver from Belfast. Penobscot Bay has many working waterfronts including Rockland, Rockport, Stonington, and Belfast. Penobscot Bay is between Muscongus Bay and Blue Hill Bay, just west of Acadia National Park.

At the beginning of the Holocene epoch 11,000 years ago, the Gulf of Maine's sea level fell as low as 180 feet (55 m) below its present height. Penobscot Bay was then a continuation of Penobscot River that meandered through a broad lowland extending past present day Matinicus Island.

Penobscot Bay and its chief tributary, the Penobscot River, are named for the Penobscot Indian Nation.

The bay was the site of a humiliating American defeat during the Revolutionary War. In 1779 a Continental Navy flotilla consisting of 19 warships and 25 support vessels was dispatched on July 24 to recapture the mid-coast of Maine from the British who had captured part of the territory and constructed fortifications near the bay, naming the newly captured territory New Ireland. The American besiegers became stalled in their assaults due to dissension between Solomon Lovell and Dudley Saltonstall, two of the expedition's commanders, and after a British flotilla led by George Collier arrived on August 13, the American fleet fled, beaching and burning their ships in the face of a superior British force of 10 warships. All 44 ships were either destroyed or captured, in what proved to be America's worst naval defeat until Pearl Harbor, 162 years later.

There are many islands in this bay and on them are some of the country's most well-known summer colonies.

== Conservation and environmental groups ==
Groups with chief focus on Penobscot Bay or parts thereof.

- Coastal Mountains Land Trust
- Friends of Harriet L. Hartley Conservation Area
- Friends of Sears Island
- Islesboro Islands Trust
- Maine Center for Coastal Fisheries
- Penobscot Bay Watch
- Penobscot Bay Waterkeeper

== Conservation issues ==
Historic Water Pollution Management. Penobscot Bay has been the receiving waters for sewage waste and industrial waste discharges from bay and river towns since the 19th century. Discharge treatment was primarily dilution until the mid 20th century when the federal government began requiring communities and businesses of all states to meet water pollution control standards.

Beginning with the Federal Water Pollution Control Act of 1948, where states were requested to evolve and enforce their own standards, federal water pollution regulation evolved in 1970 to require that any project requiring a federal permit must be certified to meet state standards, then expanded in 1972 to require projects to meet a host of federal standards. The law is now known as the Clean Water Act of 1972.

On June 28, 1966, the State of Maine's Commissioner of Sea and Shore Fisheries, Ronald W. Green, ordered closure of the shellfish beds in the waters of Searsport and Stockton Springs, in upper Penobscot Bay, "due to the polluted condition of the water."

The US Department of the Interior's Water Pollution Control Administration and the US Public Health Service then conducted a joint investigation of the lower Penobscot River and upper Penobscot Bay "to determine the sources of this pollution, the direction of travel of this pollution and the degree of economic injury involved."

In February 1967, the Water Pollution Control Administration (WPCA) published its findings as "Report on Pollution - Navigable Waters of the Penobscot River and Upper Penobscot Bay". The investigation found that the sewage from eleven towns and effluents of thirteen businesses and one university facility were the chief sources of the pollution.

According to the report,"substantial economic injury results from the inability to market shellfish or shellfish products in interstate commerce because of pollution caused by sewage and industrial wastes discharged to the Penobscot River and upper Penobscot Bay area and action of state authorities." The WPCA noted that "accordingly the pollution of these navigable waters is subject to abatement under procedures described in Section 10 of the Federal Water Pollution Control Act, as amended"

The WPCA report recommended specific water quality requirements for these pollution dischargers, and concluded if the identified pollution sources improved their waste treatment practices, the waters of the upper Penobscot Bay communities of Northport, Searsport, Stockton Springs, Penobscot, Castine, Islesboro and Belfast would again be available for commercial and recreational fishing, swimming, pleasure boating, industrial processing and cooling water, wildlife and navigation.

== Fisheries ==
Early Commercial Lobstering: 1840s to 1870s. Penobscot Bay was one of the first Maine lobster grounds exploited on a significant commercial scale. A United States Fish Commission report "The Lobster Fishery of Maine" in the 1899 Bulletin of the United States Fish Commission, Vol. 19, Pages 241-265 details some of these early ventures, as these excerpts reveal:

In 1847 Captain Oakes purchased the smack Josephine, with which he began running to Johnson & Young's establishment, at Boston, in 1848, buying a portion of his lobsters in the Penobscot Bay region, where this fishery had just been started. The quantity of lobsters carried by him that year was 40,000.... Lobsters were so abundant at the Muscle Ridges, at this period, that four men could fully supply Captain Oakes with lobsters every trip. In the course of ten days each man would obtain between 1,200 and 1,500 marketable lobsters. In Captain Oakes' opinion, the Muscle Ridges have furnished the most extensive lobster fishery of the Maine coast. He ran to this locality until 1874.

Capt. S. S. Davis, of South Saint George, states that about 1864, when he first began buying lobsters at the Muscle Ridges, three men, tending 40 to 50 pots each, caught all the count lobsters he could carry to market in his smack. He could load 5,000 lobsters at a time, and averaged a trip in 7 to 9 days. This traffic continued for six or seven years. In 1879, Captain Davis bought from 15 men In the same locality, and at times was obliged to buy also of others in order to make up a load.

The fishery at North Haven began in 1848, but did not increase so rapidly at first as in sections farther west, as the smacks would only take the medium-sized lobsters, fearing that the largest would not be able to stand the trip. At Matinicus Island the fishing began in 1868. In 1852 the people on Deer Island began the fishery, and as the smackmen made frequent visits the business rapidly increased. The establishment of a cannery at Oceanville, about 1860, also caused a considerable development of the fishery. The fishery was started at Isle Au Haute about 1855, and at Swan Island in the early fifties.

== Islands in Penobscot Bay ==
- Isle au Haut
- Islesboro
- North Haven
- Vinalhaven
- Matinicus Isle
- Criehaven
- Sears Island
- Great Spruce Head
- Nautilus Island
- Little Deer Isle
- Deer Isle (Deer Isle, Stonington, Mountainville, Sunrise, Sunset)
- Various minor islands in Knox, Waldo, and Hancock Counties; see List of islands of Maine

== Towns on the western side ==
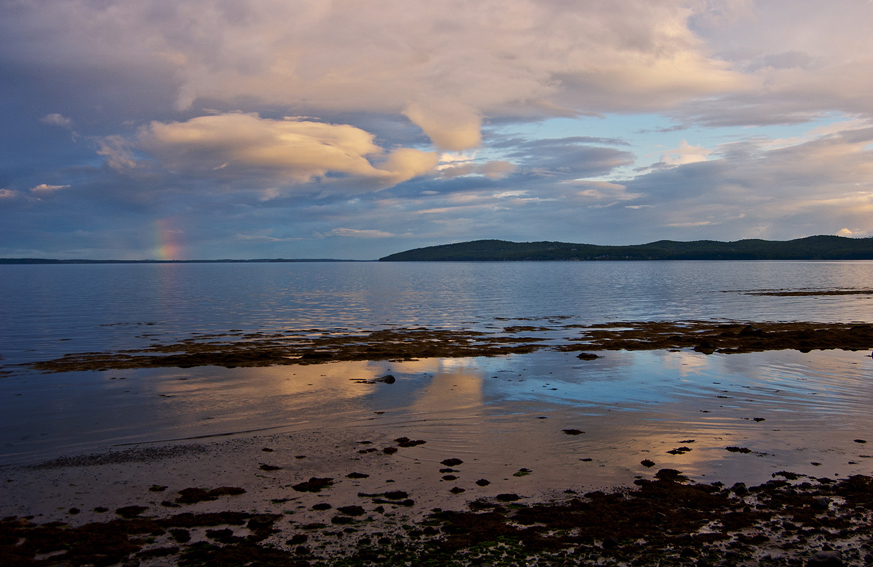
Penobscot Bay near Belfast

- Saint George
- South Thomaston
- Owls Head
- Rockland
- Rockport
- Camden
- Lincolnville
- Northport
- Belfast
- Searsport (Penobscot Marine Museum)
- Stockton Springs
- Prospect
- Verona Island

== Towns on the eastern side ==
- Bucksport
- Orland
- Penobscot
- Castine
- Brooksville
- Deer Isle
- Stonington

== Penobscot Bay panorama ==
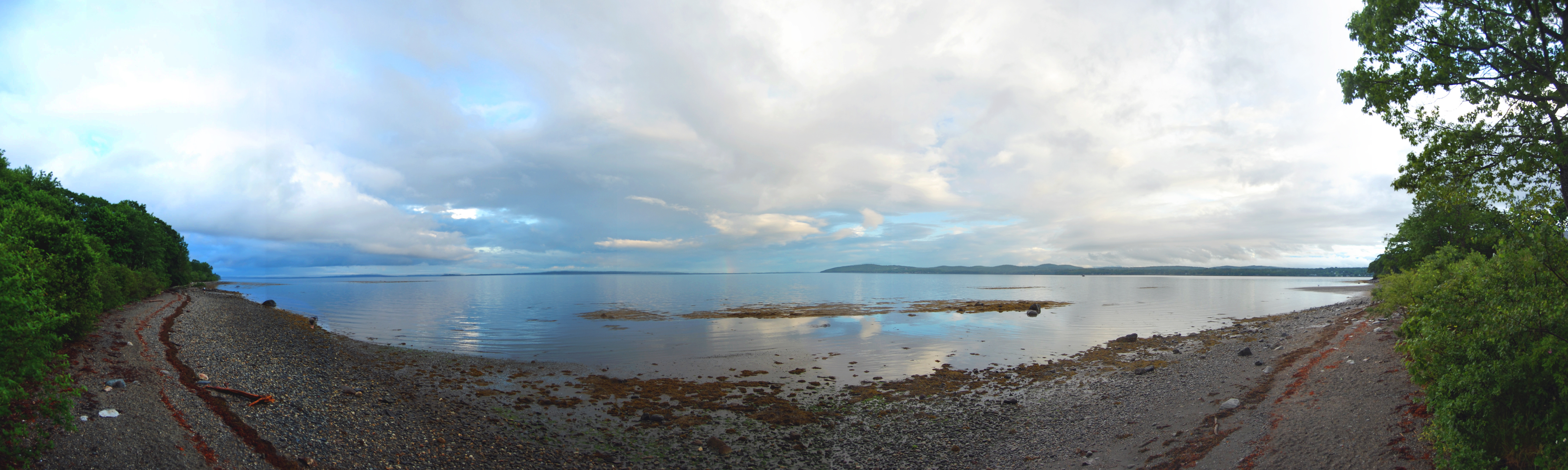
A 180° panorama of the Penobscot Bay from near the Belfast/Searsport town line looking SE. Belfast Bay is to the right, Northport on the peninsula, Islesboro on the center horizon, Castine to the left of that, and toward Stockton Springs and the entrance to the Penobscot River are beyond the trees on the far left.

== In arts and literature ==
- Time of Wonder, a children's picture book by Robert McCloskey, is set in and around Penobscot Bay.
- In the 1990 movie The Hunt for Red October, the Soviet submarine, ends up in Penobscot Bay.

== General and cited references ==
- Bicheno, Hugh (2003). Redcoats and Rebels: The American Revolutionary War. London: Harper Collins. ISBN 978-0-00-715625-2. OCLC 51963515.
