= Sunset, Maine =

- Village
- Location within Maine
- Coordinates: 44°12′21″N 68°42′17″W
- Country: United States
- State: Maine
- County: Hancock
- Town: Deer Isle
- Elevation: 98 ft (30 m)
- Time zone: UTC-5 (Eastern (EST))
  - Summer (DST): UTC-4 (EDT)
- ZIP code: 04683
- Area code: 207
- GNIS feature ID: 576548

Sunset is an unincorporated village in the town of Deer Isle, Hancock County, Maine, United States. The community is located along Maine State Route 15A, 27 miles (43 km) south-southeast of Ellsworth. Sunset has a post office, with ZIP code 04683.
