= Little Deer Isle, Maine =

Island off the coast of Maine, United States

Coordinates: 44°17′11″N 68°41′45″W

Little Deer Isle (Maine)

Little Deer Isle is an island in Penobscot Bay, lying just north of Deer Isle, Maine, United States. Although Little Deer Isle and Deer Isle are part of the same town, which is also named Deer Isle, they are separate islands. Little Deer Isle is served by Maine State Route 15 via the Deer Isle Bridge. The northern end of the island is called Eggemoggin, and there is a small island with a lighthouse on it at the tip called Pumpkin Island. Little Deer is approximately four miles (6.4 km) long and connects to Deer Isle by way of a causeway. There are about 250 year-round residents in the Little Deer zip code, but there may be more summer residents. There is abundant wildlife on the island including deer, fox, squirrels, wild turkeys, ospreys, and bald eagles.

== See also ==
- List of islands of Maine
