= Stonington Opera House =

- U.S. National Register of Historic Places
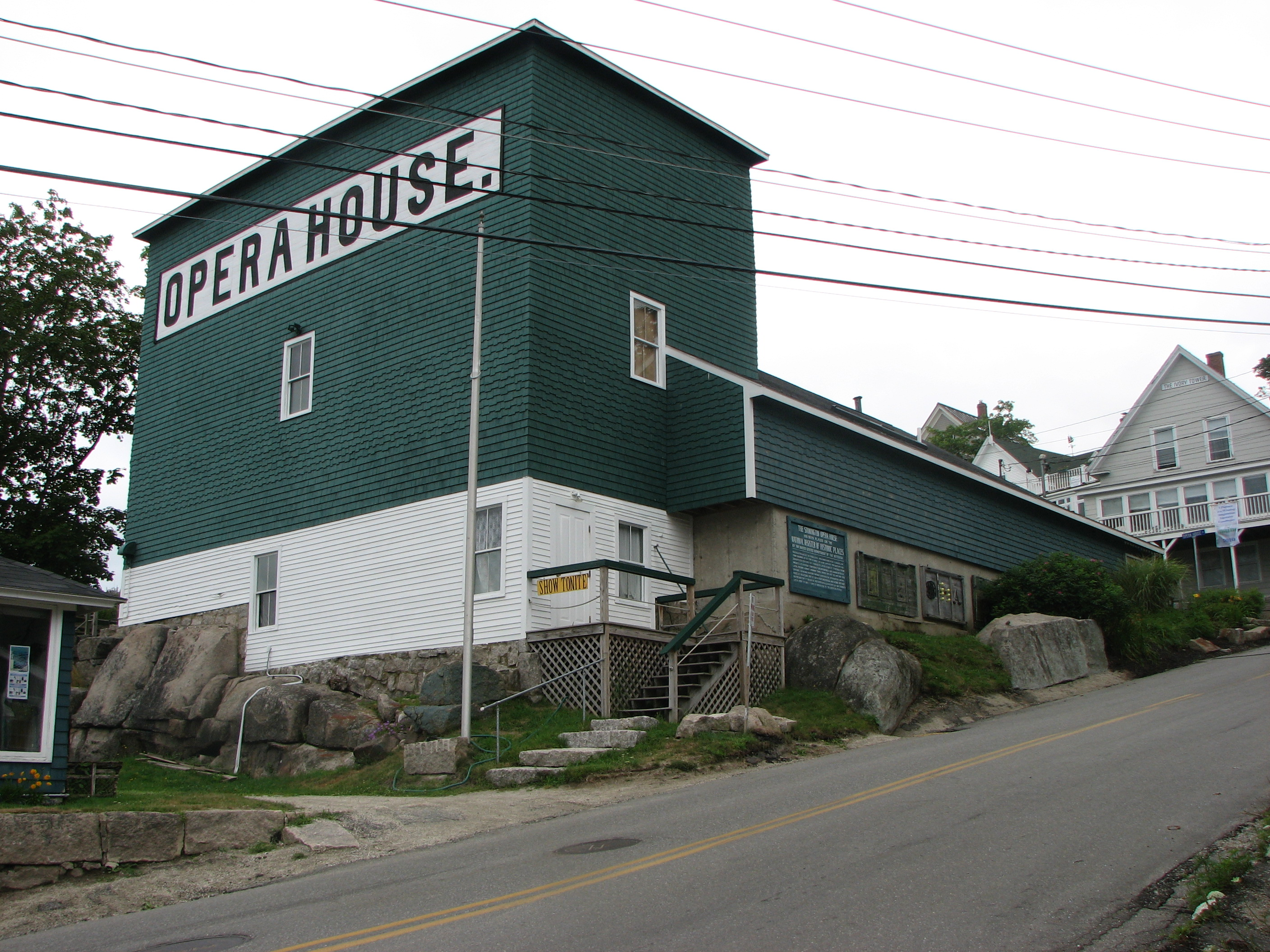

- Location within Maine Location within the United States
- Location: 1 School St, Stonington, Maine 04681
- Coordinates: 44°9′21″N 68°40′1″W
- Area: less than one acre
- Built: 1912
- Website: operahousearts.org
- NRHP reference No.: 91001509
- Added to NRHP: October 16, 1991

The Stonington Opera House is a theatrical venue at the corner of Main and School Streets in the center of Stonington, Maine. Built in 1912, it is one of a small number of early 20th-century performance halls constructed in Maine. It is the current home of Opera House Arts, a non-profit organization dedicated to restoring and preserving the historic building to its original purpose as a central community institution. The building was listed on the National Register of Historic Places in 1991.

== Description and history ==
The Stonington Opera House is set in the town's central business district, on a rock outcrop across Main Street from the main pier. The building has two sections, the more prominent one being the tall southern portion, on which a large sign proclaim's the building's name. This section is framed in wood, finished in clapboards, and is topped by a hip roof. It houses the stage area, including wings and dressing rooms. To the north is a lower gable-roofed ell, which houses the seating area and lobby. The main entrance is located at the north end of the building, while there is a secondary entrance on the east side of the tall south block. Distinctive interior features include a surviving 1910s projection booth, which is lined with asbestos tile and designed to be isolatable in the event that unstable nitrate-based film stock (used in early-generation films) caught fire.

The theater was built in 1912, on the site of an earlier hall which was destroyed by fire in 1910. It continued the practice of the earlier facility, hosting theatrical productions, lectures, and community events. Its floor was covered with removable folding chairs, so that the space could be used for dances and other social events. Its diverse uses included town meetings, basketball games, and roller skating. It was fitted for screening films around 1918, which came to dominate its uses in the mid-20th century. Unlike other early theaters, which were generally incorporated into municipal buildings, this one was specifically built as a profit-making venture, and was designed to accommodate elaborate theatrical productions, and is probably the oldest of this type in the state.

After a period of decline, the building was rehabilitated in 1979, but closed again in the late 1980s. It was again updated and reopened by Opera House Arts, a local nonprofit, in 2000, and is once again used primarily for film screenings and theatrical productions.

== See also ==
- National Register of Historic Places listings in Hancock County, Maine
