= Deer Isle Bridge =

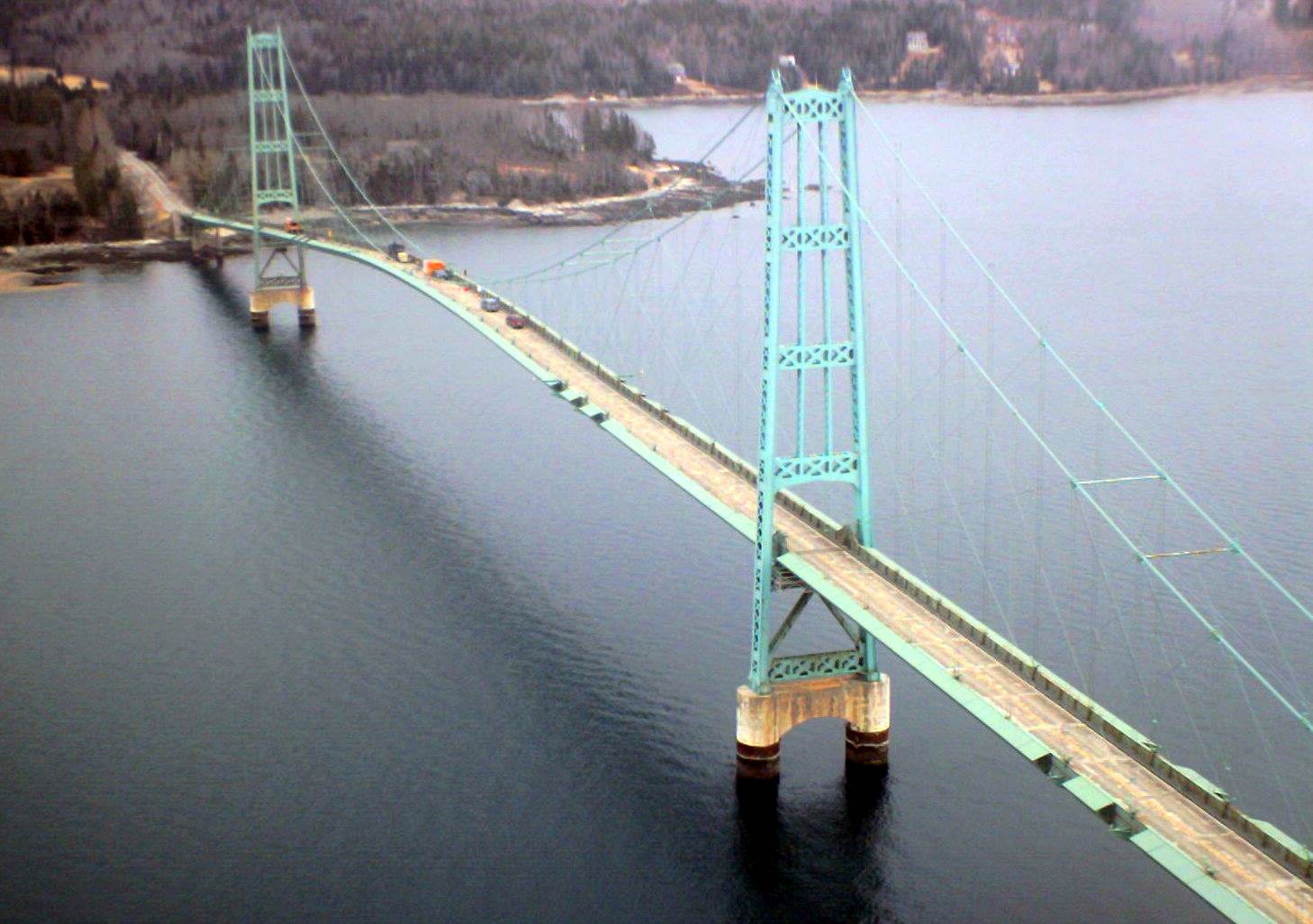
- Coordinates: 44.2940°N 68.6888°W
- Carries: Motor vehicles, pedestrians, bicycles
- Crosses: Eggemoggin Reach
- Locale: Deer Isle, Maine

Characteristics
- Design: Suspension
- Longest span: 1,088 feet (332 m)
- Clearance below: 85 feet (26 m)

History
- Opened: June 19, 1939

Statistics
- Daily traffic: 3,950 (2011)

Location
- Interactive map of Deer Isle Bridge

The Deer Isle Bridge is a suspension bridge spanning Eggemoggin Reach in the state of Maine. The bridge is the only vehicular connection from the Maine mainland to Little Deer Isle, one of the segments that make up the island. The span was completed in March 1939 with a main span of 1,088 feet (332 m). The bridge was designed by Holton Duncan Robinson and David Bernard Steinman. It encountered wind stability problems that were similar to those of the Whitestone Bridge and the original Tacoma Narrows Bridge, which collapsed shortly after it opened. The problems led to modifications which included numerous cable stays connecting cables to the tower and tower to the deck. The span today carries two narrow lanes of State Route 15.

A re-decking project was completed in May 2008. Repainting started in mid-2010 has been completed.

== History ==
The Deer Isle-Sedgwick Bridge, named for the two townships it connects, was the first bridge built between Deer Isle and the mainland, replacing an inadequate ferry crossing system and effectively opening the island to tourism opportunities. It is notable for the innovation of its designers and contractors in creating a durable, long-span, high-level structure across a navigable arm of the Atlantic at minimal cost. Unprecedented use of prefabricated and previously used materials simplified construction and minimized costs, and much of the outdoor work was completed under poor weather conditions.

The challenges facing David B. Steinman, his firm, and their contractors were numerous. The popularity of Eggemoggin Reach as a yachting area called for a 200-foot-wide (61 m) channel at midspan with a minimum 85-foot (26 m) under clearance, placing the roadway at 98.7 feet (30.1 m) above mean water level. At the same time, the depth required for foundations at this location called for minimizing the length of the approach spans. This height problem was solved by employing steep 6.5-percent approach grades and a fairly short 400-foot (120 m) vertical curve at the center of the main span. In this manner, the needed height was attained and the approach viaducts were kept to a minimum length.

The project was also complicated by its required early-summer completion date, meaning that much of the work had to be done during the winter and early spring months when weather conditions posed a significant challenge. Robinson and Steinman and their contractors solved this difficulty by prefabricating many of the components offsite and completing the bulk of the assembly quickly, working between high tides. Site-specific innovations in prefabrication and construction methods minimized outdoor work at the site and departed from conventional bridge-building practice. This careful consideration and planning resulted in a project completed on schedule and at low cost, despite the extreme conditions.

The substructure, in particular, employed prefabrication at an unprecedented level. Instead of assembling the steel sheet-pile cofferdams and the metal forms for the main tower pedestals on site, Merritt-Chapman & Scott had them prefabricated at their yard on Staten Island and brought to Maine by barge. Their use of secondhand steel materials for the dams, along with the prefabrication and careful timing of the construction schedule, saved a great deal of money. The prefabricated dams were assembled for use on barges near the work site. After mud was removed from the bottom and the rock foundation carefully sounded, the dam bases were torch-cut to fit the profile of the irregular bedrock on which they were to be set. Finally, the dams were filled with concrete.

On the superstructure, pre-stressed twisted-strand cables invented by the designer were used to advantage on both the main strands and the suspenders, meaning the time-consuming and expensive field adjustments were unnecessary. These cables debuted in the U.S. in 1931 on Steinman and Robinson's Waldo-Hancock Bridge near Bucksport, Maine, and their St. Johns Bridge in Portland, Oregon. A new connection method, which used sleeve nuts to connect each main strand socket to its anchorage rod, was also used. These connections, invented by Robinson and first used on the Thousand Islands Bridge the previous year, made small adjustments to the main strands very easy.

Before the bridge was finished, unexpected wind-induced motion in the relatively lightweight deck indicated the need for greater stability. Diagonal stays running from the main cables to the stiffening girders on both towers were added to stabilize the bridge. However, the bridge's motion during unusually severe storms in the winter of 1942–1943 caused extensive damage and destroyed some of the stays. Because of the recent collapse of the Tacoma Narrows Bridge, stronger and more extensive longitudinal and transverse diagonal stays were added.

== See also ==
- List of bridges documented by the Historic American Engineering Record in Maine
