= Stonington, Maine =

Town in Maine, United States

- Town
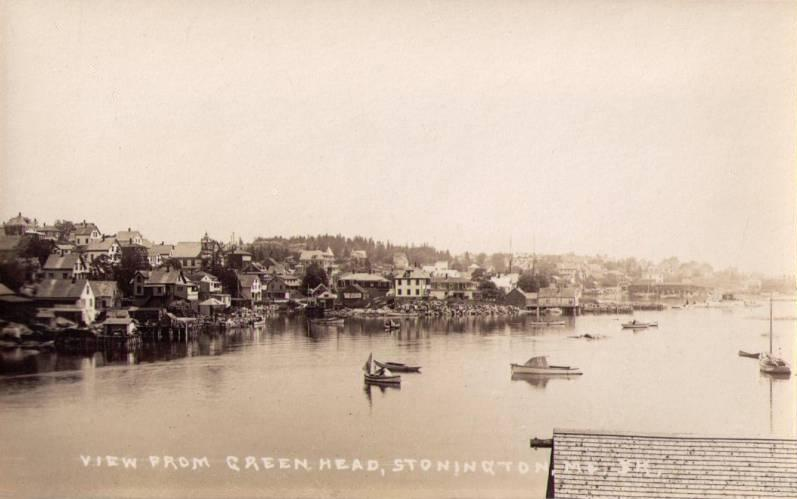
- View of the waterfront c. 1915

- Logo

- Location within Maine Location within the United States
- Coordinates: 44°08′15″N 68°38′16″W
- Country: United States
- State: Maine
- County: Hancock
- Incorporated: 1897

Area
  - Total: 37.84 sq mi (98.01 km^{2})
  - Land: 9.81 sq mi (25.41 km^{2})
  - Water: 28.03 sq mi (72.60 km^{2})
- Elevation: 69 ft (21 m)

Population (2020)
  - Total: 1,056
  - Density: 108/sq mi (41.6/km^{2})
- Time zone: UTC−5 (Eastern (EST))
  - Summer (DST): UTC−4 (EDT)
- ZIP Code: 04681
- Area code: 207
- FIPS code: 23-74580
- GNIS feature ID: 582751
- Website: www.stoningtonmaine.org

Stonington is a town in Hancock County, Maine, United States. It is located on the southern portion of the island of Deer Isle. The population was 1,056 at the 2020 census. It includes the villages of Burnt Cove, Oceanville, Green Head, and Clam City. A picturesque working waterfront and tranquil tourist destination in eastern Penobscot Bay, Stonington has consistently ranked among the top lobster ports in the country and is the largest lobster port in Maine. In 2011, 14,854,989 pounds of lobster were landed by Stonington fishermen, with a value of $46.3 million.

== History ==
=== Deer Isle settlement ===
As far back as 6,100 years ago the first inhabitants of Deer Isle were Native Americans known as the Abenaki, speaking a language called Etchemin. One of the first Europeans to explore the area was Estevan Gomez, a Portuguese working for the Spanish Crown. Gomez sailed his ship La Anunciada up the Eggemoggin Reach, amongst other places along the Maine coast, looking for gold and the Northwest Passage. It was the French, however, who would be the most active in the region. Establishing a fort at Castine and intermarrying with Abenaki natives. A body buried in full French armor was discovered on nearby Campbell Island (+44° 13' 20.03", −68° 36' 33.24", south of Oak Point).

The first white settler of Deer Isle was one William Eaton (born 1720 Salisbury, Massachusetts, died c. 1790 Seabrook, New Hampshire) and family, arriving on the island prior to August 4, 1762. They settled in an area now known as Scott's Landing (so named for the second owner of the property: Nathaniel Scott) located near the Deer Isle/Little Deer Isle Causeway. By 1765, migration to Deer Isle had begun in earnest and Eaton, along with 16 other families, petitioned the governing state of Massachusetts for legal title to the land. The largest group of these first settlers came from Newburyport, Massachusetts and were mostly of Scottish and Irish descent. Ironically, those settlers had come looking for a new life on the land, not the sea. A few cellar holes and foundation stones from the original homesteads can still be found at Scott's Landing and the land they cleared is still open. Settlers continued their southward migration on the island and eventually established the village of Green's Landing (as Stonington was initially known) after 1800.

=== Green's Landing ===
==== Settlement ====
Hundred-acre "proprietor lots" were granted to those who first settled the island, accelerating the southward migration with the promise of new land. Within a few decades, the yields of acidic soil of the original proprietor lots began to decline and inhabitants of the island took to the sea. Green's Landing, settled c. 1800, was established by a few pioneering souls on the rocky, windswept southern shore of the island. That sparsely populated village became active in shipbuilding, seafaring, fishing and lobster fishing.

==== Granite ====
A barren settlement, Green's Landing changed little in its first 70 or so years; c. 1870, granite quarrying became a major occupation and little Green's Landing became a boom town. Europeans, mainly from Italy, immigrated to Green's Landing to implement their old-world skills as stonecutters and masons at the numerous in-town granite quarries. As the demand for stone increased, quarrying moved off-shore to the southerly surrounding islands. Crotch Island, the best known island quarry, was one of 33 major island quarries along the Maine coast, providing work for an estimated 10,000 to 15,000 people. Stone excavated in the area has been used to build important structures across the country, including the approaches to the Brooklyn Bridge (1880s), Croton Aqueduct (NY, 1880), Holyoke Dam (Holyoke, Massachusetts, 1890s), piers for Manhattan/Brooklyn Bridge (Manhattan, 1905), Museum of Fine Arts (Boston, 1907), Rockefeller fountain bowl (Pocantico, New York, 1913), John F. Kennedy Eternal Flame, (Arlington County, Virginia, 1966) and the new Yankee Stadium among many others. Some other major quarries in operation at the time were The Settlement Quarry (on Deer Isle), Green Island Quarry, and St. Helena Quarry (both separate island quarries).

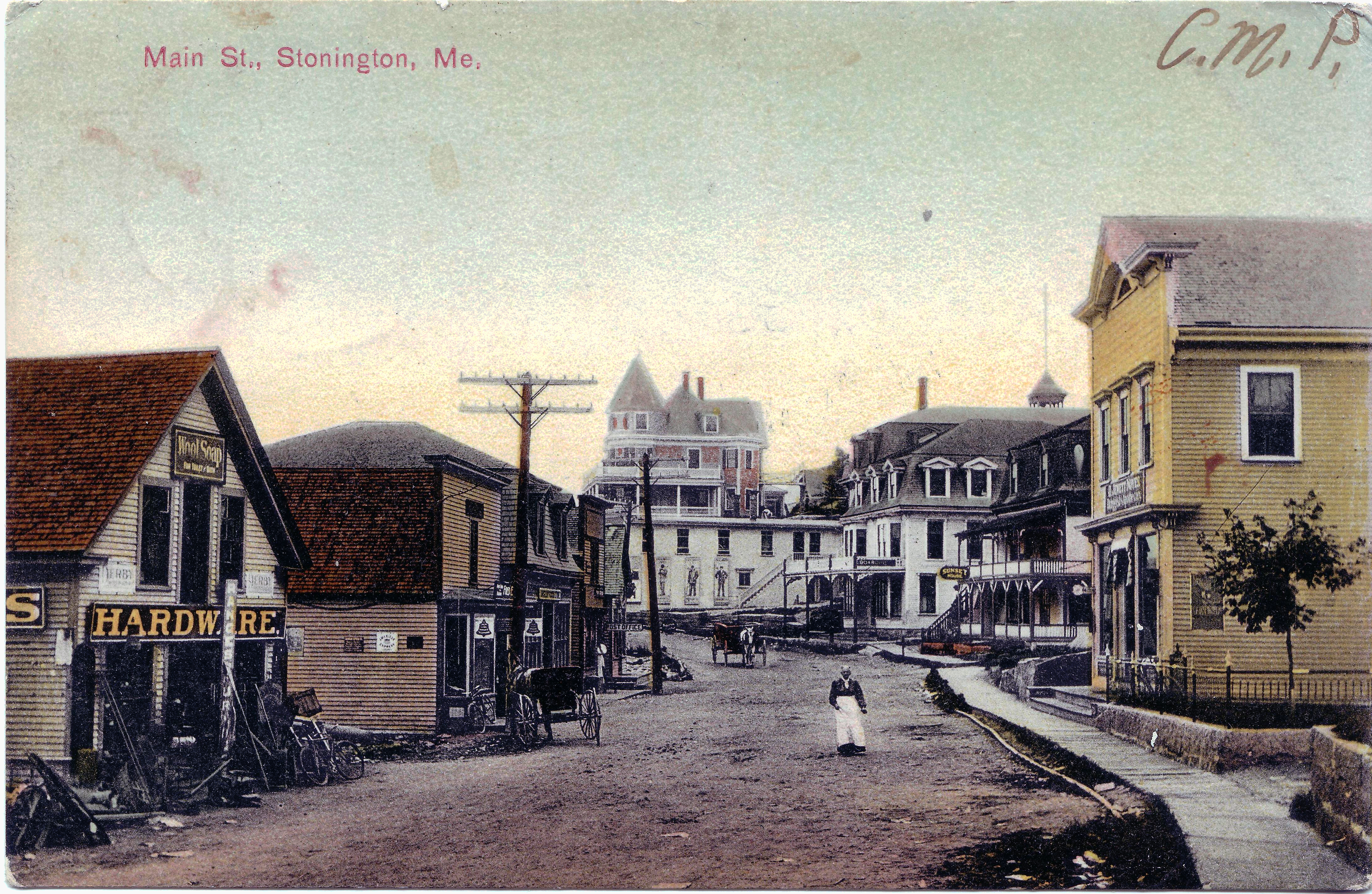
1907 Photo Postcard of Stonington, Maine. Downtown Main street looking west.

==== Boom town ====
Many of the new immigrants lived in hotels and large boarding houses built for that purpose at Green's Landing, the current Tewksbury Building being one of many still in use. Some of these new migrants were housed in bunkhouses on Crotch Island itself. Prior to building the Deer Isle-Sedwick bridge and causeway in 1939, the settlement's primary link to the outside world was Steamboat Wharf, located west of the main harbor. Once busy with vessels arriving daily from ports such as Rockland and Boston, it was the primary terminus for freight and passengers.

=== Lobstering and seafaring ===
Sailors on the island became renowned for their maritime skills. Full crews for two America's Cup teams were recruited from Deer Isle for the victorious America's Cup Races of 1895 on The Defender and again in 1899 on Columbia. The Stonington harbor has long been filled with Friendship Sloops among other boat designs, powered by sail only. Lobstermen once used them to haul traps. Most of their trips were to the outer islands (like York Island) near Isle au Haut, fishing during the week and returning to the harbor on weekends. This changed with the advent of gasoline or diesel engines, along with new hull designs, which enabled fishermen to make day trips to fishing grounds in Penobscot Bay.

=== Stonington incorporation ===
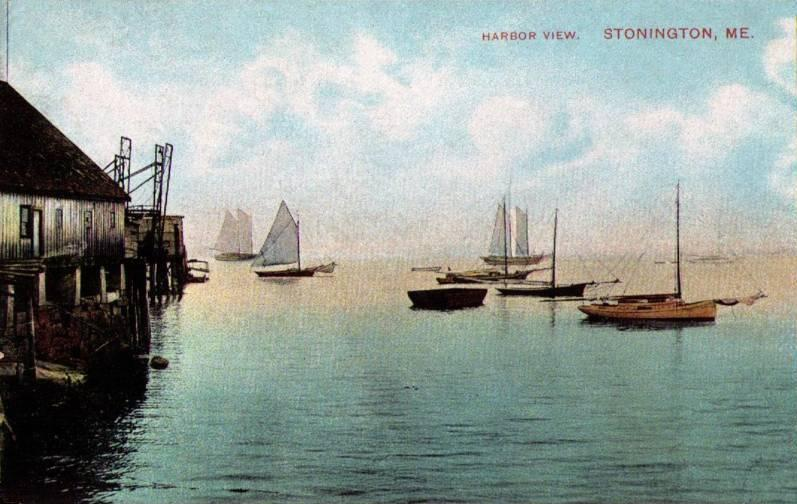
Harbor view c. 1910

On February 18, 1897, Green's Landing was set off and incorporated by the Maine State Legislature as Stonington—named for its granite quarries.

== Geography ==
According to the United States Census Bureau, the town has a total area of 37.84 square miles (98.01 km^{2}), of which 9.81 square miles (25.41 km^{2}) is land and 28.03 square miles (72.60 km^{2}) is water. Located on the southern end of Deer Isle, Stonington is situated in Penobscot Bay and the Gulf of Maine, part of the Atlantic Ocean. Stonington is the southern terminus of State Route 15, which passes through the town of Deer Isle and across the Deer Isle Bridge to the mainland.

== Demographics ==
Historical population
Census	Pop.	Note	%±
1900	1,648		—
1910	2,038		23.7%
1920	1,353		−33.6%
1930	1,418		4.8%
1940	1,493		5.3%
1950	1,660		11.2%
1960	1,408		−15.2%
1970	1,291		−8.3%
1980	1,273		−1.4%
1990	1,252		−1.6%
2000	1,152		−8.0%
2010	1,043		−9.5%
2020	1,056		1.2%
U.S. Decennial Census

=== 2010 census ===
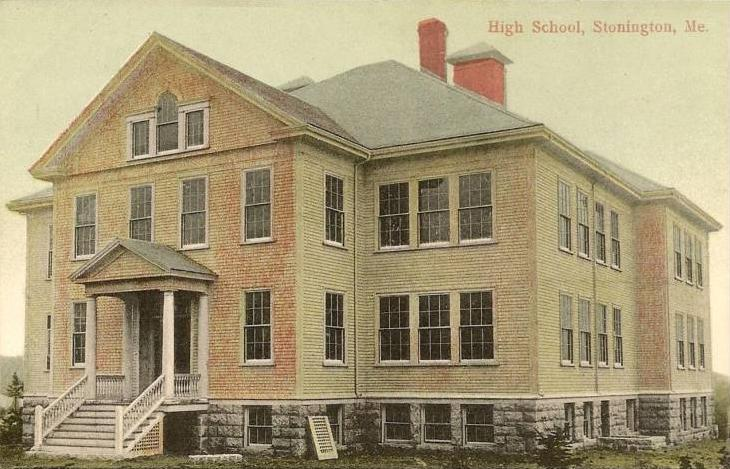
Old High School c. 1910

As of the census of 2010, there were 1,043 people, 515 households, and 305 families residing in the town. The population density was 106.3 inhabitants per square mile (41.0/km^{2}). There were 993 housing units at an average density of 101.2 per square mile (39.1/km^{2}). The racial makeup of the town was 97.0% White, 0.2% African American, 0.1% Native American, 0.3% Asian, 0.1% Pacific Islander, 0.4% from other races, and 1.9% from two or more races. Hispanic or Latino of any race were 0.4% of the population.

There were 515 households, of which 19.8% had children under the age of 18 living with them, 48.7% were married couples living together, 7.2% had a female householder with no husband present, 3.3% had a male householder with no wife present, and 40.8% were non-families. 34.2% of all households were made up of individuals, and 14.2% had someone living alone who was 65 years of age or older. The average household size was 2.03 and the average family size was 2.56.

The median age in the town was 50.7 years. 14.8% of residents were under the age of 18; 6.2% were between the ages of 18 and 24; 19.6% were from 25 to 44; 35.8% were from 45 to 64; and 23.4% were 65 years of age or older. The gender makeup of the town was 49.7% male and 50.3% female.

=== 2000 census ===
As of the census of 2000, there were 1,152 people, 502 households, and 326 families residing in the town. The population density was 117.5 inhabitants per square mile (45.4/km^{2}). There were 909 housing units at an average density of 92.7 per square mile (35.8/km^{2}). The racial makeup of the town was 96.79% White, 0.09% African American, 0.61% Native American, 0.43% Asian, 1.48% from other races, and 0.61% from two or more races. Hispanic or Latino of any race were 0.87% of the population.

There were 502 households, out of which 28.5% had children under the age of 18 living with them, 52.2% were married couples living together, 9.2% had a female householder with no husband present, and 34.9% were non-families. 28.1% of all households were made up of individuals, and 14.1% had someone living alone who was 65 years of age or older. The average household size was 2.29 and the average family size was 2.78.

In the town the population was spread out, with 23.4% under the age of 18, 6.9% from 18 to 24, 25.1% from 25 to 44, 26.4% from 45 to 64, and 18.3% who were 65 years of age or older. The median age was 42 years. For every 100 females there were 88.2 males. For every 100 females age 18 and over, there were 92.8 males.

The median income for a household in the town was $28,894, and the median income for a family was $34,375. Males had a median income of $27,500 versus $19,063 for females. The per capita income for the town was $15,634. About 9.6% of families and 12.7% of the population were below the poverty line, including 10.6% of those under age 18 and 16.5% of those age 65 or over.

== Education ==
It is in the Deer Isle-Stonington Community School District. The district has two schools in Deer Isle: Deer Isle-Stonington Elementary School and Deer Isle-Stonington High School.

Both schools are parts of School Union 76.
