= Deer Isle, Maine =

Town in Maine, United States

- Town
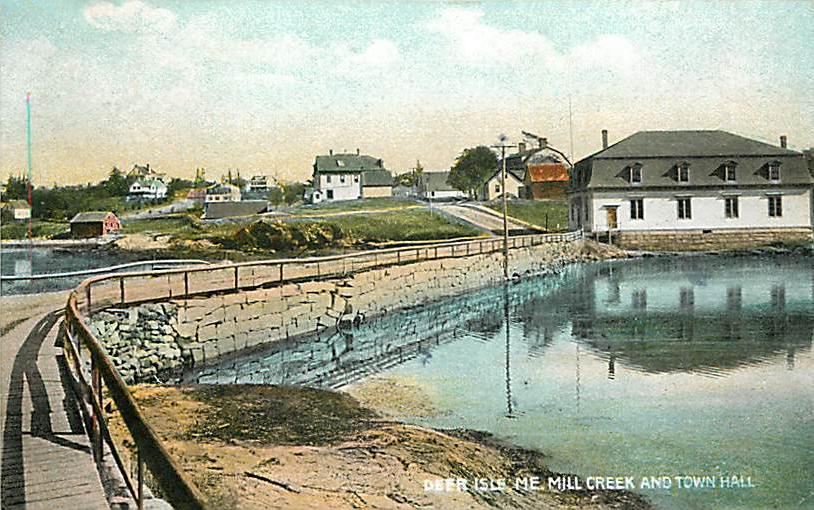
- Mill Creek and Town Hall in 1907

- Seal
- Motto: "Welcome To Our Beautiful Island"
- Location within Maine Location within the United States
- Coordinates: 44°13′29″N 68°40′37″W
- Country: United States
- state: Maine
- County: Hancock
- Incorporated: 1789
- Villages: Deer Isle; Eggemoggin; Little Deer Isle; Mountainville; North Deer Isle; Reach; South Deer Isle; Sunset; Sunshine

Area
  - Total: 123.67 sq mi (320.30 km^{2})
  - Land: 29.72 sq mi (76.97 km^{2})
  - Water: 93.95 sq mi (243.33 km^{2})
- Elevation: 0 ft (0 m)

Population (2020)
  - Total: 2,194
  - Density: 74/sq mi (28.5/km^{2})
- Time zone: UTC-5 (Eastern (EST))
  - Summer (DST): UTC-4 (EDT)
- ZIP Codes: 04627 (Deer Isle); 04650 (Little Deer Isle); 04683 (Sunset)
- Area code: 207
- FIPS code: 23-17145
- GNIS feature ID: 582437
- Website: www.deerislemaine.gov

Deer Isle is a town in Hancock County, Maine, United States. The population was 2,194 at the 2020 census. Notable landmarks in Deer Isle are the Haystack Mountain School of Crafts and Stonington Opera House.

== History ==
The town was incorporated in 1789, at which time it included the islands of Little Deer Isle, Deer Isle, and Isle au Haut. Deer were abundant on these islands, hence the name. In 1868 Isle au Haut became a separate town. In 1897, the southern third of Deer Isle incorporated as the town of Stonington.

In the 19th century, the granite industry flourished on Deer Isle, where its quarries supplied granite for structures such as the Boston Museum of Fine Arts, the Smithsonian Institution, the US Naval Academy, the Manhattan Bridge, and President John F. Kennedy's tomb at Arlington National Cemetery.

In 1931, Frederick Low Olmstead caught attention in New York newspapers when he filed a civil claim against the Astor family falsely alleging Deer Island had belonged to his ancestor Cotton Mather Olmstead in 1705 when Captain Kidd had come ashore, and the island was later allegedly sold to a man curiously named Jacques Cartier working for John Jacob Astor. In this fantastical tale, Cartier discovered Kidd's treasure in 1892 beneath a rock with a cross on the island, leading Astor to secretly sell it all. These claims sparked ongoing rumors of Kidd's treasure on the island, even though it seemed publications were widely contradicting each other whether this was the Deer Island in southern New Brunswick, near Penobscot Maine or off Boston Massachusetts.

In John Steinbeck's Travels with Charley, Deer Isle was a stopping point for the author after the insistence of his literary agent that he visit the cottage of Eleanor Brace, at Dunham's Point. Steinbeck wrote, "One doesn't have to be sensitive to feel the strangeness of Deer Isle".

It was Deer Isle that musician Dan Fogelberg and his wife Jean chose for their final home, and where he died in 2007. This isle was the home town of the dock that was the inspiration for the painter Fairfield Porter. Many small private islands can be found in the waters surrounding Deer Isle. Cabot Lyford, a Maine sculptor, used seven tons of Deer Isle granite to carve one of his best known pieces, Life Force. The sculpture, which depicts dolphins jumping from the water, stands outside the Regency Hotel in Portland.

== Geography ==
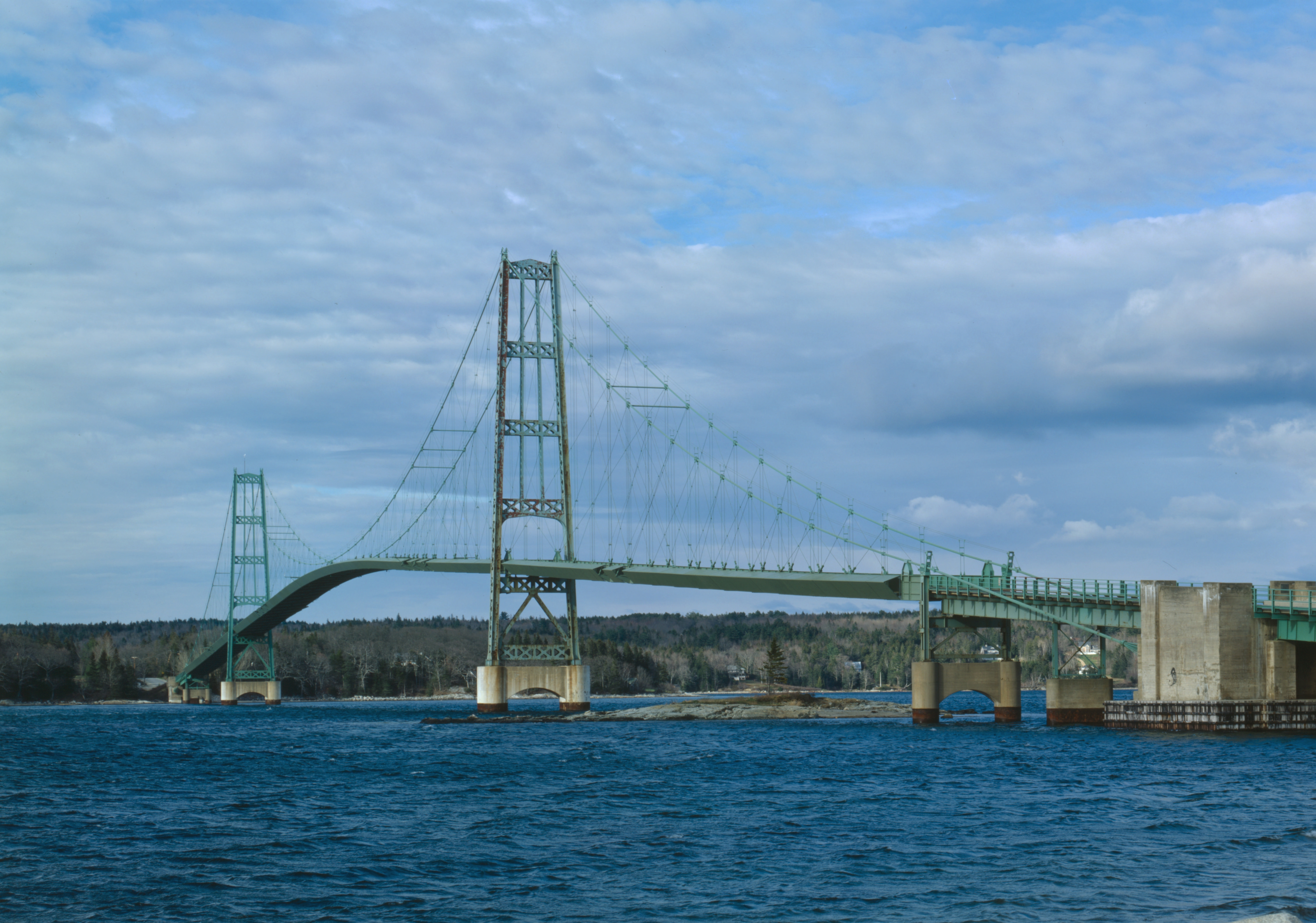
Deer Isle Bridge

The town of Deer Isle is one of two communities on the island of Deer Isle, the other being Stonington. According to the United States Census Bureau, the town has a total area of 123.67 square miles (320.30 km^{2}), of which 29.72 square miles (76.97 km^{2}) is land and 93.95 square miles (243.33 km^{2}) is water.

Deer Isle is separated from the mainland by Eggemoggin Reach and may be reached by car via a narrow 1939 suspension bridge bearing the island's name.

== Demographics ==
Historical population
Census	Pop.	Note	%±
1790	682		—
1800	1,094		60.4%
1810	1,507		37.8%
1820	1,842		22.2%
1830	2,228		21.0%
1840	2,841		27.5%
1850	3,037		6.9%
1860	3,590		18.2%
1870	3,414		−4.9%
1880	3,266		−4.3%
1890	3,422		4.8%
1900	2,047		−40.2%
1910	1,946		−4.9%
1920	1,718		−11.7%
1930	1,266		−26.3%
1940	1,303		2.9%
1950	1,234		−5.3%
1960	1,129		−8.5%
1970	1,211		7.3%
1980	1,492		23.2%
1990	1,829		22.6%
2000	1,876		2.6%
2010	1,975		5.3%
2020	2,194		11.1%
U.S. Decennial Census

=== 2010 census ===
As of the census of 2010, there were 1,975 people, 929 households, and 533 families living in the town. The population density was 66.5 inhabitants per square mile (25.7/km^{2}). There were 1,936 housing units at an average density of 65.1 per square mile (25.1/km^{2}). The racial makeup of the town was 98.1% White, 0.2% African American, 0.5% Native American, 0.2% Asian, and 1.0% from two or more races. Hispanic or Latino people of any race were 0.5% of the population.

There were 929 households, of which 20.8% had children under the age of 18 living with them, 46.5% were married couples living together, 5.8% had a female householder with no husband present, 5.1% had a male householder with no wife present, and 42.6% were non-families. 35.4% of all households were made up of individuals, and 21.1% had someone living alone who was 65 years of age or older. The average household size was 2.05 and the average family size was 2.61.

The median age in the town was 51.6 years. 16.3% of residents were under the age of 18; 6.8% were between the ages of 18 and 24; 18% were from 25 to 44; 30.8% were from 45 to 64; and 28.2% were 65 years of age or older. The gender makeup of the town was 46.9% male and 53.1% female.

=== 2000 census ===
As of the census of 2000, there were 1,876 people, 781 households, and 523 families living in the town. The population density was 63.2 inhabitants per square mile (24.4/km^{2}). There were 1,575 housing units at an average density of 53.0 per square mile (20.5/km^{2}), and the racial makeup of the town was 98.61% White; 0.16% African American; 0.11% Native American; 0.21% Asian; and 0.91% from two or more races. Hispanic or Latino people of any race were 0.37% of the population.

There were 781 households, of which 29.1% had children under the age of 18 living with them, 57.0% were married couples living together, 5.6% had a female householder with no husband present, and 33.0% were non-families. 28.2% of all households were made up of individuals, and 14.6% had someone living alone who was 65 years of age or older. The average household size was 2.32 and the average family size was 2.82.

In the town, the population was spread out, with 22.5% of the population under the age of 18, 4.9% from 18 to 24, 23.6% from 25 to 44, 26.5% from 45 to 64, and 22.5% who were 65 years of age or older. The median age was 44 years. For every 100 females, there were 94.8 males. For every 100 females age 18 and over, there were 88.5 males.

The median income for a household in the town was $32,826, and the median income for a family was $40,714. Males had a median income of $27,008 versus $19,052 for females. The per capita income for the town was $16,875. About 5.9% of families and 8.8% of the population were below the poverty line, including 5.8% of those under age 18 and 11.8% of those age 65 or over.

== Education ==
It is in the Deer Isle-Stonington Community School District. The district has two schools in Deer Isle: Deer Isle-Stonington Elementary School and Deer Isle-Stonington High School.

Both schools are parts of School Union 76.

== Notable people ==
- Gerald Warner Brace (1901–1978), writer, professor, sailor and boat builder
- Holly Eaton, politician and resident of Deer Isle
- Dan Fogelberg (1951–2007), singer and songwriter, composer, multi-instrumentalist
- Buckminster Fuller (1895–1983), architect and inventor
- Robert McCloskey (1914–2003), author and illustrator of children's books
- Francis Sumner Merritt (1913–2000), painter, co-founder of Haystack Mountain School of Crafts
- Frederick Law Olmsted (1822–1903), early urban planner and landscape architect
- Ronald Hayes Pearson (1924–1996), designer, jeweler, and metalsmith
- Thomas E. Ricks (born 1955), Pulitzer Prize-winning journalist and author
- Anica Mrose Rissi, author and writer brought up in Deer Isle
- Salome Sellers (1800–1909), last known and documented living person born in the 18th century
- Cynthia Voigt (born 1942), young adults book author

== Cultural references ==
- Deer Isle is heavily referenced in Ken Burns' docuseries The Civil War. Stories from the town are used to illustrate the impact the American Civil War had on places across the United States, even towns like Deer Isle which were far away from most of the war's battles. 21 residents of Deer Isle were killed fighting in the war.
- Anica Mrose Rissi's 2023 middle grade novel Wishing Season is set on, and dedicated to, Deer Isle. In an interview, Rissi described the book as "a love letter to the place where I grew up, its people and its landscape—to the saltwater-spruce-granite air, the pets and wild animals I loved, and the community of storytellers that shaped me. And it’s about what it’s like to live in and love a place that’s an essential part of who you are, but where you don’t always fully belong—what it’s like to sometimes feel like an outsider in your own hometown."
- Tire Tracks, a 40-minute documentary by director John Steed, commissioned by Opera House Arts, explores the local practice of burning rubber to create black marks on the road as a form of graffiti. The documentary, which was filmed on Deer Isle and released in 2006, features several island residents.
