= May Massee =

American children's book editor

- Born: May 1, 1881; Chicago, Illinois, U.S.
- Died: December 24, 1966 (aged 85); New York City, New York, U.S.
- Occupation: Editor
- Known for: Children's books

May Massee (May 1, 1881 – December 24, 1966) was an American children's book editor. She was the founding head of the juvenile departments at Doubleday from 1922 and at Viking Press from 1932. Before working at Doubleday, she edited the American Library Association periodical Booklist.

== Biography ==
=== Early life ===
May Massee was born on May 1, 1881, as the third of five children to Charlotte and Francis Massee in Chicago. Before attending school, she learned to read and became interested in drawing and painting through the illustrations of the books. When she was five, her family moved to Milwaukee where she attended the public schools. She graduated from high school at the age of sixteen and attended the state normal school there for two years before teaching elementary school for a year.

=== Career ===
Massee worked with a librarian for some time in Wisconsin before attending the Wisconsin Library School in Madison. She worked in several libraries until she was encouraged to work in the children’s room of the Buffalo Public Library. This experience deepened her understanding and love of children through the way they responded to the books, and was foundational to her later career as an editor teaching her to always keep in mind the end reader in the process. Each summer, she also took a trip to teachers' college summer schools to present children's books to school superintendents and teachers who had very little of children's literature. While she enjoyed this work, she accepted the tempting offer to become editor of Booklist forcing her to move back to Chicago in 1913. As the editor for Booklist, she was first to go to New York to talk to publishers about upcoming books, and have full-time staff reviewers. Her role overlapped publishing, book-selling, and library work which developed close relationships between publishers and librarians.

At the 1920 American Library Association (ALA) Conference in Colorado Springs, she reported that she would be working with Mabel Williams, a librarian at the New York Public Library (NYPL), to edit and grade approximately 600 children's books, titles concerning children for teachers, and expressed the need for a high-quality list of high school level books.

In 1922, Doubleday, Page and Company (currently Doubleday) invited Massee to help them open and run their new juvenile's department, the second in the nation after Louise Seaman at Macmillan four years earlier. The hopes of these new children's departments was to produce high-quality literature for children to enjoy, enrich their lives, and develop a life-long love of reading. Accepting the offer, she took issue with a sales manager who was hired without her knowledge and was acting as if he were in charge of the department. She protested his involvement and after resigning on the spot, she was assured the sales manager would not undermine her work and she moved to New York. When he continued to interfere, a new position was found for him at a different company in California. At Doubleday, Massee was able to see and become knowledgeable in the whole process of production including costs, estimates, printing processes, sales at Doubleday's press in Garden City, Long Island. She headed the department by publishing stories by foreign authors in foreign locations during the period of isolation after World War I. Many of her books were also published abroad in both English and in translations. Massee made a point of working with artists and illustrators who had not previously done work for children and discovered and encouraged work beyond what authors and illustrators believed their capabilities to be.

In 1932, Massee was fired from Doubleday and Viking Press jumped at the opportunity to hire her to found their new children’s book department in 1933. She worked with Viking Press as editor and director until her retirement in 1960, twenty-seven years later. However, she continued working with Viking Press as an advisory editor until her death from a stroke at her home in New York City on December 24, 1966.

== Influence ==
Many of the books Massee edited won prestigious children's literary awards. More than twenty were runner-up for the annual Caldecott Medal from the children's librarians, which recognizes the year's "most distinguished American picture book for children". Her motto was "Nothing too much, not even moderation." She often encouraged her authors to try new things and experiment with their stories and illustrations. Willing to take risks, she helped to establish high critical standards for children’s literature. She published books that were not considered popular: books with minority protagonists, stories set in Russia, Hungary, etc. Critics acknowledged Massee’s ability regarding text, design, and illustration as well as her endorsement of new methods of production such as offset lithography. Several books published by Massee have since become classics, such as The Story About Ping (1933), The Good Master (1935), The Story of Ferdinand (1936), Madeline (1939), and Make Way for Ducklings (1941). She was one of the first to publish stories about African-American children written or illustrated by African-American writers and artists.

In 1936, The Horn Book dedicated its July/August issue to May Massee and her work. Editors, writers, author-illustrators, librarians, a book designer, and book-sellers sang her praises. Frances Clarke Sayers wrote of Massee, "She not only responds to creative work when it is completed but she senses the hidden possibilities in the writers and artists themselves." She was able to respond with enthusiasm and uplift those who worked with her positively without discouraging them.

Ludwig Bemelmans, the creator of Madeline, once wrote to Massee explaining his attitude in writing a children's book: "We are writing for Children but not for Idiots".

== Awards and legacy ==
In 1950, she received the Constance Lindsay Skinner Medal from the Women's National Book Association for "achievement in the realm of books."

In 1959, Massee was awarded the American Institute of Graphic Arts AIGA Medal for "exceptional achievements, services or other contributions to the field of graphic design and visual communication". She was the first woman to receive the award, as she had been the first to join the organization.

The May Massee Collection highlights the solidity, scope, continuity, and quality of her work. It was formed by colleagues and friends of Massee, including Margaret Lesser Foster, Robert McCloskey, and Elizabeth Gray Vining, in 1967 and donated to what is now Emporia State University in 1972.

Publishing highlights
Date	Title	Author	Significance
1925	Puck in Pasture	Elizabeth MacKinstry	
1927	Milady at Arms	Edith Bishop Sherman and illustrated by Marguerite de Angeli	
1930	Angus and the Ducks	Marjorie Flack	
1931	The Magic Rug	Ingri and Edgar Parin d'Aulaire	
1933	Ask Mr Bear	Marjorie Flack	
1932	Abraham Lincoln	Ingri and Edgar Parin d'Aulaire	Caldecott Medal winner
1932	Ola	Ingri and Edgar Parin d'Aulaire	
1933	Aesop's Fables	Boris Artzybasheff	
1933	Ola and Blakken, and Line, Sine, Trine	Ingri and Edgar Parin d'Aulaire	
1933	Seven Simeons: A Russian Tale	Boris Artzybasheff	Caldecott Medal honor
1933	The Conquest of the Atlantic	Ingri and Edgar Parin d'Aulaire	
1933	The Story About Ping	Marjorie Flack	
1935	Children of the Northlights	Ingri and Edgar Parin d'Aulaire	
1936	The Story of Ferdinand	Munro Leaf and illustrated by Robert Lawson	
1938	Little Pancho	Leo Politi	
1938	The White Stag	Kate Seredy	Newbery Medal winner
1938	Wee Gillis	Munro Leaf and illustrated by Robert Lawson	Caldecott Medal honor
1939	Daniel Boone	James Daugherty	Newbery Medal winner
1939	Madeline	Ludwig Bemelmans	Caldecott Medal honor
1940	They Were Strong and Good	Robert Lawson	Caldecott Medal winner
1941	Make Way for Ducklings	Robert McCloskey	Caldecott Medal winner
1942	Adam of the Road	Elizabeth Gray Vining	Newbery Medal winner
1942	Andries	Hilda van Stockum	
1944	Rabbit Hill	Robert Lawson	
1945	You Can Write Chinese	Kurt Wiese	Caldecott Medal honor
1948	In Norway	Gudrun Thorne-Thomsen and illustrated by Eyvind Earle	
1954	Madeline's Rescue	Ludwig Bemelmans	Caldecott Medal winner
1958	Fly High, Fly Low	Don Freeman	Caldecott Medal honor
1958	Time of Wonder	Robert McCloskey	Caldecott Medal winner
1963	The Snowy Day	Ezra Jack Keats	Caldecott Medal winner

== Bibliography ==
- Emil and the Detectives, Erich Kastner, Translated by May Massee, Doubleday (1930)
