= Anne Louise Brillon de Jouy =

French musician (1744–1824)

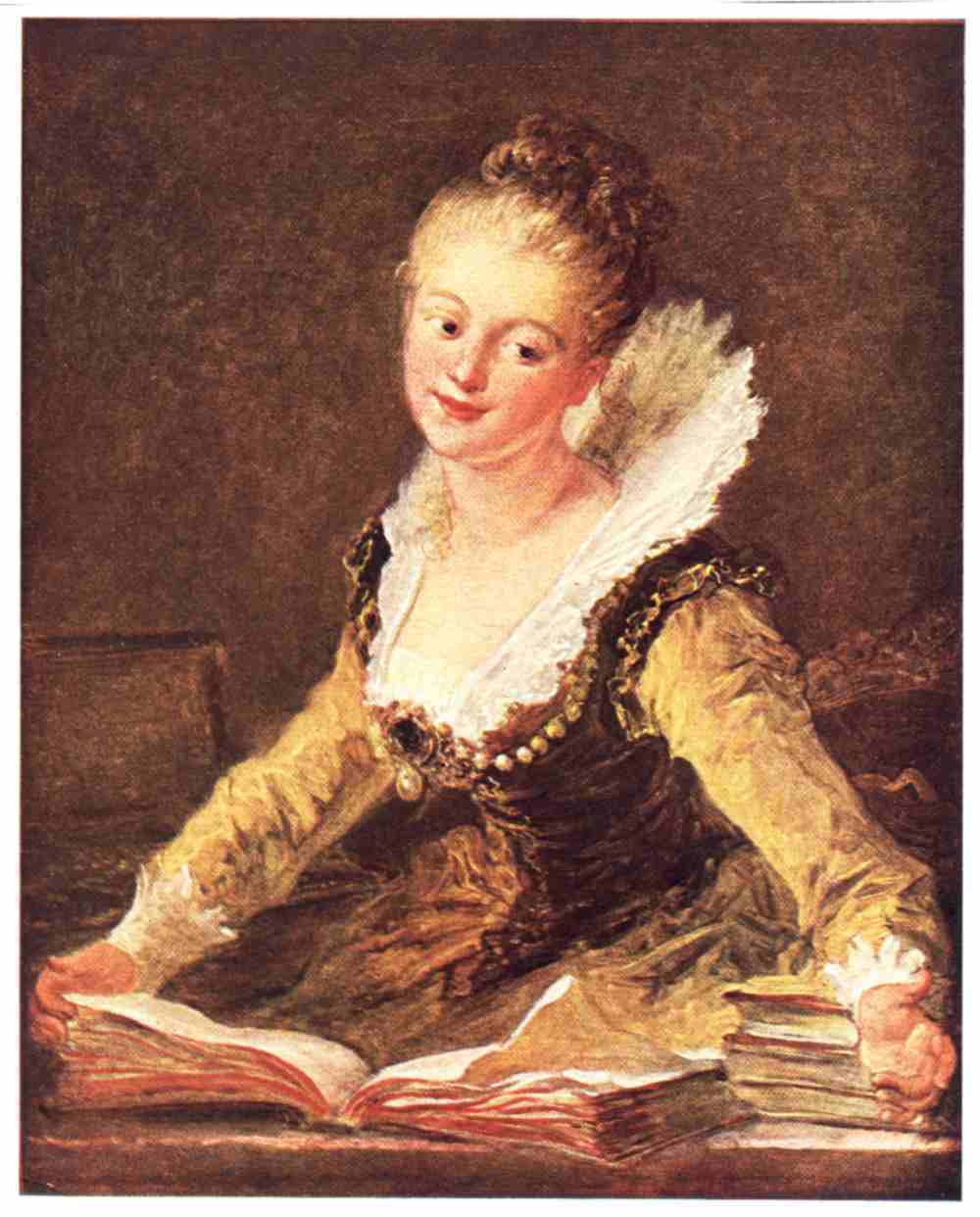
- Portrait of Anne Louise Brillon de Jouy painted by Jean-Honoré Fragonard
- Born: Anne Loise Boyvin d'Hardancourt; 13 December 1744; Paris
- Died: 5 December 1824 (aged 79); Villers-sur-Mer (Calvados)
- Occupations: musician and composer
- Spouse: Jacques Brillon de Jouy (m. 1763; died 1787)
- Children: 2

Anne Louise Brillon de Jouy (née Boyvin d'Hardancourt; 13 December 1744 – 5 December 1824) was a French musician and composer. Born in Paris, she lived in Passy and played and composed for the harpsichord and the piano. She learned to play the harpsichord as a child.

== Life ==
Her parents were Marie-Élisabeth (née Martin; 1723-1785) and Louis-Claude Boyvin d'Hardancourt (c. 1710 – 1756), a royal tax clerk. In October 1763 Anne Louise married tax clerk Jacques Brillon de Jouy (1722–1787), 22 years her elder. They had two daughters, Cunégonde and Aldegonde. Cunégonde went on to marry the General Antoine Marie Paris d'Illins.

She died at Villers-sur-Mer, Calvados, aged 79.

== Career ==
Every Wednesday and Saturday Anne Louise held a salon at her house in the country in Passy, which became a permanent fixture. Foreign musicians passing through Paris performed with her. In doing so, she acquired an excellent reputation as a musician and composer, despite not performing publicly or having any of her compositions published. Several composers dedicated sonatas to her, including Johann Schobert, Luigi Boccherini, Charles Burney, Ernst Eichner, and Henri-Joseph Rigel.

Her compositions number almost 90. Most are instrumental chamber music, including solo and accompanied keyboard sonatas; sonatas for cello, violin or harp; trios for two harpsichords and piano; and vocal music. She wrote music to perform herself and with the two Brillon daughters, Cunégonde and Aldegonde. The piano music written for her own performance is virtuosic, incorporating new keyboard techniques and sonorities, along with a number of innovations usually associated with later pianist-composers such as Czerny and Liszt. Her manuscripts are in a private French collection and in the American Philosophical Society library in Philadelphia.

In 1767, Boccherini composed in Paris his Six Sonatas for Pianoforte and Violin op 5. The set was dedicated to Anne Louise Brillon: Madame, I have never before composed for the keyboard; I heard you play on that instrument, and then I wrote these sonatas; the homage that I offer you through them is, simultaneously, a fitting tribute, and one of reconnaissance; you have inspired them, and you embellish them. The piano was a relatively new instrument when Boccherini wrote his Six Sonatas op 5, but Anne Louise Brillon de Jouy inspired him to write the keyboard part specifically for the new instrument, including dynamic markings. When the sonatas were published in 1769, the reference to the pianoforte was replaced by "harpsichord" and many dynamic markings were removed because the harpsichord was still the dominant keyboard instrument, and the publisher had to adapt the sonatas for commercial reasons. Charles Burney wrote of her, She is one of the greatest lady-players on the harpsichord in Europe. This lady (...) plays the most difficult pieces with great precision, taste and feeling (...). She likewise composes, and she was so obliging as to play several of her own pieces both on the harpsichord and pianoforte accompanied with the violin by M. Pagin, who is reckoned in France the best scholar of Tartini ever made.

When Benjamin Franklin arrived in Paris in 1777 as ambassador from the American colonies, he lived near the Brillon residence and was a welcome guest at her distinguished salon, which he described as 'my Opera', where there are 'little Concerts' with music and singing. They became close friends and that same year, after she heard of the decisive American victory at Saratoga, she composed the Marche des insurgents (March of the Insurgents) to celebrate the colonies' victory in the American Revolutionary War, the first song written for the new American nation. She and Franklin maintained an active correspondence after his return to the United States in 1785.

== Works ==
88 pieces have been listed to date.

=== 1775-1783 ===
- Trio pour trois clavecins en ut-mineur (ou pour piano anglais, piano allemand et clavecin). (Trio for three harpsichords in C-minor, or for English piano, German piano, and harpsichord)
- Premier recueil d'œuvres pour clavecin ou pianoforte avec 15 sonates pour pianoforte et violon. (First collection of works for harpsichord or pianoforte, with 15 sonatas for pianoforte and violin)
- Sonate en la mineur pour pianoforte. (Sonata in A minor for pianoforte)
- Trio pour pianoforte, violon et violoncelle en sol mineur. (Trio for piano, violin, and cello in G minor)
- Quatuor pour clavecin, deux violons et contrebasse en mi mineur. (Quartet for harpsichord, two violins, and double bass in E minor)

=== 1777 ===
- Marche des insurgents. ("March of the Insurgents", which was first published in an arrangement for brass quintet in 1992 by the Hildegard Publishing Company)

=== 1779-1785 ===
- Duos pour clavecin et pianoforte. (Duets for harpsichord and pianoforte)

== In popular culture ==
Madame Brillon appears in the children's book Ben and Me (1939) by Robert Lawson, where she is the subject of an elaborate, humorous full-page illustration. She does not appear in the Disney Academy Award-nominated animated short film adaptation Ben and Me (1953).

Madame Brillon is played by the actress Ludivine Sagnier in the Apple TV+ original limited-run television series Franklin (2024).

== Bibliography ==
- Christine de Pas, Madame Brillon de Jouy et son salon : Une musicienne des Lumières, intime de Benjamin Franklin, Paris, Éditions du Petit Page, 2014, 306 p. (ISBN 978-2-9538403-4-6, BNF 44213135).
- Rebecca Cypess, Women and Musical Salons in the Enlightenment Chicago and London: University of Chicago Press, 2022. 368 p. ISBN 9780226817910.

== Discography ==
- "The Piano Sonatas Rediscovered", Nicolas Horvath, piano. Naxos: Grand Piano GP872-73 (2020). 2-CD album.
- "In the Salon of Madame Brillon: Music and Friendship in Benjamin Franklin's Paris", The Raritan Players, directed by Rebecca Cypess. Acis Productions APL40158 (2021).
