= Ferdinand (film) =

2017 animated film by Blue Sky Studios

- Theatrical release poster
- Directed by: Carlos Saldanha
- Screenplay by: Robert L. Baird; Tim Federle; Brad Copeland
- Story by: Ron Burch; David Kidd; Don Rhymer
- Based on: The Story of Ferdinand by Munro Leaf and Robert Lawson
- Produced by: John Davis; Lisa Marie Stetler; Lori Forte; Bruce Anderson
- Starring: John Cena; Kate McKinnon; Bobby Cannavale; Peyton Manning; Anthony Anderson; David Tennant; Gina Rodriguez; Daveed Diggs; Gabriel Iglesias; Miguel Ángel Silvestre
- Cinematography: Renato Falcão
- Edited by: Harry Hitner
- Music by: John Powell
- Production companies: 20th Century Fox Animation; Blue Sky Studios; Davis Entertainment
- Distributed by: 20th Century Fox
- Release dates: December 10, 2017 (Los Angeles); December 15, 2017 (United States)
- Running time: 108 minutes
- Country: United States
- Language: English
- Budget: $111 million
- Box office: $307.5 million

Ferdinand is a 2017 American animated comedy-drama adventure film directed by Carlos Saldanha and starring the voices of John Cena, Kate McKinnon, Bobby Cannavale, Peyton Manning, Anthony Anderson, David Tennant, Gina Rodriguez, Daveed Diggs, Gabriel Iglesias, and Miguel Ángel Silvestre. Loosely based on Munro Leaf and Robert Lawson's 1936 children's book The Story of Ferdinand, it was produced by 20th Century Fox Animation, Blue Sky Studios, and Davis Entertainment. The story follows a pacifist bull named Ferdinand (Cena) who, after escaping a bullfighting-training ranch and settling at a flower farm, is captured and brought back to the ranch, where he must overcome the expectations of a violent tradition and lead a misfit team on a perilous journey across Spain to escape once again and return home.

Ferdinand premiered on December 10, 2017, in Los Angeles, and was theatrically released in the United States on December 15, 2017 by 20th Century Fox. Despite receiving mixed reviews from critics and underperforming domestically, the film fared better internationally, grossing $307 million worldwide against a production budget of $111 million and received a nomination for Best Animated Feature at the 90th Academy Awards, as well as nominations at the 75th Golden Globe Awards for Best Animated Feature Film and Best Original Song ("Home").

== Plot ==
In Spain, a calf named Ferdinand lives with other bulls at Señor Moreno's Casa del Toro, whose owner trained them for bullfighting. Ferdinand is a pacifist, which his peers, Valiente, Guapo, and Bones mock. The matador arrives, and the fathers fight to impress him, Ferdinand's father Raf is picked, so Valiente crushes Ferdinand's flower in retaliation. Raf does not come back from the ring, and Ferdinand runs away from Casa del Toro to a flower farm owned by Juan and his daughter Nina adopts him.

Years later, Ferdinand has grown into an enormous but still gentle bull. One day, Ferdinand looks too scary to take along to the annual flower festival in Ronda, as in previous years. Ferdinand follows them anyway, but is stung by a bee and panics, accidentally destroying the town square and wreaking havoc in a china shop. Animal control officers deem him dangerous, and take him away before Juan and Nina can explain.

The officers give him to Casa del Toro, where he reunites with Valiente, Bones, and Guapo, as well as Lupe, a female goat, and two new bulls, Angus and Maquina. Ferdinand tries to escape, but is stopped by three Lipizzan horses Klaus, Greta, and Hans.

The next day, snooty matador El Primero arrives, needing a bull for his final bullfight before retirement. Moreno puts all the bulls in a ring to fight it out, but Ferdinand refuses to take part, causing mishaps when he tries to help Guapo recover from a stage fright-induced faint. El Primero gives Moreno two days to get the bulls into shape, Guapo is sent to a chop house, as non-fighters now become meat.

The next day, Ferdinand begins to bond with the other bulls, but Valiente mocks them for wasting valuable practice time, causing them to reluctantly abandon Ferdinand and return to training.

With the help of three hedgehog siblings Una, Dos, and Cuatro, Ferdinand and Lupe try to escape through the house. Ferdinand finds a wall of horns in a trophy room, including his father Raf. Realizing that bulls die whether they are selected or not, Ferdinand goes back and warns the other bulls to leave Casa del Toro. Valiente refuses to accept the truth and starts fighting Ferdinand, accidentally breaking off his own horn. He is taken to the chop house, and Ferdinand is chosen by El Primero, who believes he deliberately injured Valiente.

With the aid of his friends, Ferdinand rescues Valiente, as well as Guapo, who had not yet been killed. Together, Lupe, the bulls, the hedgehogs and Bunny, a rabbit, Ferdinand had almost accidentally killed earlier steal a truck and flee to Madrid, causing El Primero to send out Moreno and his men to retrieve Ferdinand. The bulls arrive to the Atocha train station and Ferdinand helps the others get aboard the train, but sacrifices himself to buy them time to get away. He and Lupe are captured by Moreno and brought to the ring, but a video of the bulls' escape has made the news. Recognizing Ferdinand on TV, Juan's dog Paco alerts Juan and Nina to come see the broadcast; realizing where Ferdinand is, the three rush off to Madrid to save him.

At Las Ventas, Ferdinand, after being convinced by Lupe that he must survive, refuses to fight and starts running around in blind panic, accidentally knocking over and humiliating El Primero, who wounds him with a banderilla. Ferdinand nearly retaliates until he sees a carnation crushed beneath his hoof, reminding him of his time with Nina. Ferdinand spares El Primero and sits down, waiting to be killed, but the crowd demands El Primero to let Ferdinand live, which he obliged, putting down his sword and leaving with dignity. Ferdinand's pacifism makes him the first bull to survive a bullfight, and he is reunited with Nina. Moreno then brings Lupe, Ferdinand and the other bulls, along with the hedgehogs and Bunny, to live at Nina's farm.

== Voice cast ==
- John Cena as Ferdinand, a big-hearted, flower-loving Spanish Fighting Bull who does not want to fight and believes in looking out for others.
  - Colin H. Murphy voices Ferdinand as a calf.
- Kate McKinnon as Lupe, an elderly goat and Ferdinand's self-appointed mentor
- Bobby Cannavale as Valiente, an arrogant Spanish Fighting Bull who abuses Ferdinand for his flower-loving personality and reluctance to fight. He was one of the two last bulls to befriend Ferdinand, doing so by helping save Guapo.
  - Jack Gore voices a calf Valiente.
  - Cannavale also voices Valiente's father, a cruel and ferocious bull who hates everyone, including his own son. His attitude rubs off on Valiente.
- Peyton Manning as Guapo, a loudmouthed Spanish Fighting Bull who has stage fright and is also bullied by Valiente. He is one of the two last bulls to befriend Ferdinand.
  - Jet Jurgensmeyer voices a calf Guapo
- Anthony Anderson as Bones, an undersized but agile bull of nondescript breeding. He is Guapo's friend, and the first of the bulls to befriend Ferdinand.
  - Nile Diaz voices a calf Bones
- David Tennant as Angus, a Scottish Highland bull who had hair over his eyes until Ferdinand licked it. He is the second bull to befriend Ferdinand.
- Tim Nordquist as Maquina, a lab-cloned Belted Galloway who never speaks, but only grunts and growls. He is the third bull to befriend Ferdinand. In the film he is frequently compared to Frankenstein, especially when he manages to bite through an electric fence unharmed.
- Lily Day as Nina, the original owner of Paco and Ferdinand. She and her father later adopt Lupe, and all of Moreno's bulls.
  - Julia Scarpa Saldanha voices a young Nina.
- Juanes as Juan, the father of Nina
- Jerrod Carmichael as Paco, a Bearded Collie owned by Nina and Juan
- Miguel Ángel Silvestre as El Primero, an egotistical matador.
- Raúl Esparza as Moreno, the owner of Casa del Toro, who wants to impress Primero
- Gina Rodriguez as Una, a short violet hedgehog who is Dos and Cuatro's sister
- Daveed Diggs as Dos, a skinny indigo hedgehog, Una and Cuatro's brother
- Gabriel Iglesias as Cuatro, a chubby blue hedgehog, Una and Dos' brother
- Flula Borg as Hans, a Lipizzan horse at Casa del Toro
- Boris Kodjoe as Klaus, a Lipizzan horse at Casa del Toro
- Sally Phillips as Greta, a Lipizzan mare at Casa del Toro
- Jeremy Sisto as Raf, Ferdinand's father who died in a bullfight
- Cindy Slattery as Bunny, an unnamed crimson red rabbit

== Production ==
In 2011, it was reported that 20th Century Fox Animation had acquired the rights to the children's book The Story of Ferdinand by Munro Leaf to adapt it into a computer-animated feature film with Carlos Saldanha attached to direct it. In May 2013, Fox titled the film simply Ferdinand, which would be produced by Blue Sky Studios. John Powell, a frequent collaborator with Saldanha, would be composing the film's score. In November 2016, it was reported that Gabriel Iglesias would voice a character named Cuatro, Una and Dos' brother.

== Soundtrack ==
On September 19, 2017, it was announced that singer Nick Jonas wrote and recorded a song called "Home" for the film, released as the promotional single of the soundtrack on October 20, 2017. A second original song by Jonas, "Watch Me", was released alongside the six-song EP on December 1. It features three original tracks, with the third song "Lay Your Head On Me" by Juanes. The fourth song "Castle On The Hill" by Ed Sheeran.

It was the last time Powell composed a Blue Sky film before the studio shut down on April 10, 2021. His score was released by Fox Music on December 15, 2017.

== Release ==
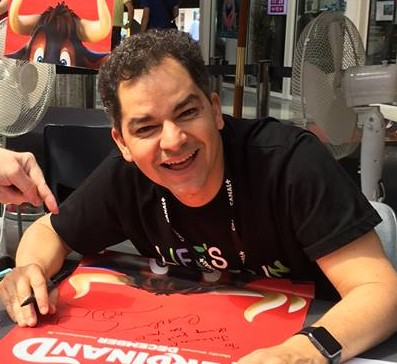
Director Carlos Saldanha signing the film's poster at the 2017 Annecy International Animation Film Festival

In May 2013, Fox scheduled the film for April 7, 2017 release. In February 2016, the release date was pushed back from its original release date of April 7, 2017 to July 21, 2017. In August 2016, the release date was again pushed back, this time from July 21, 2017, to December 22, 2017, taking over the release date of DreamWorks Animation's The Croods: A New Age, before that film was temporarily cancelled, put back in production, and eventually released on November 25, 2020, by its new distributor Universal Pictures, following NBCUniversal's acquisition of DreamWorks Animation in 2016. In February 2017, the film was moved up by one week from December 22, 2017, to December 15, 2017. The first trailer premiered on March 28, 2017, followed by the second trailer on June 14, 2017.

=== Home media ===
Ferdinand was released on Digital HD on February 27, 2018, and was released on DVD and Blu-ray on March 13, 2018.

The film was made available for streaming on Disney+ on January 8, 2021, in the United States, following The Walt Disney Company's acquisition of 20th Century Fox in 2019.

== Reception ==
=== Box office ===
Ferdinand has grossed $84.4 million in the United States and Canada, underperforming at the North American box office, and $223.1 million in other countries, for a worldwide total of $307.5 million, against a production budget of $111 million.

In the United States and Canada, Ferdinand was released alongside Star Wars: The Last Jedi, and was projected to gross $15–20 million from 3,621 theaters in its opening weekend. It made $350,000 from Thursday night previews at 2,385 theaters, which began at 5 P.M. and $3.6 million on its first day. It went on to open to $13.3 million, finishing second behind The Last Jedi.

=== Critical response ===
On review aggregator Rotten Tomatoes, the film has an approval rating of 71% based on 117 reviews and an average rating of 6.2/10. The site's critical consensus reads, "Ferdinand's colorful update on a classic tale doesn't go anywhere unexpected, but its timeless themes – and John Cena's engaging voice work in the title role – make for family-friendly fun." On Metacritic, the film has a weighted average score of 58 out of 100, based on 20 critics, indicating "mixed or average" reviews. Audience polled by CinemaScore gave the film an average grade of "A" on an A+ to F scale.

Spanish bullfighting critic of El País, Antonio Lorca, in a critique of the film, said that the film's message is "profoundly unnatural", and that the "renunciation" of the lead character to its "animal nature" is a lie that manipulates children, who will become "tomorrow's anti-bullfighters". ElDiario.es commented on this article by Lorca, saying that it had been widely commented on social networks and that the anti-bullfighting narrative of the film "raised hackles" for its message against animal abuse, which can also be interpreted as "fight against school bullying" and "implicit defense of sexual and gender diversity". Ben Kenigsberg of The New York Times gave the film a positive review, saying, "Unlike in the book, Ferdinand earns the arena's cheers for not fighting, but the crowd's sense of surprise will elude audiences attending Ferdinand." Susan Wloszczyna of Rogerebert.com gave the film a three out of four stars and said, "Enough of that kind of bull. What the world needs now is Ferdinand, sweet Ferdinand, a rare breed of bovine who takes a stand against aggression, competitive rivalry and conforming to the expectations of others." James Dyer of Empire gave the film a three out of five stars, saying, "Inoffensive fun, but unlike its paperback forebear, the cinematic Ferdinand is unlikely to stand the test of time."

Simran Hans of The Guardian gave the film a four out of five stars and said, "A flower-sniffing bull goes on a journey of self-discovery in this fun adaptation of a 30s children's book." Michael Rechtshaffen of The Hollywood Reporter also gave a positive review for the film, saying, "It's no Coco, but Ferdinand, a CG-animated adaptation of the classic 1936 Munro Leaf and Robert Lawson book about a flower-loving bull who'd rather sniff than fight, manages to squeak by with enough charming set-pieces and amusing sight gags to compensate for a stalling storyline." Katie Welsh of Chicago Tribune gave the film a negative review of two stars, saying, "With a lovely voice performance from Cena, the spirit of Ferdinand does shine through. But the rest of the story filler is mostly forgettable." Tara Brady of The Irish Times also gave the film a three out of five stars, saying, "Ferdinand may lack the all-out charm offensive of the studio's 2015 Snoopy and Charlie Brown vehicle, but it's not too far off in terms of quality and sweetness."

Jane Horwitz of The Denver Post gave the film a positive review, noting that the adaptation "brims with bumptious fun and droll characters" while maintaining the story's moral heft and "poignant emotions" and resulting in a film that expands Ferdinand's world without losing the original book's gentle charm. Alonso Duralde of TheWrap also gave the film a positive review, saying that while it suffers from an excess of characters and subplots, it remains a "charming and energetic fable" that successfully translates a simple children's story into a "feature-length" comedy with genuine "heart" and "brilliant slapstick." David Bedwell of Frame Rated gave the film a positive review, saying that "with an entertaining mix of comedy, drama, and heart," its "heartwarming journey" captures the essence of its source material by balancing "ludicrous" slapstick with a "meaningful story" that "translates to the heart of human emotion."

=== Accolades ===
Award	Date of ceremony	Category	Recipients	Result	Ref.
Academy Awards	March 4, 2018	Best Animated Feature	Carlos Saldanha and Lori Forte	Nominated	
Annie Awards	February 3, 2018	Production Design in an Animated Feature Production	Thomas Cardone; Arden Chan; Andrew Hickson; Mike Lee; Jason Sadler	Nominated	
Annie Awards	February 3, 2018	Editorial in an Animated Feature Production	Harry Hitner; Tim Nordquist	Nominated	
Golden Globe Awards	January 7, 2018	Best Animated Feature Film	Carlos Saldanha	Nominated	
Golden Globe Awards	January 7, 2018	Best Original Song	"Home"	Nominated	
Cinema Audio Society Awards	February 24th 2018	Outstanding Achievement in Sound Mixing for a Motion Picture – Animated	Bill Higley, Randy Thom, Lora Hirschberg, Leff Lefferts, Shawn Murphy and Scott Curtis	Nominated	
Guild of Music Supervisors Awards	February 8, 2018	Best Song/Recording Created for a Film	"Home"	Nominated	
Humanitas Prize	February 16, 2018	Feature – Family	Ron Burch & David Kidd, Don Rhymer, Robert L. Baird and Tim Federle and Brad Copeland	Won	
Kids' Choice Awards	March 24, 2018	Favorite Animated Film	Ferdinand	Nominated	
Producers Guild of America Awards	January 20, 2018	Outstanding Producer of Animated Theatrical Motion Picture	Lori Forte and Bruce Anderson	Nominated	
Visual Effects Society Awards	February 13, 2018	Outstanding Effects Simulations in an Animated Feature	Yaron Canetti, Allan Kadkoy, Danny Speck, Mark Adams	Nominated	
Movieguide Awards	March 2018	Best Movie for Families	Ferdinand	Nominated	
