= Don Lusk =

American animator and director (1913–2018)

Donald R. "Don" Lusk
- Born: October 28, 1913; Burbank, California, U.S.
- Died: December 30, 2018 (aged 105); San Clemente, California, U.S.
- Occupations: Animator, director
- Years active: 1933–1993
- Employer(s): Walt Disney Productions (1933–1961); Walter Lantz Productions (1960–1961); Hanna-Barbera (1961–1993); Grantray-Lawrence Animation (1966); Bill Melendez Productions (1969-1977); DePatie–Freleng Enterprises (1972)
- Children: 2
- Awards: Winsor McCay Award (2014)

Donald Ross "Don" Lusk (October 28, 1913 – December 30, 2018) was an American animator and director.

Lusk joined Walt Disney Productions in 1933 and remained there until 1960, animating on most of the studio's features of the period, among them Pinocchio, Fantasia, Bambi, Cinderella, Peter Pan, Lady and the Tramp and One Hundred and One Dalmatians. He interrupted that work to serve in the United States Marine Corps animation unit during World War II.

After leaving Disney he worked briefly for Walter Lantz Productions and then moved into direction, working on the Peanuts television specials for Bill Melendez and, from 1961, at Hanna-Barbera, where he directed episodes of series including The Flintstones, Scooby-Doo and The Smurfs. He received the Winsor McCay Award for lifetime achievement in 2014 and, by the time of his death at 105, was the last surviving animator from Disney's golden age.

== Early life ==
Donald Ross Lusk was born on October 28, 1913, in Burbank, a suburb of Los Angeles, California to Perceval Knox Lusk and Louise Opie Ross Parrish, who were married in 1908 in California. He served in the United States Marine Corps for three years, during World War II, in its newly created Animation Unit.

== Career ==
Lusk was hired by The Walt Disney Company in 1933 as an Inbetweener. His first film as an animator was 1938's Ferdinand the Bull adapted from 1936's The Story of Ferdinand by author Munro Leaf. He worked on Pinocchio, Fantasia (The Nutcracker Suite and The Pastoral Symphony Segments), Bambi, Song of the South, Melody Time, So Dear to My Heart, The Adventures of Ichabod and Mr. Toad, Cinderella, Alice in Wonderland, Peter Pan, Lady and the Tramp, Sleeping Beauty and One Hundred and One Dalmatians.

Lusk left Disney in 1960, but continued to work as an animator during the 1960s and 1970s. During the early 1960s, he worked at Walter Lantz Productions under Jack Hannah's unit. Aside from animation, Lusk also directed multiple cartoon films and series, including the Peanuts TV specials and movies and for the Hanna-Barbera studio. His work at the latter included The Flintstones, The Jetsons, Scooby-Doo, The Smurfs, and Tom and Jerry. His Peanuts credits as an animator include A Boy Named Charlie Brown, It's the Easter Beagle, Charlie Brown and Be My Valentine, Charlie Brown.

In the early 1990s, Lusk retired after a career which spanned some 60 years.

== Recognition ==
In 2014 Lusk was one of three recipients of the Winsor McCay Award, the animation industry's lifetime achievement award, presented at the 42nd Annie Awards alongside Didier Brunner and Lee Mendelson.

== Personal life and death ==
Lusk married Marge Lusk, who worked in the Personnel Department of Disney Studios in Burbank. The couple had two children. He died on December 30, 2018, in San Clemente, California, aged 105. Long time friend, Navah-Paskowitz Asner, announced the news of his death on social media.

== Filmography ==
=== As animator (Walt Disney Productions) ===
Year	Title	Credits	Characters
1940	Pinocchio	Animator	
1940	Fantasia	Animator - Segments "The Nutcracker Suite" and "The Pastoral Symphony"	
1942	Bambi	Animator	
1946	Song of the South	Animator	
1948	Melody Time	Character Animator	
1949	So Dear to My Heart	Animator	
1949	The Adventures of Ichabod and Mr. Toad	Character Animator	
1950	Cinderella	Character Animator	
1951	Alice in Wonderland	Character Animator	
1952	Lambert the Sheepish Lion (Short)	Animator	
1952	Trick or Treat (Short)	Animator	
1953	Peter Pan	Character Animator	
1953	Ben and Me (Short)	Animator	
1955	Lady and the Tramp	Character Animator	
1959	Sleeping Beauty	Character Animator	
1954-1959	The Magical World of Disney (TV Series)	Animator – 5 Episodes	
1961	One Hundred and One Dalmatians	Character Animator	
2002	Mickey's House of Villains (Video)	Animator - Segment "Trick or Treat"	

=== As director (selected) ===
- The Smurfs (1981–1989)
- The Flintstone Kids (1986–1988)
- Scooby-Doo television series
