= Four and Twenty Blackbirds =

"Four and twenty blackbirds" is a line from the English nursery rhyme "Sing a Song of Sixpence"

Four and Twenty Blackbirds may also refer to:

== Literature ==
- Four-and-Twenty Blackbirds, a children's story book by Edward Thomas (1915)
- Four and Twenty Blackbirds, a picture book by Robert Lawson and winner of an inaugural Caldecott honor
- Four-and-Twenty Blackbirds (retitled The Secret of Galleybird Pit), a novel by Malcolm Saville (1959)
- "Four and Twenty Blackbirds", a short story by Agatha Christie from the anthology The Adventure of the Christmas Pudding (1960)
- "Four and Twenty Blackbirds", a book by Australian poet Francis Brabazon (1975)
- "The Case of the Four and Twenty Blackbirds", a short story by Neil Gaiman from the anthology M Is for Magic (1984)
- Four-and-Twenty Blackbirds, a book by Mercedes Lackey (1997)
- Four & Twenty Blackbirds (novel), by Cherie Priest (2000)

== Television ==
- "Four and Twenty Blackbirds", an episode of the British television series Agatha Christie's Poirot based on the short story (1989)
- "Four and Twenty Blackbirds", an episode of the British television series The Chief (1994)
- "Four and Twenty Blackbirds", an episode of the British television series Wycliffe (1995)
- "Twenty-Four Japanese Thrushes" (originally "Four and Twenty Blackbirds"), an episode of the Japanese anime series Agatha Christie's Great Detectives Poirot and Marple (2005)

== See also ==
- Four and Twenty Blackbirds Soaring, a book of poetry by Louis Daniel Brodsky (1989)
- Four'n Twenty, an Australian brand of meat pies and sausage rolls
