= Ferris Wheel (1893) =

First Ferris wheel

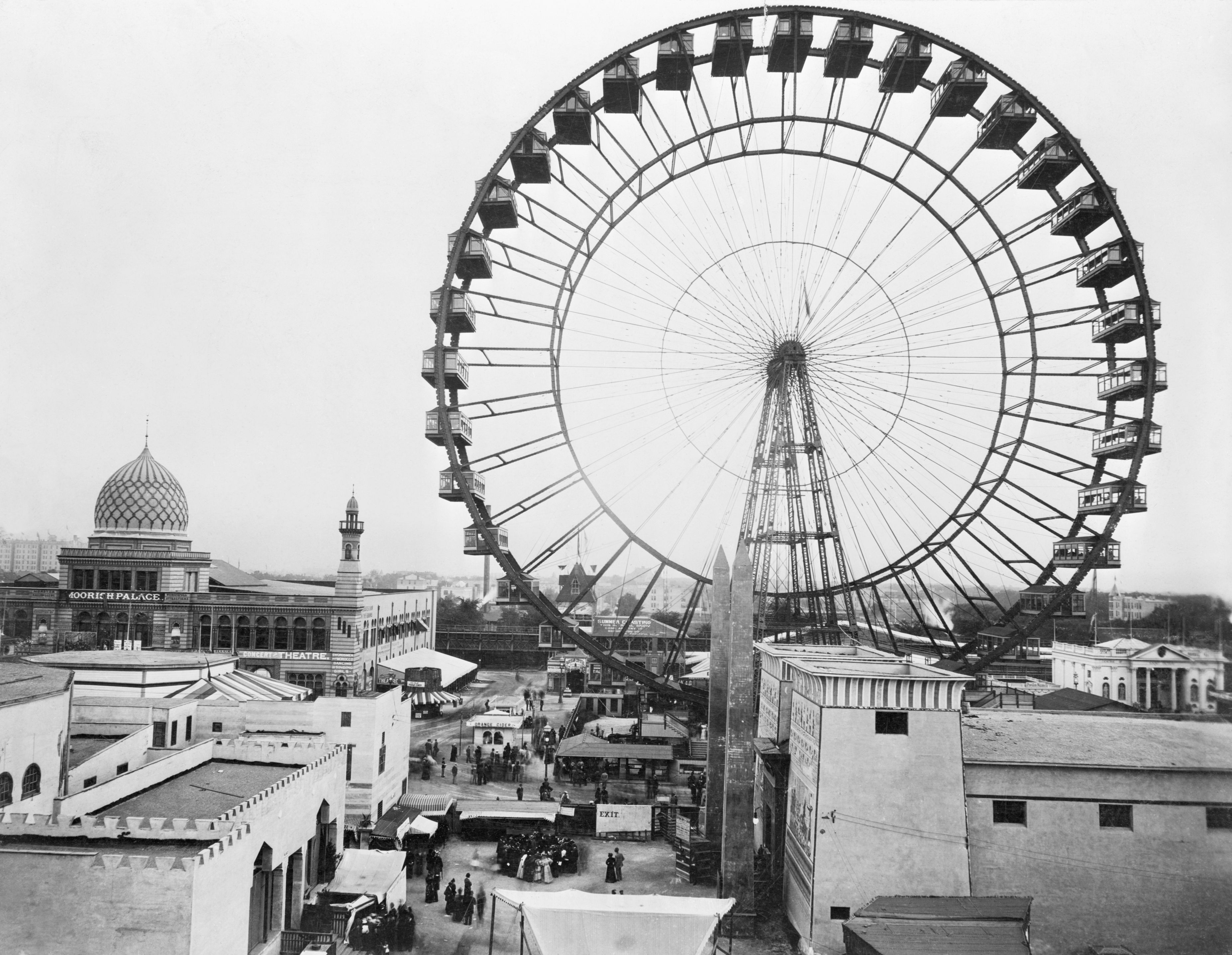
- George Washington Gale Ferris Jr.'s wheel
- Alternative names: Chicago Wheel

General information
- Status: Demolished
- Location: Chicago, United States
- Opened: June 21, 1893; 133 years ago
- Demolished: May 11, 1906
- Cost: $385,000

Height
- Height: 80.4 metres (264 ft)

Design and construction
- Known for: World's first Ferris Wheel

The original Ferris Wheel, sometimes also referred to as the Chicago Wheel, was designed and built by George Washington Gale Ferris Jr. as the centerpiece of the Midway at the 1893 World's Columbian Exposition in Chicago, Illinois. Since its construction, many other Ferris wheels have been constructed that were patterned after it.

Intended as a keystone attraction similar to that of the 1889 Paris Exposition's 324-metre (1,063 ft) Eiffel Tower, the Ferris Wheel was the Columbian Exposition's tallest attraction, with a height of 80.4 metres (264 ft).

The Ferris Wheel was dismantled and then rebuilt in Lincoln Park, Chicago, in 1895, and dismantled and rebuilt a third and final time for the 1904 World's Fair in St. Louis, Missouri. It was ultimately demolished in 1906. In 2007, the wheel's 45 foot, 70-ton axle was reportedly discovered buried near where it was demolished.

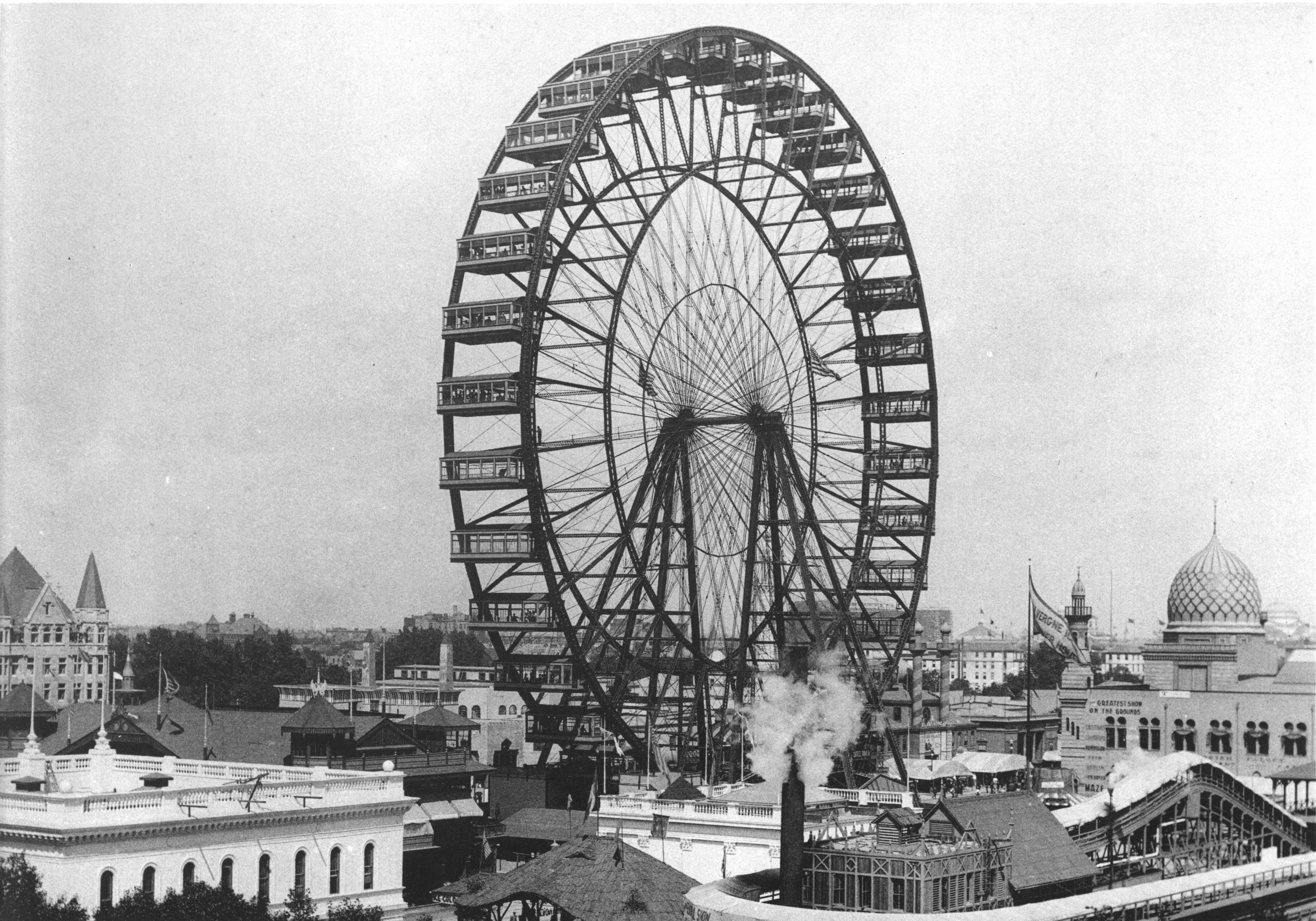
The original 1893 Chicago Ferris Wheel

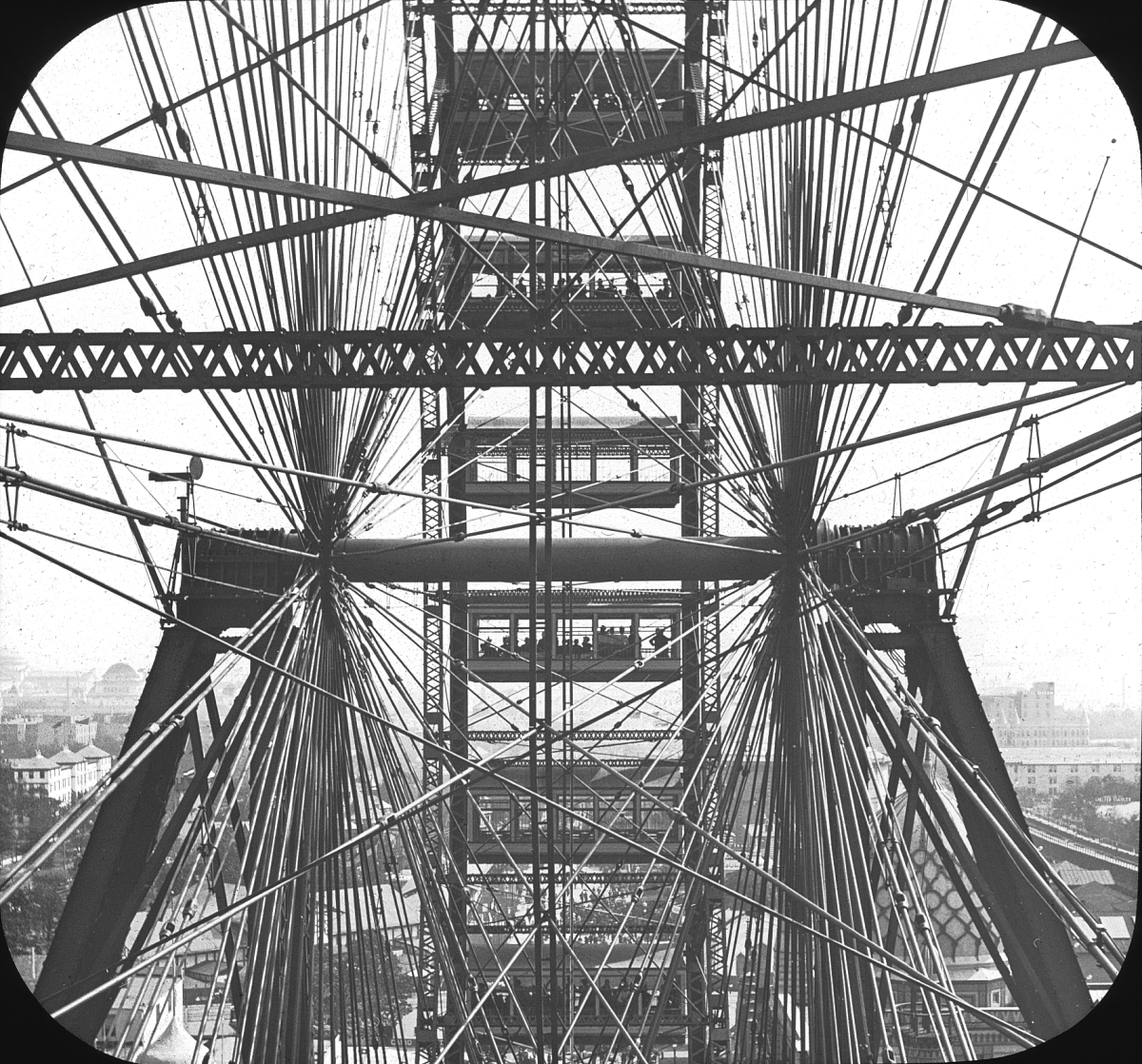
View through the Ferris Wheel

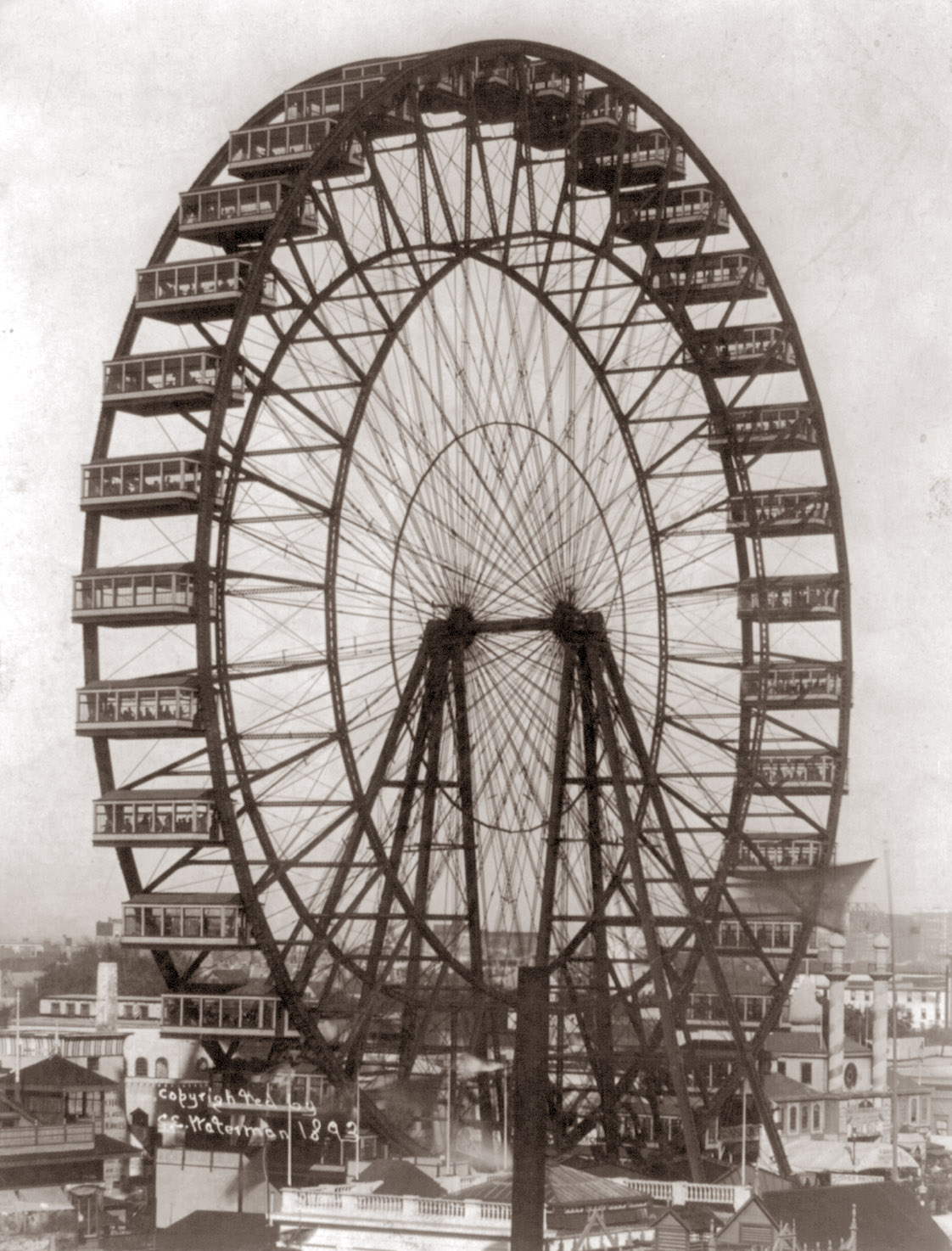

== Early history ==
External image
- Axle of the 1893 Chicago Ferris Wheel

Before the Ferris wheel, the Eiffel tower stood as a new centerpiece in Paris and an idea that was thought to be needed in the States. Gustave Eiffel himself amongst other inventors had many ideas as to how they could bring this tower over to the states, but ultimately, Ferris thought up the idea of a monumental wheel. When Ferris presented his ideas to a team of metal workers – Daniel Burnham and his team thought the idea to be unsafe and unable to be done. Ferris kept on with the wheel ideas and proposed a bigger and taller tower, to stand as its own centerpiece at the World's Columbian Exposition. Ferris's team brought the project to life and was able to give this new attraction to 1.4 million people in June 1893.

== Design and construction ==
The Ferris Wheel was designed and constructed by Ferris, a graduate of Rensselaer Polytechnic Institute and a Pittsburgh, Pennsylvania bridge-builder. Ferris began his career in the railroad industry before pursuing an interest in bridge building. He understood the growing need for structural steel and founded G.W.G. Ferris & Co. in Pittsburgh, a firm that tested and inspected metals for railroads and bridge builders.

The wheel was constructed in Jackson Park during the winter of 1892–93. To create a foundation for the wheel, dynamite was used to break through three feet of frozen ground. Piles of timber were driven thirty-two feet into the ground, on top of which was laid a grillage of steel that was then filled with concrete. Jets of steam were used by workers to thaw dirt and prevent the poured concrete from freezing. With the foundation in place, the wheel was then constructed.

The completed wheel rotated on a 71-ton, 45.5-foot-long (13.9 m) axle that was at that time the world's largest hollow forging. It was manufactured in Pittsburgh by the Bethlehem Iron Company and weighed 89,320 pounds (40,510 kg), together with two 16-foot-diameter (4.9 m) cast-iron spiders weighing 53,031 pounds (24,054 kg). There were 36 passenger cars, each fitted with 40 revolving chairs and able to accommodate up to 60 people, giving a total capacity of 2,160.

On June 9, 1893, the wheel was primed for a test run with great anticipation and a good deal of anxiety. The engine that would activate the wheel was fueled by steam boilers whose underground mains rushed steam to propel the pistons of its thousand-horsepower engines. Upon first seeing the wheel which towered over everything in its vicinity, Julian Hawthorne, son of the author Nathaniel, was amazed that anything of such a size "continues to keep itself erect ... it has no visible means of support – none that appear adequate. The spokes look like cobwebs; they are after the fashion of those on the newest make of bicycles". Ferris modeled his invention after the structural principles of a waterwheel near his childhood home in Nevada and modeled after the structural principles of a bicycle wheel. The Ferris wheel was supported by an enormous axle and powered by a one-thousand-horsepower steam engine. Correspondents made repeated requests for drawings and information, but Ferris would not release the details. As a consequence, no copies of the original plans or calculations have survived.

Both Ferris and his associate W. F. Gronau also recognized the engineering marvel the wheel represented, as a giant wheel that would turn slowly and smoothly without structural failure had never before been attempted.

For its inaugural run, no cars had yet been attached. The workmen however, climbed the structure and settled themselves on the spokes to the accompaniment of cheers from an audience of fair employees who had gathered to watch the momentous event. After the wheel had completed its first rotation, Gronau deemed the test a success. "I could have yelled out loud for joy".

The wheel was erected at a cost of $385,000.

== Operation ==
The Ferris Wheel took 20 minutes to make two revolutions, the first involving six stops to allow passengers to exit and enter and the second a nine-minute non-stop rotation, for which the ticket holder paid 50 cents (equivalent to $17.92 in 2025).

The Ferris Wheel first opened to the public as the centerpiece of the World's Columbian Exposition at Midway Plaisance in Chicago on June 21, 1893, and continued to operate there until after the exposition ended in October 1893.

Almost 1.5 million paid to ride on the wheel, generating a profit of $395,000.

== After the Columbian Exposition ==
Chicago, Grande Roue (1896), Lumière Brothers catalog no. 338)

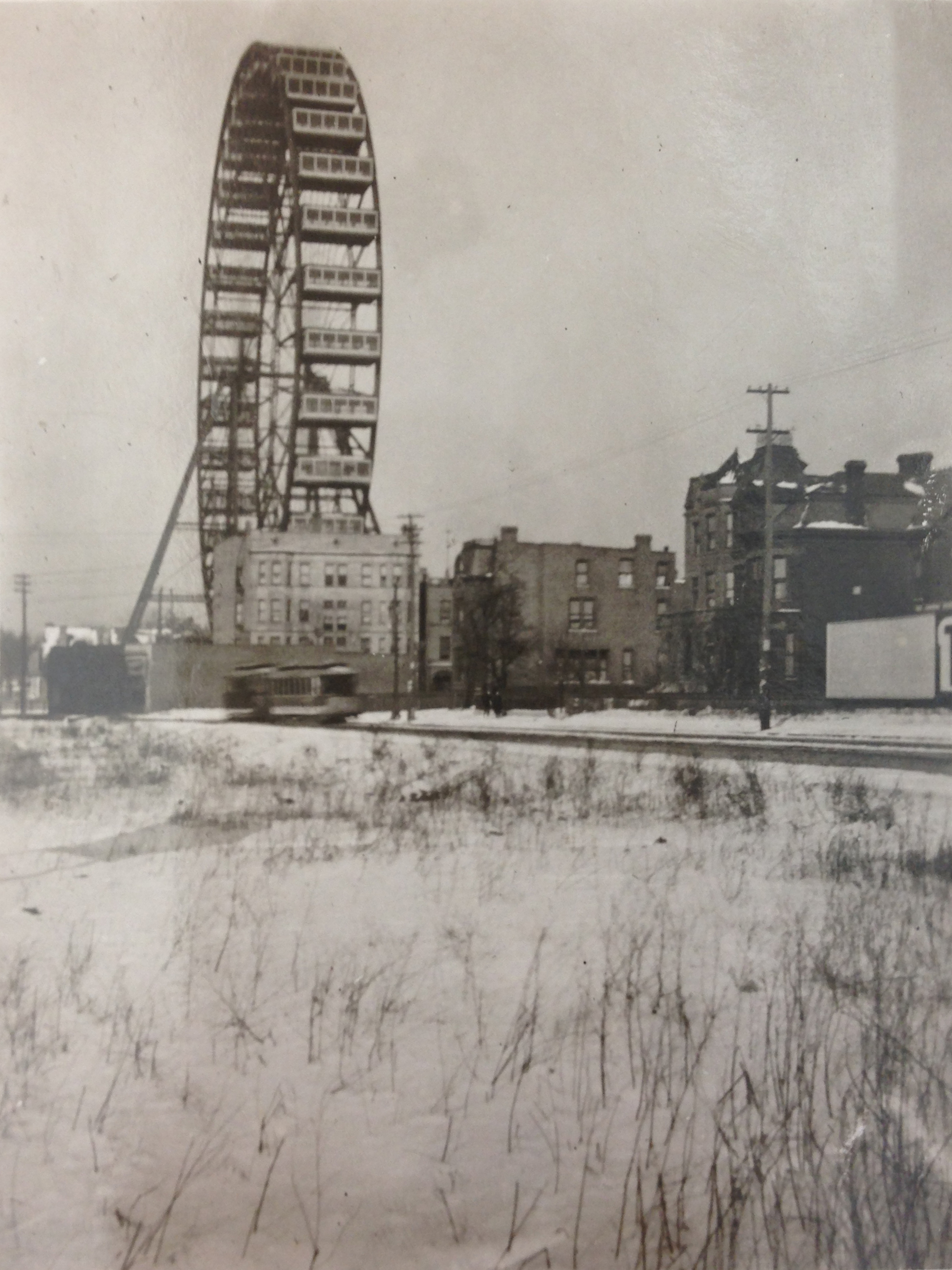
The Ferris Wheel in Lincoln Park, Chicago, looking north from Wrightwood Avenue

The wheel itself closed in April 1894 and was then dismantled and stored until the following year, when it was rebuilt in the Lincoln Park, Chicago, neighborhood. The amusement park was located at 2619 to 2665 N. Clark, which is now the location of a McDonald's and a high-rise residential building. The original plan was to include a beer garden and vaudeville show, but the liquor license was not granted. William D. Boyce, then a local resident, filed a Circuit Court action against the owners of the wheel to have it removed, but without success.

In 1896, Alexandre Promio created a short film for the Lumière Brothers (catalogue number 338) at the intersection of Wrightwood and Clark that included the Ferris Wheel. It is one of the first films of Chicago.

The wheel operated at Clark St. from October 1895 until 1903, when it was purchased at auction by the Chicago House Wrecking Company (CHWC) for $8,150 (equivalent to $292,040 in 2025).

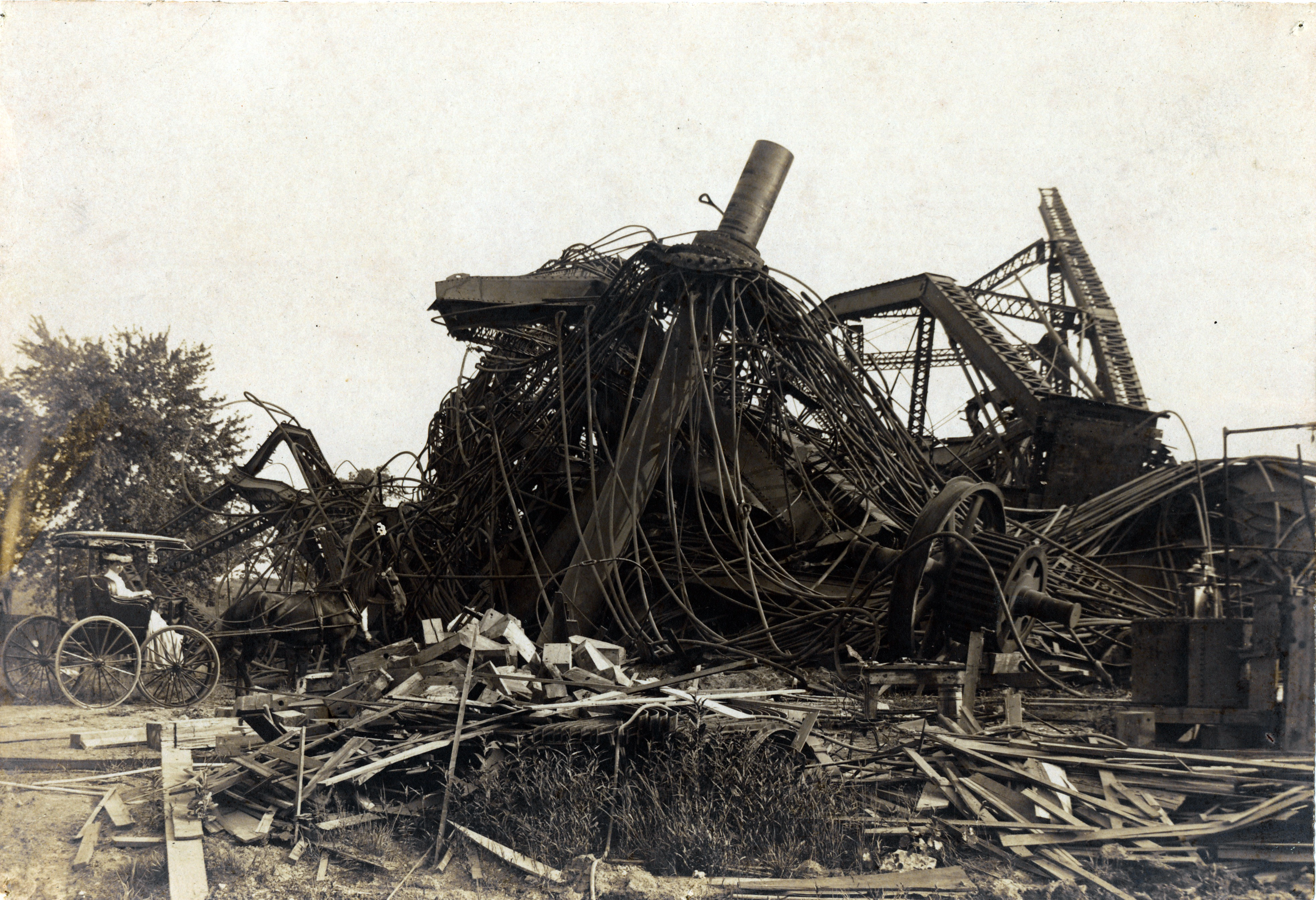
Remains of the Ferris Wheel used at the 1904 World's Fair after demolition

It was then dismantled for a second time and transported by rail to St. Louis for the 1904 World's Fair, where it earned the CHWC about $215,000 (equivalent to $7,704,170 in 2025).

== Demolition and disposition ==
After the 1904 World's Fair closed on December 1, 1904, no purchasers were found who would pay for the relocation of the great Ferris Wheel, despite many efforts. It was finally destroyed by controlled demolition using dynamite on May 11, 1906 (18 months after the fair closed), to be sold for scrap. This was necessary because the contract with the city of St. Louis required the "restoration of Forest Park."

In 2007, a magnetic survey using a cesium magnetometer indicated that a long, steel or iron object (presumed to be the axle) was buried under a major street roughly 200 feet (61 m) from where the wheel was demolished. It has not yet been excavated.

Since 2000, other published documents and research into original papers (from the Chicago House Wrecking Company, c.1904–1906) indicate that the axle was taken back to Chicago, where it was eventually cut up for scrap when oxy-acetylene torches improved sufficiently to cut the hardened steel axle up for scrap. These references include Norman Anderson's book Ferris Wheels: An Illustrated History, several unpublished CHWC letters and documents, an article by Leo Harris (grandson of the CHWC's Treasurer) who wrote that "...the giant axle of the wheel was returned to the yards of the CHWC, where it remained until it was cut up for its steel content at the beginning of World War I", and an article published on February 1, 1907, in the Clinton (IL) Register, indicating, "The last of the Ferris Wheel has been taken away... It was found necessary to blow off the flanges from the axle ... before it could be loaded on a (railroad) car".

== Lasting legacy ==
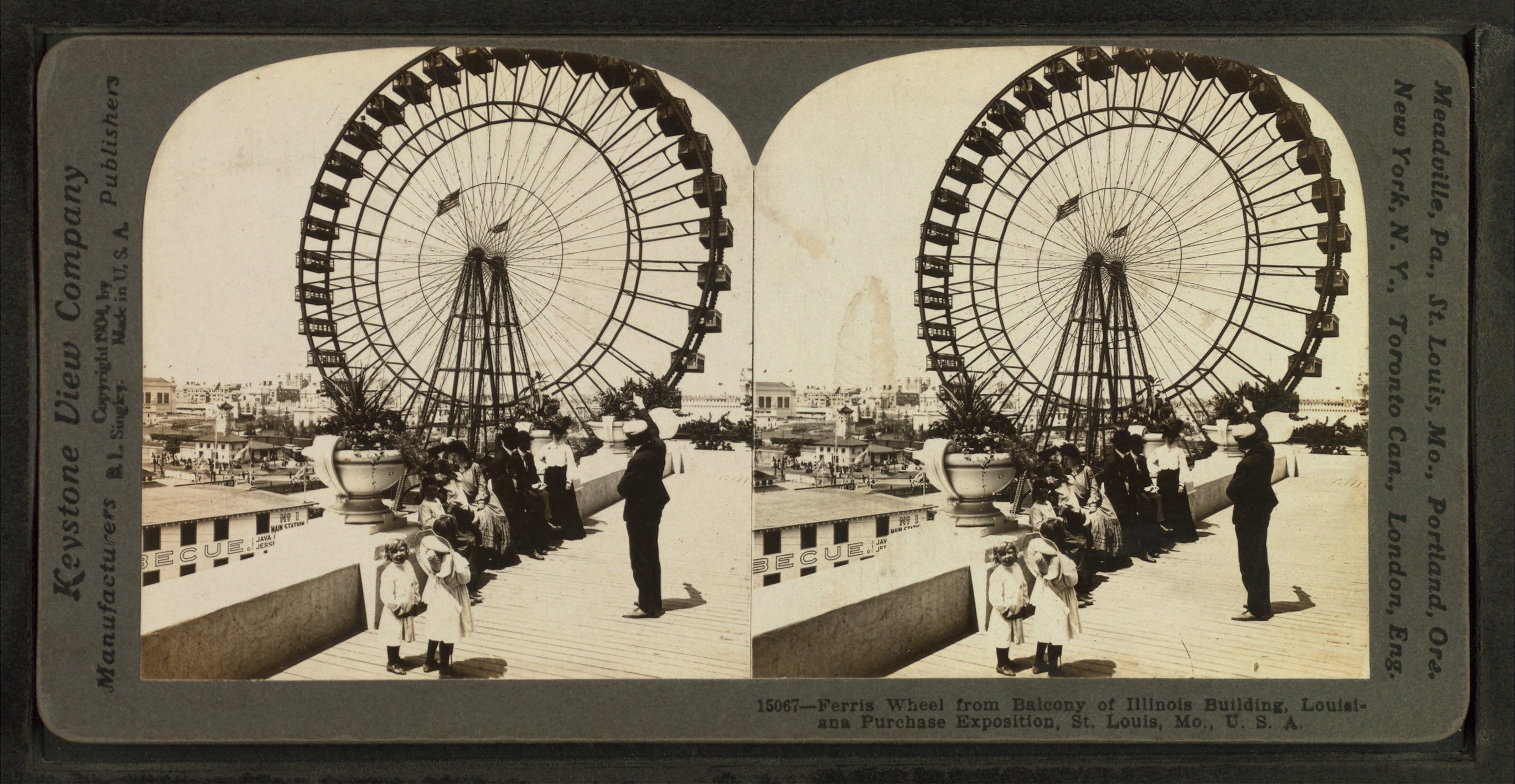
Stereoscopic card showing the Ferris Wheel at the 1904 World's Fair, St. Louis

Although the original Ferris Wheel was demolished, a new wheel lives on in Chicago at Navy Pier, with structural similarities and inspiration from Ferris's original wheel. Similar to the Chicago wheel, this Ferris wheel gives participants a 10- to 20-minute ride in an enclosed car at a similar height to the original.

The original Chicago Navy Pier Ferris Wheel was modelled on the Chicago Ferris Wheel and set on July 1, 1995, with 40 cars fitting six passengers in each one. The now Centennial wheel has enclosed cars at an elevated height closer to the original Chicago Wheel.

== Coordinates ==
- 1893–1894 – Midway Plaisance, Chicago: 41.786817°N 87.5989187°W
- 1895–1903 – Lincoln Park, Chicago: 41.930403°N 87.643492°W
- 1904–1906 – St. Louis: 38.642718°N 90.301051°W

== In popular culture ==
- The characters of the 1944 film Meet Me in St. Louis, attending the 1904 World's Fair, observe the Ferris Wheel and foreshadow its eventual demolition.
- The hero of Robert Lawson's 1957 children's book The Great Wheel is part of the construction crew for the original Chicago Ferris Wheel.
- The back cover of the CD of My Chemical Romance’s 2002 album, I Brought You My Bullets, You Brought Me Your Love, features a distorted image of the Ferris Wheel.
- The 2014 picture book, Mr. Ferris and His Wheel, tells of its creation.
- The 2023 episode "1893", of the series Loki, depicts the wheel in Chicago in a lengthy scene inside one of the carriages.

| Preceded by None | World's tallest Ferris wheel 1893–1894 | Succeeded by Great Wheel |
