= Ferdinand the Bull (film) =

1938 Disney animated short film directed by Dick Rickardo

- Theatrical release poster
- Directed by: Dick Rickard
- Based on: The Story of Ferdinand by: Munro Leaf; Robert Lawson
- Produced by: Walt Disney
- Starring: Milt Kahl
- Narrated by: Don Wilson
- Music by: Albert Hay Malotte
- Color process: Technicolor
- Production company: Walt Disney Productions
- Distributed by: RKO Radio Pictures
- Release date: November 25, 1938
- Running time: 7 minutes, 14 seconds
- Country: United States
- Language: English

Ferdinand the Bull is a 1938 American stand-alone animated short produced by Walt Disney Productions and released on November 25, 1938, by RKO Radio Pictures. It was directed by Dick Rickard and based on the 1936 book The Story of Ferdinand by Munro Leaf. The music was by Albert Hay Malotte, most known for his setting of The Lord's Prayer, commonly sung at weddings.

== Plot ==
The short film starts with many bulls, romping together and butting their heads, but Ferdinand is different; all he wants to do all day is go under a shady cork tree and smell the flowers. One day, his mother notices that he is not playing with the other bulls and asks him why. He responds, "All I want to do is to sit and smell the flowers!" His mother is very understanding.

Ferdinand grows over the years, eventually getting to be the largest and strongest of the group. The other bulls grow up wanting to accomplish one goal in life, to be in the bullfights in Madrid, Spain; but not Ferdinand. One day, five strange-looking men show up to see the bulls. When the bulls notice them, they fight as roughly as possible, hoping to get picked. Ferdinand does not engage and continues to smell the flowers. When he goes to sit, he is unaware there is a bumblebee directly beneath him. The pain of the bee's sting makes him go on a crazed rampage, knock the other bulls out and eventually tear down a tree. The five men, impressed, cheer as they take Ferdinand to Madrid.

There is great excitement when the day of the bullfight comes. On posters, they call him Ferdinand the Fierce. The event starts and out into the ring comes banderilleros, picadors and the matador who is being cheered on. As the matador bows, a woman in the audience throws him a bouquet of flowers which land in his hand. Finally, the moment comes where Ferdinand comes out and he wonders what he is doing there. The banderilleros and picadors are afraid by the sight of Ferdinand and hide, but the matador is scared stiff due to the fact that Ferdinand is so large and strong. Ferdinand looks and sees the bouquet of flowers, walking over and scaring the matador away, but simply starts smelling them. The matador becomes furious at Ferdinand for not charging at him, but Ferdinand is not interested in fighting, only in smelling the flowers. Eventually, he is led out of the arena and taken back home where he continues to sit under the cork tree and smell the flowers.

== Cast ==
- Don Wilson as Narrator
- Walt Disney as Ferdinand's Mother
- Milt Kahl as Ferdinand

== Animators ==
- Milt Kahl
- Hamilton Luske
- Bill Stokes
- John Bradbury
- Bernard Garbutt
- Ward Kimball
- Jack Campbell
- Stan Quackenbush
- Don Lusk

== Reception ==
The short film is broadcast in several countries every year on Christmas Eve as a part of the annual Disney Christmas show From All of Us to All of You. The Christmas show is especially popular in Sweden where it has aired since 1959 and has become a Christmas tradition. The replacement of Ferdinand the Bull with The Ugly Duckling in 1982 resulted in public outcry. The next year, in 1983, the change was reverted and Ferdinand the Bull returned to Swedish television.

Ferdinand the Bull won the 1938 Oscar for Best Short Subject (Cartoons). It won against several other nominated Disney shorts including the Mickey Mouse short Brave Little Tailor, the Donald Duck feature Good Scouts and the Silly Symphonies short, Mother Goose Goes Hollywood.

It is sometimes programmed by orchestras as a piece for a narrator & an orchestra.

== Home media ==
The short was released on December 6, 2005, on Walt Disney Treasures: Disney Rarities - Celebrated Shorts: 1920s–1960s.

Other home video releases include:

1. Walt Disney Cartoon Classics Limited Gold Edition II: How the Best Was Won (1933–1960) (VHS/Betamax/Laserdisc), 1985
2. Walt Disney Mini-Classics: Willie the Operatic Whale (VHS), 1991
3. Walt Disney's Timeless Tales Volume 2: The Ugly Duckling/Wind in the Willows/The Country Cousin (DVD), 2005
4. Walt Disney Animation Collection: Classic Short Films Volume 6: The Reluctant Dragon (DVD), 2009

It is also available on the streaming service Disney+.
