= Mr. Popper's Penguins =

1938 children's book

- Mr. Popper's Penguins book cover (1988 ed.)
- Author: Richard and Florence Atwater
- Illustrator: Robert Lawson
- Language: English
- Genre: Children's novel
- Publisher: Little, Brown Young Readers
- Publication date: 1938
- Publication place: United States
- Media type: Print (Hardback, Paperback) & AudioBook (Cassette)
- Pages: 139
- ISBN: 0-316-05842-4
- OCLC: 17265673
- LC Class: PZ7.A892 Mr 1988

Mr. Popper's Penguins is a children's book written by Richard and Florence Atwater, with illustrations by Robert Lawson, originally published in 1938. It tells the story of a poor house painter named Mr. Popper and his family, who live in the small town of Stillwater in the 1930s. The Poppers unexpectedly come into possession of a penguin, Captain Cook. The Poppers then receive a female penguin from the zoo, who mates with Captain Cook to have 10 baby penguins. Before long, something must be done, lest the penguins eat the Poppers out of house and home.

== Plot ==
Mr. Popper is a house painter of modest means, living with his wife and two children (Bill and Janie) in the small town of Stillwater, Minnesota. He has a happy life. However, he is also a restless dreamer, spending his time reading of famous explorers in faraway places.

One day, the Popper family tunes in to a radio broadcast by an admiral exploring polar regions. Mr. Popper had previously sent the admiral fan mail, and the admiral promises Mr. Popper a surprise. The surprise turns out to be a penguin, which comes in a large box. Mr. Popper names the penguin "Captain Cook" after the famous James Cook. Mr. Popper cleans out the icebox so that the penguin can sleep inside. As time goes by, the Poppers find that Captain Cook is growing larger, but his health is failing. Mr. Popper writes to the curator of a large aquarium, asking for help. The curator replies that the aquarium has a female penguin who is experiencing the same symptoms, and he suggests that perhaps the penguins are simply lonely. Soon after, the Poppers receive their second penguin in the mail.

Mr. Popper names the second penguin Greta and the pair of penguins are revitalized by each other's presence. As both birds cannot fit into the icebox together, Mr. Popper opens the window to let in the cold winter air, creating a snow-covered habitat. As this solution will not work in springtime, Mr. Popper has the main things moved upstairs and a freezing plant installed in the basement for the birds. This makes for happy penguins, but strains the family budget.

As time passes, Greta lays eggs. She continues laying a new egg every three days until the total reaches ten. As penguins do not normally lay so many eggs, Mr. Popper attributes this to the change in climate the birds have experienced. When the eggs hatch, the Popper family now has twelve penguins to feed, and the contractor is looking for payment on the household changes.

Mr. Popper decides to raise money by training the twelve penguins and turning them into a circus act. The act debuts at the local theater, and soon the "Popper's Performing Penguins" are featured throughout the country. But in the theater in New York City, the penguins cause trouble; what's worse, they have inadvertently shown up at the wrong theater. The frustrated manager of that theater has Mr. Popper arrested, along with the penguins.

Admiral Drake, having arrived to see Popper's Performing Penguins for himself, posts bail for Mr. Popper. After speaking with the admiral, Mr. Popper decides that show business is no life for a penguin. Drake lets all of the twelve penguins go with him on his expedition to the North Pole, where they will be released experimentally into the arctic. The Poppers are sad to see the penguins go, especially Mr. Popper himself—that is, until Admiral Drake invites Mr. Popper to accompany him on the trip. The Poppers wave goodbye as Mr. Popper and his penguins sail away towards the North Pole and Mr. Popper promises to be back in a year or two.

== Publication history ==
- 1938, U.S., Little, Brown and Company OCLC 11447859
- 1988, U.S., Little, Brown and Co. ISBN 978-0-316-05842-1
- 1993, U.S., Little, Brown ISBN 978-0-316-05844-5, pop-up
- 2000, U.S., Prince Frederick ISBN 978-0-7887-2724-5, cassette

== Reception ==
Mr. Popper's Penguins has received generally positive reviews. Common Sense Media wrote: "Vivid imagery, clever word plays, and funny characters that border on the absurd have made this book a popular choice for kids in classrooms and at home." Kirkus Reviews, on the other hand, stated in 1938: "This is rather a silly story, and I don't believe children will think it particularly funny."

Publishers Weekly said of a pop-up version: "Aside from the alliterative appeal of a pop-up Mr. Popper, it's hard to see how the children's classic benefits from this particular format", and, "Stick with the real thing."

== Awards ==
Mr. Popper's Penguins was named a Newbery Honor Book in 1939 and won the 1940 Young Reader's Choice Award. It was one of the inaugural 1958 Lewis Carroll Shelf Award books.

== Film adaptation ==
A 20th Century Fox film based loosely on the book was released on June 17, 2011, and starred Jim Carrey as Mr. Popper. It was originally going to be made by Walt Disney Pictures ten years beforehand as an animated feature film.

== Sequel ==
In 2020, Little, Brown commissioned children's book author Eliot Schrefer to write a sequel, entitled Popper Penguin Rescue. The book describes new penguin adventures of descendants of the Poppers.
