= The Great Wheel =

Book by Robert Lawson

- First Edition Cover
- Author: Robert Lawson
- Language: English
- Genre: Children's literature
- Publisher: Viking Juvenile
- Publication date: August 19, 1957
- Publication place: United States
- Media type: Print (hardcover)
- Pages: 188
- ISBN: 978-0-670-35102-2

The Great Wheel is Robert Lawson's final children's book, published in 1957, the year of his death. It was posthumously named as a Newbery Honor book in 1958.

== Plot summary ==
The story's protagonist is Irish-born Conn Kilroy, who leaves Ireland for the United States in the 1890s at the urging of his Uncle Michael. Before he leaves, his aunt predicts that he will ride the biggest wheel in the world. He travels to the United States by steamship. While on board, he meets an attractive German girl named Trudy, who is traveling to Wisconsin.

Upon his arrival, he begins working for his uncle in New York City, but he is soon hired to work for the company commissioned to create the huge Ferris Wheel for the 1893 World's Columbian Exposition. He works hard with his newfound friend Martin Brennan to build it. After the giant wheel is installed at the exposition, Conn fulfills his aunt's prophecy by riding on it. His uncle would like him to help build a bridge, but Conn refuses and stays. He takes a job as a guard at the fair, hoping that someday Trudy will visit the fair. She does visit, and the two reunite, eventually marrying and moving to Wisconsin.
