= Wee Gillis =

1938 Picture book

- Author: Munro Leaf
- Illustrator: Robert Lawson
- Publisher: Viking Press
- Publication date: 1938
- Pages: unpaged
- Awards: Caldecott Honor

Wee Gillis is a 1938 picture book by Munro Leaf and illustrated by Robert Lawson. The story is about Wee Gillis who divides his time between family in Scotland's highlands and lowlands and what happens when each wants him to choose their customs over the other. The book was a recipient of a 1939 Caldecott Honor for its illustrations.
