= Mark Fish (composer) =

Mark Fish is a San Francisco Bay Area composer who has had works performed in venues including Carnegie Hall. His most successful work has been Ferdinand the Bull, which exists as both a chamber work and an orchestral work, and has been narrated in concert by David Ogden Stiers, Emmy Award-winner Roscoe Lee Browne, and Lauren Lane. It is a musical setting of the children's classic The Story of Ferdinand, and has been recorded for the CD Ferdinand the Bull and Friends (North Pacific Music), with Stiers narrating on the recording. His Pictures of Miró, performed in the United States, New Zealand, and South Africa, is a set of musical depictions of 11 works by the Catalan painter Joan Miró, which has been recorded by Tessa Brinckman and the East West Continuo for the album Glass Sky.

Fish's piece Twilight, a work for strings, premiered in 2006 at Stanford's Dinkelspiel Auditorium.
