= Ben and Me =

1953 Disney short film directed by Hamilton Luske

- 1989 VHS artwork
- Directed by: Hamilton Luske
- Story by: Robert Lawson (novel); Bill Peet (screen story); Winston Hibler; Del Connell; Ted Sears (adaptation)
- Produced by: Walt Disney
- Starring: Sterling Holloway; Charlie Ruggles; Stan Freberg; Hans Conried; Bill Thompson; Jimmy MacDonald
- Narrated by: Sterling Holloway
- Music by: Oliver Wallace
- Animation by: Wolfgang Reitherman; John Lounsbery; Cliff Nordberg; Marvin Woodward; Hugh Fraser; Eric Cleworth; Ollie Johnston; Hal King; Les Clark; Don Lusk; Harvey Toombs; Jerry Hathcook; George Rowley (effects)
- Layouts by: Al Zinnen; Hugh Hennesy; Thor Putnam
- Backgrounds by: Al Dempster; Thelma Witmer; Dick Anthony
- Production company: Walt Disney Productions
- Distributed by: Buena Vista Film Distribution
- Release date: November 10, 1953
- Running time: 21 minutes
- Country: United States
- Language: English

Ben and Me is an American animated two-reel short subject produced by Walt Disney Productions and released theatrically on November 10, 1953. It was adapted from the book of the same name written by author/illustrator Robert Lawson, which was first published in 1939. Although both book and film deal with the relationship between a mouse and American Founding Father Benjamin Franklin, the book, with illustrations by Lawson, focused more heavily on actual historical events and personages, and included incidents from Franklin's French career at Versailles.

The short received an Academy Award nomination for Best Short Subject, Two-reel.

This short was also notable for being the second release on the Buena Vista Distribution label, with the first being Toot, Whistle, Plunk and Boom, released on the same day. On its release, Ben and Me was packaged with the feature-length True-Life Adventures nature documentary film The Living Desert. When Disney's regular distributor RKO Radio Pictures resisted Disney's idea of releasing a feature-length True-Life Adventures nature documentary film, Disney formed his own distribution company to handle future Disney releases. When aired on television as part of a Disneyland episode titled The Liberty Story, a prologue detailing Amos's family history was added to the film.

A D-TV music video was developed in which the short was set to Stevie Wonder's For Once in My Life.

== Plot ==
At the statue of Benjamin Franklin, a tour group leader is discussing to a group of children Franklin's lasting impact in American history. At the same time on the Franklin statue's head, the leader of a tour group of young mice reveals the contributions of a mouse named Amos (also immortalized as a statue on Franklin's hat) to Franklin's career, reading from Amos' diary, entitled Ben and Me. After describing the exploits of some of his ancestors, which includes one sailing on the Mayflower to arrive in America, Amos tells his own story.

The eldest of 26 siblings living in the Christ Church, Philadelphia, Amos sets out on his own in 1745 to find some work and help his large family. Having no such luck, he takes shelter in Ben's shop from the bitter cold and snow and befriends the beleaguered printer, who is in grave danger of having his press and everything he owns repossessed by bill collectors. Amos invents bifocals for Ben from his two broken pairs of glasses; he also inspires him to create the Franklin stove. Amos also helps Ben turn his dry publication, Poor Richard's Almanack, into a successful newspaper, the Pennsylvania Gazette; Amos acts as journalist to gather good stories and then helps Ben operate the printing press. As the years pass, Amos helps Ben advance socially and build his reputation.

However, Ben makes Amos an unwitting test subject in his experiments with electricity (which he promises to never do to Amos again, though he double-crosses), culminating in him sending the mouse into the air as part of his kite experiment. Amos is nearly killed when the kite is struck by lightning and crashes to the ground. Furious, he leaves Ben and moves back in with his family.

Years later, the early stages of the revolution take place. Ben travels to England to try to make reason with the king and persuade an end to the taxes, but this turns out to be a failure. When Amos sees Ben returning in despondency, one part of him has pity and wants to help, while the other part still unforgiving. In 1776, Ben finds Amos' hole at the church and begs him for his help. Amos agrees on the condition that Ben sign a contract agreeing to his terms. As Ben is reading the contract, Thomas Jefferson comes by, struggling with writing the introduction to the United States Declaration of Independence. The language in Amos' contract inspires Jefferson, and it becomes the Declaration's introduction. Amos accompanies Ben to the signing of the Declaration. The short ends with both tour groups stating how both man and mouse were truly great figures in American history.

== Voice cast ==
- Sterling Holloway as Amos Mouse
- Jimmy MacDonald as Gus
- Charlie Ruggles as Benjamin Franklin
- Lucille Bliss as Anastasia Tremaine
- June Foray as Lucifer
- Stan Freberg as mouse guide
- Bill Thompson as Governor Keith, and as the human tour guide
- Hans Conried as Thomas Jefferson, and as a criminal
- Jimmy MacDonald as miscellaneous men

== Home media ==
The short was released on December 6, 2005, on Walt Disney Treasures: Disney Rarities - Celebrated Shorts: 1920s–1960s.

Additional releases include:

- On VHS under the Walt Disney Mini-Classics label on May 9, 1989.
- On DVD under the Disney Generations Collection in 2012.
