= Abraham Lincoln (Parin d'Aulaire book) =

1939 picture book by Ingri and Edgar Parin d'Aulaire

- Author: Ingri and Edgar Parin d'Aulaire
- Illustrator: Ingri and Edgar Parin d'Aulaire
- Genre: Children's picture book
- Publisher: Doubleday; Beautiful Feet Books, Inc.(2015)
- Publication date: 1939
- Publication place: United States
- Pages: 64
- ISBN: 9781893103603

Abraham Lincoln is a biography written and illustrated by Ingri and Edgar Parin d'Aulaire about Abraham Lincoln. Originally published by Doubleday, it was the recipient of the Caldecott Medal for illustration in 1940.

== Plot ==
Abraham Lincoln story is based on the life of the 16th President of the United States, focusing on his early years and the road he took to manhood.

== Production and reprinting ==
Ingri and Edgar Parin d'Aulaire often explored the environment of their historical subjects and, for Abraham Lincoln, they spent time camping and sketching in Kentucky and Illinois to capture the feel of Lincoln's roots.

The original celebrated artwork was created by stone lithography. By 1957, this was a cumbersome printing process and the d'Aulaire's were asked by their publisher, Doubleday, to reproduce their artwork on acetate for later editions of the book.

For the 75th anniversary of the book's Caldecott recognition, Beautiful Feet Books published a new edition of the book in 2015. Scanning original proofs from a 1939 edition of Abraham Lincoln kept at Yale University, the publishers wished to recapture the richness and subtlety of the original illustrations. Other minor changes were made to the original artwork and text to reflect historical accuracy and contemporary sensibilities to race and culture. The 2015 reprint was featured in Publishers Weekly on December 1, 2015.

Awards
Preceded by Mei Li	Caldecott Medal recipient 1940	Succeeded by They Were Strong and Good
