= Rabbit Hill =

1945 American children's novel by Robert Lawson

- Book cover
- Author: Robert Lawson
- Illustrator: Robert Lawson
- Language: English
- Genre: Children's novel
- Publisher: The Viking Press
- Publication date: 1944
- Publication place: United States
- Media type: Hardcover, paperback
- Pages: 127
- Followed by: The Tough Winter

Rabbit Hill is a children's novel by Robert Lawson that won the Newbery Medal for excellence in American children's literature in 1945. In 1954 he wrote a sequel, The Tough Winter.

== Plot introduction ==
The story takes place in the countryside near Westport, Connecticut. The animal inhabitants are suffering as the house nearby has been abandoned for several years and the untended garden, the animals' source of food, has withered to nothing. "New Folks" then move into the house: Are they hunters, or friendly gardeners who will provide for the animals?

== Literary significance and criticism ==
The book was written at the end of World War II when racial integration and providing aid to the war-torn countries of Europe were on everyone's minds. The moral intent becomes clear when reading the story with those in mind. Suspicion, fear, and hate—personified in the elderly rabbit Uncle Analdas, and led by him when Georgie was injured and taken into the House—leads to the ravaging of the House's garden and grounds by his family and their friends.

In a short while, Georgie is released—healed—and can tell and show his family and friends that the New People have no intention of hurting them, and have made a place where they may all always find food and water, overseen by a statue of Saint Francis and the inscription "There Is Enough for All".

Printings of the book beginning in the 1970s and continuing today have edited the character Sulphronia, the new occupants' cook. This was done because she was originally depicted as an African American stereotype.

== Film and television ==
Little Georgie of Rabbit Hill was a 1967 television adaptation for NBC Children's Theatre.

== See also ==
Awards
Preceded by Johnny Tremain	Newbery Medal recipient 1945	Succeeded by Strawberry Girl
