= They Were Strong and Good =

1940 children's nonfiction book by Robert Lawson

- First edition
- Author: Robert Lawson
- Language: English
- Publisher: Viking Press
- Publication date: 1940
- Publication place: United States
- ISBN: 978-0-670-69949-0
- OCLC: 302147

They Were Strong and Good is a children's nonfiction book written and illustrated by Robert Lawson, who won the 1941 Caldecott Medal for excellence in illustration of an American children's picture book. It tells the story of Lawson's family: where they came from, how they met, what they did, and where they lived. "None of them," Lawson says in the preface, speaking of his ancestors, "were great or famous, but they were strong and good."

== Controversy ==
The original 1940 text was revised to alter two controversial sections. One refers to American Indians as "tame", while in the other, "colored boy" is replaced with "Negro slave". The accompanying pictures remain unchanged across versions.

1940 original:

When my mother was a little girl there were Indians in Minnesota—tame ones. My mother did not like them. They would stalk into the kitchen without knocking and sit on the floor. Then they would rub their stomachs and point to their mouths to show that they were hungry. They would not leave until my mother’s mother gave them something to eat.

Revised edition:

When my mother was a little girl there were Indians in Minnesota. My mother did not like them. They would stalk into the kitchen without knocking and sit on the floor. Then they would rub their stomachs and point to their mouths to show that they were hungry. They would not leave until my mother’s mother gave them something to eat.

This illustration is of a Black woman—a bandanna-wearing "mammy"—brandishing a broom at two Indians who are running away with stolen food.

1940 original:

When my father was very young he had two dogs and a colored boy. The dogs were named Sextus Hostilius and Numa Pompilius. The colored boy was just my father's age. He was a slave, but they didn't call him that. They just called him Dick. He and my father and the two hound dogs used to hunt all day long.

Revised edition:

When my father was very young he had a Negro slave and two dogs. The dogs were named Sextus Hostilius and Numa Pompilius. The Negro boy was just my father's age and his name was Dick. He and my father and the two hound dogs used to hunt all day long.

This illustration is of a Black youngster dressed in rags, carrying two dead animals, walking behind his young white master. Several other illustrations also show Black people dressed in rags, in various positions of servitude.

== See also ==
Awards
Preceded by Abraham Lincoln	Caldecott Medal recipient 1941	Succeeded by Make Way for Ducklings
