= Ben and Me (book) =

Novel by Robert Lawson

- Author: Robert Lawson
- Illustrator: Robert Lawson
- Cover artist: Robert Lawson
- Language: English
- Publisher: Little, Brown
- Publication date: 1939
- Publication place: United States
- Pages: 114
- ISBN: 978-0-316-51730-0

Ben and Me (subtitled An Astonishing Life of Benjamin Franklin by His Good Mouse Amos) is a novel by the American writer and artist Robert Lawson, published in 1939 by Little, Brown and Company.

The story is about a mouse, Amos, who becomes the advisor to Benjamin Franklin, hiding in his fur cap to secretly whisper advice in his ear. The book humorously recounts the invention of the Franklin stove, Franklin's kite experiment and invention of lightning rods, and his service as ambassador to France. It is illustrated in pen-and-ink by Lawson.

In 1953, the book was adapted by Walt Disney Productions into a short film of the same name. The film only covers a few of the time periods that were shown in the book, whose timeline is closer to actual history.

== Plot ==
The story begins with Amos, a young mouse from a large family, setting out to find work to support his siblings. After several unsuccessful attempts, he finds refuge in the print shop of Benjamin Franklin, who is struggling financially.

Amos, observing Franklin's difficulties, begins to offer subtle advice. He suggests the idea for the Franklin stove to improve heating efficiency, helps Franklin create a successful newspaper, and even contributes to the invention of bifocal glasses.

As Franklin's fame grows, Amos becomes increasingly involved in his life. Their partnership takes a dangerous turn, however, when Franklin conducts his famous kite experiment to prove that lightning is electricity. Amos, unknowingly attached to the kite string, receives a severe shock.

Furious and traumatized, Amos leaves Franklin and returns to his family. Years later, as the American Revolution begins, Franklin, facing challenges in his diplomatic mission to France, desperately seeks Amos' help.

Amos agrees to return, but only after Franklin signs a contract outlining his terms. While Franklin is reading the contract, Thomas Jefferson arrives, struggling to write the opening lines of the Declaration of Independence. Inspired by the language of Amos' contract, Jefferson incorporates similar phrasing into the Declaration.

Amos helps Franklin throughout his seven years as Minister to France. As they depart, Amos helps command a small army in the "Battle of Versailles", a loose analog of the French Revolution fought by different classes of mice. This somewhat tarnishes Ben's reputation among the French intelligentsia.

It ends with an illustration of Amos sitting on Franklin's tombstone.
