= Four and Twenty Blackbirds (picture book) =

- Author: Helen Dean Fish
- Illustrator: Robert Lawson
- Publisher: Lippincott Williams & Wilkins
- Publication date: June 1, 1937
- Pages: unpaged
- Awards: Caldecott Honor
- ISBN: 0397315465

Four and Twenty Blackbirds is a 1937 picture book of nursery rhymes collected by Helen Dean Fish and illustrated by Robert Lawson. The book is a collection of nursery rhymes which were considered older when it was published. The book was a recipient of a 1938 Caldecott Honor for its illustrations.
