= Richard and Florence Atwater =

Authors

Richard and Florence Atwater co-authored the book Mr. Popper's Penguins, which won the 1939 Newbery Honor Award.

== Florence ==
Florence Atwater
- Born: Florence Hasseltine Carroll; September 13, 1896; Chicago, Illinois, U.S.
- Died: August 23, 1979 (aged 82); Chicago
- Spouse: Richard Atwater (1921–1948; his death)

Florence Hasseltine Atwater (née Carroll; September 13, 1896 – August 23, 1979) was born in Chicago, the last child of Mary Josephine ("Minnie") Delany, a former concert pianist with the Philadelphia Conservatory, and James Carroll, a Philadelphia publisher. As Florence Carroll, she obtained her AB and MA in French literature at the University of Chicago (1920) where she was co-editor of The Chicago Literary Monthly, and student of Richard Atwater. They married in 1921 and had two children, Doris (1922–2000) and Carroll (1925–2013).

After her husband's stroke in 1934, Florence Atwater started teaching high school French, English and Latin, and wrote short pieces for The New Yorker, Woman's Home Companion and The Atlantic. She submitted her husband's original version of Mr. Popper's Penguins to two different publishers but it met with no success. She rewrote parts of the book and the revised version was accepted by Little Brown and published in 1938 to great success. Mr. Popper's Penguins won the Newbery Honor Award in 1939 and the Lewis Carroll Shelf Award in 1958. It has been translated into many languages, and has never been out of print. In the summer of 2011, a movie of the same name was released.

== Richard ==
Richard Atwater
- Born: Richard Tupper Atwater; December 29, 1892; Chicago, Illinois, U.S.
- Died: August 21, 1948 (aged 55); Chicago
- Spouse: Florence Atwater (1921–1948)

Richard Tupper Atwater (December 29, 1892 – August 21, 1948) was a Chicago writer and classics professor at the University of Chicago. He is probably best known as the co-author, with his wife Florence, of the book Mr. Popper's Penguins. He contributed to the literary and arts magazine The Chicagoan and wrote for a number of newspapers, including the Chicago Evening Post, the Chicago Daily News, the Chicago Tribune, and the Herald-Examiner. He also taught Classical Greek at the University of Chicago.

Atwater translated into English Procopius' Secret History, a 6th century story of Emperor Justinian and Empress Theodora. It was published in a limited edition of 760 copies by Pascal Covici in 1927 and reprinted by University of Michigan Press in 1961.

Richard Atwater's other publications include Rickety Rhymes of Riq, a book of poetry published in 1925; Doris and the Trolls, a children's book published in 1931; and The King's Sneezes, A Children's Operetta with music by Jessie Thomas, in 1933.

Richard Atwater suffered a stroke in 1934 which left him unable to speak or write. He had finished a manuscript of a book he called "Ork! The Story of Mr. Popper's Penguins", inspired by a documentary about Richard E. Byrd's Antarctic expedition that he had seen with his family in 1932. His wife Florence revised the book after he became disabled, and Mr. Popper's Penguins went on to become a children's classic

== Sources ==
- Bishop, Carroll Atwater & Katherine Elizabeth. Family history materials.
