= The Story of Ferdinand =

1936 American children's picture book

- Author: Munro Leaf
- Cover artist: Robert Lawson
- Language: English
- Genre: Children's literature
- Publisher: Viking Press
- Publication date: 1936
- Publication place: United States
- Media type: Print (hardcover and paperback)

The Story of Ferdinand (1936) is the best-known work by the American author Munro Leaf. Illustrated by Robert Lawson, the children's book tells the story of a bull who would rather smell flowers than fight in bullfights. He sits in the middle of the bull ring failing to take heed of any of the provocations of the matador and others to fight. The Story of Ferdinand was published in 1936 by Viking Books. Later, after the Spanish Civil War, it was viewed as having a political agenda. During World War II, the British Air Transport Auxiliary started flying into Europe after D-Day and their pilots, who were non-combatants, used Ferdinand the Bull as their call sign. The book has been adapted into two films, the 1938 animated short Ferdinand the Bull and the 2017 animated feature film Ferdinand. The latter was nominated for Best Animated Feature at the 90th Academy Awards.

== Plot ==
Young Ferdinand does not enjoy butting heads with other young bulls, preferring instead to sit under a cork tree smelling flowers. His mother is concerned that he might be lonely and tries to persuade him to play with the other calves, but when she sees that Ferdinand is content as he is, she leaves him alone.

Ferdinand grows to be the biggest bull in the herd and he often spends time alone. All the other bulls dream of being chosen to compete in the bullfights in Madrid, but Ferdinand still prefers smelling the flowers instead. One day, five men come to the pasture to choose a fighting bull. Ferdinand is again on his own, sniffing flowers, when he accidentally sits on a bumblebee. Upon getting stung as a result, he runs wildly across the field, snorting and stamping. Mistaking Ferdinand for a mad and aggressive bull, the men dub him "Ferdinand the Fierce" and take him away to Madrid.

All of Madrid, including many women, turn out to see the handsome matador fight "Ferdinand the Fierce". When Ferdinand enters the bull ring, he is faced with the matador, banderilleros and picadors who panic when they see him. However, he is delighted by the flowers in the women's hair and sits down in the middle of the ring to smell them, upsetting and disappointing everyone and making the matador and other fighters throw tantrums. Ferdinand is then taken back to his pasture, where at the end he is still sitting under the cork tree happily smelling flowers.

== Publication ==
The book's first run by Viking Press in 1936 sold 14,000 copies at a dollar each. The following year saw sales increase to 68,000 by 1938, the book was selling at 3,000 per week. (Note: An article from 1986 suggests even lower initial sales, with an initial print run of just 5,200 copies, and low sales until after late December 1936.) That year, it outsold Gone with the Wind to become the number one best seller in the United States.

As of 2019 the book has never been out of print. The book has been translated into more than sixty languages. In 1962, a Latin translation, Ferdinandus Taurus, was published by David McKay Publications in New York and by Hamish Hamilton in London.

A first-edition copy sold at auction for $16,500 in 2014.

== Reception ==
In 1938, Life magazine called Ferdinand "the greatest juvenile classic since Winnie the Pooh" and suggested that "three out of four grownups buy the book largely for their own pleasure and amusement". The article also noted that Ferdinand was accused of being a political symbol, noting that "too-subtle readers see in Ferdinand everything from a fascist to a pacifist to a burlesque sit-down striker". Others labelled the work "as promoting fascism, anarchism, and communism". The Cleveland Plain Dealer "accused the book of corrupting the youth of America" while The New York Times downplayed the possible political allegories, insisting the book was about being true to oneself.

The book was released less than two months after the outbreak of the Spanish Civil War, and was seen by many supporters of Francisco Franco as a pacifist book. It was banned in many countries, including in Spain (where it remained banned until after Franco's death). In Nazi Germany, Adolf Hitler ordered the book burned (as "degenerate democratic propaganda"), while it was the only American children's book available for sale in Cold War era Poland. It received particular praise from Thomas Mann, H. G. Wells, Gandhi, and Franklin and Eleanor Roosevelt. Following the 1945 defeat of Germany during the Second World War, 30,000 copies were quickly published and given out for free to the country's children.

In the United States, the book was so popular with the public in the 1930s that it was used in various commercial products, from toys to Post Toasties breakfast cereal. Disney made it into an animated short in 1938, which became a classic (winning the Academy Award for Best Animated Short Film) and was the basis for Ferdinand the Bull, based on 'The Story of Ferdinand' by Munro Leaf and Robert Lawson (Whitman Publishing Co., 1938), Walt Disney's Ferdinand and the Robbers (Random House, 1983) by Vincent H. Jefferds and Walt Disney's Ferdinand and the Bullies (Bantam Books, 1986, ISBN 978-0553055900).

In 1951, Holiday magazine published an Ernest Hemingway children's story called "The Faithful Bull". This story has been interpreted as a "rebuttal" to the earlier Leaf book.

According to one scholar, the book crosses gender lines in that it offers a character to whom both boys and girls can relate. More recently, in 2011 The New York Times positioned the story in the context of discrimination and social exclusion. It characterized the story as "an icon for the outsider and the bullied".

== Background ==
Leaf is said to have written the story on a whim in an afternoon in 1935, largely to provide his friend, illustrator Robert Lawson (then relatively unknown) a forum in which to showcase his talents.

The landscape in which Lawson placed the fictional Ferdinand is more or less real. Lawson faithfully reproduced the view of the city of Ronda in Andalusia for his illustration of Ferdinand being brought to Madrid on a cart: we see the Puente Nuevo ("New Bridge") spanning the El Tajo canyon. The Disney film added some rather accurate views of Ronda and the Puente Romano ("Roman bridge") and the Puente Viejo ("Old bridge") at the beginning of the story, where Lawson's pictures were more free. Ronda is home to the oldest bullfighting ring in Spain that is still used; this might have been a reason for Lawson's use of its surroundings as a background for the story. Although most of the illustrations are realistic, Lawson added touches of whimsy by adding, for instance, bunches of corks, as though plucked from a bottle, growing on the cork tree like fruit.

According to a documentary from Sweden (where the Disney film is shown every year on Christmas Eve) the story has a basis in truth. A peaceful bull named Civilón was raised on a farm outside Salamanca in the early 1930s, and the Spanish press campaigned for it to not have to meet its fate in the bull-fighting arena. It was pardoned mid-fight, but when the Spanish Civil War broke out days later, it never lived to see its home.

== Legacy ==
"Ferdinand" was the code name chosen for the Australian Coastwatchers in World War II by Eric Feldt, the organization's commander:

Ferdinand ... did not fight but sat under a tree and just smelled the flowers. It was meant as a reminder to coastwatchers that it was not their duty to fight and so draw attention to themselves, but to sit circumspectly and unobtrusively, gathering information. Of course, like their titular prototype, they could fight if they were stung.

In 1938, the book became a bestseller and an animated short was created, winning the Academy Award for Best Short Subject. Eighty years later, a full-length movie was released by 20th Century Fox.

=== References in other works ===
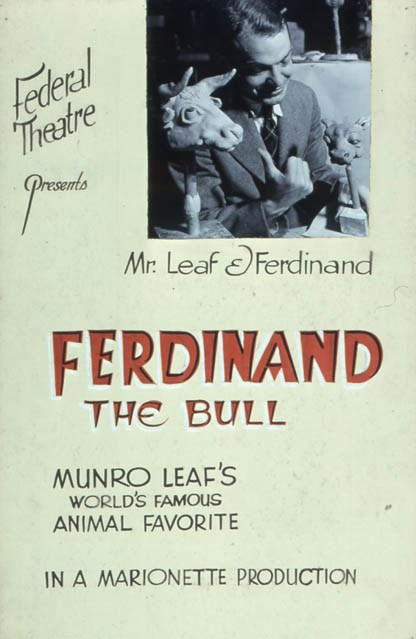
Poster from the Federal Theatre Project, Work Projects Administration production, 1937.

- Marvel Comics featured a recurring character named Rintrah in the pages of Doctor Strange. This extraterrestrial anthropomorphic bull was frequently referred to as Ferdinand for his gentle and kind nature.
- In the DC Comics, the name Ferdinand is used for a Minotaur chef at the Themysciran embassy in New York City. Ferdinand also makes an appearance in the animated film Wonder Woman: Bloodlines.
- Illustrator Betty Fraser used a picture of a child reading the book of Ferdinand, along with a bull smelling some flowers, in the 1978 book A House Is a House for Me, authored by Mary Ann Hoberman.
- A rubber mask of Ferdinand is featured in Stephen King's 1995 novel Rose Madder.
- A non-player character (NPC) named Ferdinand in the computer game World of Warcraft can be found in the continent of Pandaria, in the zone of the Jade Forest. He is a yaungol (an oxen-like race) who sits in a garden filled with flowers and trees, with a bouquet of flowers in each hand. He is classed as a rare mob and drops rare level loot as well as a chance to drop an epic weapon when killed. Unlike most other rare mobs, he is one of the few who are not marked as hostile and will only fight back if attacked.
- The Palladium Books role-playing game Teenage Mutant Ninja Turtles & Other Strangeness features a mutant bull terrorist named "Ferd", which is short for "Ferdinand".
- The book was also featured in an episode of Kino's Storytime.

==== Film ====
- A plushie of Ferdinand plays a significant role in the 1940 film Dance, Girl, Dance. The toy is passed between various characters, having been originally purchased as a memento of a visit to a nightclub called Ferdinand's. The nightclub has a large statue of Ferdinand at the rear of the bandstand.
- Ferdinand the Bull was the favorite book of the main character in the 1997 film Strays, a Sundance favorite written/directed/starring a then-unknown Vin Diesel.
- Ferdinand is referenced by the 2009 film The Blind Side, the story of Michael Oher. The movie includes a scene where the character played by Sandra Bullock reads "Ferdinand the Bull" to two adolescents.

==== Music ====
- The story was set to incidental music in Ferdinand the Bull by classical composer Mark Fish. This piece has been narrated in concerts by actors including David Ogden Stiers, Lauren Lane, and Emmy award-winner Roscoe Lee Browne. Fish and Stiers have co-produced a recording of a reduced version of the piece for narrator, cello, and piano, also narrated by Stiers, and recorded by northwest composer Jack Gabel and released by North Pacific Music.
- The book was adapted, in 1971, as Ferdinand, a piece for solo violin and narrator by the British composer Alan Ridout.
- Singer-songwriter Elliott Smith had a tattoo of Ferdinand the Bull, from the cover of Munro Leaf's book, on his right upper arm, which is visible on the cover of his record Either/Or.
- The rock band Fall Out Boy named their second studio album From Under the Cork Tree after a phrase in the book.

== Audio adaptations ==
In 1951, Capitol Records released Walt Disney's Ferdinand the Bull (CAS 3095), adapted from the book by Alan Livingston with music by Billy May and narrated by Don Wilson, as a 10" 78 RPM album. This recording was later released by Capitol in LP format in 1961 as part of The Sorcerer's Apprentice from Walt Disney's Fantasia (J-3253); the album was re-released in 1972 by Wonderland Records (L-8110).

The story was released as an audio recording in 1967 by Scholastic Records (CC 0606) as a 7" 33-1/3 RPM LP. The story was narrated by former professional boxing champion Juan Nazario with music composed, arranged and conducted by Arthur Rubenstein.

Gwen Verdon narrated the story for a 1971 Caedmon Records recording, The Story of Ferdinand and Other Stories (TC 1341).

In 1973, Columbia Records released a recording, The Story of Ferdinand/Andy and the Lion (CR 21519), narrated by Owen Jordan.

== Film adaptations ==
The story was adapted by Walt Disney as a short animated film entitled Ferdinand the Bull in 1938, in a style similar to his Silly Symphonies series. Ferdinand the Bull won the 1938 Academy Award for Best Short Subject (Cartoons).

A 3D feature-length computer-animated film remake, titled Ferdinand, was released in 2017. It was directed by Carlos Saldanha and produced by 20th Century Fox Animation and Blue Sky Studios. Ferdinand was nominated for Best Animated Film (but losing to Pixar's Coco) in the 90th Academy Awards.
