= Robert Lawson (author) =

American children's illustrator and writer (1892–1957)

- Born: October 4, 1892; New York City, New York, U.S.
- Died: May 27, 1957 (aged 64); Westport, Connecticut, U.S.
- Education: New York School of Fine Arts
- Occupations: author, illustrator, etcher
- Spouse: Marie Abrams (married 1922)
- Writing career
- Years active: 1914-1957
- Notable awards: Caldecott Medal; Newbery Medal; John Taylor Arms Prize

Robert Lawson (October 4, 1892 – May 27, 1957) was an American writer and artist, best known for his work as an author and illustrator of children's literature. Lawson won the Caldecott Medal in 1941 for his illustrations in They Were Strong and Good and the Newbery Medal in 1945 for his work on Rabbit Hill; he is the only person to have won both medals. In addition to his work in children's books, Lawson also created etchings, which earned him the John Taylor Arms Prize from the Society of American Etchers in 1931. His artwork, including etchings, prints, works in pen and ink, and pencil on paper, is held in prominent collections such as the Smithsonian American Art Museum and the Metropolitan Museum of Art.

== Biography ==
=== Early life ===
Robert Lawson was born on October 4, 1892, in New York City. He was raised in Montclair, New Jersey, where he developed an early interest in art while in high school. He went on to study art at the New York School of Fine Arts (now Parsons School of Design) from 1911 to 1914. There he received instruction by illustrator Howard Giles (an advocate of dynamic symmetry as conceived by Jay Hambidge).

His career as an illustrator began in 1914, when his illustration for a poem about the invasion of Belgium was published in Harper's Weekly. He went on to publish in other magazines, including the Ladies Home Journal, Everybody's Magazine, Century Magazine, Vogue, and Designer.

=== Military service—Camouflage Corps ===
Lawson served in the U.S. Army from 1917 to 1919, partially during World War I. He was a member of the first U.S. Army camouflage unit, the American Camouflage Corps, in which he served in France with fellow artists Barry Faulkner, Sherry Edmundson Fry, William Twigg-Smith and Kerr Eby (Behrens 2009). In his autobiography, Faulkner recalls that Lawson had a remarkable "sense of fantasy and humor", which made him especially valuable when the camoufleurs put on musical shows for the children of the French women who worked with them on camouflage.

=== Post–World War I ===
After serving in World War I, Lawson began doing illustrations for Century Magazine and other publications. He illustrated his first children's book, The Wonderful Adventures of Little Prince Toofat, in 1922.

Lawson married fellow artist and illustrator Marie Abrams in 1922. They moved to Westport, Connecticut, in 1923, where they designed Christmas cards.

== Art and writing career ==
=== Etchings ===
In the early 1930s, Lawson became interested in etching. For his work, 1931, was awarded the John Taylor Arms Prize by the Society of American Etchers. One of the most significant etchings created by Lawson was the 1932 Presentation Plate for members of the Society of American Etchers, which depicted Pegasus. According to The Brooklyn Daily Eagle (November 13, 1932), the presentation of a print by a prominent American artist was an annual feature of the society's activities since its foundation in 1915. Each year, an active member of the society was commissioned to create a plate for its membership.

Lawson's etchings are held in notable collections such as the Smithsonian American Art Museum and the Metropolitan Museum of Art.

=== Children's books—illustrator and author ===
Lawson's cover for Ben and Me

After the war, Lawson resumed his work as an artist, and in 1922, illustrated his first children's book, The Wonderful Adventures of Little Prince Toofat. Subsequently, he illustrated dozens of children's books by other authors, including such well-known titles as The Story of Ferdinand (1936) by Munro Leaf and Mr. Popper's Penguins (1938) by Richard and Florence Atwater. In total, he illustrated as many as 40 books by other writers and 17 others that he wrote himself. These latter works included They Were Strong and Good (1940) (which won the Caldecott Medal in 1941), Ben and Me: An Astonishing Life of Benjamin Franklin by His Good Mouse Amos (1939) (which earned a Lewis Carroll Shelf Award in 1961), and Rabbit Hill (1944) (which won the Newbery Award in 1945).

The Story of Ferdinand (which Lawson illustrated) was adapted into Ferdinand the Bull by Walt Disney Productions in 1938. Ben and Me: An Astonishing Life of Benjamin Franklin by His Good Mouse Amos was adapted into the animated short Ben and Me in 1953 by Walt Disney Productions.

A common trope within Lawson's works was a person's life as seen through the eyes of a companion animal, an approach that he first realized in Ben and Me. Some of his later books employed the same device (which was compatible with his style of illustration) to other figures, such as Christopher Columbus (I Discover Columbus) and Paul Revere (Mr. Revere and I). Captain Kidd's Cat, which he both wrote and illustrated, is narrated by the feline in the title, named McDermot, who tells the story of the famous pirate's ill-starred voyage, in the process of which he is shown to have been a brave, upright, honest man betrayed by his friends and calumniated by posterity. In The Story of Ferdinand the Bull, he illustrates a cork tree as a tree that bears corks as fruit, ready to be picked and placed into bottles.

=== Final years and legacy ===
Lawson died in 1957 at age 64 in Westport, Connecticut, in his home, that he referred to as "Rabbit Hill". He is buried in Mountain Grove Cemetery, in Bridgeport, Connecticut.

In 2001, the annual Rabbit Hill Festival of Literature, celebrating children's books, was first held in Westport, Connecticut. It is named in honor of Lawson, being named after Rabbit Hill, the name of his's home and his 1945 Newbery Medal winner.

== Exhibitions and collections ==
The largest collection of Robert Lawson's art is at the Free Library of Philadelphia Rare Book Department. The Free Library collection contains items dating from 1900 to 1983, with illustrations making up most of their collection. Notably, the collection includes the dummy for The Story of Ferdinand, and the original work for Mr. Popper's Penguins, and Wee Gillis.

The Metropolitan Museum of Art holds the following:

- Midnight (c. 1929–35), etching
- Leprechaun Playing the Harp from The Dial (1930), print
- Leprechaun Seated and Thinking (recto), Leprechaun Riding a Pig (verso) (c. 1930), print
- We Fix Flats (1932), etching
- They Were Strong and Good (1952), print

The Smithsonian American Art Museum has nine of his art pieces in its collection:

- Finished Drawing – Welcome of Washington (n.d.), pencil on paperboard
- Little Elf by Big Shoe (n.d.), etching
- New York Welcomes the President-Elect (from the portfolio “The Bicentennial Pageant of George Washington”) (1932), etching on paper
- New York Welcomes the President-Elect (n.d.), pen and ink, charcoal and Chinese white on paperboard
- Preliminary Sketch – Welcome of Washington (n.d.), pen and ink, charcoal and Chinese white on paperboard
- Pegasus (n.d.), etching
- New York Welcomes the President-Elect (cancelled plate from the portfolio The Bicentennial Pageant of George Washington) (c. 1932), etching
- New York Welcomes the President-Elect (n.d.), pen and ink, charcoal and Chinese white
- The March of Progress (c. 1930–1931), etching

The Robert Lawson Papers are in the University of Minnesota Children's Literature Research Collections.

== Works ==
=== Author ===
Lawson authored many children's books, including Rabbit Hill, for which he was awarded the 1944 Newbery Medal.

- Country Colic. Boston: Little, Brown and Co., 1944.
- Rabbit Hill. New York: Viking Press, 1944. also Junior Literary Guild
- Mr. Wilmer. Boston: Little, Brown and Co., 1945.
- At That Time. New York: Viking Press, 1947.
- Mr. Twigg's Mistake. Boston: Little, Brown and Co., 1947.
- Robbut: A Tale of Tails. New York: Viking Press, 1948.
- Dick Whittington and His Cat. New York: Limited Editions Club, 1949.
- The Fabulous Flight. Boston: Little, Brown and Co., 1949.
- Smeller Martin. New York: Viking Press, 1950.
- McWhinney's Jaunt. Boston: Little, Brown and Co., 1951.
- Edward, Hoppy and Joe. New York: Alfred A. Knopf, 1952.
- Mr. Revere and I. Boston: Little, Brown and Co., 1953.
- The Tough Winter. New York: Viking Press, 1954. also Junior Literary Guild
- Captain Kidd's Cat. Boston: Little, Brown and Co., 1956.
- The Great Wheel. New York: Viking Press, 1957.
- Yolen, Jane. Spaceships & Spells: A collection of new fantasy and science-fiction stories. New York: Harper & Row, (1987). Contains the Robert Lawson short story "The Silver Leopard".

=== Illustrator ===
Lawson illustrated many books, both those that he authored, and for fellow children's literature authors. He won the 1941 Caldecott Medal for his illustration of his book They Were Strong and Good.

- Chester, George Randolph, The Wonderful Adventures of Little Prince Toofat. New York: James A. McCann, 1922.
- Mason, Arthur, The Wee Men of Ballywooden. Garden City, New York: Doubleday, Doran, 1930; New York: Viking Press, 1952.
- Bianco, Margery Williams, "The House That Grew Small". St. Nicholas Magazine 58 (September 1931): 764–66, 782–83.
- Mason, Arthur, From the Horn of the Moon. Garden City, New York: Doubleday, Doran, 1931. Excerpted as "Moving of the Bog", St. Nicholas Magazine 58 (July 1931): 644–47, 667–70.
- Mason, Arthur, The Roving Lobster. Garden City, New York: Doubleday, Doran, 1931.
- Untermeyer, Louis, "The Donkey of God". St. Nicholas Magazine 59 (December 1931): 59–61, 105–108.
- Ring, Barbara, Peik. Translated by Lorence Munson Woodside. Boston: Little, Brown and Co., 1932.
- Young, Ella, The Unicorn with Silver Shoes. New York: Longmans, Green, 1932.
- Bianco, Margery Williams, The Hurdy-Gurdy Man. New York: Oxford University Press, 1933.
- Marquand, John P., Haven's End. Boston: Little, Brown and Co., 1933.
- Haines, William Wister, Slim. Boston: Little, Brown and Co., 1934.
- Tarn, William Woodthorpe, The Treasure of the Isle of Mist. New York: G. P. Putnam's Sons, 1934. also Junior Literary Guild
- Coatsworth, Elizabeth, The Golden Horseshoe. New York: Macmillan & Co., 1935; rev. ed., 1968.
- Sterne, Emma Gelders, Drums of Monmouth. New York: Dodd, Mead & Co., 1935.
- Bates, Helen Dixon, Betsy Ross. New York: Whittlesey House and McGraw-Hill, 1936.
- Bates, Helen Dixon, Francis Scott Key. New York: Whittlesey House and McGraw-Hill, 1936.
- Gale, Elizabeth, Seven Beads of Wampum. New York: G. P. Putnam's Sons, 1936. also Junior Literary Guild
- Glenn, Mabelle, et al., eds., Tunes and Harmonies. Boston: Athenaeum Press, 1936. The Revised 1943 edition is lacking the Full Page, Two-Color illustration found at page 8 in the 1936 edition.
- Leaf, Munro, The Story of Ferdinand. New York: Viking Press, 1936.
- Barnes, Ruth A., ed., I Hear America Singing: An Anthology of Folk Poetry. Chicago: John C. Winston Co. and the Junior Literary Guild, 1937.
- Bowie, Walter Russell, The Story of Jesus for Young People. New York: Charles Scribner's Sons, 1937.
- Brewton, John E., Under the Tent of the Sky: A Collection of Poems about Animals Large and Small. New York: Macmillan & Co., 1937.
- Cormack, Maribelle, Wind of the Vikings: A Tale of the Orkney Isles. New York: D. Appleton-Century, 1937.
- Fish, Helen Dean, ed., Four and Twenty Blackbirds: Nursery Rhymes of Yesterday Recalled for Children of To-Day. New York: Frederick. A. Stokes, 1937.
- MacDonald, Rose Mortimer Ellzey. Nelly Custis Daughter of Mount Vernon. Boston: Athenaeum Press, 1937. Lawson End Pages only
- Rosmer, Jean, In Secret Service: A Mystery Story of Napoleon's Court. Translated by Virginia Olcott. Philadelphia: J. B. Lippincott, 1937.
- Sterne, Emma Gelders, Miranda Is a Princess: A Story of Old Spain. New York: Dodd, Mead & Co., 1937.
- Stratton, Clarence, Swords and Statues: A Tale of Sixteenth Century Italy. New York: John C. Winston Co. and the Junior Literary Guild, 1937.
- Twain, Mark, The Prince and the Pauper. Chicago: John C. Winston Co., 1937.
- Atwater, Richard, and Florence Atwater, Robert Lawson (illustrator). Mr. Popper's Penguins. Boston: Little, Brown and Co., 1938.
- Farjeon, Eleanor, One Foot in Fairyland. New York: Frederick A. Stokes, 1938.
- Haines, William Wister, High Tension. Boston: Little, Brown and Co., 1938.
- Leaf, Munro, Wee Gillis. New York: Viking Press, 1938.
- Lawson, Robert. Ben and Me. Boston: Little, Brown and Co., 1939.
- Bunyan, John, Pilgrim's Progress. Text revised by Mary Godolphin. New York: Frederick A. Stokes, 1939.
- White, T. H., The Sword in the Stone. New York: G. P. Putnam's Sons, 1939.
- Lawson, Robert. Just for Fun: A Collection of Stories and Verses. Chicago: Rand McNally, 1940.
- Lawson, Robert. They Were Strong and Good. New York: Viking Press, 1940; rev. ed., 1968.
- Brewton, John E, Gaily We Parade: A Collection of Poems about People, Here, There and Everywhere. New York: Macmillan & Co., 1940.
- Lawson, Robert. I Discover Columbus. Boston: Little, Brown and Co., 1941.
- Leaf, Munro, Aesop's Fables. New York: Heritage Press, 1941.
- Leaf, Munro, The Story of Simpson and Sampson. New York: Viking Press, 1941.
- C. S. Forester, Poo-Poo and the Dragons. Boston: Little, Brown and Co., 1942.
- Gray, Elizabeth Janet, c. New York: Viking Press, 1942.
- Lang, Andrew, Prince Prigio. Boston: Little, Brown and Co., 1942.
- Stephens, James, The Crock of Gold. New York: Limited Editions Club, 1942.
- Lawson, Robert. Watchwords of Liberty. Boston: Little, Brown and Co., 1943; rev. ed., 1957.
- Teal, Val, The Little Woman Wanted Noise. New York: Rand McNally, 1943; rev. ed., 1967.
- The Woman's Club of Westport. The Connecticut Cookbook. Westport, Connecticut: Westport Women's Club, 1943, Paperback w/wire spine, (p. 28). Reprinted New York: Harper & Brothers, 1944.
- Neilson, Frances F., and Winthrop Neilson, Benjamin Franklin. Reader in Real People Series. New York: Row, Peterson, 1950. Reprinted 1963 by California State Department of Education.
- Hall, William, The Shoelace Robin. New York: Thomas Y. Crowell, 1945.
- Robinson, Tom, Greylock and the Robins. New York: Viking Press and the Junior Literary Guild, 1946.
- Potter, Mary A., et al., Mathematics for Success. Boston: Athenaeum Press, 1952. Revised 1960 edition has No Lawson Illustrations.
