= Munro Leaf =

American writer and illustrator (1905–1976)

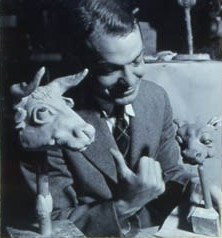
- Born: Wilbur Monroe Leaf; December 4, 1905; Hamilton, Maryland
- Died: December 21, 1976 (aged 71); Garrett Park, Maryland

Wilbur Monroe Leaf (a.k.a. Munro Leaf) (December 4, 1905 – December 21, 1976) was an American writer of children's literature who wrote and illustrated nearly 40 books during his 40-year career. He is best known for The Story of Ferdinand (1936), a children's classic which he wrote on a yellow legal-length pad in less than an hour. Labeled as subversive, it stirred an international controversy.

== Early life ==
Munroe Wilbur Leaf (as he was listed in the 1910 census) was born on December 4, 1905, the son of Charles W Leaf (1871-1965) and Emma India Leaf in Hamilton, Maryland. Leaf had an older sister, Elizabeth W Leaf. By 1910 his family lived in Washington, D.C., where his father had established his career as a machinist at the Government Printing Office. Leaf studied at the University of Maryland where he played lacrosse and served as class treasurer, graduating in 1927 as "Wilbur Monroe Leaf." He honeymooned with his wife Margaret Pope in Europe in 1928. He graduated from Harvard University with a master's degree in English literature in 1931.

== Career ==
He taught secondary school English at the Belmont Hill School in Boston in 1929 and then worked as an editor with the publisher Frederick A. Stokes Company. Leaf once commented, "Early on in my writing career I realized that if one found some truths worth telling they should be told to the young in terms that were understandable to them."

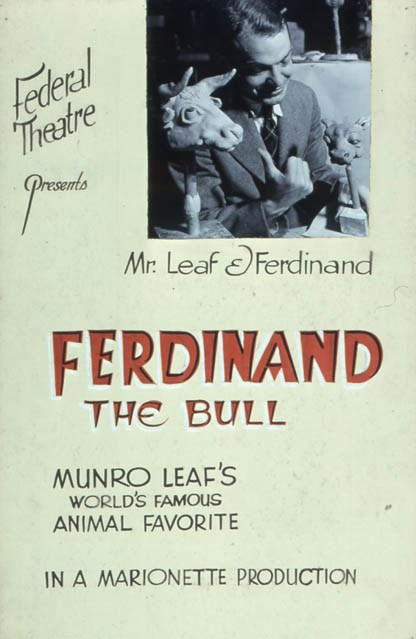
Munro Leaf on the poster for the Federal Theatre Project marionette production of Ferdinand the Bull (1937)

Leaf wrote The Story of Ferdinand for his friend, illustrator Robert Lawson. The story, which follows a gentle bull in rural Spain who prefers smelling flowers to bullfighting, sparked considerable controversy because Ferdinand was regarded by some as a pacifist symbol. Banned in Spain and burned as propaganda in Nazi Germany, the book had over 60 foreign translations and has never gone out of print. The story was adapted into a Walt Disney film which won a 1938 Academy Award.

Leaf and Lawson's second collaboration, Wee Gillis, about a boy living in Scotland halfway between his father's family in the Highlands and his mother's in the Lowlands, was cited as a 1939 Caldecott Honor Book.

It's Murder She Says, Private Snafu cartoon directed by Chuck Jones, co-written by Dr. Seuss and Munro Leaf

In the 1930s and 1940s Leaf wrote a regular feature for The American Magazine, titled "Streamlined Samples of the World's Best Stories," offering one-page, jocular, off-the-cuff condensations of Ivanhoe, Robinson Crusoe, Romeo and Juliet and others.

=== Watchbirds ===
Leaf's other notable creation was the Watchbirds cartoon series, a cartoon commentary on human behavior. It ran as a regular feature in the Ladies' Home Journal during the late 1930s and 1940s and was later collected into several books.

=== During WWII ===
During World War II, Leaf worked for the Army Department and after the war, he volunteered his skills to the State Department, insisting he was "anxious to work with the [Office of Public Affairs] (without compensation and in an unofficial capacity)...on international policy matters". This collaboration resulted in a cartoon book, published by the Committee for the Marshall Plan, titled Who Is the Man Against the Marshall Plan?, a Bibliography of Basic Official Documents.

During World War II, Leaf and Ted Geisel (a.k.a. Dr. Seuss) created the pamphlet This Is Ann, about a mosquito spreading malaria to men who failed to take precautions.

=== Post-war years ===
Leaf went on to write 25 books after his service in World War II. Two of them, Four and Twenty Watchbirds and How to Speak Politely and Why, were published posthumously.

== Personal life ==
Leaf died from cancer at age 71 in his home in suburban Garrett Park, Maryland, on December 21, 1976.

Leaf's University of Maryland lacrosse stick was donated as the travelling trophy between Ann Arbor Pioneer and Ann Arbor Skyline high schools, to be possessed by the winner of each matchup between contests.

== Legacy ==
On April 22, 1995, Leaf was inducted into the University of Maryland Alumni Hall of Fame. Some of his books have been brought back into print in recent years.

The English composer Alan Ridout set The Story of Ferdinand to music. A version in French, released on Analekta (AN2 8741–2), is Solo by Angèle Dubeau, narrated by Pierre Lebeau.

In 1998, the Minnesota Orchestra commissioned Alice Gomez to write two works based on The Story of Ferdinand. Composed in a Spanish style, El Piquete de Abeja (the Bee Sting) and Habanera de Ferdinand make up the Ferdinand-inspired suite. These works were recorded in 2008 by the Michigan Philharmonic.

== Bibliography ==
- Grammar Can Be Fun, New York, Frederick A. Stokes, 1934.
- Lo, the Poor Indian, New York, Leaf, Mahoney, Seidel & Stokes, 1934.
- The Boy Who Would Not Go to School: Robert Francis Weatherbee, New York, Frederick A. Stokes Co., 1935.
- Manners Can Be Fun, New York, Frederick A. Stokes, 1936.
- Leaf, Munro, Robert Lawson (illustrator). The Story of Ferdinand, New York, Viking Press, 1936.
- Leaf, Munro, Ludwig Bemelmans (illustrator) Noodle, New York, Frederick A. Stokes, 1937.
- Leaf, Munro, Robert Lawson (illustrator). Wee Gillis, New York, Viking Press, 1938.
- Leaf, Munro, Dick Rose (illustrator) Listen Little Girl, Before You Come to New York, New York: Frederick A. Stokes Co., 1938.
- Leaf, Munro, Disney Illustrators. Walt Disney's Ferdinand the Bull, New York, Dell Publishing, 1938.
- The Watchbirds, New York, Frederick A. Stokes, 1938.
- Safety Can Be Fun New York, Frederick A. Stokes, 1938.
- Fair Play, New York, Frederick A. Stokes, 1939.
- More Watchbirds: A Picture Book of Behavior, New York, Frederick A. Stokes Company, 1940.
- John Henry Davis, New York, Frederick A Stokes, 1940.
- Fly Away, Watchbird: A Picture Book of Behavior, New York, Frederick A Stokes Company, 1941.
- Leaf, Munro, Robert Lawson (illustrator). Aesop's Fables, New York, Heritage Press, 1941.
- Munro Leaf's Fun Book, New York, Frederick A. Stokes Company, 1941.
- Leaf, Munro, Robert Lawson. The Story of Simpson and Sampson, New York, Viking Press, 1941.
- A War-Time Handbook for Young Americans, Philadelphia, Frederick A. Stokes Company, 1942.
- My Book to Help America, Racine, WI: Whitman Publishing Co, 1942.
- Leaf, Munro, Theodor Seuss Geisel (illustrator). This Is Ann, She's Dying to Meet You., US Government War Department, Washington, 1943.
- Health Can be Fun, New York, J.B. Lippincott, 1943.
- Gordon The Goat, Philadelphia and New York, J.B. Lippincott Co., 1944.
- 3 and 30 Watchbirds: A Picture Book of Behavior, Philadelphia, J.B. Lippincott Co., 1944.
- Let's Do Better, J.B. Lippincott Co., 1945.
- Calvert, John (Munro Leaf) Garrett Price (illustrator). Gwendolyn the Goose, Random House, 1946.
- How to Behave and Why, Philadelphia, J.B. Lippincott, 1946.
- Flock of Watchbirds, New York, J.B. Lippincott, 1946.
- Who Is the Man Against the Marshall Plan, Committee for the Marshall Plan, 1947.
- Leaf, Munro, Frances Tipton Hunte (Illustrator). Boo, Who Used to Be Scared of the Dark, New York, Random House, 1948.
- Sam and the Superdroop, New York, Viking Press, 1948.
- Menninger, William C. (M.D.); Leaf, Munro. You and Psychiatry, New York, Charles Scribner's Sons, 1948.
- Arithmetic Can Be Fun, Philadelphia, J.B. Lippincott, 1949.
- History Can Be Fun, Philadelphia, Lippincott Co, 1950.
- The Danger of Hiding Our Heads, Committee on the Present Danger, 1951.
- Geography Can Be Fun!, Philadelphia, J.B. Lippincott, 1951.
- Reading Can Be Fun, Philadelphia, J.B. Lippincott, 1953.
- Lucky You, J.B. Lippincott, 1955.
- How to Behave and Why, J.B. Lippincott, 1955.
- Three Promises to You, Philadelphia: J.B. Lippincott, 1957.
- Science Can Be Fun, Philadelphia, J.B. Lippincott, 1958.
- The Wishing Pool, New York: J.B. Lippincott, 1960.
- Being an American Can Be Fun, Philadelphia, J.B. Lippincott. 1964.
- Turnabout, Philadelphia, J.B. Lippincott Company, 1967.
- I Hate You, Boston, Sterling Institute Press, 1968.
- Who Cares? I Do, New York, J.B. Lippincott, 1971.
- Metric Can Be Fun, Winnipeg, MB, Canada, J.B. Lippincott Company, 1976.
- Four and Twenty Watchbirds, Hamden, Connecticut, Linnet Books, 1990.
- How to Speak Politely and Why, Universe, 2005.
