= Francis Merritt =

Francis Merritt may refer to:

- Francis E. Merritt (1920–1995), American football player
- Francis Sumner Merritt (1913–2000), American painter, teacher, and arts administrator
