= Cottage Gallery =

Art gallery in Carmel, California, US

Coordinates: 36.5556°N 121.9210°W

Cottage Gallery was an art gallery that was located in Carmel, California. It was owned and operated by George Goff. It opened in November 1984, and closed in 2001. The gallery mostly showed original oil paintings by living artists. Its significance arose primarily from the involvement of artist Thomas Kinkade, a friend of Goff's. Kinkade suggested its name because of Carmel's quaint look and because the building that housed the gallery had a pseudo-cottage feel. It was located at the corner of Sixth and Mission. He also designed the logo which appeared on the gallery's main outdoor sign and all stationary and collateral material. Cottage Gallery was one of the first galleries in which Kinkade showed his paintings. Kinkade produced paintings under a “brush name” of Robert Girrard and Cottage Gallery was the only gallery that showed those paintings. For decades only a handful of people knew that Robert Girrard was Thomas Kinkade.

== Artists represented by Cottage Gallery ==
1. Tom Browning
2. Lindsay Dawson
3. Robert Girrard (a.k.a. Thomas Kinkade)
4. Thomas Kinkade
5. John Terelak
6. Barry Thomas
7. Edward Ward
8. Sha-Kong Wang
9. Edward Glafke
10. Dave DeMatteo
