= Blueberries for Sal =

1948 picture book by Robert McCloskey

- First edition cover
- Author: Robert McCloskey
- Illustrator: Robert McCloskey
- Cover artist: Robert McCloskey
- Genre: Children's book
- Publisher: The Viking Press
- Publication date: 1948
- Publication place: United States
- Media type: Hardback, Paperback and Kindle Edition
- Pages: 55
- ISBN: 0-670-17591-9

Blueberries for Sal is a classic children's picture book written and illustrated by Robert McCloskey in 1948. The story is set in Maine, following the adventures of a young girl named Sal and a bear cub named Little Bear as they both go blueberry picking with their respective mothers before winter.

The book was awarded the Caldecott Honor in 1949. Blueberries for Sal was ranked number 13 among the "Top 100 Picture Books" in a 2009 survey published by School Library Journal. It was ranked number 31 in a reiteration three years later.

== Plot summary ==
"The book opens and closes with a picture of little Sal and her mother in the kitchen, the mother is canning blueberries... One sees in this opening picture Sal entertaining herself by placing the canning rings on her wrist and a spoon, a simple childlike act which helps to set the stage for Sal's obvious child actions throughout the books. This is not to be the overly diligent or angelic girl of so many other books, Sal is a real child figure. She gets into mischief and causes her mother no end of trouble.”

Little Sal's mother takes her to Blueberry Hill to pick berries. Sal drops three berries in her bucket, then eats them. This continues as she and her mother concentrate on the berries and gradually get separated on the hill. What they don't realize is that a mother bear and her cub have also come to Blueberry Hill to eat berries for the winter. The book uses a number of visual and verbal techniques to compare and contrast the bear and the human families. Both families' pictures are similar in composition, but they head in opposite directions when they reach the blueberry patch. Little Sal’s mother tells her that they can’t eat all the berries because they need to save them to can for the winter, but the bear mother tells her child to eat as much as it can to store up fat for winter. The bear's way of preparing for winter is more natural for Sal who soon wanders off to eat.

Sal and the bear cub get mixed up and follow after the wrong mother. It takes the mothers several minutes to realize they're being followed by the wrong child; it isn't until the bear cub tries to eat from Sal's mother's bucket and the mother bear hears the "ku-plink, ku-plank, ku-plunk" sound of Sal dropping blueberries into her tin pail that they realize what happened. Ultimately each child is reunited with its proper mother and they both leave the hill. Just before leaving Sal drops a blueberry into her empty pail. The endpapers show Sal again playing in the kitchen while her mother cans berries.

A sequel to the book, One Morning in Maine, takes place a few years later, and revisits little Sal and her mother, and introduces Sal's father and younger sister.

== Illustrations ==
The book uses a single dark blue colour and block printing for the illustrations. Sal and Sal's mother are modelled after McCloskey's daughter, Sally, and wife Peggy. According to Sal's younger sister Jane --- shown in "One Morning In Maine" and "Time Of Wonder" --- McCloskey wrote the book for Sal because she was feeling a little left out in terms of parental attention when Jane was born, so her father created the book to be all about Sal, to make her feel more special and loved.

== Interpretation ==
The story is often interpreted as an idealized fable on the subject of ethnicity and cultural differences. Little Sal and Little Bear, being young and innocent, do not see any differences between their cultures and happily accept the different versions of motherhood they encounter. The story shows that differences in food and childrearing practices are accepted by young children as part of that family's difference, regardless of their cultural background.

== Film adaptation ==
The book was adapted as a short film in 1967 by Weston Woods, narrated by Owen Jordan. The short simply consisted of shots of the original book's illustrations - colorized therein - and featured a musical score performed entirely by woodwind instruments. This short film is included on the Scholastic DVD Make Way for Ducklings and More Robert McCloskey Stories (2004), along with Make Way for Ducklings and Time of Wonder.
