= Donald Schön =

American academic (1930–1997)

Donald A. Schön
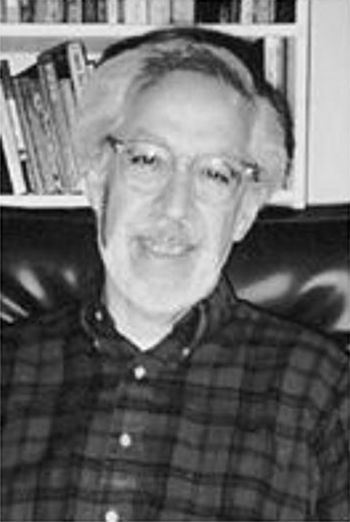
- Born: September 19, 1930; Boston, Massachusetts
- Died: September 13, 1997 (aged 66); Boston, Massachusetts
- Education: Yale University (B.A.); The Sorbonne; Harvard University (Ph.D.)
- Occupation(s): Learning theorist, philosopher
- Employer(s): Arthur D. Little, Inc. MIT
- Spouse: Nancy Quint
- Children: Ellen, Andrew, Elizabeth, Susan

Donald Alan Schön (September 19, 1930 – September 13, 1997) was an American philosopher and professor in urban planning at the Massachusetts Institute of Technology. He developed the concept of reflective practice and contributed to the theory of organizational learning.

== Education and career ==
He was born in Boston and brought up in Massachusetts, at Brookline and Worcester. After undertaking a Bachelor's at Yale University, he completed Master's and doctoral studies in philosophy at Harvard University. His thesis dealt with John Dewey's theory of inquiry. He also studied at the Sorbonne in Paris and pursued advanced study in music (piano and clarinet).

For many years Schön was with the large consulting firm, Arthur D. Little along with Raymond Hainer with whom he worked on his ideas which resulted in his first seminal work, The Displacement of Concepts. In fact this original work was a new interpretation on the history of the ideas of all time—a complement to Thomas Kuhn's work or even a more accurate look at the dynamics of invention. His later works there presaged a lifetime of interest in the subtle processes whereby technological and other change is absorbed (or not) by social systems. In 1970, he delivered the Reith Lectures for the BBC, on how learning occurs within organizations and societies that are in permanent states of flux. These presentations were published subsequently in his Beyond the Stable State.

Donald Schön became a visiting professor at the Massachusetts Institute of Technology in 1968 and stayed on with an appointment in 1972 as Ford Professor of Urban Studies and Education. He remained there until his death in 1997. During these decades his long collaboration with adult education/organizational behavior expert Chris Argyris yielded key insights into the question of how organizations develop, adapt, learn or fail in these critical missions. Their collaboration led to two books in the 1970s— Theory in Practice and Organizational Learning— the latter of which was completely revised and published in 1996 as Organizational Learning II.

== Contributions ==
Donald Schön introduced several important organizing concepts to a wide range of applied fields. He proposed the idea of a "generative metaphor" as figurative descriptions of social situations, usually implicit and even semi-conscious but that shape the way problems are tackled. For example he argued that the practice of describing a troubled inner city neighborhood as urban "blight" and, hence, taking steps rooted in the idea of disease, led to disastrous "urban renewal" projects in the 1960s. In the move for the renewal of the slum area the approach based on the metaphorical view that it is a "blight" or a diseased body is different if the area is metaphorically seen as a natural community with a stifled natural growth.

Schön also developed the concept of "learning systems" as he pioneered the studies that aimed to explore the possibility of learning at the supra-individual level. In 1971, he identified a state's government as an example of a learning system in the book Beyond the Stable State. Two years later, he further explained that "a learning system must be one which dynamic conservatism operates at such a level in such a way as to permit change of state, without intolerable threat to the essential functions the system fulfils for the self."

Schön devoted a trilogy of books, which included The Reflective Practitioner (1983), to his argument for reflection and his notion of the reflective practice inquiry. This emerged out of a self-described inability to understand the process of planning, which included his failure to determine what his students learned from field work experience. Schön then addressed this problem when he developed his "reflection-in-action" notion explained in the book. This involved the examination of the thinking, talking, and interacting processes through a series of case studies involving different professionals working in the engineering, architecture, management, psychotherapy, and town planning domains. His model challenged practitioners to reconsider the role of technical knowledge versus "artistry" in developing professional excellence. The concept most notably affected study of teacher education, health and social care professions and architectural design. This was demonstrated in the way it influenced constructivist teacher education reformers, who studied architectural and other professional practices. Schön also criticized what he called the commitment on the part of institutions of higher learning to a view of knowledge that featured a "selective inattention to professional competence". In the context of reflective practice, Schön suggested the replacement of the dominant epistemology of technical rationalism with his reflection-in-action framework. His work contributed to the transition of MIT's Department of City and Regional Planning to become the Department of Urban Studies and Planning.

Schön also developed Conversation with the Situation - an approach to understand the design process. Through a series of case studies, he explained that the pattern of thinking, talking, and interacting for different types of professionals identified as designers (architects, city planner, engineer, psychoanalyst, scientist, and business manager) are similar with the way they perform strategic moves that is analogous to "talking to the situation" and following which the situation "talks back".

Together with his MIT colleague Martin Rein, Schön outlined in 1994 the so-called frame reflection, which prescribed critical shared reconstruction of "frames" of social problems which are otherwise taken for granted and advocated system-level learning to find solutions for "intractable policy controversies." Schön maintained that a shift is needed in the frame of our perception - from the currently accepted framework to critical reflection and transformational learning.

Much of his later work related to reflection in practice and the concept of learning systems. The course of his career would cover three areas in this field: 1) the learning society; 2) professional learning and effectiveness; and, 3) the reflective practitioner. Together with Chris Argyris, Schön provided the foundation to much of the management thinking on descriptive and interventionist dimensions to learning research. One of their theories hold that organizations and individuals should be flexible and should incorporate lessons learned throughout their lifespans, known as organizational learning. His interest and involvement in jazz music inspired him to teach the concept of improvisation and 'thinking on one's feet', and that through a feedback loop of experience, learning and practice, we can continually improve our work (whether educational or not) and become a 'reflective practitioner'. Thus, the work of Schön fits with and extends to the realm of many fields of practice, key twentieth century theories of education, like experiential education and the work of many of its most important theorists, namely John Dewey, Kurt Lewin, Carl Rogers and David A. Kolb.

Schön believed that people and organizations should be flexible and incorporate their life experiences and lessons learned throughout their life. This is also known as Organizational learning (Fulmer, 1994). Organizational learning is based on two things. The first being single–loop learning and the second being double–loop learning. The former refers to the process that occurs when organizations adjust their operations to keep apace with changing market conditions. And then the latter refers to not just adjusting to the market, but also to the creation of new and better ways of achieving business goals (Fulmer, 1994).

== Personal life ==
Donald Schön was married to sculptor Nancy Schön who is particularly well known for her installation in the Boston Public Garden of the bronze duck family from McCloskey's children's classic "Make Way for Ducklings". Nancy Schön completed a sequence of works titled "The Reflective Giraffe" in tribute to her late husband with a giraffe as the central icon.

== Major works ==
- The Displacement of Concepts. London: Tavistock, 1963.
- Technology and change: The new Heraclitus. Oxford: Pergamon, 1967.
- Beyond the Stable State. Harmondsworth: Penguin/ New York: Norton, 1973
- (with C. Argyris) Theory in practice: Increasing professional effectiveness. San Francisco: Jossey-Bass, 1974.
- (with C. Argyris) Organizational learning: A theory of action perspective. Reading, MA: Addison-Wesley, 1978.
- The Reflective Practitioner: How professionals think in action. London: Temple Smith, 1983.
- Educating the Reflective Practitioner. San Francisco: Jossey-Bass, 1987.
- (ed.) The Reflective Turn: Case studies in and on educational practice. New York: Teachers College (Columbia), 1991
- (with M. Rein) Frame Reflection: Toward the Resolution of Intractable Policy Controversies. New York: Basic Books, 1994
- (with C. Argyris) Organizational learning II: Theory, method and practice. Reading, MA: Addison Wesley, 1996.

A bibliography was compiled in March 2015.
