= A Literary Nightmare =

- Short story by Mark Twain
- Country: United States
- Language: English

Publication
- Published in: The Atlantic Monthly
- Publication type: Periodical
- Media type: Print
- Publication date: February 1876
- Pages: 3

"A Literary Nightmare" is a short story written by Mark Twain in 1876. The story is about Twain's encounter with an earworm, or virus-like jingle, and how it occupies his mind for several days until he manages to "infect" another person, thus removing the jingle from his mind. The story was also later published under the name "Punch, Brothers, Punch!"

== Plot introduction ==
The narrator, Mark Twain, sees a catchy jingle in the morning newspaper. The jingle promptly attaches itself to his mind, such that he loses concentration and can no longer remember what he ate for breakfast, whether he ate at all, and what words he was going to use in his novel. The jingle mentally incapacitates him, until, a few days later, he takes a walk with his friend, the Reverend, and inadvertently transfers the jingle to the reverend's mind. As this happens, Twain experiences a sense of relief, and returns to his normal life.

Some days after Twain was cured, the Reverend visits him; he is in a terrible state, as the jingle, which keeps on repeating in his head, has already disabled his concentration. He tells Twain of some incidents where the rhythm of the jingle influenced his actions, such as when churchgoers started swaying to the rhythm of his homilies. Taking pity on the man, Twain decides to cure him, and brings him to a meeting of university students. The Reverend successfully manages to transfer the jingle from himself to the students, curing himself and, at the same time, continuing the cycle.

== The jingle ==
Conductor, when you receive a fare,
Punch in the presence of the passenjare!
A blue trip slip for an eight-cent fare,
A buff trip slip for a six-cent fare,
A pink trip slip for a three-cent fare,
Punch in the presence of the passenjare!

CHORUS
Punch, brothers! Punch with care!
Punch in the presence of the passenjare!

== History of the jingle ==
The poem was not composed by Mark Twain, but by a group of people in 1876. It was the brainchild of Isaac Bromley, Noah Brooks, W. C. Wyckoff, and Moses W. Handy. Bromley and Brooks, while riding a tram one night, had taken notice of a sign informing passengers about the fare:

A Blue Trip Slip for an 8-cents fare.
A Buff Trip Slip for a 6-cents fare.
A Pink Trip Slip for a 3-cents fare.
For Coupon and Transfer, punch the Tickets.

Bromley had reportedly exclaimed, "Brooks, it's poetry. By George, it's poetry!" The two spent the remainder of their trip composing the poem, giving it its jingle-like character, and adding improvements such as the chorus. Upon arrival at the offices of the New York Tribune, they showed the poem to their friends, scientific editor W. C. Wyckoff and Moses Handy, who assisted them in completing it.

They published their result in the Tribune, the same newspaper which Mark Twain had chanced upon. The poem gained popularity rapidly, taking over the minds of numerous people; it was assisted by Twain, who let it loose upon the world in his story. The jingle gained popularity among most of the population of Boston, Harvard students, and was even translated into French and Latin.

Elements of the tale are reused in "Pie and Punch and You-Know-Whats," one of Robert McCloskey's Homer Price stories, in which the "Punch, Brothers" jingle is used as a cure for another unstoppable jingle.

The progressive bluegrass band Punch Brothers got their name from the jingle, specifically citing Twain's story as inspiration.

The poem was set to music in 1972 as part of a song cycle, "Third Rail" by Donald Sosin, premiered in Ann Arbor that year, and subsequently performed in a few venues in New York. The movements are "Conductus" with the Twain poem declaimed in a deconstructed version by soprano and baritone with accompaniment by moneychanger, nose flute, and hand drum. The second movement is a setting of a Miss Subways poster, the third a reworking of a Reginald Gardner routine about train noises, the fourth a setting of a Penn Central ticket stub, and the last movement another setting of the "Punch Brothers" text, this time in a minimalist style.

== As a meme ==
Richard Dawkins, in his book Unweaving the Rainbow, cited the jingle of "A Literary Nightmare" as an excellent example of a meme – in this case, a "ridiculous fragment of versified instruction." The poem, through its catchy rhyme and rhythm, managed to convey itself from mind to mind, and in most cases inhabited the mind of the victims for several days.

== Translation attempts ==
The jingle's success in English led others to attempt it in French, Latin, and Italian, as noted in the New Bedford Morning Mercury, quoting The New York Times of August 8, 1915.

A French version entitled "Le Chant du Conducteur" was published with an attribution to Swinburne, though that attribution was evidently a joke; the text was said to appear in the literary journal Revue des deux Mondes, but there is no trace of it there or in Swinburne's books. This version begins:

Ayant ete paye, le conducteur,
Percera en pleine vue du voyageur,
Quand il recoit trois sous un coupon vert. &c.

A St. Louis magazine found relief in a Latin anthem with this chorus:

Pungite, fratres, pungite,
Pungite, cum amore,
Pungite pro vectore,
Diligentissime pungite.

In an Italian collection of Twain's short stories, the jingle reads as:

Controllor, quando ti si dà il biglietto
del viaggiator bucalo al cospetto!
Per un viaggio da un trentin, blu il fogliolin
per un viaggio da un ventin, invece marroncin
per un viaggio da un decine, rosa il tagliandin!

The first Russian translation came out as early as 1896. The most known, however, is the translation by Nina Daruzes from 1949:

Кондуктор, отправляясь в путь,
Не рви билеты как-нибудь;
Стриги как можно осторожней,
Чтоб видел пассажир дорожный.
Синий стоит восемь центов,
Желтый стоит девять центов,
Красный стоит только три.
Осторожней режь, смотри!

with the chorus:

Режьте, братцы, режьте! Режьте осторожно!
Режьте, чтобы видел пассажир дорожный!

== Mentions ==
The story was referenced in a Ted-Ed video about earworms, as evidence of earworms having always existed.
