= Camp Campbell Gard =

YMCA camp in Ohio, United States

Coordinates: 39°25′55″N 84°29′39″W

Camp Campbell Gard is a YMCA camp located on 600 acres (2.4 km^{2}) along the Great Miami River six miles (10 km) northeast of Hamilton, Ohio. The camp is on Augspurger Road in St. Clair Township.

The camp was dedicated to the memory of a World War I airman, Charles Campbell Gard, by his father Homer Gard in 1926, six years after Charles Campbell Gard's death. The dedication on Friday, July 1, 1926, featured remarks by former Ohio governors, James M. Cox and Charles P. Taft II, son of William Howard Taft.

When it opened in 1926, the new camp had 20 buildings, including a 20-foot (6.1 m) by 80-foot (24 m) dining hall with electric stoves and refrigeration; five cabins (quickly expanded to ten) that housed 12 people each; a recreational building "for rainy days"; an informal playground for games; and a guest house "equipped with hot and cold shower baths." As specified by Homer Gard, the camp also featured facilities for “crippled children” to make the facility accessible to the handicapped. Today the camp has expanded to 600 acres (2.4 km^{2}) and features heating and air conditioning.

== Noted Attendees ==
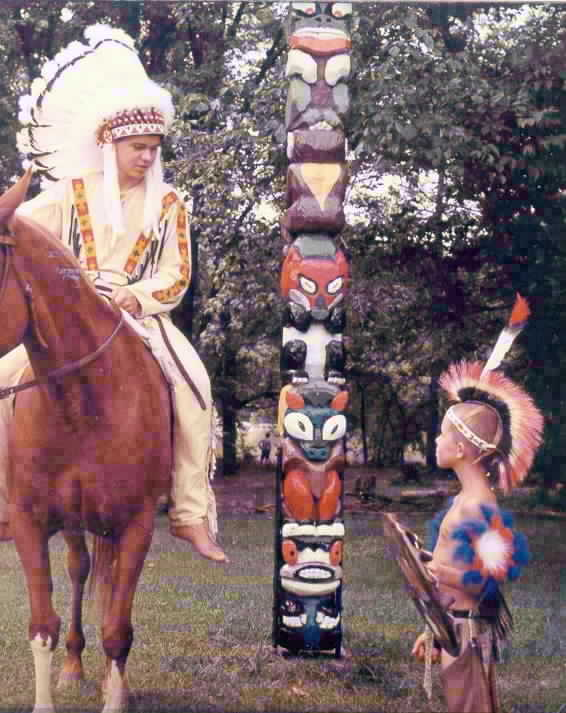
Steven Ittel and Rickie Briegel in front of the totem pole that Robert McClosky carved while he was a counselor at Camp Gard.

Robert McCloskey, who carved the camp totem pole was a famous author of children's book including Make Way for Ducklings and Lentil.

David P. Smith and his brother Tony Smith are Camp Campbell Gard Alums. David P. Smith's name still is proudly displayed on Errol's Archer's #11. The plaque is still displayed today.

Star women's basketball player Willa McKee has also attended several times.
