= Time of Wonder =

1957 picture book by Robert McCloskey

- Front cover
- Author: Robert McCloskey
- Illustrator: Robert McCloskey
- Cover artist: McCloskey
- Genre: Children's picture book
- Publisher: Viking Press
- Publication date: 1957
- Publication place: United States
- ISBN: 0-14-050201-7
- OCLC: 2968809
- Dewey Decimal: [E]
- LC Class: PZ7.M1336 Ti 1977

Time of Wonder is a 1957 children's picture book written and illustrated by Robert McCloskey that won the Caldecott Medal in 1958. The book tells the story of a family's summer on a Maine island overlooking Penobscot Bay, filled with bright images and simple alliteration. Rain, gulls, a foggy morning, the excitement of sailing, the quiet of the night, and the sudden terror of a hurricane are all expressed in this book. This was McCloskey's second Caldecott, the first being Make Way for Ducklings in 1942.

Time of Wonder was also made into an audiobook narrated by Tracy Lord and had been made into a 13-minute iconographic film narrated by Ted Hoskins, released by Weston Woods in 1961. In 2018, the film was re-made by Weston Woods with new narration by James Naughton.

== Description ==
On the cover of the book we can see a girl with her sister sailing on a small boat enjoying the sea and the landscape. This book contains 63 pages with short text and is created for children between ages 3–8. The wonders of childhood are brought to life in this Caldecott Medal award-winning story of a family's summer vacation on an island off the coast of Maine. The illustrations made by Robert McCloskey allow readers to appreciate and understand his memories and experiences of the island. Time of Wonder was also made into an audiobook narrated by Tracy Lord.

== Plot ==
This book tells readers about a family vacation in Penobscot Bay, off Maine Island. The girl describes every day as a great adventure, and how amazed she is by the forces of nature. Her time on the island is spent living in the moment, exploring the rocks which magically transform into a castle. The girl continues to explore, going under the sea and finding wonderful worlds and animals that people often do not notice. The girl describes Maine Island as a magical place where the stars at night look like a pair of eyes watching her. The girl plays with her sister and her dog enjoying the fog of the mornings and the smell of grass, as well as the power of the sheer wind brought by a hurricane that destroys everything in its way. But even after the storm, everything returns to calm, and at the end of her time on the island, she is ready to return with her family to the big city and face the routine again. In the illustrations of the book by McCloskey, the girl is always happy, playing and exploring her surrounding on Maine Island.

== Critical reception ==
Goodreads called Time of Wonder a "classic" and praised its art for being "evocative" and "vibrant".

Other book reviewers called McCloskey's work a "masterpiece". kids aboard magazine has praised Time of Wonder, calling it a "classic that belongs on every family's bookshelf.". In a retrospective essay about the Caldecott Medal-winning books from 1956 to 1965, Norma R. Fryatt wrote of Time of Wonder, "We feel a sense of wonder at these expressive pictures and of gratitude to the artist who has printed these scenes indelibly on our minds."

Awards
Preceded by A Tree is Nice	Caldecott Medal recipient 1958	Succeeded by Chanticleer and the Fox
