= Lindsay Dawson =

American painter

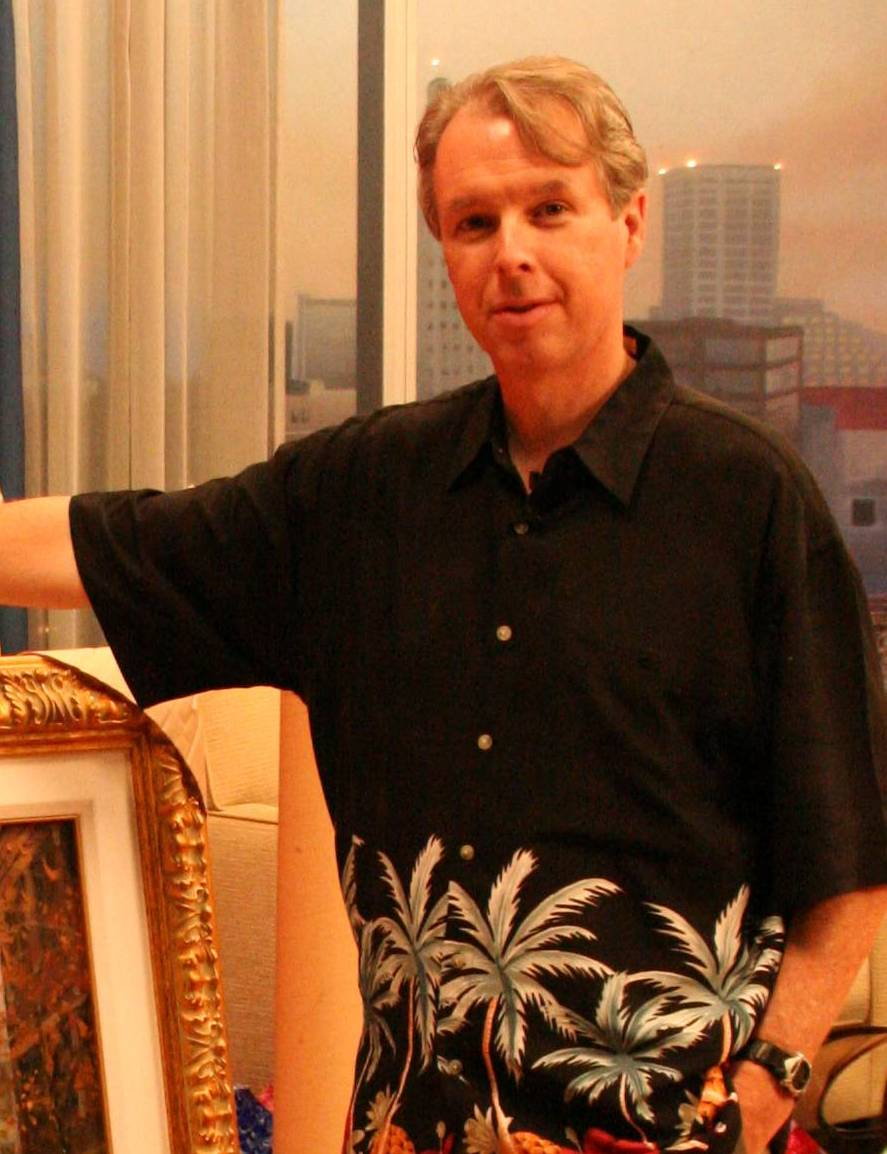
- Lindsay Dawson in December of 2007.
- Born: December 21, 1959 (age 66); Palo Alto, California, USA
- Education: Art Center College of Design
- Known for: Painting

Lindsay Dawson (born December 21, 1959, in Palo Alto, California) is an internationally collected American painter and a frequent guest on the Fine Art Showcase television show. He is best known for his idealized impressionistic paintings of women and children in beach and garden settings, and romantic (usually retrospective) Americana scenes.

== Early years ==
Dawson attended The Art Center College of Design in Pasadena, California, from 1980 to 1983. At Art Center he studied under Dan McCaw, Harry Carmean, Ted Youngkin, Eugene Fleary, and Valerie Winslow. Dawson also took extension courses at UCLA geared towards artists in which cadavers were dissected, so the artist would have complete and thorough knowledge of anatomy. After Art Center he entered the commercial art field and worked as a staff artist on He-Man and the Masters of the Universe, and She-Ra: Princess of Power (Filmation Associates, Reseda, California); G. I. Joe, Transformers, and Jem (Marvel Productions Ltd., Los Angeles, California); primarily in the layout and storyboard departments as well as Baltimore's Six Flags Power Plant theme park design (Landmark Entertainment, Hollywood, California).

== Transition years: from commercial art to fine art ==
In 1985 he was invited to have his first one-man show at the Disney Gallery (Burbank, California). He continued his commercial work alongside his Gallery work until 1991 when he joined Cottage Gallery in Carmel, California. He joined several more galleries shortly thereafter including: Waterhouse Gallery, Santa Barbara, California (1992); Joan Baker's Garden Gallery, Half Moon Bay, California (1992); and The Sunbird Gallery, Los Altos California (1994).

== National exposure ==
In 2000 he signed an exclusive worldwide contract with Marco Fine Arts, (El Segundo, California). Marco introduced the Nation to Dawson's work by publishing his original paintings as limited edition serigraphs. In addition, Dawson's art was promoted in a national tour in which it was also showcased at the New York Art Expo, Atlanta Art Expo, and San Francisco Art Expo. All of the original Marco editions have sold out.

== International exposure: original art and limited editions in demand ==
In 2002 the entire fleet of ships in the Princess Cruise Lines began exhibiting and selling Dawson's art on all their onboard art galleries, and in so doing a base of international collectors began to grow and acquire his work. In 2005 (with his international market continuing to expand) he started his affiliation with the exclusive Barry Chappell's Fine Art Showcase, a national television show that is transmitted to 50 million homes three times a week. Dawson regularly appears live on the show, and is one of only six artists that Mr. Chappell interviews on a regular basis. In addition, Dawson was one of only four artists to be featured on Master's Month two years in a row (2005 and 2006). Dawson is the only living impressionist they represent.

== Artistic style and themes ==
His paintings and prints are distinguished by his loyalty to the Impressionistic ideals, and to the American Scene Painters of the early 1900s. His subject matter is often romantic, sentimental, or nostalgic. Almost all his early paintings were of his childhood, childhood memories, or contemporary family life. Since the early nineties he has expanded his subject matter to include American genre scenes. There is also an emphasis on candid and casual moments with very little affectation. Posed and or staged subjects are avoided for the most part.

Dawson says he wants his art to offer order, clarification, focus, and escape from a chaotic world filled with conflict without resolution.

== Awards and distinctions ==
1. Appeared live for Masters Month on the Fine Art Showcase (January, 2005)
2. Appeared live for Masters Month on the Fine Art Showcase (January, 2006)
3. California Arts league Best of Show, 1991 (media/oil on canvas)
4. Gold Star, Worldfest Charleston International Film Festival, 1997 (media/film)
5. Gold CINDY, International Cinema in the Industry competition, 1997 (media/film)
6. Bemerkenswert Award, Festival Der Nationen, Austria, 1998 (media/film)
7. World Premiere, Breckenridge Festival of Film 1998 (media/film)
