= Paul McCobb =

American furniture designer (1917–1969)

- Born: June 5, 1917; Medford, Massachusetts, U.S.
- Died: March 10, 1969 (aged 51); New York City, New York, U.S.
- Occupations: furniture designer, textile designer, painter, industrial designer
- Movement: Mid-century modern
- Spouse: Mary "Mollie" Frances Rogers (m. 1955)
- Children: 2
- Parents: Raymond Winthrop McCobb (father); Winifred Leontine Caulfield (mother)

Paul Winthrop McCobb (June 5, 1917 – March 10, 1969) was an American modern furniture designer, textile designer, painter, and industrial designer.

== Early life and education ==
Paul Winthrop McCobb was born on June 5, 1917, in Medford, Massachusetts, to parents Winifred Leontine (née Caulfield) and Raymond Winthrop McCobb. His father's family was from Maine and his mother's family was from Ireland. His father was employed, as of 1920, as a men's clothing salesman. His mother was employed as a stenographer.

He knew from an early age that he wanted to be an artist, and studied drawing and painting at the Vesper George School of Art in Boston. He did not complete his course there, and enlisted in the United States Army as a Private on December 5, 1942. While enlisted in the Army, he was in the Camouflage Corps of the Army Corps of Engineers and worked as an instructor of painted scenery. He only served for a short time and was released on medical discharge for hypertension in 1943.

== Life and career ==
McCobb came to prominence as a design and decorating consultant for Martin Feinman's Modernage Furniture in New York City in 1948. While working at Modernage Furniture, McCobb met B.G. Mesberg. Mesberg and McCobb would later be business partners in the Planner and Directional furniture lines. The Planner series has become an emblem of 1950s American furniture.

In 1955, he was married to Mary "Mollie" Frances Rogers, an interior designer. Together they had two children. He taught at the Philadelphia Museum School of Art.

While he became best known for his furniture designs, McCobb also designed radios and televisions for CBS-Columbia and hi-fi consoles for Bell & Howell, along with other household items. His Planner line, manufactured by Winchendon Furniture Company, was among the best-selling contemporary furniture lines of the 1950s and was in continuous production from 1949 until 1964. McCobb's other well-known furniture lines include Predictor by O'Hearn Furniture, the Calvin Group by Calvin Furniture, Directional by Calvin Furniture, the Irwin Group by Calvin Furniture, and the Connoisseur Collection by H. Sacks and Sons.

== Death and legacy ==
McCobb had been struggling with a long illness and died in his home at 1175 York Avenue in New York City; he was 51 years old.

Since 2016, the rights to McCobb's furniture designs are managed by Form Portfolios. Form Portfolios is a Danish-American company that works with furniture manufacturers to bring back midcentury modern furniture designs.

McCobb's work can be found in public museum collections, including at Brooklyn Museum, San Francisco Museum of Modern Art, the Art Institute of Chicago, Cleveland Museum of Art, and Cooper Hewitt, Smithsonian Design Museum.

In 2021, the Johnson County Museum in Overland Park, Kansas, has held a posthumous exhibition, Paul McCobb: American Designer. This exhibit came from the collection of Samuel Hildreth.

== Awards ==
- 1950, 1951, 1953, 1958 – Good Design Award, Museum of Modern Art (MoMA), New York City, New York
- 1953 – Industrial Product Award, Hardwood Institute
- 1953, 1955, 1958 – Furniture Design Award, Hardwood Institute
- 1953 – Trail Blazer Award, Home Fashion League
- 1959 – Contributions to Better Design Award, Philadelphia Museum of Art, Philadelphia, Pennsylvania
