= One Morning in Maine =

1952 picture book by Robert McCloskey

- Front cover illustration
- Author: Robert McCloskey
- Illustrator: Robert McCloskey
- Cover artist: Robert McCloskey
- Genre: Children's picture book
- Published: 1952 The Viking Press
- Publication place: United States
- Media type: Hardback
- ISBN: 0-670-52627-4

One Morning in Maine is a picture book by Robert McCloskey set in Brooksville, Maine. It was awarded the Caldecott Honor in 1953. It features Robert McCloskey, his wife Peggy, and their two real-life daughters, Sarah ("Sal"), who had previously had appeared in Blueberries for Sal, and Jane. McCloskey was a professional illustrator and drew his wife's and daughters' facial features to accurately show what they really looked like. McCloskey also cleverly depicts the adventurously-rambunctious little Jane in his drawings of their mainland adventures; on every page, the robust tousle-headed toddler is usually shown to be exploringly bustling about independently of the two others in her group, engaged in "typical young tomboy" activities such as perching high up on a work-table, climbing on a stack of tires, snuggling with a furry puppy who has wandered into the garage, etc.

== Plot ==
The book gives a small slice of everyday life in Maine, where McCloskey and his family moved following World War II. The story begins with McCloskey's older daughter, Sal, good-naturedly assisting her little sister, Jane, during their morning routine of dressing and tooth-brushing. Sal (also the heroine of McCloskey's Blueberries for Sal; according to a 2003 interview with Jane, their father wrote this first book "so that Sal could have a little storybook that was entirely about her"; she was feeling a bit jealous when Jane was born since she now was no longer the sole focus of Daddy and Mommy's attention) finds she has a loose tooth, and worries that she won't be able to go sailing with her father. Quickly reassured by her mother, Sal then goes digging for clams with her father, and the tooth falls out and disappears in the mud, preventing Sal from using the tooth to make a wish. So instead, Sal makes her wish while holding a seagull's feather, which she views as a bird's equivalent of a tooth since they are both body parts that fall out as new ones grow in. Sal and Jane then accompany their father in his skiff to the mainland; McCloskey is obliged to row the whole way because the outboard motor has a bad spark plug. After the motor is serviced by the jovial mechanic at the local boat-shop, Sal gives the old plug to Jane to make a wish of her own; the girls reason that the plug is like the motor's tooth since it is a part that must be removed and replaced occasionally. Eventually, after doing his shopping, McCloskey treats each of his daughters to what they had both wished for: a big cone of ice cream. The story ends with the happy trio's roaring back towards home in their skiff – under motor-power this time – cleaving a great foaming wake in the calm water of the bay.

== Location ==
The action in the book takes place at the McCloskeys' summer home on Scott Island off of Little Deer Isle, and in South Brooksville on Bucks Harbor, where the buildings housing the garage and store depicted in the book can still be seen.
