= Homer Price =

Fictional character in children's books by Robert McCloskey

First edition (publ. Viking Press)

Homer Price is the central character in two children's books written and illustrated by Robert McCloskey, and title character of the first. Homer Price was published in 1943, and Centerburg Tales in 1951.

== Characters ==
Homer lives in Centerburg, Ohio. He is a mild-mannered boy who enjoys building radios, and who somehow gets involved in a series of outrageous incidents, such as tending an inexplicably unstoppable doughnut-making machine in his uncle's diner, or caring for mystery plants that turn out to be a giant form of allergy-inducing ragweed. He does odd jobs like raking leaves, and sweeping up the diner or the nearby barber shop. Sometimes he is also hired by his uncle to tend to the labor-saving devices in his cafe and mix doughnut batter. His main job is helping out in his father's business, a motor court, where Homer also resides.

James Daugherty said of Homer Price, "It is America laughing at itself with a broad and genial humanity, without bitterness or sourness or sophistication."

One of Homer Price's adventures, "The Case of the Cosmic Comic", parodies the Superman phenomenon, with Homer and his best friend Freddy attending the local personal appearance of Freddy's favorite superhero. Freddy is unable to understand that "The Super-Duper" is an ordinary actor in a costume, and expects him to be capable of super feats. Homer, however, quietly displays a more mature view of the hero.

Another adventure of Homer's is when an adult friend of his, Garrett, in Centerburg wins a contest for composing an advertising jingle for shaving lotion, but the prize money is stolen on the air in an armed robbery. By chance, the robbers are staying at the same motor court, and Homer sees it as his chance to stop them and claim a cash reward in order to build all sorts of radios and an (at the time) expensive television. Although Homer is eager to profit from the reward, he is also genuinely interested in bringing the robbers to justice, as they stole from a man he knew, recalling Garrett as “effortlessly tedious”.

Flim-flam merchants and larger-than-life paraphernalia appear in several stories. One features a snake-oil salesman—Professor Atmos P. H. Ear—offloading an odorless, colorless, tasteless chemical called "Ever-So-Much-More-So" that when sprinkled on things, supposedly enhances everything, making a soft bed softer, a fast car faster, and so on.

Many of the male residents of Centerburg share first names with classical figures; "Grandpa Hercules", "Uncle Ulysses", "Uncle Telemachus", and Homer himself.

Miss Terwilliger is a comely and likeable spinster who loves to knit. Both the sheriff and Uncle "Telly" Telemachus want to marry Miss Terwilliger, but she is unable to decide which of them she likes better. Eventually the two suitors hold a contest to see who has the largest ball of string, with the winner getting to marry Miss Terwilliger. She ends up beating them both by secretly unwinding the string in her skirt when her formal collection of string runs out, but still marries Uncle Telly, who came in second. The sheriff, however, accepts his loss with dignity, as he was best man at their wedding and they will invite him to dinner every Thursday night.

African-American characters appear in the books, portrayed benignly as ordinary citizens. During a centennial celebration of Centerburg, a chorus from the African Baptist Church provides vocal harmony for the show. A Black boy wins $100 for finding a lost bracelet inside a doughnut.

== Stories ==
=== Homer Price ===
1. "The Case of the Sensational Scent"

The first thing Homer hears upon assembling his new homemade radio is news of a robbery. He and his pet skunk meet the robbers the next day, and the encounter leads to their identification.

2. "The Case of the Cosmic Comic"

Homer and Freddy meet their comic book hero, the Super-Duper (a pastiche of Superman), when he appears in person at the Centerburg movie theater, but unintentionally learn an uncomfortable truth about him.

3. "The Doughnuts"

Uncle Ulysses installs a new doughnut maker at his lunchroom in downtown Centerburg. While his uncle is out and most of the town is at the movies, Homer is waiting on a hobo who works as a "sandwich man" in advertising and a wealthy woman who shows Homer how to make delicious doughnuts using an old family recipe of hers. However, Homer comments on the tremendous amount of batter, which makes the machine provide more than enough for everyone in town.

4. "Mystery Yarn"

Homer's Uncle Telly and the local sheriff are rivals for two things: the hand of a local widow, and the title of World's Greatest String Saver. The contest becomes a County Fair event, heightened when the widow herself enters with a ball of scrap yarn.

5. "Nothing New under the Sun (Hardly)"

A stranger with the proverbial "better mousetrap" arrives in Centerburg, offering his services to the town.

6. "Wheels of Progress"

Centerburg holds its yearly pageant, as the locals celebrate both their history and a new, modern subdivision of prefabricated houses. Each are threatened when a promised set of street signs are not posted on time, leaving the residents lost on their way home.

=== Centerburg Tales ===
1. "Grandpa Hercules"

Homer's Grandpa Herc tells stories of the frontier, including "The Hide-a-Ride", "Sparrow Courthouse", "Looking for Gold", and "The Gravitty-Bitties".

2. "Experiment 13"

Local ne'er-do-well Dulcy Dooner inherits a greenhouse from his late uncle, a famous botanist, and literally plants the seeds of trouble, when Dulcy discovers an unfinished experiment.

3. "Ever-So-Much-More-So"

A traveling salesman peddles cans of an invisible product which he guarantees will enhance one's life experiences.

4. "Pie and Punch and You-Know-Whats"

A new record on the jukebox in Uncle Ulysses's lunchroom has a song whose catchiness is such that nobody who hears it is able to stop singing. (There is a direct reference to a song with a similar effect in Mark Twain's story "A Literary Nightmare".)

== Film and television adaptations ==
1. "The Doughnuts", short subject, 1963, Weston Woods Studios
2. "The Case of the Cosmic Comic", short subject, 1976, Weston Woods Studios
3. "Homer and the Wacky Doughnut Machine", ABC Weekend Special episode, 1977, ABC Circle Films

== Bibliography ==
- Homer Price (1943) ISBN 0-14-030927-6
- Centerburg Tales (1951) ISBN 0-14-031072-X
