= Journey Cake, Ho! =

1954 Caldecott picture book

- Author: Ruth Sawyer
- Illustrator: Robert McCloskey
- Publisher: Viking
- Publication date: 1953
- Media type: Hardcover
- Pages: unpaged
- Awards: Caldecott Honor

Journey Cake, Ho! is a 1953 picture book written by Ruth Sawyer and illustrated by Robert McCloskey. The book tells the story of a boy who chases a journey cake around a farm. The book was a recipient of a 1954 Caldecott Honor for its illustrations.
