= Emily Muir =

American painter (1904–2003)

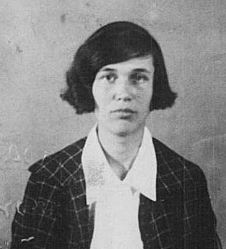
- 1924
- Born: Emily Stewart Lansingh; February 10, 1904; Chicago, Cook County, Illinois, U.S.
- Died: March 19, 2003 (aged 99); Stonington, Hancock County, Maine, U.S.
- Other name: Emily Lansingh Muir
- Occupations: Artist, architect
- Years active: 1928–2003

Emily Muir (February 10, 1904 – March 19, 2003) was an American painter, architect and philanthropist. After attending Vassar College and the Art Students League of New York, she and her husband moved to Maine in 1939. Mostly known as a portrait painter, Muir painted the official portrait of Senator Margaret Chase Smith for the Maine State House, but early in her career, she and her husband toured throughout Europe and South America painting dioramas for a steamship company. Her watercolor painting, Orchard Street, is part of the permanent collections of the Smithsonian American Art Museum and she has works in the permanent collections of the Brooklyn Museum, the Farnsworth Art Museum and the Portland Museum of Art. Self-taught as an architect, Muir designed over 45 homes in or around Crockett Cove near Stonington, Maine. As a philanthropist, she was involved in finding a permanent home for the Haystack Mountain School of Crafts in Deer Isle and donated the Crockett Cove Woods Preserve and Wreck Island to The Nature Conservancy.

== Early life ==
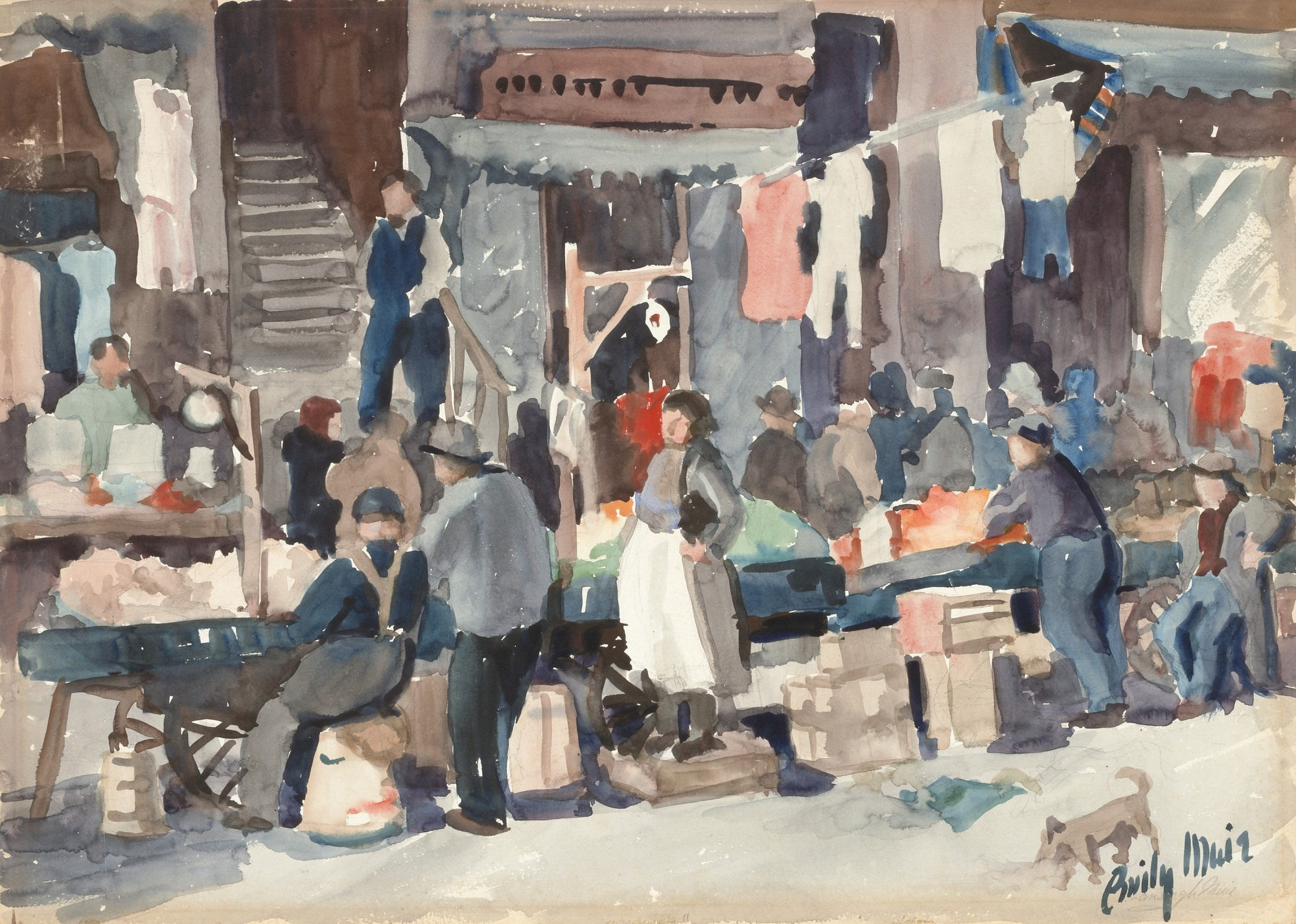
Orchard Street (1940), watercolor painting for the Section of Painting and Sculpture

Emily Stewart Lansingh was born on February 10, 1904, in Chicago, Cook County, Illinois, to Marian Lore (née Minor) and Van Rensselaer Lansingh. By her first birthday, her family had moved back to New York, where her father originated and where he worked as lighting engineer first in Yonkers and later in Brooklyn. She began studying art in high school and after graduating attended one year at Vassar College, before entering the Art Students League of New York, where she studied with Richard Lahey and Leo Lentelli. During her time at the Art League, she met William H. Muir, who would become a nationally known sculptor and whom she married in 1928.

== Career ==
Muir began her career as a portraitist and the couple often worked together. Early in their careers, they traveled throughout Europe and Latin America designing dioramas for a cruise line company, the Moore-McCormick steamship line. Her parents bought 85 acres of land at Deer Isle, Maine, and asked Muir to design a home for them there. Without any official training in architecture, she designed Mainstay, which was built by Pop Joyce, a local builder. Liking the area, in 1939, they moved to Stonington, Maine, and built a studio and their own home there in the 1940s. Later, they exhibited and toured together giving art classes on the Lyceum Circuit throughout the east coast. Muir primarily worked in oils, but occasionally produced sculpture, and many works in watercolor. In her later career, she produced many landscapes and views of the Maine coastline, reflecting her own interpretation of cubism, using space and light to create the faceting effects. Two of her most known works are a watercolor, Orchard Street, in the permanent collection of the Smithsonian American Art Museum and an official portrait of Senator Margaret Chase Smith which was painted for the Maine State House and is now in the private collection of Senator Smith.

Muir's connection with Senator Smith garnered her an appointment to the United States Commission of Fine Arts in 1955. She served on the board through 1959, simultaneously serving as a trustee at the Portland Museum of Fine Art. That same year, her husband, who was a trustee of the Haystack Mountain School of Crafts, which at the time was located in Lincoln, Maine, and had no permanent location, suggested the school move to the Stonington area. Muir helped them locate property and reestablish the school in Deer Isle. Searching for the school property, she discovered a lot on Crockett Cove and decided to buy it and build a house on it, starting a second career in architecture. She eventually designed 46 homes in the Stonington/Deer Isle area, focusing on building modern structures which worked as showcases for the landscape, rather than the dwelling. Her sensitivity to environmental concerns were recognized by a Design International award and she was given an honorary doctorate by the University of Maine in 1969.

Care of the environment was a primary concern for Muir, and when a friend asked her what she planned to do with the three islands she owned, Muir decided to donate the properties to The Nature Conservancy as a means of preserving them and preventing overdevelopment. In 1970, she sold Russ Island discounting the price, to the Island Institute. In 1975, she donated nearly 100 acres of woods to the Conservancy, now known as the Crocket Cove Woods Preserve, and donated Wreck Island to the organization, which in turn deeded the property to the Island Heritage Trust. The Island Institute founded the Emily and Willam Muir Fund to develop programs to preserve the area, provide educational opportunities, and spur community growth.

== Death and legacy ==
Muir died on March 19, 2003, in Stonington, Maine. In addition to the piece at the Smithsonian, Muir has artworks in the collections of the Brooklyn Museum, the Farnsworth Art Museum, and the Portland Museum of Art. Muir also published two books, Small Potatoes (1940) and The Time of My Life (2002), her autobiography. Her papers, as well as those of her husband, form part of the collection of the Archives of American Art and the Smithsonian.
