= Anne Carleton =

American painter

Anne Carleton (1878 – 1968) was an American painter known for her land and sea scapes.

== Early life and education ==
Anne Carleton was born in 1878 in Atkinson, New Hampshire and began studying painting in 1899 at the Massachusetts Normal Art School in Boston. Carleton spent much of her life under mentorship and in schooling for art. Following her time at the Massachusetts Normal Art School in Boston, Carleton also studied in a Design post graduate program at Vesper George School of Art in Boston, as well as under other painters at Harvard University in 1901, and Columbia Summer School of Art in 1904. Following her studies, Carleton began teaching in surrounding school districts in 1913, before studying once more at Charles Woodbury's Summer School of Drawing and Painting in Ogunquit, Maine. Some notable artists she worked with include Gertrude Fiske, Mabel May Woodward and Jane Peterson.

== Works, memberships and exhibits ==
Carleton's paintings most often were of seascapes and beach scenes in cities such as Gloucester, Rockport, Ogunquit and Portsmouth, NH. In the 1920s, Carleton exhibited at New York's Art Students League, the Copley Society, and the Boston Society of independent Artists. Carleton became a member of the Boston Society of Independent Artists, Art Students League, American Artists Professional League, Boston's Copley Society, Massachusetts Art Alumni, Marblehead Art Association, and Ogunquit Art Association. Carleton was granted a Guggenheim Fellowship but ultimately did not accept it in order to remain in Massachusetts and teach. Carleton's works can be found in countless galleries and auctions; most notably, Carleton has 6 paintings hanging in the Smithsonian American Art Museum, including Ogunquit Beach, Beach Scene, At the Beach, Light House, Girls on Ogunquit Beach, and Hot Sun, Ogunquit Beach.

== Death ==
Carleton died in 1968 in her home state of Massachusetts at the age of 90.
