= Make Way for Ducklings (sculpture) =

Sculpture by Nancy Schön

- The statues in Boston Public Garden, 2013
- Artist: Nancy Schön
- Year: 1987 (original); 1991 (copy)
- Location: Boston; Moscow
- Coordinates: 42°21′19.86″N 71°4′11.14″W

Make Way for Ducklings is a sculpture by Nancy Schön, which recreates the duck family in Robert McCloskey's children's classic Make Way for Ducklings. It is located in Boston, Massachusetts, United States.

The original set of bronze statues was installed in the Boston Public Garden in 1987, and a copy was installed in Moscow at Novodevichy Park in 1991.

== Boston ==
Make Way for Ducklings is installed in Boston Public Garden. The tallest statue stands only 38 inches (97 cm) tall, and the caravan of bronze ducks set in Boston cobblestone spans 35 feet (10.67 m) from front to back. The statue, installed October 4, 1987, was a tribute to Robert McCloskey "whose story ... has made the Boston Public Garden familiar to children throughout the world." The Make Way for Ducklings sculpture is routinely dressed in outfits throughout the year, for various Boston sports teams, for events such as the Boston Marathon, and for holidays such as Mother's Day.

The work was surveyed by the Smithsonian Institution's "Save Outdoor Sculpture!" program in 1997.

== Moscow ==
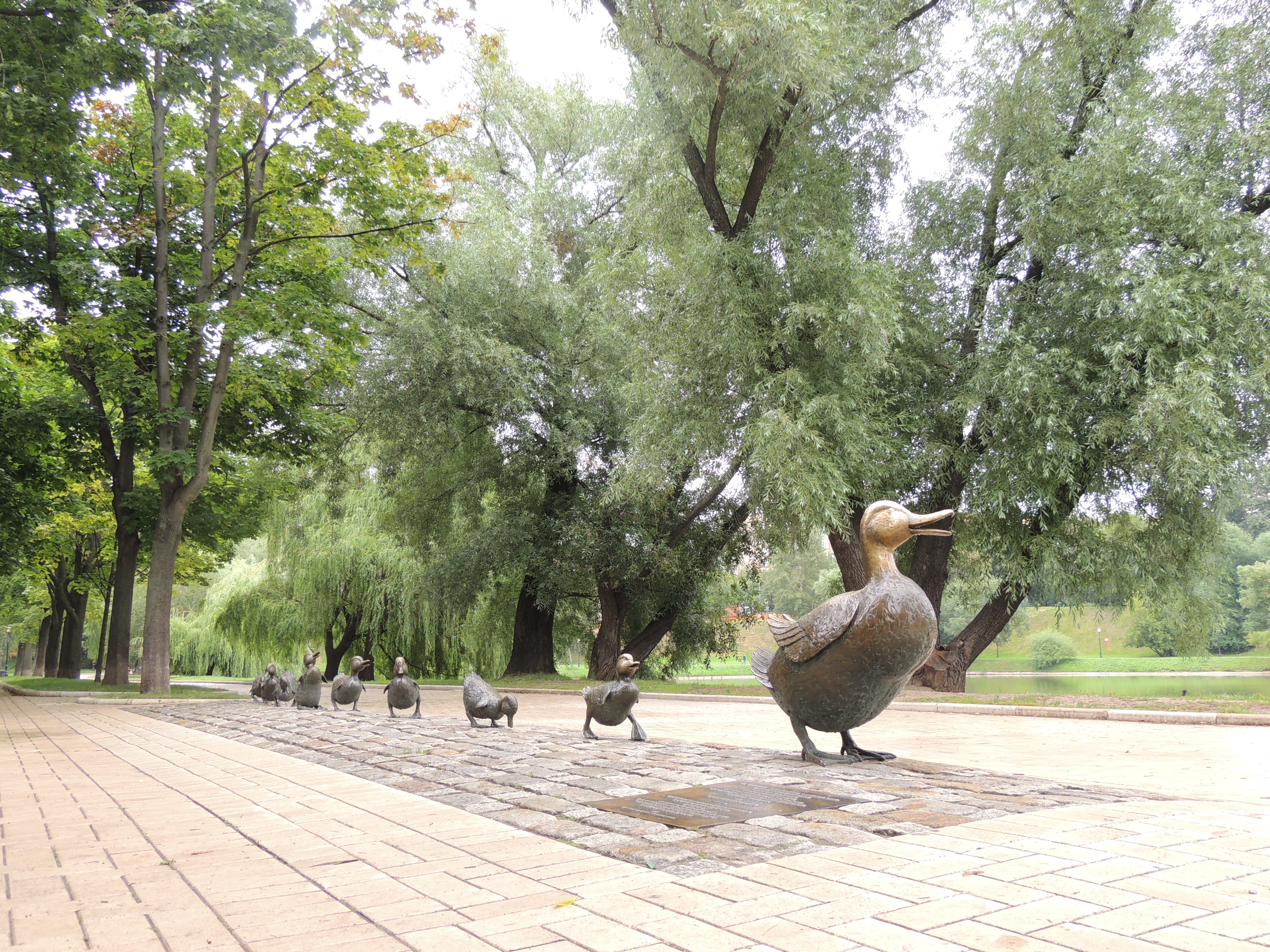
The statues in Moscow's Novodevichy park.

A sculpture, similar to the original set in the Boston Public Garden, was erected in Novodevichy Park in Moscow as part of the START Treaty by Acton, Massachusetts landscape and construction company Capizzi & Co. Inc. on July 30, 1991. The equipment, statues, cobblestones, and workers were all flown by the US Air Force in a C-5 containing the heavy equipment, diesel fuel, and other assorted tools they would need. The individual statues, which were in total length, 40 feet (12 m) long, were presented by United States First Lady Barbara Bush to Russian First Lady Raisa Gorbachev as a gift to the children of the Soviet Union. Four of the ducks were stolen, one in 1991 and three in February 2000. Thieves hoping to sell the ducks as scrap metal cut the statues off at the legs. The ducks were replaced in September 2000 at a rededication ceremony attended by former President of the Soviet Union Mikhail Gorbachev.
