= Keith Robertson (writer) =

American children's writer

- Robertson c. 1950s
- Born: May 9, 1914; Dows, Iowa, U.S.
- Died: September 23, 1991 (aged 77); Hopewell, New Jersey, U.S.
- Education: United States Naval Academy
- Occupation: Author
- Spouse: Elizabeth Woodburn Robertson
- Writing career
- Pen name: Carlton Keith
- Notable work: Henry Reed
- Notable awards: William Allen White Children's Book Award

Keith Carlton Robertson (May 9, 1914 – September 23, 1991) was an American writer of children's books and murder mysteries. He was a former captain in the United States Navy.

== Biography ==
Keith Robertson was born on May 9, 1914, in Dows, Iowa. He joined the Navy in 1931, and served as a radioman on a destroyer. Later, he attended the United States Naval Academy, graduating with a B.S. degree. He attributed his initial decision to study at the academy to a "fanatical aversion to washing dishes." He said, "When I discovered that midshipmen at the United States Naval Academy did not wash dishes but were gentlemen by act of Congress, I promptly applied for entrance." Robertson served in World War II as captain of a destroyer. He was awarded five battle stars. He retired from the service as a captain in the United States Naval Reserve.

Robertson published his first book, Ticktock and Jim, in 1948. His writing career spanned 40 years. As a member of the Rutgers University Council on Children's Literature, he was active in encouraging aspiring authors.

He was married to Elizabeth Woodburn Robertson, a rare-book dealer, and had four children. He died of cancer at his home in Hopewell, New Jersey on September 23, 1991, aged 77.

== Writing career ==
Keith Robertson is best known for the five books of the Henry Reed series, beginning in 1958 with Henry Reed, Inc., which won the William Allen White Children's Book Award in 1961. Another Henry Reed book, Henry Reed's Baby-Sitting Service, also won this award, along with the Pacific Northwest Library Association Young Readers' Choice Award, in 1969. The Henry Reed series was illustrated by Robert McCloskey.

Keith Robertson used the pseudonym Carlton Keith for his six murder mysteries.

== Series books ==
Ticktock and Jim series

- Ticktock and Jim a.k.a. Watch for a Pony (1948)
- Ticktock and Jim, Deputy Sheriffs (1949)

The Neil and Swede series AKA the Carson Street Detective Agency series

- The Mystery of Burnt Hill (1952)
- Three Stuffed Owls (1954)
- The Crow and the Castle (1957)
- The Money Machine (1969)

The Sourland Mountain series AKA the John Michelson series

- Outlaws of the Sourland (1953)
- The Pinto Deer (1956)

The Henry Reed series

- Henry Reed, Inc. (1958)
- Henry Reed's Journey (1963)
- Henry Reed's Baby-Sitting Service (1966)
- Henry Reed's Big Show (1970)
- Henry Reed's Think Tank (1986)
- The Adventures of Henry Reed omnibus (1982)

== Standalone novels ==
- The Dog Next Door (1950)
- The Missing Brother: A Mystery Story for Older Boys (1950)
- The Lonesome Sorrel (1952)
- Mascot of the Melroy (1953)
- Wreck of the Saginaw (1954)
- Ice to India (1955)
- The Phantom Rider (1955)
- The Pilgrim Goose (1956)
- If Wishes Were Horses (1958)
- The Year of the Jeep (1968)
- In Search of a Sandhill Crane (1972)
- Tales of Myrtle the Turtle (1974)

== Non-fiction books ==
- The Navy: From Civilian to Sailor (U.S. Armed Services Library) (1958)
- New Jersey (States of the Nation series) (1968)

== Carlton Keith books ==
- The Diamond-Studded Typewriter a.k.a. A Gem of a Murder (1958)
- Missing, Presumed Dead (1961)
- Rich Uncle (1963)
- The Hiding Place (1965)
- The Crayfish Dinner a.k.a. The Elusive Epicure (1966)
- A Taste of Sangria a.k.a. The Missing Book-keeper (1968)
