= Romeo and Juliet (swans) =

Homosexual swan couple

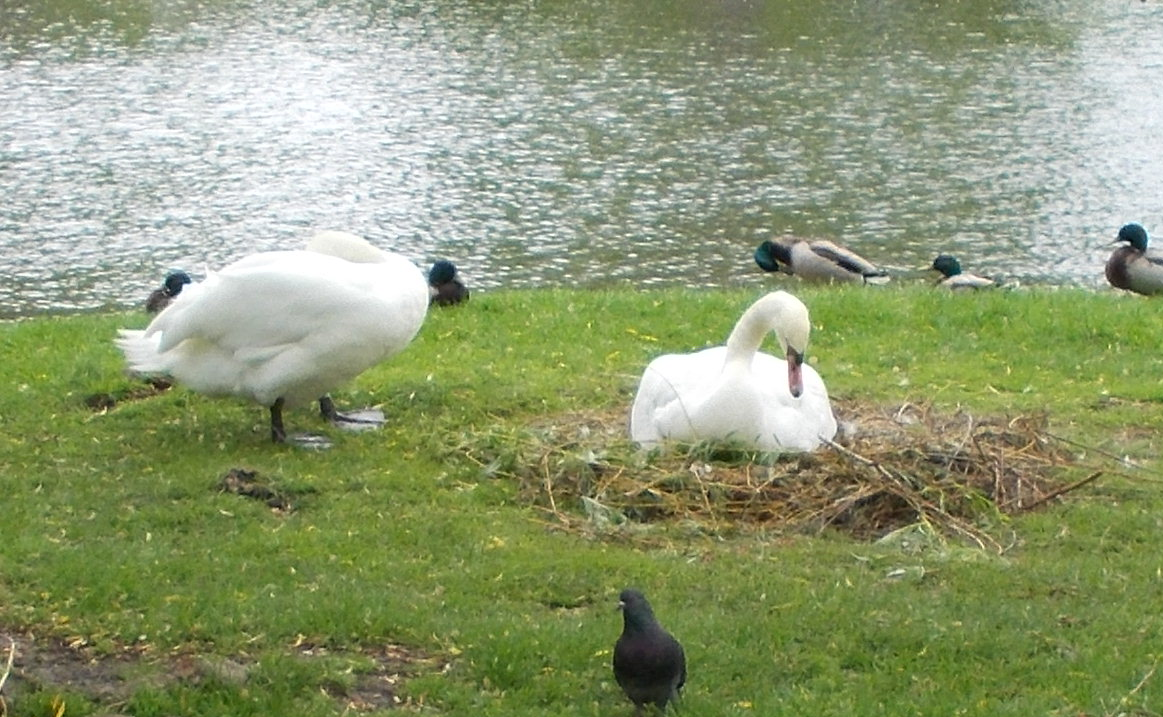
A nesting of swans in the Boston Public Garden

Romeo and Juliet are a pair of female mute swans that previously resided in the pond of the Public Garden of Boston, Massachusetts, United States, during the spring and summer months. Despite being named after the Shakespearean romance, the two swans have been referred to as being lesbian by the news media, as they are notable for being a same-sex couple.

The same two swans were introduced yearly to the Public Garden since 2003, but were not discovered to both be female until 2005, shortly after same-sex marriage in Massachusetts was legally recognized. The swans were obtained from a breeder who had informed the city's Parks and Recreation Department that both were female and would thus be a good fit for the Public Garden due to concerns of aggressive behavior in males. Park rangers had assumed that the breeder mistakenly provided a male swan when the pair began exhibiting parenting behavior. The birds were confirmed to both be female after they underwent testing due to infertile eggs being produced for two years prior; there was initial hesitancy to reveal the results due to public perception. Dr. Frank Beall, general curator of Zoo New England, stated that the pair demonstrates behavior observed in heterosexual swans that have mated for life, such as building nests, incubating their eggs and protecting their territory together.

The swans resided at the Franklin Park Zoo during the winter months and were reintroduced to the Public Garden during the annual Return of the Swans celebration, as of 2019. The event is held during the spring and includes entertainment programming for families, which includes a reading of the 1941 children's book Make Way for Ducklings, and has historically been attended by the city's mayor. The swans are escorted to the garden's pond by a parade and brass band and then released into the water during the ceremony. The swans have not been reintroduced to the pond in more recent years.

Boston Legacy FC, the city's professional women's soccer team, unveiled their crest redesign in June 2025; it included a swan which serves as a nod to the pair.

== See also ==
- List of birds displaying homosexual behavior
