= Gale Fulton Ross =

African-American visual artist (born 1947)

- Born: 1947 (age 78–79); Medford, Massachusetts, U.S.
- Education: Massachusetts College of Art and Design
- Known for: Painting; portraiture; printmaking; sculpture

Gale Fulton Ross is an African-American visual artist who lives in Sarasota, Florida. Primarily a painter, she also practices portraiture, printmaking, and sculpture.

== Life ==
Gale Fulton Ross was born in Medford, Massachusetts, in 1947, the oldest of nine children.

She studied at the Massachusetts College of Art in Boston, where she explored a wide variety of styles and media including sculpture. She continued her art education at the California College of Arts and Crafts in San Francisco, concentrating in the study of Fine Arts and art history. In addition to formal academic training she has studied under the guidance of established artists, including Melvin Johnson, at the Vesper George School of Art, Boston; Cleveland Bellow, of the DeYoung Museum, Oakland California; and Pierre Parsus, of France, while a resident at the La Napoule Art Foundation.

Initially trained as an art curator, Fulton Ross traveled extensively throughout Africa, Europe, and as far east as China, in order to study and paint. In 1984, she was an artist in residence in Bellagio, Italy and produced an exhibition for the Rockefeller Foundation in Bellagio, and in 1993 was the recipient of an award to work and study in the People's Republic of China.

She developed a reputation early in her career as a portrait artist, and has created likenesses of Archbishop Desmond Tutu, Justice Thurgood Marshall, A. Philip Randolph, Arthur Ashe, and Governor Michael Dukakis, among others. In 2009, she was selected to paint a portrait of Lord Andrew Lloyd Webber.

== Philosophy ==
Fulton Ross has cited several classical artists as influences on her work, including Michelangelo, Da Vinci, and Rembrandt, as well as modern-day African-American masters such as Charles Wilbert White, Elizabeth Catlett, Beauford Delaney, and Samella Lewis. Her style incorporates both the figurative and the abstract, as reflected in her eclectic creations. She believes that artists are the humanistic conscience of a materialistic society. Her visual expressions most often depict poignant images of people, especially African American women, reflecting her philosophy that it is the depth and variety of human feelings that motivates art, and indeed, that she must become a more sensitive human in order to be a better artist.

In that regard, she has dedicated considerable time to mentoring and creating opportunities for younger artists as the founder of the Fulton-Ross Fund for Visual Artists of Sarasota County, which provides a supportive environment and awards competitive grants to those just beginning their careers.

== Awards ==
- Work Study Project, People's Republic of China, Summer 1993;
- Fellowship, La Napoule Art Foundation (France), Winter 1990;
- Atlanta Life Painters Award, 1990;
- Winner-Best of show 1994, Bay Area African American Florida Competition;
- West Coast Center for Human Development, 1996 Humanitarian Award;
- National Coalition of 100 Black Women, Arts & Humanity Award, Pennsylvania, 1992;
- Highest Achiever, Women’s History Month Competition, Tempo Magazine, Sarasota, March 2008.

== Collections ==
- National Museum of Women in the Arts, Washington, D.C.
- University of Maryland, David C. Driskell Center, College Park, MD
- Bennett College, Greensboro, NC

== Exhibitions ==
- Hell, Purgatory, and Paradise
- Charles H. Wright Museum, Detroit, Michigan Jan-May 2011
- Beyond the Border, San Diego, California, September 2009
- Ain’t I a Woman Too?!, Greenboro Cultural Center, Greenboro, North Carolina, March 2005
- Edge, G.R. N’Namdi Gellery, Detroit, Michigan, June 2004
- Earth N' Arts Gallery, Oakland, California 1971-1976
- Rainbow Sign, Berkeley, California Black Contributions, 1972
- Black Expo, San Francisco, 1972
- Child with Basket, Oakland Museum, 1971
- California State Fair Competition, 1971
- Print Show, M.I.X. Program San Francisco, California Museum of Art, 1973
- Governor's Office, State of California, 1975 Group
- Second World Festival of Black and African Arts and Culture, Lagos, Nigeria 1977
- The Gallery, Los Angeles, California, November 1978
- Museum of the National Center for Afro American Artists, Prints and Drawings, 1980
- Dignity, Brockman Gallery, Los Angeles, California, 1984
- Private Exhibitions for the Center of Visual Arts, Los Angeles, California, and New York City 1985
- Foxworth Productions, Los Angeles California, 1985
- California African Museum, Los Angeles, California, 1986 Artist in Residence
- Cousen Rose Gallery, Boston, Massachusetts, 1987-1989
- University of Massachusetts Boston, One Woman Retrospective, Boston Campus 1989
- Moods, Blues, Beatitudes 1989
- Moods and Nudes One Woman Exhibition
- Soul of New York, D. Christian James Gallery
- One-Woman Show, Governor's Office, Boston, Massachusetts, 1988-1989
- Bureau of Cultural Affairs, Atlanta/France 1990
- One Woman Show, National Council of Churches Headquarters, New York City, Jan-Feb 1991
- Emerging Artist Group Show
- Museum of African American Art, Los Angeles, California, May–June 1991
- Nudes, Castillion Fine Art, New York City, May–June 1991, One Woman Show
- Zora Neal Hurston Museum, September 1994, Solo Exhibition
- Parrish Gallery, Washington, D.C., December 1994
- Forbes Gallery, New York City, 1994
- Monique Knowlton Gallery, New York City, 1994, Solo Exhibition
- Philadelphia AA Historical and Cultural Museum, 1995
- Don Roll Gallery, Sarasota, Florida, February 1995, One Woman Show
- African American Museum, Tampa, Florida, October 1995, One Woman Show
- United States Department of Health and Human Services Art Gallery, Washington, D.C., 1996
- Pennsylvania State University, 1996
- Chuck Leviton Gallery, New York, City, 1996
- Tampa City Center, Tampa Florida
- Francesca Anderson Gallery, Lexington, Massachusetts
- Sarasota Center for the Visual Arts, Sarasota, Florida 1997
- SoBo Fine Art, Tulsa, Oklahoma, February 1999
- Art Jaz Gallery, Philadelphia, October 1999
- Shamwari Gallery, Oakland, California 2000
- My Museum, multimedia interactive installation,
  Ringling Museum of Art, Sarasota, Florida, October 1999 – 2000
- Mural A tribute to Artist Romare Bearden, 2000

== Commissioned works ==
- James Cash Jr.
- Justice Thurgood Marshall
- Archbishop Desmond Tutu
- Congressman Ronald Dellums
- Ambassador Bradley Holmes
- Governor Michael Duckakis
- Mayor Andrew Young
- J. Bruce Llewellyn
- James Baldwin, University of Massachusetts
- Ambassador, Franklin Williams
- Jackie Robinson for Ms. Rachel Robinson
- Dr. Arthur Logan for Mrs. Marian Logan
- A. Philip Randolph
- Byard Rustin
- Governor L. Douglas Wilder
- James Gilliam Sr., Metropolitan Wilmington Urban League
- James Gilliam Jr.
- President R. William David, Council of Churches
- Bronze, Charles Hamilton Huston, North Carolina University, Sarasota Memorial Hospital Pediatrics Dept.
- Arthur Ashe for the Arthur Ashe Foundation
- Selected as Feature Artist, Sarasota Magazine, December 1995
- Law Office of Rosen & Shapiro, Sarasota, Florida
- Law Office of Shaffer Zapson, New York City
- Premier African American Painter, Jacob Lawrence and his wife, Artist Gwen Knight
- San Francisco General Hospital -Permanent Collection, 1978
- Forbes Gallery, Absolut Vodka Ad Campaign
- 100 Black Women, Boston, Massachusetts
- National Organization of Black Law Enforcement Officers, Washington, D.C.
