= Haystack Mountain School of Crafts =

Historic place in Deer Isle, Maine

- U.S. National Register of Historic Places
- Location within Maine Location within the United States
- Location: 89 Haystack School Dr; Deer Isle, Maine
- Coordinates: 44°11′18″N 68°35′03″W
- Built: 1961
- Architect: Edward Larrabee Barnes
- Architectural style: Modernist
- Website: www.haystack-mtn.org
- NRHP reference No.: 05001469
- Added to NRHP: December 23, 2005

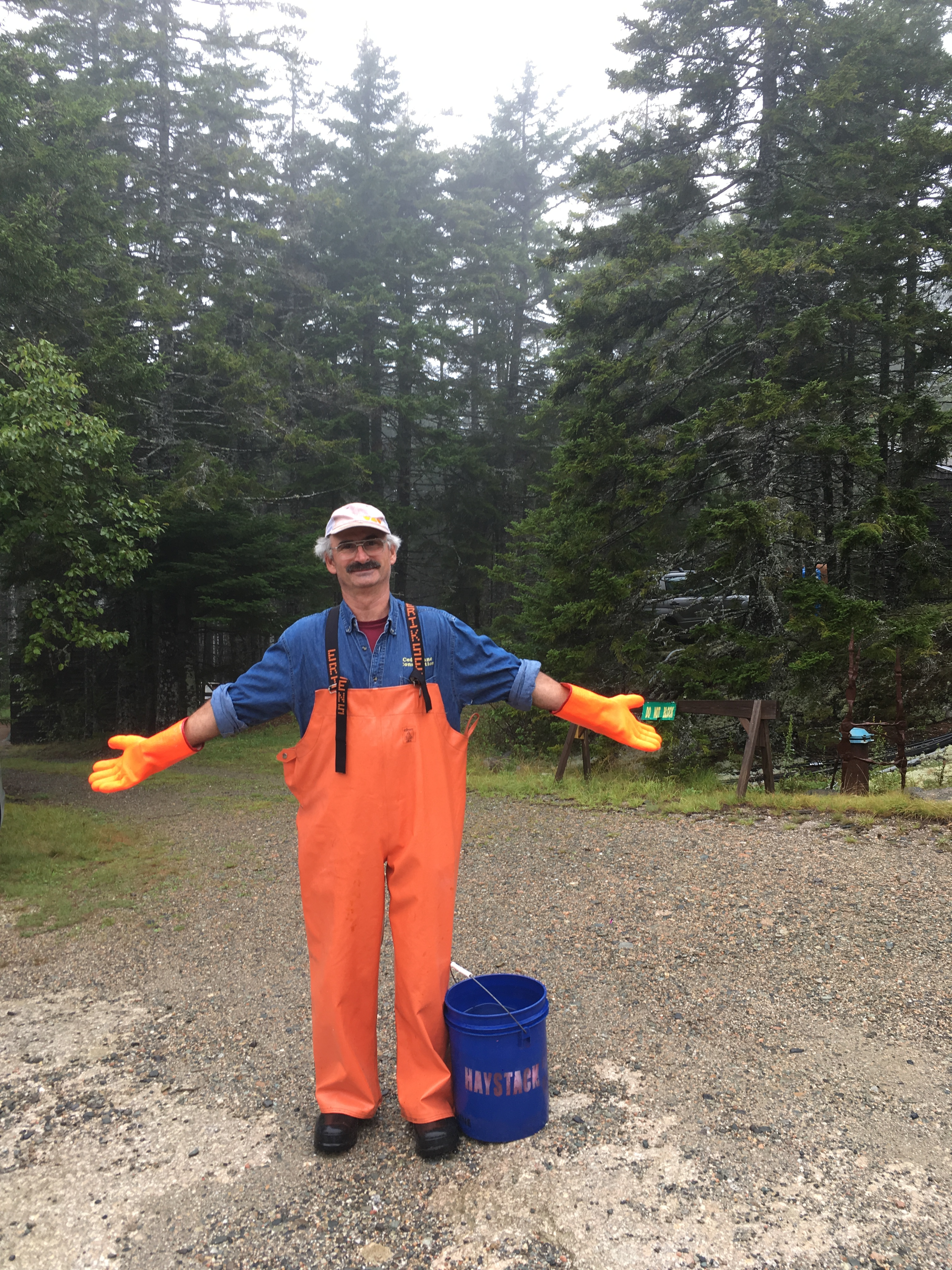
Facilities Director Walter Kumiega, dressed for success on the Haystack campus in 2019.

Haystack Mountain School of Crafts, commonly called "Haystack," is a craft school located at 89 Haystack School Drive on the coast of Deer Isle, Maine.

== History ==
Haystack was founded in 1950 by a group of craft artists in the Belfast, Maine area, with support from Mary Beasom Bishop. The first director of Haystack was Francis Sumner Merritt, whose wife Priscilla Merritt was also an administrator. It took its name from its original location near Haystack Mountain, in Montville, Maine. The school was located in Montville/Liberty, Maine through 1960, but when it became clear that it needed to move, Mary B. Bishop asked one of its trustees, artist William H. Muir to find a place to move to the Maine coast. Muir and his wife Emily found a property on Deer Isle, which Bishop purchased to facilitate building a permanent location. In 1961 the school was moved to its current campus on Deer Isle.

The campus and buildings were designed by architect Edward Larrabee Barnes, and consists of 34 buildings clustered onto 8 acres (3.2 ha) of the more than 40-acre (16 ha) campus property, located on Stinson's Neck, an appendage extending southeast from the main part of the island of Deer Isle. The buildings were designed by Barnes to fit well within their environment, and to provide views of the surrounding land- and seascape. In 1994, the school campus won the "Twenty-five Year Award" from the American Institute of Architects. The award is given to a structure (or in this case, several structures) whose construction and original intent have withstood the test of time. The school was honored again in 2005 when the campus was added to the National Register of Historic Places.

Since 2004, the school has published a quarterly newspaper, Haystack Gateway. In 2016, Craft in America included Haystack in its list of significant craft places in America.

In 2019, curators Rachael Arauz and Diana Greenwold organized In the Vanguard: Haystack Mountain School of Crafts 1950-1969, a major exhibition and scholarly catalogue addressing the school's early history.

Also in 2019, Alana VanDerwerker, an independent scholar, Maine artist, art teacher, and student of the school in the 1970s, wrote a historical account of Haystack titled Haystack at Liberty. This book was based on numerous archival letters and personally conducted interviews with Francis Sumner Merritt and many of the earliest participants of Haystack, including Edward L, Barnes, Jack Lenor Larsen, and the sister of Mary Beasom Bishop.

== About ==
Haystack offers summer workshops of one to three weeks in blacksmithing, clay, fibers, glass, graphics, metals, and wood. The school has no permanent faculty; the workshops are taught by visiting professors and artists from around the United States. Since 2012, Haystack has operated an annual two-week artist residency (supported by funding from the Windgate Charitable Foundation) during which artists may move among studios and receive technical assistance. Haystack does not award academic degrees, although credit for their workshops can be earned through Maine College of Art & Design and the University of Southern Maine.

In addition to offering traditional tools and facilities for crafts, Haystack is a member of MIT's Fab Lab network.

== See also ==
- National Register of Historic Places listings in Hancock County, Maine
- Fab Lab
