= Henry Reed (character) =

Character in children's novels by Keith Robertson

Henry Reed is the main character and narrator of a series of five children's novels by Keith Robertson. The first four novels were illustrated by Robert McCloskey but he declined to handle the last one because production of the fourth disappointed him deeply. It was published in 1986 without any illustrations but the dustjacket by Gail Owens.

Four of the five novels share a similar premise: Henry, the son of an American diplomat, lives abroad with his parents. He spends summer vacation with his aunt and uncle in the small town of Grover's Corner, New Jersey, where his mother grew up. (Uncle Al is Henry's mother's brother.) Henry is a serious, entrepreneurial boy, and most of the books concern his efforts to earn money by starting some kind of business. All of the novels are told as a series of Henry's journal entries recounting his day-by-day adventures throughout the summer. As he explains in his first book, his journal is not a diary.

Margaret "Midge" Glass, a year younger than Henry, is the only person in the neighborhood close to his age. She becomes his friend and business partner throughout the series. Midge is somewhat tomboyish and more spontaneous and free-spirited than Henry, which he sometimes finds annoying. Their relationship sometimes resembles a screwball comedy minus the romance.

In all of the books, events spiral out of control, leading to chaotic and humorous misadventures. Henry and Midge are usually the unintentional cause of these adventures, although they're not deliberately mischievous.

== Henry Reed books ==
In the first book, Henry Reed, Inc. (November 7, 1958, paperback reissue ISBN 0-14-034144-7), 13-year-old Henry meets his aunt Mabel and uncle Al; adopts a stray beagle, Agony; and makes friends with Midge. Henry turns an old family barn into the headquarters for Henry Reed, Inc., a research service. Henry attempts to make money by drilling for oil, hunting for truffles, and experimenting with a homemade weather balloon, among other efforts. His main foils throughout the book are Mr. and Mrs. Apple, who live in the house next door and have an extreme aversion to anyone entering their yard.

The second book in the series, Henry Reed's Journey (January 1, 1963, paperback reissue ISBN 0-14-034145-5), is the only one not set in Grover's Corner. Instead, Henry meets Midge and her parents in San Francisco, California, and they drive across the United States to New Jersey.

The third book, Henry Reed's Baby-Sitting Service (April 20, 1966, paperback reissue ISBN 0-14-034146-3), is set during the same summer. Henry and Midge decide to become baby-sitters. The Apples have moved away, so Henry and Midge have to deal with the older, disdainful children who moved in next door.

Henry Reed's Big Show (October 30, 1970, paperback reissue ISBN 0-440-43570-6), the fourth book, involves Henry and Midge's efforts to become showbiz entrepreneurs.

In Henry Reed's Think Tank (1986, paperback reissue ISBN 0-440-40104-6), the fifth book, Henry and Midge return to their roots and set up a think tank to help solve the problems of Grover's Corner residents. This book is set just after the events of Big Show. This is the only book in which Robertson reverts Henry's age — he had gone from 13 to 15 in the previous books, but Robertson makes him 13 again in this novel, presumably to keep him interesting for the younger readers for whom the books were written.

== Awards ==
- Henry Reed, Inc. received the William Allen White Children's Book Award in 1961
- Henry Reed's Baby-Sitting Service received the William Allen White Children's Book Award and the Pacific Northwest Library Association Young Reader's Choice Award in 1969

Both annual awards are administered by public library systems and judged by schoolchildren.

== See also ==
- Epistolary novel
