= Sam Petrucci =

American artist (1926–2013)

- Sam Petrucci at GIJoeCon 2009 (Kansas City, Missouri).
- Born: December 22, 1926; Medford, Massachusetts, U.S.
- Died: September 27, 2013 (aged 86); Scranton, Pennsylvania, U.S.
- Education: Vesper George School of Art
- Occupations: Radio operator; illustrator; designer; painter
- Years active: 1960s–1994
- Spouse: Leona Petrucci (m. 19?? – 2008)
- Children: 5 (Maureen Beaupre, Ken Petrucci, Lisa Petrucci, Linda Petrucci, Steven Petrucci)
- Website: sampetrucci.com

Sam Petrucci (December 22, 1926 – September 27, 2013) was an American artist, known for his uncredited box art for the original G.I. Joe figures. He also created The Land of Ta stickers for Dennison.

== Personal life ==
Sam Petrucci was born in Medford, Massachusetts, on December 22, 1926, to Salvatore and Mary Petrucci (née Dunn). He worked as a bellhop at the Ritz Carlton as a teenager. Petrucci joined the U.S. Navy at the age of 16; he became a radio operator on the USS Willard Keith.

After World War II, he studied art at Vesper George School of Art in Boston. He married Leona Petrucci and together they had five children: Maureen, Ken, Lisa, Linda, and Steven. Leona Petrucci died in 2008.

== Career ==
Petrucci's career as an artist began in the 1960s. His early work was for the Hassenfeld Brothers Toy Company (Hasbro) where he illustrated board games for Superman, The Mighty Hercules, and The Banana Splits. He also illustrated the packaging for Mr. Potato Head.

A 1978 Lassie lunchbox he designed for Thermos is displayed at the National Museum of American History of the Smithsonian Institution. He did design work on the team yearbooks for the Red Sox and Boston Bruins in the 1960s and 1970s.

Petrucci founded two design studios: Thresher & Petrucci followed by Sam Petrucci & Associates.

He later worked for Gunn Associates in Boston where he designed packaging and company logos for at least 25 years.

In 1981, Petrucci did the artwork for Advanced Dungeons & Dragons rub-down transfers produced by FNR International Corp. He retired in 1994.

=== G.I. Joe ===
Petrucci designed the original logo and box art for Hasbro's G.I. Joe action figure toy line in 1964. According to his Gunn Associates colleague John Filosi, Petrucci turned down Hasbro stock and accepted a flat payment for his art.

Petrucci was a regular guest at G.I. Joe conventions. He attended GIJoeCon in 2009 and 2011.

In 2002, he appeared in G.I. Joe Documentary: The Story of America's Movable Fighting Man and created the original cover art for the documentary.

=== Design and logos ===
Petrucci designed packaging and logos for numerous companies, including Charleston Chew, Ocean Spray, Veryfine, Gillette, Newport, Titleist, Marshmallow Fluff, Converse, Polaroid, TJ Maxx, Prince Spaghetti, Salada tea, Bose, BASF, the World Wildlife Fund, Friendly's, Poland Spring, Smokey Bear, Sunkist, Dunkin' Donuts, Gorton's Fishsticks, the Massachusetts Lottery, Venus Crackers, Jose Cuervo, Boston College, Harvard University, Liberty Mutual, and Hewlett-Packard

=== The Land of Ta ===
The Land of Ta sticker sheet including Geedis

Petrucci did regular artwork for stickers produced by the Dennison Manufacturing Company. This included sticker sheets for spaceships, cartoon baby animals, holiday stickers.

One of these was The Land of Ta, a short-lived series of fantasy stickers produced by Dennison in 1981 to 1982. The first two sticker sheets titled The Land of Ta (1981) were illustrated and painted by Petrucci, who was not credited. Sheet #80-218 featured original characters named Zoltan, Harry, Iggy, Tokar, Geedis, and Erik. Sheet #80-219 featured six more original characters: Hermann, Eris, Uno, Shimra, Radon, and Stefan. An unknown artist illustrated the third sticker sheet (#80-224) titled Women of Ta (1982); it featured female characters named Cecily, Astrid, Sybil, Amneris, Ursula, and Rimelda.

In 1990, Dennison merged with Avery International Corporation and became Avery Dennison. In 2014, the Framingham History Center in Framingham, Massachusetts, opened an exhibition about Dennison after receiving the archives from Avery Dennison. This included The Land of Ta sticker sheets.

==== Geedis ====
Geedis is a bear-like creature with a pig nose, horns, and yellow eyes included on the first Land of Ta sticker sheet.

Geedis became an Internet meme in 2017 when comedian Nate Fernald discovered an enamel pin of the character on eBay and tweeted on June 21:

Nate Fernald
(@natefernald)
tweeted:

What the fuck is Geedis? I found this old pin. Google has no answers. Please help. I'm losing my mind.

June 21, 2017

On August 1, a scan of The Land of Ta sticker sheet that included Geedis was rediscovered on a Flickr page. Speculation about the pins and stickers being merchandise for a wider media franchise grew but no further information about The Land of Ta or the identity of the artist was available on the Internet. Fernald bought upwards of 80 Geedis pins from the eBay seller and posted a video of his pin collection to his Facebook page on December 1, 2017.

On Reddit, the subreddit r/Geedis was created on September 4, 2017, and became dedicated to solving the origins of Geedis. A June 3, 2019 post on r/UnresolvedMysteries and a subsequent June 8 comment on an r/AskReddit thread caused the r/Geedis subreddit to increase from 250 subscribers to over 15,000 subscribers.

The Reddit-focused WBUR-FM podcast Endless Thread discovered the Geedis mystery from the growing r/Geedis subreddit. In their August 23 episode "Geedis: An Internet Mystery For The Ages... Gets Solved!", co-hosts Amory Sivertson and Ben Brock Johnson interviewed Nate Fernald, r/Geedis Redditors, Framingham History Center staff, and former Dennison staff. The duo contacted former Dennison Art Director Tom Manguso and his son Bill recognized the Land of Ta stickers as the work of Sam Petrucci. Petrucci was a coworker of Bill Manguso at Gunn Associates and a peer of Tom Manguso at school. Tom Manguso was the one who brought in Petrucci to work for Dennison.

Sivertson and Johnson discovered the 2013 obituary for Sam Petrucci and successfully contacted all five of his children. They met with Linda Petrucci in New Hampshire at the family lake house that was designed by her father. There they saw much of his original artwork, including the pencil sketches titled The Fantasy Land and the final mounted artwork for The Land of Ta, which included his signature.

In the interview, former Dennison General Manager Lou D'Amaro recalled a coworker regularly used the term "geetus" as slang for money, giving a possible origin to the name "Geedis". Former staff members on a Dennison Alumni Facebook page claimed Dennison never produced enamel pins. The creator of the Geedis pins remains unknown.

== Death ==
Sam Petrucci died of natural causes on September 27, 2013, in Scranton, Pennsylvania.

== See also ==
- List of American artists
- List of graphic designers
- List of illustrators
- List of people from Massachusetts
- List of people from Pennsylvania
