= Francis Scott Bradford =

American muralist (1898–1961)

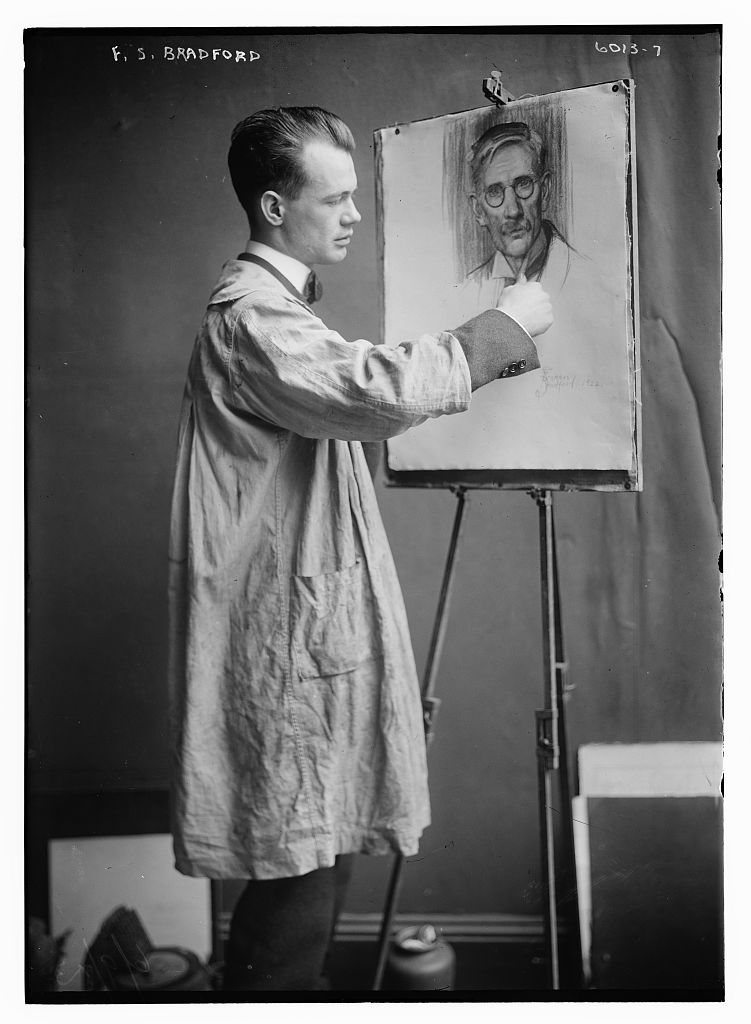
- Bradford c. 1920
- Born: August 17, 1898; Appleton, Wisconsin
- Died: October 1, 1961 (aged 63); Cornwall Bridge, Connecticut
- Occupation: muralist

Francis Scott Bradford Jr. (August 17, 1898 – October 1, 1961) was an American painter known for his mural paintings.

== Career ==
Bradford was born in Appleton, Wisconsin, to lawyer Francis Scott Bradford Sr. and Effie Stevens Bradford. He studied law at Lawrence College but left to become a soldier when World War I began. He said "I grew up in an atmosphere not very conducive to the bringing out of any artistic taste ... I would no doubt have studied law and entered my father’s firm but for the war." He became a Second Lieutenant and went to France with the 41st Infantry Division where he visited cathedrals and art galleries. Upon his return, he studied art at the American Academy of Art and Design in New York City and earned the Prix de Rome in 1923 allowing him to study art for four years in Europe where he learned to paint frescoes.

He became known for his mural work primarily in the 1930s. He painted several murals in Wisconsin, notably a fresco mural in the Outagamie County courthouse (now the Outagamie County Administration Building) and a 25-section oil mural consisting of 24 three-by-seven-foot panels in the Milwaukee County courthouse. He also created a 2300 square foot mural dedicated to the men of the Eight and Ninth Air Forces who died in World War II, in the chapel in the American military cemetery in Cambridge, England. For the 1939 New York World's Fair, he created a series of ten large murals on the outside of the Consumers Building. He painted six murals in the lobby of MIT's Sloan School in 1939, assisted by Robert McCloskey, which depict contemporary scenes of Boston and Cambridge.

Lawrence College presented him with an honorary doctorate in 1932. He was the president of the American Academy in Rome in the 1940s.

== Personal life ==
Bradford married the ceramicist Thelma Sylvia Saks (later, Thelma S. B. Ingersoll) on April 2, 1935, in New York City. He died of a heart attack in Cornwall Bridge, Connecticut. His papers are held by the Archives of American Art at the Smithsonian.
