= Vesper George School of Art =

Former art school in Boston, Massachusetts

Coordinates: 42°20′46.67″N 71°4′46.44″W

Location
- 44 Saint Botolph Street, Boston, Massachusetts, 02116, U.S.

Information
- School type: art school
- Established: 1924
- Founder: Vesper Lincoln George
- Status: closed
- Closed: 1983 (aged 58–59)

The Vesper George School of Art was a school in Boston, Massachusetts, United States, founded in 1924 and closed in 1983.

== History ==
The school namesake and founder was Vesper Lincoln George (1865–1934) a painter, born in Boston. The campus had been located at 44 Saint Botolph Street in Boston, Massachusetts.

For many years the school contributed to the Boston art community, training many talented artists, many of whom are still active in both commercial art and fine arts. In addition to training artists, it served to allow many artists to maintain a living as instructors while they were building their careers.

== Alumni ==
The school's alumni include:

- Charlie Carroll, Lithographer, Etcher, Photographer.
- Bob Bolling, writer and illustrator for Archie Comics. Well-known for his work on Little Archie.
- Al Capp, cartoonist, comic-book artist, he only attended briefly.
- Amy Dacyczyn, writer and illustrator for The Tightwad Gazette
- Anne Carleton, painter
- Ernie Coombs, CBC's Mr Dressup
- Bill Everett, comic-book artist, creator of the Sub-Mariner
- Vernon Grant, comic-book writer-artist, The Love Rangers
- Robert Douglas Hunter, American painter and faculty member at Vesper George
- Henry E McDaniel, watercolor artist
- Paul McCobb, furniture designer
- Robert McCloskey, children's book author and illustrator, Make Way for Ducklings
- Whit Vye, art director at AEP for My Weekly Reader
- Francis Sumner Merritt, painter, printmaker.
- Jan Miner, actress, "Madge" in Palmolive TV commercials
- John Nesta, New England painter
- Sergio Roffo, New England painter.
- Gale Fulton Ross, American visual artist
- John Terelak, Impressionist painter
- Sam Petrucci, Radio operator, Illustrator, Designer, Painter
