= Nancy Schön =

American sculptor

- Born: Nancy Quint; September 24, 1928 (age 98); Boston, Massachusetts
- Education: Boston University, School of the Museum of Fine Arts at Tufts University
- Known for: Outdoor Sculptures
- Notable work: Make Way for Ducklings
- Spouse: Donald Alan Schön (1930-1997)
- Children: 4
- Website: www.schon.com

Nancy Schön (born 1928) is an American sculptor whose work is displayed internationally in museums, libraries, universities, private collections, and public outdoor spaces. She is best known for her work titled Make Way for Ducklings, installed in 1987 in the Boston Public Garden.

The sculpture is an homage to the journey of a family of ducks traveling through Boston immortalized in Robert McCloskey's 1941 children's classic Make Way for Ducklings. The sculpture, created by Schön with permission from McCloskey, is featured on the Boston Women's Heritage Trail.

In the late 1980s, then-First Lady Barbara Bush invited Russia's First Lady Raisa Gorbachev to meet in Boston. The two visited Schön's duckling sculpture while meeting with a group of children in the Boston area. Schön was later informed that Ms. Gorbachev admired the sculpture. An intricate process began involving the U.S. Government, the Russian Government, Schön, and numerous other individuals to have the sculpture duplicated and delivered to Russia.

The work is presently displayed in at Novodevichy Convent. A plaque on the sculpture, written in both Russian and English, states the sculpture was given "in love and friendship to the children of the Soviet Union on behalf of the children of the United States." At the installation, the first democratically elected mayor of Moscow, Gavriil Popov, was in attendance. He commented that "life in Moscow would improve with time and that, eventually, the ducklings would have lives as good as they had in Boston."

Schön received her associate degree from Boston University in 1948. In 1952, she received a Bachelor of Arts degree from Boston University and a degree in sculpture (with honors) from the School of the Museum of Fine Arts at Tufts. In 2008, she received an Honorary Doctor of Law from Mount Ida College.

Schön's sculptures are made of bronze because of its permanence and warm colors. Her work has evolved through her life experiences and often reflects the stage of her life at the time the sculptures were created. Initially, her sculptures involved the interplay of mother and children, as Schön was raising four children.

As her children became adults, Schön began creating sculptures of adult interactions and relationships, with one theme being the metaphor of climbing. She has said "how we interpret and go through our lives is evident in climbing, which often implies struggle and effort. We do not climb in a straight line but reach plateaus, rest, and then continue on. Our lives are sometimes joyous, sometimes sad, but always in motion, hopefully upward."

Some of Schön's sculptures depict animals. While Schön has always loved animals, it was a fortuitous event that led to the creation of some of her most recognized sculptures. Schön loved displaying her work in outdoor settings and viewing outdoor sculptures of other artists. However, she noticed that people, regardless of age, looked at outdoor sculptures in a static, non-interactive manner.

One day, however, she saw an outdoor sculpture of a child with a cat. People stopped to pet and hug the cat, seeming to overlook that the child was even part of the sculpture. It was at that moment that Schön saw the power animal sculptures had in creating a form of art whereby individuals do not just view the sculpture but engage with it, creating their own individual experience. Schön decided then that she wanted to create sculptures that people would interact, and preferably in a public place where it could be viewed for free.

Schön's duckling sculpture in Boston Public Gardens epitomizes the interaction people have with her outdoor sculptures. Every day, individuals (especially children but even adults) can be seen sitting on the ducks and taking photos. Throughout the year, individuals decorate the ducks to represent sports teams, holidays, special events, and social issues. They place t-shirts, sweaters, hats, scarves, caps, and other forms of expression.

Schön's works often exemplify her sense of justice, human rights, and social commentary. One of her more recent sculptures is a statement against the unjustness of the Russian war in Ukraine. The "sculpture shows an oversized military boot — its toe transformed into a bear face with fangs — about to descend on a tiny nightingale, the state bird of Ukraine. The bird stands atop a tear-shaped pool of rubble. Inside the boot is a hammer and sickle." As Schön explained to The Boston Globe, "As a child, she'd watched newsreels of Hitler's troops advancing into Czechoslovakia. 'And my child's eyes saw these boots,' she said. 'Marching boots. Only boots. Even at that age, I knew what it was about. And that image stayed with me." The moment she saw the first news about Russia invading Ukraine, she thought back to the boots of the Hitler troops.

Schön can appreciate political statements that others incorporate into her work. One such expression involved Schön's "Make Way for Ducklings" sculpture that presents Mrs. Mallard (a mother duck) walking with her eight ducklings following her. In 2019, Karyn Alzayer, a Boston University student, surrounded the ducklings with wire cages and put mylar blankets over them. Alzayer's goal was to symbolize the crisis at the United States' southern border. Alzayer separated the mother duck from the ducklings to symbolize how the United States government was separating children from their parents.

Even though Alzayer did not request Ms. Schön's permission to cage the ducklings, Ms. Schön "thought it was Brilliant! Brilliant! . . . I think it's one of the most compelling political statements that someone could possibly make. It turns out that the best thing of all about the use of the ducks in the book is the ducks were looking for a home, and these immigrant kids are looking for a home and put in cages with mylar blankets. I didn't object to it for one second because of the tragedy happening to these kids at the border."

In 1952, Schön married Donald Schön (1930–1997). Her series, The Reflective Giraffe, with a giraffe as the central icon, is a tribute to her husband, who was 6'4" tall. Schön has four children. Since 1966, she has lived in West Newton, Massachusetts.

== Prominent placement of Schön's sculptures ==
- 1987 Make Way for Ducklings, Boston Public Garden, Boston, MA
- 1991 Make Way for Ducklings, Novodevichy Park, Moscow, Russia
- 1991 Eeyore, Children's Patio, Newton Free Library, Newton, MA
- 1995 The Tortoise and The Hare, Copley Square, Boston, MA
- 1995 Raccoons and the Magic Horseshoes, Children's Bridge, Belle Meade, TN
- 1996 Empty Sled and Dog, Sarah Pryor Memorial, Hannah Williams Park Wayland, MA
- 2000 Dancing Girl, Edmond and Lily Safra Children's Hospital, Tel Aviv, Israel
- 2001 Winnie the Pooh and the Hunny Pot, Children's Patio, Newton Free Library, Newton, MA
- 2001 Scholarly, Whimsical, Gentle, Lucky, and Loving Dragon, Cambier Park, Naples, FL
- 2002 Lentil and his Dog, Lentil Park, Hamilton, Ohio
- 2002 Gateway to Independence, Carroll Center for the Blind, Newton, MA
- 2003 A Dragon for Dorchester, Nonquit Street Green, Dorchester, MA
- 2004 Nursing Sundial, Massachusetts General Hospital, Boston, MA
- 2008 Butterflies in the Francis Street Garden, Francis Street Garden, Boston, MA
- 2009 Tortoise and Hare, Crystal Bridges Museum of American Art, Bentonville, AR
- 2010 Sal's Bear, Children's Garden, Coastal Maine Botanical Gardens, Boothbay, ME
- 2012 Piglet, Children's Patio, Newton Free Library, Newton, MA
- 2014 Friendship, Children's Garden, Myriad Botanical Gardens, Oklahoma City, OK
- 2017 Butterfly. "Metamorphosis" exhibit at Regis College, Weston, MA
- 2019 Myrtle the Turtle, Myrtle Street Playground, Beacon Hill, MA
- 2021 Diversity - The Owl and the Pussy Cat, Nonquit Street Garden, Dorchester, MA
- 2021 Newton Bronze Flower, Newton Public Library, Newton, MA
- 2022 Caterpillar, Waban Commons, Newton, MA
- 2022 Charlie the Snail, Boston Children's Hospital, Boston, MA
- 2022 Millie the Ducky in a Puddle, Concord Library, Concord, MA
- 2023 "REACH" for Knowledge, Wellesley Free Library, Wellesley, MA
