= Robert McCloskey =

American writer and illustrator (1914–2003)

- Born: John Robert McCloskey; September 15, 1914; Hamilton, Ohio
- Died: June 30, 2003 (aged 88); Deer Isle, Maine, USA
- Education: Vesper George Art School
- Occupations: Writer, illustrator
- Spouse: Margaret Durand
- Children: Sarah, Jane
- Relatives: Ruth Sawyer (mother-in-law), Melba McCloskey (sister), Dorothy McCloskey (sister), Howard McCloskey (father), Mable McCloskey (mother)
- Writing career
- Period: 1940–1970
- Genre: Children's picture books
- Notable work: Make Way for Ducklings
- Notable awards: Caldecott Medal; 1942, 1957

John Robert McCloskey (September 15, 1914 – June 30, 2003) was an American writer and illustrator of children's books. He both wrote and illustrated eight picture books, and won two Caldecott Medals from the American Library Association for the year's best-illustrated picture book. Four of the eight books were set in Maine: Blueberries for Sal, One Morning in Maine, Time of Wonder, and Burt Dow, Deep-water Man (the last three of those four were all set on the coast). His best-known work is Make Way For Ducklings, set in Boston. In longer works, he both wrote and illustrated Homer Price, and he illustrated Keith Robertson's Henry Reed series. (Note: Henry Reed series. From 1958 to 1986, Keith Robertson wrote five books featuring the boy businessman Henry Reed. The Henry Reed books were reissued in 1989(?) paperback editions with ISBN 0-14-034144-7; ISBN 0-14-034145-5; ISBN 0-14-034146-3; ISBN 0-440-43570-6; ISBN 0-440-40104-6.)

== Biography ==
McCloskey was born in Hamilton, Ohio, on September 15, 1914, to Howard and Mabel McCloskey. He had two sisters, Melba and Dorothy. As a teen, McCloskey was a camper-turned-counselor at Camp Campbell Gard, where at age 16 he carved a totem pole which stood at the camp for over 50 years. His work on the totem pole is said to have led to his being chosen to create the bas relief and cast aluminum pieces decorating the Hamilton Municipal building in 1934, when he was 19.

He arrived in Boston in 1932 on a scholarship to study at Vesper George Art School. After Vesper George, he moved to New York City to study at the National Academy of Design.

In 1940, he married Peggy Durand, daughter of the children's writer Ruth Sawyer. They had two daughters, Sarah and Jane, and settled in New York State, spending summers on Scott Island, a small island just south of Stonington on Deer Isle in East Penobscot Bay. McCloskey's wife and elder daughter, Sarah, are the models for little Sal and her mother in Blueberries for Sal (1948), a picture book set on a "Blueberry Hill" in the vicinity. Three of his picture books are set on the coast and concern the sea.

Peggy died in 1991. Twelve years later, on June 30, 2003, McCloskey died in Deer Isle, Maine.

== Recognition ==
McCloskey won the 1942 Caldecott Medal for Make Way for Ducklings. The story, set in Boston, Massachusetts, features a mallard pair that nests on an island in the Charles River. After raising eight ducklings on the island, the mother leads them to the Public Garden downtown. A friendly policeman stops traffic to let them cross a busy street. The story soon became a Boston institution. Sculptor Nancy Schön created a bronze statue of Mrs. Mallard and the ducklings in 1987, installed along a walkway between the pond and the street. There thousands of children climb them every year and many more people photograph them; the park is also the annual site of a Make Way for Ducklings Mother's Day parade, featuring hundreds of children dressed in the costumes of their favorite characters. Since 2003 Make Way for Ducklings is the official children's book of Massachusetts.

McCloskey won a second Caldecott Medal in 1958 for Time of Wonder. Meanwhile, he had been a runner-up in 1949 for Blueberries for Sal, in 1953 for One Morning in Maine, and in 1954 for JourneyCake, Ho!, the latter written by his mother-in-law Sawyer. In a 1958 magazine article titled "Bob McCloskey, Inventor", another Medal winner Marc Simont observed that "[his] talent for devising mechanical contraptions is topped only by his ability to turn out books that carry off the Caldecott Medal."

The Homer Price stories (two books) were translated into Russian in the 1970s and became popular in the Soviet Union.

The U.S. Library of Congress named McCloskey a "Living Legend" in 2000.

== Films ==
One chapter from Homer Price was adapted as a short film, The Doughnuts (1963). The same chapter was adapted for an ABC Weekend Special called "Homer and the Wacky Doughnut Machine" (1977). Another chapter, "The Case of the Cosmic Comic", was also adapted as a short film.

In 1964, film producer Morton Schindel and Weston Woods Studios made Robert McCloskey, an 18-minute documentary that is sometimes screened in art schools. It shows McCloskey sitting in the Boston Public Garden, intercut with pages from his sketchbook drawings for Make Way for Ducklings, while the illustrator recounts experiences that influenced his work and discusses the relationship between craftsmanship and inspiration.

== Public art ==
- Totem Pole (summer 1931), now housed in the Hamilton, Ohio Municipal Building museum — McCloskey carved the totem pole while a counselor at Camp Campbell Gard where it stood for over 50 years
- Sculpture (completed 1935), Hamilton, Ohio Municipal Building — McCloskey created models in bas relief.
- Murals (1939), including six formerly housed in the Sloan Building (E52) on the MIT campus — McCloskey assisted Francis Scott Bradford depicting Beacon Hill socialites in large murals commissioned by the Lever Brothers of Cambridge, Massachusetts

== Derivative art ==
In Boston Public Garden, a sculpture of a family of nine ducks, by the sculptor Nancy Schön, installed in 1987, commemorates McCloskey's Make Way for Ducklings. A version was installed in Moscow in 1991. In Hamilton, Ohio, McCloskey's hometown, another sculpture by Schön, installed in 2002, depicts a boy and dog from McCloskey's first book, Lentil, published in 1940. McCloskey named the boy Lentil, but in a competition among schoolchildren the dog was given the name Harmony. In Boothbay Harbor, Maine, in the Coastal Maine Botanical Gardens, another sculpture by Schön, dedicated in 2010 and known as Sal's Bear, depicts a baby bear and a nearby spilled pail of blueberries, based on the drawings in McCloskey's Blueberries for Sal.

== Books ==
=== As author and illustrator ===
- Lentil (1940)
- Make Way for Ducklings (1941), Caldecott Medal winner
- Homer Price (1943)
- Blueberries for Sal (1948), a Caldecott Honor Award
- Centerburg Tales: More Adventures of Homer Price (1951); also issued as More Homer Price
- One Morning in Maine (1952), a Caldecott Honor Award
- Time of Wonder (1957), Caldecott Medal winner
- Burt Dow, Deep-water Man (1963)

=== As illustrator only ===
- Yankee Doodle's Cousins (1941) written by Anne Malcolmson
- Tree Toad: Adventures of the Kid Brother (1942) by Bob Davis, illus. McCloskey and Charles Dana Gibson
- Young America's English Book One (1942) by Helen Fern Daringer
- The Man Who Lost His Head (1942) by Claire Huchet Bishop; paperback reissue (1970) ISBN 0-440-84348-0
- Trigger John's Son (1949) by Tom Robinson
- Journey Cake, Ho (1953) by Ruth Sawyer, a Caldecott Honor Book
- Junket: The Dog Who Liked Everything "Just So" (1955) by Anne H. White
- Henry Reed, Inc. (1958), by Keith Robertson
- Henry Reed's Journey (1963), by Robertson
- Henry Reed's Babysitting Service (1966), by Robertson
- Henry Reed's Big Show (1970), by Robertson
