= Francis Sumner Merritt =

American fine artist

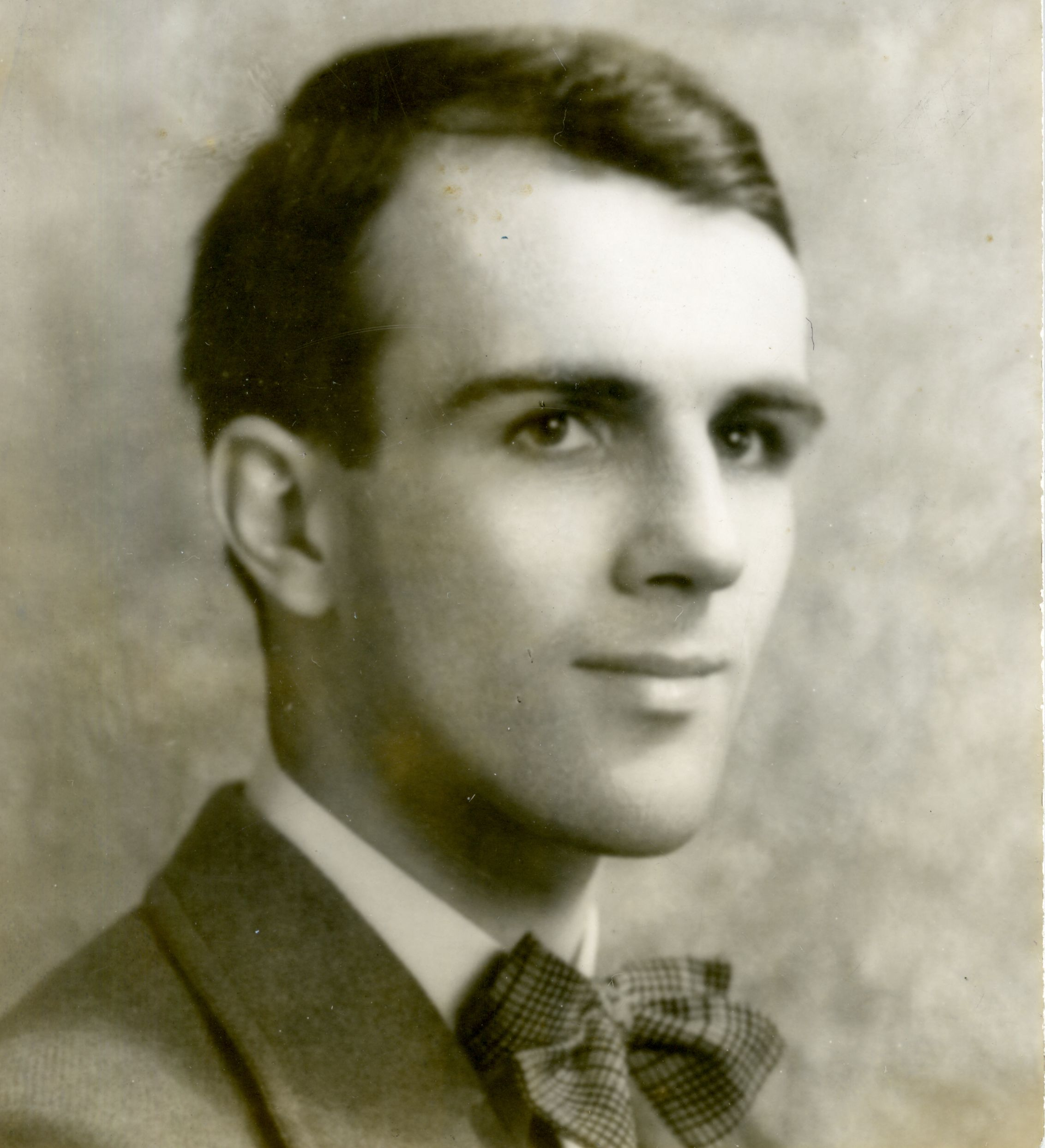
- Francis Merritt (1937) at the Abbot Academy
- Born: April 8, 1913; Danvers, Massachusetts, U.S.
- Died: December 27, 2000 (aged 87); Belfast, Maine, U.S.
- Other names: Francis Merritt, Fran Merritt
- Education: Vesper George School of Art, San Diego Academy of Fine Arts, Massachusetts School of Art, Yale University
- Occupation(s): Painter, teacher, arts administrator
- Known for: Fine art

Francis "Fran" Sumner Merritt (1913–2000) was an American painter, teacher, and arts administrator. He was a co-founder and first director of Haystack Mountain School of Crafts.

== Biography ==
Francis Sumner Merritt was born on April 8, 1913, in Danvers, Massachusetts. He studied at the Vesper George School of Art, the San Diego Academy of Fine Arts, the Massachusetts School of Art, and at Yale University.

Merritt taught at Abbot Academy, Cranbrook Academy of Art, and the Flint Institute of Arts (from 1947 to 1951). In 1950, the Haystack Mountain School of Crafts was founded in Liberty, Maine, and Merritt served as the school's first director. His wife Priscilla worked on the arts administration for the school. For many years they lived at Centennial House, just outside the town of Deer Isle, Maine.

Merritt died on December 27, 2000, in Belfast, Maine. His work is included in the museum collections at the National Gallery of Art, and the Hudson Museum.
