= John Terelak =

American Impressionist artist (born 1942)

John Charles Terelak
- Born: 1942 (age 83–84) (United States) Boston, Massachusetts
- Education: Vesper George School of Fine Art
- Known for: Landscapes, New England
- Movement: Post-Impressionism

John Charles Terelak (born 1942) is an American Impressionist artist known for painting scenes of New England.

== Personal life ==
John Terelak was born in 1942 in Boston, Massachusetts, and entered the Vesper George School of Art in 1960, becoming an instructor there after graduating. In 1975 he founded the Gloucester Academy of Fine Art. He was a president of the New England Watercolor Society.

== Collections ==
His paintings are included in collections including: the Andrew Mellon Foundation, Sheraton Corporation, Winthrop Financial Corporation, Prudential Insurance Company, Bank of Boston, Shawmut Bank, State Street Bank, Boston, and the Sterling-Regal Publishing Company.

His works have been included in exhibitions at The National Academy of Design, The Museum of Fine Arts, Boston, The Springfield Museum, and The Butler Museum, among others.
