= Make Way for Ducklings =

1941 children's book by Robert McCloskey

- Front cover illustration with the Caldecott Medallion
- Author: Robert McCloskey
- Illustrator: Robert McCloskey
- Cover artist: Robert McCloskey
- Genre: Children's literature
- Published: 1941
- Publisher: The Viking Press
- Publication place: United States
- ISBN: 9780670451494
- OCLC: 192241

Make Way for Ducklings is an American children's picture book written and illustrated by Robert McCloskey. First published in 1941 by the Viking Press, the book centers on a pair of mallards who raise their brood of ducklings on an island in the lagoon in the Boston Public Garden. It won the 1942 Caldecott Medal for McCloskey's illustrations, executed in charcoal then lithographed on zinc plates. As of 2003, the book had sold over two million copies. The book's popularity led to the construction of a statue by Nancy Schön in the Public Garden of the mother duck and her eight ducklings, which is a popular destination for children and adults alike. In 1991, Barbara Bush gave a duplicate of this sculpture to Raisa Gorbacheva as part of the START Treaty, and the work is displayed in Moscow's Novodevichy Park.

The book is the official children's book of the Commonwealth of Massachusetts. Praise for the book is still high over 80 years since its first publication, mainly for the enhancing illustrations and effective pacing. The book is popular worldwide.

== Background ==
Make Way for Ducklings, published in 1941, was McCloskey's second book and was the winner of the Caldecott Medal in 1942. In his acceptance speech, McCloskey explained his motivation for the story. While attending the Vesper George Art School between 1932 and 1936, he spent time in the Public Garden feeding the ducks. Following May Massee's suggestion that he pursue additional art training, he studied for two years at the National Academy of Design. When he returned to Boston to paint a mural he left with a rough draft for Make Way for Ducklings. To study ducks for the illustrations he visited the American Museum of Natural History in New York, conferred with an ornithologist and brought home six ducklings.

== Plot ==
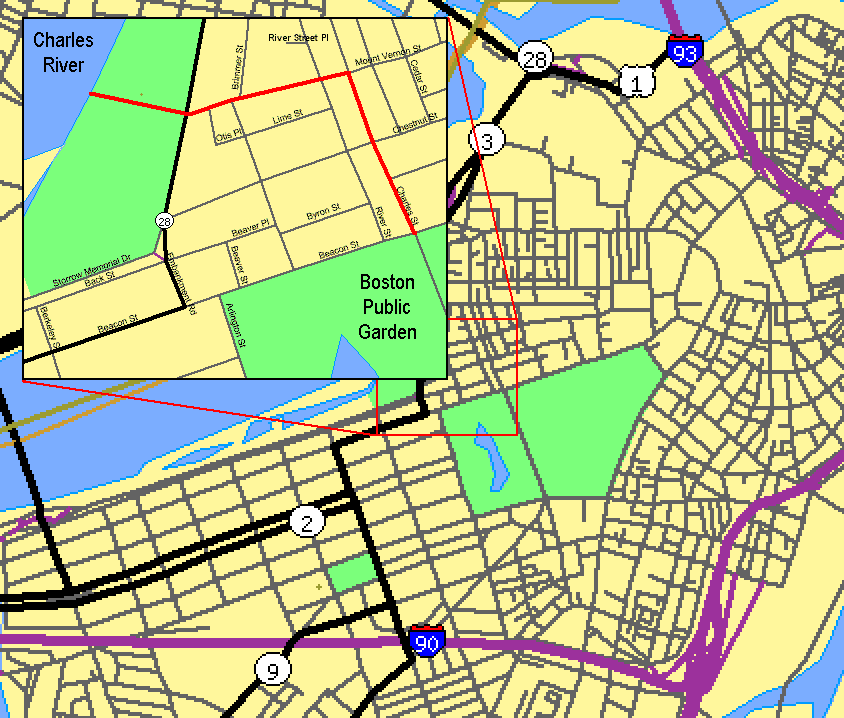
The route Mrs. Mallard takes from the Charles River to the Public Garden. Click on image for detail.

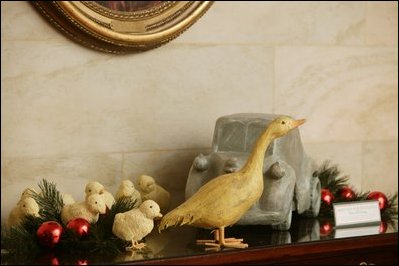
The White House 2003 Christmas decoration using Make Way for Ducklings as the theme

The story begins as two ducks (Mr. and Mrs. Mallard) fly over various potential locations in New England to start a family. Each time Mr. Mallard selects a location, Mrs. Mallard finds something wrong with it. Tired from their search, the mallards land at the Public Garden Lagoon to spend the night. In the morning, a swan boat passes by the mallards. The mallards mistake the swan boat for a real bird and enjoy peanuts thrown by the people on the boat. Mrs. Mallard suggests that they build their nest in the Public Garden. However, just as she says this, her husband is nearly run down by a passing bicyclist. The mallards continue their search, flying over Boston landmarks such as Beacon Hill, the Massachusetts State House, and Louisburg Square. The Mallards finally decide on an island in the Charles River. From this island, the Mallards visit a policeman named Michael on the shore, who feeds them peanuts every day.

Shortly thereafter, the Mallards molt, and will not be able to fly until their new feathers grow again, and Mrs. Mallard hatches eight ducklings named Jack, Kack, Lack, Mack, Nack, Ouack, Pack, and Quack. After the ducklings are born, Mr. Mallard decides to take a trip up the river to see what the rest of it is like. Mr. and Mrs. Mallard agree to meet at the Public Garden in one week. In the meantime, Mrs. Mallard teaches the eight ducklings all they need to know about being ducks, such as swimming, diving, marching along, and to avoid dangers such as bicycles and other wheeled objects.

One week later, Mrs. Mallard leads the ducklings ashore and straight to the highway in hopes of crossing to reach the Garden, but she has trouble crossing as the cars will not yield to her. Michael, the policeman whom the Mallards visited, stops traffic for the family to cross. Michael calls police headquarters and instructs them to send a police car to stop traffic along the route for the ducks. The ducks cross the highway, Embankment Road (Storrow Drive had yet to be constructed when the book was written), then proceed down Mount Vernon Street to Charles Street where they head south to the Garden. The people on the streets admire the family of ducks. When the family must cross Beacon Street to enter the Garden, there are four policemen standing in the intersection stopping traffic to make way for the ducklings. Mr. Mallard is waiting in the Public Garden for the rest of the family. Finally, the family decides to stay in the Garden and lives happily ever after. They end each day searching for peanuts and food, and when night falls, they swim to their little island and go to sleep.

== Illustrations ==
The lithographed illustrations, which are based on charcoal drawings, rendered in sepia, rather than the traditional black-and-white pictures found in most children's books of the day, received the 1942 Caldecott Medal, and has continued to garner praise years after its first publishing. The illustrations accurately depict the ducks and the city and emphasizes the point-of-view of the ducklings. Each of the eight ducklings shows individual characteristics, similar to children walking in a line. They are either "bored, inquisitive, sleepy, or they are scratching, talking over their backs one to another, running to catch up with the line". The book's message is comforting to children because it shows parents as caretakers, protectors, and teachers, and the ducklings who behave as ducks eventually find safety. According to fellow Caldecott winner Paul O. Zelinsky, "I realized that if the action in the drawings were to move from left to right, the ducks could not have been shown passing the Corner Book Shop, which is a wonderful detail in the story ... He clearly knew these streets very well."

== Reaction ==
=== Sales and republication ===
Make Way for Ducklings received the 1942 Caldecott Medal for its illustrations.

Make Way for Ducklings has been continuously in print since it was first published. As of 2003, the book had sold over two million copies. The story has also been published in paperback and audiobook. Viking Publishing planned to release a 75th-anniversary edition of the classic in March 2016.

=== Critical commentary ===
When it was first released in 1941, Ellen Buell of The New York Times called the book "one of the merriest we have had in a long time", praising the understated comedic aspect of the procession down Beacon Street, as well as McCloskey's "fine large pictures" which simultaneously demonstrate "economy of line" and "wealth of detail".

Alice Fannin says the "loosely plotted" story gives no true explanation for why Mr. Mallard leaves the island in the Charles River or why the Mallards did not simply stay on the lagoon island in the first place and avoid the bicyclists on the shore. However, McCloskey has stated himself that he thinks of himself as an artist who writes children's books and not vice versa. Fannin also finds the characterization lacking, that is, the Mallards represent "rather stereotypically concerned parents", often showing the same facial expressions and rarely showing expressiveness.

Another comment concerns on McCloskey's use of page breaks as a pacing technique. McCloskey's use of one-sentence pages forces the reader to quickly turn the page, enhancing the sense of motion, especially during the home search and when Mrs. Mallard teaches the ducklings their basic skills. McCloskey also employs this page break method to heighten surprise. When searching for a home, Mr. and Mrs. Mallard seem to have found a home on page eleven.

'Good,' said Mr. Mallard, delighted that at last Mrs. Mallard had found a place that suited her. But — (p. 11)

Then, they encounter a sudden problem with the chosen location when Mrs. Mallard is nearly run over by a bicyclist on page thirteen.

=== Gender roles ===
Make Way for Ducklings was published in the 1940s. Many books of the time portray a male-dominated society, a trend which Make Way for Ducklings does not follow. In context, the story takes place during wartime as fathers were being drafted and sent to Europe, requiring more social support for single-parent families. McCloskey presented Mrs. Mallard as an "independent and nonsubmissive female character". This strong portrayal has led one reviewer to label the book as "pre-feminist".

=== Surveys ===
Based on a 2007 online poll, the National Education Association listed Make Way for Ducklings as one of its "Teachers' Top 100 Books for Children". In 2012, it was ranked number six among the "Top 100 Picture Books" in a survey published by School Library Journal.

== Cultural effects ==
A bronze statue of the ducklings by Nancy Schön is a popular attraction in Boston Public Garden. A replica installed in Moscow was a gift from United States First Lady Barbara Bush to Soviet First Lady Raisa Gorbachev.

In the Boston Public Garden, where the Mallards eventually settled, a bronze statue by artist Nancy Schön has been erected of Mrs. Mallard and her eight ducklings. A statue similar to the one in the Boston Public Garden was erected in Novodevichy Park in Moscow as part of the START Treaty. The individual statues were presented by United States First Lady Barbara Bush to Russian First Lady Raisa Gorbachev as a gift to the children of the Soviet Union. Since 1978, Boston has hosted an annual Duckling Day parade each spring, with children and their parents dressed as ducklings. Part of the parade route retraces the path taken by Mrs. Mallard and her ducklings to get to the Public Garden. Readings of the book are also performed during the annual Return of the Swans celebration when Romeo and Juliet are reintroduced to the pond for the summer months.

In 2000, schoolchildren from Canton, Massachusetts, approached their state legislature to get a bill passed declaring Make Way for Ducklings the official children's book of the Commonwealth of Massachusetts. Legislators from Springfield, Massachusetts, blocked the bill on the grounds the official book should be by Springfield native Dr. Seuss. Legislators reached a compromise agreement to make Dr. Seuss the official children's author and Make Way for Ducklings the official children's book.

Awards
| Preceded by They Were Strong and Good | Caldecott Medal recipient 1942 | Succeeded by The Little House |
