= Colcord =

Colcord may refer to:

== People with the surname ==
- Anna L. Colcord (1864–1950), American writer and editor
- Charles Francis Colcord (1859–1934), American businessman and pioneer of the Old West
- Gerard Colcord (1900–1984), American architect
- Harry Colcord (1833–1906), American stuntman manager and artist
- Joanna Carver Colcord (1882–1960), American seafarer, social worker and writer
- Lincoln Colcord (1883–1947), American journalist and author
- Mabel Colcord (1873–1952), American actress
- Ray Colcord (1949–2016), American film and television composer
- Roswell K. Colcord (1839–1939), Governor of Nevada
- Shirlene Colcord (1965–2019), New Zealand quintuplet

== Places ==
- Colcord, Oklahoma
- Colcord, West Virginia

== Other uses ==
- Colcord Hotel, a historic boutique hotel in Oklahoma City, Oklahoma
- Colcord Farmstead, historic farm in Benton, Maine
