= East Main Street Historic District (Searsport, Maine) =

Historic district in Maine, United States

- U.S. National Register of Historic Places
- U.S. Historic district
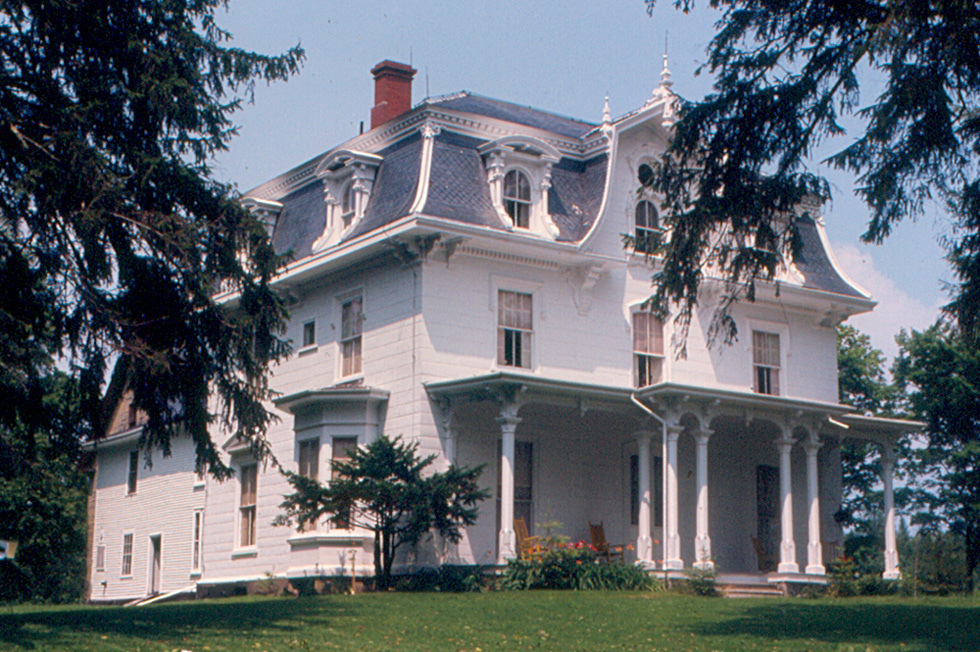
- The Capt. William McGilvery House

- Location within Maine Location within the United States
- Location: US 1 between Black Rd. and Navy St., Searsport, Maine
- Coordinates: 44°27′27″N 68°54′53″W
- Area: 20 acres (8.1 ha)
- Built: 1860
- Architectural style: Second Empire, Italianate
- NRHP reference No.: 91001815
- Added to NRHP: December 13, 1991

The East Main Street Historic District of Searsport, Maine encompasses an architecturally distinctive collection of five residential properties on United States Route 1 east of the town center. All five houses are at least somewhat Italianate in style, and were built by ship's captains between about 1860 and 1875. The district was listed on the National Register of Historic Places in 1991; three of the properties are also individually listed.

== Description and history ==
The East Main Street Historic District extends along United States Route 1, between Black Road to the west and Navy Street to the east. Three of the five houses are set on the north side of the road, while two are on its south side. One of the latter houses has land that extends all the way down to Penobscot Bay; all are set on generously proportioned lots, and form a grouping distinct from the housing on either side.

The Capt. John McGilvery House stands at the northeast corner of US 1 and Black Road, set back from the road. It is a three-story wood frame structure, with a mansard roof characteristic of the Second Empire style. The house and its associated carriage barn both have bracketed and denticulated cornices, and have roofs studded with pedimented dormers. McGilvery (1829-1904) was a hugely popular ship's captain who is reported to have never lost a vessel. To this house's right stands the Capt. Jonathan C. Nickels House, an Italianate 2-1/2 story house, to which later Stick style and Queen Anne decorations have been applied. Like the McGilvery House, it has paired brackets in the eaves, but Stick style ornamentation has been added to its gables, and its facade has been finished in part in bands of scalloped shingles. Nickels' family at one time owned the land on which all five houses were built. Flanking his house to the right is the Capt. William McGilvery House, one of central Maine's finest Second Empire mansions. William was one of John's four brothers, all of whom went to sea; in addition to his seafaring, William was a state legislator and a major shipbuilder and landowner on Penobscot Bay.

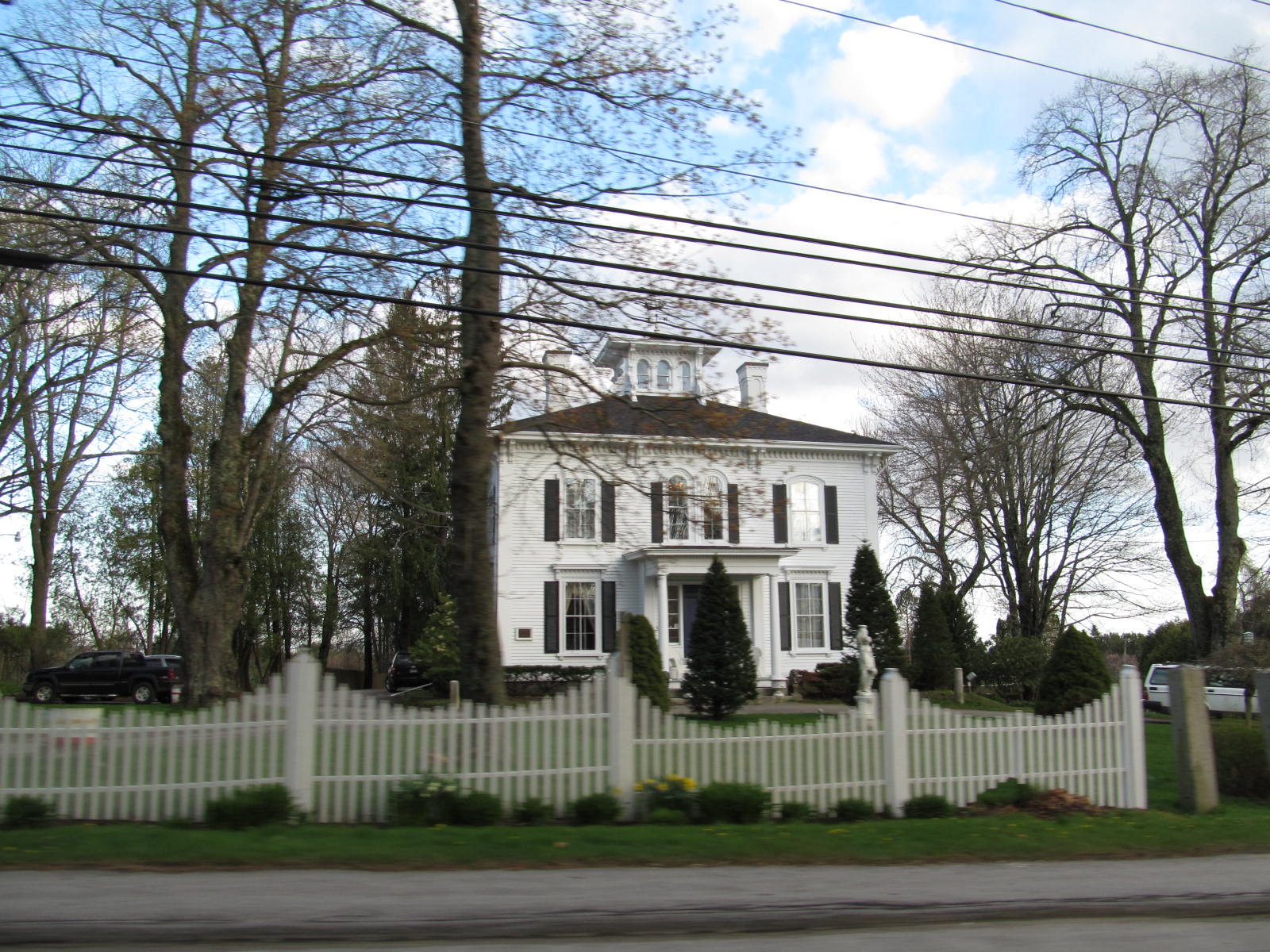
The Nichols House

At the southeast corner of US 1 and Summer Street stands the Capt. Albert V. Nickels House. Built about 1874-75, it is a rambling 2-1/2 story Italianate structure, with Carpenter Gothic bargeboard and other jigsawn decorative elements. Albert Nickels was a brother of Jonathan, and was married to William McGilvery's daughter Elizabeth. East of his house stands the Capt. John P. Nichols House, a cubical Italianate house with a cupola and a later Colonial Revival entry porch. John Nichols was a nephew of Albert Nickels. His house is also notable as the home of Carleton Bryant, a United States Navy admiral during World War II.

== See also ==
- National Register of Historic Places listings in Waldo County, Maine
