= Capt. John McGilvery House =

Historic house in Maine, United States

- U.S. National Register of Historic Places
- U.S. Historic district – Contributing property
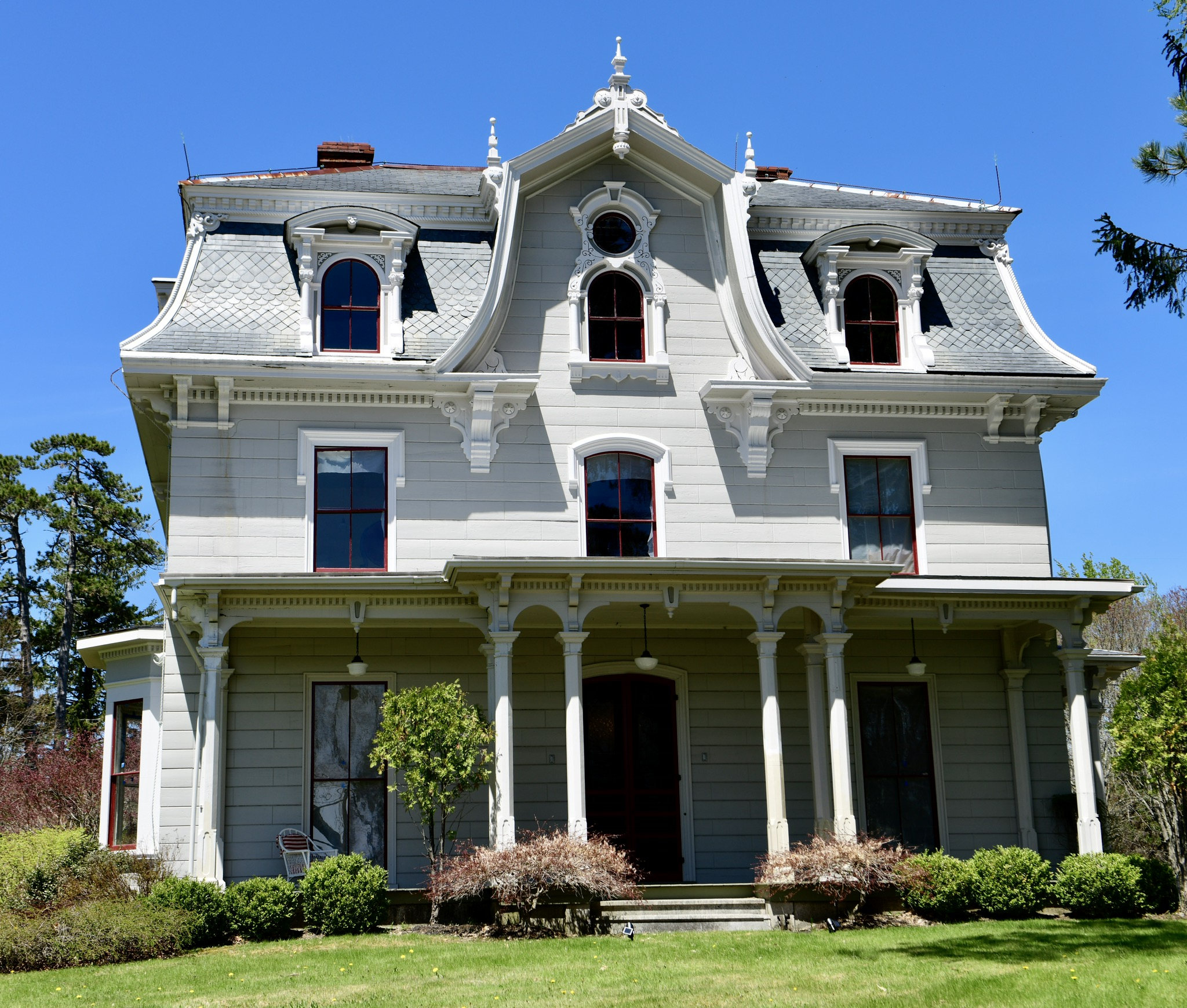

- Location within Maine Location within the United States
- Location: E. Main St., Searsport, Maine
- Coordinates: 44°27′31″N 68°55′0″W
- Area: 1 acre (0.40 ha)
- Built: 1874
- Architectural style: Second Empire
- Part of: East Main Street Historic District (ID91001815)
- NRHP reference No.: 83003685

Significant dates
- Added to NRHP: December 29, 1983
- Designated CP: December 13, 1991

The Capt. John McGilvery House is a historic house on East Main Street in Searsport, Maine. Built in 1874 for a popular local ship's captain, it is one of mid-coast Maine's finest examples of residential Second Empire architecture. The house was listed on the National Register of Historic Places, and is a contributing property to Searsport's East Main Street Historic District.

== Description and history ==
The John McGilvery House stands on the north side of East Main Street (United States Route 1), at its northeast corner with Black Road. It is set back from the road, and stands next to the house of his brother William, an even more elaborately decorated building. It is a three-story wood-frame structure, topped by a mansard roof and clad in wooden shingles. It has an L-shaped plan, with a single-story porch at the crook of the L, which extends to the right to join with a period carriage barn. The mansard roofs of both the house and barn are studded with mini-gabled bracketed dormers, and the roof lines are studded with paired brackets. The main entrance is framed by pilasters topped by a corniced entablature, with a two-story projecting polygonal bay to its left.

The house was built in 1874 for John McGilvery, a ship's captain from a local family prominent in the shipping business, and is one of a cluster of high-quality houses built around that time by related captains on East Main Street. McGilvery was one of five brothers, all of whom became sea captains, and he conducted a highly successful career at sea, where he had a reputation for popularity and safety.

== See also ==
- National Register of Historic Places listings in Waldo County, Maine
