= Sam Houston (Maine soldier) =

Bodyguard to Gen. George Washington

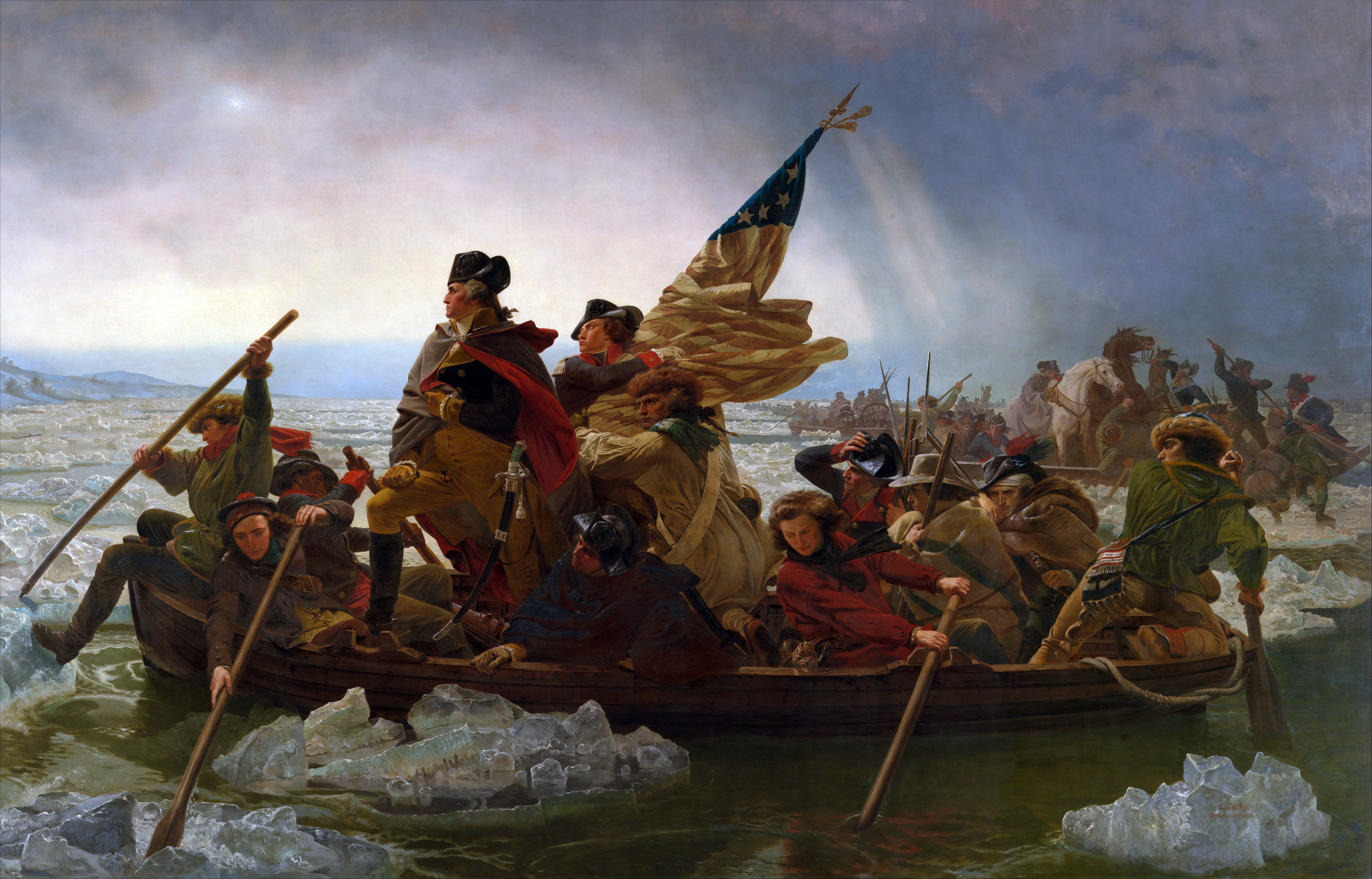
- Houston is depicted in the painting Washington Crossing the Delaware
- Occupations: Continental Army soldier, American Revolution
- Known for: bodyguard to Gen. George Washington

Sam Houston (fl. 1770s) was a bodyguard to Gen. George Washington and was one of the first residents of Searsport, Maine. He is depicted in the painting Washington Crossing the Delaware, and his cutlass and chest are on display at the Penobscot Marine Museum.
