= Marlboro Packard =

American shipbuilder

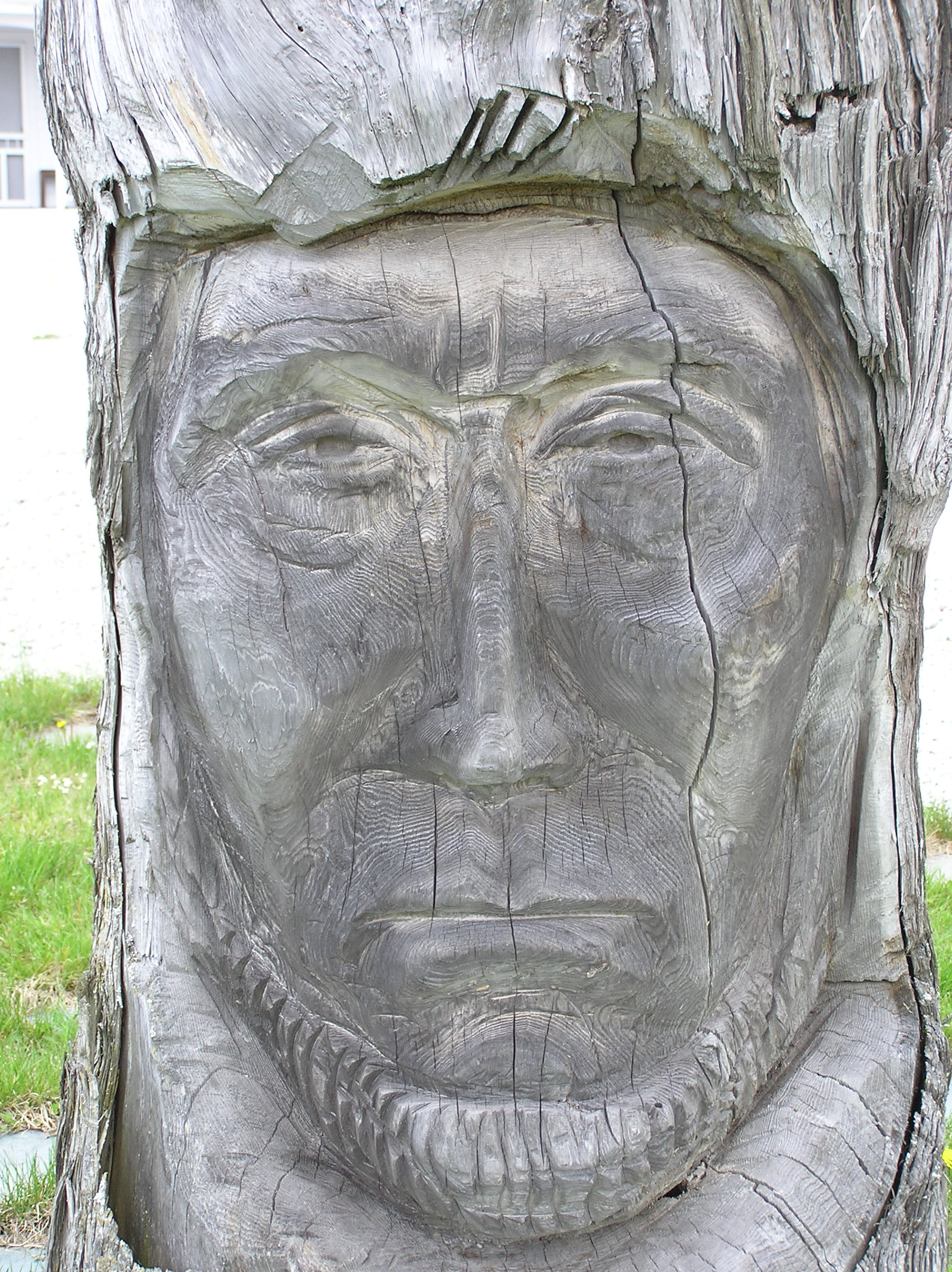
- A tree trunk carved in the likeness of Marlboro Packard. This tree is found on the grounds of his home in Searsport, Maine.
- Born: August 19, 1828; Searsmont, Maine
- Died: February 4, 1904 (aged 75); Searsport, Maine
- Occupation: Master Shipbuilder

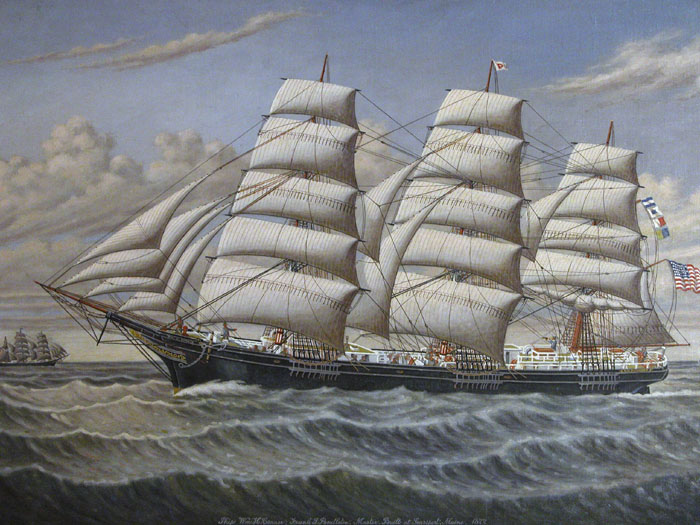
Marlboro Packard was the Master Shipbuilder in charge of constructing the ship William H. Conner which is featured in this painting by Percy A. Sanborn.

Marlboro Packard (August 19, 1828 – February 4, 1904) was a master shipbuilder who lived in Searsport, Maine. He managed several economically important shipyards in Searsport. He built several ships including the ship Oneida in 1877 at the McGilvery Yard. In 1877 he built the ship William H. Conner, which was the last and largest full-rigged ship built in Searsport. This ship's construction took place at the Carver Yard and cost over $100,000. The half-model of this ship is currently housed at the Penobscot Marine Museum.

His parents were Nathan Packard and Mary (Chase) Packard. He married Mary Maria Parke on April 3, 1859. His home, known as the Packard House, was built in 1851, and converted to a motel in 1948. It is currently the home of the Yardarm Motel.
