= Bangalore (1886 ship) =

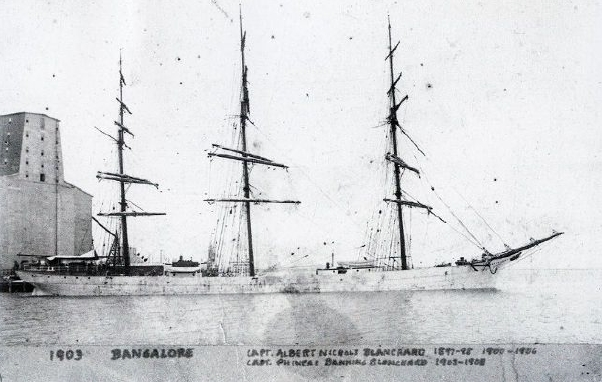
- Ship Bangalore in 1903

History

United Kingdom
- Name: Bangalore
- Owner: G. Crenshaw and Company, London
- Builder: Richardson, Duck & Company, Stockton-on-Tees, England
- Launched: August 1886

United States
- Name: Bangalore
- Acquired: Maine Navigation Company of New York, 1901
- Fate: Disappeared, 1908

General characteristics
- Type: Three-masted, square-rigged ship
- Tonnage: 1,743 gross tons
- Length: 260 feet (79 m)
- Beam: 40 feet (12 m)
- Depth: 23 feet (7.0 m)
- Propulsion: Sail

== History ==
Built in Stockton-on-Tees, England in 1886 by Richardson, Duck & Company shipbuilders, the Bangalore was a three-masted square-rigged ship intended for the East Indian trade. She was 260 feet long, 40 feet beam, and 23 feet deep, measuring 1,743 gross register tons. Typical of other ships built by Richardson, Duck & Company at the time, the Bangalore had a steel hull, which was painted a lead color.

Employed by the Bangalore's original owners, G. Crenshaw and Company, her first commander was Captain Ray D. Congdon from Rhode Island. Under his command, she made several trips between England and America to points east, most notably Calcutta and Hong Kong. Congdon is reported to have helped design the Bangalore.

Due to illness in early 1896, Congdon was replaced by his first mate, who while returning to Boston, "went aground about one-half mile north of the Bell buoy, on the middle grounds, near Cape Charles, at 2:30 o'clock yesterday afternoon". Refloated by a pilot boat, the Bangalore again went aground "on the Horseshoe to the northward of the lighthouse". After being towed to Boston for repairs, the Bangalore changed to a United States registry in 1901, purchased by the Maine Navigation Company of New York.

Under American ownership, command of the ship changed to Captain Albert Nickels Blanchard of Searsport, Maine. Captain Blanchard both commanded and took one-fifth ownership of the ship until 1906, establishing a steady route between the eastern United States and the Hawaiian Islands. Cargo primarily consisted of coal en route to Hawaii and sugar to the eastern ports of Delaware Breakwater, Baltimore, and Philadelphia.

Albert Blanchard's younger brother Phineas Banning Blanchard took command of the Bangalore in 1906, continuing command of the route that took her around Cape Horn two more times. Banning Blanchard retained command of the Bangalore until October 1907, when command was succeeded briefly by a Captain Colley.

== Disappearance ==
On October 23, 1907, the Bangalore sailed with a crew of 21 men from Norfolk bound for Honolulu with 2,600 tons of coal consigned for the United States Navy. Captain Colley's wife and children were also on board.

On November 24, 1907, she was reported at 7°N 26°W. This was her last reported sighting.

By mid-July 1908, over 270 days out, she had still not officially been posted at Lloyd's of London as missing, although insurance adjustments indicated that inevitability. Out more than 9 months, on a voyage that normally took about 5 months, she would almost certainly have been out of provisions and forced to some port for food and water.

There are several theories about her disappearance. Two of them, suggested years afterward by former captains, are that the Bangalore collided with another vessel - for example, the Falkenbank which disappeared around the same time - or with an iceberg, which were a common hazard below the Roaring Forties. (On a voyage around Cape Horn in 1906, Captain Banning Blanchard reported seeing an iceberg estimated at 9 miles long and 800 feet high, about 200 miles southeast by south from Cape Horn.) This is the account in the vessel history, for a model of the Bangalore in the collection of the Mariners' Museum and Park of Newport News, Virginia. By April 21, 1908, five ships had made the same trip around Cape Horn arriving safely in Honolulu and reporting no sign of the Bangalore.

Another theory is that a storm drove her east, forcing her to sail around Cape of Good Hope instead. Contemporaneous reports speculate whether the Bangalore is the "large ship with her topgallantmasts gone, lying to the northeast of the reef" at Middleton reef, Australia.

At the time of her disappearance the Bangalore was "valued at about $75,000, of which less than two-thirds [was] insured".

== Notable Events ==
Although not built for speed, the Bangalore was fast, with a best day record of 351 nautical miles and "holding the record from the Cape of Good Hope to Anjer in twenty-two days".

On May 20, 1895, the Bangalore under the command of Captain Congdon was one of two ships - the other being Wandering Jew - to leave New York "in ballast" for Anjer to await further orders. It was reported that this was the "first time in the history of the merchant marine of a vessel leaving an American port for Anjer without cargo."

In 1906, on a voyage between Philadelphia and Honolulu, a coal fire took hold in the ship's hull. She managed to round Cape Horn, safely reaching port in Valpariso, Chile on January 8, 1907, in order to fully extinguish the fire by January 12, before continuing on to Honolulu.

Paul Eve Stevenson wrote A Deep-Water Voyage as an account of being a passenger aboard the Bangalore. In the novel, written in diary form between June 29 and November 8, 1897, on a voyage from New York and Calcutta, Stevenson tells of the daily experiences aboard the ship Mandalore (Bangalore) with a Captain Kingdon (Congdon).

The Bangalore was the subject of an exhibition in 1948 at The Mariners' Museum in Newport News, Virginia. She was also included in an exhibition from 2001 titled Women and the Sea, also at The Mariners' Museum. This exhibition included "an example of a sextant used by Georgia Maria Gilkey Blanchard of Searsport, Maine, who honeymooned [with her husband Captain Phineas Banning Blanchard] at sea aboard the Bangalore." The account of this honeymoon adventure is retold is several publications, including American Merchant Ships 1850-1900 and Hen Frigates: Wives of Merchant Captains Under Sail.
