= Phineas Banning Blanchard =

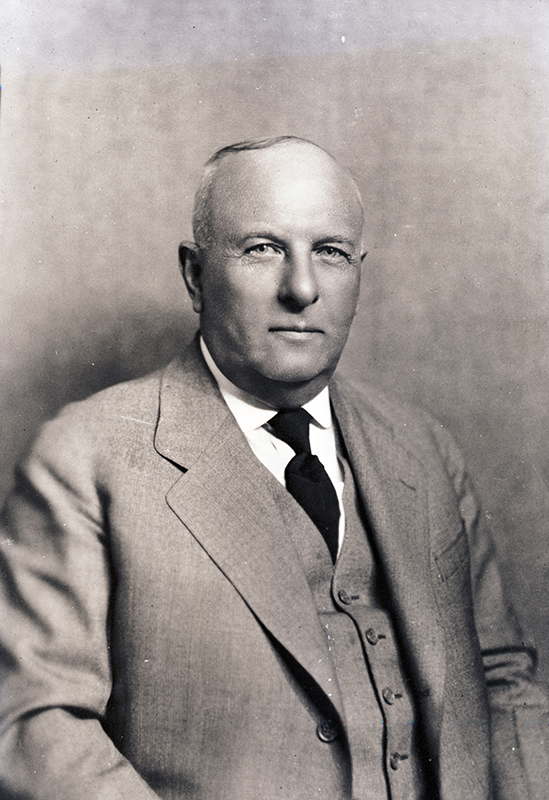
- Captain Phineas Banning Blanchard, courtesy Penobscot Marine Museum
- Born: February 20, 1879 at sea, aboard the bark Wealthy Pendleton
- Died: April 23, 1962; Brooklyn, New York, US
- Occupations: sea captain; president and chairman of Turner & Blanchard, Inc.
- Spouse: Georgia Maria Gilkey Blanchard
- Children: Georgia (1907), Clara (1912), Anne (1917)

Captain Phineas Banning Blanchard (1879–1962) was a tall ship sea captain, among the last of the American merchant trade in the Age of Sail.

As president and governor of several maritime associations in New York City, he was recognized for his contributions to the development of the maritime industry in the port of New York.

== Early years ==
Phineas Banning Blanchard was born at sea off the California coast in 1879 on board the bark Wealthy Pendleton to Clara E. Pendleton and William H. Blanchard, captain of Wealthy Pendleton from 1874 to 1883. At the time of his birth, the Wealthy Pendleton had been grounded on a mud flat near Santa Catalina Island.

His father chose the name Phineas Banning to honor his friend General Phineas Banning of Wilmington, California. As a young man, Captain Blanchard would return to San Pedro to work for the Wilmington Transportation Company, which his namesake, General Banning, founded in 1884.

The Blanchard family was among the oldest in Searsport, Maine; Captain Blanchard descended from several generations of sea captains. Phineas Banning Blanchard and his five siblings, including three brothers who were also sea captains, spent the majority of their childhood in Searsport.

== Military service ==
Captain Blanchard served eight months in the American Navy, during which he participated in the Spanish-American War as Boatswain's mate first class (BM1) on the auxiliary cruiser Prairie.

== Command History ==
Captain Blanchard's first command was the American bark Herbert Black in 1899 (through 1900), when he was only nineteen years old. His father, Captain William Houston Blanchard, was also captain of the bark from 1890 to 1891, in 1896, and 1900–1901.

Captain Blanchard's second command, which he held between 1902 and 1904, was the bark Willard Mudgett. Succeeding a Captain Colcord, Captain Blanchard assumed command of the bark when his father purchased it from C. S. Gillden of Boston. Tragically, the Willard Mudgett was lost at sea on September 14, 1904, having been caught in a terrible storm between Newport News, Virginia and Bangor, Maine. At the time of her disappearance, Captain Blanchard's older brother, Frederick, was in command and their father was a passenger (on the vessel he still owned).

His final command of a sailing vessel was the ship Bangalore, which he began in 1906. His first voyage on the Bangalore was from Philadelphia to San Francisco, which he made as a newlywed with his wife Georgia Maria Gilkey Blanchard. This trip is chronicled in several books and articles.

From 1907 through 1913, Captain Blanchard piloted steamships in the Pacific Coast service, commanding "every boat in the Wilmington Transportation Company's fleet of vessels". His last command was the passenger steamship Cabrillo, which made daily recreational excursions from San Pedro to Santa Catalina Island.

== Port of New York Leadership ==
In 1913, Captain Blanchard retired from the sea and moved back east, settling in New York City where he would live the rest of his life.

For over 40 years, he was instrumental in the development of maritime activities in the port of New York, specifically those related to freight handling.

In 1915, he began work at Turner & Blanchard, Inc., contracting stevedores, formed in 1911 by Salon E. Turner and his brothers Albert Nickels Blanchard and Scott Blanchard, with an initial capitalization of $1,000. He started work on the docks as a manual laborer. And by 1937, he had become president of the company, a position as chairman he held until his death in 1962. Turner & Blanchard continued operations in New York City until 1964.

Captain Blanchard was a trustee of Sailors' Snug Harbor, a home for retired merchant seamen. On November 2, 1934, he was appointed governor.

He was Chairman of the Association's Committee that compiled the Maritime Safety Code for Stevedoring and Freight Handling Operations. This operations manual for the safe handling of cargo to prevent personal injuries was distributed by the Department of Labor and used by the Armed Forces during World War II, with some 30,000 copies being distributed.

He served as 34th President of the Marine Society of the City of New York (1933-1934) and as president of the Maritime Association of the Port of New York (1939-1941).

On March 16, 1948, Captain Blanchard was recognized by the Maritime Association of the Port of New York on the 15th annual Port of New York Day for his "distinguished contribution to the development of maritime activities in the port of New York".

As president of Turner & Blanchard, Captain Blanchard testified in March 1949 before a United States Senate subcommittee of the Committee of Labor and Public Welfare in hearings pertaining to overtime compensation provisions of the Fair Labor Standards Act of 1938. His testimony expressed strong support for the International Longshoremen's Association while opposing a proposal for overtime pay adjustments.

== Jerry Anastasia Racketeering Trial ==
In December 1952, Captain Blanchard, then president of Turner & Blanchard, testified in a racketeering trial for Gerardo (Jerry) Anastasia, "one of the waterfront's most feared characters and a brother of Albert Anastasia, the one-time head of Murder, Inc."

Taking the stand, Captain Blanchard told how Anastasia and Frank Russo tried through extortion to be put on the payroll for $200 per week. Blanchard testified, "I was so enraged. I wanted to throw them out. I told Jerry Anastasia to go and see his brother and ask him how much chance he had of getting any money out of me".

Anastasia's sentencing was postponed for several years due to ill health. He was sentenced in January 1957 to one year and a day in federal prison for perjury.

== Ship Models ==
Captain Blanchard was a master woodworker, creating dozens of fine ship models. Some of his models are in museum collections, including in the Penobscot Marine Museum in Searsport, Maine and the Mariners' Museum in Newport News, Virginia.
