= Capt. John P. Nichols House =

Historic house in Maine, United States

- U.S. National Register of Historic Places
- U.S. Historic district – Contributing property
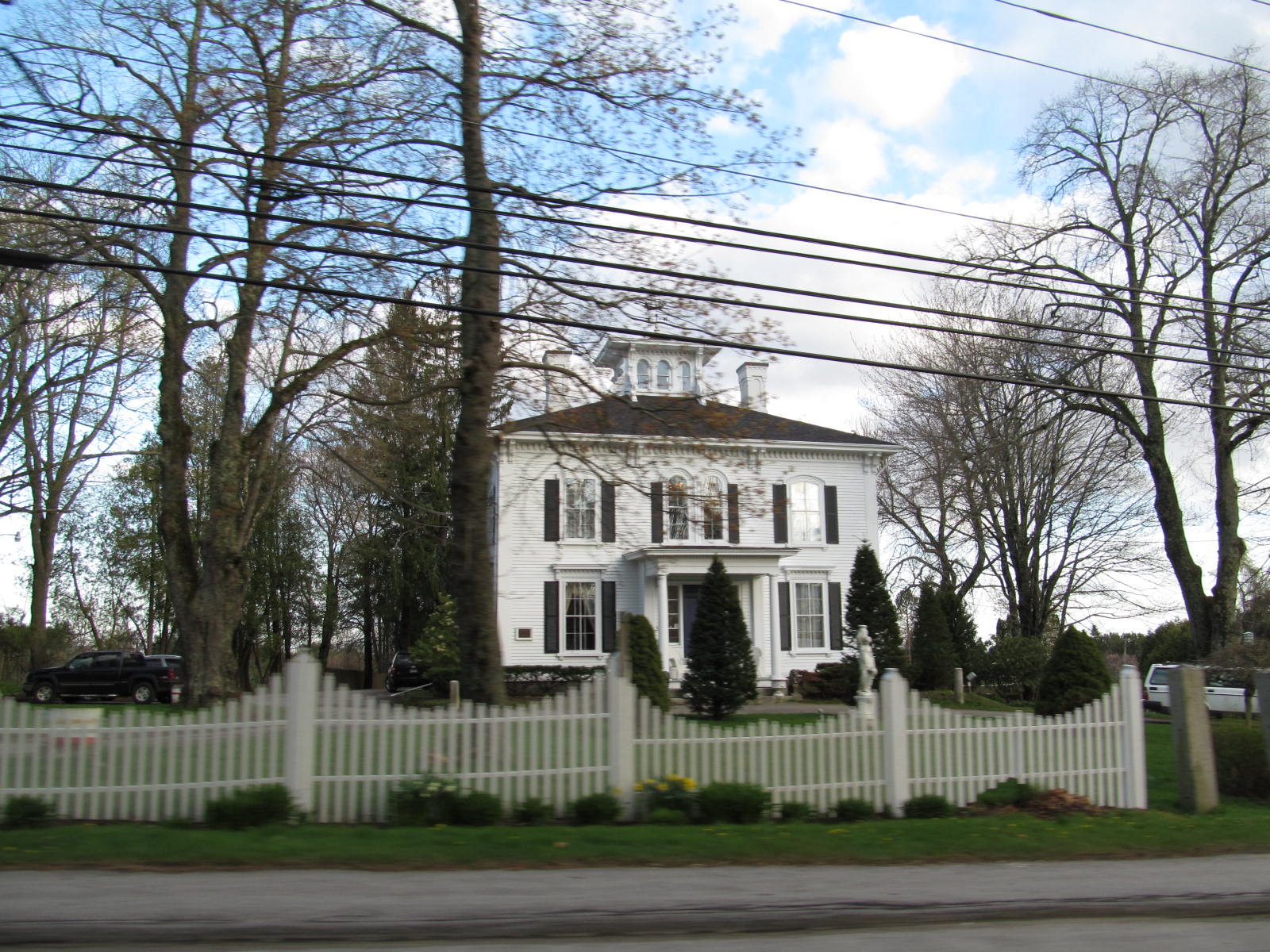

- Location within Maine Location within the United States
- Location: 121 E. Main St. (US 1), Searsport, Maine
- Coordinates: 44°27′28″N 68°54′56″W
- Area: 0.3 acres (0.12 ha)
- Built: 1865
- Architectural style: Colonial Revival, Italianate
- Part of: East Main Street Historic District (ID91001815)
- NRHP reference No.: 83000476

Significant dates
- Added to NRHP: January 4, 1983
- Designated CP: December 13, 1991

The Capt. John P. Nichols House is a historic house at 121 East Main Street (United States Route 1) in Searsport, Maine. Built in 1865 for a ship's captain from a prominent local family, it is one of Waldo County's finest examples of Italianate architecture, with a particularly elaborate cupola. The house was listed on the National Register of Historic Places in 1983. It is now the Homeport Inn.

== Description and history ==
The Nichols House stands east of the Searsport town center, at the southeast corner of East Main Street and Summer Street. It is one of a cluster of fine 19th-century houses that make up the East Main Street Historic District. It is a roughly cubic wood-frame structure, capped by a hip roof with deep eaves that are decorated with dentil moulding and paired brackets. The roof is topped by an elaborate square cupola, with corner pilasters, grouped round-arch windows on each side, and a bracketed and dentillated cornice similar to that of the main roof. The front facade is three bays wide, with an early 20th-century Colonial Revival portico sheltering its main entrance. First-floor windows are capped by bracketed and dentillated lintels. The central second-floor bay houses a pair of round-arch windows, while the flanking bays house segmented-arch sash windows.

The house was built in 1865 for John P. Nichols, one of Searsport's most successful ship captains of the period. The Searsport Nicholses were prominent in the shipping industry of Searsport, producing at least twenty-seven ship captains. Nichols was also related indirectly by marriage to the McGilverys, whose mansions stand across the street. A later resident of this house, Carleton Bryant, was an admiral of the United States Navy during World War II.

== See also ==
- National Register of Historic Places listings in Waldo County, Maine
