= Lincoln Colcord =

American journalist

Lincoln Ross Colcord
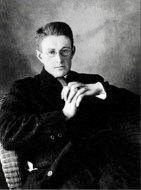
- Born: August 14, 1883; Off Cape Horn South Atlantic Ocean
- Died: November 16, 1947 (aged 64); Belfast, Maine
- Burial place: Elmwood Cemetery, Searsport, Maine
- Education: University of Maine
- Occupations: Author, journalist
- Spouses: Blanche Meade Morgan Colcord, Loomis Logan Colcord, Frances Brooks Colcord
- Parents: Captain Lincoln Alden Colcord (father); Jane French Sweetser Colcord (mother)

Lincoln Ross Colcord (August 14, 1883 – November 16, 1947) was an American journalist and author of short fiction. He wrote for a number of American newspapers and magazines beginning in 1908, and throughout the Woodrow Wilson presidency (1913–1921).

== Early life ==
Both of Colcord's parents, Jane French (Sweetser) and Captain Lincoln Alden Colcord, came from Maine families with generations-long traditions of life on and around the sea. Jane French delivered her son Lincoln aboard the commercial sailing ship, the Charlotte A. Littlefield, during a storm while navigating around Cape Horn. Aside from time spent on shore at Penobscot Bay or in Searsport, Maine, Lincoln and his older sister, Joanna Carver Colcord, spent most of their childhood at sea aboard the various sailing vessels captained by their father, visiting ports as far away as Hong Kong as part of the merchant trade.

== Education and writing career ==
Jane Colcord tutored her children at sea, and Lincoln's early high school education was by correspondence course. It was only after he entered the high school in his hometown of Searsport, Maine, that he became rooted more to the soil than the sea. Colcord attended the University of Maine, where he is best known for writing the lyrics to the "Maine Stein Song," later recorded by his friend Rudy Vallee. The song was also published as sheet music during the 1930s, leading to a brief battle over copyright. Immediately after college, he was briefly employed as a civil engineer with the Bangor and Aroostook Railroad in Maine.

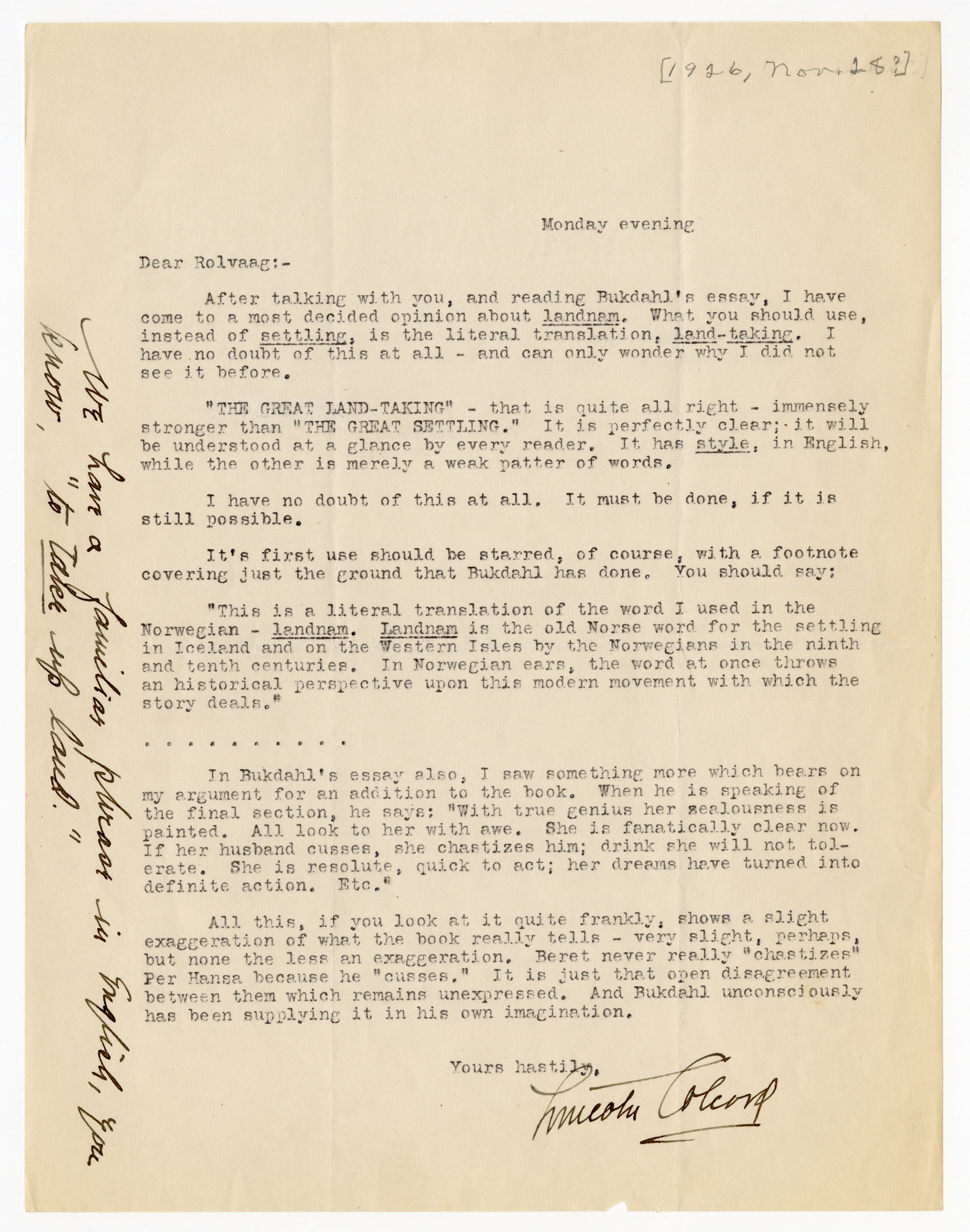
Letter from Lincoln Colcord to O.E. Rølvaag discussing translation of Giants in the Earth.

He was considered by many to be one of the best and most authentic American authors of sea stories in his time and beyond. His first published story appeared in 1908. His short fiction was serialized in various magazines such as The American, McClure's, The Bookman, and Burr McIntosh Monthly, among others. His books include The Drifting Diamond, An Instrument of the Gods, Under Sail, The Game of Life and Death, as well as his epic poem, Vision of War. His works often featured themes relating to Asian culture and the far east, regions and people who had a large influence on him as a boy during his voyages. He is also noted for bringing to print the English translation of Ole Rølvaag's book Giants in the Earth, and as a contributor to various other works, including the nautical history, Sailing Days on the Penobscot by George S. Wasson.

As a journalist, he wrote political commentary for various American newspapers and magazines including the International News Service, The New York Post, Hampton's Magazine, The Nation, The Washington Post, The Freeman, The American Mercury, The Dial, The New York Call, and the Philadelphia Public Ledger, where he was staff correspondent beginning in 1917. His journalism often caused controversy. In the investigative case files of the Bureau of Investigation, he was branded as a "strong advocate of the Lenin-Trotsky regime." He was Secretary of the League of Free Nations Association.

As a political journalist, he is also listed as a director of New English Monthly Magazine The Searchlight, a publication listed under the heading of "Foreign Radical Publications" by the Office of Radical Publications. Here, Colcord is also branded as a "propagandist." He was profiled in the 1954 The New Radicalism in America, 1889–1963 by Christopher Lasch. The book highlights his close association with an adviser of US President Woodrow Wilson, Edward M. House.

== Late life ==
Following his career in journalism, Colcord focused his life on maritime history as a founder of the Penobscot Marine Museum in Searsport, Maine, and the journal, The American Neptune. He was elected in 1936 as Clerk of the Corporation and Secretary to the Board of the museum.
