= Capt. William McGilvery House =

Historic house in Maine, United States

- U.S. National Register of Historic Places
- U.S. Historic district – Contributing property
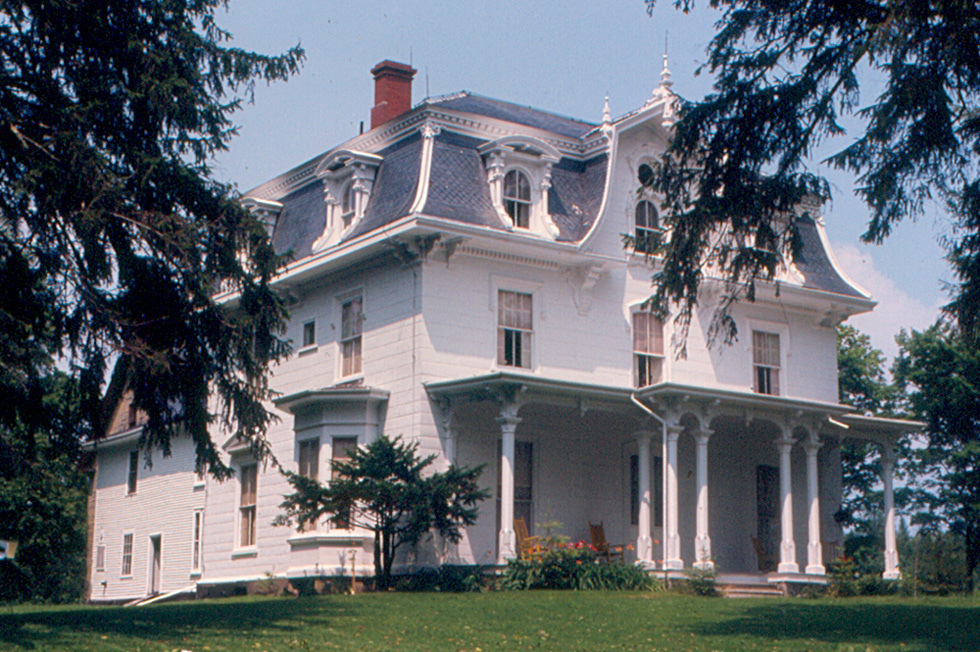

- Location within Maine Location within the United States
- Location: E. Main St., Searsport, Maine
- Coordinates: 44°27′33″N 68°54′52″W
- Area: 0.5 acres (0.20 ha)
- Built: 1873
- Architectural style: Second Empire
- Part of: East Main Street Historic District (ID91001815)
- NRHP reference No.: 83003686

Significant dates
- Added to NRHP: December 29, 1983
- Designated CP: December 13, 1991

The Capt. William McGilvery House is a historic house on East Main Street in Searsport, Maine. Built in 1873 for a prominent local ship's captain, businessman and politician, it is one of mid-coast Maine's finest examples of residential Second Empire architecture. The house was listed on the National Register of Historic Places in 1983, and is a contributing property to Searsport's East Main Street Historic District.

== Description and history ==
The William McGilvery House stands on the north side of East Main Street (United States Route 1), just north of the house of his brother John. It is a roughly cubic 2 1/2-story wood-frame structure, topped by a mansard roof and clad in flushboarding treated to resemble ashlar stone. The roof has elaborately decorated dormers projecting from the steep roof section, which is flared at the eave, and has a dentillated cornice line at the break between the roof sections. The main eave is also dentillated, with paired brackets at intervals. A large wall dormer with a gambrel gable rises at the center of the front facade, with wooden finials at the roof corners. A porch extends across the front, supported by groups of square posts and pilasters.

The house was built in 1873 for William McGilvery, a ship's captain from a local family prominent in the shipping business, and is one of a cluster of high-quality houses built around that time by related captains on East Main Street. McGilvery was one of five brothers, all of whom became sea captains. He was also politically active, serving in the state legislature, and owned shipbuilding interests as far up the Penobscot River as Brewer.

== See also ==
- National Register of Historic Places listings in Waldo County, Maine
