= Pink Palace =

Pink Palace may refer to:

== United States ==
- Jayne Mansfield's Pink Palace, Los Angeles, California
- 363 Copa De Oro Road, Los Angeles, California
- Don CeSar, a hotel in St. Petersburg Beach, Florida
- Royal Hawaiian Hotel, Honolulu, Hawaii
- A house in Louisville, Kentucky; see St. James-Belgravia Historic District § The Pink Palace
- Pink Palace Museum and Planetarium, Memphis, Tennessee
- Lake Stevens High School, in Lake Stevens, Washington
- Pink Palace (Washington, D.C.), a house listed on the National Register of Historic Places in Washington, D.C.

== Other places ==
- A 1970s–1980s nightclub in present-day Victoria Park Golf Clubhouse, Brisbane, Australia
- Ahsan Manzil, a palace in central Dhaka, Bangladesh
- Ontario Legislative Building, Toronto, Ontario, Canada
- Hawa Mahal, a palace in Jaipur, India
