= Julian Clifford Holmes =

American physicist (1930–2012)

Julian Clifford Holmes (November 20, 1930 – December 16, 2012) was an American physicist, rocket scientist, inventor, political activist and environmental gadfly.

Holmes was born in Portland, Maine. The son of mathematics teachers Cecil T. and Marion C. Holmes, he studied physics at Bowdoin College, from which he was hired in 1951, by the Rocketry Division of the United States Naval Research Laboratory (NRL) in Washington, D.C, where he spent his entire career, retiring as a GS 14 Government physicist on December 30, 1985.

At NRL, Holmes’ career evolved with the Cold War. He developed countermeasure sensors for detecting distant nuclear events, and designed aeronomy instrumentation for the Navy's Aerobee class of scientific rockets during the Navy's technological transition from cathode ray tube electronics to solid-state electronics. He also developed formulas for interpreting data captured by these rockets' returning payloads, bringing a better understanding of the nature of the earth's ionosphere, and of the effects of solar fluxes and manmade chemicals on it.

In the course of his work, Holmes was awarded six patents for inventions relating to electronic countermeasures, development of instrumentation for the Aerobee rocket series, and for interpretation of data from Aerobee and other rockets.

In addition to his scientific and engineering achievements, Holmes was a citizen activist, stimulating reforms in rural Maryland county zoning laws in the 1960s and 1970s. Holmes used Grand juries to investigate corruption in the 1980s. In 1993 Holmes returned to Maine with companion Audrey Marra. There he helped enact a ban on the sale of controversial gasoline additive MTBE in that state. He became an advocate for forestry reform and island conservation, playing a key role in the rejection of an industrial port on pristine Sears Island in Penobscot Bay.

Holmes died in Lewiston, Maine on December 16, 2012.
