= Joanna Carver Colcord =

American social worker and author

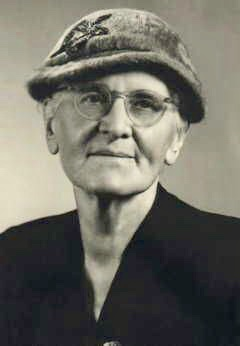
- Born: March 18, 1882; Southwest Pacific Ocean
- Died: April 8, 1960 (aged 78); Lebanon, Indiana
- Burial place: Elmwood Cemetery, Searsport, Maine
- Education: University of Maine; New York School of Social Work
- Occupation: Social worker
- Spouse: Frank J. Bruno (married 1950)
- Parents: Lincoln Alden Colcord (father); Jane Colcord (mother)

Joanna Carver Colcord (March 18, 1882 – April 8, 1960) was a pioneering American social worker, and author. Born at sea, she was also notable for publishing texts on the language, work songs, and sea shanties of American seamen during the early 20th century.

== Early life ==
Both of Colcord's parents, Jane French (Sweetser) and Captain Lincoln Alden Colcord, came from Maine families with generations-long traditions of life on and around the sea. Lincoln Alden Colcord delivered his daughter Joanna on board his sailing ship, the Charlotte A. Littlefield, in the southwest Pacific near New Caledonia. The ship left Newcastle, New South Wales and was sailing to Yokohama, Japan.

Aside from time spent on shore at Penobscot Bay or in Searsport, Maine, Joanna and her younger brother, Lincoln Ross Colcord, spent most of their childhood at sea.

== Education and early career ==
Jane Colcord tutored her children at sea, and Joanna's high school education was by correspondence course. She also became adept at geography and mathematics through first-hand experience aboard the ship. She would recall later that in addition to these subjects, she also learned concepts such as racial equality, self-control, orderliness, and a sense of duty.

Beginning in 1902, Joanna studied at the University of Maine, receiving her B.S. in chemistry in 1906 and M.S. in biological chemistry in 1909.

Colcord was unsatisfied with the positions available to her in applied chemistry, and a former teacher suggested she consider social service. In 1910–1911, she studied social work at the New York School of Philanthropy, later known as the New York School of Social Work.

== Career in social work ==
Colcord’s career began in 1911 with a position at the New York Charity Organization Society (COS). During her time there, she also worked with the American Red Cross in the Virgin Islands from 1920 to 1921. In 1925, she left the COS to become General Secretary of the Minnesota Family Welfare Association. In 1929, she became the head of the Charity Organization Division at the Russell Sage Foundation in New York, a position she held until 1945. She was an advocate of professional training and standards in her field, as well as scientific research and administration. During the Great Depression she advocated for private social work to support federal relief and welfare provisions, and during the New Deal, she became a liaison between private social work and the federal government’s welfare and relief administrators. She eventually became critical of certain aspects of the Roosevelt administration's categorical approach to relief, raising concerns about issues in public provision and other related areas.

== Late life ==
Health problems, including circulatory problems and diabetes, forced Colcord to retire in 1944. In November 1950, she married longtime friend and colleague Frank J. Bruno, a professor of applied sociology at Washington University in St. Louis who had become a widower several months before. After Bruno's death in 1955, Colcord moved to Lebanon, Indiana to live with her stepson. She died there in 1960 from a stroke.

== Works ==
Colcord had a successful career as an author on the culture of seafaring as well as in social work. In 1924, she published a compilation of American sea songs, Roll and Go: Songs of American Sailormen, and in 1938, a greatly expanded edition published as Songs of American Sailormen). In 1945 she published Sea Language Comes Ashore, and she was also the author of various articles published in the maritime journal The American Neptune.

=== Social work ===
- Colcord, Joanna C. (1919). Broken Homes: A Study of Family Desertion and its Social Treatment. New York: Russell Sage Foundation. OCLC 1347284 – via Internet Archive.
- ——; Mann, Ruth Z.S., eds. (1930). The Long View: Papers and Addresses by Mary E. Richmond. New York: Russell Sage Foundation. OCLC 954737057 – via Internet Archive.
- —— (1930). Community Planning in Unemployment Emergencies. New York: Russell Sage Foundation. OCLC 981447781.
- —— (1931). Setting Up a Program of Work Relief. New York: Russell Sage Foundation. OCLC 2868553.
- ——; Johnston, Mary (1933). Community Programs for Subsistence Gardens. New York: Russell Sage Foundation. OCLC 1720398.
- —— (1936). Cash Relief. New York: Russell Sage Foundation. OCLC 502857.
- —— (1939). Your Community: Its Provisions for Health, Education, Safety, and Welfare. New York: Russell Sage Foundation. OCLC 718442590.

=== Life at sea ===
- Colcord, Joanna C. (1924). Roll and Go: Songs of American Sailormen. Introduction by Lincoln Colcord. London: Heath Cranton Ltd. OCLC 21050785.
- —— (1938) [1924]. Songs of American Sailormen. Introduction by Lincoln Colcord (enlarged and revised ed.). New York: W.W. Norton. OCLC 946498851.
- —— (July 1942). "Domestic Life on American Sailing Ships". American Neptune. 2 (3): 193–202.
- —— (1945). Sea Language Comes Ashore. New York: Cornell Maritime Press. OCLC 1034773.
- —— (2003). Letters From Sea: Joanna and Lincoln Colcord’s Seafaring Childhood. Parker Bishop Albee Jr. (editor). Thomaston: Tilbury House.
