= 363 Copa De Oro Road =

The Pink Palace
- Location within Western Los Angeles
- Former names: 363 Copa De Oro Road

General information
- Type: House
- Architectural style: French Country
- Location: East Gate Bel Air, Los Angeles, 363 Copa De Oro Rd, Los Angeles, CA 90077
- Coordinates: 34°04′57″N 118°26′28″W
- Completed: 1940

Technical details
- Floor area: 11,817 sq ft (1,097.8 m^{2})

Design and construction
- Architect: Gerard Colcord

363 Copa De Oro Road, often referred to as The Pink Palace, is a luxurious red-brick mock 18th-century French mansion on Copa De Oro Road in the affluent East Gate Bel Air neighborhood in the hills of Los Angeles, California. It lies in very close proximity to Château des Fleurs and Bel-Air Country Club and is noted for being the home of numerous celebrities including Dean Martin, Tom Jones and Nicolas Cage.

== Location ==
The house is situated in East Gate Bel Air on Copa De Oro Road ('cup of gold' in Spanish), which was "coined to reflect the millionaire status of its inhabitants". Copa De Oro Road was named in 2015 as one of the "15 Priciest Streets in America", with a median home value estimated at US$10.264 million.

== History ==
The house was the home of Dean Martin in the 1960s and early 1970s. In 1966, during a concert at the Sands Hotel and Casino in Las Vegas, Sinatra mentioned the house and the "evenings of fun" that he, Martin, and others would have. Sinatra joked that they would drink until 3:30 am and then eat dinner and be dragged into the dining room lying on their backs by Martin's mother-in-law Peggy and a "big dog."

Martin sold the house to Sir Tom Jones for $500,000 in June 1976. Jones resold it to Nicolas Cage in 1998 for a reported $6.469 million. It has since been valued as high as $35 million since going on the market in 2007, but as of 2015, it is worth $10.4 million.

The house was purchased by real estate developer Jason Grosfeld, whose father, James Grosfeld, is one of the largest shareholders in BlackRock and was on the board for Pulte Homes. At the time of purchase, Jason Grosfeld was involved in a failed development project with Donald Trump in Hawaii. Currently, he is the developer of Costa Palmas in Cabo San Lucas, Mexico.

== Architecture ==
The red-brick property, 11,817 square feet (1,097.8 m^{2}) in size, was built in 1940 by Gerard Colcord. It has six bedrooms and nine bathrooms. The house was built in the 18th century country house style, and is noted for its polished wooden paneling in the interior. When Tom Jones purchased the property in 1976 he had all of his furniture from Weybridge shipped over and stepped up security by installing electronic gates, "adorned with Welsh dragons".
