= Moose Point State Park =

State park in Waldo County, Maine

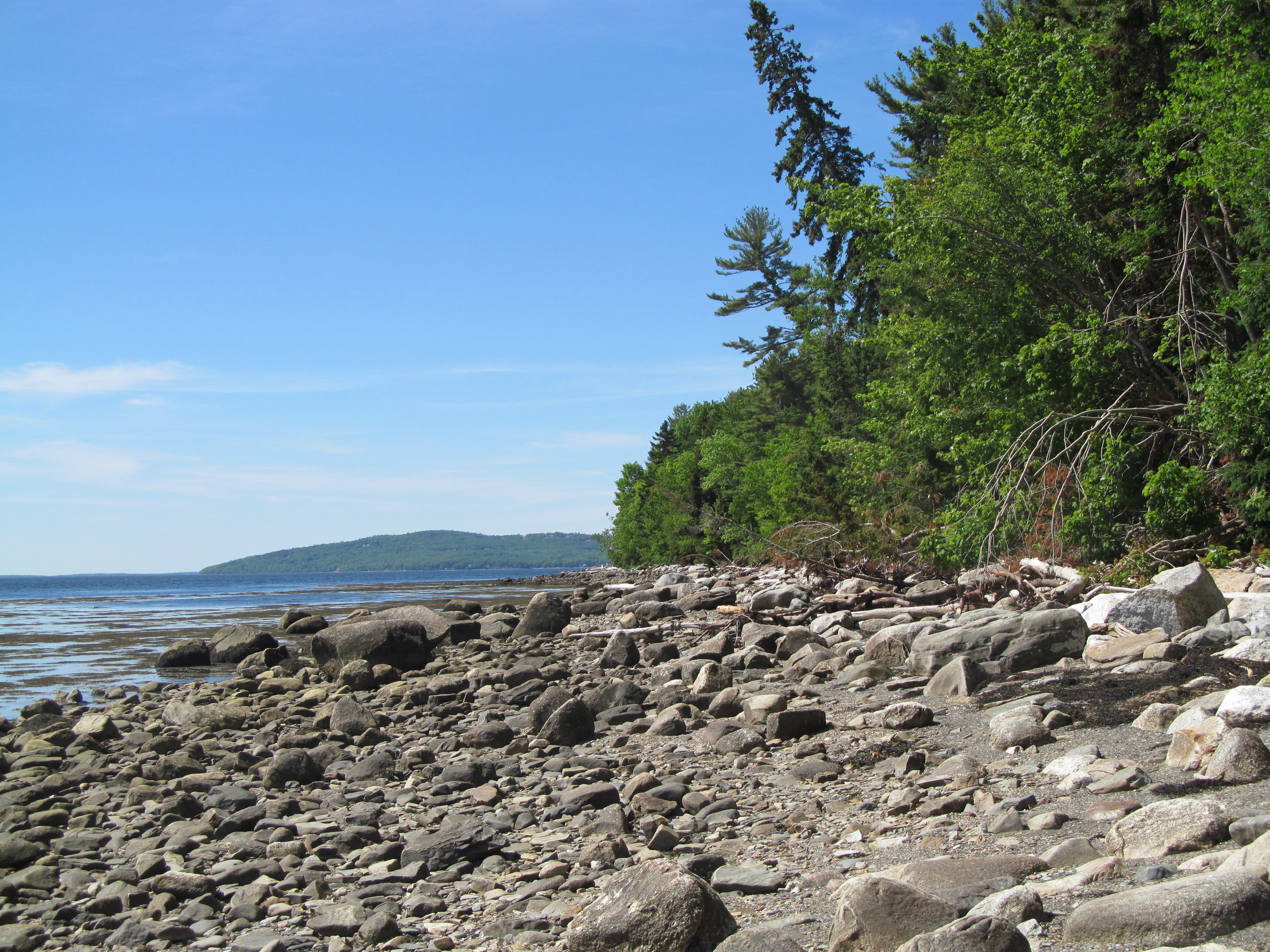

- Location within Maine
- Interactive map of Moose Point State Park
- Location: Searsport, Maine, United States
- Coordinates: 44°25′22″N 68°56′52″W
- Area: 146 acres (59 ha)
- Elevation: 0 ft (0 m)
- Established: 1952
- Administrator: Maine Department of Agriculture, Conservation and Forestry
- Website: Official website
- Maine State Parks

Moose Point State Park is a day-use public recreation area overlooking Penobscot Bay in Searsport, Maine, located off U.S. Route 1 near the Belfast town line. The state park features panoramic views, hiking trails, tidal pools, and picnicking facilities.

== History ==
The park was developed as a dairy farm by the Carver family in 1859. At one point, the 186-acre property had a house, barn, two silos, and sixty head of cattle. After most of the buildings burned down in 1927, the descendants of Captain George A. Carver offered the land to the State of Maine as a park in 1952. It opened in 1963.

== Gallery ==
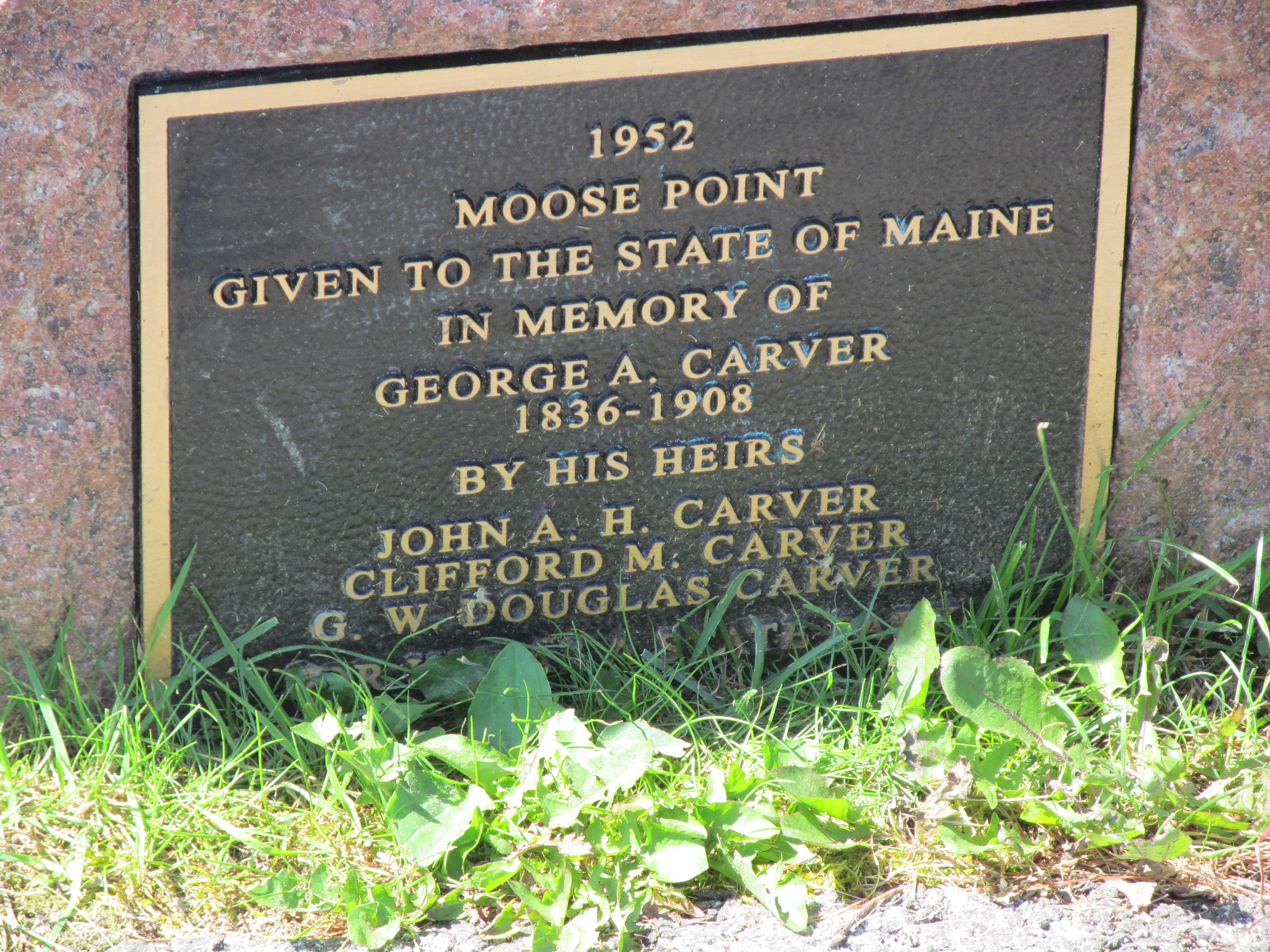
Memorial plaque

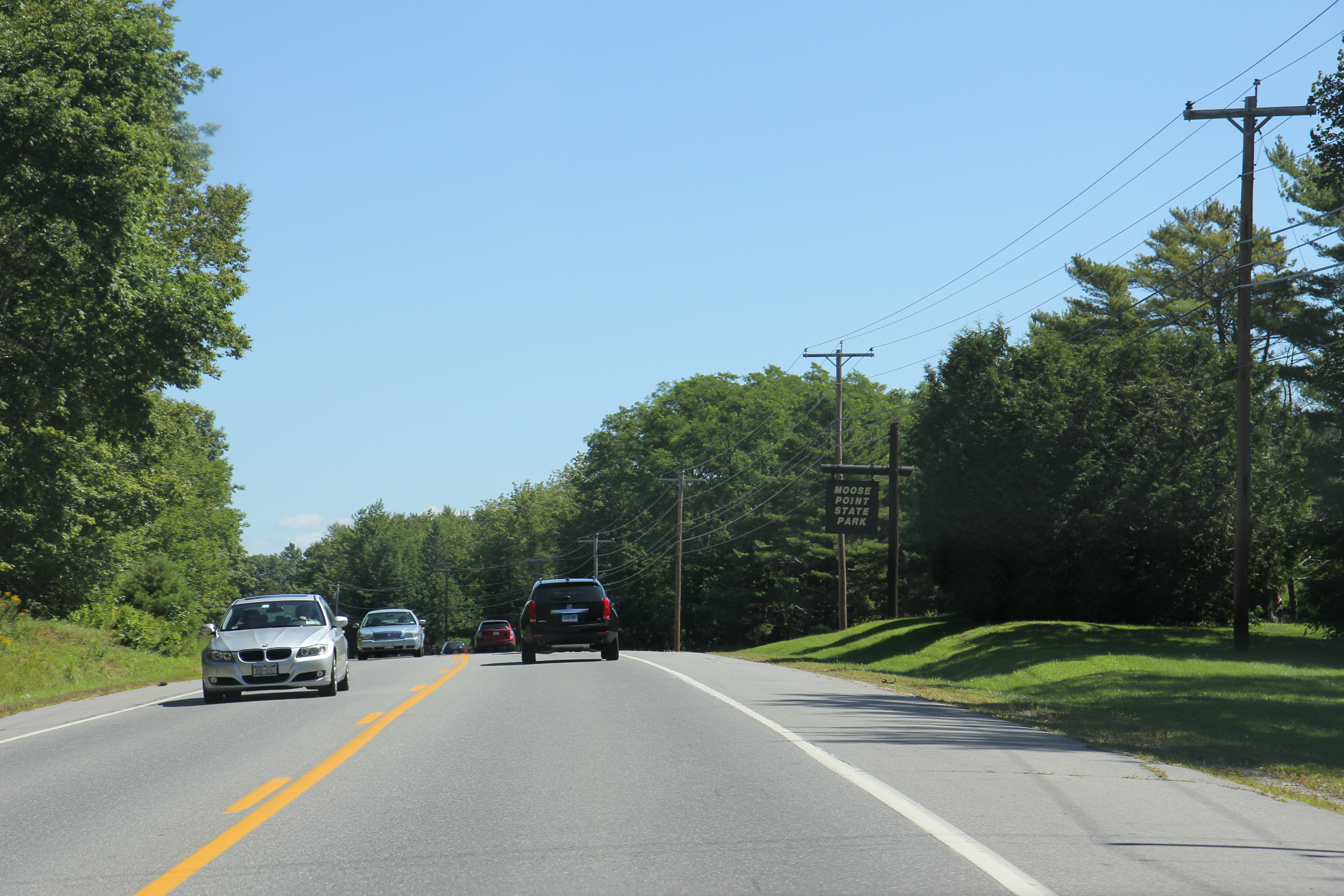
Sign on US1
