= Sears Isle Nuclear Power Plant =

Cancelled nuclear power plant in Maine, United States

Sears Island Nuclear Power Plant was a nuclear power plant proposed by Central Maine Power in 1974 as a single 1,150 MW nuclear reactor built by Westinghouse. It was to be built on Sears Island in Maine, but the project was canceled in 1977.

== See also ==
- Nuclear power debate
- List of canceled nuclear plants in the United States
