= Searsport Historic District =

Historic district in Maine, United States

- U.S. National Register of Historic Places
- U.S. Historic district
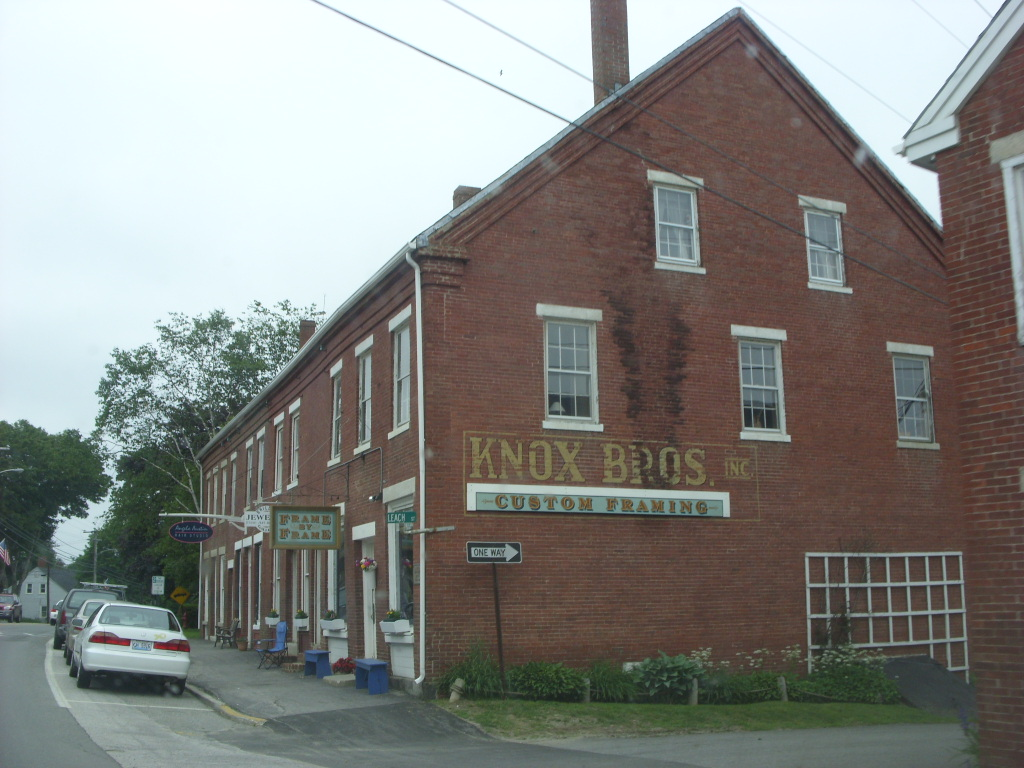

- Location within Maine Location within the United States
- Location: Main St., Searsport, Maine
- Coordinates: 44°27′30″N 68°55′33″W
- Area: 4 acres (1.6 ha)
- Built: 1834
- Architectural style: Greek Revival, Italianate, Federal
- NRHP reference No.: 79000168
- Added to NRHP: July 27, 1979

The Searsport Historic District encompasses a collection of well-preserved mid-to-late 19th-century commercial buildings in the center of Searsport, Maine. They represent the community's peak period of prosperity, when it was a leading shipping and shipbuilding center. The district was listed on the National Register of Historic Places in 1979.

== Description and history ==
The area that is now Searsport was settled in the 1750s, and was incorporated as a separate town out of adjacent towns in 1845. From the 1790s its main village was a regional shipping and shipbuilding center. At its peak in the mid-19th century it had six full-time shipyards and numerous seasonal ones, and had achieved a reputation for providing captains for many seafaring vessels. The success of these businesses and men led to the development of a significant portion of the town center's commercial buildings.

The historic district extends along a short portion of Searsport's Main Street, designated United States Route 1. On the south side it extends from Mosman Street to Elm, and on the north from Mt. Ephraim Road to Knox Bros. Avenue. This area has thirteen historically significant buildings, most of them of brick construction, and built between 1840 and 1891. The only non-commercial building is the 1840 Greek Revival Methodist Church. The most common architectural styles are the Greek Revival and the Italianate style. Probably the most elaborate building is the 1891 Merrill Trust Company building, a mansard-roofed Italianate structure with a tower at the center of its front.

== See also ==
- National Register of Historic Places listings in Waldo County, Maine
