= Anna L. Colcord =

American writer and editor (1864–1950)

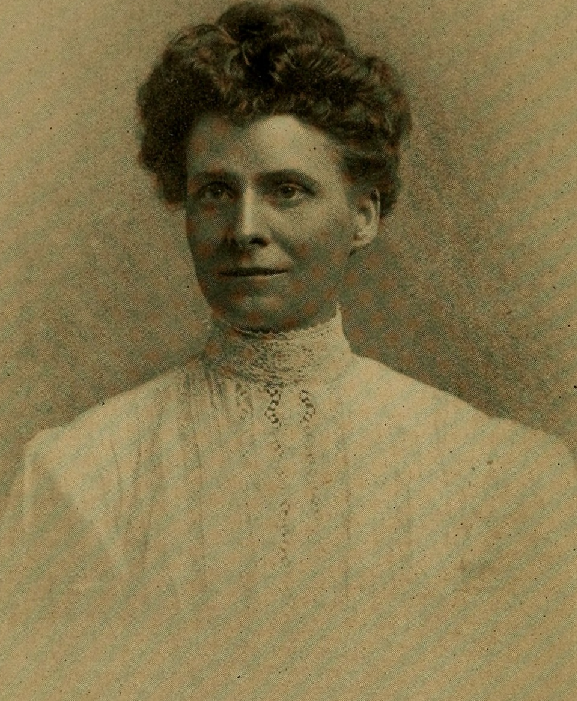
- Colcord in 1908
- Born: Anna Letitia Guise; March 7, 1864 Sacramento, California, U.S.
- Died: May 28, 1950 (aged 86) Washington, D.C., U.S.
- Resting place: George Washington Cemetery, Adelphi, Maryland
- Occupation: Writer; editor
- Period: 1889–1919
- Notable works: A Friend in the Kitchen (1889)
- Spouse: William Alan Colcord (m. 1882; died 1935)
- Children: 4

Anna Letitia Colcord (née Guise; March 7, 1864 – May 28, 1950) was an American writer and editor. She published the vegetarian cookbook A Friend in the Kitchen in 1889 and later prepared an Australian edition while working with the Seventh-day Adventist Church. The book went through multiple editions and was translated into several languages. After returning to the United States, Colcord worked as a book editor in Washington, D.C. She later became involved in a copyright dispute with the Seventh-day Adventist Review and Herald Publishing Association over her manuscript One Hundred Bible Stories.

== Biography ==
=== Early and personal life ===
Anna Letitia Guise was born in Sacramento, California, on March 7, 1864. She married William Alan Colcord (1860–1935) in Jefferson, Iowa, on September 28, 1882. They had three sons and one daughter. Soon after their marriage, Colcord and her husband joined the Seventh-day Adventist Church in Iowa.

=== Career ===
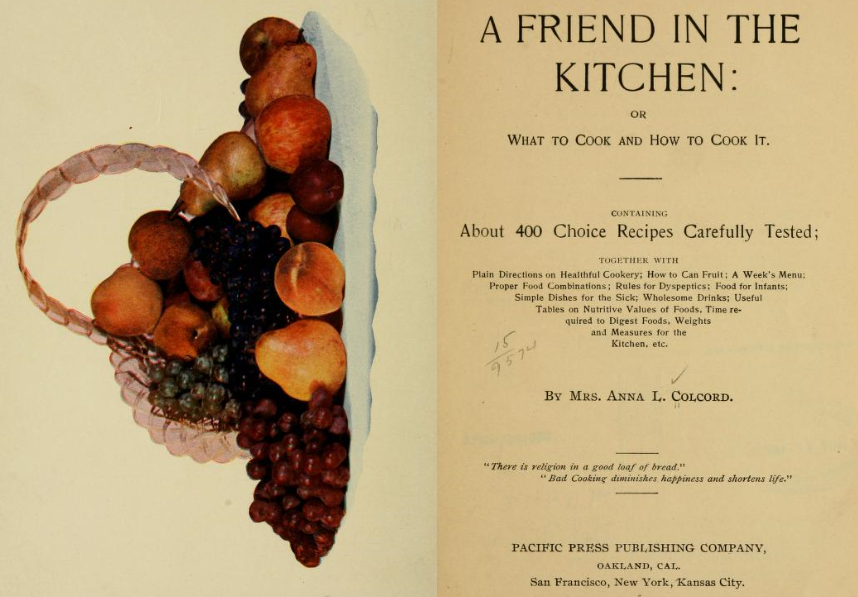
Title page of A Friend in the Kitchen (1889)

In 1889, Colcord published the vegetarian cookbook A Friend in the Kitchen. In 1893, when her husband was appointed to work for the Seventh-day Adventist Church in Australia, she moved there with him and two of their children. The couple worked as missionaries and teachers for the church.

While in Australia, Colcord prepared a new edition of A Friend in the Kitchen, containing 400 recipes as well as illustrations and cartoons promoting a vegetarian diet. The book was later translated into several languages and was also published in the United States. According to a 1922 report, it had appeared in 18 editions and sold 200,000 copies. Further editions ceased after Colcord left the church in 1914.

In 1902, Colcord returned to the United States. She moved to Washington, D.C., in 1904, where she worked as a book editor for new authors.

=== Copyright dispute ===
Colcord later sued the Seventh-day Adventist Review and Herald Publishing Association over the use of her manuscript One Hundred Bible Stories. In April 1913, she had allowed the work to be included in a denominational book under conditions that included authorship credit, but her credit was removed before publication in 1914. The book was distributed in 25,000 copies over six years, despite Colcord's objections. The case was heard by the Supreme Court of the District of Columbia.

By March 1922, the dispute had ended without a definitive ruling in Colcord's favor. Colcord retained the copyright to her original work, while both parties incurred financial losses during the litigation.

=== Death ===
Colcord died at the Washington Sanitarium on May 28, 1950. She was buried at George Washington Cemetery in Adelphi, Maryland.

== Publications ==
- A Friend in the Kitchen: Or, What to Cook and How to Cook It (1889)
- One Hundred Bible Stories and Where to Find Them (1914)
- Uplift Poems (1919)

== See also ==
- Christian vegetarianism
- History of vegetarianism
- Women and vegetarianism and veganism advocacy
