= Colcord Farmstead =

- U.S. National Register of Historic Places
- U.S. Historic district
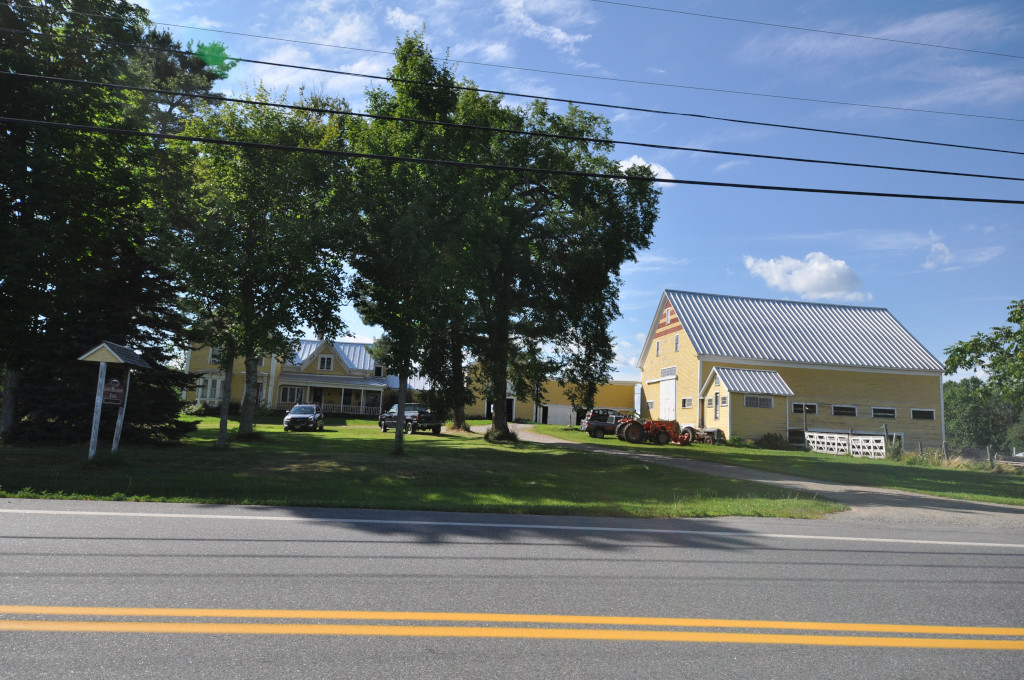

- Location within Maine Location within the United States
- Location: Unity Rd., Benton, Maine
- Coordinates: 44.3548°N 69.3222°W
- Built: 1800s
- NRHP reference No.: 05001468
- Added to NRHP: December 29, 2005

The Colcord Farmstead, now Longmeadows Farm, is an historic farm property at 184 Unity Road in Benton, Maine, USA. With a development origin in 1786, it is recognized architecturally for its farmstead complex, a fine example of late 19th-century agricultural architecture. It was added to the National Register of Historic Places on December 29, 2005.

== Description and history ==
Longmeadows Farm occupies about 194 acres (79 ha) of land in central Benton, bounded on the west by the Sebasticook River, and extending eastward across Unity Road (Maine State Route 139). The farm complex stands just west of the road, and consists of a collection of wood-frame buildings, most of which were built after 1880. The house, built in 1882 by John Colcord, is a 2 1/2-story wood-frame structure with Italianate styling. It has a gabled roof whose eaves are decorated with paired brackets, and is sheathed in clapboard siding. The interior retains period high quality woodwork, including original floors, plaster walls, and mouldings.

The house is connected via two structures, now called the shop and shed, to the barn. The shop is the oldest structure on the farm, dating to the early 19th century. The barn is a large three-story bank barn, with a high stone foundation, and was built by John Colcord out of sawn and hand-hewn timbers. Other buildings in the farm complex include 20th-century structures for milking, equipment storage, and a chicken house; there is also a windmill and c. 1950 sawmill on the property.

Most of the land that makes up the farm was sold as a unit in 1786 by the Kennebec Proprietors, the area's first landowners. Unlike many surviving historic farms, this one did not have a long period of ownership by a single family until the 20th century, passing through thirteen owners in its history up to the start of the 21st century. Its present farm complex is largely the work of either John Colcord, who owned the property in the late 19th century, or the Brown family, who have owned it since 1937.

== See also ==
- National Register of Historic Places in Kennebec County, Maine
