= Colcord, West Virginia =

Unincorporated community in West Virginia, United States

- Unincorporated community and Census-designated place
- Location within West Virginia Location within the United States
- Coordinates: 37°56′42″N 81°26′15″W
- Country: United States
- State: West Virginia
- County: Raleigh
- Elevation: 1,060 ft (320 m)
- Time zone: UTC-5 (Eastern (EST))
  - Summer (DST): UTC-4 (EDT)
- ZIP code: 25048
- Area codes: 304 & 681
- GNIS feature ID: 2807505

Colcord is an unincorporated community in Raleigh County, West Virginia, United States. As of the 2020 census, Colcord had a population of 148. Colcord is 5.5 miles (8.9 km) east-southeast of Whitesville. Colcord had a post office, which closed on November 30, 2002. The community was named after the proprietor of the Colcord Coal Company.
