= Sears Island =

Tidal island in Maine, United States

Native name: Wassumkeag
- Interactive map of Sears Island

Geography
- Location: Penobscot Bay
- Coordinates: 44°26′35″N 68°52′39″W
- Area: 940 acres (380 ha)
- Highest elevation

Administration
- United States
- State: Maine
- Town: Searsport

Additional information
- Time zone: Eastern (EST) (UTC-5)
  - Summer (DST): EDT (UTC-4)

Sears Island, known as Wassumkeag or shining beach by the indigenous Wabanaki tribes of northern New England, is located off the coast of Searsport in Waldo County, Maine, at the top of Penobscot Bay. The island is the largest undeveloped, uninhabited, causeway-accessible island on the eastern coast of the United States. It is 940 acres (3.8 km^{2}) in area. It is part of the Town of Searsport.

== History and geography ==
It was named after David Sears of Boston after he agreed to grant a large sum of money towards founding of Searsport. Sears Island is state-owned land, but is part of the town of Searsport. It used to be known as Brigadier's Island.

A causeway was built in the 1980s upon what had been a tidal bar. At high tide Sears Island was a true island, and at low tide the exposed gravel bar allowed for easy access. Locals would drive over at low tide, always careful to return in time, lest they have to wade or swim and leave the car stranded until the next tide. There were farms on the island from the mid-18th century until the last vacant farm was removed in 1934. Only stone cellar holes and a few small fields remain today.

Sears Island acts as an element barrier for one of the most well-protected harbors in the state of Maine: Stockton Harbor, an attractive anchorage for not only the protection it offers, but also its convenience to upper Penobscot Bay towns Searsport, Belfast and Castine. Bar Harbor is about an hour's car ride east, and both Camden and Bangor are about a half-hour south and north, respectively. Sears Island also has views of Cape Jellison.

It is home to a number of species of birds, mammals, fish, amphibians and plant life. The shallow shoal off the west side of the island supports meadows of eelgrass (Zostera marina) and other nursery habitats and features that play an important role in the fish and shellfish populations of greater Penobscot Bay.

== Environmental controversies ==
The possible industrial development of the island has been a point of controversy for many years. Writer E. B. White, a resident of nearby Brooklin, Maine, noted in a 1975 essay for the New Yorker that he had attended an evening forum about a Central Maine Power Company proposal to construct a nuclear power plant on Sears Island. White reported to New Yorker readers that the Central Maine Power Company "feels very good about nuclear generating plants, is not worried about radiation or accidents." In response to a goat farmer, their spokesman acknowledged radioactive "iodine can contaminate milk... [b]ut he was cheerful about the prospect. You would simply put the animals on a controlled diet, he said, and after about forty days the radioactivity would be gone." Facing local opposition, the plant was not built.

Since the 1980s, successive Maine governors have promoted development of the island as a general cargo port (Joseph Brennan; John McKernan) a wood-chip port; (Angus King) an LNG terminal; (John Baldacci, 1st term), and an intermodal freight transport hub for global container ship traffic (Baldacci's 2nd term). In response, the Sierra Club of New England waged a seven-year struggle in federal courts in the mid-1980s and early 1990s to keep Sears Island free of development. Key cases included: Sierra Club v. Marsh, (1985), Sierra Club v. Secretary of Transportation. (1985) , Sierra Club v. Marsh (1989) and Sierra Club v. Marsh (1992)

A three-year-long consensus-driven effort by Maine Department of Transportation (MDOT) and its Sears Island Joint Use Planning Committee culminated on January 22, 2009, in the signing by Maine transportation commissioner David Cole and by Maine Coast Heritage Trust President Paul Gallay of a perpetual conservation easement granting Maine Coast Heritage Trust control of 600 acres (240 ha) of the island, while leaving the remaining 340 acres (140 ha) of the island open to port development.

The conservation easement is managed by The Friends of Sears Island.

On February 19, 2009, however, Penobscot Bay environmental activist Ron Huber filed an 80-C appeal in Maine Superior Court "to rescind the Jan. 22, 2009, conservation easement until the MDOT has fully complied with the requirements of the Maine Sensible Transportation Policy Act and the Maine Site Location of Development Law." Huber's suit was joined separately by Augusta resident Douglass H. Watts and by Searsport resident Harlan McLaughlin. Maine Superior Court Justice Jeffrey Hjelm reviewed the cases. On May 14, 2009, Hjelm consolidated the three cases. On September 8, 2010, Justice Hjelm dismissed all three cases as premature, concluding that the current lack of port development, and lack of any interest in port development by the Plaintifs, made the injury theoretical and impossible to evaluate: the Plaintiffs as yet lacked demonstrable standing to sue.

On December 17, 2010 Plaintiff Huber appealed Hjelm's decision to the Maine Supreme Judicial Court. On May 3, 2011, the Maine Supreme Judicial Court affirmed Superior Court Justice Hjelm's decision.

In March 2020, Governor Janet Mills identified the Port of Searsport as a leading site in Maine to support the transportation, assembly and fabrication of offshore wind turbines and called for a study to further analyze this opportunity. The study was released in 2021 and included Sears Island as a viable site for the wind turbine facility. The existing Port of Searsport at Mack Point, a "brownfield" site was also assessed. This proposed use of the island has been opposed by environmental and land preservation groups.

On February 20, 2024, Governor Janet Mills announced that Sears Island was the preferred site for an offshore wind power port in the area. The backlash from some was that Sears Island was next to another contender for the port, Mack Point (Which had previously been industrially developed) which could have been chosen rather than Sears Island, which is used for recreational use. The wind port is to be built on the 1/3 of the island belonging to the Maine Department of Transportation. The Mills Administration said, "For more than two years, my Administration has evaluated Sears Island and Mack Point thoroughly and with an open mind, recognizing that each site has its own set of benefits and its own set of drawbacks. In carefully considering all of these, I believe that, on balance, Sears Island is the best choice for an offshore wind port because it is already owned by the state, designated for the purpose of port development, will cost less in the short-term and long-term, and is expected to result in less environmental harm", adding, "the parcel on Sears Island fundamentally makes the most sense and provides us with the best opportunity to responsibly advance offshore wind in Maine

== Uses ==
Visitors can drive out to the end of the causeway, and despite the presence of a road traveling down the center of the island to the southern tip, they may not actually drive on the island itself, as it is blocked off by large concrete blocks and fencing. Visitors however, may walk, hike, bike, and explore the island, by the road — approximately1-mile (1.6 km) long — which has views of Penobscot Bay, Cape Rosier/Castine, and Islesboro Island), and by the many walking trails that zig-zag their way around the island. Beaches surround the perimeter of the island. Friends of Sears Island is a comprehensive source of information about the Island.

== See also ==
- List of islands of Maine
