= Gerard Colcord =

American architect (1900–1984)

Gerard Colcord (1900–1984) was an American architect. He designed over 300 residences and 100 residential remodels in California.

== Biography ==
=== Early life ===
He was born in St. Louis, Missouri, on November 1, 1900. He was educated in the United States and Europe, and moved to Los Angeles, California, in 1924.

=== Career ===
He designed private residences in Beverly Hills, California, and in Bel Air, Los Angeles. In 1930, he designed the Trippet House in Pacific Palisades, California. In 1952, he converted a morning room into a screening room in the Beverly Hills residence of film screenwriter and producer Jerry Wald (1911-1962). The Horton house in Bel Air was the private residence of stand-up comedian and actor Bob Newhart (1929–2024) for twenty years. His Harris house in Bel Air has been the residence of actors Dean Martin (1917-1995) and Nicolas Cage. Shortly before his death in 1984, he was remodeling Harrison Ford's house in Brentwood, Los Angeles.

He was known as "Hollywood's society architect," designing traditional homes and shying away from Modernism.

=== Personal life ===
He resided in Encino, Los Angeles. He died on February 19, 1984, in Ventura County, California.

== Bibliography ==
=== Secondary source ===
- Bret Parsons, Colcord: Home (Angel City Press, 2008)
