= The American Neptune =

The American Neptune: A Quarterly Journal of Maritime History and Arts was an academic journal covering American maritime history from its establishment in 1941 until it ceased publication in 2002.

== History ==
Established by Samuel Eliot Morison and Walter Muir Whitehill, the Peabody Museum of Salem published the journal from 1941 to 1992. In 1992-93, it was jointly published by the Peabody and the Essex Museums, and from 1993 until 2002 by the successor organization, the Peabody Essex Museum. The journal was originally subtitled as "A Quarterly Journal of Maritime History" and later in 1995 added "and Arts".

The American Neptune's final issue was Volume 62, number 1 (Winter 2002). After a hiatus, it was succeeded by Northern Mariner.
