= Penobscot Marine Museum =

- U.S. National Register of Historic Places
- U.S. Historic district
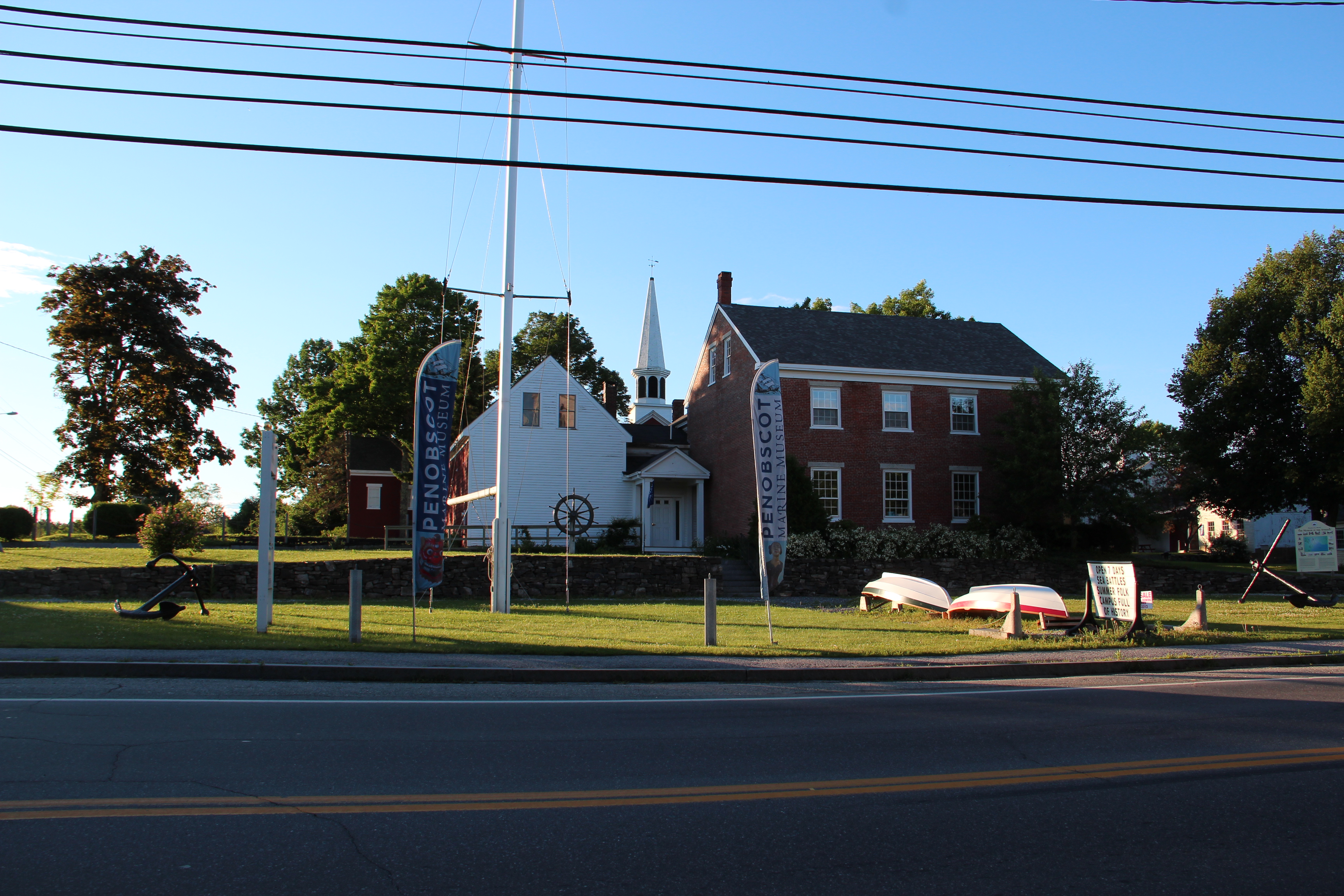
- Penobscot Marine Museum

- Location within Maine Location within the United States
- Location: Church St; Searsport, Maine
- Coordinates: 44°27′33″N 68°55′30″W
- Area: 3.1 acres (1.3 ha)
- Architectural style: Greek Revival
- NRHP reference No.: 70000088 (original); 97001133 (increase)

Significant dates
- Added to NRHP: July 1, 1970
- Boundary increase: September 26, 1997

The Penobscot Marine Museum in Searsport, Maine, United States, is Maine's oldest maritime museum and is designed to preserve and educate people regarding Maine's and Searsport's rich and unique maritime and shipbuilding history. It was founded in 1936, and is located at 5 Church Street in the center of Searsport.

== Description ==
The museum campus is composed of two sections. The original heart of the campus is located on both sides of Church Street, and between Church and Reservoir Streets, just north of Main Street (United States Route 1). In addition to these buildings, the museum has expanded into three attached buildings on the north side of Main Street west of Knox Bros. Ave.

Designed as a unique 19th century seafaring village, the museum encompasses thirteen historic and modern buildings, houses a modern exhibit gallery features annual shows and is home to a regionally important library and archives focused on maritime history and regional genealogy. Eight of the museum's buildings are on the National Register of Historic Places, five as part of a listing dedicated to the museum, and three as part of the Searsport Historic District. Among the collections is a significant photographic archives that includes glass plate negatives documenting life in New England and New York from 1909 and 1947 taken by the Eastern Illustrating & Publishing Company. The photographs are being digitized and made available online for research and access.

== Campus buildings ==
- Admission Center
- Main Street Gallery
- Savage Education Center
- First Congregational Church of Searsport (active church on museum campus)
- Captain Jeremiah Merithew House (mid-19th century sea captain's home)
- Old Vestry
- Douglas and Margaret Carver Memorial Gallery
- Stephen Phillips Memorial Library
- Old Town Hall (1845)
- Duncan House
- Duncan Boat Barn
- Boat House
- Yard in the Yard
- Ross Carriage Barn
- Fowler-True-Ross Barn
- Fowler-True-Ross House (19th century)

== See also ==
- List of maritime museums in the United States
- Penobscot Bay
- Sears Island
- National Register of Historic Places listings in Waldo County, Maine
