= Searsport, Maine =

- Town
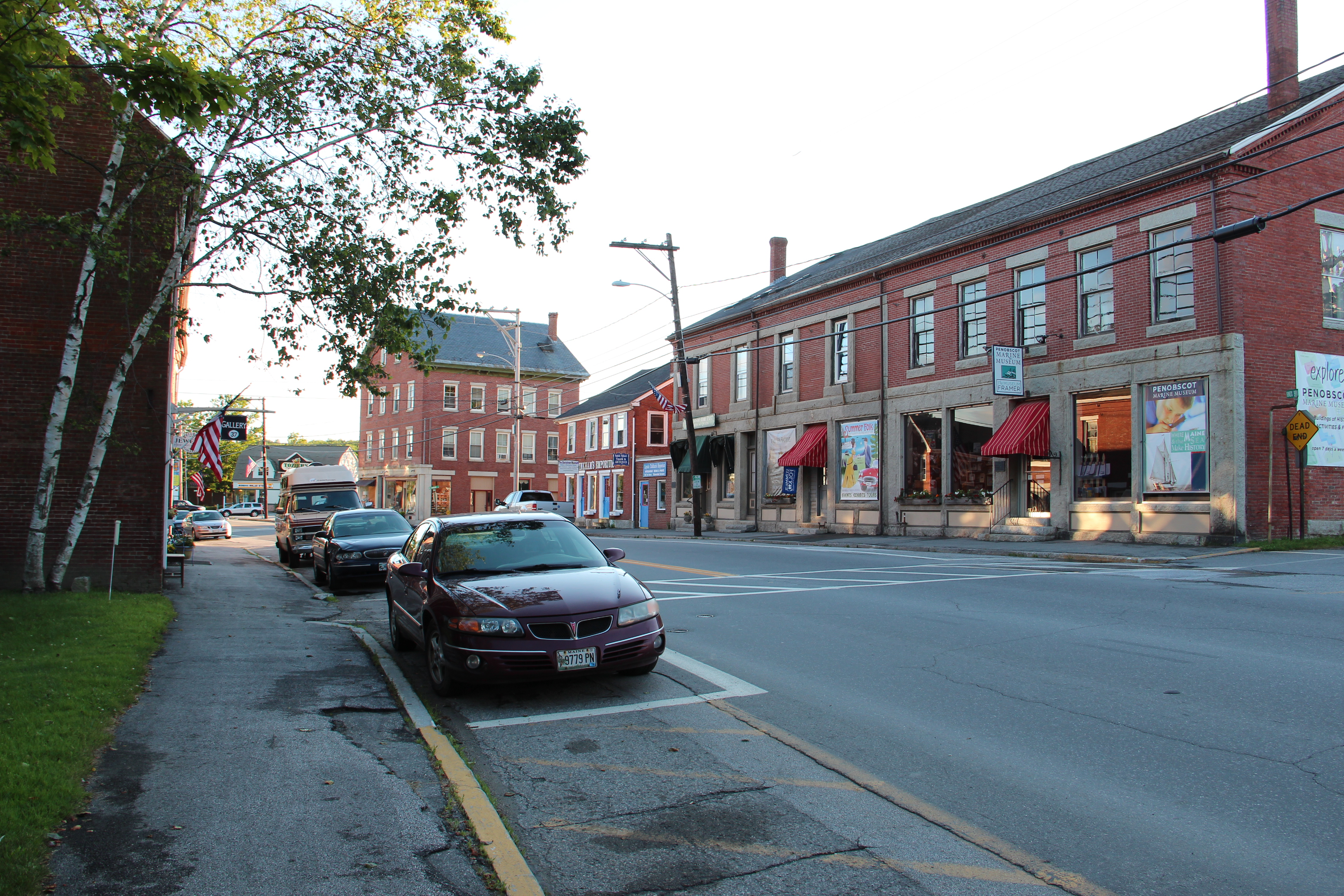
- Street in Searsport. The Penobscot Marine Museum is across the street.

- Logo

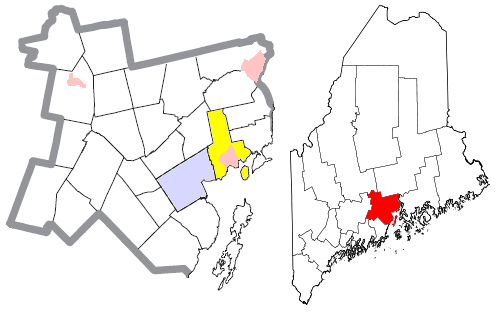
- Location of the town of Searsport (in yellow) in Waldo County and the state of Maine.
- Coordinates: 44°28′22″N 68°54′30″W
- Country: United States
- State: Maine
- County: Waldo
- Incorporated: 1845

Area
  - Total: 42.53 sq mi (110.15 km^{2})
  - Land: 28.65 sq mi (74.20 km^{2})
  - Water: 13.88 sq mi (35.95 km^{2})
- Elevation: 243 ft (74 m)

Population (2020)
  - Total: 2,649
  - Density: 92/sq mi (35.7/km^{2})
- Time zone: UTC-5 (Eastern (EST))
  - Summer (DST): UTC-4 (EDT)
- ZIP code: 04974
- Area code: 207
- FIPS code: 23-66635
- GNIS feature ID: 582716
- Website: www.searsport.maine.gov

Searsport is an incorporated town and deep water seaport located at the confluence of the Penobscot River estuary and the Penobscot Bay immediately northwest of Sears Island and Cape Jellison in Waldo County, Maine, United States. The population was 2,649 at the 2020 census. Searsport includes the village and North Searsport and census-designated place of Searsport. The town is known as "the home of the famous sea captains" and the "Antique Capital of Maine".

== History ==
Searsport was settled in the 1760s and incorporated on February 13, 1845, from portions of Prospect and Belfast. In 1747, when fire destroyed the Province House in Boston, General Samuel Waldo advocated, unsuccessfully, that the capital of Massachusetts be moved to Searsport, which was part of the Waldo Patent he had purchased about 1720. It was named after David Sears of Boston after he agreed to grant a large sum of money towards the town's founding. Searsport is noted for its rich maritime history. During the 19th century the port had 17 shipyards and built 200 ships, while supplying fully one-tenth of the United States' merchant marine deep water captains, per square mile more than any other community in the country. The Penobscot Marine Museum faithfully recalls this heritage.

== Port facilities ==
Searsport is Maine's second largest deep water port and is ideally located from the point of view of railroad, wood products and other development interests. Indeed, the town became the Penobscot Bay shipping terminus for the Northern Maine Seaport Railroad, a line opened in 1905 by the Bangor and Aroostook Railroad, which sent potatoes, timber and other products from here by boat, and loaded coal for use by its locomotives, without having to arrange rates with the Maine Central Railroad. Searsport harbor is an excellent sheltered anchorage, covering an area of roughly 2 by 3 miles (3 by 5km), with a controlling depth of 40 feet (12 m) at mean low water and an average tidal fluctuation of 10 feet (3.0 m). The railroad pier is 800 feet (240 m) long and 100 feet (30 m) wide, with belt conveyors to handle bagged cargo to and from four warehouses. Tracks running along either side of the pier can hold 24 railcars on the west side and twelve cars on the east side. Sprague pier is 614 feet (187 m) long, with an adjacent berth 850-foot (260 m) in length. Berths adjacent to the piers are dredged to a mean low water depth of 32 feet (9.8 m) and are connected to a turning basin by channels 500 feet (150 m) wide. The Searsport railway yard can hold 700 cars. The port facilities at Searsport were a preferred loading point for ammunition during World War II.

== Geography ==
According to the United States Census Bureau, the town has a total area of 42.53 square miles (110.15 km^{2}), of which 28.65 square miles (74.20 km^{2}) is land and 13.88 square miles (35.95 km^{2}) is water. Situated on Penobscot Bay, Searport is drained by Long Cove Brook and Mill Brook. It includes Sears Island, which is 940 acres (3.8 km^{2}) in area.

The town is crossed by U. S. Route 1 and Maine State Route 3. It borders the towns of Prospect and Stockton Springs to the northeast, Belfast to the southwest, Swanville to the northwest and Frankfort to the north.

== Demographics ==
Historical population
Census	Pop.	Note	%±
1850	2,208		—
1860	2,532		14.7%
1870	2,282		−9.9%
1880	2,322		1.8%
1890	1,693		−27.1%
1900	1,349		−20.3%
1910	1,444		7.0%
1920	1,373		−4.9%
1930	1,414		3.0%
1940	1,319		−6.7%
1950	1,457		10.5%
1960	1,838		26.1%
1970	1,951		6.1%
1980	2,309		18.3%
1990	2,602		12.7%
2000	2,641		1.5%
2010	2,615		−1.0%
2020	2,649		1.3%
U.S. Decennial Census

=== 2010 census ===
At the 2010 census, there were 2,615 people, 1,186 households and 715 families residing in the town. The population density was 91.3 per square mile (35.3/km^{2}). There were 1,510 housing units at an average density of 52.7 per square mile (20.3/km^{2}). The racial make-up of the town was 97.2% White, 0.5% African American, 0.8% Native American, 0.1% Asian, 0.2% Pacific Islander, and 1.2% from two or more races. Hispanic or Latino of any race were 0.9% of the population.

There were 1,186 households, of which 24.5% had children under the age of 18 living with them, 43.5% were married couples living together, 12.0% had a female householder with no husband present, 4.8% had a male householder with no wife present and 39.7% were non-families. 32.3% of all households were made up of individuals and 15.5% had someone living alone who was 65 years of age or older. The average household size was 2.20 and the average family size was 2.73.

The median age was 46.9 years. 19% of residents were under the age of 18, 6.5% were between the ages of 18 and 24, 22.2% were from 25 to 44, 33.5% were from 45 to 64 and 19% were 65 years of age or older. The sex make-up of the town was 47.7% male and 52.3% female.

=== 2000 census ===
At the 2000 census, there were 2,641 people, 1,130 households and 732 families residing in the town. The population density was 92.4 per square mile (35.7/km^{2}). There were 1,370 housing units at an average density of 47.9 per square mile (18.5/km^{2}). The racial make-up of the town was 98.07% White, 0.27% Black or African American, 0.72% Native American, 0.08% from other races, and 0.87% from two or more races. Hispanic or Latino of any race were 0.19% of the population.

There were 1,130 households, of which 27.6% had children under the age of 18 living with them, 51.2% were married couples living together, 10.0% had a female householder with no husband present and 35.2% were non-families. 28.7% of all households were made up of individuals and 13.4% had someone living alone who was 65 years of age or older. The average household size was 2.34 and the average family size was 2.86.

23.3% of the population were under the age of 18, 7.2% from 18 to 24, 25.7% from 25 to 44, 28.6% from 45 to 64 and 15.2% were 65 years of age or older. The median age was 41 years. For every 100 females, there were 91.4 males. For every 100 females age 18 and over, there were 87.1 males.

The median household income was $31,288 and the median family income was $38,333. Males had a median income of $31,629 and females $23,221. The per capita income was $18,883. About 11.3% of families and 13.4% of the population were below the poverty line, including 19.0% of those under age 18 and 11.0% of those age 65 or over.

== Government ==
Searsport's government is organized around a town meeting system and is characteristic of a New England town, with an annual town meeting held every March and special town meetings held at various times during the year. A five-member board of selectmen (with its members serving three-year terms) is elected on the Tuesday before the annual meeting and it, along with the town manager, run the town's daily affairs, including overseeing town water, sewage treatment, law enforcement, fire protection, emergency medical service, recreational programs and a library. The select board serves as the town's executive branch, while the town meeting serves as its legislative branch. The select board may not pass a budget or most ordinances without town approval at the annual or a special town meeting. The town does not have a mayor, but the board of selectmen does choose a chair who is responsible for running its meetings. The town manager is chosen by the select board, and is considered the chief executive officer for the town.

== Notable people ==
- Phineas Banning Blanchard, sea captain and maritime industry leader; resided and buried in Searsport
- Henry Chadwick, journalist
- Joanna Carver Colcord, writer, social work pioneer
- Lincoln Ross Colcord, author, journalist
- Roswell K. Colcord, 7th governor of Nevada; born in Searsport
- Peter A. Garland, US congressman, town manager of Searsport
- Sam Houston, bodyguard for George Washington
- Matthew Kenney, celebrity chef, raised in Searsport
- Freeman McGilvery, army officer
- Marlboro Packard, master shipbuilder
- Ephraim K. Smart, US congressman; born in Searsport
- Frederick Stevens, US representative from Minnesota; raised in Searsport

== Sites of interest ==
- Moose Point State Park
- Sears Island
- Union School
- Penobscot Marine Museum
- Cape Jellison
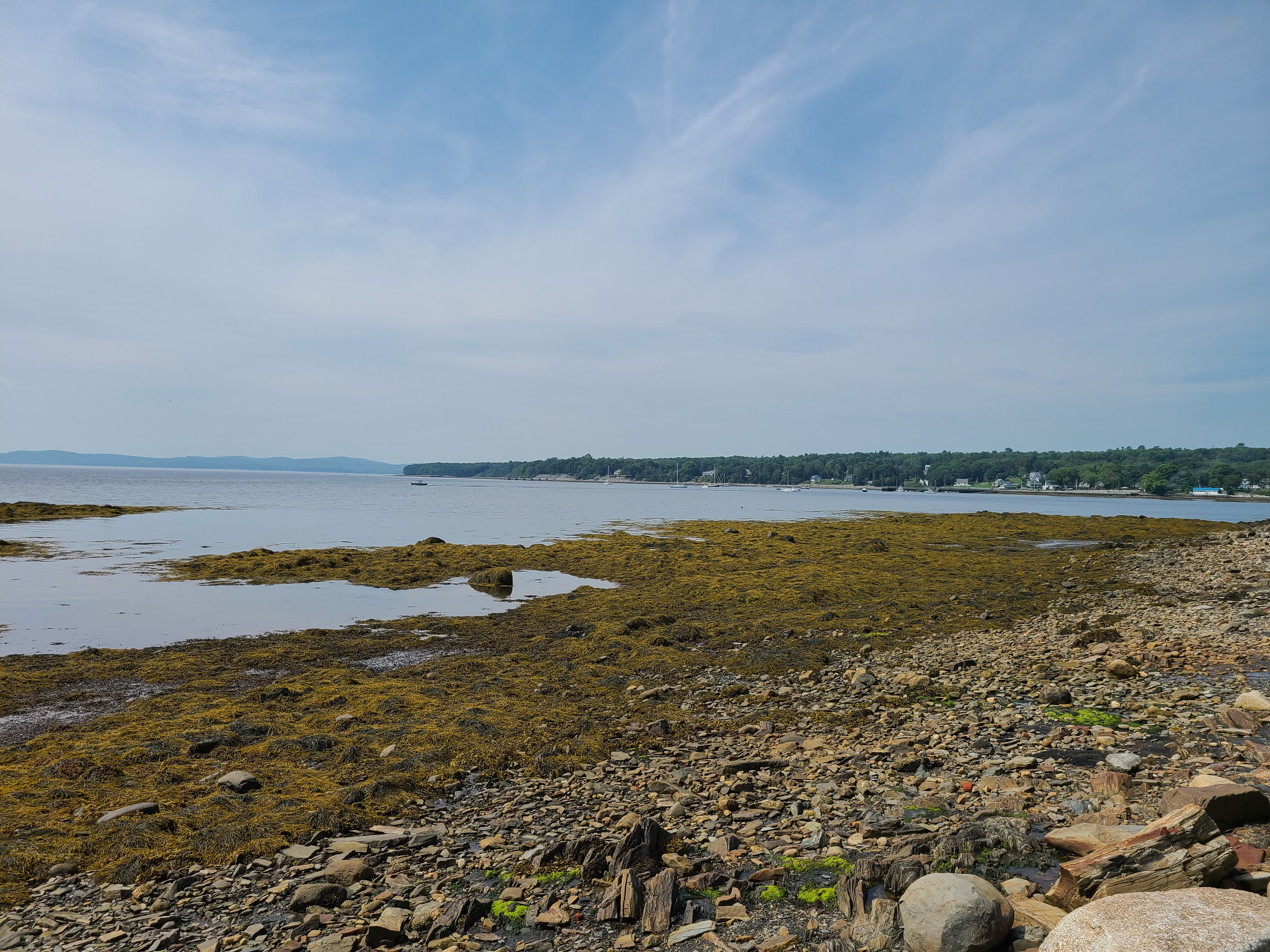
Searsport harbor in Maine

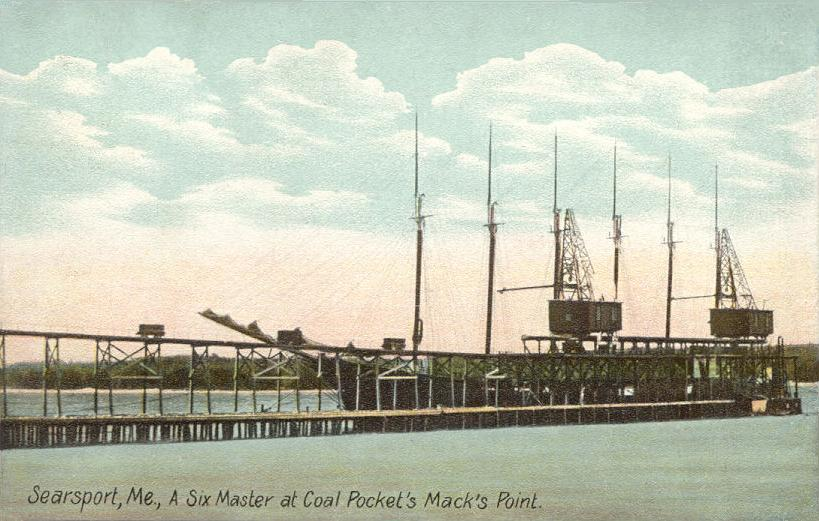
Six-masted schooner c. 1908

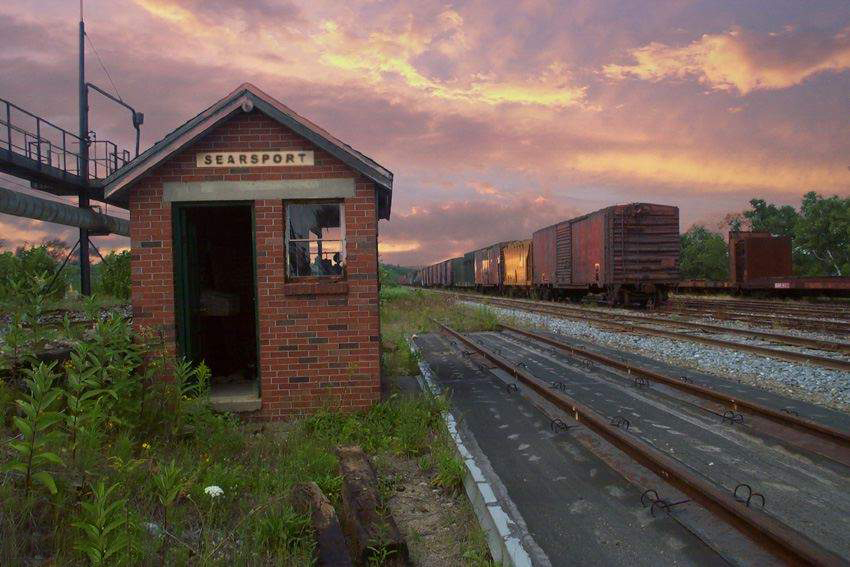
Mack Point cargo terminal rail yard

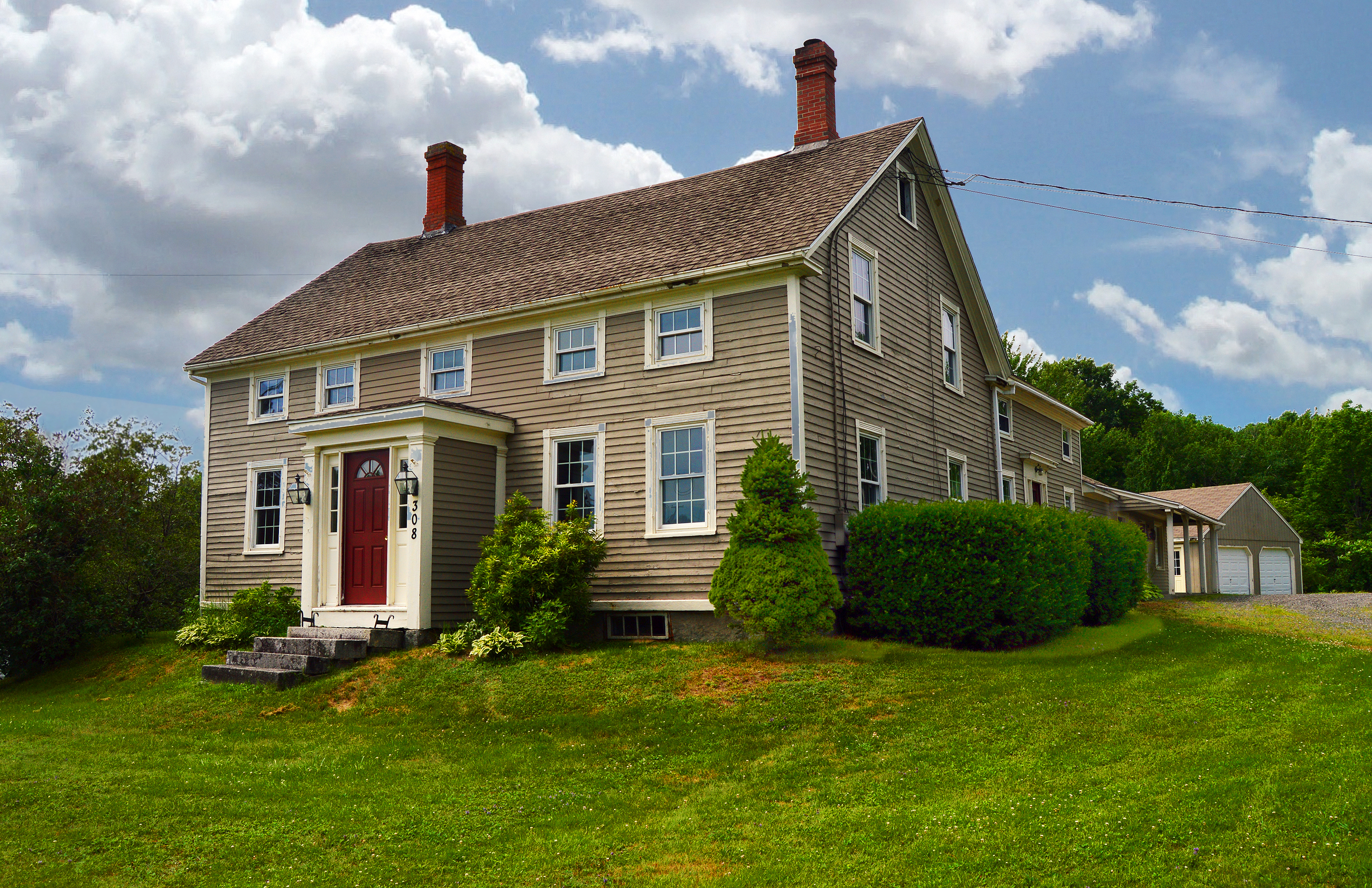
Typical 19th century Searsport sea captain's house (built 1840)
