= Whitneyville Congregational Church =

Whitneyville Congregational Church may refer to:

- Whitneyville Congregational Church (Hamden, Connecticut), listed on the National Register of Historic Places
- Whitneyville Congregational Church (Whitneyville, Maine), listed on the National Register of Historic Places in Washington County, Maine
