= Jonesboro Grange No. 357 =

- U.S. National Register of Historic Places
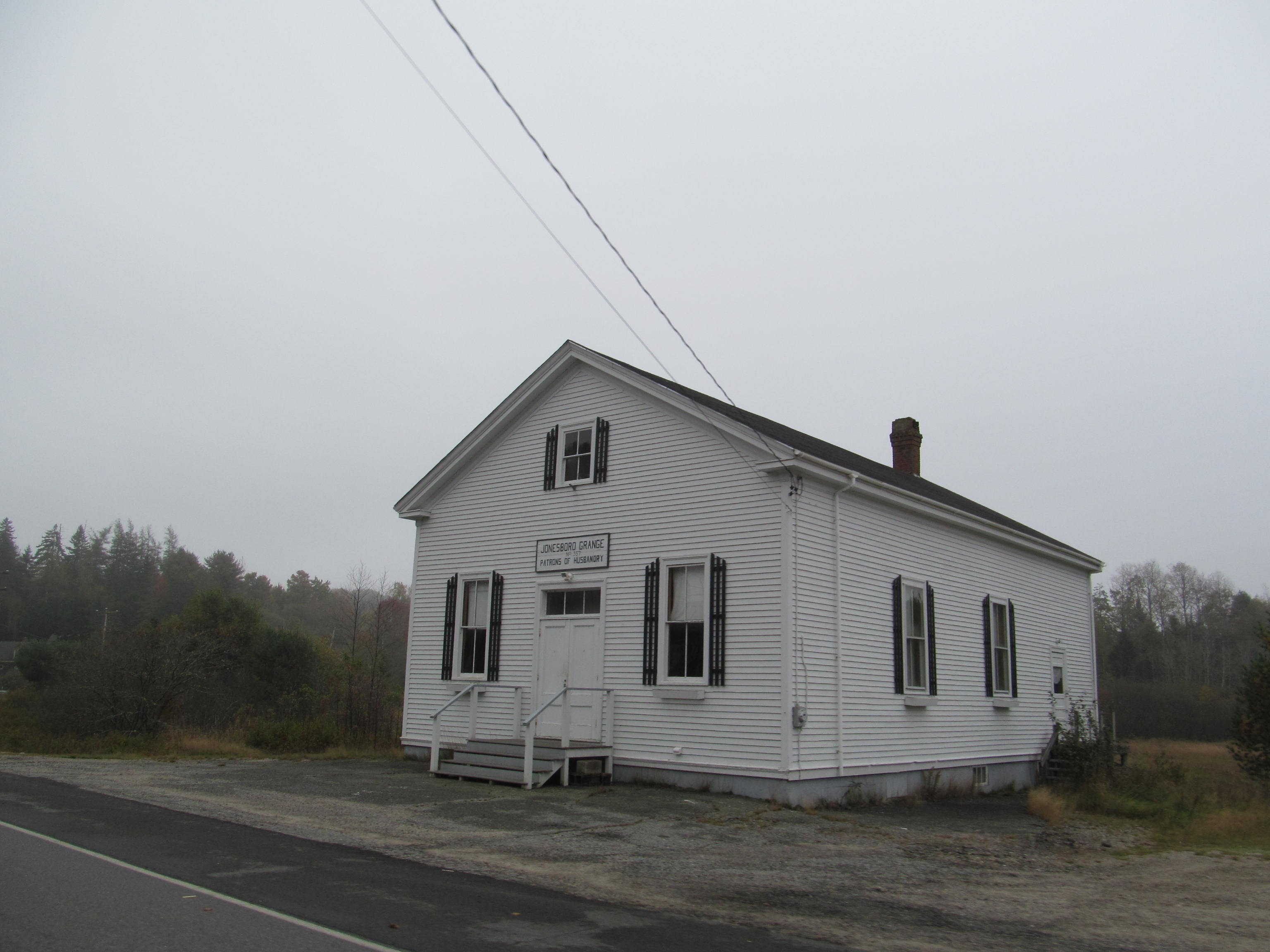

- Location within Maine Location within the United States
- Location: Harrington Rd. (US 1), Jonesboro, Maine
- Coordinates: 44°39′44″N 67°34′21″W
- Area: 0.22 acres (0.089 ha)
- Built: 1916
- NRHP reference No.: 10001035
- Added to NRHP: December 15, 2010

The Jonesboro Grange No. 357 is a historic Grange hall on Harrington Road (United States Route 1) in Jonesboro, Maine. Built between 1908 and 1916, it has served as the primary social and community event hall in the small rural community for more than 100 years. It was listed on the National Register of Historic Places in 2010.

== Description and history ==
The Jonesboro Grange is located in the town's dispersed rural village, on the south side of Harrington Road (US 1), the principal east-west artery in the region. It is a 1-1/2 story wood frame structure, with a front-facing gable roof, clapboard siding, and a poured concrete foundation. Its front facade is symmetrical, with a pair of sash windows flanking a double-leaf entrance that is topped by a three-light transom window. A small sash window is set in the gable above. The first-floor windows on the front and sides are flanked by three-board shutters, and have small flower boxes below the sill. The interior is divided into a foyer space and main hall, with stairs leading up to a balcony and down to the full basement in one corner of the foyer. The interior of the foyer and main hall are finished in vertical bead-board wainscoting, with plaster above in the foyer and painted tin on the main hall. The basement is partially finished, providing a kitchen and dining space as well as storage.

The Jonesboro Grange was organized in 1900, a period of significant growth of the organization in Maine, and originally met in the town office building. In 1904 planning began for the construction of a meeting hall. Land was purchased in 1907, construction of the exterior was completed in 1910, and the interior was finished in 1916. The building was originally located 18 feet (5.5 m) west of its present location, and was moved in 1956 to accommodate a widened Harrington Road. At that time a new foundation was poured, and the fixtures of the original basement were relocated to the new basement. The building was electrified in 1927.

The Jonesboro Grange has, since its inception, been an organizing force for community events, and its hall has been a social and community event space. The Grange organizes events on the Fourth of July and during the Christmas holiday period, and provides the only public kitchen in the rural community. In the late 1950s it also acted as a temporary school during renovations to the town's high school.

== See also ==
- National Register of Historic Places listings in Washington County, Maine
