= Union Evangelical Church =

Historic church in Maine, United States

- U.S. National Register of Historic Places
- Location within Maine Location within the United States
- Nearest city: Addison, Maine
- Coordinates: 44°36′59″N 67°45′20″W
- Area: less than one acre
- Built: 1860
- Architectural style: Greek Revival, Gothic Revival
- NRHP reference No.: 96000654
- Added to NRHP: June 07, 1996

The Union Evangelical Church is a historic church on Ridge Road in Addison, Maine. Built about 1860, it is a well-preserved example of a transitional Greek Revival-Gothic Revival church building. It was listed on the National Register of Historic Places in 1996.

== Description and history ==
The Union Evangelical Church is located west of Addison's village center, at the junction of Ridge Road with Church Hill Lane. It is set on a rise overlooking the Pleasant River, with views of the Maine coast. The building is a single-story wood frame structure, with a gabled roof, clapboard siding, and granite foundation. The roof is topped by a two-stage square tower, consisting of a low first stage, and a belfry stage with rectangular louvers in each wall, framed by projecting hoods and pilasters. A simple dentillated cornice caps that stage. The tower was apparently once topped by crenellations. The building corners have pilasters with lancet-arched panels, rising to a broad entablature extending across the front and sides. The front facade is symmetrical, with a pair of entrances on either side of a central pair of long and narrow windows. The window and doors are topped by Gothic drip molding, a detail carried to the windows on the sides.

The first church was built on this site in 1789, and was destroyed in a gale in 1839. The second church, built soon afterward, was destroyed by fire resulting from a lightning strike in 1860. The present church was built soon afterward; its designer and builder are not known, but the church is stylistically similar to another in nearby Columbia.

== See also ==
- National Register of Historic Places listings in Washington County, Maine
