= Central Congregational Church (Eastport, Maine) =

Historic church in Maine, United States

- U.S. National Register of Historic Places
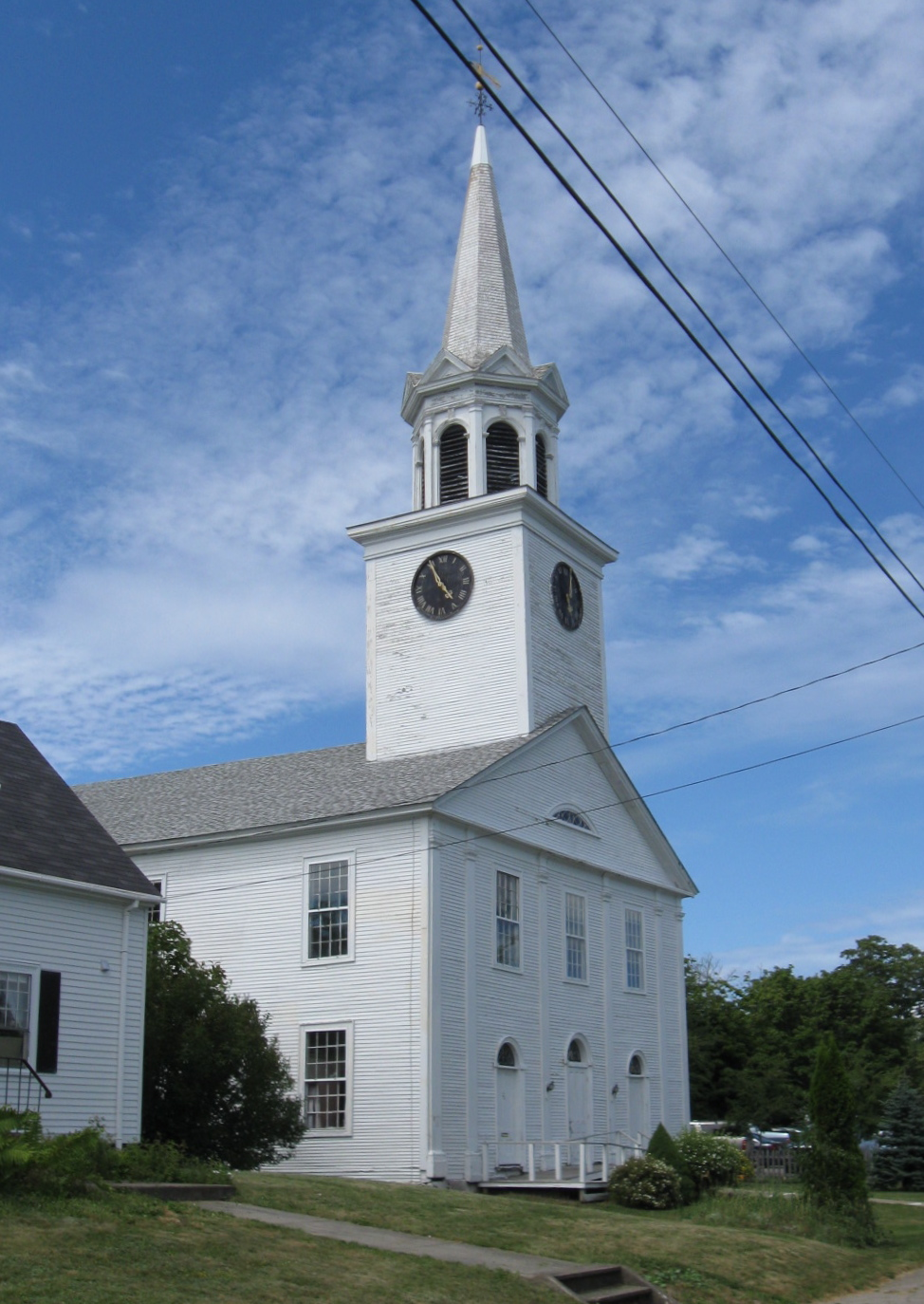

- Location within Maine Location within the United States
- Location: 26 Middle St., Eastport, Maine
- Coordinates: 44°54′14″N 66°59′16″W
- Area: 1 acre (0.40 ha)
- Built: 1829
- Architect: Low, Daniel
- Architectural style: Federal
- NRHP reference No.: 76000116
- Added to NRHP: June 23, 1976

The Central Congregational Church is a historic church at 26 Middle Street in Eastport, Maine, USA. The meeting house was built in 1829, and is a remarkably sophisticated example of Federal style architecture for what was then a frontier community. It was listed on the National Register of Historic Places in 1976.

== Description and history ==
The Central Congregational Church of Eastport is set on the west side of Middle Street, midway between Boyton and Key Streets. It is a gable-roofed wood frame structure, with clapboard siding and a stone foundation. Its main facade, facing east is symmetrically organized, with three bays of entrances demarcated by pilasters rising through the gallery level to a cornice, above which is the pedimented gable with an eyebrow window at its center. A square tower is set just back from the front, with a tall first stage that has a clock near the top, with an octagonal belfry as the second stage. The belfry has louvered openings framed by keystoned arches set on impost blocks, with small gables above, surrounding the base of an octagonal steeple.

The interior is largely unaltered, and of high quality. A gallery lines three sides of the interior, with the fourth highlighted by an arch with elaborate drapery moulding. The pulpit stands before the arch, and the ground floor is otherwise lined with bench pews.

The Congregational Church was built in 1828 and dedicated in February, 1829 for a congregation established in 1819. It was Eastport's second congregation, the first following Unitarianism, while this group followed a more traditional Trinitarian theology. The church was apparently designed and building supervised by Daniel Low, a member of the building committee about whom nothing is known. The building's only major alteration is the reconstruction of its steeple after the original was blown off in 1869; the clock was added at the time. The building is now owned by the Tides Institute & Museum of Art of Eastport, Maine and is being repurposed as an historic space. The small congregation continues to meet at the church building on Sunday mornings during the summer months.

== See also ==
- National Register of Historic Places listings in Washington County, Maine
