= Sewall Memorial Congregational Church =

Historic church in Maine, United States

- U.S. National Register of Historic Places
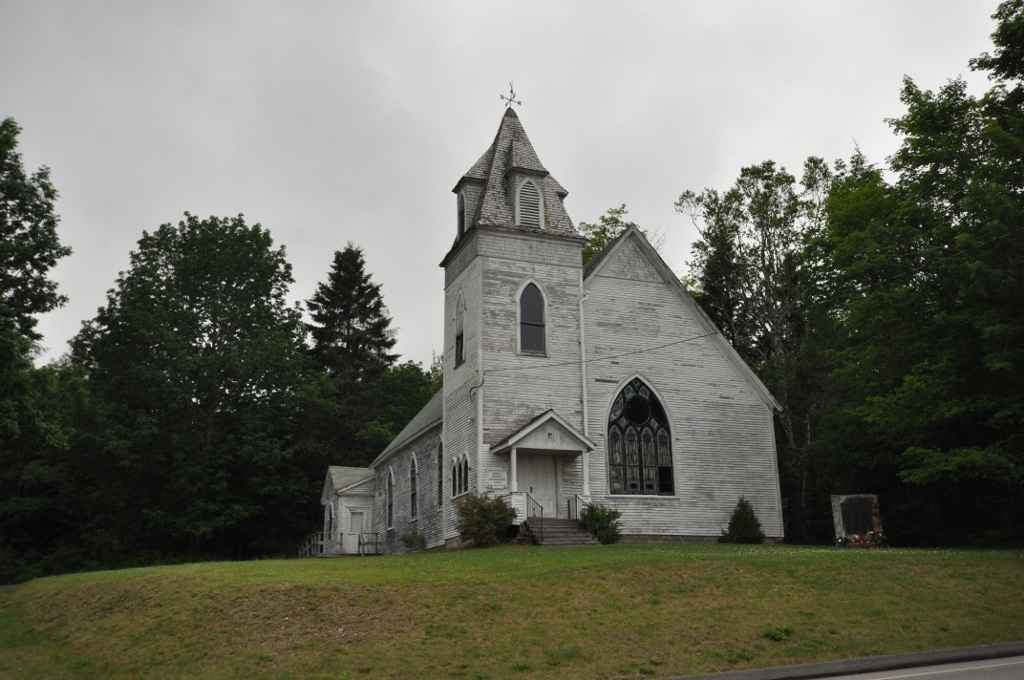

- Location within Maine Location within the United States
- Location: 558 U.S. Route 1, Robbinston, Maine
- Coordinates: 45°5′4″N 67°6′42″W
- Area: less than one acre
- Built: 1911
- Architectural style: Late Victorian
- NRHP reference No.: 12001070
- Added to NRHP: December 19, 2012

The Sewall Memorial Congregational Church is a historic church at 558 United States Route 1 in Robbinston, Maine. Built in 1911, it is the small community's only example of a Late Victorian church, with an asymmetrical Queen Anne style. The church, whose congregation dates to the early 19th century, was listed on the National Register of Historic Places in 2012 (misspelled "Sewell"). It is affiliated with the United Church of Christ.

== Description and history ==
The Sewall Memorial Church is located on the west side of US 1, directly opposite the Redclyffe Motel, and overlooking the St. Croix River. It is a tall single-story wood-frame structure, finished mainly in clapboards, with a few bands of decorative cut wood shingles. It rests on a concrete block and stone foundation with a granite cornerstone dated 1809–10. It has a front-facing gabled roof, with a square tower projecting slight from the left front corner. The main entrance is in the base of the tower, sheltered by a gabled porch, with lancet-arched windows at the second stage, and pyramidal roof at the top that has hip-roofed dormers housing arched louvers. The main facade has a large lancet-arched stained-glass window, and the sides have evenly spaced smaller arched stained-glass windows. A single-story vestry extends to the rear of the building.

The Robbinston Congregational Church was established in 1811, and built its first meeting house on this site in 1841. In July 1910 the building was struck by lightning and burned down, although historic artifacts were preserved. The present church was built soon afterward, with significant funding assistance from the children of Rev. David Sewall, who had been pastor here 1842–59. The church was consequently renamed in that family's honor. The church congregation was moribund for about twenty years beginning in the 1970s, but was revived in the 1990s and the building restored. The building, whose architect is not known, is one of eighteen historic (pre-1930) churches statewide that has the asymmetrical side-tower plan.

== See also ==
- National Register of Historic Places listings in Washington County, Maine
