= East Machias Historic District =

Historic district in Maine, United States

- U.S. National Register of Historic Places
- U.S. Historic district
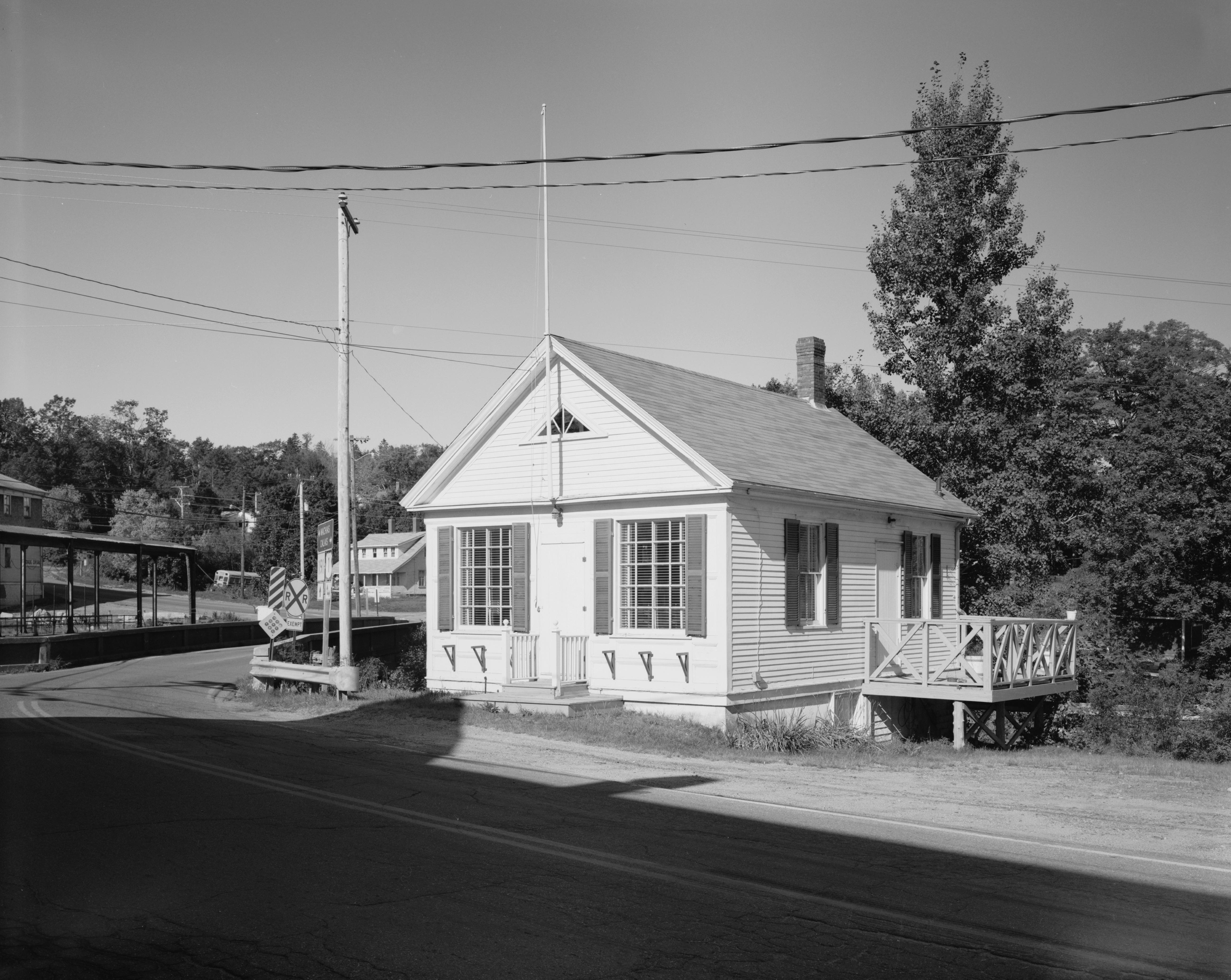
- The East Machias Post Office, undated HABS photo

- Location within Maine Location within the United States
- Location: High, Water, and Bridge Sts., East Machias, Maine
- Coordinates: 44°44′11″N 67°23′21″W
- Area: 63 acres (25 ha)
- Built: 1785
- NRHP reference No.: 73000153
- Added to NRHP: April 11, 1973

The East Machias Historic District encompasses the historic early center of the 19th century lumber and shipbuilding center of East Machias, Maine. The district includes houses built between about 1760 and 1880, several churches, and Washington Academy, a private school founded in 1792. The district was listed on the National Register of Historic Places in 1973.

== Description and history ==
The area that is now East Machias was first settled in the 1760s, and was part of neighboring Machias until 1826. Its principal settlement grew near a falls on the East Machias River, where several mills were established. Washington Academy, founded in 1792, was given a permanent home in East Machias in 1823. The area was an economically successful shipbuilding and lumbering area for most of the 19th century, giving rise to the collection of historic properties on the east bank of the river.

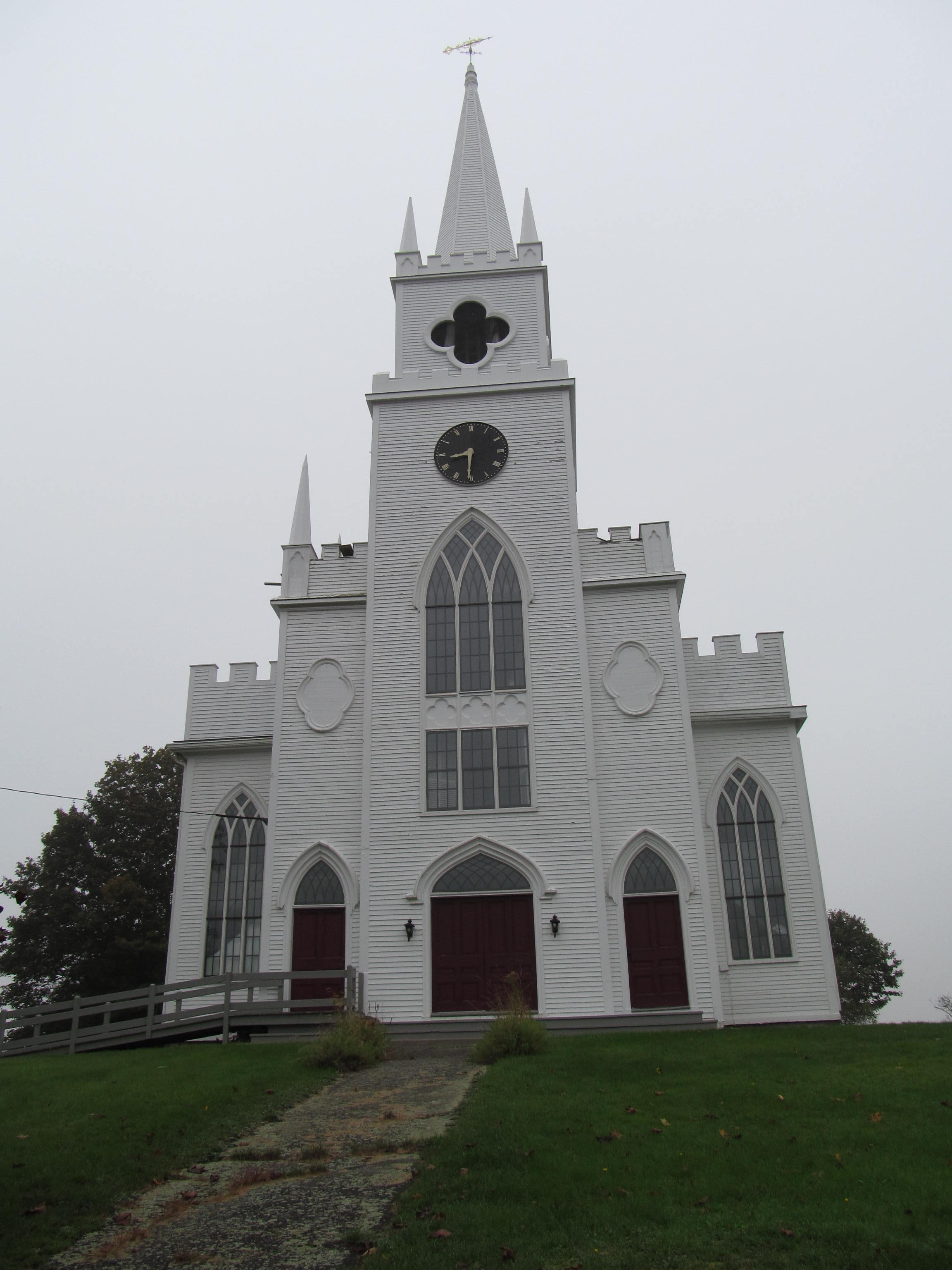
The First Congregational Church

The district extends along the eastern bank of the East Machias River, roughly between the bridge carrying United States Route 1 in the north and that carrying Willow Street to the south. It extends inland to include properties on Water Street and Cutler Road (Maine State Route 191). Most of the buildings in the 63-acre (25 ha) district are residential, 1-1/2 to 2-1/2 stories in height, and of wood frame construction with clapboard siding. Notable exceptions including the original Washington Academy building (1823), the First Congregational Church (1836), and the former Church of the Disciples of Christ (1880), now an academy building. There are also two mid-19th century commercial buildings, a schoolhouse from that period, and the archaeological remains of four separate mills.

== See also ==
- National Register of Historic Places listings in Washington County, Maine
