= Henry D. Moore Parish House and Library =

- U.S. National Register of Historic Places
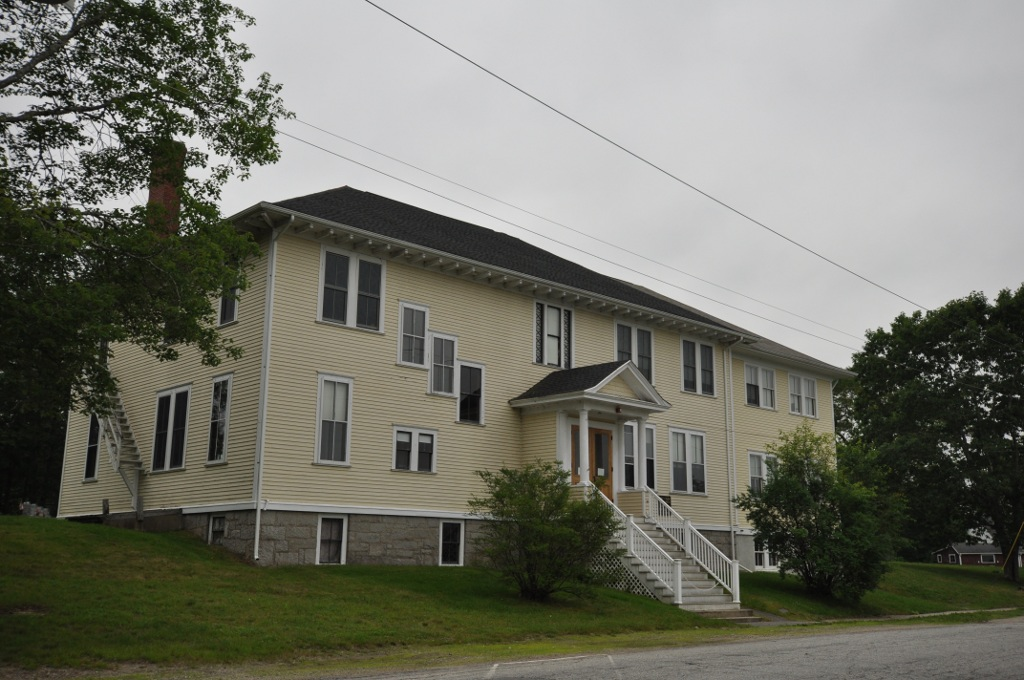

- Location within Maine Location within the United States
- Location: 22 Village Rd., Steuben, Maine
- Coordinates: 44°30′39″N 67°57′43″W
- Area: less than one acre
- Built: 1911
- Architect: Isaac Parsell
- Architectural style: Late 19th And 20th Century Revivals
- NRHP reference No.: 01001272
- Added to NRHP: November 29, 2001

The Henry D. Moore Parish House and Library is an historic library and community meeting hall at 22 Village Road in Steuben, Maine. Built in 1911 and enlarged in 2007, it is a notable local example of a mix of Colonial Revival and Craftsman styles, and is the only known work in Maine of Philadelphia architect Isaac Parsell. The building was listed on the National Register of Historic Places in 2001.

== Description and history ==
The Moore Parish House and Library is located in Steuben's village center, on the south side of Village Road, between the town's triangular green and United States Route 1. It is a two-story wood frame structure, with a hip roof, clapboarded exterior, and a foundation that is part stone and part poured concrete. It consists of an original portion, roughly five bays wide, that was built in 1911, and a two-bay extension added to the right in 2007. The roof of the original portion has deep overhanging eaves with exposed rafter ends in the Craftsman style, and a complex pattern of window layout. A gabled entry projects near the center of this section, with a porch supported by round columns sheltering an entry with flanking sidelight windows. To the left of the entrance are a row of stepped fixed-pane windows, marking the presence of a staircase. The interior includes an auditorium with stage, smaller meeting spaces, and two rooms used by the local historical society, in addition to the library facilities.

The original portion of the building was completed in July 1911, and publicly dedicated a month later. The building was a gift to the town of native son Henry Dyer Moore, a businessman active in New York and New Jersey. It has served the town since then as its public library, and as a community meeting space. The building was enlarged in 2007 to provide additional meeting spaces and code-compliant access facilities; the architect was Sam Woodward.

== See also ==
- National Register of Historic Places listings in Washington County, Maine
