= Jonesboro Union Church =

Historic church in Maine, United States

- U.S. National Register of Historic Places
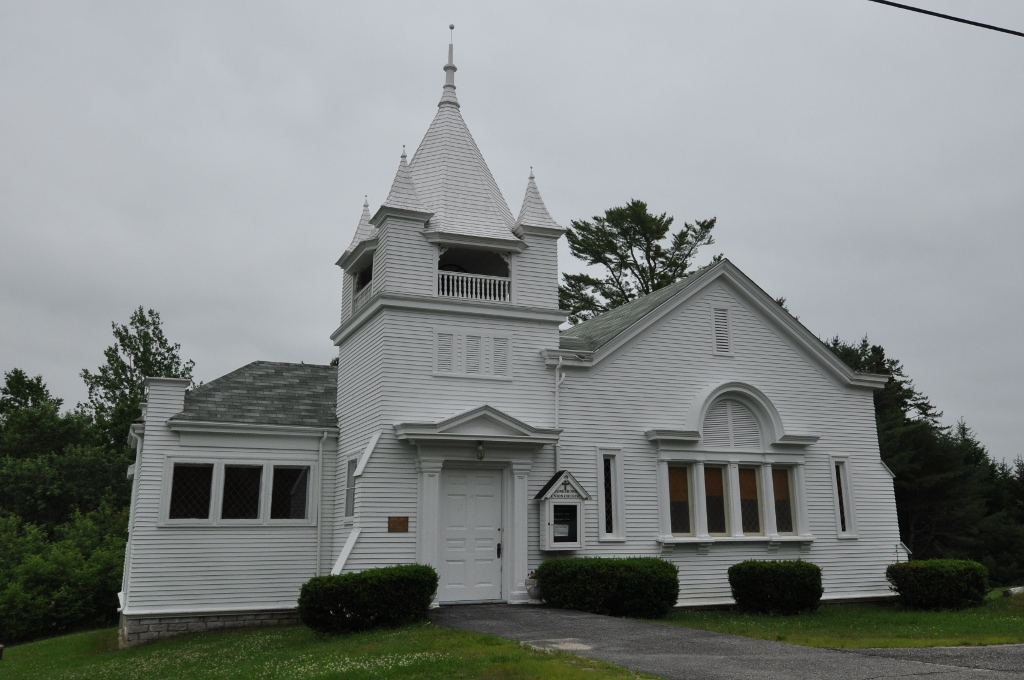

- Location within Maine Location within the United States
- Location: Looks Point Rd., at jct. with US 1, Jonesboro, Maine
- Coordinates: 44°39′35″N 67°34′32″W
- Area: less than one acre
- Built: 1840; 1911
- Built by: Calvin Whitney (1911)
- Architect: E. Leander Higgins (1911)
- Architectural style: Late Gothic Revival, Tudor Revival
- NRHP reference No.: 02000788
- Added to NRHP: July 18, 2002

Jonesboro Union Church is a historic church on Looks Point Road, at the junction with U.S. Route 1 in Jonesboro, Maine. Built in 1841 and significantly restyled in 1911, it is the community's only surviving 19th-century church. It is also notable for its eclectic blend of architectural styles, and is an important early ecclesiastical work of Portland architect Edward Leander Higgins. It was listed on the National Register of Historic Places in 2002.

== Description and history ==
The Jonesboro Union Church is located in the dispersed rural village center of Jonesboro, just east of US 1 on the north side of Looks Point Road, overlooking the Chandler River. The church is a 1-1/2 wood frame structure, with complex massing and roofline. It is finished in wooden clapboards, and rests on a foundation of stone and concrete blocks. The building is very roughly T-shaped, with a two-story tower at the T's southern inside corner. To the right of the tower is a north-south gable-roof section, whose front is flush with that of the tower. Behind the tower a hip-roof section extends to the west. The tower houses the main entrance vestibule, the rightmost section, which is the original 1841 church, houses the sanctuary, and the back section houses the vestry area. The sanctuary, originally oriented with the pulpit at the long end in the traditional 19th-century manner, is now oriented with the pulpit area in a projecting section on the east side. The building exhibits Gothic Revival elements, with buttresses flanking the sides of the front, flared-roof pinnacles and steeple on the tower, and a modest amount of jigsawn woodwork in the open bays of the tower.

The town of Jonesboro had three congregations in 1840, for whom this church was built as a union meeting house in 1841. By the turn of the 20th century two of the congregations were no longer active, and the building was in need of extensive repairs. Portland architect E. Leander Higgins was retained to design changes to what had been a traditional Greek Revival structure, in order to accommodate a large sanctuary. The building was moved 20 feet (6.1 m) onto a new foundation, its interior reoriented from horizontal to longitudinal, and the tower and vestry added.

The church alterations are one of the earliest known ecclesiastical works of Higgins, who had up to that time worked principally on residential architecture. In the 1920s and 1930s he was one of Portland's leading architects, with an acknowledged expertise in Gothic Revival architecture that included commissions from the Episcopal Diocese of Maine.

== See also ==
- National Register of Historic Places listings in Washington County, Maine
