= Charlotte Pound =

Historic animal pound in Maine, US

- U.S. National Register of Historic Places
- Location within Maine Location within the United States
- Location: Charlotte Rd., 0.25 mi E of jct. with ME 214, Charlotte, Maine
- Coordinates: 45°0′25″N 67°16′16″W
- Area: 0.2 acres (0.081 ha)
- Built: 1872
- NRHP reference No.: 05001442
- Added to NRHP: December 21, 2005

The Charlotte Pound is a historic animal pound on Charlotte Road in Charlotte, Maine. Built in 1872 out of logs on a stone foundation, it is the only documented wooden pound in the state. It was listed on the National Register of Historic Places in 2005.

== Description and history ==
The Charlotte Pound is located on the north side of Charlotte Road, about 0.25 miles (0.40 km) east of its junction with Maine State Route 214. It is an octagonal structure, each side measuring about 18 feet (5.5 m). It has a cobbled stone foundation, and is constructed out of stacked cedar logs, the ends at each joint overhanging by about 1 foot (0.30 m), with half-round notches as joinery. Metal rods have been driven through each joint. Seven of the sides are seven logs in height, while the side facing south-southeast has eight. That side also has the entrance to the structure, in which the center six logs have been fastened via tenons to vertical posts, and a wooden gate mounted in the opening. The upper and lower logs of this side run over and under the gate.

The town of Charlotte was incorporated in 1825, but the early settlers of the area had in 1822 already funded maintenance of a pound on one farmer's property. A formal wooden structure was authorized in 1826, and this structure (not at the site of either of the two previous structures) was authorized in 1872. The office of pound keeper was maintained by the town into the 1920s, after which the structure was abandoned. In 1988 interest in the now-deteriorated structure was revived, and it underwent a restoration in which about 40% of its logs were replaced. It is the only known wooden pound in the state; the other that are documented are all stone construction.

== See also ==
- National Register of Historic Places listings in Washington County, Maine
