= Atkinson-Koskinen Site =

- Atkinson-Koskinen Site 45.13
- U.S. National Register of Historic Places
- Nearest city: Steuben, Maine
- Area: 1 acre (0.40 ha)
- NRHP reference No.: 84000282
- Added to NRHP: November 23, 1984

The Atkinson-Koskinen Site, designated 45.13 by the Maine Archaeological Survey, is a prehistoric archaeological site in or near Steuben, Maine. Its main feature is a non-shell refuse midden, a rarity on the coast of eastern Maine. Along with the Goddard Site in Brooklin, it is important in analyzing land use and subsistence patterns during the Late Ceramic period (1000-1400 CE). The site was listed on the National Register of Historic Places in 1984.

== Description ==
The Atkinson-Koskinen Site is the eroding remnant of a seasonal prehistoric Native American campsite, occupying a point on the coast of Maine. Part of the surrounding terrain includes a cranberry bog, which investigating archaeologists believe may also contain cultural remains. The portions of the site that have been evaluated contain cultural artifacts in about 25 centimetres (9.8 in) of topsoil, most of it in a dark soil layer beneath a top layer of about 15 centimetres (5.9 in). Typical finds include fire-cracked rocks, bone and bone fragments, flaked stone, and shells. Shells are not a regular feature of the site, since a number of test pits contained no or very little shell material.

This type of non-shell midden area is rare on the coast of Maine. At the time of its listing on the National Register in 1984, only one other site, the major Goddard Site, was known. This site has thus been deemed important as a test of the uniqueness of the Goddard Site as a seasonal encampment area, or whether there were characteristics of the social and economic environment of the Native Americans of the Late Ceramic period in Maine that might have made such sites more common.

== See also ==
- National Register of Historic Places listings in Washington County, Maine
