= Dennysville Historic District =

Historic district in Maine, United States

- U.S. National Register of Historic Places
- U.S. Historic district
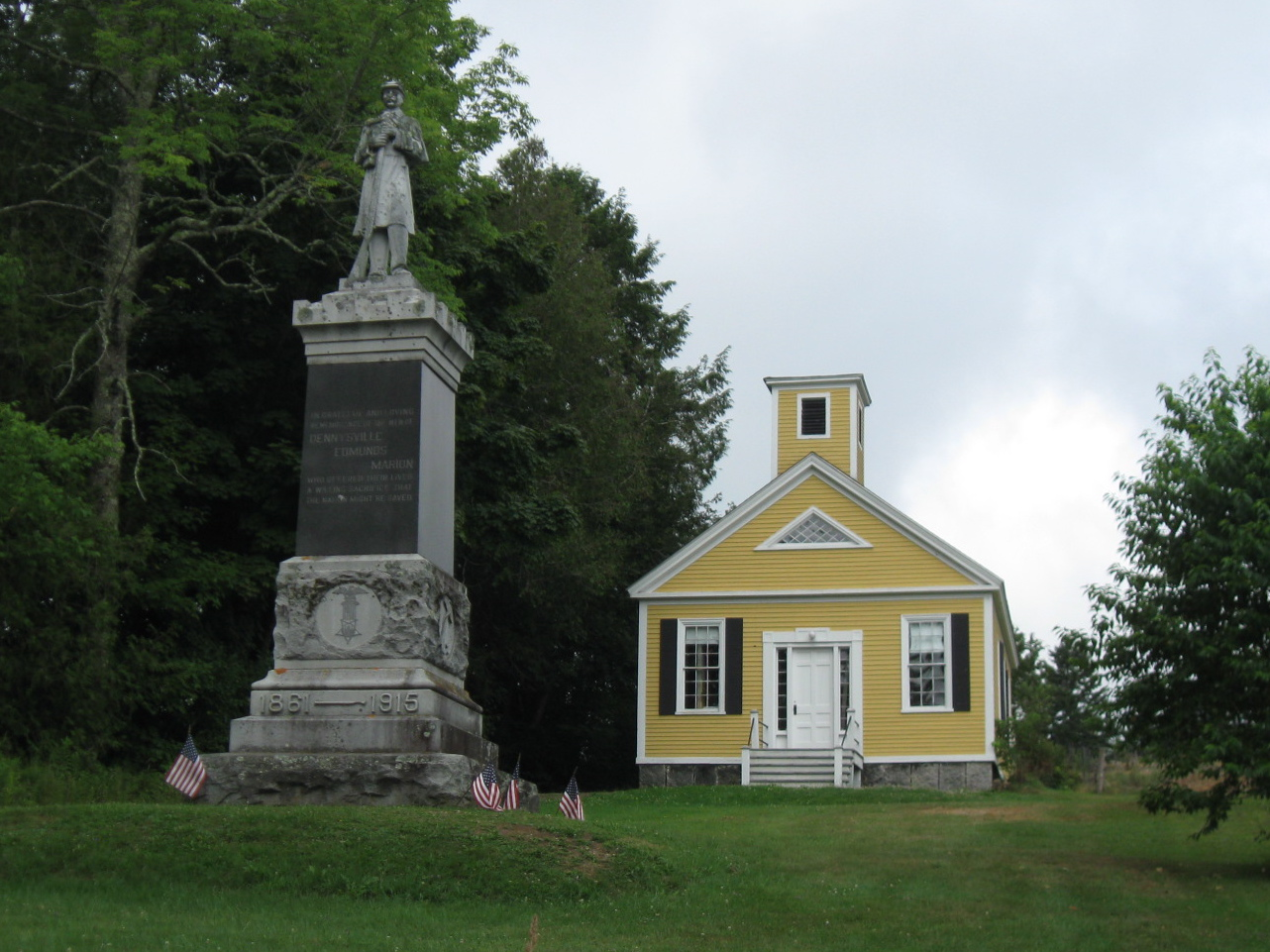
- The Dennysville Academy building

- Location within Maine Location within the United States
- Location: The Lane, Main and King Sts., Dennysville, Maine
- Coordinates: 44°54′1″N 67°13′45″W
- Area: 30 acres (12 ha)
- Architectural style: Colonial Revival, Federal
- NRHP reference No.: 82000427
- Added to NRHP: October 29, 1982

The Dennysville Historic District encompasses the historic town center of Dennysville, Maine. Located near the southern end of the large rural community, its architecture covers more than 100 years of community history, from the early 19th to early 20th centuries. The district extends along Main Street between Maine State Route 86 and Bunker Hill Road, on the west bank of the Dennys River. It was listed on the National Register of Historic Places in 1982.

== Description and history ==
The town of Dennysville was established in 1786 by General Benjamin Lincoln, a veteran of the American Revolutionary War, and its settlement was overseen by his son Theodore. The town center grew on the banks of the Dennys River, which provided the power to bring the area's timber to mills and market. The town was economically successful in the lumber industry until virgin timber in the region was exhausted, and the main lumber mill in town burned in the 1930s.

The town center is a largely linear area, lining the west side of Main Street, which parallels the river south of State Route 86 (King Street). It extends south just beyond the Bunker Hill Road bridge across the river, and along The Lane and Mahar's Lane west to their junction. This area includes 22 historically significant properties on about 30 acres (12 ha) of land. Most prominent among these properties are the civic buildings and the church, an 1834 Federal-Greek Revival structure built in 1834, which retains its original box pews. The town library, built in 1923, is one of the newest buildings in the district, a distinctive Bungalow-style structure with a stuccoed brick exterior. The Dennysville Academy building is a fine Greek Revival structure built in 1846 and used in later years as a church vestry. Other non-residential buildings include the American Legion Hall (c. 1885), formerly a Masonic lodge, and Allan's Stage and Livery Stable, a horse barn dating to about 1875.

Most of the houses in the district were built before 1850, and are either Federal or Greek Revival in style. They are typically 1-1/2 to 2-1/2 stories in height, of wood frame construction, and finished with wooden clapboards. One house, built about 1860, is notable for its Italianate style. One Federal style house, that of Captain Ebenezer Wilder, was built in 1834, but has later Queen Anne/Eastlake styling applied. There are two mid-20th century houses that are not historically significant. The map that accompanies the nomination form was done prior to a shift of Route 86 (Main Street). The Church and Library are closer to Route 86 than they were to the old alignment of Main Street. The Lane, therefore, descends from the present Route 86. A few of the houses at the eastern end of Main Street are not easily visible due to tree growth.

== See also ==
- National Register of Historic Places listings in Washington County, Maine
