= Union Meeting House (Whiting, Maine) =

Historic church in Maine, United States

- U.S. National Register of Historic Places
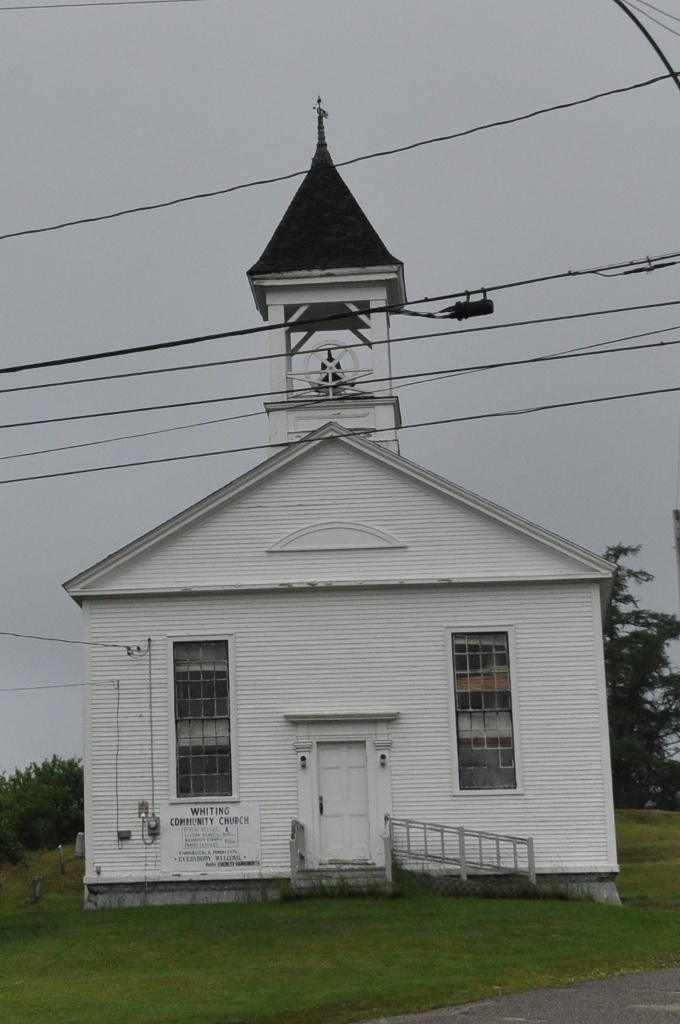

- Location within Maine Location within the United States
- Nearest city: 153 US 1, Whiting, Maine
- Coordinates: 44°47′27″N 67°10′32″W
- Area: less than one acre
- Built: 1836
- Architectural style: Federal, Greek Revival
- NRHP reference No.: 14000139
- Added to NRHP: April 11, 2014

The Union Meeting House, also known as the Whiting Community Church, is a historic church building at 153 United States Route 1 in Whiting, Maine. Built in 1836, it is a distinctive local example of transitional Federal-Greek Revival architecture. It was listed on the National Register of Historic Places in 2014.

== Description and history ==
The Union Meeting House stands in the center of the rural village of Whiting, on the north side of the three-way junction of US 1 and Maine State Route 189. It is a single story wood frame structure, with a gabled roof, clapboard siding, and a foundation of ornamental concrete blocks. The roof is topped by an open belfry with a pyramidal roof that has a spire that is a sculpted metal fish. The main facade is three bays wide, with a center entrance flanked by sash windows, and a fully pedimented gable above, in which there is an arched panel at the center. The entrance is framed by pilasters and topped by an entablature and cornice. The interior of the building has a vestibule area, from which narrow stairs wind to the gallery on one side, and a center double door leads into the sanctuary. The sanctuary has a coved ceiling finished in pressed tin, which extends down the walls to wainscoting. The floors are wide pine, and there are three banks of bench pews.

The church was built in 1836 by a union committee of two different Christian congregations, and has a basic Federal-period form, with a few added Greek Revival details, such as the fully pedimented gable. Churches of this period are rare in eastern Maine, and this one is a particularly well preserved instance. It underwent an interior remodeling in 1886, and again in 1904, when it is likely that the belfry and pressed tin finishes were added. A heating system was added in the 1960s, altering the configuration of the vestibule, but these changes have been reversed. Due to declining attendance of the congregations, the union committee deeded the building to the town in 2012.

== See also ==
- National Register of Historic Places listings in Washington County, Maine
