= Boynton Street Historic District =

Historic district in Maine, United States

- U.S. National Register of Historic Places
- U.S. Historic district
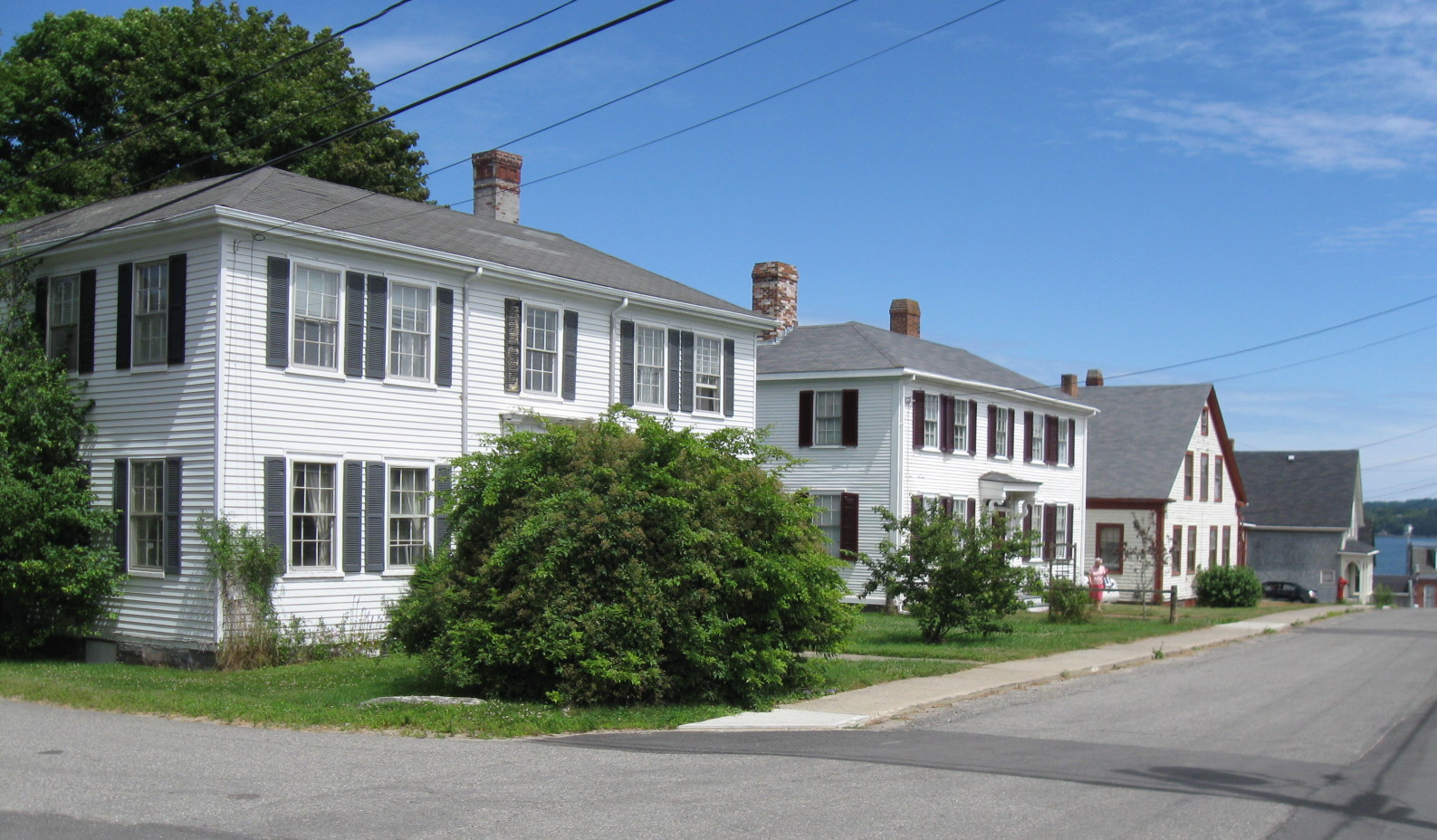

- Location within Maine Location within the United States
- Location: 13-26 Boynton St., Eastport, Maine
- Coordinates: 44°54′18″N 66°59′13″W
- Area: 2 acres (0.81 ha)
- Built: 1810
- Architectural style: Federal
- NRHP reference No.: 84001542
- Added to NRHP: July 19, 1984

The Boynton Street Historic District encompasses three historic Federal-period houses between 13 and 26 Boynton Street in Eastport, Maine. Built between 1810 and 1920, these well-preserved buildings represent the finest concentration of their type in easternmost Maine. They were listed on the National Register of Historic Places in 1984.

== Description and history ==
The three Boynton Street houses are located on the east side of Eastport, just off Water Street, its traditional principal business street. Two are on the north side of the street just east of Kilby Street, and the third is on the south side to its west. All three houses are wood frame structures two stories in height, with hip roofs, interior chimneys, and wood clapboard siding. They each have facades that are five bays wide, with a center entrance, and have interiors that retain a high degree of original Federal period woodwork.

The Jonathan Weston House is the oldest of the three, built in 1810 by a prominent local lawyer. It is distinguished from the others by its entrance, which is topped by a round-arch fanlight and is framed by narrow pilasters and an entablature. This house was where John James Audubon stayed before is trip to Labrador. The Kilby House was built in 1820 by Daniel Kilby, a ship owner. It has a larger round-arch transom over the entrance, with fluted pilasters and a full entablature. The third house was built by Gideon Stetson for Ebenezer Starboard, and was completed in 1823. Its entry has a fanlight transom, and is sheltered by an Italianate hood that is a later 19th-century modification.

== See also ==
- National Register of Historic Places listings in Washington County, Maine
