= Daniel Young House =

Historic house in Maine, United States

- U.S. National Register of Historic Places
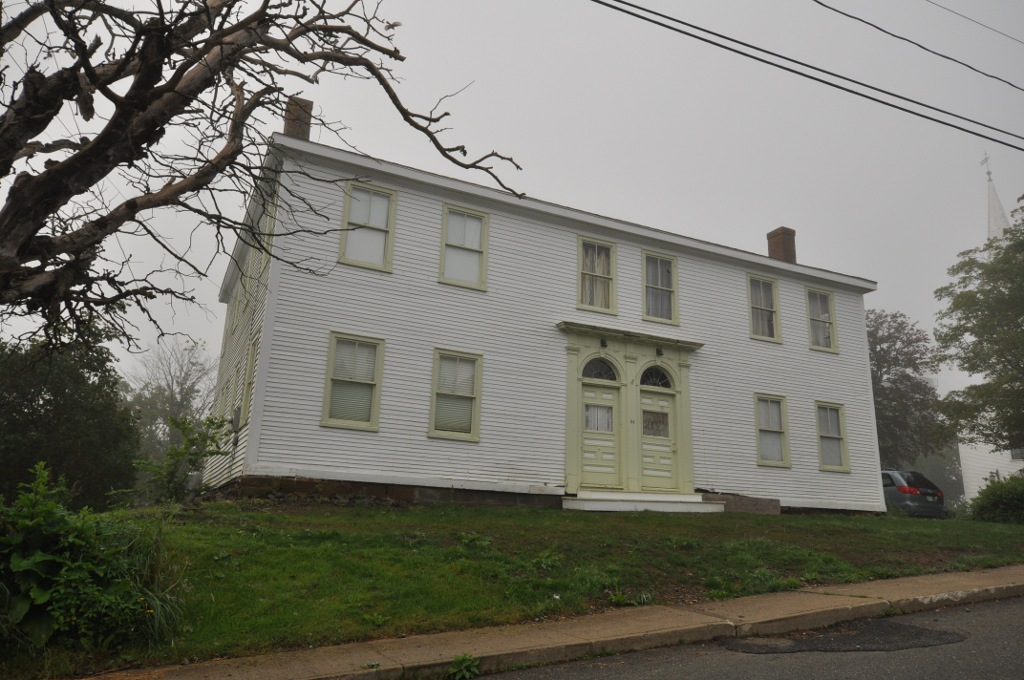

- Location within Maine Location within the United States
- Location: 34 Main St., Lubec, Maine
- Coordinates: 44°51′39″N 66°59′15″W
- Area: 0.5 acres (0.20 ha)
- Built: 1822
- Architectural style: Federal
- NRHP reference No.: 84001547
- Added to NRHP: March 22, 1984

The Daniel Young House is a historic house at 34 Main Street in Lubec, Maine. Built in 1822 for a local businessman, it is a regionally rare example of a Federal period double house, and one of the only ones known in the state that is built of wood. It was listed on the National Register of Historic Places in 1984.

== Description and history ==
The Daniel Young House is located in Lubec's main village, on the south side of Main Street just east of the Congregational Church. It is a two-story wood-frame structure, with a hip roof and clapboard siding. Its street-facing front facade is six bays wide, arranged symmetrically with a pair of doorways flanked by sash windows. The doorways are set under a shared cornice, with pilasters at the outside and between them, and each topped by a half-round transom. The panel doors, with windows in the upper half, are a c. 1900 alteration, as are the corbelled brick chimneys and the two-over-one sash windows. A single-story ell extends to the rear.

The house was built in 1822 for Daniel Young, a local businessman who occupied the right unit. The house has been a two-family for most of its history, although it spent some time in the 20th century divided into four units. It is the only known example of this form in eastern Maine, and is comparable in the state with brick examples in Portland.

== See also ==
- National Register of Historic Places listings in Washington County, Maine
