= Clark Perry House =

Historic house in Maine, United States

- U.S. National Register of Historic Places
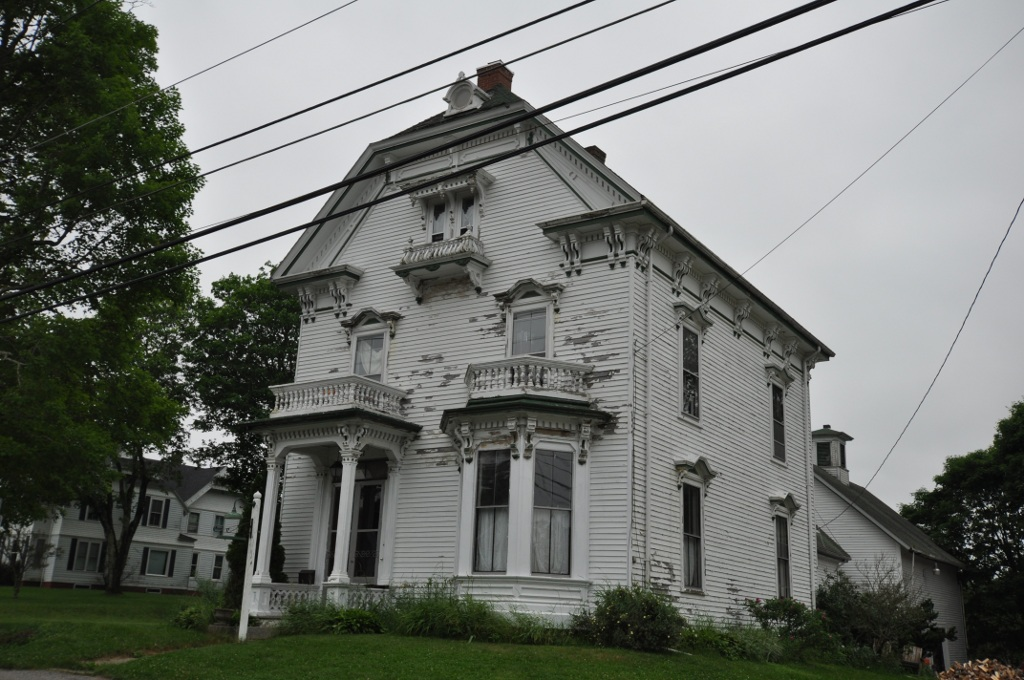

- Location within Maine Location within the United States
- Location: Court St., Machias, Maine
- Coordinates: 44°42′55″N 67°27′40″W
- Area: 0.5 acres (0.20 ha)
- Built: 1868
- Built by: Haskell Preble
- Architectural style: Italianate
- NRHP reference No.: 79000169
- Added to NRHP: October 9, 1979

The Clark Perry House is a historic house on Court Street in Machias, Maine. Built in 1868, it is one of Washington County's most elaborate examples of Italianate architecture. It was listed on the National Register of Historic Places in 1979.

== Description and history ==
The Clark Perry House is located in the village of Machias, a short way west of the main downtown area, on the north side of Court Street (United States Route 1A), between Broadway and Cooper Street. It is a typical New England connected house, with a main block that has ells connecting it to a carriage barn at the rear. It is a wood-frame structure, 2 1/2 stories in height, with a clipped-gable roof, clapboard siding, and granite foundation. The main facade faces south, and is two bays wide, with a single-story polygonal window bay on the right, and the main entrance on the left. Both the entry porch and window bay are topped by turned balustrades, and have bracketed and dentillated cornices, details that are repeated on the main roof line. The porch is supported by panelled posts mounted in wooden piers. Windows on the front and sides are capped by decorated bracketed hoods with mini-gables.

Clark Perry, a Machias native who owned a local general store, had this house built in 1868 by Haskell Preble, who may have also played a role in its design. It was described at the time its construction by the Machias Union as "odd looking, being quite different in style from any other house in town".

== See also ==
- National Register of Historic Places listings in Washington County, Maine
