= National Register of Historic Places listings in Washington County, Maine =

Location of Washington County in Maine

This is a list of the National Register of Historic Places listings in Washington County, Maine.

This is intended to be a complete list of the properties and districts on the National Register of Historic Places in Washington County, Maine, United States. Latitude and longitude coordinates are provided for many National Register properties and districts; these locations may be seen together in a map.

There are 101 properties and districts listed on the National Register in the county. Another two properties were once listed but have been removed, and one listing was relocated to a different county.

This National Park Service list is complete through NPS recent listings posted September 11, 2026.

Contents: Counties and municipalities in Maine
Androscoggin - Aroostook - Cumberland (City of Portland) - Franklin - Hancock - Kennebec - Knox - Lincoln - Oxford - Penobscot - Piscataquis - Sagadahoc - Somerset - Waldo - Washington - York

== Current listings ==
	Name on the Register	Image	Date listed	Location	City or town	Description
1	"The Rim" and Site of Fort Foster	"The Rim" and Site of Fort Foster	July 23, 1973 (#73000155)	South of East Machias off U.S. Route 1; 44°43′01″N 67°23′45″W	East Machias	
2	Archibald-Adams House	Archibald-Adams House	March 13, 1987 (#87000429)	State Route 193; 44°36′21″N 67°55′38″W	Cherryfield	
3	Atkinson-Koskinen Site 45.13		November 23, 1984 (#84000282)	Address Restricted	Steuben	
4	Charles Best House	Charles Best House	March 2, 1982 (#82000784)	County Rd. 44°56′51″N 67°10′30″W	Pembroke	
5	Birch Point		December 9, 1997 (#97000913)	Address Restricted	Machiasport	
6	Former Boynton High School	Former Boynton High School	April 11, 2002 (#02000351)	78 High St. 44°54′19″N 66°59′26″W	Eastport	Now Eastport City Hall.
7	Boynton Street Historic District	Boynton Street Historic District	July 19, 1984 (#84001542)	13-26 Boynton St. 44°54′18″N 66°59′13″W	Eastport	
8	Henrietta Brewer House	Henrietta Brewer House	October 6, 1983 (#83003688)	U.S. Route 1; 45°05′04″N 67°06′41″W	Robbinston	
9	John N.M. Brewer House	John N.M. Brewer House	October 6, 1983 (#83003690)	U.S. Route 1; 45°04′55″N 67°06′40″W	Robbinston	
10	Bucknam House	Bucknam House	April 28, 1975 (#75000113)	Main St. 44°39′15″N 67°43′33″W	Columbia Falls	
11	Samuel Bucknam House	Samuel Bucknam House	October 19, 1978 (#78000203)	Main St. 44°39′09″N 67°43′46″W	Columbia Falls	
12	Burnham Tavern	Burnham Tavern	April 11, 1973 (#73000152)	14 Colonial Way; 44°42′50″N 67°27′36″W	Machias	
13	Calais Free Library	Calais Free Library	April 12, 2001 (#01000370)	Union St., 0.05 miles northwest of its junction with U.S. Route 1; 45°11′21″N 67°16′38″W	Calais	
14	Calais Historic District	Calais Historic District	December 20, 1978 (#78000204)	Church, Main, and North Sts. 45°11′19″N 67°16′40″W	Calais	
15	Calais Observatory	Calais Observatory	December 19, 2012 (#12001069)	Meridian Park, North St. 45°11′05″N 67°16′51″W	Calais	Granite installation for performing 1857 longitude survey.
16	Calais Residential Historic District	Calais Residential Historic District	October 28, 1994 (#94001248)	Roughly the area along Main St. and Calais Ave., and from Calais Ave. to Swan St. 45°11′11″N 67°16′25″W	Calais	
17	Gen. Alexander Campbell House	Gen. Alexander Campbell House	April 13, 1977 (#77000088)	Campbell Hill; 44°35′53″N 67°55′18″W	Cherryfield	
18	David W. Campbell House	David W. Campbell House	July 19, 1984 (#84001545)	Main St. 44°36′02″N 67°55′19″W	Cherryfield	
19	Frank Campbell House	Frank Campbell House	October 29, 1982 (#82000426)	U.S. Route 1; 44°35′52″N 67°55′23″W	Cherryfield	
20	Col. Samuel Campbell House	Col. Samuel Campbell House	February 4, 1982 (#82000785)	U.S. Route 1; 44°35′54″N 67°55′18″W	Cherryfield	
21	Central Congregational Church	Central Congregational Church	June 23, 1976 (#76000116)	Middle St. 44°54′14″N 66°59′16″W	Eastport	
22	Centre Street Congregational Church	Centre Street Congregational Church	May 12, 1975 (#75000114)	Centre St. 44°42′54″N 67°27′37″W	Machias	
23	Chaloner House	Chaloner House	February 7, 2007 (#07000009)	3 Pleasant St. 44°51′42″N 66°59′06″W	Lubec	
24	Charlotte Pound		December 21, 2005 (#05001442)	Charlotte Rd., 0.25 miles east of its junction with 214; 45°00′25″N 67°16′16″W	Charlotte	
25	Cherryfield Academy	Cherryfield Academy	February 19, 1982 (#82000786)	Main St. 44°36′06″N 67°55′29″W	Cherryfield	Now houses town offices
26	Cherryfield Historic District	Cherryfield Historic District	October 1, 1990 (#90001467)	Roughly bounded by Church, Main, Park, New and High Sts., as well as River Rd. properties from U.S. Route 1 to Driscoll Island; 44°35′54″N 67°55′32″W	Cherryfield	
27	Columbia House	Columbia House	October 12, 2000 (#00001203)	Main St. at its junction with Church Hill Circle; 44°39′15″N 67°43′43″W	Columbia Falls	
28	Dennysville Historic District	Dennysville Historic District	October 29, 1982 (#82000427)	The Lane, Main, and King Sts. 44°54′01″N 67°13′45″W	Dennysville	
29	Devils Head Site		May 17, 2006 (#06000395)	Address Restricted	Calais	
30	East Machias Historic District	East Machias Historic District	April 11, 1973 (#73000153)	High, Water, and Bridge Sts. 44°44′11″N 67°23′21″W	East Machias	
31	Eastport Historic District	Eastport Historic District	June 1, 1982 (#82000787)	Water St.; 15 Sea St. 44°54′18″N 66°59′07″W	Eastport	Sea Street address represents a boundary increase July 11, 2016.
32	Fort O'Brien	Fort O'Brien	October 1, 1969 (#69000024)	South of Machiasport on a secondary road 44°41′22″N 67°23′48″W	Machiasport	
33	Fort Sullivan	Fort Sullivan	January 26, 1970 (#70000081)	Moose Island; barracks, 74 Washington St. 44°54′27″N 66°59′19″W	Eastport	
34	Jeremiah Fowler House	Jeremiah Fowler House	December 29, 1983 (#83003693)	35 School St. 44°51′37″N 66°59′14″W	Lubec	
35	Gallison Memorial Library	Gallison Memorial Library	January 11, 2001 (#00001632)	U.S. Route 1, 0.5 miles west of its junction with U.S. Route 1A; 44°37′09″N 67°48′45″W	Harrington	
36	Gates House	Gates House	April 28, 1975 (#75000115)	State Route 92; 44°41′49″N 67°23′38″W	Machiasport	
37	Gilmore House	Gilmore House	June 14, 1979 (#79000380)	764 River Road; 45°11′01″N 67°15′51″W	Calais	Listed at 316 Main Street.
38	Governors Point		August 8, 2001 (#01000812)	Address Restricted	Grand Lake Stream	
39	Grace Episcopal Church	Grace Episcopal Church	August 7, 2001 (#01000816)	U.S. Route 1 0.5 miles northwest of its junction with 3rd Rd. 45°05′14″N 67°06′53″W	Robbinston	
40	Grand Lake Stream Site		December 9, 1997 (#97000916)	Address restricted	Grand Lake Stream	
41	Thomas Hamilton House	Thomas Hamilton House	February 4, 1982 (#82000788)	78 South St. 45°10′43″N 67°16′20″W	Calais	
42	Harrington Methodist Church	Harrington Methodist Church	September 11, 2026 (#100013375)	1293 Main Street/US 1; 44°37′09″N 67°48′45″W	Harrington	
43	Hinckley Hill Historic District	Hinckley Hill Historic District	October 28, 1994 (#94001244)	Roughly 305-326 Main St. 45°10′59″N 67°15′53″W	Calais	
44	Hog Island-62.23		December 9, 1997 (#97000911)	Address restricted	Machiasport	
45	Hog Island-62.24		September 5, 1997 (#97000917)	Address restricted	Machiasport	
46	Hog Island-62.25		December 9, 1997 (#97000918)	Address restricted	Machiasport	
47	Hog Island-62.29		September 5, 1997 (#97000912)	Address restricted	Machiasport	
48	Holmes Cottage	Holmes Cottage	April 4, 1988 (#87001855)	521 Main St. 45°11′15″N 67°16′28″W	Calais	St. Croix Historical Society museum
49	Holmes Point		December 9, 1997 (#97000914)	Address restricted	Machiasport	
50	Dr. Job Holmes House	Dr. Job Holmes House	April 5, 1990 (#90000579)	527 Main St. 45°11′15″N 67°16′26″W	Calais	St. Croix Historical Society museum
51	Indian River Baptist Church		June 23, 1988 (#88000893)	State Route 187 at Indian River; 44°34′22″N 67°38′36″W	Addison	
52	Theodore Jellison House	Theodore Jellison House	November 23, 1984 (#84000274)	River Rd. 45°09′53″N 67°12′02″W	Calais	
53	Jonesboro Grange No. 357	Jonesboro Grange No. 357	December 15, 2010 (#10001035)	Harrington Road; 44°39′44″N 67°34′21″W	Jonesboro	
54	Jonesboro Union Church	Jonesboro Union Church	July 18, 2002 (#02000788)	Looks Point Rd. at its junction with U.S. Route 1; 44°39′35″N 67°34′32″W	Jonesboro	
55	Libby Island Light Station	Libby Island Light Station	June 18, 1976 (#76000117)	South of Machiasport on Libby Island; 44°34′16″N 67°21′54″W	Machiasport	
56	Liberty Hall	Liberty Hall	November 23, 1977 (#77000089)	State Route 92; 44°41′51″N 67°23′40″W	Machiasport	
57	Lincoln House	Lincoln House	March 29, 1978 (#78000206)	Maine State Route 86; 44°54′23″N 67°13′44″W	Dennysville	
58	Little River Light Station	Little River Light Station	March 14, 1988 (#88000156)	Little River Island; 44°39′02″N 67°11′39″W	Cutler	
59	Lubec Channel Light Station	Lubec Channel Light Station	March 14, 1988 (#88000152)	Lubec Channel; 44°50′31″N 66°58′38″W	Lubec	
60	Machias Post Office and Customhouse	Machias Post Office and Customhouse	November 23, 1977 (#77000090)	Main and Center Sts. 44°42′55″N 67°27′30″W	Machias	
61	Machias Railroad Station	Machias Railroad Station	October 2, 1992 (#92001293)	27 E. Main St. 44°43′10″N 67°27′08″W	Machias	
62	Machias Valley Grange, No. 360 (Former)	Machias Valley Grange, No. 360 (Former)	May 8, 2007 (#07000410)	3 Elm St. 44°42′47″N 67°27′27″W	Machias	
63	Maine Archeological Survey site 62.46		August 8, 2001 (#01000814)	On an island in Machias Bay	Machiasport	A post-contact petroglyph site with carvings of European ships
64	The Mansion House	The Mansion House	May 22, 1973 (#73000154)	North of Robbinston on U.S. Route 1; 45°05′10″N 67°06′44″W	Robbinston	
65	Marsh Stream Farm		January 12, 2016 (#15000971)	38 Marsh Stream Ln. 44°40′03″N 67°25′47″W	Machiasport	
66	McCurdy Smokehouse	McCurdy Smokehouse	July 15, 1993 (#93000638)	Eastern side of Water St. at its junction with School St. 44°51′39″N 66°59′01″W	Lubec	
67	McGlashan-Nickerson House	McGlashan-Nickerson House	June 14, 1990 (#90000920)	St. Croix Dr. near Pettegrove Pt. 45°07′30″N 67°08′54″W	Red Beach	
68	Henry D. Moore Parish House and Library	Henry D. Moore Parish House and Library	November 29, 2001 (#01001272)	3 Rogers Point Rd. 44°30′39″N 67°57′43″W	Steuben	
69	Narraguagus Light Station	Narraguagus Light Station	November 20, 1987 (#87002022)	Eastern side of Pond Island; 44°27′15″N 67°49′44″W	Milbridge	
70	William M. Nash House	William M. Nash House	January 4, 1983 (#83000477)	River Rd. 44°36′02″N 67°55′42″W	Cherryfield	
71	Ntolonapemk, Eastern Surplus Superfund Site		August 8, 2001 (#01000819)	Roughly bounded by State Route 191, Stone Road, Meddybemps Lake, and the Dennys River; 45°02′18″N 67°21′31″W	Meddybemps	
72	Patten Building	Patten Building	December 22, 1978 (#78000207)	Main St. 44°35′54″N 67°55′30″W	Cherryfield	
73	Clark Perry House	Clark Perry House	October 9, 1979 (#79000169)	Court St. 44°42′55″N 67°27′40″W	Machias	
74	Petit Manan Light Station	Petit Manan Light Station	October 30, 1987 (#87001879)	Petit Manan Island; 44°22′03″N 67°51′53″W	Milbridge	
75	Joshua Pettegrove House	Joshua Pettegrove House	March 17, 1994 (#94000179)	Eastern side of U.S. Route 1, 0.25 miles north of its junction with Shattuck Rd. 45°07′32″N 67°08′47″W	Red Beach	
76	Pike's Mile Markers	Pike's Mile Markers	January 20, 1995 (#94001548)	Twelve locations spaced 1 miles apart along the eastern side of U.S. Route 1 between Robbinston and Calais; 45°10′04″N 67°14′01″W	Calais	
77	Capt. John Plummer House	Capt. John Plummer House	January 21, 2009 (#08001358)	23 Pleasant St. 44°37′08″N 67°44′36″W	Addison	
78	Porter Memorial Library	Porter Memorial Library	January 20, 1978 (#78000208)	Court St. 44°42′55″N 67°27′36″W	Machias	
79	Reversing Falls Site		June 27, 1990 (#90000907)	Address Restricted	Pembroke	
80	Ruggles House	Ruggles House	January 26, 1970 (#70000080)	Main Street; 44°39′08″N 67°43′49″W	Columbia Falls	
81	St. Anne's Episcopal Church	St. Anne's Episcopal Church	July 8, 1982 (#82000789)	Church St. 45°11′16″N 67°16′31″W	Calais	
82	St. Croix Island International Historic Site	St. Croix Island International Historic Site	October 15, 1966 (#66000932)	St. Croix Island, on the US side of the St. Croix River; 45°07′42″N 67°08′02″W	St. Croix Junction	
83	Sewall Memorial Congregational Church	Sewall Memorial Congregational Church	December 19, 2012 (#12001070)	558 U.S. Route 1; 45°05′04″N 67°06′42″W	Robbinston	Misspelled "Sewell" in the National Register listing.
84	James R. Talbot House	James R. Talbot House	January 4, 1983 (#83000478)	U.S. Route 1; 44°44′18″N 67°23′28″W	East Machias	
85	Todd House	Todd House	April 23, 1980 (#80000258)	11 Capens Ave. 44°54′41″N 66°59′09″W	Eastport	
86	Union Church, (former)	Union Church, (former)	July 5, 2000 (#00000759)	Main St., 0.1 miles northeast of its junction with Addison Rd. 44°39′12″N 67°43′46″W	Columbia Falls	
87	Union Evangelical Church		June 7, 1996 (#96000654)	Northern side of Addison Ridge Rd., 2 miles south of U.S. Route 1; 44°36′59″N 67°45′20″W	Addison	
88	Union Hall	Union Hall	June 25, 1987 (#87000938)	Near the junction of U.S. Route 1 and State Route 169; 45°39′29″N 67°52′02″W	Danforth	
89	Union Meeting House	Union Meeting House	April 11, 2014 (#14000139)	153 US Route 1; 44°47′27″N 67°10′32″W	Whiting	
90	U.S. Inspection Station-Calais (Ferry Point), Maine	U.S. Inspection Station-Calais (Ferry Point), Maine	September 10, 2014 (#14000559)	1 Main St. 45°11′27″N 67°17′01″W	Calais	
91	Everett Wallace House	Everett Wallace House	March 7, 1996 (#96000243)	Western side of U.S. Route 1, 0.05 miles north of its junction with Wyman Rd. 44°31′57″N 67°52′59″W	Milbridge	
92	George Washburn House	George Washburn House	February 11, 1982 (#82000790)	772 River Road; 45°10′59″N 67°15′50″W	Calais	Listed at 318 Main Street.
93	Washington County Courthouse	Washington County Courthouse	November 7, 1976 (#76000119)	Court St. 44°42′58″N 67°27′36″W	Machias	
94	Washington County Jail	Washington County Jail	April 7, 1988 (#88000393)	Court St. 44°42′58″N 67°27′35″W	Machias	
95	David and Hadassah Wass House		June 14, 2022 (#100007806)	293 Water St. 44°37′08″N 67°44′41″W	Addison	
96	West Quoddy Head Light Station	West Quoddy Head Light Station	July 4, 1980 (#80004601)	Southeast of Lubec on West Quoddy Head; 44°48′54″N 66°57′00″W	Lubec	
97	West Quoddy Lifesaving Station	West Quoddy Lifesaving Station	April 20, 1990 (#90000581)	Northern side of W. Quoddy Head; 44°49′04″N 66°57′59″W	Lubec	
98	Whitlocks Mill Light Station	Whitlocks Mill Light Station	January 21, 1988 (#87002276)	Southern bank of the St. Croix River; 45°09′46″N 67°13′41″W	Calais	
99	Whitneyville Congregational Church	Whitneyville Congregational Church	June 26, 1979 (#79000170)	Main St. 44°43′19″N 67°31′24″W	Whitneyville	
100	Windswept	Windswept	May 8, 2007 (#07000411)	421 Petit Manan Point Rd. 44°25′05″N 67°54′45″W	Steuben	
101	Daniel Young House	Daniel Young House	March 22, 1984 (#84001547)	34 Main St. 44°51′39″N 66°59′15″W	Lubec	

== Former and moved listings ==
	Name on the Register	Image	Date listed	Date removed	Location	City or town	Description
1	Columbia Union Church	Columbia Union Church	June 20, 1997 (#97000607)	June 6, 2024	Northern side of State Route 29-608 (Epping Road), 0.05 miles east of its junction with State Route 29-610 (Cemetery Road); 44°40′59″N 67°46′48″W	Epping (Columbia, Maine)	Condemned in 2019, and collapsed in 2024.
2	First Congregational Church		December 20, 1978 (#78000205)	April 29, 2004	Calais Avenue	Lubec	Destroyed by fire on February 21, 1992.
3	The Lion (locomotive)	The Lion (locomotive)	December 15, 1976 (#76000118)	moved in 1985	Maine State Museum; 44°42′30″N 67°27′21″W	Augusta	Originally listed while on display at the University of Maine at Machias.

== See also ==
- List of National Historic Landmarks in Maine
- National Register of Historic Places listings in Maine
