= Calais Historic District =

Historic district in Maine, United States

- U.S. National Register of Historic Places
- U.S. Historic district
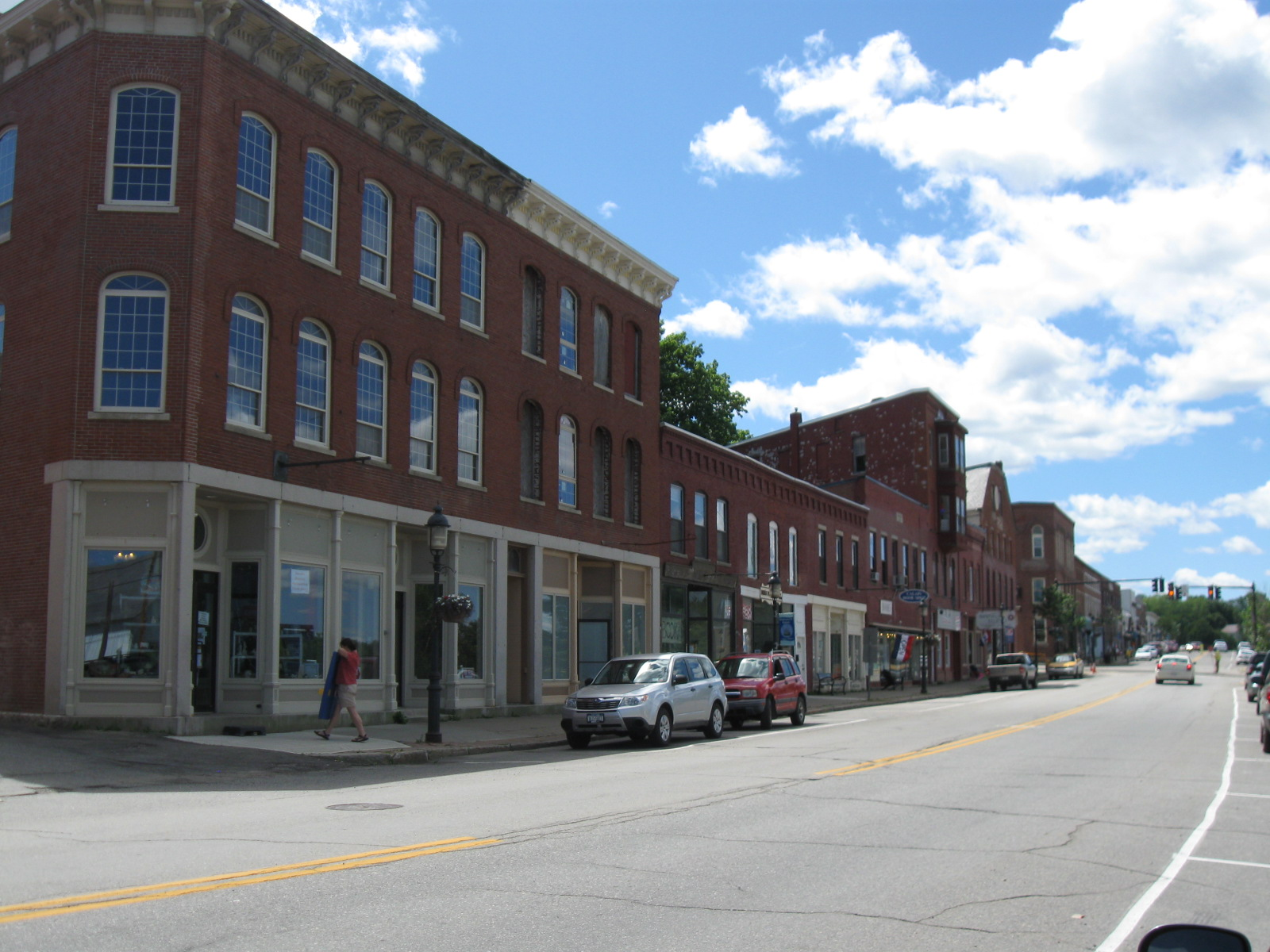
- Main Street in Calais

- Location within Maine Location within the United States
- Location: Church, Main and North Sts., Calais, Maine
- Coordinates: 45°11′20″N 67°16′38″W
- Area: 2 acres (0.81 ha)
- Architectural style: Greek Revival, Italianate, Romanesque Revival
- NRHP reference No.: 78000204
- Added to NRHP: December 20, 1978

The Calais Historic District encompasses a city block of 19th-century commercial buildings in the center of Calais, Maine. The district, developed after a fire devastated the area in 1870, contains a cohesive concentration of brick Italianate architecture. The district was listed on the National Register of Historic Places in 1978.

== Description and history ==
The city of Calais is located in far eastern Maine, at the head of tide of the Saint Croix River, which forms the international border with the Canadian province of New Brunswick. Calais was incorporated as a city in 1850, and was at the time a center of the lumber and shipbuilding industries. In August 1870 a devastating fire swept through the city's central business district, destroying a large number of wood frame commercial buildings. Within one year, a significant portion of the area had been rebuilt, primarily in brick.

The historic district encompasses a one block stretch on the south side of Main Street, between North and Church Streets, and includes a few buildings along the latter two streets. All of the buildings along Main Street but one, were built in wake of the 1870 fire, and exhibit Italianate styling popular at that time. The exception is the Hill Building at 153 Main, which is a three-story brick Greek Revival structure built in 1847. The two buildings on the east side of North Street that extend south from the Hill Building are also Greek Revival buildings from the 1840s and 1850s.

The two buildings on Church Street that are part of the district are both civic buildings. Calais City Hall, located at 15 Church Street, is a Romanesque Revival structure built in 1901, and the former fire station at 13 Church Street was built in 1874, with its tower and belfry added in 1895-96. City Hall was designed by H. A. Crosby.

== See also ==
- National Register of Historic Places listings in Washington County, Maine
