= Todd House (Eastport, Maine) =

Historic house in Maine, United States

- U.S. National Register of Historic Places
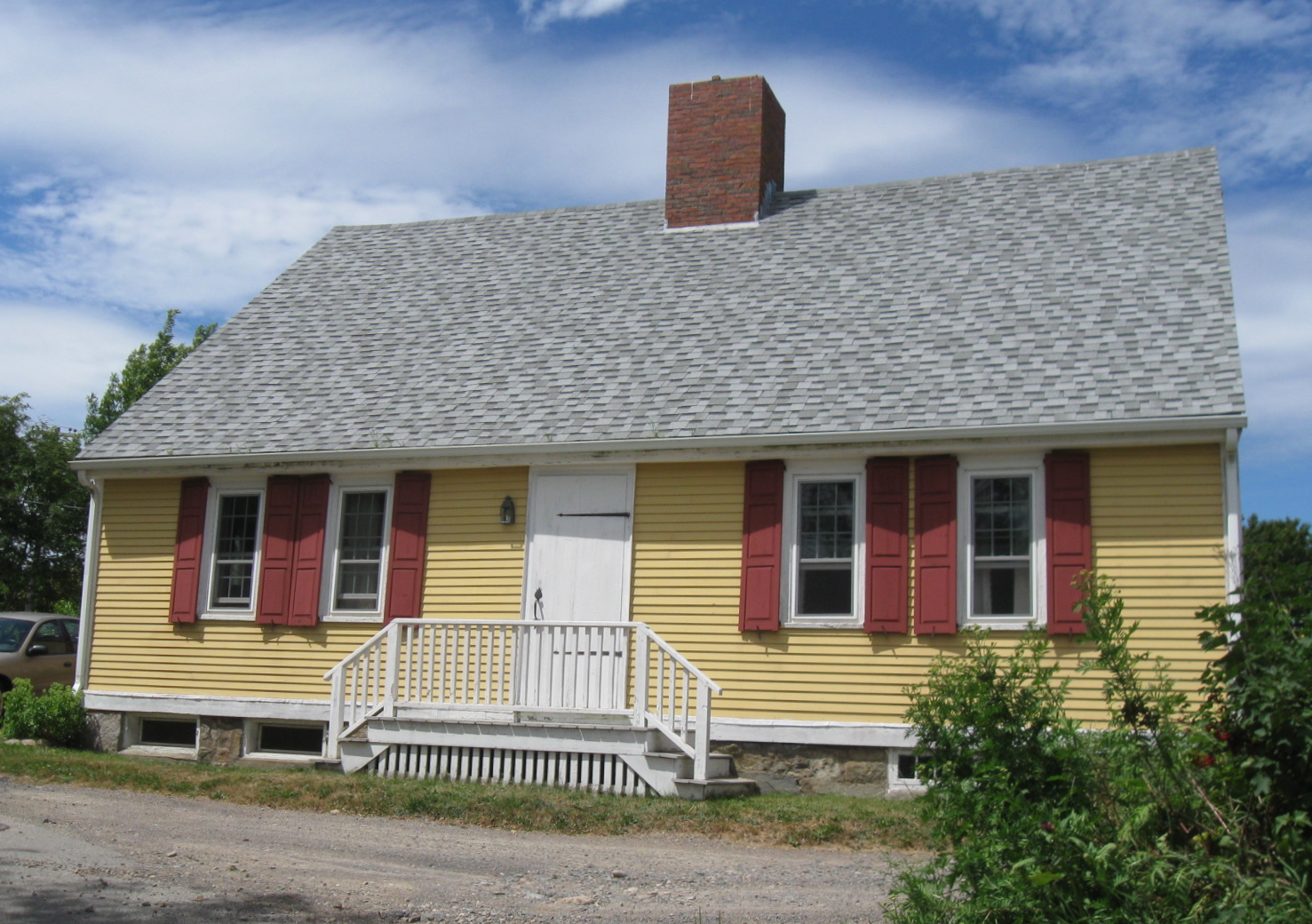

- Location within Maine Location within the United States
- Location: 11 Capen Ave., Eastport, Maine
- Coordinates: 44°54′41″N 66°59′9″W
- Area: 0.3 acres (0.12 ha)
- Built: 1781
- Architectural style: Cape Cod
- NRHP reference No.: 80000258
- Added to NRHP: April 23, 1980

The Todd House is a historic house at 11 Capen Avenue in Eastport, Maine. Built about 1775, it is believed to be the city's oldest surviving building. It was listed on the National Register of Historic Places in 1980. It now houses a bed and breakfast inn.

== Description and history ==
The Todd House stands at the northeast corner of Capen Avenue and Water Street, north of the city center, and overlooking the St. Croix River. It is a 1 1/2-story wood-frame Cape style house, five bays wide, with a side-gable roof, central chimney, clapboard siding, and stone foundation. Its south-facing facade is symmetrical, with the front entrance topped by a transom window. Inside, it follows a typical center-chimney plan, with a narrow vestibule in front of the chimney that also has a winding stair to the attic level, and parlor spaces on either side. A single-story ell extends to the rear of the building.

The house's exact construction date is unknown; it is assumed to be the single house located on Moose Island on a 1781 navigational chart. Its earliest recorded owner is John C. Todd. Moose Island (where most of Eastport is located) was first settled in 1772 by fishermen. In 1801, the house was adapted for use by the newly formed local Masonic lodge, using the attic-level space as a meeting hall. When Eastport was occupied by British forces during the War of 1812, some of their officers were quartered here. Returned in 1818, it continued to be used by the Masons until 1887, when they moved to a purpose-built hall.

== See also ==
- National Register of Historic Places listings in Washington County, Maine
