= James R. Talbot House =

Historic house in Maine, United States

- U.S. National Register of Historic Places
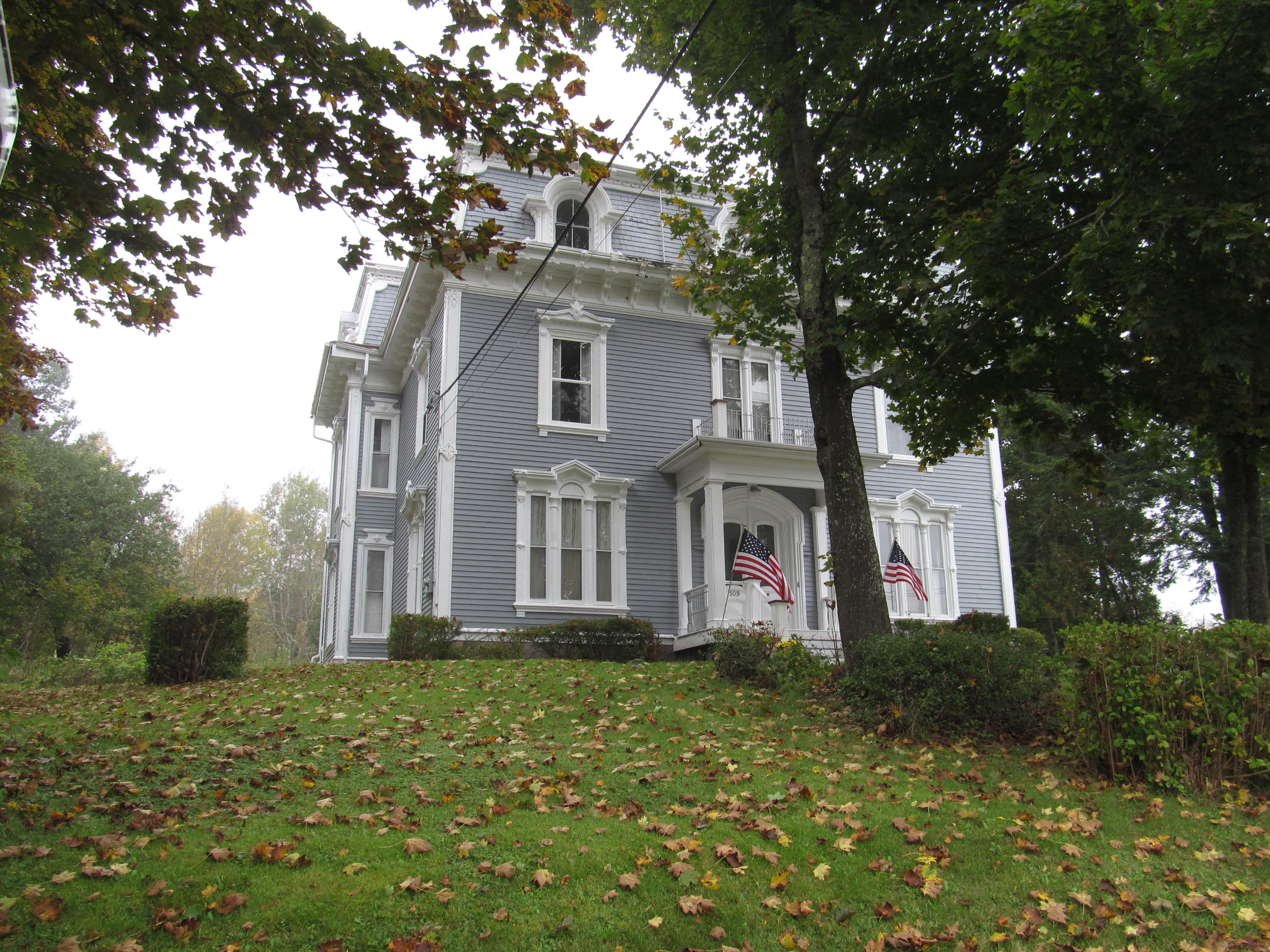

- Location within Maine Location within the United States
- Location: US 1, East Machias, Maine
- Coordinates: 44°44′18″N 67°23′28″W
- Area: 0.5 acres (0.20 ha)
- Built: 1874
- Architect: James A. Tenney
- Architectural style: Mansard
- NRHP reference No.: 83000478
- Added to NRHP: January 4, 1983

The James R. Talbot House is a historic house at 509 Main Street (United States Route 1) in East Machias, Maine. Built in 1874, it is one of the finest examples of the Second Empire style in eastern Washington County. It now houses The Talbot House Inn, a bed and breakfast establishment. It was listed on the National Register of Historic Places in 1983.

== Description and history ==
The Talbot House is located on the west side of US 1 in East Machias, just south of its junction with Maine State Route 191. It is a three-story wood-frame structure, with a mansard roof and clapboard siding. The steep portion of the mansard roof is finished in wood shingles, and is studded with round-arch dormers. The cornice is modillioned, and the building corners are pilastered. The main facade is three bays wide, with a center entrance sheltered by an elaborate flat-roof porch. Windows are framed by decorative bracketed and gabled surrounds. The windows flanking the main entrance are narrow tripled sash, with a similar doubled French door above the entrance. Other windows are more conventionally sized sash, although projecting sections on the sides have narrow windows on the sides.

The house was built in 1874 for James Talbot, one of the area's leading lumber manufacturers and shipbuilders. It was designed by Portland architect James A. Tenney, and is the only one of his Second Empire designs in Washington County (of three known) to survive.

== See also ==
- National Register of Historic Places listings in Washington County, Maine
