= Machias Post Office and Customhouse =

- U.S. National Register of Historic Places
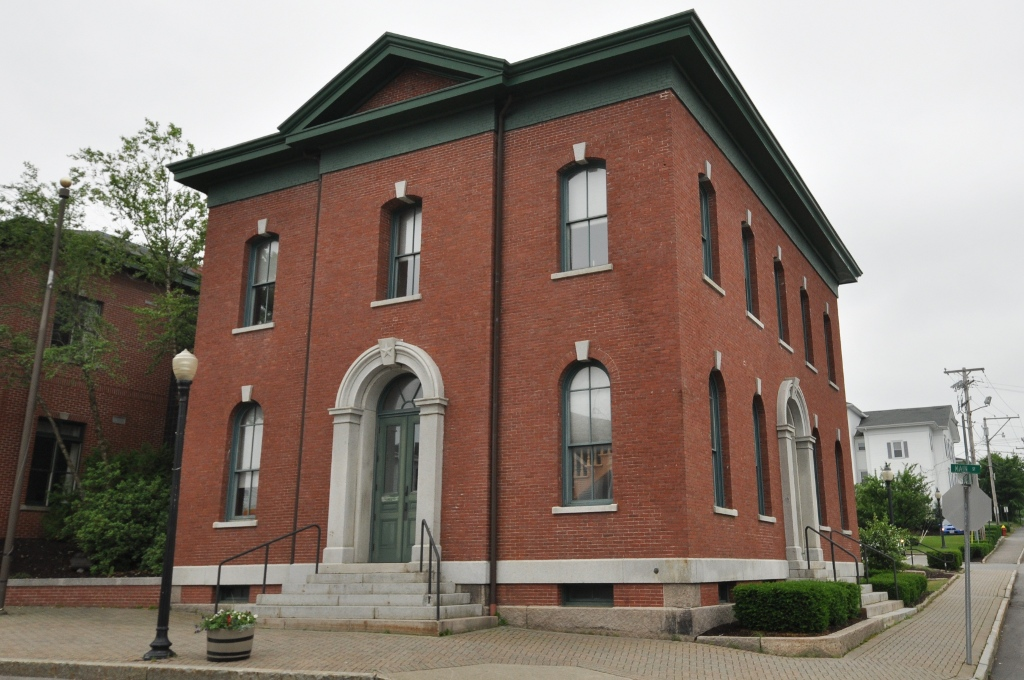

- Location within Maine Location within the United States
- Location: Main and Center Sts., Machias, Maine
- Coordinates: 44°42′55″N 67°27′30″W
- Area: 0.5 acres (0.20 ha)
- Built: 1872
- Built by: Horatio L. Hill
- Architect: Alfred B. Mullett
- Architectural style: Italianate
- NRHP reference No.: 77000090
- Added to NRHP: November 23, 1977

The former Machias Post Office and Customhouse is a historic government building at Maine and Center Streets in Machias, Maine. Built in 1872, it is a prominent local example of Italianate architecture executed in brick. The building was listed on the National Register of Historic Places in 1977. It now houses offices of the Machias Savings Bank.

== Description and history ==
The Machias Post Office and Customhouse is located at the western corner of Center Street and Main Street (United States Route 1) in the heart of Machias' downtown area. It is a two-story red brick building, topped by a hip roof and set on a granite foundation. Its main facade faces Main Street, and is a symmetrical three bays wide, with the center bay projecting slightly and capped by a fully pedimented gable. One principal entrance is on the first floor of that section, set in a round-arch opening with keystone and pilastered columns. Windows are set in round-arch openings on the first floor and segmented-arch openings on the second, with stone sills and keystones. The Center Street facade is five bays wide, with a similar arrangement and styling of doors and windows.

Early federal government facilities in Machias were located in leased spaces secured by the postmasters and customs collectors, a condition eventually found inadequate due to frequently changing addresses, and spaces that were not properly configured for the purpose. In 1867 the United States Congress authorized construction of this building, for which the land was acquired in 1870, and the construction completed in 1872. The building was designed by Alfred B. Mullett, the supervising architect of the United States Treasury Department, and the construction was supervised by Horatio L. Hill, a local builder and architect. In order to save costs, materials were sourced locally.

== See also ==
- National Register of Historic Places listings in Washington County, Maine
- List of United States post offices
