= Indian River Baptist Church (Addison, Maine) =

Historic church in Maine, United States

- U.S. National Register of Historic Places
- Location within Maine Location within the United States
- Location: ME 187 at the Indian River, Addison, Maine
- Coordinates: 44°34′22″N 67°38′33″W
- Area: less than one acre
- Built: 1853
- Architect: Norman Ward
- Architectural style: Italianate
- NRHP reference No.: 88000893
- Added to NRHP: June 23, 1988

The Indian River Baptist Church is a historic former church building on Maine State Route 187, near its crossing of the Indian River in Addison, Maine. Built in 1853-54, it is one of the community's most sophisticated architectural structures, exhibiting transitional Greek Revival and Italianate styling. It was listed on the National Register of Historic Places in 1988. The building is now maintained by a local nonprofit organization.

== Description and history ==
The former Indian River Baptist Church is located in eastern Addison, on the east side of Indian River Road (ME 187), just north of its junction with Crowley Island Road, and of its crossing of the Indian River near its mouth. It is a modestly sized single-story wood frame structure, with a front-facing gable roof topped by a square tower, clapboard siding, and a granite foundation. The tower is a short two-stage structure centered on the ridge above the front facade, with grouped square columns surrounding an open belfry, and a square louvered cupola with pyramidal roof above. The front facade is symmetrical, with a pair of entrances flanking a large central sash window. The entrances are flanked on both sides by paneled pilasters that rise to a full entablature; pilasters are also found at the building corners. The front-facing gable is fully pedimented. The entablature is continued around the sides, which each have three large sash windows. The interior retains original flooring, plaster walls, and pews.

The origins of the Indian River Baptist congregation are uncertain, but it had grown by 1853 to accept the land on which this church was built as a gift from Susannah K. Emerson. The church was built in 1853-54 by Norman Ward, a local builder. Since most of Addison's 19th-century architecture is vernacular residential work, this building stands out for its distinctive Italianate and Greek Revival features. The church is relatively unaltered since its construction; the tower, built 1905-10, is its only major alteration. The church was by then nearly inactive, and the building was maintained by local volunteers, who organized as the Indian Risver Community Association and took over its ownership in 1986.

== See also ==
- National Register of Historic Places in Washington County, Maine
