= Eastport Historic District =

Historic district in Maine, United States

- U.S. National Register of Historic Places
- U.S. Historic district
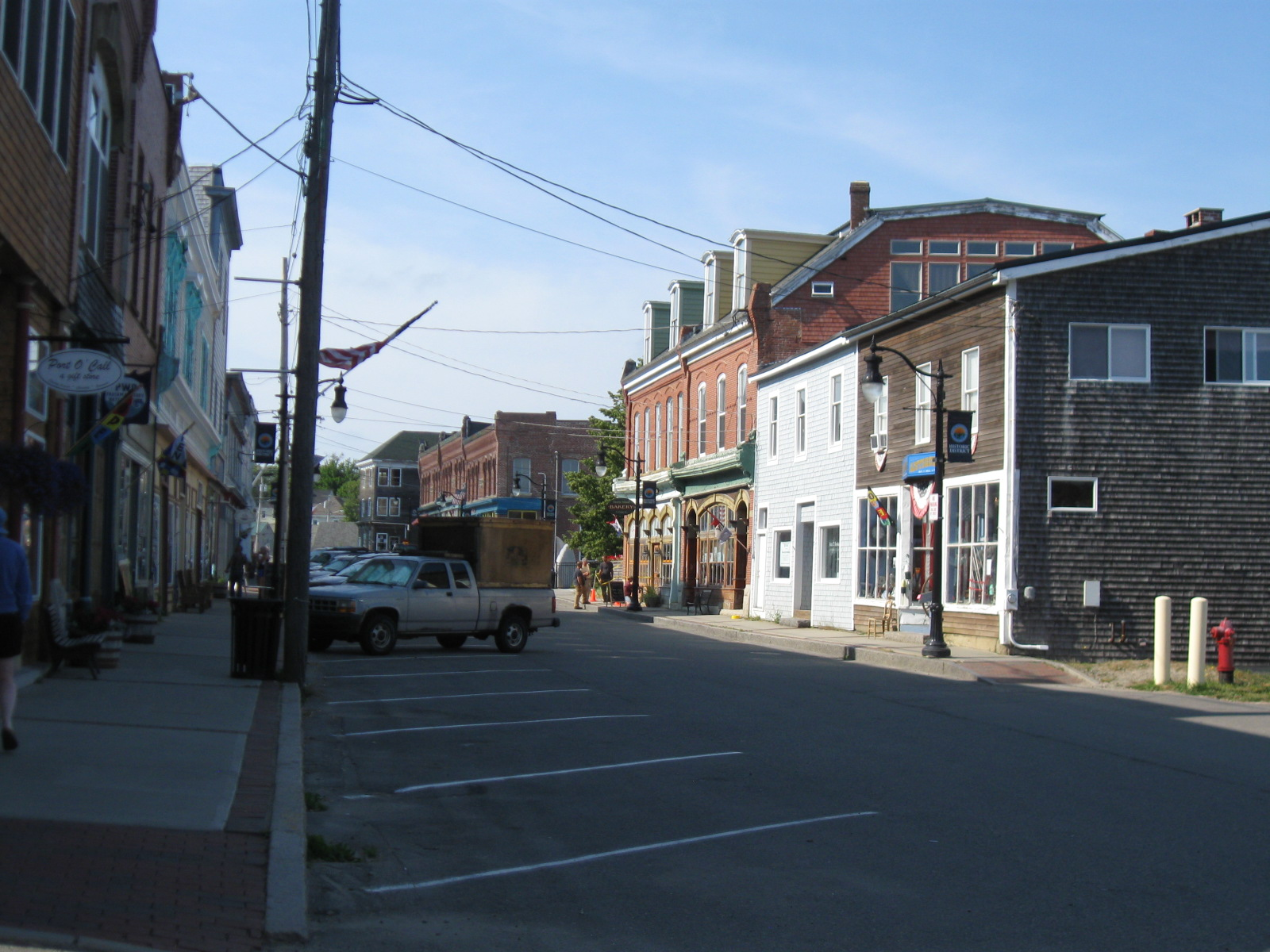
- Water Street in 2012

- Location within Maine Location within the United States
- Location: Water St., Eastport, Maine
- Coordinates: 44°54′15″N 66°59′4″W
- Area: 8 acres (3.2 ha); 0.85 acres (0.34 ha) (size of 2016 increase)
- Built: 1887
- Architect: Black, Henry
- Architectural style: Italianate, Romanesque
- NRHP reference No.: 82000787 (original); 16000439 (increase)

Significant dates
- Added to NRHP: June 1, 1982
- Boundary increase: July 11, 2016

The Eastport Historic District encompasses the late 19th-century commercial center of the city of Eastport, Maine. Set on a five-block stretch of Water Street, this area was almost completely redeveloped after a major fire in 1886, and many of its buildings are the work of a single architect, Henry Black. The district was listed on the National Register of Historic Places in 1982, and enlarged slightly in 2016.

== Description and history ==
The city of Eastport is located on Moose Island at the far southeastern tip of Maine, with the Canadian province of New Brunswick just across Passamaquoddy Bay. In the mid-19th century, Eastport served as a major regional commercial center, and developed a significant sardine-packing industry in the 1870s. On October 14, 1886, a fire devastated the city center, destroying its central business district and its commercial wharves. In the following year, the city rebuilt its downtown.

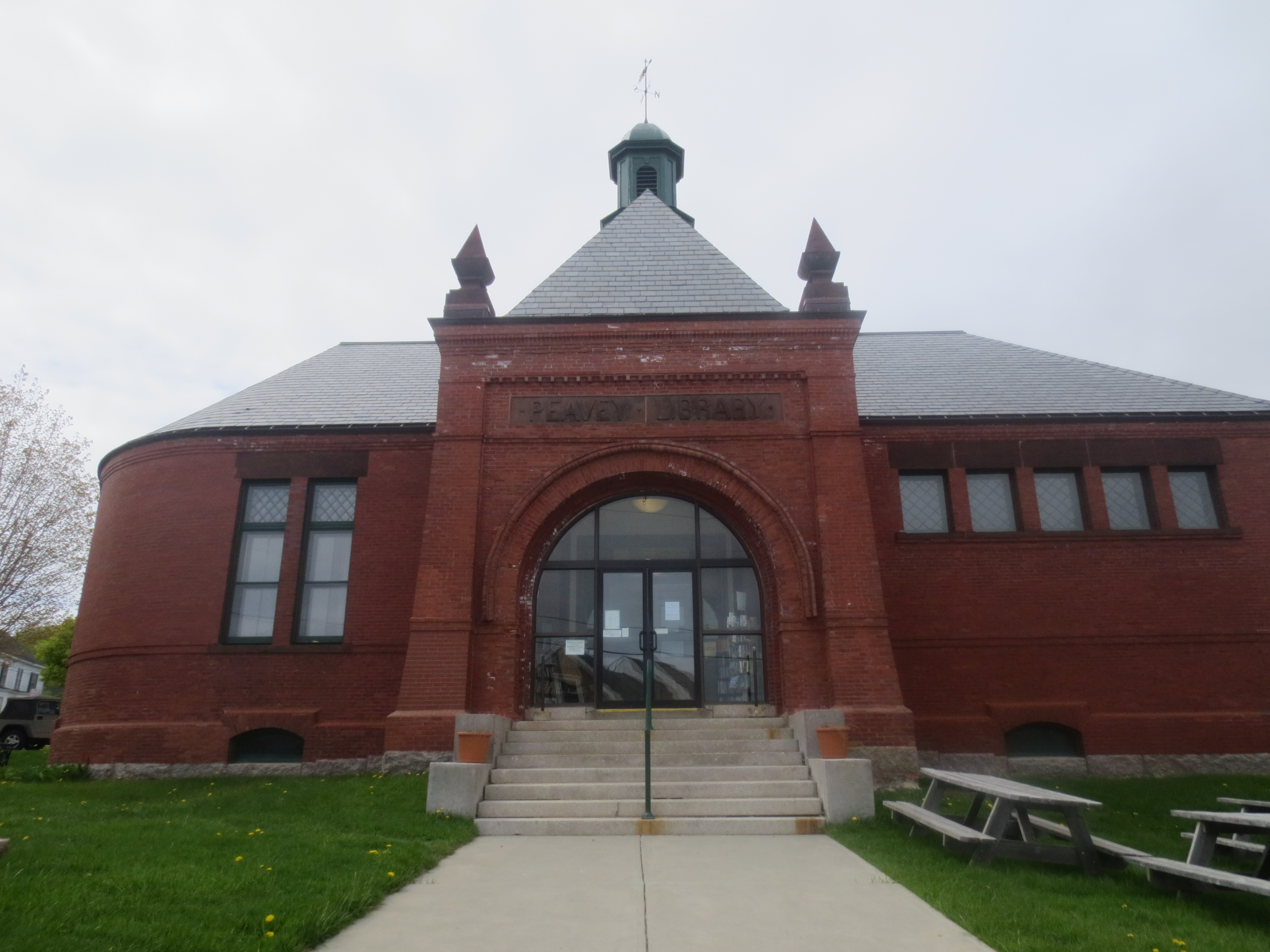
Peavey Memorial Library

The rebuilt area extends along Water Street, the city's east-facing waterfront area, between Sullivan and Key Streets. There are 26 buildings that were built in 1887, with two more added by 1893, and one in 1928–29. Fourteen of the 1887 buildings were designed (or have been attributed to) Henry Black, an architect who had been based for some years in Saint John, New Brunswick. Black arrived in Eastport in February 1887, and was apparently the only architect directly involved in the rebuilding effort. Buildings typifying his work include the Eastport Savings Bank at 41 Water Street, and the Ferris & Son building at 4 Boynton Street, both Italianate in style, one in brick and the other in wood. Other architect-designed buildings in the district include the Peavey Memorial Library (1893, Rotch and Tilden), and the Frontier National Bank at 30 Water Street (1882, Charles Kimball). Most of the district's buildings are brick Italianate structures, although some are wooden, and the library is Romanesque in style. The 2016 enlargement added the former Seacoast Canning Company plant at 15 Sea Street; it was built in 1908 for what was at the time the world's largest sardine cannery company.

== See also ==
- National Register of Historic Places listings in Washington County, Maine
