= Columbia Union Church =

Historic church in Maine, United States

- Formerly listed on the U.S. National Register of Historic Places
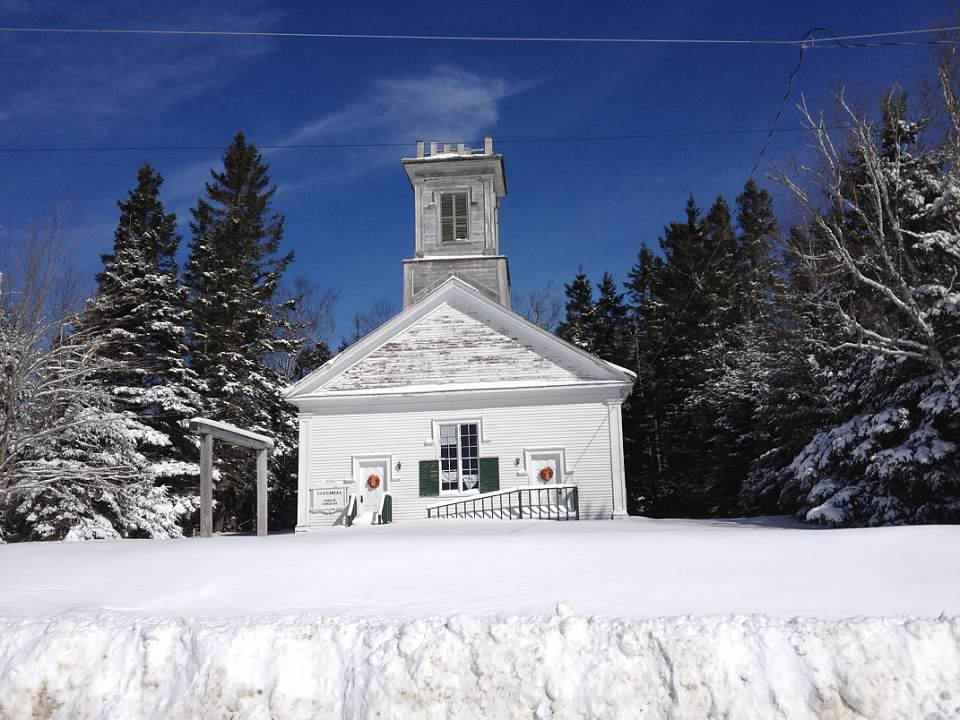
- Columbia Union Church in 2015

- Location within Maine Location within the United States
- Nearest city: Epping, Maine
- Coordinates: 44°40′59″N 67°46′48″W
- Area: less than one acre
- Built: 1829; 1870
- Architectural style: Greek Revival, Gothic Revival
- NRHP reference No.: 97000607

Significant dates
- Added to NRHP: June 20, 1997
- Removed from NRHP: June 6, 2024

Columbia Union Church, originally Epping Baptist Church, was a historic church in Epping, the northeastern part of Columbia, Maine. Built in 1829 and extensively altered in 1870, it is a fine example of a Greek Revival church with Gothic alterations. It was listed on the National Register of Historic Places in 1997, and was delisted in 2024 after collapsing in 2023.

== Description and history ==
The Columbia Union Church was located in northeastern Columbia, on the north side of Epping Road just east of its junction with Cemetery Road. It was a single-story wood frame structure, with a front-facing gable roof, clapboard and shingle siding, and a granite foundation. The front facade faced south, and had a fully pedimented gable above a pair of entrances that flanked a central window. The doors and window were topped by Gothic drip molding, which was also found on other windows. The building's corners have pilasters, which rose to an entablature that encircled the building. A two-stage tower rose above the front, with windows in the second stage and crenellations above. The tower featured drip molding, pilasters and friezes similar to those found on the main body. The building was condemned by the Town of Columbia in 2019, and collapsed on February 16th, 2023.

Built in 1829 as the Epping Baptist Church, this was the first church building to be built within the municipal bounds of Columbia, which was incorporated in 1796. The congregation had been meeting in private homes since 1788 prior to construction of this building. It is unclear at what point the building's use changed to that of a union church (serving multiple denominations), but the Columbia Union Society was formally organized in 1866 to oversee the building's rehabilitation. Under that organization's oversight the building was renovated, adding Gothic features such as the tower crenellations and drip molding.

== See also ==
- National Register of Historic Places listings in Washington County, Maine
