= Narraguagus Light =

Lighthouse in Maine, US

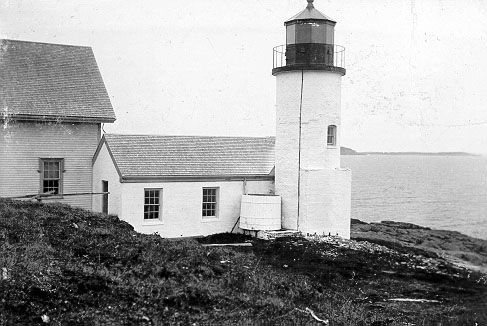
- Location: Narraguagus Bay
- Coordinates: 44°27′21.5″N 67°49′52.35″W

Tower
- Constructed: 1853
- Foundation: Stone
- Construction: Granite blocks
- Height: 9.5 m (31 ft)
- Shape: Cylindrical attached to workroom
- Markings: White
- Heritage: National Register of Historic Places listed place

Light
- Deactivated: 1934
- Narraguagus Light Station
- U.S. National Register of Historic Places
- U.S. Historic district
- Nearest city: Milbridge, Maine
- Area: 1.5 acres (0.61 ha)
- Architect: US Army Corps of Engineers
- MPS: Light Stations of Maine MPS
- NRHP reference No.: 87002022
- Added to NRHP: November 20, 1987

Narraguagus Light is a lighthouse on Pond Island at the southern extent of Narraguagus Bay in Downeast Maine. It was built as an aid to navigation for the bay, and the port of Milbridge, then an important deep-water shipbuilding port. It was deactivated in 1934, and is now privately owned. It was listed on the National Register of Historic Places as "Narraguagus Light Station" on November 20, 1987.

== Description and history ==
Narraguagus Bay is a broad and deep indentation on the northeastern coast of Maine, and is dotted with islands and rock ledges. The Narraguagus River empties into the west side of the bay, where the town of Milbridge is located. Pond Island is one of the larger islands marking the southern extent of the bay, where it opens into the larger Gulf of Maine. Narraguagus Light is set in a small clearing on the east side of the island.

The light station consists of a circular brick tower, from which an L-shaped work room connects to the keeper's residence. The tower is 31 feet (9.4 m) from base to lantern, with an iron deck and railing surrounding the ten-sided lantern house, from which the lens has been removed. The lantern house is capped by a spherical ventilator. The L-shaped workroom is a single-story brick structure, and the keeper's house is a 1 1/2-story wood-frame structure. The property also includes two wood-frame sheds.

The light station was established in 1853, one year after the United States Lighthouse Board was established to build and manage the nation's lighthouses. The tower is original, dating to 1853, and was originally built with the keeper's house around it. The current keeper's house dates to 1875, around the time when the present lantern house railing was installed. The light was deactivated in 1934, and the property has been sold into private hands.

== Keepers ==
- Joseph Brown (1853-1853)
- Wyman Collins (1853-1859)
- Daniel Chipman (1859-1861)
- Alfred Wallace (1861-1862)
- James Wallace (1862-1865)
- Joseph W. Brown (1865-1869)
- George L. Upton (1869-1876)
- Solomon Y. Kelliher (1876-1880)
- Ambrose Wallace (1880-1882)
- Warren A. Murch (1882-1885)
- James M. Gates (1885-1893)
- William C. Gott (1893-1918)
- Lester Leighton (1918-1924)
- Alvah Robinson (1924-1926)
- Charles E. Tracy (1926-1933)

== See also ==
- National Register of Historic Places listings in Washington County, Maine
