= Everett Wallace House =

Historic house in Maine, United States

- U.S. National Register of Historic Places
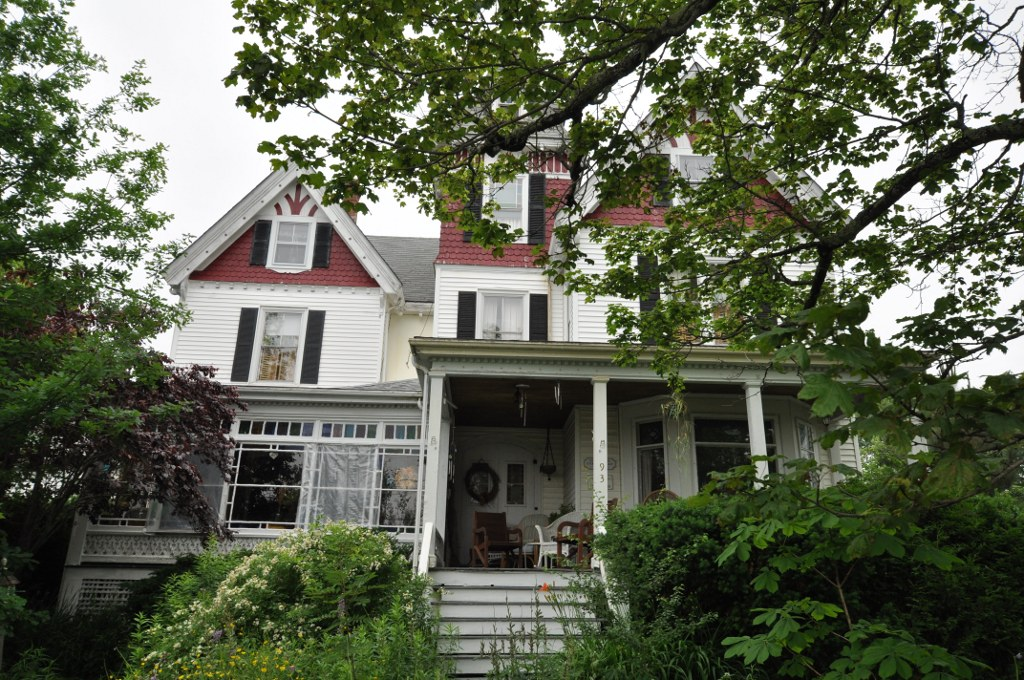

- Location within Maine Location within the United States
- Location: US 1 W side, .05 mi. N of jct. with Wyman Rd., Milbridge, Maine
- Coordinates: 44°31′57″N 67°52′59″W
- Area: less than one acre
- Built: 1938
- Architectural style: Queen Anne
- NRHP reference No.: 96000243
- Added to NRHP: March 7, 1996

The Everett Wallace House is a historic house on United States Route 1 in Milbridge, Maine. Built in 1938, it is unusual as a late example of Queen Anne architecture, having been built as a near replica of the owner's previous house, which was destroyed by fire in 1937. The house was listed on the National Register of Historic Places in 1996.

== Description and history ==
The Everett Wallace House stands in the southern part of the village center of Milbridge, on the west side of US 1 just north of its junction with Wyman Road. It is set on a lot fronted by a picket fence along with a two-car detached garage. The house is a 2 1/2-story wood-frame structure, with asymmetrical styling typical of the Queen Anne period. It has a steeply pitched gabled roof, a brick foundation, and an exterior clad in a variety of finishes, including wooden shingles, aluminum siding, and applied Stick style half timbering. It is roughly L-shaped, its shape somewhat obscured by single-story porches along the front, one of which has been enclosed in glass. Its front is in three sections, with a central three-story tower flanked by a projecting gabled section on the right and a recessed one on the left.

The house was built by Everett Wallace, a local merchant, in 1938, after the family's 1890s Queen Anne Victorian was destroyed by fire in 1937. The basic design appears to have been taken from a pattern book, since a nearly identical 1890s house stands in Boothbay Harbor. The earlier Wallace House is documented from a series of postcards produced in the early 20th century.

The house is located at 93 Main Street. The present owner has cleared out much of the overgrowth, so the house is now more visible as of August 2025.

== See also ==
- National Register of Historic Places listings in Washington County, Maine
