= Governors Point =

- U.S. National Register of Historic Places
- Nearest city: Grand Lake Stream Plantation, Maine
- Area: 0.8 acres (0.32 ha)
- NRHP reference No.: 01000812
- Added to NRHP: August 8, 2001

Governors Point, designed Site 95.18 by the Maine Archaeological Survey, is a prehistoric and historic archaeological site in Grand Lake Stream, Maine. With a documented record of historical occupation into the 19th century by the Passamaquoddy people (on whose tribal land it is located), and archaeological evidence spanning nearly 3000 years of habitation, the site is one of the most important in eastern Maine. The site was listed on the National Register of Historic Places in 2001.

== Description ==
The Governors Point site was first identified in 1986 by a state archaeological survey team, and was subjected to intense activity between 1988 and 1992 to recover artifacts and determine its scope. Materials recovered from the site include examples of virtually every type of stone projectile point seen elsewhere in Maine, fashioned from stone sourced from Pennsylvania and New York to Newfoundland. Further evidence indicates that the site was a major seasonal occupation site across the enter Ceramic/Woodland Period, extending back about 2,800 years.

Of particular significance are artifacts recovered from the site that date to the Early Contact Period. These early 17th-century artifacts are particularly rare in Maine, and include fragments of glassware, kaolin smoking pipes, trade beads, gun flints of French manufacture, and a copper artifact interpreted to be a knife.

The site is also likely to be a major settlement referenced in historical documents dating to the American Revolutionary War period, and was explicitly referenced in a 1794 treaty between the state of Massachusetts (which Maine was then a part of) and the Passamaquoddy tribe. The land was sold out of tribal control in 1800 by a chief, a transaction that was ruled illegal in Massachusetts, but confirmed after Maine achieved statehood in 1820.

== See also ==
- National Register of Historic Places listings in Washington County, Maine
