= Chaloner House =

Historic house in Maine, United States

- U.S. National Register of Historic Places
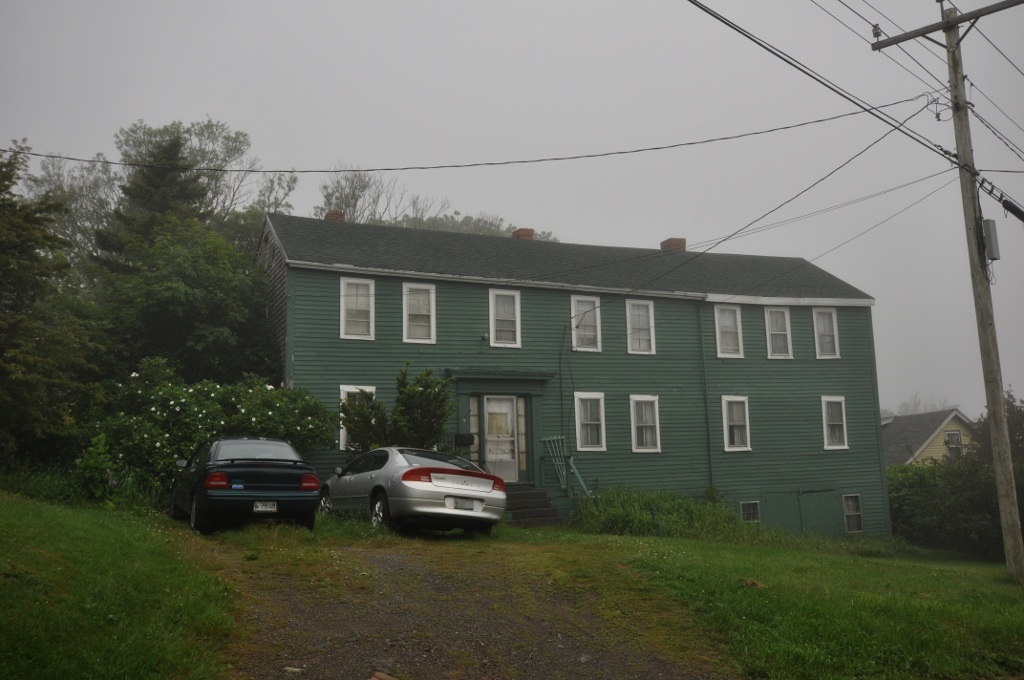

- Location within Maine Location within the United States
- Location: 3 Pleasant St., Lubec, Maine
- Coordinates: 44°51′42″N 66°59′6″W
- Area: 0.1 acres (0.040 ha)
- Built: 1818
- Architectural style: Federal
- NRHP reference No.: 07000009
- Added to NRHP: February 7, 2007

The Chaloner House is a historic house at 3 Pleasant Street in Lubec, Maine. It was built in stages ending around 1818, and is one of Lubec's relatively few Federal period buildings. It is also distinctive as an early example of a lodging house, a type of housing that is rare in eastern Maine. The house was listed on the National Register of Historic Places in 2007.

== Description and history ==
The Chaloner House is set on the west side of the northernmost block of Pleasant Street, near the northeastern tip of the Lubec peninsula. It is a 2 1/2-story wood-frame structure, eight bays wide, set on a sloping lot that provides a full basement level for the northernmost three bays. It has a saltbox profile, with its rear roofline sloping down to the first floor. The main facade is divided into two sections, the left five bays and the right three, based on its construction history. The left five bays have the entrance at their center, flanked by sidelight windows and pilasters, and topped by an entablature and cornice. The interior rooms at the front of house have retained a significant amount of Federal period styling, including woodwork and fireplaces, although many of latter have been blocked or had inserts placed in them.

When the property was purchased in 1817 by William Chaloner, there was almost certainly already a house standing on it; this was either a three-bay or five-bay structure, that may or may not have had the saltbox addition to the rear. Chaloner had eleven children by two wives between 1810 and 1835, and was likely responsible for enlarging the house he purchased to its present size. He also apparently took on lodgers: census figures for both 1820 and 1830 show a large number of males between 16 and 45 living in his house. Chaloner lost the house to a debt-related auction in 1834, and it has since served as a single- or multi-family residence since.

== See also ==
- National Register of Historic Places listings in Washington County, Maine
