= Jeremiah Fowler House =

Historic house in Maine, United States

- U.S. National Register of Historic Places
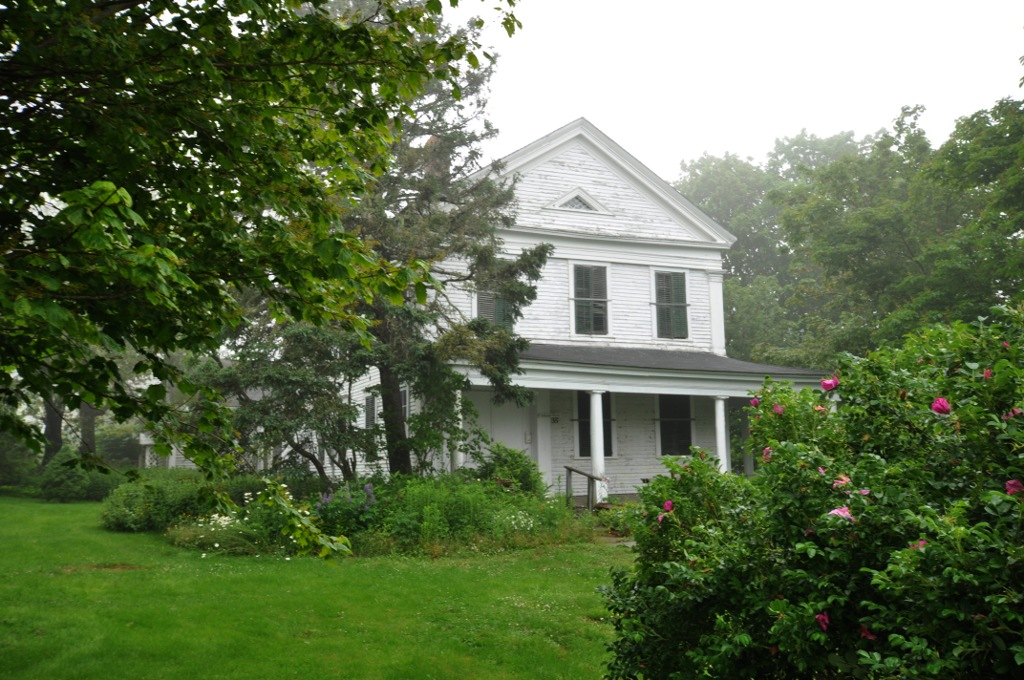

- Location within Maine Location within the United States
- Location: 35 School St., Lubec, Maine
- Coordinates: 44°51′37″N 66°59′14″W
- Area: 0.5 acres (0.20 ha)
- Built: 1840
- Architectural style: Greek Revival
- NRHP reference No.: 83003693
- Added to NRHP: December 29, 1983

The Jeremiah Fowler House is a historic house at 35 School Street in Lubec, Maine. Built about 1840, it is a fine local example of Greek Revival architecture, owned during the 19th century by locally prominent businessmen. The house was listed on the National Register of Historic Places in 1983.

== Description and history ==
The Fowler House is located on the north side of School Street, between Church Street and Pike Lane in a residential area of central Lubec. The house is a 2 1/2-story wood-frame structure, with a front-facing gable roof and clapboard siding. The south-facing facade is three bays wide, with pilasters at the corners and an entablature above. The entrance is in the left bay, flanked by pilasters and topped by an entablature. The main gable is fully pedimented, with a small triangular multi-pane window at its center. A c. 1900 Colonial Revival porch extends across the front and around to the side, supported by round columns. The interior of the house retains extensive period woodwork and other finishes, and has a particularly well-kept early 20th century bathroom with original fixtures.

The house was built about 1840 by Jeremiah Fowler, during a period of Lubec's growth as an industrial and shipbuilding center. Fowler, a merchant, sold the house in the 1850s to Simon Ryerson, the owner of a general store who later started a shipbuilding firm. The house was next owned by Ryerson's business partner, A. B. Sumner, a veteran of the American Civil War who married Ryerson's daughter.

== See also ==
- National Register of Historic Places listings in Washington County, Maine
