= Marsh Stream Farm =

Historic house in Maine, United States

- U.S. National Register of Historic Places
- U.S. Historic district
- Location within Maine Location within the United States
- Location: 38 Marsh Stream Ln., Machiasport, Maine
- Coordinates: 44°40′3″N 67°25′47″W
- Area: 213 acres (86 ha)
- Built: 1817
- Architectural style: Federal
- NRHP reference No.: 15000971
- Added to NRHP: January 12, 2016

Marsh Stream Farm is a historic coastal farm property at 38 Marsh Stream Lane in Machiasport, Maine. Established in 1817, the property was used for sheep farming, a once-common occupation in coastal Maine, until 1987. It has a well-preserved collection of 19th-century farm buildings, and was listed on the National Register of Historic Places in 2016.

== Description ==
Marsh Stream Farm is located in a rural area of central western Machiasport, on the south side of East Kennebec Road. The farm occupies more than 200 acres (81 ha) of land between that road and the eastern branch of the Little Kennebec Bay, bounded on the east by Manchester Lane and roughly on the west by Marsh Stream Lane. The main farm complex is set amid fields a short way south of East Kennebec Road, at the mouth of Marsh Stream. It includes a c. 1817 farmhouse, a 19th-century English barn, and a number of other 19th and 20th-century outbuildings. About 3/4 of the farm property is wooded, the remainder is maintained as pasture.

The main house, oriented facing south toward the stream and the bay, is a 1 1/2-story Cape style wood-frame structure, five bays wide, with a gabled roof, two small center chimneys, and clapboard siding. Each roof face has a gabled dormer. The original front door is framed by narrow pilasters and topped by a four-light transom window. Some of the interior rooms have retained significant original finishes from the period of construction.

Land for the farm was purchased in 1814 by William Holway, a native of Machias. By 1817 he had built the house, as well as a wharf and store (now only ruins remaining) on the bay. Holway raised sheep on the farm, a practice that would continue by following owners until 2003. The English barn, a well-preserved 19th-century structure, has modifications diverging from the typical form that are specific to the practice of sheep farming, and is an extremely rare example of this type of structure in Maine, which was once much more common.

== See also ==
- National Register of Historic Places listings in Washington County, Maine
