= McCurdy Smokehouse =

- U.S. National Register of Historic Places
- U.S. Historic district
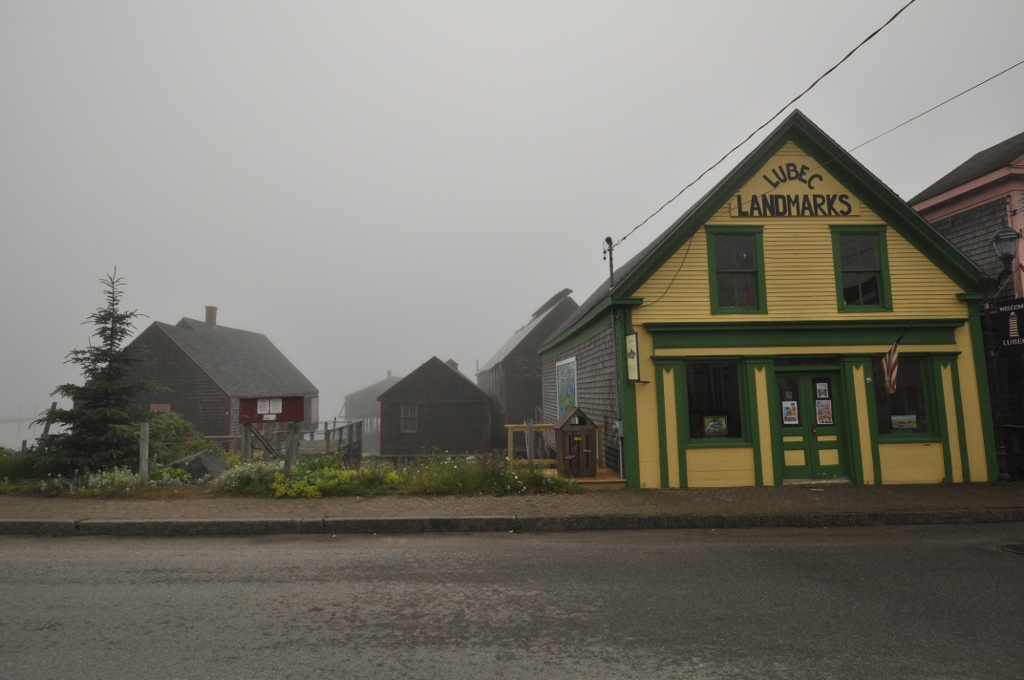

- Location within Maine Location within the United States
- Location: Water St., E side, at jct. with School St., Lubec, Maine
- Coordinates: 44°51′39″N 66°59′1″W
- Area: 1.2 acres (0.49 ha)
- Built: 1903
- NRHP reference No.: 93000638
- Added to NRHP: July 15, 1993

The McCurdy Smokehouse is a former industrial fish processing facility on the waterfront of Lubec, Maine. Operated between about 1906 and 1991, it is believed to be the last intact early 20th-century herring processing facility in the state. It is now owned by a local preservation group, hosts a museum and other facilities. The complex was listed on the National Register of Historic Places in 1993.

== Description and history ==
The McCurdy Smokehouse is set on a collection of adjacent pile wharves on the Lubec waterfront, near the junction of Water and School Streets. It is an assemblage of nine buildings, some purpose-built, some adapted to the purpose, which were mostly built between 1895 and 1941. All are wood frame structures, one and two stories in height. The oldest building is a c. 1860 Greek Revival retail building, which was adapted for use by the operators of the smokehouse as a warehouse sometime between 1921 and 1933.

The history of the smokehouse begins in 1907, when Robert McBridge purchased an unused wharf and built a smokehouse on it. He also acquired several adjacent buildings, that had previously housed other businesses, and adapted them for the specialized activities related to pickling and smoking herring. McBride's was one of thirteen herring smokehouses in Lubec, and the complex, expanded by his successors in the business, operated until 1991. From 1959 to 1995 the complex was owned by members of the McCurdy family. It was sold in 1995 to Lubec Landmarks, dedicated to its preservation. They have adapted the skinning/packing shed to house a museum on Lubec history, and are seeking adaptive uses for the other elements of the complex.

During the January 2018 North American blizzard, the facility's former brining shed collapsed. Portions of the structure were found across the Lubec Narrows on the shore of Campobello Island in Canada. Recovery of the remains is complicated in part by legal disputes over Canadian salvage rights.

== See also ==
- National Register of Historic Places listings in Washington County, Maine
