= Reversing Falls Park =

- Reversing Falls Site
- U.S. National Register of Historic Places
- Location within Maine Location within the United States
- Nearest city: Pembroke, Maine
- Coordinates: 44°52′57″N 67°7′57″W
- Area: 0.5 acres (0.20 ha)
- MPS: Cobscook Area Coastal Prehistoric Sites MPS
- NRHP reference No.: 90000907
- Added to NRHP: June 27, 1990

Reversing Falls Park is a municipal park in Pembroke, Maine. It is located at Mahar Point, the northern point of a narrows separating Dennys Bay from Cobscook Bay in far eastern Maine. The narrows are subject to a reversal of current twice a day, owing to the area's unusually high tides. In addition to viewing this action, the park is also well suited for wildlife viewing.

The area in the park vicinity is also archaeologically sensitive, as the site of Native American settlements in the area's prehistory. It was listed on the National Register of Historic Places in 1990.

An article about this park was published in Alamo Sierran January 2026 (Sierra Club Lone Star chapter San Antonio group) . A small island is visible at low tides, at most only small waves likely visible at high tides. The pictures below at low and high tides looking east-southeast were taken from Mahar Point, Reversing Falls Park, Pembroke; the large island behind is Falls Island, Nature Conservancy. The park is part of the larger Reversing Falls Preserve; here is a map and brochure from Downeast Coastal Conservancy which maintains the preserve. And conservancy's trails map about the surrounding large area.

The island at low tide is upper center.

The submerged island at high tide is upper center with little waves surrounding.

== See also ==
- National Register of Historic Places listings in Washington County, Maine
