= Machias Valley Grange, No. 360 =

- Machias Valley Grange, #360 (Former)
- U.S. National Register of Historic Places
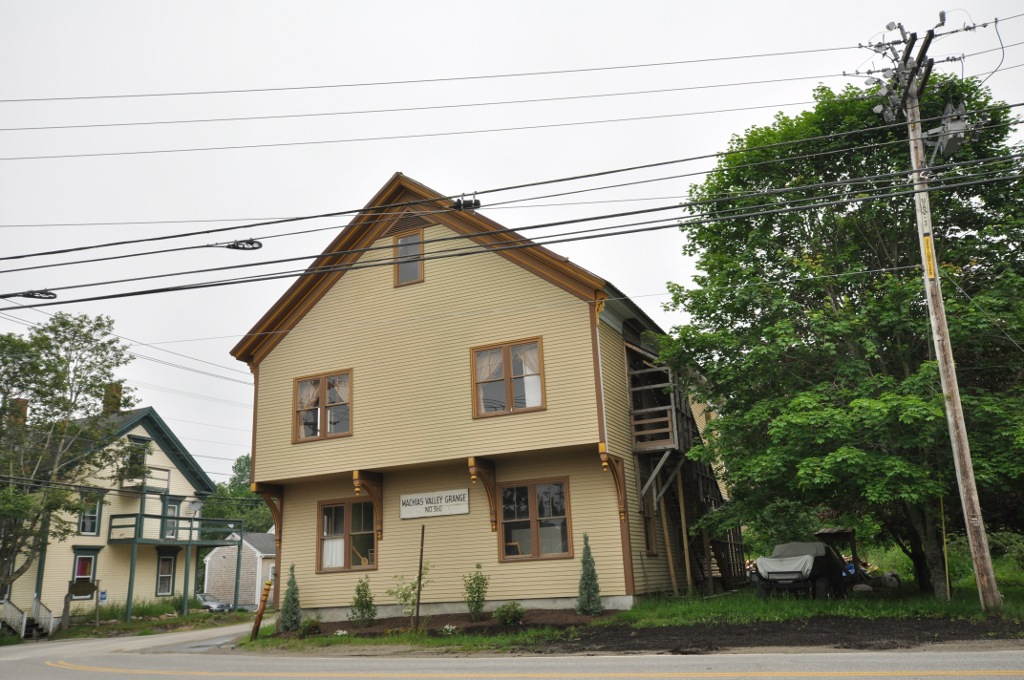

- Location within Maine Location within the United States
- Location: 1 Elm St., Machias, Maine
- Coordinates: 44°42′47″N 67°27′27″W
- Area: 0.2 acres (0.081 ha)
- Built: 1907
- Architectural style: Queen Anne
- NRHP reference No.: 07000410
- Added to NRHP: May 8, 2007

The Former Machias Valley Grange, No. 360 is a social and civic meeting hall at 1 Elm Street in Machias, Maine. Built in 1907, it features a distinctive design that eliminates support posts in its dining hall and auditorium. Now owned by a local artists' cooperative, it continues to function as a social and civic meeting space. It was listed on the National Register of Historic Places in 2007.

== Description and history ==
The former Machias Grange hall is set on the south side of the Machias River, opposite the town's downtown area, at the junction of Obrien and Elm Streets. It is a 2 1/2-story wood-frame structure, with a gabled roof, clapboard siding, and concrete foundation. Its main entrance is set at the eastern end of the long side facing Elm Street, under a hip-roofed portico supported by turned posts. The facade facing Obrien Street is distinguished by a deeply overhanging second story, with the overhang supported by large Queen Anne-inspired brackets. There are two pairs of sash windows on each of the main floors on this facade, and a single sash window at the attic level.

The main entrance opens into a foyer area that extends along the east side of the building, with stairs leading to the auditorium upstairs, and doors leading to the dining area that occupies most of the downstairs. The kitchen occupies the northeastern corner. The upstairs auditorium has a simple raised platform stage (with no backstage area) at the far end. The dining room ceiling is supported by a combination of heavy wooden timbers, with metal rods oriented laterally to them, eliminating the need for supporting pillars. A similar support system is also used in the ceiling of the auditorium, but it is obscured by a suspended tin ceiling.

The Machias Grange was organized in 1903, and met in the town's Pennell Block until it built this structure in 1907. Records of the period have not survived, so the building's architect is not known. Because of the building's sizable dining room and kitchen, it quickly became an important local venue for social and fraternal events, dances, and religious services. When the town's last movie theater closed, the Grange also screened films here. With the Grange's membership in decline, the building was sold in 2001 to the Beehive Cooperative, an artists' cooperative, which has restored the building and continues to offer it as a social and community meeting space.

== See also ==
- National Register of Historic Places listings in Washington County, Maine
