= Whitneyville Congregational Church (Whitneyville, Maine) =

Historic church in Maine, United States

- U.S. National Register of Historic Places
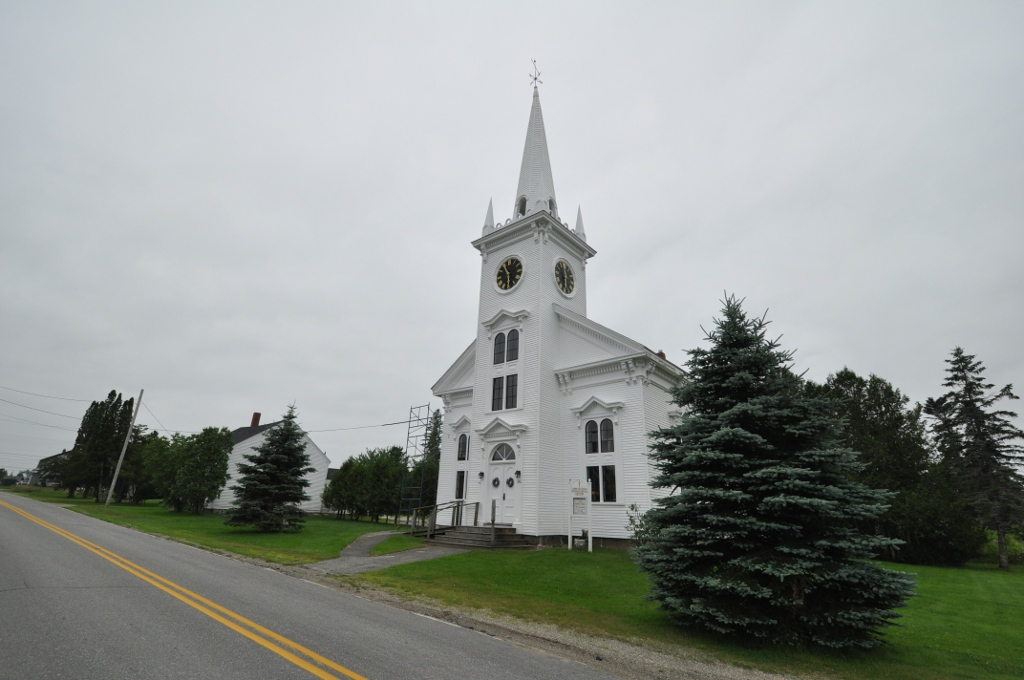

- Location within Maine Location within the United States
- Location: Main St., Whitneyville, Maine
- Coordinates: 44°43′20″N 67°29′58″W
- Area: 0.5 acres (0.20 ha)
- Built: 1869
- Architect: Bowker, William
- Architectural style: Italianate
- NRHP reference No.: 79000170
- Added to NRHP: June 26, 1979

Whitneyville Congregational Church is a historic church on Main Street in Whitneyville, Maine. Built 1869-76, it is an unusually high-style Italianate building for a remote rural setting. It was listed on the National Register of Historic Places in 1979.

== Description and history ==
The Whitneyville Congregational Church is located in the rural village center of Whitneyville, at the southwest corner of Washington and Main Streets (the latter marked United States Route 1A). It is an architecturally sophisticated single story wood frame structure, with a gabled roof, clapboarded exterior, and granite stone foundation. The main facade is three bays wide, with the church tower rising from the projecting center bay. At its base is the main entrance, framed by pilasters and a bracketed and dentillated hood, with a half-round transom window above the door. The second level has a four-part window, left and right halves each with rounded tops, set in a similarly decorated surround. A clock is mounted in the tower above the ridge line, and is capped by a bracketed cornice, pinnacles at the corners, and central spire with weathervane. Windows that flank the tower have similar styling to that on the tower.

The Church Building Society was formed in 1866 to oversee the construction of a church in Whitneyville. Its extensive records survive, describing construction of the building between 1869 and 1876, including financial difficulties in funding that work, and recording the sale of pews in its support. The church was built by William Bowker, a local master builder, and was probably influenced by design pattern books of the period.

== See also ==
- National Register of Historic Places listings in Washington County, Maine
