= Pike's Mile Markers =

Mileposts in Maine, United States

- U.S. National Register of Historic Places
- U.S. Historic district
- Location within Maine Location within the United States
- Nearest city: Calais, Maine
- Area: less than one acre
- Built: 1866
- NRHP reference No.: 94001548
- Added to NRHP: January 20, 1995

Pike's Mile Markers are a series of twelve stone mileposts along United States Route 1 in Robbinston and Calais in far eastern Washington County, Maine. The stones were placed by James Shepherd Pike, owner of The Mansion House which stands near the 12-mile mark. The measure the distance from his house to the center of Calais, and were supposedly used by Pike to assess the quality of his horses. The markers, unique in the state of Maine, were listed on the National Register of Historic Places in 1995.

== History ==
James Shepherd Pike (1811–82) was born in Calais, and achieved a nationwide reputation as a journalist with a strong anti-slavery voice prior to the American Civil War. During the war he served as United States Ambassador to the Netherlands. Upon his return from that posting, he purchased the Mansion House, a large Federal-style mansion in Robbinston, where he lived in semi-retirement. He continued to write on subjects related to African-American civil rights, but became bitterly opposed to the corruption and mismanagement of the Reconstruction Era.

Pike is said to have carefully measured the route from his house to Calais, and then placed these stones sometime between his purchase of the Mansion House and his death in 1882. He is also said to have used them as a means to gauge the performance of his horses.

== List of markers ==
There are twelve markers in all, of which eleven are those originally placed by Pike. Marker #6 was destroyed during road works on US 1 shortly after World War II, and was replaced by a similar marker fashioned out of red granite; Pike's original markers are all gray granite, with inscriptions painted in red on a white background. All of the markers are located on the east side of US 1.

Miles to Calais	Image	Location	Town	Notes
12		In front of the Redclyffe Shore Motel; 45.084676°N 67.111364°W	Robbinston	Near the northern drive entrance; rectangular with flat top
11		US 1; 45.09342°N 67.124089°W	Robbinston	Irregular rectangle, with damaged top
10		US 1; 45.104127°N 67.134797°W	Robbinston	Irregular rectangle, with damaged top
9		US 1; 45.117163°N 67.144797°W	Calais	Irregular rectangle, with damaged top
8		US 1; 45.130066°N 67.152263°W	Calais	Rectangle, with a flat top, damaged at one corner
7		US 1; 45.143212°N 67.164904°W	Calais	Rectangular, with rounded top
6		Southeast corner of US 1 and Old River Rd. 45.154771°N 67.176971°W	Calais	Rectangular, with flat top
5		US 1, opposite house #759; 45.162130°N 67.195853°W	Calais	Rectangular, with flat top
4		US 1; 45.164562°N 67.216354°W	Calais	Rectangular, with flat top
3		US 1 at Downeast Hub; 45.161716°N 67.232960°W	Calais	Taller, with flat top
2		US 1; 45.170892°N 67.246641°W	Calais	Rectangular, with angled top
1		Opposite Calais UMC on US 1; 45.181580°N 67.260783°W	Calais	Taller, with flat top

== See also ==
- National Register of Historic Places listings in Washington County, Maine
