= Robert Siegel (disambiguation) =

Robert Siegel (born 1947) is an American radio journalist, former host of NPR's All Things Considered

Robert Siegel may also refer to:

- Robert Siegel (filmmaker) (born 1971), American screenwriter and film director
- Robert Anthony Siegel, American novelist and professor
- Robert Siegel (author) (1939–2012), American novelist and poet
- Robert T. Siegel (1928–2000), American physicist
- Robert A. Siegel (1913–1993), American philatelic auctioneer
- Robert E. Siegel, American venture capitalist and faculty member at Stanford University
- Robert Siegel, American architect of Robert Siegel Architects
- Robert H. Siegel, American architect of Gwathmey Siegel & Associates Architects

== See also ==
- Robert Sigl (born 1962), German filmmaker
