= Calais Residential Historic District =

Historic district in Maine, United States

- U.S. National Register of Historic Places
- U.S. Historic district
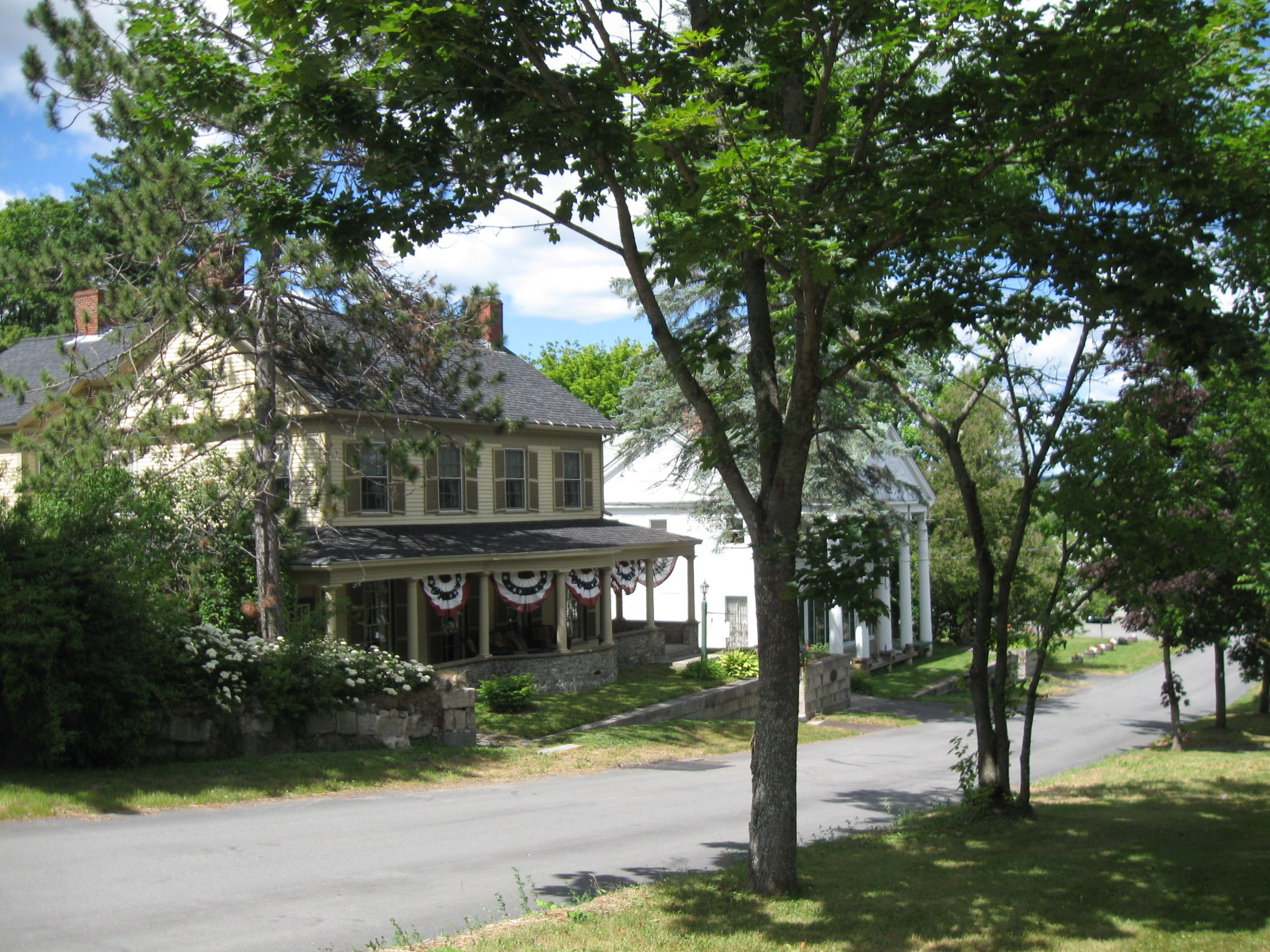

- Location within Maine Location within the United States
- Location: Roughly, area along Main St. and Calais Ave., from Calais Ave. to Swan St., Calais, Maine
- Coordinates: 45°11′11″N 67°16′25″W
- Area: 15 acres (6.1 ha)
- Built: 1830
- Built by: Asher B. Bassford
- Architectural style: Greek Revival, Italianate, Queen Anne
- NRHP reference No.: 94001248
- Added to NRHP: October 28, 1994

The Calais Residential Historic District encompasses the town's best collection of well-preserved 19th-century residences in Calais, Maine. Located on Calais Avenue and Main Street, the district includes twenty properties developed between the early 19th century and 1900. It was listed on the National Register of Historic Places in 1994.

== Description and history ==
The town of Calais, Maine is located in Down East Maine, just across the Saint Croix River from Saint Stephen, New Brunswick. The 19th century was a period of significant growth and development as a lumber processing center, with shipbuilding also an important industry in the first half of the century. Main Street was laid out running roughly northwest-to-southeast along the river bank, and Calais Avenue developed as a residential street running southwest from Main Street. Calais Avenue is notable for its wide grassy median, and it was at the junction of the two streets that the first Congregational Church was built in 1826. (It was later moved, and the 1873 building that replaced it is now a community center.

The historic district includes three blocks on the south side of Main Street east of Calais Avenue, and two blocks on both sides of Calais Avenue. The oldest house in the district, dating to the Federal period, is the Holmes Cottage. Built sometime before 1831, it is a modest 1-1/2 story cottage with a long history of association with Calais' doctors. Now owned by the local historical society, it stands on Main Street next to the 1850 Dr. Job Holmes House, one of the town's finest Italianate houses. The Greek Revival is the most common architectural style found in the district, and there are only three houses built after 1880. There are two church buildings in the district, including the 1833 United Methodist Church, the oldest religious building in the town. The only (formerly) commercial structure in the district is a small 1835 hotel, the first brick hotel building to be built east of Bangor.

== See also ==
- Calais Historic District, encompassing commercial properties
- National Register of Historic Places listings in Washington County, Maine
