= John N.M. Brewer House =

Historic house in Maine, United States

- U.S. National Register of Historic Places
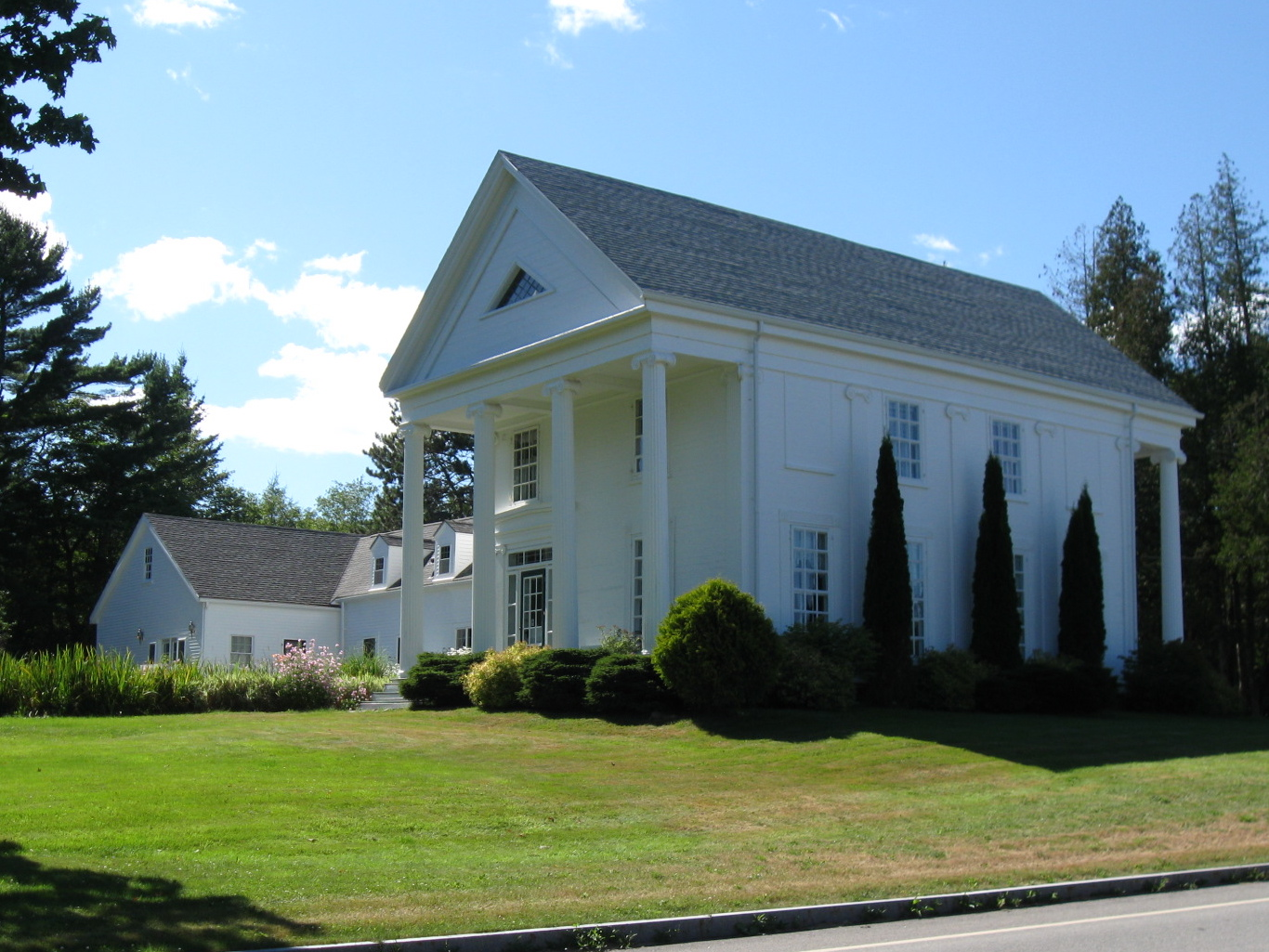

- Location within Maine Location within the United States
- Location: US 1, Robbinston, Maine
- Coordinates: 45°4′55″N 67°6′40″W
- Area: 0.5 acres (0.20 ha)
- Built: 1828
- Architectural style: Greek Revival, Ionic
- NRHP reference No.: 83003690
- Added to NRHP: October 6, 1983

The John N.M. Brewer House is a historic house on United States Route 1 in Robbinston, Maine, United States. Built in late 1820s, it is the only known example of an amphiprostyle Greek temple residence (that is, with colonnaded temple fronts both front and back) in eastern Maine. It was built by a prominent local shipbuilder and sea captain. The house was listed on the National Register of Historic Places in 1983.

== Description and history ==
The Brewer House is set on the west side of US Route 1. It is a two-story wood-frame structure, with a front-facing gable roof. Its front and rear facades both have projecting gable ends supported by five large two-story Ionic columns, with similar pilasters at the wall behind. The walls at the backs of these colonnades are flushboarded, as are the gable pediments, which sport a triangular window in the center. The eastern facade is clapboarded, with pilasters separating the bays. A pair of ells extend the main block to the west.

The house was built c. 1828-30 by John Nehemiah Marks Brewer, a prominent local shipbuilder and ship's captain. Brewer's father was a local militia commander during the War of 1812, and built The Mansion House, another prominent local residence. Brewer also later built the Henrietta Brewer House (located a short way up the road) for his wife. This house was used as a school for many years after Brewer's death in 1857, but is now in private hands. It is the only known example of its style east of the Penobscot River.

== See also ==
- National Register of Historic Places listings in Washington County, Maine
