= Joshua Pettegrove House =

Historic house in the Red Beach area of Calais, Maine, United States

- U.S. National Register of Historic Places
- U.S. Historic district
- Location within Maine Location within the United States
- Location: St. Croix Dr., Red Beach, Calais, Maine
- Coordinates: 45°7′32″N 67°8′47″W
- Area: 5 acres (2.0 ha)
- Built: 1854
- Architectural style: Gothic Revival, Downingesque
- NRHP reference No.: 94000179
- Added to NRHP: March 17, 1994

The Joshua Pettegrove House is a historic house on St. Croix Drive in the Red Beach area of Calais, Maine. Built about 1854, it is one of a number of high-quality Gothic Revival houses in the region, The house was listed on the National Register of Historic Places in 1994.

== Description and history ==
The Joshua Pettegrove House is located in far southern Calais, on a 5-acre (2.0 ha) parcel of mostly wooded land called Pettegrove Point, which juts into the St. Croix River just north of the land portion of the Saint Croix Island International Historic Site. The house shares a long drive off St. Croix Drive with the adjacent McGlashan-Nickerson House, which is part of the National Park Service property associated with the historic site. The Pettegrove House is a 1 3/4-story wood-frame structure, with a T-shaped plan topped by a steeply pitched gable roof, and an exterior that is a combination of clapboards, and flushboard siding. Its primary facade faces west, and includes the gable end of the main block, and a pair of telescoping ells that project to the north. The main block is three bays wide, the gable end decorated with jigsawn vergeboard. The main entrance is set in the leftmost bay, with tall windows in the other two. On the second level, a pair of sash windows are flanked by smaller lancet-arched windows, and there is a small trefoil window just below the gable peak. The first ell has a pair of gabled dormers, each decorated with vergeboard and topped by a finial. The south elevation, which faces a view of the river cut through the trees, has a single-story hip-roofed porch extending across it. The property also includes a period carriage barn.

The house and carriage barn were built about 1854, by one of two owners who owned it in rapid succession. Edward Burgin, the later of the two, sold the property, "with cottage and stable", to Joshua Pettegrove, an immigrant from New Brunswick, in 1854. The architect of the building is unknown, and the property is one of a handful of well-preserved Gothic Revival houses in Calais and neighboring Robbinston.

== See also ==
- National Register of Historic Places listings in Washington County, Maine
