= Hiram Grant =

Hiram Grant may refer to:

- Ulysses S. Grant (Hiram Ulysses Grant, 1822–1885), 18th president of the United States
- Hiram L. Grant (1843–1922), American military officer, businessman, and politician
- Hiram P. Grant (1828–1897), Saint Paul firefighter and Minnesota military officer
