= The Mansion House (Robbinston, Maine) =

Historic house in Maine, United States

- U.S. National Register of Historic Places
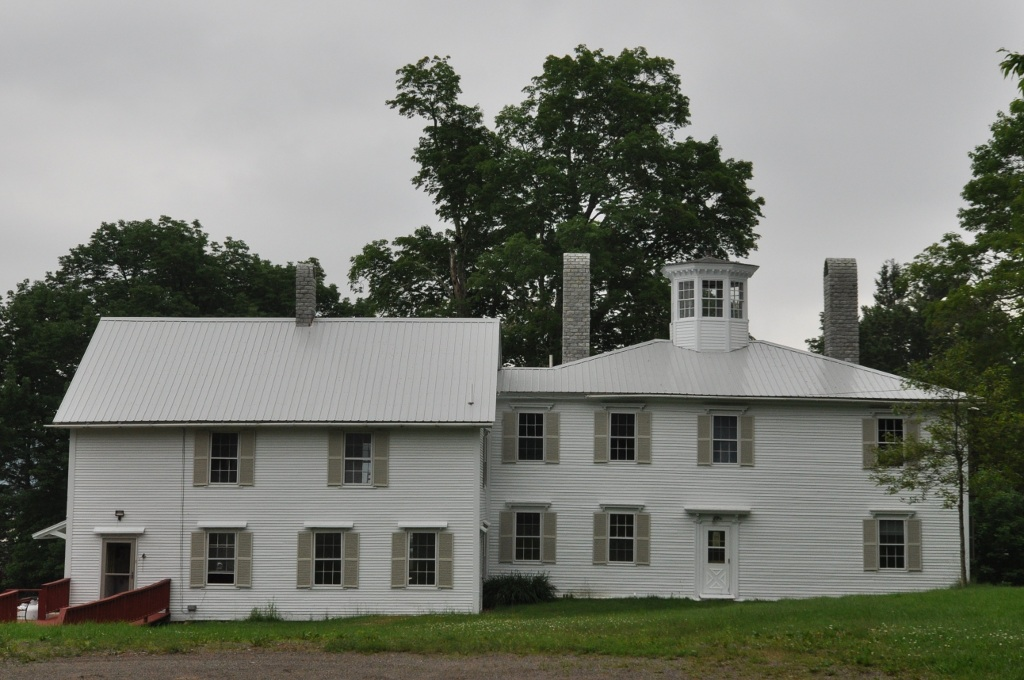
- View of the front

- Location within Maine Location within the United States
- Nearest city: Robbinston, Maine
- Coordinates: 45°5′10″N 67°6′43.5″W
- Area: 1 acre (0.40 ha)
- Built: 1785
- Built by: John Brewer
- NRHP reference No.: 73000154
- Added to NRHP: May 22, 1973

The Mansion House is a historic house on United States Route 1 in Robbinston, Maine. Built about 1785, it is a fine Federal period mansion, historically associated with John Brewer, a leading shipbuilder and militia leader during the War of 1812, and James Shepherd Pike, a journalist who also served during the American Civil War as United States Ambassador to the Netherlands. The house was listed on the National Register of Historic Places in 1973.

== Description and history ==
The Mansion House stands between United States Route 1 and the St. Croix River in far eastern Maine. It stands just north of the Henrietta Brewer House (now the Redclyffe Shore Motel), on a mostly-wooded parcel of more than 10 acres (4.0 ha). The house is a large two-story wood-frame structure, with a roughly square main section, from which a rectangular ell extends from its northern corner. The house is oriented with its main facade facing southeast, toward the river. That facade is five bays wide, with an open single-story piazza extending across the center three bays, supported by round columns, and steps descending to the ground across its width and sides. The main entrance is flanked by sidelight windows and topped by a Federal style fanlight window, into which the date "1785" has been etched. The interior of the house retains elegant Federal period finishes, including two staircases, fireplace mantels, and wooden wainscoting, which on the ground floor consists of single planks of pine, 30 inches (76 cm) in width.

The house was built in 1785 by John Brewer, a prominent local shipbuilder, who also served as the local postmaster. Brewer worked closely in business with partners across the river in New Brunswick, and served as a general in the state militia during the War of 1812. It is said that the cupola on this house was used during that conflict as a lookout point for the arrival military forces. James Shepherd Pike, who acquired the house in 1864 as a summer residence, was the son of a business partner of John Brewer's sun John N. M. Brewer. Pike, a journalist by trade, was notable as a prominent anti-slavery advocate on the pages of the New York Tribune and other newspapers. During the American Civil War he served as United States Ambassador to the Netherlands, appointed by President Abraham Lincoln. In the post-war years he is known to have hosted several luminaries of the period here, including Salmon P. Chase and Horace Greeley. The house has since been winterized for year-round use, and remains in private hands.

== See also ==
- National Register of Historic Places listings in Washington County, Maine
