= The Prostrate State =

1873 non-fiction book by James Shepherd Pike

- Author: James Shepherd Pike
- Language: English
- Publisher: D. Appleton and Company
- Publication date: 1873

The Prostrate State: South Carolina under Negro Government is a book critical of the Reconstruction era, black legislators, and Ulysses S. Grant written by James Shepherd Pike in 1873. It alleges widespread corruption and misrule during the period.

In 1873 James Shepherd Pike toured South Carolina and wrote a series of newspaper articles, reprinted in newspapers across the country and republished in book form in 1874 as The Prostrate State: South Carolina under Negro Government. During February and March, Pike closely observed the South Carolina General Assembly in Columbia, the sessions of which he described as a "huge system of brigandage". It was a widely read and highly influential first hand account of the details of Reconstruction government in South Carolina, that systematically exposed what Pike considered to be corruption, incompetence, bribery, financial misdeeds and misbehavior in the state legislature. His critics argued that the tone and emphasis was distorted and hostile toward African Americans and Grant Republicans.

The Prostrate State painted a lurid picture of corruption. Historian Eric Foner writes:

The book depicted a state engulfed by political corruption, drained by governmental extravagance, and under the control of "a mass of black barbarism." The South's problems, he insisted, arose from "Negro government." The solution was to restore leading whites to political power.

Historian John Hope Franklin said that, while the book was once seen as authoritative, it "should perhaps not be classified as history at all," given the research of Robert Franklin Durden, which showed that, by "picking and choosing from his notes those events and incidents that supported his argument," Pike "sought to place responsibility for the failure of Reconstruction on the Grant administration and on the freedmen, whom he despised with equal passion." Durden, observing that Pike's radical opposition to slavery was moved in large part by racial animus against the slaves themselves, had found that Pike's book cherry-picked anecdotes supporting that bias and that Pike either confined his factfinding to conservative white sources or simply ignored evidence, which the notes from his work in South Carolina contained, that would have undermined his thesis.

Historian Mark W. Summers, by contrast, concluded that, "however maliciously and mendaciously he [Pike] shaded his evidence, his accounts squared with those of his colleagues Charles Nordhoff of the New York Herald and H. V. Redfield of the Cincinnati Commercial. James Freeman Clarke, a leading Boston abolitionist, visited South Carolina and reported back to his Boston congregation that the facts presented by Pike, "were confirmed by every man whom I saw."
