= McGlashan-Nickerson House =

Historic house in Maine, United States

- U.S. National Register of Historic Places
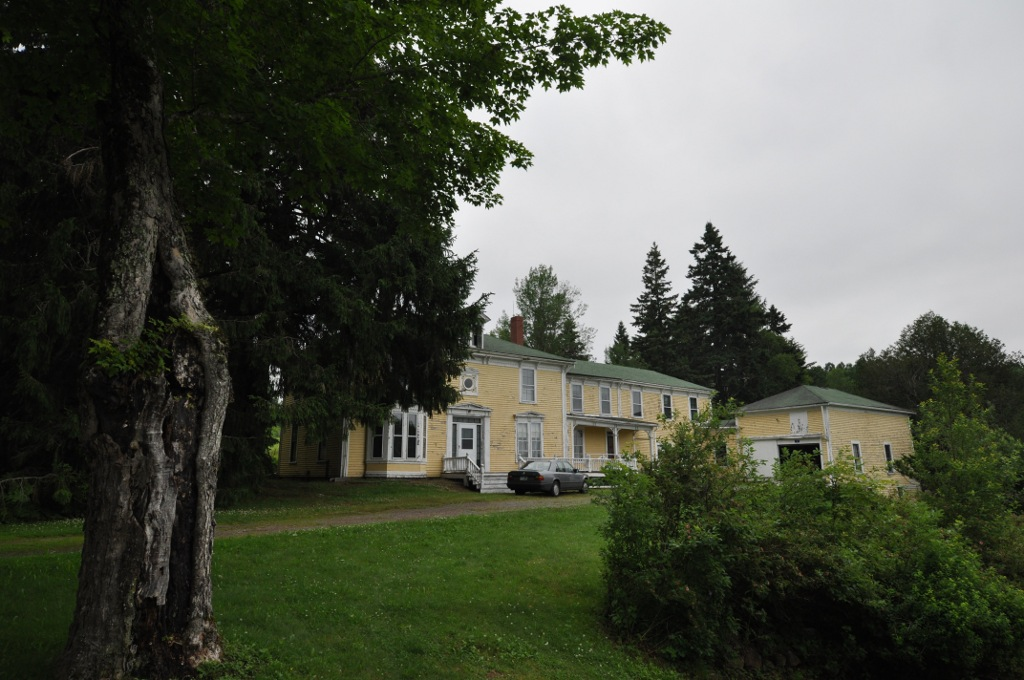

- Location within Maine Location within the United States
- Location: St. Croix Dr. near Pettegrove Pt., Red Beach, Maine
- Coordinates: 45°7′30″N 67°8′54″W
- Area: 5.5 acres (2.2 ha)
- Built: 1883
- Architectural style: Italianate
- NRHP reference No.: 90000920
- Added to NRHP: June 14, 1990

The McGlashan-Nickerson House is a historic house on St. Croix Drive in the village of Red Beach, part of Calais, Maine. Built about 1883, it is a fine example of Italianate architecture, built for one of the principals of the Maine Red Granite Quarry Company. It was listed on the National Register of Historic Places in 1990. It is now owned by the National Park Service, housing facilities that support operation of the adjacent St. Croix Island International Historic Site.

== Description and history ==
The McGlashan-Nickerson House is located in southern Calais, set on a rise overlooking Red Beach Cove, an indentation of the tidal St. Croix River. Abutting to the south is the publicly accessible land portion of the St. Croix Island International Historic Site. The property is bisected by a right of way listed in book 617 page 47 and book 1406 page 245 which connects Joshua Pettegrove House to old Route 1. The McGlashan House is a rambling 2 1/2-story wood-frame structure, its rectangular main block capped by a hip roof and finished in clapboard siding. A long two-story ell extends eastward, joining it to a carriage house. The main block is three bays wide, with an elaborate center entrance that has sidelight and transom windows, and pilasters supporting and an entablature with a shallow gable. To its left is a single-story projecting window bay. The building's cornices are bracketed, and there is a porch extending along part of the ell, supported by bracketed chamfered posts.

The house was built about 1883 for George McGlashan, a Scottish immigrant who was a part owner of the Maine Red Granite Quarry Company. This company was one of two industrial concerns that operated on Red Beach Cove, neither of whose buildings have survived. McGlashan died in 1888, and his widow sold the house to Samuel Nickerson, whose family owned the property until 1985. It is now owned by the National Park Service, and provides housing and other support facilities for the adjacent historic site.

As of August 2025, the house is in need of general maintenance and repairs. It is not in service at the present time while awaiting funding to restore the house. The park owns the adjacent house which is used for staff.

== See also ==
- National Register of Historic Places listings in Washington County, Maine
