= St. Ann's Episcopal Church (Richford, Vermont) =

Historic church in Vermont, United States

- U.S. National Register of Historic Places
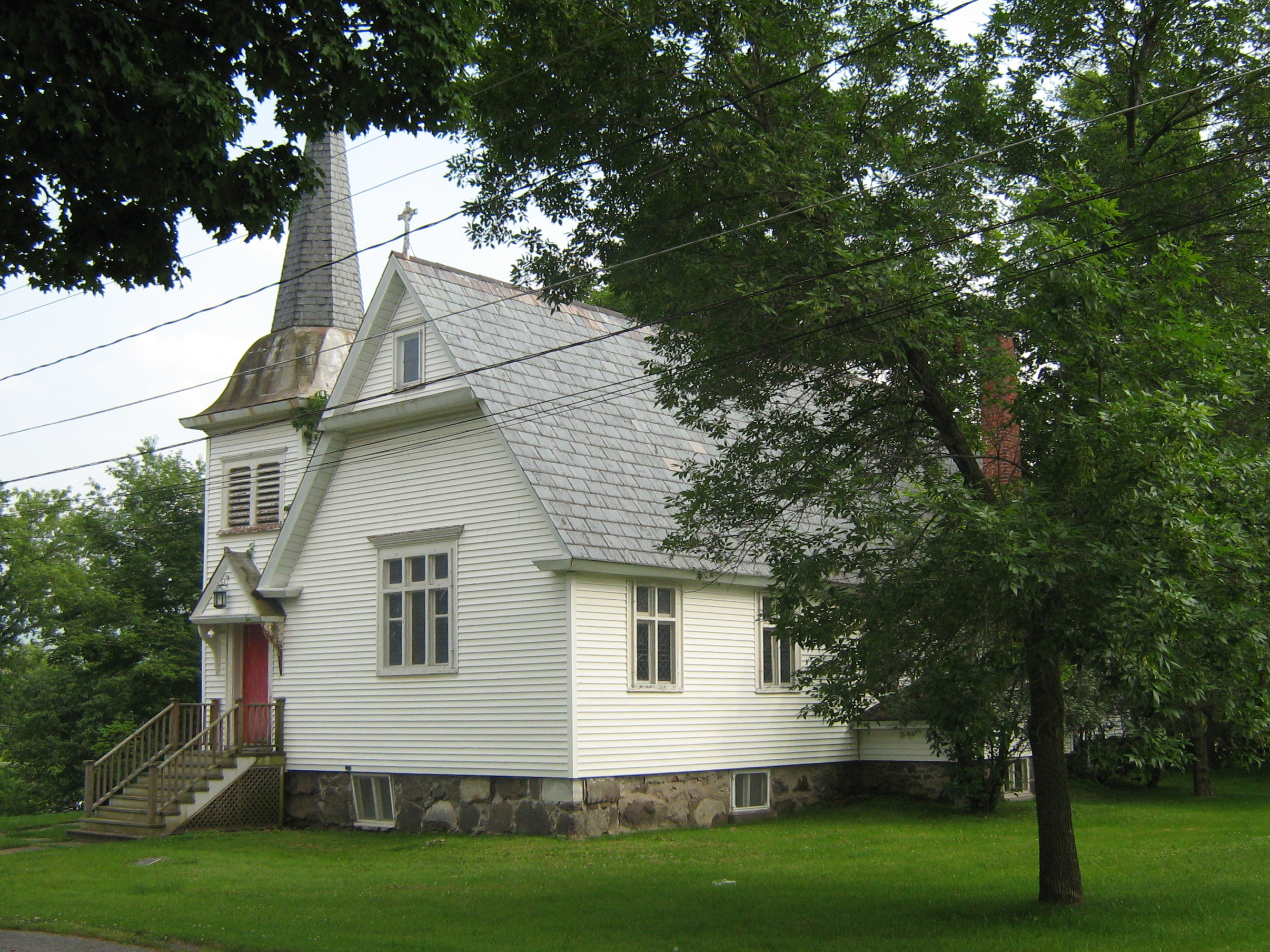
- Front of the church

- Location within Vermont Location within the United States
- Location: Jct. of Church and Town Sts., Richford, Vermont
- Coordinates: 44°59′52″N 72°40′20″W
- Area: 0.5 acres (0.20 ha)
- Built: 1883
- Architectural style: Queen Anne
- MPS: Religious Buildings, Sites and Structures in Vermont MPS
- NRHP reference No.: 01000259
- Added to NRHP: March 12, 2001

St. Ann's Episcopal Church is an historic Episcopal church located on Church Street in Richford, Vermont, in the United States. Built in 1883, it is an architecturally a distinctive blend of Queen Anne and Gothic Revival architecture. On March 12, 2001, it was added to the National Register of Historic Places. The church is a defunct mission of the Episcopal Diocese of Vermont; no services are held there.

== Architecture and history ==
St. Ann's stands one block north of Richford's small business district, at the southwest corner of Church and Town Streets. It was originally built facing Town Street (then known as High Street), but was rotated ninety degrees in 1903 to its present siting. It is a narrow rectangular wood-frame structure, with a steeply pitched gable roof and stone foundation. The exterior is finished in non-original vinyl siding. The main entrance is in a square tower that projects from the northeastern corner, rising through a belfry to a bellcast roof and steeple. The interior of the church is where its Gothic features are found. The walls and floors are finished in smoky buttered tongue-and-groove wooden boards, with the roof supported by five large Gothic-arched trusses. A large stained-glass window adorns the south wall at the back of the sacristy.

The church was built in 1883 by the Episcopal Diocese of Vermont, its leaders having noted that the town lacked a significant religious presence, with two other denominations having been unsuccessful in starting congregations. The church was consecrated in 1894, following the Episcopalian practice of not doing so until the debts for its construction had been paid off. The church prospered along with the town through the First World War, but began a gradual decline thereafter. The building has been leased by the diocese to the local historical society, which is undertaking its restoration.

== See also ==
- National Register of Historic Places listings in Franklin County, Vermont
- St. Anne's Episcopal Church (disambiguation)
