= Edwin Grant Dexter =

American educator (1868–1938)

Edwin Grant Dexter (1868-1938) was an American educator, born at Calais, Maine. He graduated in 1891 from Brown University, where he taught for a year and then (between 1892 and 1899) was science master of Colorado Springs High School, director of the Colorado Springs Summer School of Science, Philosophy, and Languages, and professor of psychology in the Normal School at Greeley, Colo. In 1899 he gained a Ph.D. at Columbia University and the higher diploma of Teachers College. From then until 1907 he served at the University of Illinois in various capacities — as professor of pedagogy and psychology, director of the summer term, director of the School of Education, and dean. He became commissioner of education in Puerto Rico and chancellor of the University of Puerto Rico in 1907. He was president of the National Society for the Scientific Study of Education in 1905-06 and president of the child-study section of the National Education Association in 1905-07. Besides serving as associate editor of the Internationales Archivar für Schulhygiene and of the Jahrschrift für Körpeliche Erziehung and contributing some 50 articles to scientific and educational journals, he was author of:

- A History of Education in the United States. New York: Macmillan. 1904 – via HathiTrust.
- Weather Influences. New York: Macmillan. 1904 – via Internet Archive.
