= St. Anne's Episcopal Church (Calais, Maine) =

Historic church in Maine, United States

- U.S. National Register of Historic Places
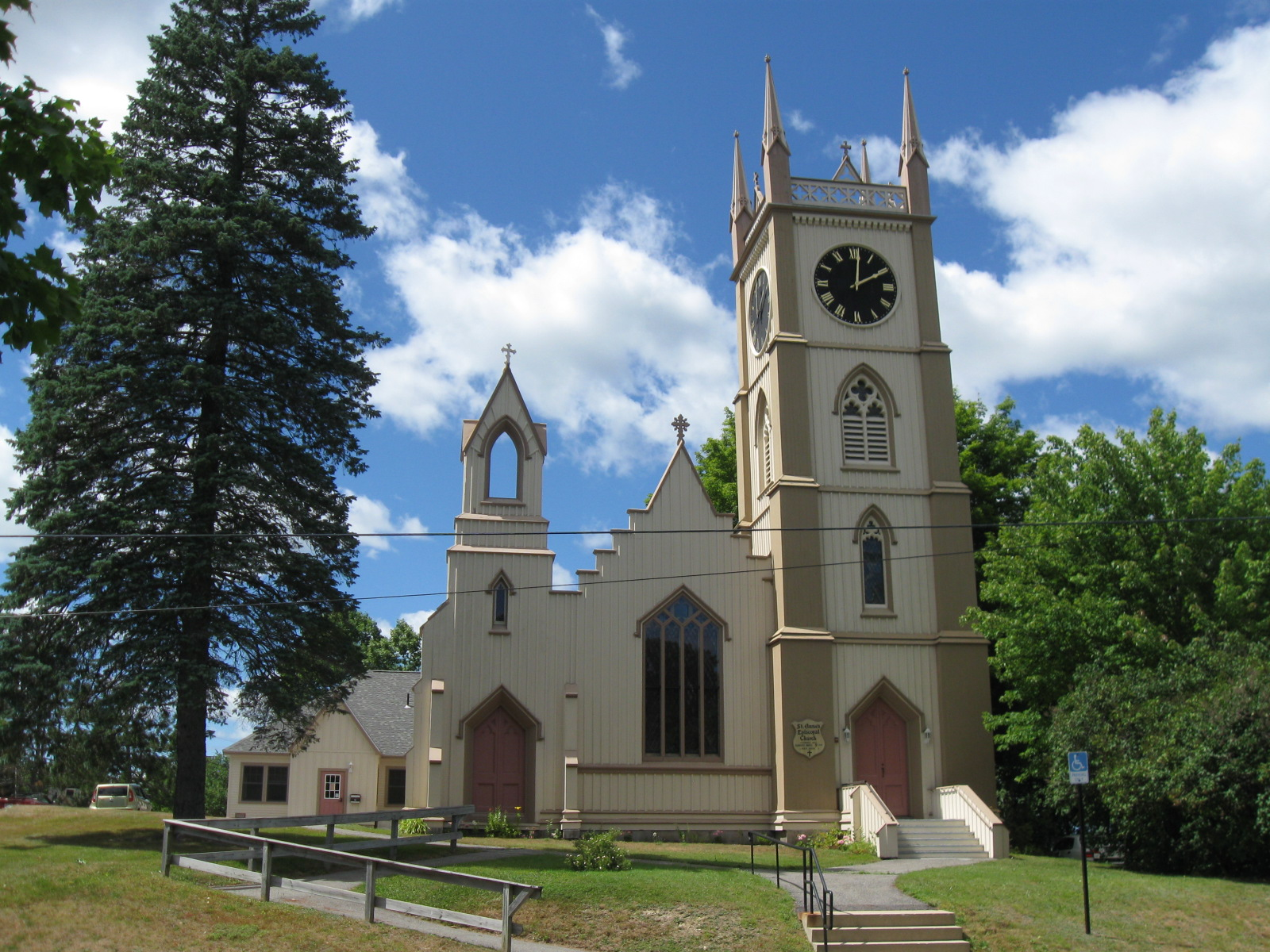

- Location within Maine Location within the United States
- Location: 29 Church Street; Calais, Maine
- Coordinates: 45.18729°N 67.27796°W
- Area: 0.5 acres (0.20 ha)
- Built: 1853
- Architect: James Renwick Jr.
- Architectural style: Carpenter Gothic
- NRHP reference No.: 82000789
- Added to NRHP: July 8, 1982

St. Anne's Episcopal Church is a historic church at 29 Church Street in Calais, Maine. Built in 1853, it is a locally distinctive example of Carpenter Gothic architecture, and is the only known statewide work of architect James Renwick Jr. The church building was listed on the National Register of Historic Places in 1982. It is a member of the Episcopal Diocese of Maine; its pastor is the Rev. Sara Gavit. The church reported 92 members in 2018 and 80 members in 2023; no membership statistics were reported in 2024 parochial reports. Plate and pledge income reported for the congregation in 2024 was $100,667. Average Sunday attendance (ASA) in 2024 was 26 persons.

== Description and history ==
St. Anne's is located in central Calais, at the northern corner of Church and Washington Streets. It is a single-story wood-frame structure, with a gable roof, board-and-batten siding, and a granite foundation. Its front facade, facing Church Street, has a buttressed four-stage tower to the right of the gable, and a smaller two-stage tower with open belfry on the left. The right tower houses the main entrance on the first level, a narrow lancet window on the second, the main belfry with louvered lancet openings on the third, and a large clock on the fourth; it is topped by a low jigsawn balustrade with corner pinnacles. The main gable, which has a stepped front, has a four-part stained-glass window with tracery at its center.

The church was built in 1853 to a design by James Renwick Jr. Best known for St. Patrick's Cathedral, New York (built 1858–73), Renwick was in 1853 overseeing construction of the Smithsonian Institution Building. This church is his only known Maine commission.

== See also ==
- National Register of Historic Places listings in Washington County, Maine
- St. Anne's Episcopal Church (disambiguation)
