= St. Ann's Episcopal Church =

St. Ann's Episcopal Church or St. Anne's Episcopal Church may refer to: (listed by state, then city/town)

- St. Anne's Episcopal Church (Middletown, Delaware)
- St. Anne's Episcopal Church (Anna, Illinois), listed on the National Register of Historic Places (NRHP)
- St. Anne's Episcopal Church (Calais, Maine), NRHP-listed
- St. Anne's Church (Annapolis, Maryland), NRHP-listed
- St. Ann's Episcopal Church (Bronx), New York
- St. Ann & the Holy Trinity Church, Brooklyn, New York
- Saint Ann's School (Brooklyn), New York
- St. Ann's Episcopal Church (Sayville, New York), listed on the NRHP in Suffolk County, New York
- St. Ann's Episcopal Church (Nashville, Tennessee), NRHP-listed
- St. Ann's Episcopal Church (Richford, Vermont), NRHP-listed

== See also ==
- St. Anne's Church (disambiguation), including several name variations
