= Whitlocks Mill Light =

Lighthouse in Maine, US

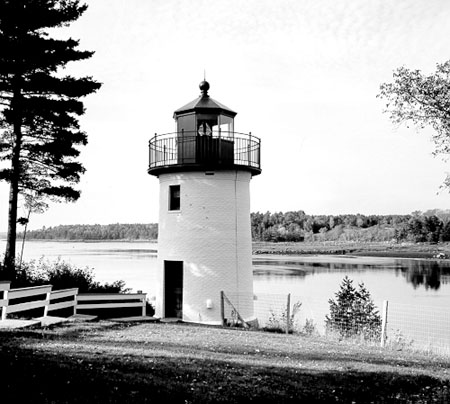
- Undated photograph of Whitlocks Mill Light Light (USCG)
- Location: south shore of St. Croix River east of Calais, Maine
- Coordinates: 45°9′45.370″N 67°13′38.566″W

Tower
- Constructed: 1892
- Foundation: Dressed stone/timber
- Construction: Brick, ceramic tile lining
- Automated: 1969
- Height: 25 feet (7.6 m)
- Shape: Cylindrical
- Markings: White w/black lantern
- Heritage: National Register of Historic Places listed place

Light
- First lit: 1909 (current tower)
- Focal height: 32 feet (9.8 m)
- Lens: 4th order Fresnel lens (original), VLB-44 (2009)
- Range: 6 nmi (11 km; 6.9 mi)
- Characteristic: Iso G 6s
- Whitlocks Mill Light Station
- U.S. National Register of Historic Places
- U.S. Historic district
- Nearest city: Calais, Maine
- Area: 1 acre (0.40 ha)
- Built: 1910
- Architect: US Army Corps of Engineers
- MPS: Light Stations of Maine MPS
- NRHP reference No.: 87002276
- Added to NRHP: January 21, 1988

The Whitlocks Mill Light is a lighthouse on the south bank of the St. Croix River in Calais, Maine. It is the northernmost lighthouse in the state of Maine, and was the last light to be built in the state.

== Description ==
The light station includes a tower, keeper's house, equipment shed, oil house, and bell house. The keeper's house, now privately owned, is an L-shaped two-story gambrel roof oriented to face the river. The tower is a circular brick structure, topped by a lantern house surrounded by an iron railing. The bell house is distinctive as one of the few surviving period pyramidal bell houses. The oil house is a small brick gable-roofed structure, typical of oil houses at other light stations.

== History ==
This light marks a bend in the river, and was established as a light station in 1892. The original light was a lantern hung in the tree by the local miller after whom the station was named. In 1910 the present complex was built, with a fourth-order Fresnel lens mounted in the lantern house.

In 1969 the light was automated, and the Fresnel lens was replaced with a standard 9.8 inches (250 mm) optic. The old lens was later put on display at the Shore Village Museum in Rockland (now part of the Maine Lighthouse Museum). In 2009, the 250mm optic was replaced with an LED VLB-44. In 1970, the station was leased to the Washington County Vocational Technical Institute; eventually the keeper's house and grounds passed into private hands, but the Coast Guard retained ownership of the light tower itself.

In 1999 the tower was deeded to the St. Croix Historical Society as part of the Maine Lighthouse Program, a precursor to the National Historic Lighthouse Preservation Act. The light was added to the National Register of Historic Places as Whitlocks Mill Light Station on January 21, 1988, reference number 87002276.

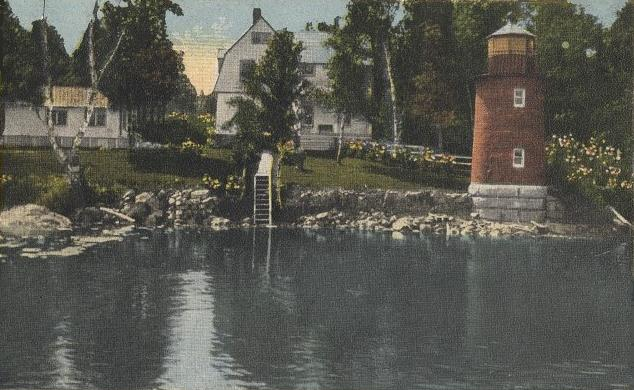
1916 postcard

== See also ==
- National Register of Historic Places listings in Washington County, Maine
