= Calais Observatory =

- U.S. National Register of Historic Places
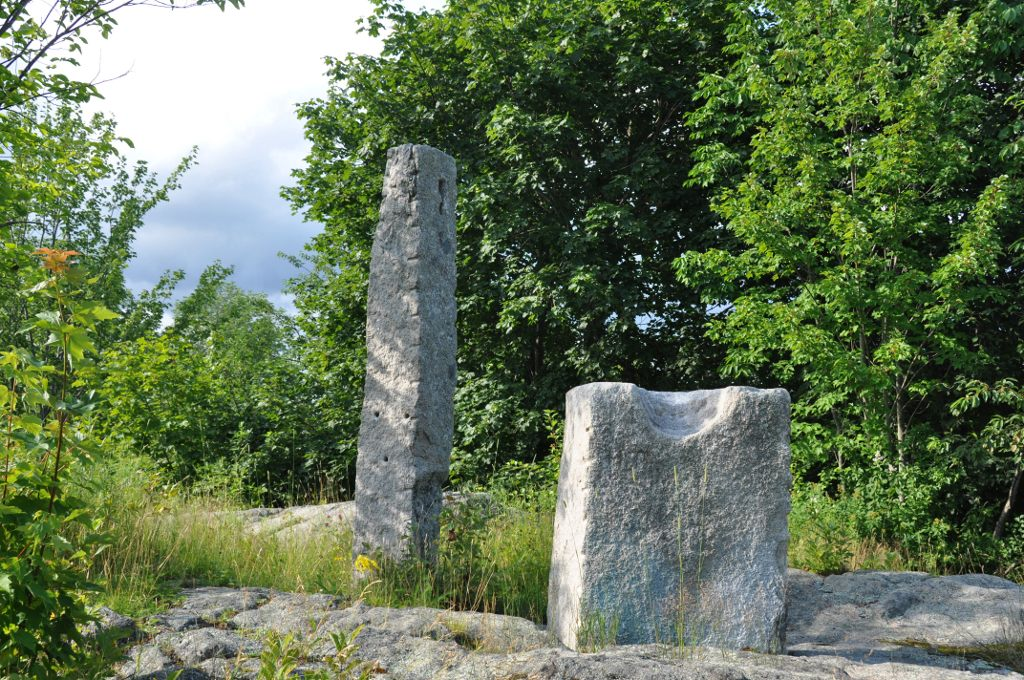

- Location within Maine Location within the United States
- Location: Meridian Park, North and Lincoln Streets, Calais, Maine
- Coordinates: 45°11′5.15″N 67°16′50.74″W
- Area: 0.5 acres (0.20 ha)
- Built: 1857
- NRHP reference No.: 12001069
- Added to NRHP: December 19, 2012

The Calais Observatory is a pair of granite fixtures in Meridian Park in Calais, Maine. The two stones were used for mounting scientific equipment used in a variety of astronomical observations, principally for the accurate calculation by the United States Coast Survey of Calais's longitude with respect to meridians in Cambridge, Massachusetts, and Greenwich, England. The site was listed on the National Register of Historic Places in 2012, and is part of the National Oceanic and Atmospheric Administration's Heritage Trail program. At the time of its longitude determination in 1866 with respect to the Greenwich Meridian, it was arguably one of the most precisely located places in the United States.

== Description ==
The Calais Observatory site is located on a granite knob in Meridian Park, on the grounds of the former Calais Academy, at the corner of North and Lincoln Streets. The surviving elements of the observatory are two granite fixtures, along with flat pads chiseled out of the bedrock, and several drill holes. The site was known to be sheltered by a nominally permanent structure in both 1857 and 1866, but had by 1895 lost whatever shelter it had.

The shorter of the two granite fixtures is called the transit stone; it stands about 3 feet 6 inches (1.07 m) tall, 2 feet 7 inches (0.79 m) wide, and 2 feet (0.61 m) deep, and is oriented so that its sides align with the cardinal compass points. The top of the stone is incised with two channels, for aligning an astronomical transit and to accommodate the device's crank. The taller fixture is known as the clock stone, and about 1 foot (0.30 m) square at its base, tapering to 8 inches (0.20 m) at its top 8 feet (2.4 m) off the ground. It is located about 2 feet (0.61 m) west of the transit stone, and has a number of grooves and holes carved into it. The exact function of this stone is not documented, but its features are consistent with the mounting of a Hardy pendulum clock of the type used by the survey crews. The clock would have been removed from its case and mounted on this stone; the transit stone would not have accommodated the clock. In addition to the two stone fixtures, there are rough square pads carved out of the bedrock about 4.5 feet (1.4 m) north and south of the transit stone, and there are two holes drilled into the bedrock, 20 feet (6.1 m) and 36 feet (11 m) west of the transit stone; the function of these features is not known.

== History ==
The accurate calculation of a location's longitude was long a critical element of maritime navigation. After abortive previous attempts, the United States Coast Survey began work in the 1830s to produce a consistent set of nautical charts for the nation's coastline. The Harvard College Observatory in Cambridge, Massachusetts was chosen in 1847 as the site of the prime reference point for the longitude determinations, and survey work extended from there. The advent of telegraphy made possible the simultaneous exchange of time signals between distant locations to determine the difference in time between observed passage of an object in the sky (often Polaris) at different locations. With sufficiently accurate time pieces, longitude could be determined with significant precision.

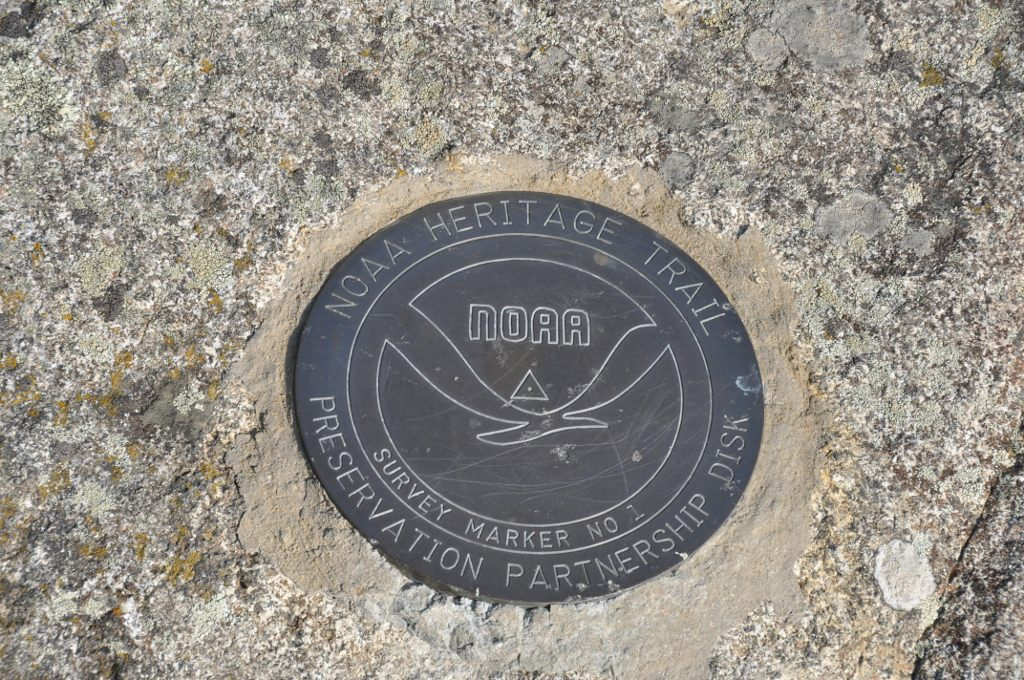
NOAA plaque marking the historic site

On August 31, 1857, a survey crew installed equipment at this site, and at Thomas Hill in Bangor, Maine, and its longitude was established with respect to Cambridge, and to facilitate the determination of longitude at the observatory in Fredericton, New Brunswick. With the advent of transatlantic communications cables (first laid in 1858), the idea of coordinating the longitude with respect to the Greenwich Meridian became feasible. Although the first cable failed soon after operation, a second cable was laid 1866, connecting Foilhommerum on Valentia Island in Ireland with Heart's Content, Newfoundland. The longitudes of the Irish and Newfoundland stations were determined with respect to Greenwich in the summer of 1866, and in December of that year, observations were conducted at Calais to determine its longitude with respect to Greenwich. This allowed the entire United States longitudinal framework to be coordinated with that of Great Britain. The observatory was used once more, in 1895, to determine with greater precision its longitude with respect to Cambridge.

In 1998 the transit stone was found to have been pushed over and set against a nearby tree. The city returned it to its original 1857 location, and a surveyor with the National Geodetic Survey (one of the successors to the U.S. Coast Survey) in 2004 confirmed the stone's location to be within 2 inches (5.1 cm) of its 1866 observed location.

== See also ==
- List of astronomical observatories
- National Register of Historic Places listings in Washington County, Maine
