= Theodore Jellison House =

Historic house in Maine, United States

- U.S. National Register of Historic Places
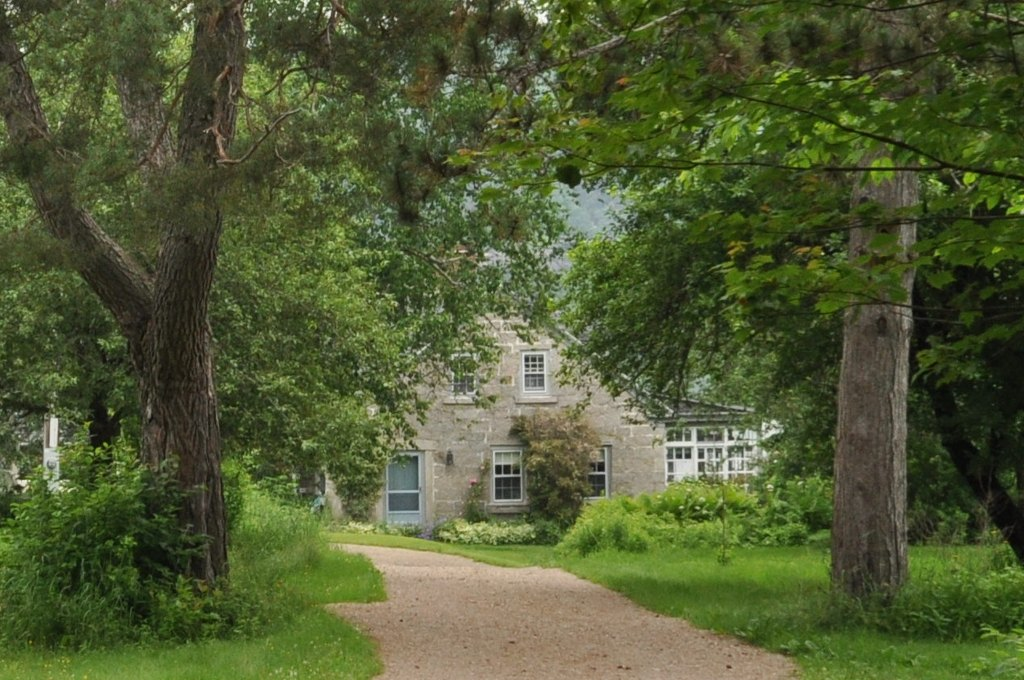

- Location within Maine Location within the United States
- Location: River Rd., Calais, Maine
- Coordinates: 45°9′53″N 67°12′2″W
- Area: 0.5 acres (0.20 ha)
- Built: 1825
- Architect: Theodore Jellison
- Architectural style: Greek Revival
- NRHP reference No.: 84000274
- Added to NRHP: November 23, 1984

The Theodore Jellison House, also known locally as the Stone House, is a historic house on River Road in eastern Calais, Maine. Built in 1825, it is one of the oldest surviving residences in the town, and an impressive local example of granite construction. Theodore Jellison, its builder, was a local owner of granite quarries. The house was listed on the National Register of Historic Places in 1984.

== Description and history ==
The Jellison House stands on the south bank of the St. Croix River, about 2 miles (3.2 km) east of the center of Calais, and is accessed via a tree-lined lane running north from River Road (United States Route 1). It is a 1 1/2-story masonry structure, built out of roughly-dressed granite blocks, giving walls that are 26 inches (66 cm) thick. Its gabled roof is oriented north–south, and there is a shed-roof porch on the east side and a cross-gabled wood-frame addition extending to the west. The house is built on the sloping bank of the river, and exposes a full basement story on its north side, where an entrance faces the stone remains of a wharf. Its south side is its main facade, with the entrance set in the leftmost of three bays on the ground floor, and two windows at the attic level.

The house was built in 1825 by Theodore Jellison, a businessman who owned a number of area granite quarries. He apparently built the house and wharf to demonstrate the utility of product he was selling. Jellison also apparently harbored the idea that this area would eventually become the center of Calais, but this did not come to pass.

== See also ==
- National Register of Historic Places listings in Washington County, Maine
