= Hiram L. Grant =

American politician (1843–1922)

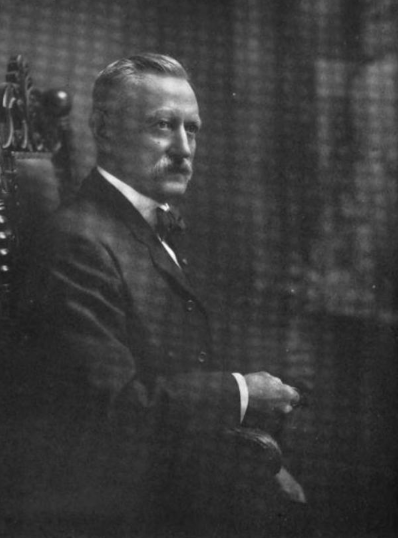
Hiram Lewis Grant

Hiram Lewis Grant (January 26, 1843 – March 8, 1922) was an American military officer, businessman, and politician. Born in Rhode Island, he served in the U.S. Army during the American Civil War and thereafter settled in Goldsboro, North Carolina. He served in the North Carolina Senate during the 1890s.

== Early life ==
Hiram Lewis Grant was born on January 26, 1843 in Woonsocket, Rhode Island, United States. He was educated in local schools.

== Military service ==
Following the outbreak of the American Civil War, Grant enlisted in Company A, 6th Connecticut Infantry Regiment, United States Army as a private on September 3, 1861. On July 23, 1863, he was wounded while attacking artillery positions at Fort Wagner during the Second Battle of Charleston Harbor. He spent the next eight months convalescing in a hospital in Beaufort, North Carolina before rejoining the regiment on provost duty at Hilton Head. He was later dispatched to Virginia and served with the 10th Army Corps before participating in the Second Battle of Fort Fisher. Afterwards, he served as provost marshal of federal garrisons in Wilmington and Goldsboro, North Carolina. He was honorably discharged on August 24, 1865.

Following the outbreak of the Spanish–American War in 1898, Grant was appointed paymaster with the rank of major and served in that capacity for 13 months, including duty in Washington D. C., Puerto Rico, and New York City. He was discharged in 1899.

== Political career ==
Following his discharge, Grant briefly returned to New England before eventually relocating to Goldsboro. A member of the Republican Party, he served as a delegate to the 1868 state constitutional convention, representing Wayne County. He also served as Goldsboro's postmaster for 13 years. In 1873, he was elected to Goldsboro Township's school committee.

Grant supported the creation of a Fusionist coalition of Republicans and Populists in North Carolina 1890s and was subsequently elected to the North Carolina Senate. During his tenure he chaired the Senate's Committee on Education and informally served as a spokesman for private railroad interests. In 1897, he introduced a successful change to the state's election law which modified local boards of elections and gave them authority to appoint local registrars and judges. Following the splintering of the Fusionist coalition and electoral losses in 1898, Grant declared that he was in favor of prohibiting blacks from holding public office.

In November 1899, Grant was hired to serve as the clerk of court for the United States District Court for the Eastern District of North Carolina. He held the position until 1913.

== Later life ==
In Goldsboro, Grant ran a brick manufacturing business and a realty company. In 1868 he married Lizzie Green and had five children with her. He was an active member of the Loyal League and the Grand Army of the Republic. He succumbed to heart failure and died on March 8, 1922, at his home in Goldsboro.

== Works cited ==
- Anderson, Eric (1980). Race and Politics in North Carolina, 1872–1901: The Black Second. Baton Rouge: Louisiana State University Press. ISBN 9780807107843 – via Google Books.
- Cheney, John L. Jr., ed. (1981). North Carolina Government, 1585-1979: A Narrative and Statistical History (revised ed.). Raleigh: North Carolina Secretary of State. OCLC 1290270510.
- Crow, Jeffrey J.; Durden, Robert F. (1977). Maverick Republican in the Old North State : A Political Biography of Daniel L. Russell. Baton Rouge: Louisiana State University Press. ISBN 9780807102916.
- History of North Carolina. Vol. V (North Carolina Biography ed.). Chicago and New York: The Lewis Publishing Company. 1919.
