= Robert Siegel Architects =

New York City-based architecture firm

Siegel
- Type: Architect firm
- Founded: 1991
- Headquarters: New York City, United States
- Key people: Robert Siegel
- Website: website

Siegel (formerly Robert Siegel Architects) is a New York City-based architecture firm that designs new buildings, renovations and interiors for a wide range of clients and programs. Their public, academic, cultural, commercial and residential projects are located throughout the United States, Korea, China, and Japan. The firms has a won 30 design awards and has appeared in over 50 publications.

Siegel has designed a variety of building types, including major civic commissions such as the U.S. Land Port of Entry in Calais, Maine and the Korean Embassy in Beijing, China. University projects include the Graduate School of Arts & Sciences Lounge at Columbia University, The Miller Theater at Columbia University, new Residence Halls for Bard College, and major renovations to the 1960s and 1970s Visual Arts, Dance and Music buildings at SUNY Purchase. Robert designed the new auditorium building for Capital One, the Swissair First / Business Class Lounge at JFK Airport, and interiors for Tishman Hotels. The firm designs residential buildings and interiors for private clients.

== About Robert Siegel ==
Robert Siegel established his private practice in 1991 after earning his Master of Science in Architecture from Columbia University and his Bachelor of Architecture from Syracuse University. He has taught architectural design and building technology at Parsons School of Design, Syracuse University, the Boston Architectural Center, Pratt Institute, City College, and NJIT. Robert is the former chair of the AIA New York Chapter Committee on the Environment and is a founding member of the Advisory Board for Syracuse University’s Study Abroad program. Appointed by the Commissioner of the United States General Services Administration, Robert Siegel serves as a National Peer Reviewer for Design Excellence in Architecture and on the Planning Board for the Town of Bedford, NY

Robert Siegel is registered in New York State and is a member of the American Institute of Architects (AIA). He is former Chair of the New York City Chapter AIA Committee on the Environment. Robert Siegel was the architect for the first two federal buildings in Maine to earn LEED Gold.

== Projects ==
(most recent on top)

- House 432, Katonah, NY
- United States Land Port of Entry- Calais, Maine
- Bard College Residence Halls - Annandale-on-Hudson, New York
- Swissair First Class and Business Class Lounge - John F. Kennedy International Airport, Jamaica, New York
- SUNY College at Purchase Dance Conservatory - Purchase, New York
- SUNY College at Purchase Music Conservatory - Purchase, New York
- Razor and Tie - New York, New York
- Pohang City Hall - Pohang, Korea
- Capital One Auditorium - McLean, Virginia
- 53 North Moore Lobby - New York, New York
- Sunwall - Washington, DC
- Egyptian Museum Competition - Egypt
- King Penthouse - New York, New York
- Private House Addition - United States
- Kawaja Penthouse - New York, NY
- Dixon Loft - New York, NY
- Biblioteca de Mexico - Mexico City
- Balsam Loft - New York, New York
- Bauman Apartment - New York, New York
- Korean Embassy - Beijing, China
- Korean Foreign Ministry - Seoul, Korea
- National Museum of Korea - Seoul, Korea
- Higashi-Gotanda Master Plan - Tokyo, Japan
- Swiss Center Façade & Shared Facility for Swissair, Switzerland Tourism and Reusch International - New York, NY
- Pfizer Conference Center - Jersey City, NJ
- Modular Urban Housing - Pittsburgh, PA
- New York Comprehensive Care Center - New York, NY
- W Residence - New York, NY
- Urban Playground - Volunteers of America Bronx Early Learning Center
- Becker House - Gloucester, MA

== Recognition ==
=== Awards ===
2012 ACEC-NY Engineering Excellence Platinum Award, Award
U.S. Land Port of Entry in Calais, Maine

2011 AIA New York State Design Award, Award
U.S. Land Port of Entry in Calais, Maine

2010 U.S. General Services Administration Design Excellence Award, Award
U.S. Land Port of Entry in Calais, Maine

2008 FHWA Transportation Planning Excellence, Honorable Mention
U.S. Land Port of Entry in Calais, Maine

2007 AIA New York City Design Award, Award
U.S. Land Port of Entry in Calais, Maine

2007 AIA Westchester Design Honor Award for Historic Preservation, Award
Dance Conservatory at SUNY Purchase

Award of Excellence, Best Building, Low Rise, NAIOP Northern Virginia Awards
Capital One Auditorium

Award of Merit, Best Interiors, Building Common Area (for Atrium), NAIOP Northern Virginia Awards
Capital One Auditorium

2003 Pohang City Hall Design/Build Competition, 2nd Place
Design build competition for the city hall

2001 AIA New York State Design Award, Award
Bard College Residence Halls

1999 AIA/Boston Sustainable Design Awards, Special Award for Urban Intervention
Urban Playground, Bronx, NY

1996 AIA New York City Design Award, Award
Recycled Ground – An Urban Playground

1995 Korean Embassy in China Design Competition, 1st Place Design Commission
Korean Embassy in Beijing, China

1995 National Museum of Korea Competition, Honorable Mention

1994 AIA New York City Design Award, Award
Recycled Ground – An Urban Playground

1992 Pittsburgh Housing Competition, Honorable Mention
