= Robert E. Siegel =

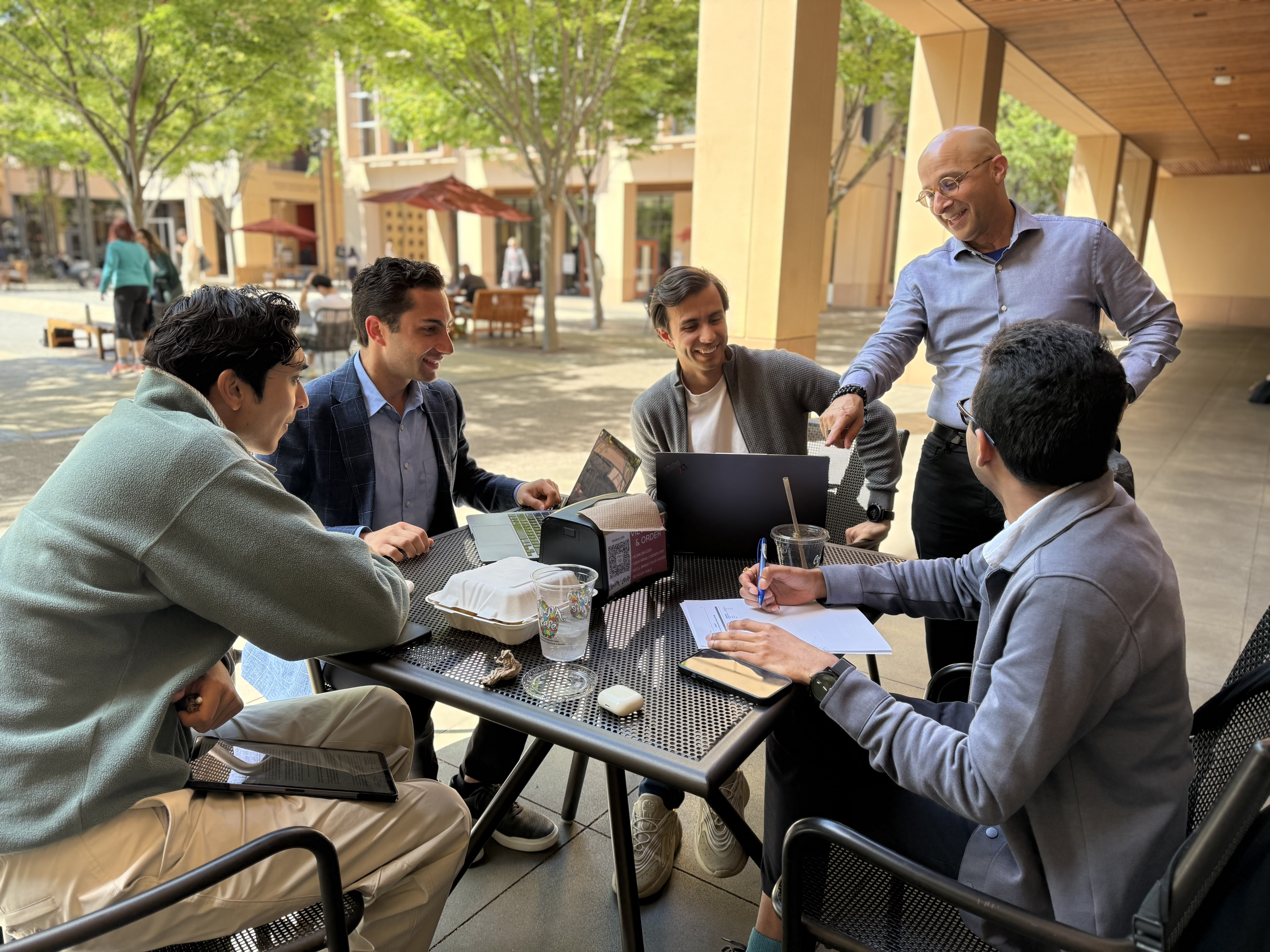
- Rob Siegel with his students at Stanford
- Known for: Case studies on entrepreneurship, Systems leadership

Academic background
- Education: University of California, Berkeley (BA); Stanford University (MBA)

Academic work
- Institutions: Stanford Graduate School of Business

Robert E. Siegel is an American academic, venture capitalist, and author. He is a lecturer at the Stanford Graduate School of Business, where he teaches courses on entrepreneurship and innovation.

== Early life and education ==
Siegel obtained a Bachelor of Arts degree in political science from the University of California, Berkeley, in 1989 and an M.B.A. from the Stanford Graduate School of Business in 1994.

== Career ==
Siegel began his career at GeoWorks, serving in sales and marketing roles until its public offering in 1993. He then joined Intel Corporation, working in management positions, including corporate business development, and contributed as a lead researcher for Andy Grove’s book Only the Paranoid Survive. In 1998, he co-founded Weave Innovations Inc., which developed the first digital picture frame and was acquired by Kodak. From 2001 to 2004, he was Executive Vice President at Pixim, Inc., acquired by Sony. Between 2004 and 2007, he managed the Video and Software Solutions division at GE Security, overseeing $350 million in annual revenues.

Since 2008, Siegel has been a General Partner at XSeed Capital, and since 2019, a Venture Partner at Piva Capital, focusing on technology investments. His investments include Zooz, acquired by PayU, and Lex Machina, acquired by LexisNexis.

== Academic career ==
Siegel joined Stanford GSB in 2011 as a Lecturer in Management, teaching courses such as Systems Leadership and Financial Management for Entrepreneurs. He has authored over 115 case studies on companies including Google, Charles Schwab, and Daimler AG. His research focuses on strategy and innovation, with articles published in the Harvard Business Review and California Management Review. He has explored topics such as financial management for growing companies and global corporate governance. He co-teaches a course on leadership at Stanford with former General Electric Chairman and CEO, Jeff Immelt.

== Personal life ==
Siegel is married with three children.

== Awards and recognition ==
Siegel received the Case Centre Award in the Entrepreneurship Category for "AB InBev: Brewing an Innovation Strategy" in 2019 and "Axel Springer in 2014: Strategic Leadership of the Digital Media Transformation" in 2017. He was also awarded the MBA Class of 1973 Lecturer award at Stanford GSB for the 2016-2017 academic year.

== Board memberships ==
Siegel serves on the Supervisory Board of HERE Technologies (since 2023) and TTTech Auto AG (since 2018), and the Board of Directors for LUUM (since 2017) and Avochato (since 2016). He has been Chairman of the Strategic Advisory Board at TTTech Computertechnik AG since 2012 and a member of Tulco’s Advisory Board since 2017.

== Publications ==
Siegel has written two books:

- The Brains and Brawn Company: How Leading Organizations Blend the Best of Digital and Physical (McGraw Hill, 2021), which examines the integration of digital and physical business strategies.
- The Systems Leader: Mastering the Cross-Pressures That Make or Break Today’s Companies (Penguin Random House, 2024), focusing on leadership challenges in modern business environments.

His academic articles include:

- "The Problem with Legacy Ecosystems" (Harvard Business Review, 2016)
- "Defining the Minimum Winning Game in High-Technology Ventures" (California Management Review, 2007)
- "Cutting the Strategy Diamond in High-Technology Ventures" (California Management Review, 2008)
