= Henrietta Brewer House =

Historic house in Maine, United States

- U.S. National Register of Historic Places
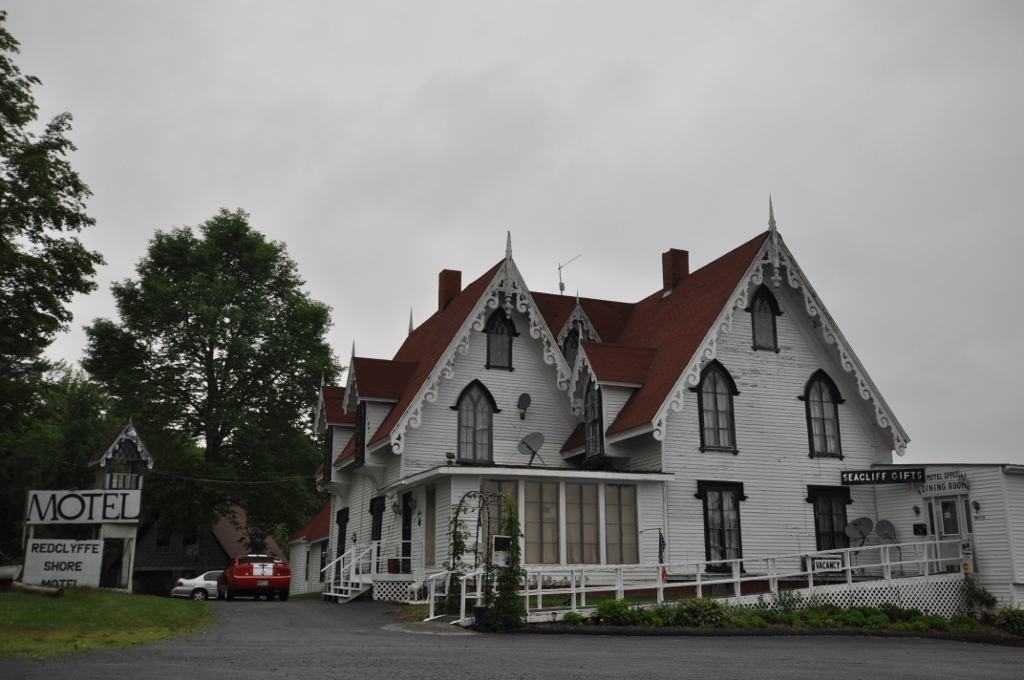
- Henrietta Brewer House/ Redclyffe Shore Motel in 2013

- Location within Maine Location within the United States
- Location: US 1, Robbinston, Maine
- Coordinates: 45°5′4″N 67°6′41″W
- Area: 0.5 acres (0.20 ha)
- Built: 1861
- Architectural style: Gothic Revival
- NRHP reference No.: 83003688
- Added to NRHP: October 6, 1983

The Henrietta Brewer House, originally The Cottage House and now Redclyffe Shore Motel, is a historic private residence located on U.S. Route 1 in Robbinston, Maine, United States. Erected between 1861 and 1863, the house is one of the finest examples of high-style Gothic Revival architecture in Down East Maine. The house was listed on the National Register of Historic Places in 1983. Cabins built along the Passamaquoddy Bay are used as motel units.

== Description and history ==
The Henrietta Brewer House is set on a bluff overlooking the St. Croix River, about 12 miles (19 km) south of Calais on United States Route 1. It is a 2 1/2-story wood-frame structure with irregular and somewhat rambling massing, with steeply pitched gable roof sections, and clapboard siding. The house's ornate Gothic Revival features include lancet-arch windows with eared hoods, jigsawn vergeboard in most of its gables, and finials at the points of the gables. The roof has two major north–south gabled sections, which are joined by a transverse section, with dormers projecting at a variety of points. The interior features high quality finishes in the Greek Revival style.

The erection of the house was started in 1861 and completed in 1863 for Henrietta Brewer, the wife of John Nehemiah Marks Brewer, whose Greek Revival house stands a short way to the south. Of the houses in this part of eastern Maine, it is the only major example of high Victorian Gothic style. Comparable houses in Calais (notably the Gilmore and Washburn houses, have a less formal Carpenter Gothic flavor.

== See also ==
- National Register of Historic Places listings in Washington County, Maine
