= Robert Anthony Siegel =

American writer and professor

Robert Anthony Siegel is an American writer and professor. He is the author of two novels and numerous short stories and essays, and has been recognized with O. Henry and Pushcart Prizes among other awards. He is currently an instructor at the University of North Carolina Wilmington's Creative Writing Department.

== Education ==
A native New Yorker, Siegel was born, raised, and educated on Manhattan. While in high school, he began the study of both Japanese and judo, becoming fluent in the former and a champion in the latter. For his undergraduate education, he attended Harvard University, where he majored in East Asian studies and spent his junior year in Tokyo. He returned to Japan following graduation and studied Comparative Literature at the University of Tokyo on a Mombukagakusho Fellowship. In the early 1990s, he studied at the Iowa Writers Workshop where he received his MFA. The year after that, he was in Provincetown, Massachusetts, on a writing fellowship at The Fine Arts Work Center.

== Writing career ==
In 1997, his first novel All the Money in the World was published. This was followed in 2007 by his second, All Will Be Revealed. An essay collection, Criminals, was published by Counterpoint Press in 2018. His work has appeared in The New York Times, The Los Angeles Times, The Oxford American, The Paris Review, and Tin House, among other venues.

== Novels ==
- All Will Be Revealed, MacAdam/Cage Publishing, 2008, ISBN 978-1-59692-285-3
- All the Money in the World, Random House, 1997, ISBN 978-0-517-31688-7

== Essay collection ==
- Criminals, Counterpoint Press, forthcoming in 2017

== Short stories (selected) ==
- "The Right Imaginary Person,” Tin House, Winter 2012.
- “What the American Public Wants,” PANK Online, July 2010.
- “The Memoirs of Edwin Chester,” Ecotone, Fall/Winter 2008.
- *“Eulogy,” Five Chapters, Summer 2007.
- “Verena Swann,” Ecotone, Vol. 2, No. 1, Fall/Winter 2006.
- “The Magic Box,” Post Road 11, Fall 2005.
- “Moving Through the Dark,” Story, Summer 1992.

== Essays (selected) ==
- "Criminals," The Paris Review
- "Gourmets," Tin House, Fall 2014.
- "My Mother, My Writing Student," The New York Times Draft Column, June 21, 2014. Reprinted in the print edition, June 22, 2014.
- "Unreliable Tour Guide," Ploughshares, Winter 2013.
- “Kawabata Yasunari: The Breeze in the Ink Painting,” Ploughshares, Fall 2013.
- "Three Notes on Jesus' Son," Treehouse, May 2012.
- “Sean,” Harvard Review 38, Spring/Summer 2010.
- “Haiku for an Ailing Father,” Los Angeles Times Book Review: Off the Shelf, July 2009.
- “The Sword, the Light and the Nintendo DS,” with Karen E. Bender, Tablet, December 2007.
- “An Ode to My Backyard,” The Oxford American, No. 53, Spring 2006.

== Anthologies (selected) ==
- "The Right Imaginary Person," translated as "Tadashii kakuu no hito" in Eigo de yomu Murakami Haruku: sekai no naka no Nihon bungaku, nigatsu-go, 2015, Fujii Hikaru, translator. Tokyo: NHK Publishing, 2015.
- "The Right Imaginary Person," in The O. Henry Prize Stories 2014, Laura Furman, ed. New York: Anchor Books, 2014.
- “Sean,” in Pushcart Prize XXXVI: Best of the Small Presses, Bill Henderson, ed. New York: Pushcart Press, 2012.
- “Sean,” in Freud’s Blind Spot: 23 Original Essays on Cherished, Estranged, Lost, Hurtful, Hopeful, Complicated Siblings, Elisa Albert, ed. New York: Simon and Schuster, 2010.
- “The Sword, the Light and the Nintendo DS,” with Karen E. Bender, in How To Spell Chanukah: 18 Writers on 8 Nights of Light. Emily Franklin, ed. Chapel Hill: Algonquin Books, 2007.

== Articles, reviews, writer interviews (selected) ==
- "I Think I Would Rather Be a Painter," The Paris Review Daily, August 10, 2015
- "Vermeer in Manhattan," The Paris Review Daily, August 3, 2015
- "Enigmatic Interiors: On Love, Death, Divorce, and Michael White’s New Travels in Vermeer,” Los Angeles Review of Books, June 2015
- "Terayama Shuji's The Crimson Thread of Abandon," Three Percent, May 2015
- "Yan Lianke's The Four Books," The Rumpus, April 2015
- "Bookforum Talks with Yan Lianke," Bookforum, December 2013.
- "Bookforum Talks with Karen E. Bender," Bookforum, September 2013.
- "Bookforum Talks with Peter Trachtenberg," Bookforum, August 2013.
- “Syllabus: Unfinished Novels,” Bookforum, August 2013.

== Awards and fellowships ==
- 2014 O. Henry Prize ("The Right Imaginary Person")
- 2013–2014 Fulbright Senior Scholar, Tunghai University, Taiwan
- 2012 Pushcart Prize ("Sean")
- 2009–2010 Artist Fellowship Award, North Carolina Arts Council
- 1992–93 Writing Fellowship, Fine Arts Workcenter at Provincetown
- 1992 Michener-Engle Fellowship, University of Iowa
- 1983–85 Mombukagakusho Fellowship, Japanese Ministry of Education, Tokyo, Japan
