= Robert Franklin Durden =

American historian (1925–2016)

- Born: May 10, 1925; Graymont, Georgia, U.S.
- Died: March 4, 2016 (aged 90); Durham, North Carolina, U.S.
- Education: Emory University; Princeton University (PhD)
- Occupations: Historian; author
- Spouse: Anne Oller

Robert Franklin Durden (May 10, 1925 – March 4, 2016) was an American historian and author who worked at Duke University. He wrote books about Duke's history, journalist James S. Pike, and historian Carter G. Woodson.

He was born in Graymont, Georgia, to Virgil Edward Durden and Mildred Donaldson Durden. He studied at Emanuel County Institute and Emory University. He served in the U.S. Navy. He received a Ph.D. from Princeton in 1952. He married Anne Oller. He retired from Duke in 2001 and was awarded the University Medal. He died in Durham, North Carolina.

Duke has a collection of his papers. He had two daughters, two granddaughters, and six great-grandchildren. His ashes were spread in the Sarah P. Duke Gardens where his wife's ashes were also placed.

== Writings ==
- Reconstruction bonds & twentieth-century politics : South Dakota v. North Carolina, 1904 1967
- The Launching of Duke University, 1924-1949 1993
- The Dukes of Durham and The Launching of Duke University 1987
- Electrifying the Piedmont Carolinas: The Duke Power Company, 1904-1997 2001
- Bold Entrepreneur: A Life of James B. Duke 2009
- The Gray and the Black: The Confederate Debate on Emancipation winner of the Jules F. Landry Award
- Carter G. Woodson: Father of African-American History
- The Self-Inflicted Wound: Southern Politics in the 19th Century 1985
- James Shepherd Pike: Republicanism and the American Negro, 1850-82
- The Climax of Populism; The Election of 1896
- Lasting Legacy to the Carolinas; The Duke Endowment 1924-1994 1998
