= Holmes Cottage =

Historic house in Maine, United States

- U.S. National Register of Historic Places
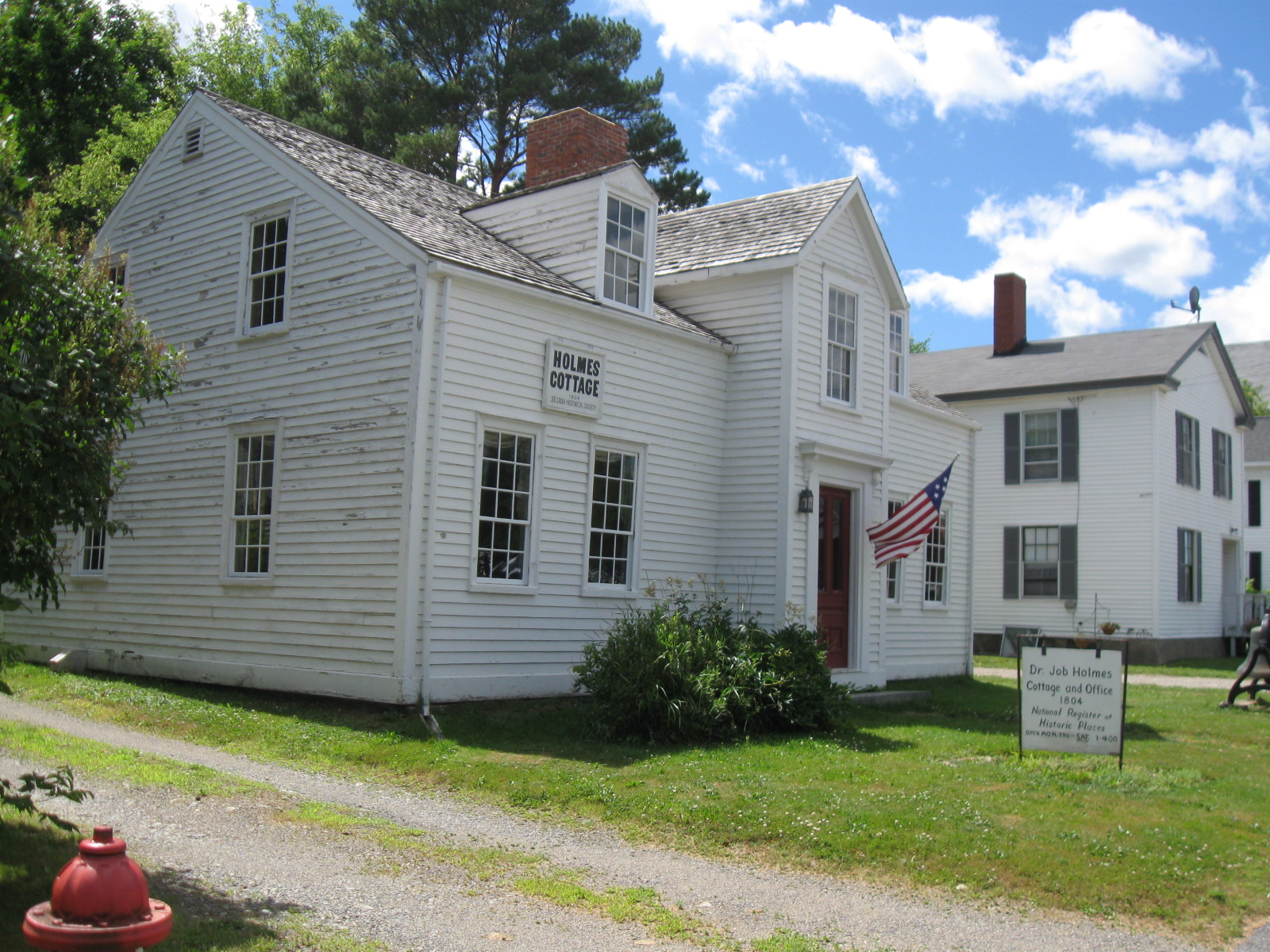

- Location within Maine Location within the United States
- Location: 521 Main St., Calais, Maine
- Coordinates: 45°11′15″N 67°16′28″W
- Area: less than one acre
- Built: 1820
- NRHP reference No.: 87001855
- Added to NRHP: April 4, 1988

The Holmes Cottage is a historic house at 521 Main Street in Calais, Maine. Estimated to have been built about 1820, it is the oldest surviving structure in the town, and is notable for its association with Dr. Job Holmes, a leading physician during the community's formative years. The cottage, now owned by the St. Croix Historical Society and operated by them as the Dr. Job Holmes Cottage & Museum, was listed on the National Register of Historic Places in 1988.

== Description and history ==
The Holmes Cottage is located on the south side of Main Street (United States Route 1), a short way east of the downtown area. Just to its east stands the Dr. Job Holmes House, also a property of the St. Croix Historical Society. The cottage is a 1 1/2-story wood-frame structure, five bays wide, with a side-gable roof, central chimney, and clapboard siding. The main facade is symmetrical, with a center entrance in a two-story projecting gabled section, which is flanked on the roof by gabled dormers. The interior follows a typical center-chimney plan, with a narrow winding staircase in front of the chimney, the parlor to the left, kitchen to the right, and a long narrow room behind. The parlor exhibits particularly well-preserved original Federal period woodwork and hardware.

The construction date of the house is unknown, with local tradition placing it before 1805. Its first documented owner was Artemus Ward, a Boston land speculator, who bought it in 1805. It later was acquired by Dr. Job Holmes, who lived there with his family until the house next door was built in the 1850s. It remained the Holmes family until it was given to the St. Croix Historical Society in 1954.

== See also ==
- National Register of Historic Places listings in Washington County, Maine
