= Dr. Job Holmes House =

Historic house in Maine, United States

- U.S. National Register of Historic Places
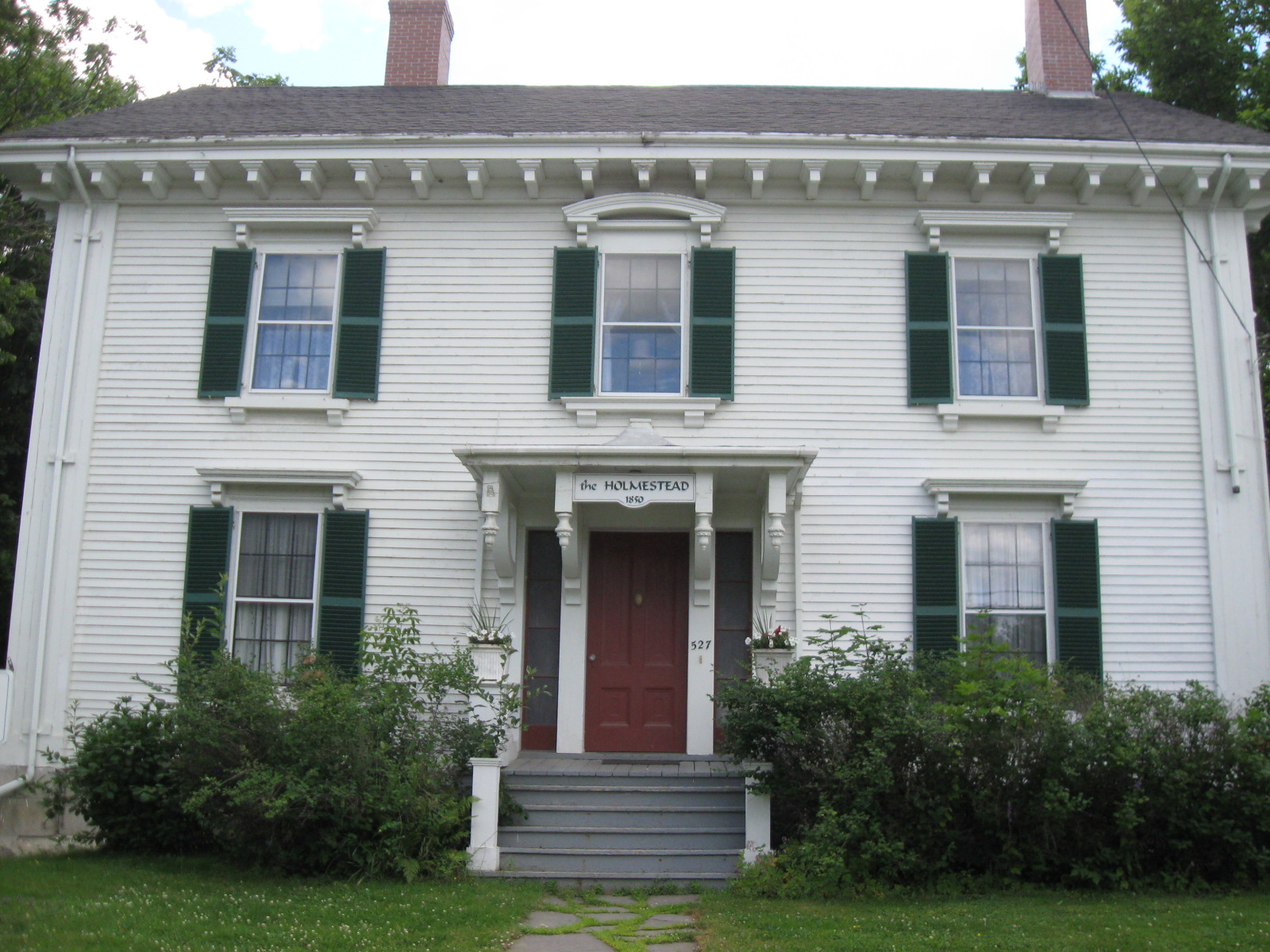

- Location within Maine Location within the United States
- Location: 527 Main St., Calais, Maine
- Coordinates: 45°11′15″N 67°16′26″W
- Area: less than one acre
- Built: 1850
- Built by: Asher B. Bassford
- Architectural style: Italianate
- NRHP reference No.: 90000579
- Added to NRHP: April 5, 1990

The Dr. Job Holmes House is house at 527 Main Street in Calais, Maine. It was built in 1850 by Dr. Job Holmes, a prominent local physician, and is a fine local example of Italianate architecture. It is now owned by the St. Croix Historic Society, along with Holmes' first house, the Holmes Cottage next door, which is operated as Dr. Job Holmes Cottage & Museum.

Dr. Job Holmes House was listed on the National Register of Historic Places in 1990.

== Description and history ==
Dr. Job Holmes House is located on the south side of Main Street (United States Route 1), a short way east of the downtown area. Just to its east stands the Holmes Cottage, also a property of the St. Croix Historical Society. It is a 2 1/2-story wood-frame structure, three bays wide, with a side-gable roof, asymmetrically placed interior brick chimneys, clapboard siding, and a granite foundation. Its entrance is centrally located on the northeast-facing front, with an ornate bracketed hood sheltering the entrance, and a broader hood sheltering the flanking sidelight windows as well. Windows on the facade are topped by bracketed hoods, that on the second floor center window with a curved cornice. The main roof cornice is modillioned. The interior of the house is well-preserved, retaining original woodwork and plaster.

Dr. Job Holmes arrived in Calais sometime after 1830, and established a medical practice, joining his brother-in-law, Cyrus Hamlin, brother to future United States Vice President Hannibal Hamlin. The Holmeses first lived in the cottage next door, and had this house built about 1850. It was built by Asher Bassford, a local builder with a reputation for quality. The house remained in the hands of Homes descendants into the 20th century, and was used as elderly housing before coming to the St. Croix Historical Society.

== See also ==
- National Register of Historic Places listings in Washington County, Maine
