= Robbinston, Maine =

Town in Maine, United States

- Town
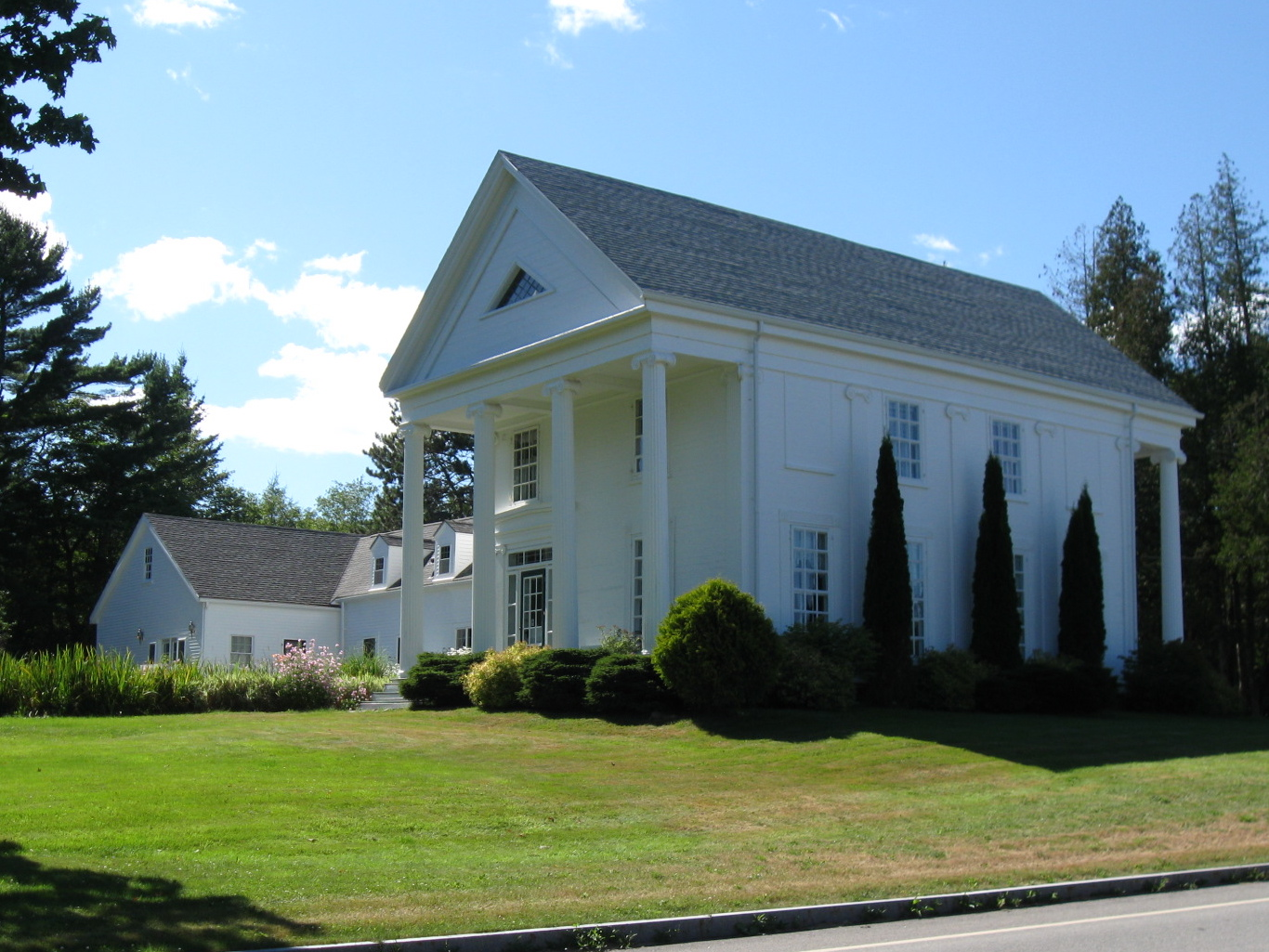
- John N.M. Brewer House

- Location within Maine Location within the United States
- Coordinates: 45°04′12″N 67°08′34″W
- Country: United States
- State: Maine
- County: Washington

Area
  - Total: 33.74 sq mi (87.39 km^{2})
  - Land: 28.19 sq mi (73.01 km^{2})
  - Water: 5.55 sq mi (14.37 km^{2})
- Elevation: 308 ft (94 m)

Population (2020)
  - Total: 539
  - Density: 19/sq mi (7.4/km^{2})
- Time zone: UTC-5 (Eastern (EST))
  - Summer (DST): UTC-4 (EDT)
- ZIP code: 04671
- Area code: 207
- FIPS code: 23-63275
- GNIS feature ID: 582697
- Website: townofrobbinston.org

Robbinston is a town in Washington County, Maine, United States. The population was 539 at the 2020 census.

== Geography ==
According to the United States Census Bureau, the town has a total area of 33.74 square miles (87.39 km^{2}), of which 28.19 square miles (73.01 km^{2}) is land and 5.55 square miles (14.37 km^{2}) is water. It is situated 35 miles (56 km) northeast of Machias, 16 miles (26 km) north of Lubec and 12 miles (19 km) south of Calais.

=== Climate ===
Climate data for Robbinston, Maine (1991–2020 normals, extremes 1994–present)
Month	Jan	Feb	Mar	Apr	May	Jun	Jul	Aug	Sep	Oct	Nov	Dec	Year
Record high °F (°C)	57 (14)	63 (17)	83 (28)	83 (28)	92 (33)	97 (36)	97 (36)	95 (35)	95 (35)	82 (28)	73 (23)	61 (16)	97 (36)
Mean maximum °F (°C)	49.2 (9.6)	48.6 (9.2)	57.3 (14.1)	68.7 (20.4)	81.2 (27.3)	87.8 (31.0)	90.1 (32.3)	88.7 (31.5)	84.8 (29.3)	72.2 (22.3)	62.0 (16.7)	54.5 (12.5)	92.7 (33.7)
Mean daily maximum °F (°C)	28.7 (−1.8)	31.6 (−0.2)	39.7 (4.3)	50.8 (10.4)	62.2 (16.8)	70.9 (21.6)	76.9 (24.9)	76.8 (24.9)	69.1 (20.6)	56.6 (13.7)	45.2 (7.3)	34.4 (1.3)	53.6 (12.0)
Daily mean °F (°C)	19.9 (−6.7)	22.1 (−5.5)	30.8 (−0.7)	41.4 (5.2)	51.7 (10.9)	60.4 (15.8)	66.5 (19.2)	66.3 (19.1)	59.0 (15.0)	48.0 (8.9)	37.7 (3.2)	26.9 (−2.8)	44.2 (6.8)
Mean daily minimum °F (°C)	11.0 (−11.7)	12.7 (−10.7)	21.8 (−5.7)	32.1 (0.1)	41.2 (5.1)	49.9 (9.9)	56.1 (13.4)	55.8 (13.2)	49.0 (9.4)	39.4 (4.1)	30.2 (−1.0)	19.4 (−7.0)	34.9 (1.6)
Mean minimum °F (°C)	−8.5 (−22.5)	−6.6 (−21.4)	1.9 (−16.7)	21.3 (−5.9)	30.3 (−0.9)	39.4 (4.1)	48.5 (9.2)	45.9 (7.7)	35.9 (2.2)	26.9 (−2.8)	15.1 (−9.4)	0.7 (−17.4)	−10.6 (−23.7)
Record low °F (°C)	−20 (−29)	−19 (−28)	−9 (−23)	8 (−13)	24 (−4)	35 (2)	44 (7)	41 (5)	29 (−2)	22 (−6)	5 (−15)	−8 (−22)	−20 (−29)
Average precipitation inches (mm)	4.85 (123)	4.17 (106)	4.82 (122)	4.39 (112)	4.35 (110)	4.10 (104)	3.18 (81)	3.45 (88)	4.23 (107)	5.43 (138)	5.50 (140)	6.27 (159)	54.74 (1,390)
Average snowfall inches (cm)	24.8 (63)	21.9 (56)	18.9 (48)	6.0 (15)	0.2 (0.51)	0.0 (0.0)	0.0 (0.0)	0.0 (0.0)	0.0 (0.0)	0.3 (0.76)	3.6 (9.1)	19.3 (49)	95.0 (241)
Average precipitation days (≥ 0.01 inch)	13.7	12.8	13.1	13.2	14.5	12.3	11.5	9.9	10.0	12.0	12.6	14.1	149.7
Average snowy days (≥ 0.1 in)	11.8	10.5	8.3	3.6	0.2	0.0	0.0	0.0	0.0	0.2	3.2	8.4	46.2
Source: NOAA

== History ==
Robbinston is in Washington County, the easternmost of the United States. As it was settled, the areas, or "Plantations" were numbered, and then became villages and cities. It was named for Edward Hutchinson Robbins and Nathaniel J. Robbins who received a land grant for the area on October 21, 1786, and became the third and fourth family settled there. A post office was established by 1796, and Robbinston was incorporated on February 18, 1811.

The area near Robbinston was first settled by the French explorer Pierre de Monts from 1604 to 1605 and then abandoned when the colony lost 36 people that first winter. That island, once called De Mont's Island, then the Neutral Island, is now the St. Croix Island International Historic Site. It marks the boundary between the United States and Canada as set out by treaty in 1783. Traces of the fort were first excavated in 1798, then the St. Croix Lighthouse was installed in 1856 at the head of Passamaquoddy Bay where it meets the St. Croix River. It now has seven life-sized historical statues as part of the park walk.

The river is 3 miles (5 km) wide separating Robbinston from the town of St. Andrews, New Brunswick, Canada. Still saltwater, the tidal range is 27.5 feet (8.4 m). Because of the abundance of wood, much of the early industry centered around shipbuilding. For example, in 1856, 17 vessels, ranging from 100 to 1000 tons each, were built at Robbinston. When steam-powered ships arrived, Robbinston returned to fishing and farming potatoes, which escaped the blight found in warmer areas. The granite quarry in Red Beach also was a local industry. The seven lakes and streams in Robbinston boasted pickerel, trout, perch and salmon.

During the mid-19th century, Robbinston was a last stop for the Underground Railroad where escaping slaves would cross over into Canada and freedom. One of the houses that supported them still stands, the John N. Brewer Sr Mansion. Built in 1785 with an addition added around 1821, it is on the National Register of Historic Places. The John N. M. Brewer Jr House built in 1826 is across hwy 1 and is now operated as a B&B. Other historical sites in Robbinston are the Grace Episcopal Church, James S. Pike Racing Milestones, Pulpit Rock, Henrietta Brewer Cottage (wife of John Brewer Jr) (Redclyffe Shore Motel) and Sewall Memorial Congregational Church, with its roots in 1817.

Up five miles along Coastal Route 1 is Devil's Head, a high rocky bluff overlooking the river and landmark for watercraft. There is a nice trail and picnic site next to the water. The highest lookout point, at 300 feet (91 m) above sea level, is Trimble Mountain, off Brewer Road. The three islands are accessible by boat, which can be rented or hired.

Many people have family historical roots in the area and visit for business as well as pleasure. The Washington County Historical Society is best contacted in advance, since many of the records are held in the larger towns and are more easily navigated with a little direction.

== Demographics ==
Historical population
Census	Pop.	Note	%±
1820	424		—
1830	616		45.3%
1840	822		33.4%
1850	1,028		25.1%
1860	1,113		8.3%
1870	926		−16.8%
1880	910		−1.7%
1890	787		−13.5%
1900	844		7.2%
1910	691		−18.1%
1920	747		8.1%
1930	583		−22.0%
1940	637		9.3%
1950	554		−13.0%
1960	476		−14.1%
1970	396		−16.8%
1980	492		24.2%
1990	495		0.6%
2000	525		6.1%
2010	574		9.3%
2020	539		−6.1%
U.S. Decennial Census

=== 2010 census ===
As of the census of 2010, there were 574 people, 238 households, and 165 families residing in the town. The population density was 20.4 inhabitants per square mile (7.9/km^{2}). There were 354 housing units at an average density of 12.6 per square mile (4.9/km^{2}). The racial makeup of the town was 96.0% White, 0.2% African American, 2.3% Native American, 0.2% Asian, and 1.4% from two or more races. Hispanic or Latino of any race were 0.3% of the population.

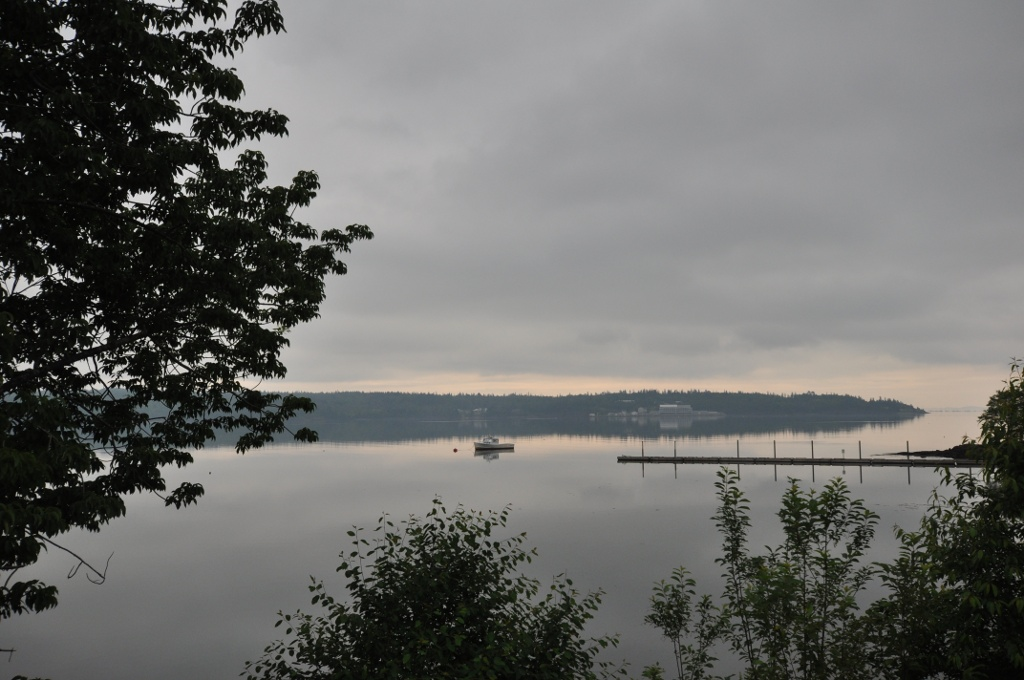
View of the St. Croix River from Robbinston; St. Andrews, New Brunswick lies across the river

There were 238 households, of which 29.8% had children under the age of 18 living with them, 59.2% were married couples living together, 3.4% had a female householder with no husband present, 6.7% had a male householder with no wife present, and 30.7% were non-families. 24.4% of all households were made up of individuals, and 14.7% had someone living alone who was 65 years of age or older. The average household size was 2.41 and the average family size was 2.84.

The median age in the town was 48.6 years. 22.5% of residents were under the age of 18; 5% were between the ages of 18 and 24; 17.2% were from 25 to 44; 35.4% were from 45 to 64; and 19.9% were 65 years of age or older. The gender makeup of the town was 53.1% male and 46.9% female.

=== 2000 census ===
As of the census of 2000, there were 525 people, 201 households, and 157 families residing in the town. The population density was 18.6 people per square mile (7.2/km^{2}). There were 329 housing units at an average density of 11.7 per square mile (4.5/km^{2}). The racial makeup of the town was 95.81% White, 1.33% Native American, and 2.86% from two or more races. Hispanic or Latino of any race were 0.57% of the population.

There were 201 households, out of which 32.3% had children under the age of 18 living with them, 64.7% were married couples living together, 6.0% had a female householder with no husband present, and 21.4% were non-families. 15.9% of all households were made up of individuals, and 10.9% had someone living alone who was 65 years of age or older. The average household size was 2.61 and the average family size was 2.88.

In the town, the population was spread out, with 24.8% under the age of 18, 6.9% from 18 to 24, 25.9% from 25 to 44, 24.0% from 45 to 64, and 18.5% who were 65 years of age or older. The median age was 41 years. For every 100 females, there were 106.7 males. For every 100 females age 18 and over, there were 109.0 males.

The median income for a household in the town was $33,250, and the median income for a family was $36,346. Males had a median income of $31,389 versus $26,250 for females. The per capita income for the town was $14,801. About 6.4% of families and 12.3% of the population were below the poverty line, including 16.0% of those under age 18 and 13.3% of those age 65 or over.

== Notable people ==
- Grace Macurdy (1866–1946), educator
- Laurence Trimble (1885–1954), silent film actor, writer and director
