= James Shepherd Pike =

American journalist

James Shepherd Pike (September 8, 1811 – November 29, 1882) was an American journalist and a historian of South Carolina during the Reconstruction Era. He was born in 1811 in Calais, Maine, (then part of Massachusetts).

From 1850 to 1860 he was the chief Washington correspondent and associate editor of the New York Tribune. The Tribune was the chief source of news and commentary for many Republican newspapers across the country. Republican editors reprinted his dispatches prior to the outbreak of the American Civil War. In 1854 he led the fight against the Kansas-Nebraska Act, calling for the formation of a new political entity to oppose it. Pike wrote that a "solid phalanx of aggression rears its black head everywhere south of Mason and Dixon's line, banded for the propagation of Slavery all over the continent." His reports were, "widely quoted, bitterly attacked or enthusiastically praised; they exerted a profound influence upon public opinion and gave to their author national prominence, first as an uncompromising anti-slavery Whig, and later as an ardent Republican."

President Abraham Lincoln appointed Pike to be minister to the Netherlands, where he fought Confederate diplomatic efforts and promoted the Union war aims from 1861 to 1866. On returning to Washington in 1866, Pike returned to writing for the New York Tribune and also wrote editorials for the New York Sun.

Pike was an outspoken Radical Republican, standing with Thaddeus Stevens and Charles Sumner in opposition to President Andrew Johnson. Long before Black suffrage became a major issue Pike had come to believe that the freed slaves must be given the vote. In 1866–67, Pike strongly supported Black suffrage and the disqualification of most ex-Confederates from holding office.

Pike did not admire Ulysses S. Grant as a politician, and drifted away from the Republican party. By 1872 Pike was disenchanted with Black suffrage and what he viewed as the corruption and failures of Reconstruction. He argued the federal government should withdraw its soldiers from the Southern states. He was a strong supporter of the Liberal Republican movement that in 1872 opposed President Ulysses Grant, denouncing the corruption of his administration. Pike's boss, New York Tribune editor Horace Greeley, was the Liberal Republican nominee in 1872. Greeley lost to Grant by a landslide, then died. The new editor of the Tribune Whitelaw Reid sent Pike to South Carolina to study the conditions in the deep South under Reconstruction.

In 1873 Pike toured South Carolina and published a series of newspaper articles detailing his observations of Reconstruction era government, later compiled into the influential book The Prostrate State: South Carolina under Negro Government. Pike depicted the South Carolina legislature as corrupt, incompetent, and dominated by what he called “a mass of black barbarism,” advocating a return of political power to white elites.

== Bibliography ==
- Durden, Robert F. James Shepherd Pike. Republicanism and the American Negro, 1850–1882 (Duke University Press, 1957). ISBN 0-313-20168-4
- Durden, Robert F. "Pike, James Shepherd"; American National Biography Online February 2000
- Historian John Hope Franklin discusses Pike's work
- Franklin, John Hope. Race and History: Selected Essays 1938-1988, Baton Rouge: Louisiana State University Press, 1989.
- James M. McPherson. The Abolitionist Legacy: From Reconstruction to the NAACP (1975)
- Pike, James Shepherd, The Prostrate State: South Carolina Under Negro Government(New York, 1874). full text online at Making of America, University of Michigan; paperback edition with introduction by Durden (1974)
- Pike, James Shepherd, First Blows of the Civil War (1879), collection of Pike's Tribune editorials and political letters online edition
- Mark Wahlgren Summers, The Press Gang: Newspapers and Politics, 1865-1878 (1994)
- Van Cleve, Thomas C. "Pike, James Shepherd, (Sept. 8, 1811 - Nov. 29, 1882)" in Dictionary of American Biography (1934)
