= Calais, Maine =

City in Maine, United States

- City
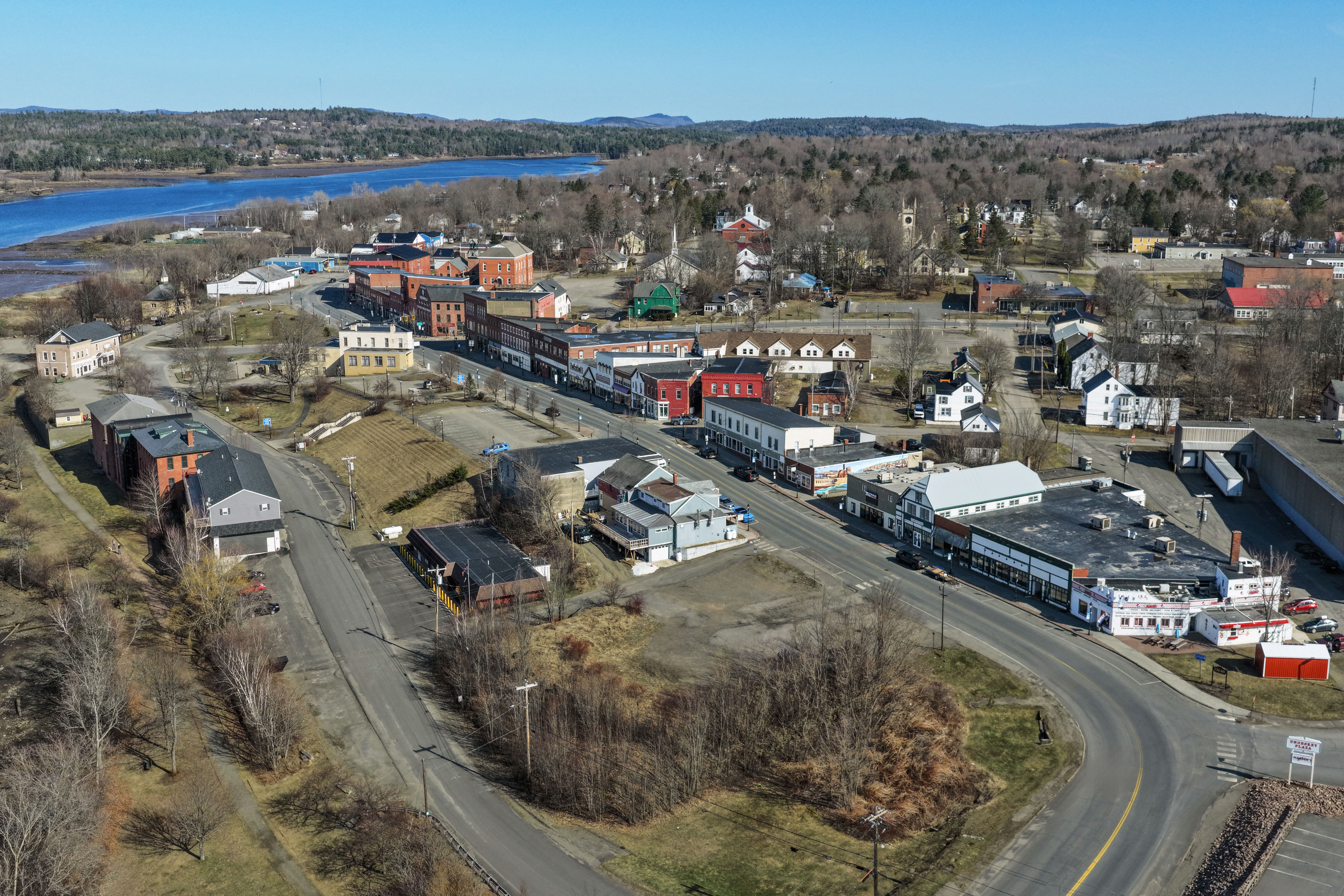
- Aerial view of Calais in 2026, with the St. Croix River in background

- Logo
- Motto: "Bridging Culture, Commerce, and Community"
- Location in Maine Location in the United States
- Coordinates: 45°11′19″N 67°16′46″W
- Country: United States
- State: Maine
- County: Washington
- Settled: 1779
- Incorporated: June 16, 1809

Area
  - Total: 40.11 sq mi (103.88 km^{2})
  - Land: 34.32 sq mi (88.90 km^{2})
  - Water: 5.78 sq mi (14.98 km^{2})
- Elevation: 315 ft (96 m)

Population (2020)
  - Total: 3,079
  - Density: 89.7/sq mi (34.64/km^{2})
- Time zone: UTC-05:00 (EST)
  - Summer (DST): UTC-04:00 (EDT)
- ZIP code: 04619
- Area code: 207
- FIPS code: 23-09585
- GNIS feature ID: 582382
- Website: www.calaismaine.org

Calais (/ˈkælɪs/; similar to the word "callous") is a city in Washington County, Maine, United States. As of the 2020 census, it had a population of 3,079, making Calais the largest municipality by population in Washington County, but the third least-populous city in Maine (after Hallowell and Eastport). The city has three Canada–US border crossings (known as ports of entry) over the St. Croix River connecting to St. Stephen, New Brunswick, Canada.

Calais was named after the city of Calais, France. It has been a city of commerce and is recognized as the primary shopping center of eastern Washington County and of Charlotte County, New Brunswick. Retail, service, and construction businesses are the primary components of the Calais economy.

== History ==
This area was occupied for thousands of years by indigenous peoples. The historic Passamaquoddy, an Algonquian-speaking people of the Wabanaki Confederacy, was predominant in this area at the time of European encounter and settlement.

The St. Croix River and its area were first explored by the French Samuel de Champlain when he and his men spent a winter on St. Croix Island in 1604. The first permanent settler was Daniel Hill of Jonesboro, who arrived in 1779 during the American Revolutionary War, when this was still part of Massachusetts. With other settlers, he built the first sawmill in 1782. On June 27, 1789, the Massachusetts General Court sold the township to Waterman Thomas for 19¢ an acre (0.4 hectares) (approx. $2.86 an acre in 2018 dollars). Early occupations in the settlement included farming, hunting and ship building.

On June 16, 1809, Plantation Number 5 PS was incorporated as Calais after Calais, France, in honor of French assistance during the American Revolution. The river provided the mill town with water power for industry, which included sawmills, clapboard and shingle mills, two planing mills, a saw factory, two axe factories and four grain mills. There were foundries, machine shops, granite works, shoe factories and a tannery. Other businesses produced bricks, bedsteads, brooms, carriages and plaster.

The relationship between Calais and the neighboring Canadian town of St. Stephen has been remarkably close, over a period of many years. As evidence of the longtime friendship between the towns a likely apocryphal story is told that during the War of 1812, the British military provided St. Stephen with a large supply of gunpowder for protection against the enemy Americans in Calais, but St. Stephen's town elders gave the gunpowder to Calais for its Fourth of July celebrations.

During the War of 1812, the United States and British North America agreed to a ceasefire on the border between St. Stephen and Calais, as "a collision between those whose dwellings are within gunshot of each other would have produced the most unhappy consequences...and the authorities effectually restrained the violence that sometimes springs from rash and intemperate men."

Calais is the home of the first railroad built in the state of Maine, the Calais Railroad, incorporated by the state legislature on February 17, 1832. It was built to transport lumber from a mill on the St. Croix River opposite Milltown, New Brunswick, 2 miles (3 km) to the tidewater at Calais in 1835. In 1849, the name was changed to the Calais & Baring Railroad, and the line was extended 4 miles (6 km) farther to Baring. In 1870, it became part of the St. Croix & Penobscot Railroad.

Calais was incorporated as a city on August 24, 1850. On July 18, 1864, Confederate agents crossed the border from New Brunswick and attempted to rob a bank in Calais.

The Calais Free Library was designed by Boston architect Arthur H. Vinal and opened on July 4, 1893. The Romanesque Revival building was listed on the National Register of Historic Places in 2001.

Other places in Calais listed on the National Register of Historic Places are the Calais Historic District, Calais Residential Historic District, Devils Head Site, Gilmore House, Thomas Hamilton House, Hinckley Hill Historic District, Holmes Cottage, Dr. Job Holmes House, Theodore Jellison House, Pike's Mile Markers, St. Anne's Episcopal Church, George Washburn House and Whitlocks Mill Light.

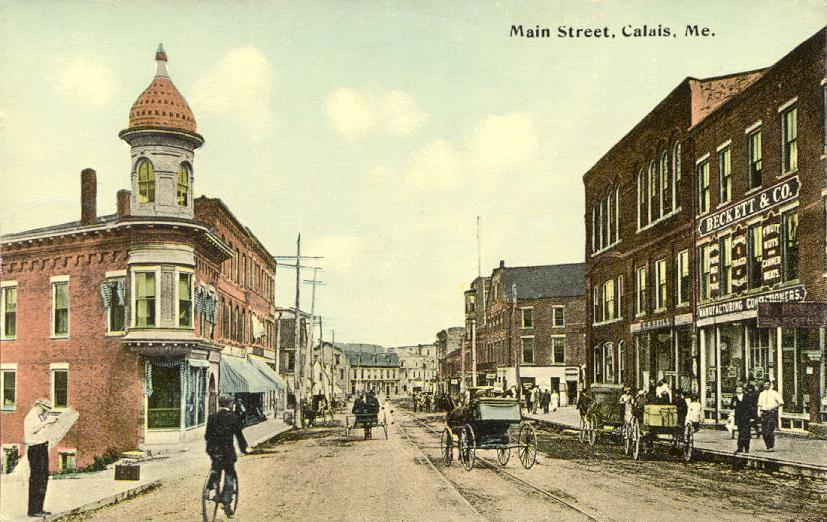
Main Street in 1913

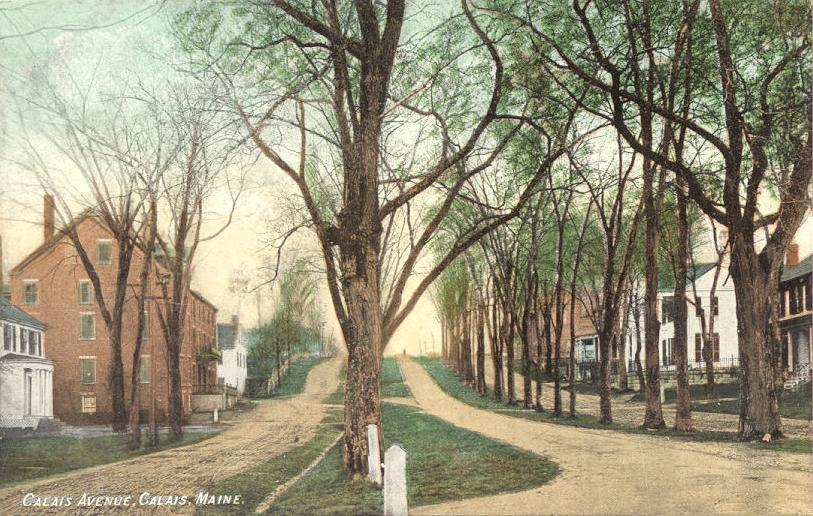
Calais Avenue c. 1905

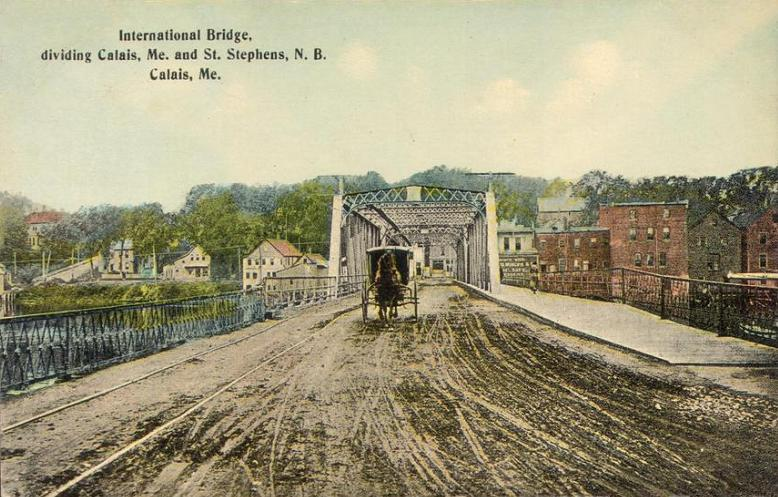
International Bridge in 1913

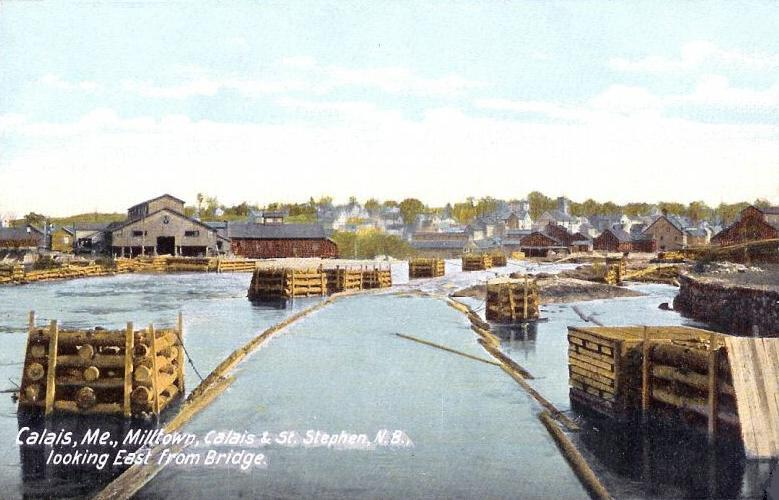
Looking east from bridge in 1908

== Geography ==
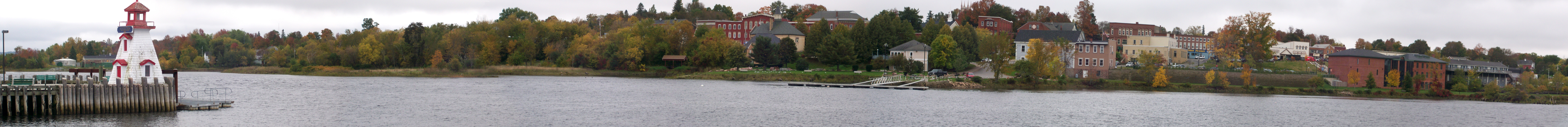
Calais viewed from St. Stephen across the St. Croix River

According to the United States Census Bureau, the city has a total area of 40.10 square miles (103.86 km^{2}), of which 34.32 square miles (88.89 km^{2}) is land and 5.78 square miles (14.97 km^{2}) is water. Calais is located at the head of tide on the St. Croix River.

Recently, the City of Calais acquired Devil's Head. The site comprises 318 acres (129 ha) of land, 1-mile (1.6 km) of frontage on the St. Croix River estuary, and 0.6 miles (0.97 km) of frontage on U.S. Route 1. Significant features on the property include a 340-foot (100 m) high granite headland towering over the estuary, a low-tide sand and boulder beach, upland forest, and abundant wildlife. Trail construction was completed in 2003.

Calais is the northern terminus of the East Coast Greenway, which has its southern terminus in Key West, Florida.

== Demographics ==
Historical population
| Census | Pop. | Note | %± |
|---|---|---|---|
| 1810 | 372 | | — |
| 1820 | 418 | | 12.4% |
| 1830 | 1,686 | | 303.3% |
| 1840 | 2,934 | | 74.0% |
| 1850 | 4,749 | | 61.9% |
| 1860 | 5,621 | | 18.4% |
| 1870 | 5,944 | | 5.7% |
| 1880 | 6,173 | | 3.9% |
| 1890 | 7,290 | | 18.1% |
| 1900 | 7,655 | | 5.0% |
| 1910 | 6,116 | | −20.1% |
| 1920 | 6,084 | | −0.5% |
| 1930 | 5,470 | | −10.1% |
| 1940 | 5,161 | | −5.6% |
| 1950 | 4,589 | | −11.1% |
| 1960 | 4,223 | | −8.0% |
| 1970 | 4,044 | | −4.2% |
| 1980 | 4,262 | | 5.4% |
| 1990 | 3,963 | | −7.0% |
| 2000 | 3,447 | | −13.0% |
| 2010 | 3,123 | | −9.4% |
| 2020 | 3,079 | | −1.4% |

=== 2020 census ===
As of the 2020 census, Calais had a population of 3,079. The median age was 45.1 years. 18.4% of residents were under the age of 18 and 24.7% of residents were 65 years of age or older. For every 100 females there were 95.1 males, and for every 100 females age 18 and over there were 91.0 males age 18 and over.

0.0% of residents lived in urban areas, while 100.0% lived in rural areas.

There were 1,354 households in Calais, of which 24.2% had children under the age of 18 living in them. Of all households, 37.7% were married-couple households, 20.5% were households with a male householder and no spouse or partner present, and 33.5% were households with a female householder and no spouse or partner present. About 38.3% of all households were made up of individuals and 19.3% had someone living alone who was 65 years of age or older.

There were 1,701 housing units, of which 20.4% were vacant. The homeowner vacancy rate was 4.5% and the rental vacancy rate was 8.5%.

Racial composition as of the 2020 census
| Race | Number | Percent |
|---|---|---|
| White | 2,850 | 92.6% |
| Black or African American | 11 | 0.4% |
| American Indian and Alaska Native | 53 | 1.7% |
| Asian | 20 | 0.6% |
| Native Hawaiian and Other Pacific Islander | 0 | 0.0% |
| Some other race | 14 | 0.5% |
| Two or more races | 131 | 4.3% |
| Hispanic or Latino (of any race) | 55 | 1.8% |

=== 2010 census ===
As of the census of 2010, there were 3,123 people, 1,403 households, and 771 families residing in the city. The population density was 91.0 inhabitants per square mile (35.1/km^{2}). There were 1,737 housing units at an average density of 50.6 per square mile (19.5/km^{2}). The racial makeup of the city was 95.5% White, 0.5% African American, 1.3% Native American, 0.6% Asian, 0.4% from other races, and 1.7% from two or more races. Hispanic or Latino of any race were 1.4% of the population.

There were 1,403 households, of which 25.3% had children under the age of 18 living with them, 38.8% were married couples living together, 11.2% had a female householder with no husband present, 4.9% had a male householder with no wife present, and 45.0% were non-families. 39.9% of all households were made up of individuals, and 20.3% had someone living alone who was 65 years of age or older. The average household size was 2.12 and the average family size was 2.80.

The median age in the city was 45.3 years. 19.7% of residents were under the age of 18; 9.9% were between the ages of 18 and 24; 20% were from 25 to 44; 29.9% were from 45 to 64; and 20.5% were 65 years of age or older. The gender makeup of the city was 48.3% male and 51.7% female.

== Government ==
The City of Calais operates under the council-manager form of government. The current city manager is Michael Ellis. Some past city managers include: William Bridgeo, Nancy Orr, Nicholas Mull, Linda Pagels, Mark Ryckman, Diane Barnes and James Porter. The current city mayor is Marcia Rogers.

== Education ==
=== Public schools ===
Calais is a part of the Calais School District. It has an elementary school, a middle school, a high school, and a technical school.

- Calais High School
- St. Croix Regional Technical School

Calais also has the superintendent's office of the Maine Indian Education (MIE) school system, a public school system for Native Americans in three other communities.

=== Higher education ===
Calais is home to a two-year community college. The nearest four-year university is located in Machias, Maine.

- Washington County Community College

== Infrastructure ==
=== Transportation ===
Calais is located at the junction of U.S. 1, a major north-south highway that runs along the Eastern Seaboard, and Route 9, which crosses the state from east to west. Since October 25, 2012, the city also has had direct access to New Brunswick Route 1, a controlled-access freeway that begins at the Canada–US border and runs east through Saint John to a junction with the Trans-Canada Highway. West's Bus Service operates a bus service between Calais and Bangor.

=== Healthcare ===
Calais Regional Hospital (CRH) currently has 15 acute care beds and 10 swing beds, in addition to a 24-hour physician staffed emergency department. It serves northeastern Washington County with an approximate population of 14,000 from Topsfield to the north, Wesley to the west, and Eastport to the south. CRH is the largest employer in Calais, employing more than 200 people. The hospital is licensed by the State of Maine.

- Calais Regional Hospital

=== Public safety ===
Calais has a full-time police, fire, and EMS department.

== Notable people ==
- Nehemiah Abbott, US congressman
- Lyn Mikel Brown, academic, author
- Ron Corning, television anchorman
- Edwin Grant Dexter, educator
- Thomas Fuller, US congressman
- Andrea Gibson, spoken word artist, poet, activist
- Elijah Dix Green, merchant and founder of Calais' Second Baptist Church
- Roger Lyndon, mathematician
- Anne C. Perry, politician
- Frederick A. Pike, US congressman
- James Shepherd Pike, journalist
- Mary Newmarch Prescott, magazine writer and poet
- Henry Milner Rideout, author
- Tim Sample, humorist
- Harriet Prescott Spofford, author
- Ellen Smith Tupper, beekeeper, editor
- Amos Parker Wilder, journalist and diplomat
- Horatio Nelson Young, naval hero

== International border crossings ==
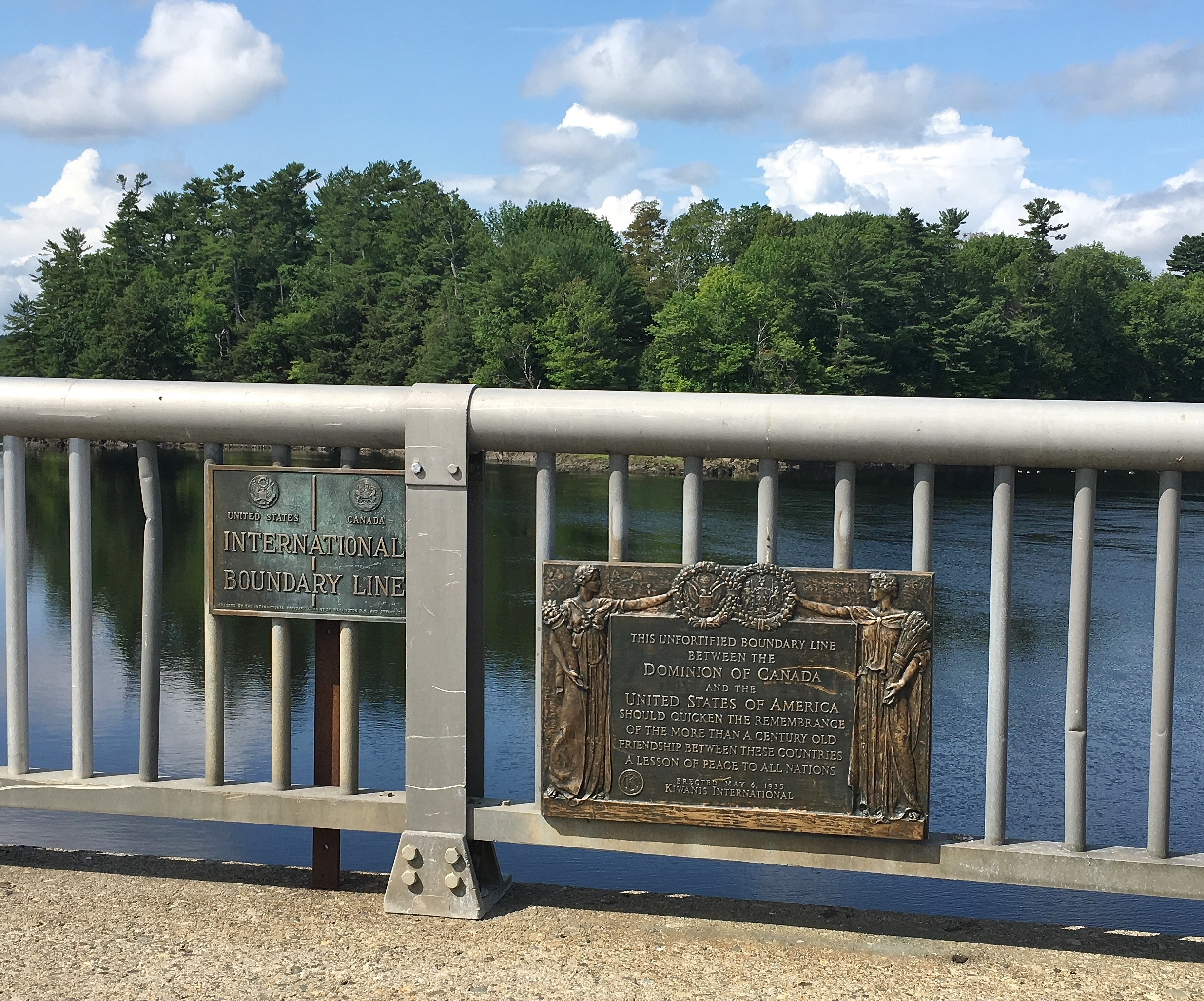
Sign at the international border between Calais, Maine, United States (left) and St. Stephen, New Brunswick, Canada (right)

The Ferry Point International Bridge and the Milltown International Bridge connect Calais to St. Stephen, New Brunswick, Canada. Construction began in 2008 on a third bridge and Port of entry (POE) to connect the two communities. Referred to as the International Avenue Bridge, this bridge and POE opened on November 16, 2009, and serves commercial, cargo, trucking, passenger vehicles, campers, RVs, and buses. However, both the Ferry Point and Milltown crossings remain in use for passenger vehicles and pedestrians.

The new inspection facility alleviates traffic congestion from downtown Calais and the neighboring towns in Canada. It is equipped with state-of-the-art security equipment that allows for efficient processing of both commercial and passenger vehicles. The new facility is occupied by U.S. Customs and Border Protection (CBP), the U.S. Food and Drug Administration (FDA) and U.S. General Services Administration (GSA). This facility was built as part of GSA's high-performance green building program and has received the Leadership in Energy and Environmental Design (LEED) Gold certification for comprehensive use of sustainable design and technology. Recycled, reused, and local materials were used during the construction. The facility conserves energy by bringing natural light into every occupied space, and conserves water by using low-flow fixtures that consumes 40 percent less water than traditional plumbing. The Calais port of entry, designed by Robert Siegel Architects, provides six lanes of non-commercial inspection and three lanes of commercial inspection.

== Sites of interest ==
- St. Anne's Episcopal Church
- Milltown Dam
- Whitlocks Mill Light
- Calais Observatory
- Devils Head Site
