= Campbell House =

Campbell House, or The Campbell House or variations, may refer to:

== In Canada ==
- Campbell House (Toronto, Canada)

== In the United States ==
- Campbell House (Palmer, Alaska), in Matanuska-Susitna Borough
- Campbell-Chrisp House, Bald Knob, Arkansas
- Wilson-Pittman-Campbell-Gregory House, Fayetteville, Arkansas, in Washington County
- Campbell House (Forrest City, Arkansas), in St. Francis County
- Campbell House (Rogers, Arkansas), in Benton County
- Campbell House (Denver, Colorado), a Denver Landmark
- Campbell House (Okahumpka, Florida)
- Campbell-Jordan House, Washington, Georgia
- Albert Campbell House, Highland Park, Illinois
- Leander Campbell House, Danville, Indiana, in Hendricks County
- Henry F. Campbell Mansion, Indianapolis, Indiana, in Marion County
- B. H. Campbell House, Wichita, Kansas
- Campbell House (Hopkinsville, Kentucky), listed on the NRHP in Christian County
- Campbell House (Lexington, Kentucky), or "The Campbell House", a historic hotel
- Campbell House (Paint Lick, Kentucky), listed on the NRHP in Madison County
- David C. Campbell House, Plum Springs, Kentucky, listed on the NRHP in Warren County
- William Campbell House (Stamping Ground, Kentucky)
- Sheriff Eugene P. Campbell House, Vidalia, Louisiana, listed on the NRHP in Concordia Parish
- David W. Campbell House, Cherryfield, Maine, in Washington County
- Frank Campbell House, Cherryfield, Maine, in Washington County, Maine
- Gen. Alexander Campbell House, Cherryfield, Maine
- Col. Samuel Campbell House, Cherryfield, Maine, in Washington County, Maine
- Collen C. Campbell House, Barnstable, Massachusetts
- Calvin A. and Alta Koch Campbell House, Midland, Michigan, in Midland County
- Ticknor-Campbell House, Ann Arbor, Michigan, in Washtenaw County
- William H. and Alma Downer Campbell House, Wabasha, Minnesota, in Wabasha County
- Overfelt-Campbell-Johnston House, Independence, Missouri, listed on the NRHP in Atchison County
- Thompson-Campbell Farmstead, Langdon, Missouri, in Atchison County
- Campbell House Museum, St. Louis, Missouri, listed as the "Robert G. Campbell House"
- Campbell-Christie House, River Edge, New Jersey
- Campbell-Rumsey House, Bath, New York
- Campbell-Whittlesey House, Rochester, New York
- Dr. Cornelius Nase Campbell House, Stanfordville, New York
- Harriet Campbell-Taylor House, Westfield, New York
- James Archibald Campbell House, Buies Creek, North Carolina, in Harnett County
- Morrison-Campbell House, Harmony, North Carolina, in Iredell County
- Perciphull Campbell House, Union Grove, North Carolina, in Iredell County
- Thomas D. Campbell House, Grand Forks, North Dakota
- Johnson-Campbell House, Columbus, Ohio
- Hugh Campbell House, Harrison, Ohio
- Richard Posey Campbell House, Ashland, Oregon, listed on the NRHP in Jackson County
- Hamilton Campbell House, Jefferson, Oregon, listed on the NRHP in Marion County
- McDougall–Campbell House, Portland, Oregon
- Robert E. Campbell House, Springfield, Oregon
- Stephenson-Campbell House, Cecil, Pennsylvania
- Gina Smith Campbell Bathhouse, Dell Rapids, South Dakota
- Gen. Charles T. Campbell House, Scotland, South Dakota, listed on the NRHP in Bon Homme County
- Joseph A. Campbell House, Collierville, Tennessee, listed on the NRHP in Shelby County
- William S. Campbell House, Franklin, Tennessee
- Bowen-Campbell House, Goodlettsville, Tennessee
- Dr. John Owen Campbell House, Lebanon, Tennessee, in Wilson County
- Alexander-Campbell House, Abilene, Texas, listed on the NRHP in Taylor County
- William Campbell House (Park City, Utah), in Summit County
- Campbell House (Lexington, Virginia)
- Campbell House (Spokane, Washington)
- Alexander Campbell Mansion, Bethany, West Virginia
- Campbell-Hicks House, Huntington, West Virginia
- Clarence Campbell House, Union, West Virginia
- John G. Campbell House, Oconto, Wisconsin, listed on the NRHP in Oconto County

== See also ==
- Campbell Farm (disambiguation)
- William Campbell House (disambiguation)
