= William Campbell House =

William Campbell House may refer to:

- William Campbell House (Stamping Ground, Kentucky), listed on the National Register of Historic Places (NRHP)
- William S. Campbell House, Franklin, Tennessee, NRHP-listed
- William H. and Alma Downer Campbell House, Wabasha, Minnesota, in Wabasha County, NRHP-listed
- William Campbell House (Park City, Utah), NRHP-listed

== See also ==
- Campbell House (disambiguation)
