= Archibald-Adams House =

Historic house in Maine, United States

- U.S. National Register of Historic Places
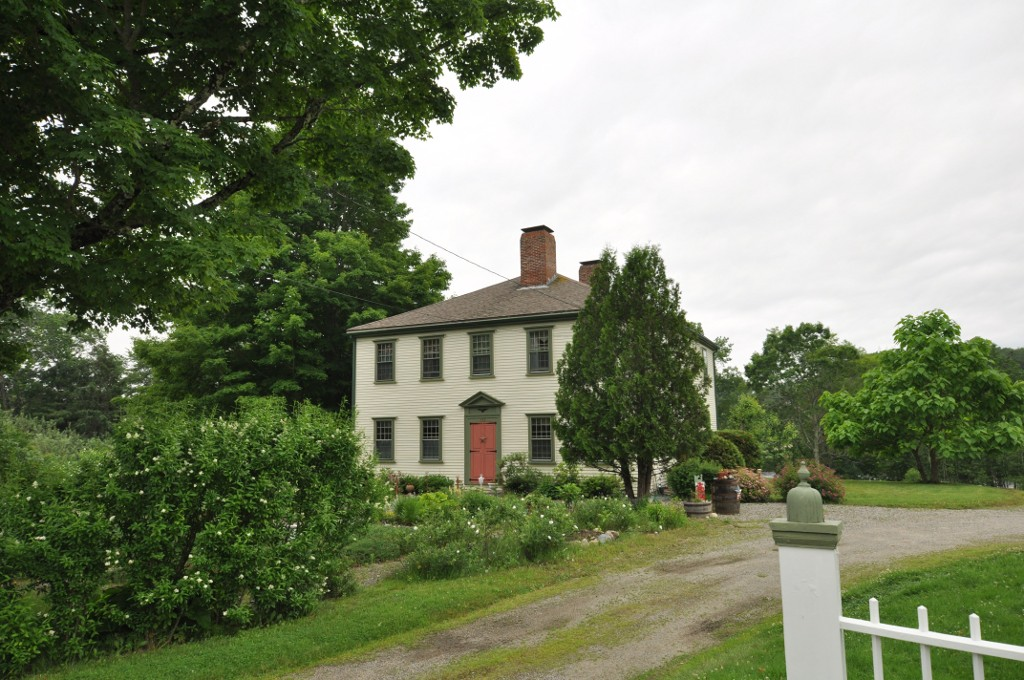

- Location within Maine Location within the United States
- Location: 122 Main Street (ME 193), Cherryfield, Maine
- Coordinates: 44°36′21″N 67°55′38″W
- Area: 1.3 acres (0.53 ha)
- Built: 1795
- Architectural style: Federal
- NRHP reference No.: 87000429
- Added to NRHP: March 13, 1987

The Archibald-Adams House is a historic house at 122 Main Street (Maine State Route 193) in Cherryfield, Maine, United States. Built about 1795, it is one of the town's oldest surviving buildings, with associations to two prominent local families. It is now the Englishmans Bed and Breakfast, and is listed on the National Register of Historic Places.

== Description and history ==
The Archibald-Adams House is set on the west side of Main Street (between it and the Narraguagus River) a short way north of the village center of Cherryfield. It is a two-story wood-frame structure, with a hip roof, clapboard siding, and a granite foundation. A pair of brick chimneys rise from the interior of the house. The house has prominent facades facing both east, toward the road, and south, toward the village. Both of these facades are five bays wide, with a center entrance that has a distinctive surround. The south facade entry has flanking sidelight windows and pilasters, and is topped by a transom window and entablature, all in the Greek Revival style. The eastern entry has a simpler treatment, with no windows and an entablature with gabled pediment. The interior has retained much of its original late 19th-century woodwork and hardware.

The house was built about 1795, probably by Thomas Archibald, who held a number of local civic offices between about 1790 and 1810. Archibald's daughter Elizabeth married Joseph Adams, who remarried into the locally prominent Campbell family after her untimely death in 1811. Adams was also prominent in civic affairs, serving as a justice of the peace, town selectman, and as a trustee of the Cherryfield Academy. The house remained in the Adams family for several generations.

== See also ==
- National Register of Historic Places listings in Washington County, Maine
