= Col. Samuel Campbell House =

Historic house in Maine, United States

- U.S. National Register of Historic Places
- U.S. Historic district – Contributing property
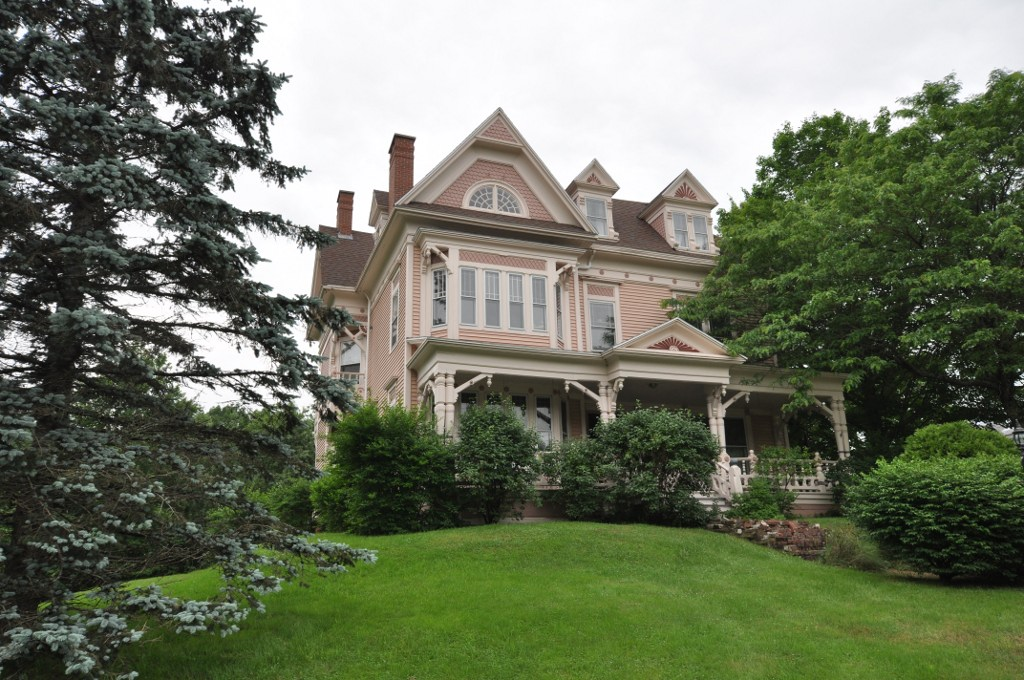

- Location within Maine Location within the United States
- Location: U.S. 1, Cherryfield, Maine
- Coordinates: 44°35′54″N 67°55′18″W
- Area: 0.5 acres (0.20 ha)
- Built: 1883
- Architectural style: Queen Anne
- Part of: Cherryfield Historic District (ID90001467)
- NRHP reference No.: 82000785

Significant dates
- Added to NRHP: February 4, 1982
- Designated CP: October 1, 1990

The Col. Samuel Campbell House is a historic house on United States Route 1 in the village center of Cherryfield, Maine. Built in 1883, it is one of the finest examples of Queen Anne Victorian architecture in eastern Maine. The house was listed on the National Register of Historic Places in 1982, and is a contributing element of the 1990 Cherryfield Historic District.

== Description and history ==
The Samuel Campbell House is located on the north side of US 1, on the eastern side of Cherryfield village, just west of the Gen. Alexander Campbell House and northeast of the Frank Campbell House. It is a large and rambling 2 1/2-story wood-frame structure, with a richly decorated and varied exterior typical of the Queen Anne period. The front facade faces south, and has a single-story porch extending across its full width, supported by grouped turned columns, with brackets and a turned balustrade. The entry stairs are set under a projecting gable section. A broad polygonal bay rises two stories to the left of the entrance, topped by a projecting pedimented gable. An ell extends the house to the north, joining it to a period carriage house with ventilated cupola.

The house was built in 1883 for Col. Samuel Campbell, the grandson of General Alexander Campbell whose house stands adjacent. Campbell continued his ancestor's history of economic and civic leadership in the community, operating lumber businesses in the Narraguagus River valley, and serving on the Governor's Council from 1880 to 1882. The house modified in 1889 with the addition of bay windows designed by local architect Charles A. Allen, who designed a number of Cherryfield's high-style houses.

== See also ==
- National Register of Historic Places listings in Washington County, Maine
