= Patten Building =

- U.S. National Register of Historic Places
- U.S. Historic district – Contributing property
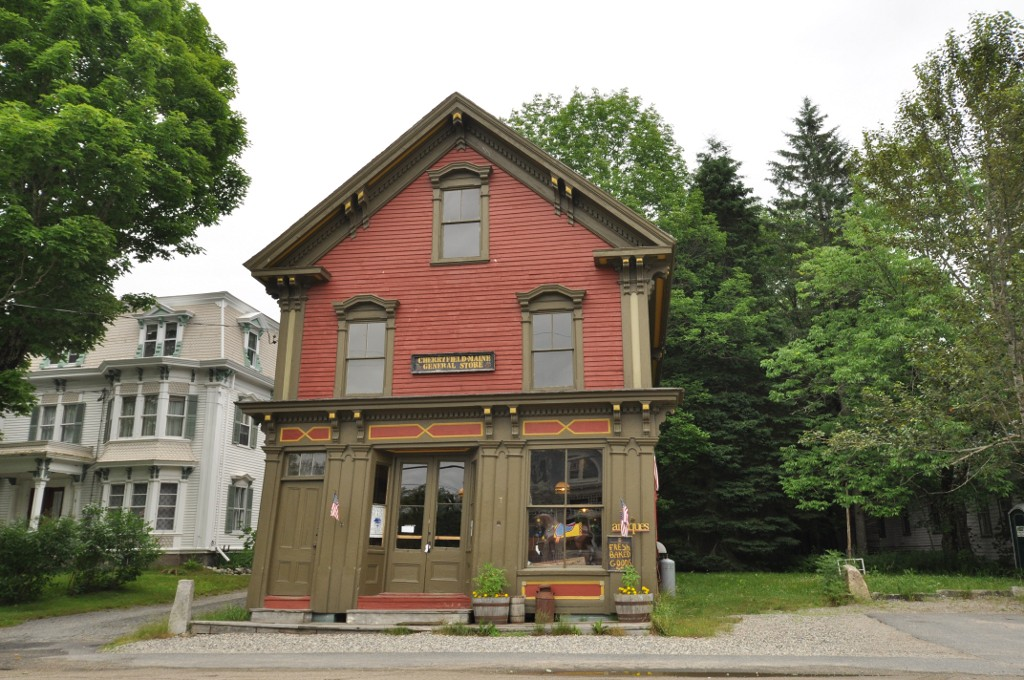

- Location within Maine Location within the United States
- Location: Main St., Cherryfield, Maine
- Coordinates: 44°35′54″N 67°55′30″W
- Area: 0.5 acres (0.20 ha)
- Built: 1865
- Architect: Patten, Francis W.
- Architectural style: Italianate
- Part of: Cherryfield Historic District (ID90001467)
- NRHP reference No.: 78000207

Significant dates
- Added to NRHP: December 22, 1978
- Designated CP: October 1, 1990

The Patten Building is a historic commercial building on Main Street in Cherryfield, Maine. Built in 1865, it is a fine example of commercial Italianate architecture, and has long been a landmark retail site in the small community.

== Description and history ==
The Patten Building is located in the center of Cherryfield village, on the east side of Main Street (Maine State Route 193), a short way north of its junction with United States Route 1. It is a 2 1/2-story, wood-framed structure, with a front-facing gabled roof and clapboard siding. The roof has an extended cornice, with paired brackets and dentil moulding. The first floor of the front facade is divided into three parts, with a storefront consisting of a double door on the left and a display window on the right, occupying the two right bays, and a single door providing access to the upstairs in the left bay. The bays are each flanked by pilasters, and are topped by decorative wood panels separated by brackets. A dentillated cornice separates the first and second floors. The second floor has paneled pilasters at the corners, and two windows with carved bracketed lintels, while the attic level has a single window with similar treatment.

The building was erected in 1865 by Frank Patten, who was engaged in the manufacture and sale of boots and shoes. The building has also served in a variety of other commercial roles, including barbershop and meat market. The building is a regionally uncommon example of commercial Italianate architecture, and is now owned by the local historical society.

It was listed on the National Register of Historic Places on December 22, 1978.

== See also ==
- National Register of Historic Places listings in Washington County, Maine
