= William M. Nash House =

Historic house in Maine, United States

- U.S. National Register of Historic Places
- U.S. Historic district – Contributing property
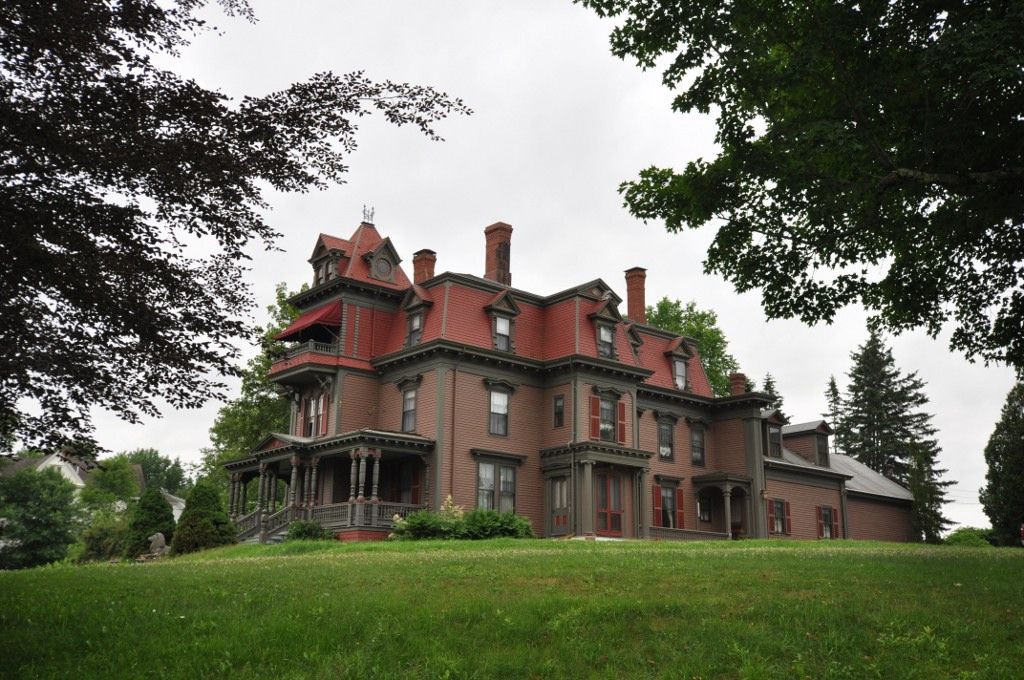

- Location within Maine Location within the United States
- Location: River Rd., Cherryfield, Maine
- Coordinates: 44°36′2″N 67°55′42″W
- Area: 0.5 acres (0.20 ha)
- Built: 1888
- Architect: Allen, William A.
- Architectural style: Greek Revival, Queen Anne
- Part of: Cherryfield Historic District (ID90001467)
- NRHP reference No.: 83000477

Significant dates
- Added to NRHP: January 4, 1983
- Designated CP: October 1, 1990

The William M. Nash House is a historic house on River Road in Cherryfield, Maine. It is a multiply-altered and renovated structure, now presented as an elaborately decorated 1888 Second Empire house. This design was one of Cherryfield native William A. Allen's most imaginative designs. It was listed on the National Register of Historic Places in 1983, and is a contributing property to the Cherryfield Historic District. The property is owned by Gordon and Cynthia Kelley.

== Description and history ==
The Nash House is set at the junction of River Road and School Street on the west side of the Narraguagus River, opposite the central portion of Cherryfield village. It is a large and rambling 2 1/2-story wood-frame structure, with a mansard roof providing a full third floor. Its front facade is three bays wide, with a three-story hip-roofed tower projecting from the center. A single-story porch extends across the front, with turned posts and a modillioned entablature. A balcony projects from the front of the tower on the second level.

The earliest date of construction of surviving portions of this house are not known. It was originally a 1 1/2-story Cape style house, which was converted by James Moore into a Greek Revival structure with a classical temple front. Moore son-in-law, William Nash, inherited that house, and retained local architect William Allen to update it in 1888 to the Second Empire style. It is not known if any portion of the original Cape survived both transformations of the house. Of Allen's works (which are predominantly to be seen elsewhere in Cherryfield), it is the most elaborate known.

== See also ==
- National Register of Historic Places listings in Washington County, Maine
