= David W. Campbell House =

Historic house in Maine, United States

- U.S. National Register of Historic Places
- U.S. Historic district – Contributing property
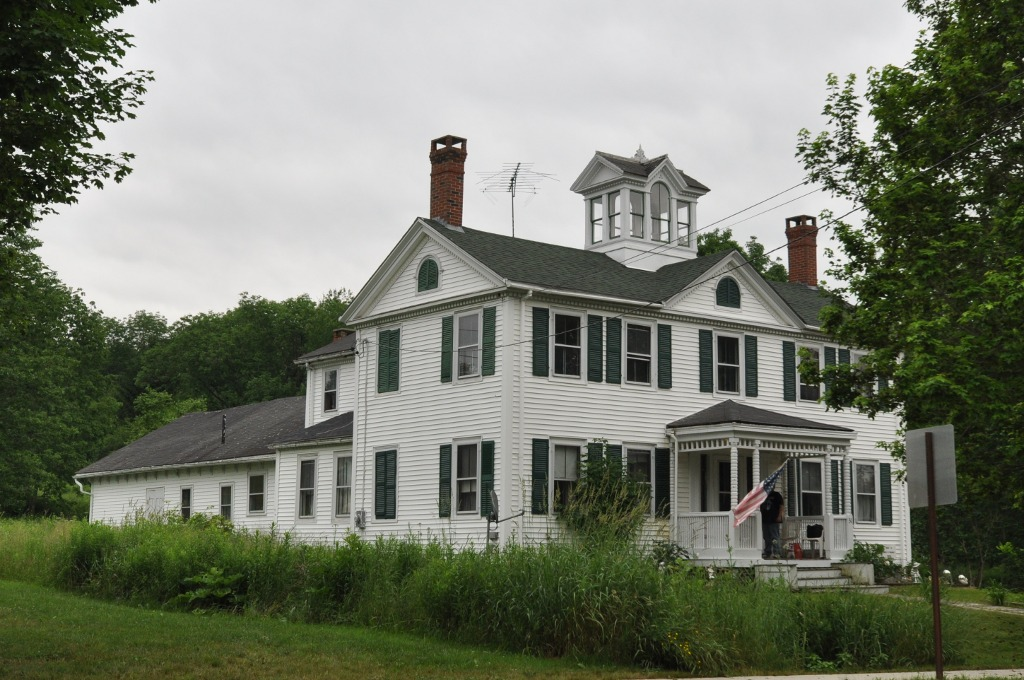

- Location within Maine Location within the United States
- Location: Main St., Cherryfield, Maine
- Coordinates: 44°36′2″N 67°55′19″W
- Area: 0.3 acres (0.12 ha)
- Built: 1828
- Built by: David W. Campbell
- Architectural style: Italianate, Federal
- Part of: Cherryfield Historic District (ID90001467)
- NRHP reference No.: 84001545

Significant dates
- Added to NRHP: July 19, 1984
- Designated CP: October 1, 1990

The David W. Campbell House is a historic house on Main Street in Cherryfield, Maine. Built in 1828 as a Federal-style structure, it was altered in the mid-19th century to include a significant number of Italianate features. Built by a member of the locally prominent Campbell family, it was listed on the National Register of Historic Places in 1990 for its architectural significance, and is a contributing member of the 1990 Cherryfield Historic District.

== Description and history ==
The Campbell House is set on the east side of Main Street, just south of the public library. The main block is a 2 1/2-story wood-frame structure, five bays wide, with a side-gable roof that has a center gable at the front, twin end chimneys, and a square cupola. A long series of ells lengthen the house to the rear (east). Most of the house is finished in wood clapboards; the front is finished in flushboard. The entrance is centered on the western facade, sheltered by a hip-roof porch with turned posts and a spindled frieze. The front and side gables are fully pedimented, with round-arch windows within the field. A porch on the south side features Italianate brackets and chambered posts. The interior retains a significant amount of Federal period woodwork, but the dining room was clearly updated in the mid-19th century.

The main block was built in 1828 by David W. Campbell, a descendant of General Alexander Campbell, a prominent local citizen during the American Revolutionary War. The ells and much of the Italianate styling were added in the mid-19th century, and the front porch, whose styling is more Queen Anne, was probably added in the late 19th century.

== See also ==
- National Register of Historic Places listings in Washington County, Maine
