= Cherryfield Academy =

- U.S. National Register of Historic Places
- U.S. Historic district – Contributing property
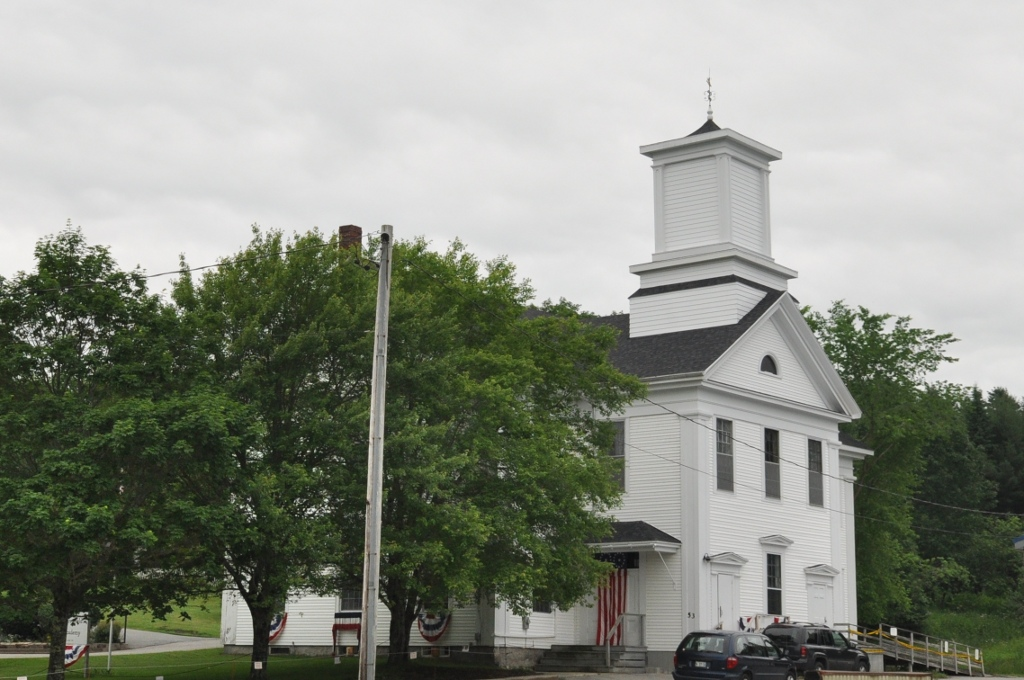

- Location within Maine Location within the United States
- Location: Main St., Cherryfield, Maine
- Coordinates: 44°36′6″N 67°55′29″W
- Area: 0.5 acres (0.20 ha)
- Built: 1850
- Architectural style: Greek Revival
- Part of: Cherryfield Historic District (ID90001467)
- NRHP reference No.: 82000786

Significant dates
- Added to NRHP: February 19, 1982
- Designated CP: October 1, 1990

The Cherryfield Academy is a historic academic and municipal building on Main Street in Cherryfield, Maine. A large Greek Revival building, it was built in 1850 to house a private academy and town offices. The academy operated until 1964, after which municipal facilities took over the remaining space. The building was listed on the National Register of Historic Places in 1982.

== Description and history ==
The Cherryfield Academy building is located on the east side of Main Street in the center of Cherryfield. It is a 2-1/2 story wood frame structure, with a T-shaped cross-gable layout, end chimneys, and granite foundation. Its main facade faces south, and has the projecting leg of the T, which is a three-bay section topped by a square belfry. The section has a pair of entrances on the front, and further entrances on each side of the projection. The building's corners are pilasters, and most of its walls are finished in clapboard; the east and west ends are finished in matchboard.

The Cherryfield Academy was a private school established in 1829. In 1850 a school district was formed to provide it with a permanent home, which resulted in the construction of this building. From the start it housed municipal offices on the ground floor, while the upstairs was used by the school. For twenty years (1875–95) the academy was operated as a free high school, accepting all area students, but returned to private status. It closed in 1965, following the construction of a regional high school. In addition to municipal offices, the building now also houses the town library and a community center.

== See also ==
- National Register of Historic Places listings in Washington County, Maine
