= Campbell Farm =

Campbell Farm or Campbell Farm Site may refer to:

(by state, then town/city)

- Brown-Chenault House, also known as "Campbell Farm", NRHP-listed in Sumner County, Tennessee
- Campbell Farm Site (Campbell, Michigan), listed on the National Register of Historic Places (NRHP) in Cheboygan County
- Campbell-De Young Farm, Elmwood Charter Township, Michigan, listed on the NRHP in Leelanau County
- Thompson-Campbell Farmstead, Langdon, Missouri, listed on the NRHP in Atchison County
- Campbell Farm (Edinburg, Virginia), listed on the NRHP in Shenandoah County

== See also ==
- Campbell House (disambiguation)
