= Campbell House (Rogers, Arkansas) =

Historic house in Arkansas, United States

- U.S. National Register of Historic Places
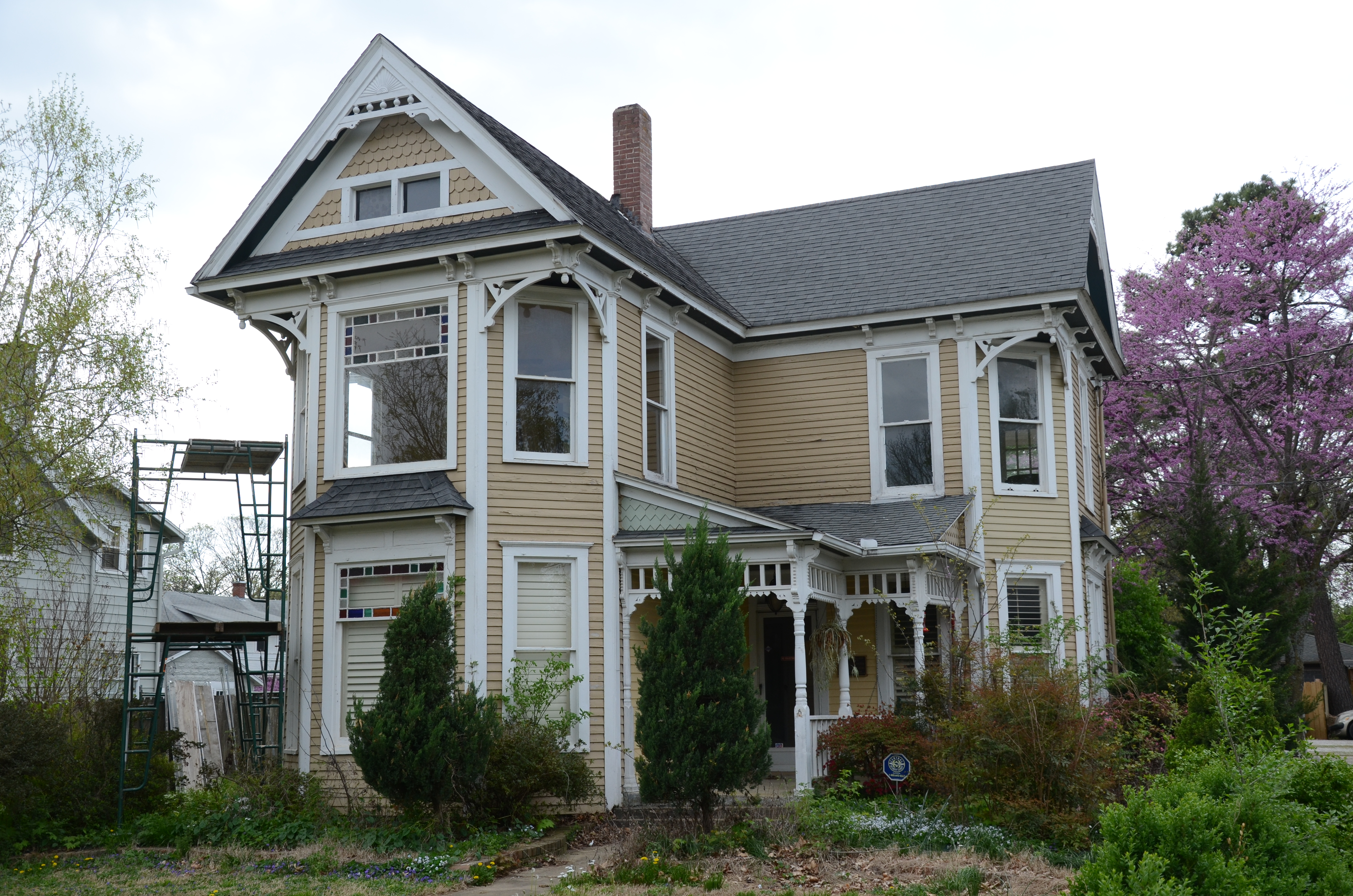

- Location within Arkansas Location within the United States
- Location: 714 W. Third St., Rogers, Arkansas
- Coordinates: 36°19′38″N 94°7′10″W
- Area: less than one acre
- Built: 1893
- Architectural style: Stick/eastlake
- MPS: Benton County MRA
- NRHP reference No.: 87002391
- Added to NRHP: January 28, 1988

The Campbell House is a historic house at 714 West Third Street in Rogers, Arkansas. It is a two-story L-shaped wood-frame structure with clapboard siding. Its corners are beveled, with overhanging gable corners above, and decorative woodwork in the gable ends above. The entry porch, in the crook of the L, is supported by turned columns with a spindled latticework frieze. The house is a fine local example of Eastlake architecture.

The house was listed on the National Register of Historic Places in 1988.

== See also ==
- National Register of Historic Places listings in Benton County, Arkansas
