= Gen. Alexander Campbell House =

Historic house in Maine, United States

- U.S. National Register of Historic Places
- U.S. Historic district – Contributing property
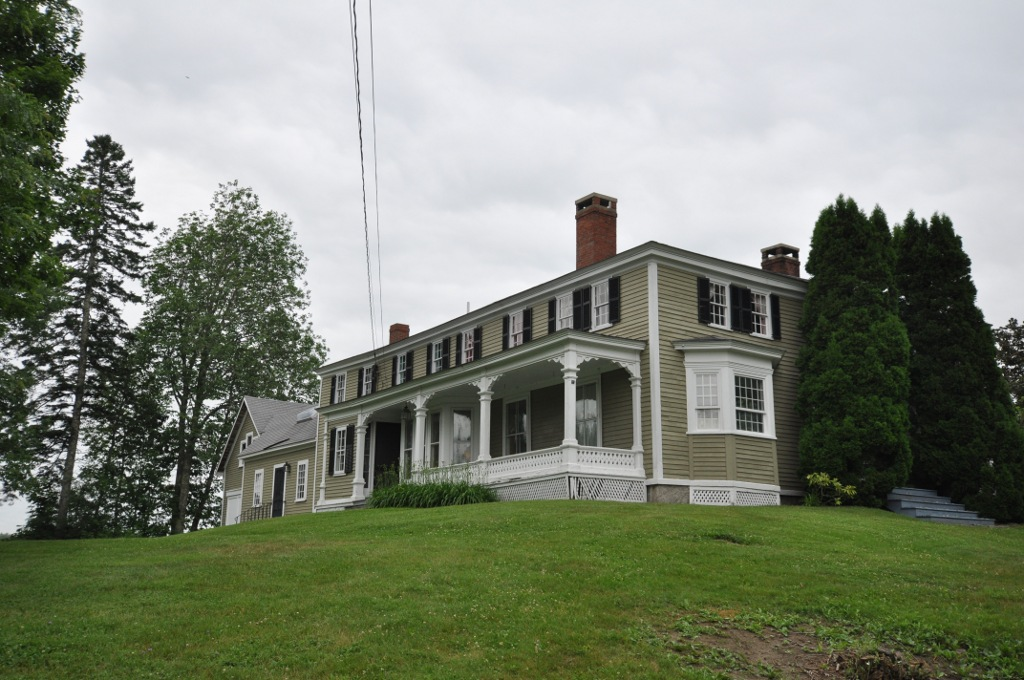

- Location within Maine Location within the United States
- Location: Campbell Hill (US 1), Cherryfield, Maine
- Coordinates: 44°35′53″N 67°55′18″W
- Area: 1 acre (0.40 ha)
- Built: 1790
- Part of: Cherryfield Historic District (ID90001467)
- NRHP reference No.: 77000088

Significant dates
- Added to NRHP: April 13, 1977
- Designated CP: October 1, 1990

The Gen. Alexander Campbell House is a historic house on United States Route 1 in Cherryfield, Maine. Built in 1790, the originally Federal-style house underwent a number of alterations in 19th century, and now has a somewhat Victorian appearance. The house is notable for being built by Alexander Campbell, a leading figure of Down East Maine during the American Revolutionary War and the subsequent decades. The house was listed on the National Register of Historic Places in 1977, and is a contributing element of the Cherryfield Historic District.

== Description and history ==
The General Alexander Campbell House is located on the north side of United States Route 1, near the eastern end of the village of Cherryfield, atop the village's highest point. It is an L-shaped two story wood-frame structure, with a hip roof, twin interior chimneys, and clapboard siding. Its main entrance is centered in the southern (street-facing) facade, framed by pilasters and a gabled pediment. It is flanked on either side by Italianate polygonal window bays; the upper story of the facade has five sash windows. The western facade, the long portion of the L, has a porch extending along much of its length, with square posts, carved brackets, and a jigsawn balustrade.

Alexander Campbell was born in Georgetown, Maine in 1731, and was involved in military affairs during the French and Indian War, serving in the local militia during the siege of Quebec in 1759. Sometime after 1768, he moved to Cherryfield, where he established a successful lumber mill. During the American Revolutionary War he was again active in the local militia, serving in the defense of Machias in the 1777 Battle of Machias and in the 1779 Penobscot Expedition. He was also politically active, reporting to the Massachusetts legislature (Maine then being a part of that state) on the state of affairs in eastern Maine. He built this fine Federal period house in 1790, and died in 1807. His descendants were responsible for the later Victorian alterations.

== See also ==
- National Register of Historic Places listings in Washington County, Maine
