= Albert Campbell House =

Historic house in Illinois, United States

- U.S. National Register of Historic Places
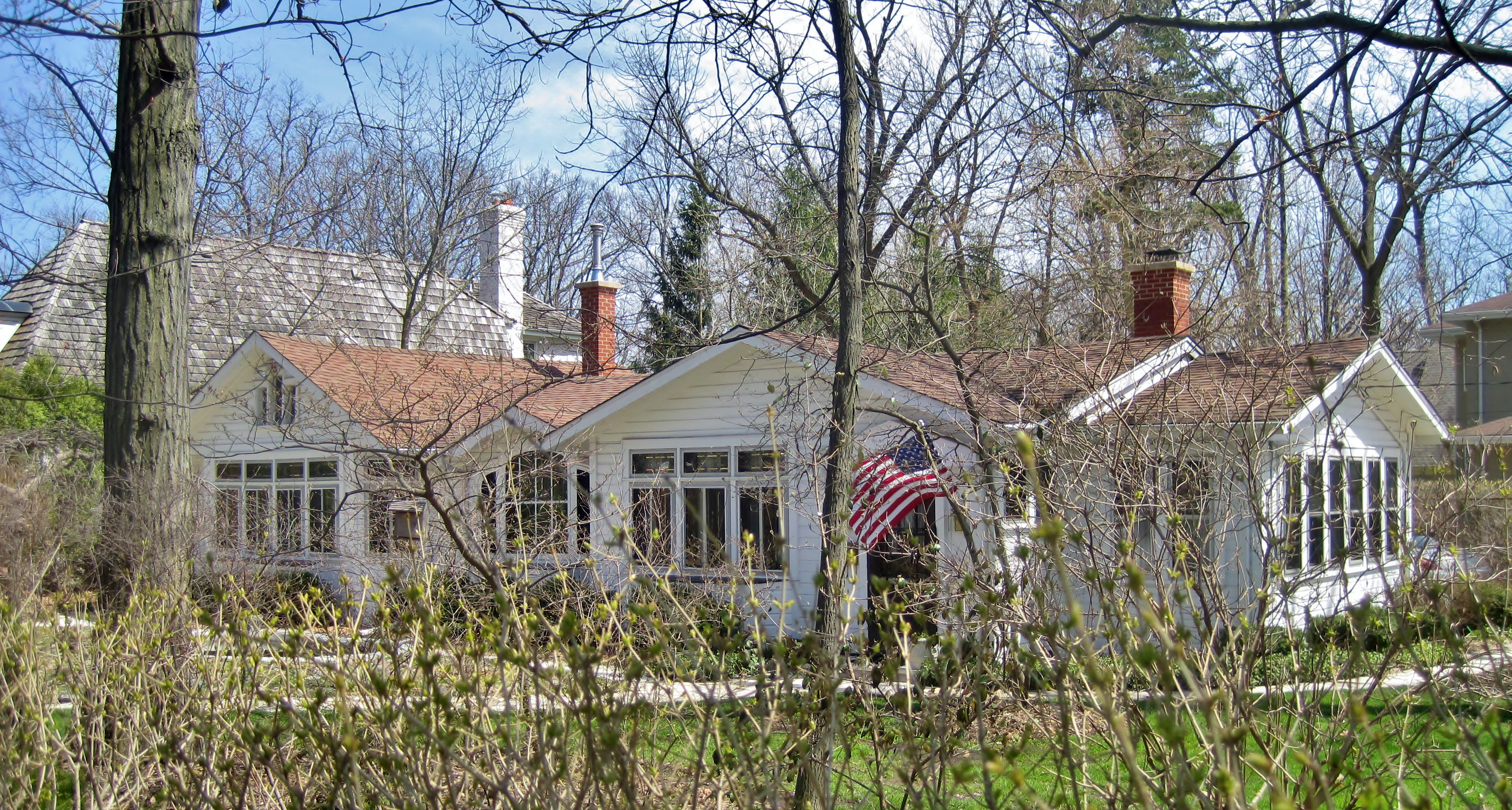
- The house in 2013

- Location within Chicago metropolitan area Location within Illinois Location within the United States
- Location: 434 Marshman Ave., Highland Park, Illinois
- Coordinates: 42°10′08″N 87°46′57″W
- Area: 0.3 acres (0.12 ha)
- Architectural style: American Craftsman
- MPS: Highland Park MRA
- NRHP reference No.: 82002556
- Added to NRHP: September 29, 1982

The Albert Campbell House was a historic house at 434 Marshman Avenue in Highland Park, Illinois. The house's construction date and builder are unknown, though it was most likely built in the early twentieth century. The house has a bungalow-style design inspired by the American Craftsman movement. The house's design features a low profile and several stained glass and etched glass windows. A sizable addition was placed on the west side of the house in 1927, and a second addition was added in the 1930s.

The house was added to the National Register of Historic Places on September 29, 1982. It has since been demolished.
