= Cherryfield Historic District =

Historic district in Maine, United States

- U.S. National Register of Historic Places
- U.S. Historic district
- Location within Maine Location within the United States
- Location: Cherryfield, Maine
- Coordinates: 44°35′54″N 67°55′32″W
- Area: 75 acres (30 ha)
- Architect: Multiple
- Architectural style: Second Empire, Italianate, Queen Anne
- NRHP reference No.: 90001467
- Added to NRHP: October 1, 1990

The Cherryfield Historic District encompasses the historic village center of Cherryfield, Maine. This area is distinctive for its collection of high-quality 19th century architecture, which is unique in rural contexts in the state. The district was listed on the National Register of Historic Places in 1990.

== Overview ==
The Cherryfield Historic District is an area of approximately 75 acres (30 ha) lying on both sides of the Narraguagus River. The historic district comprises a collection of substantially intact residential and commercial buildings that clearly depict the nineteenth century development of a riverside community. There are 52 contributing and 10 non contributing buildings in the district.

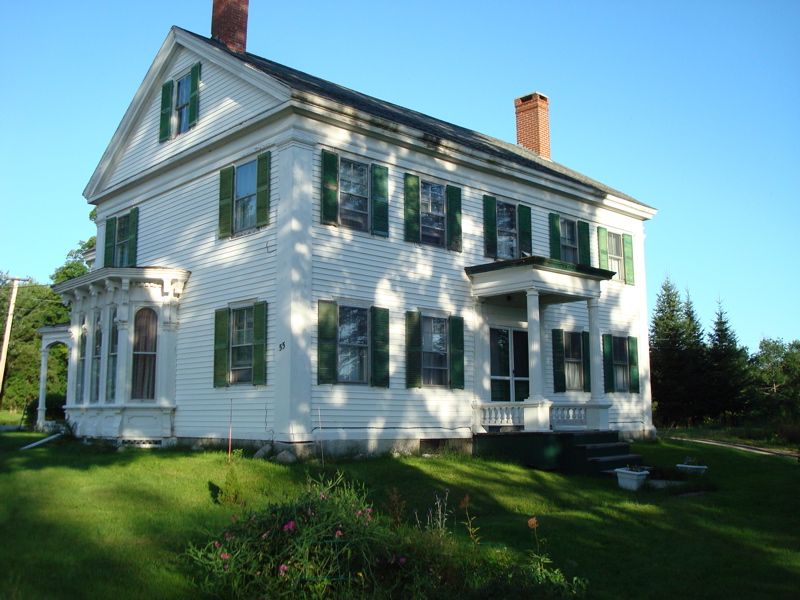
W.D. Ricker House

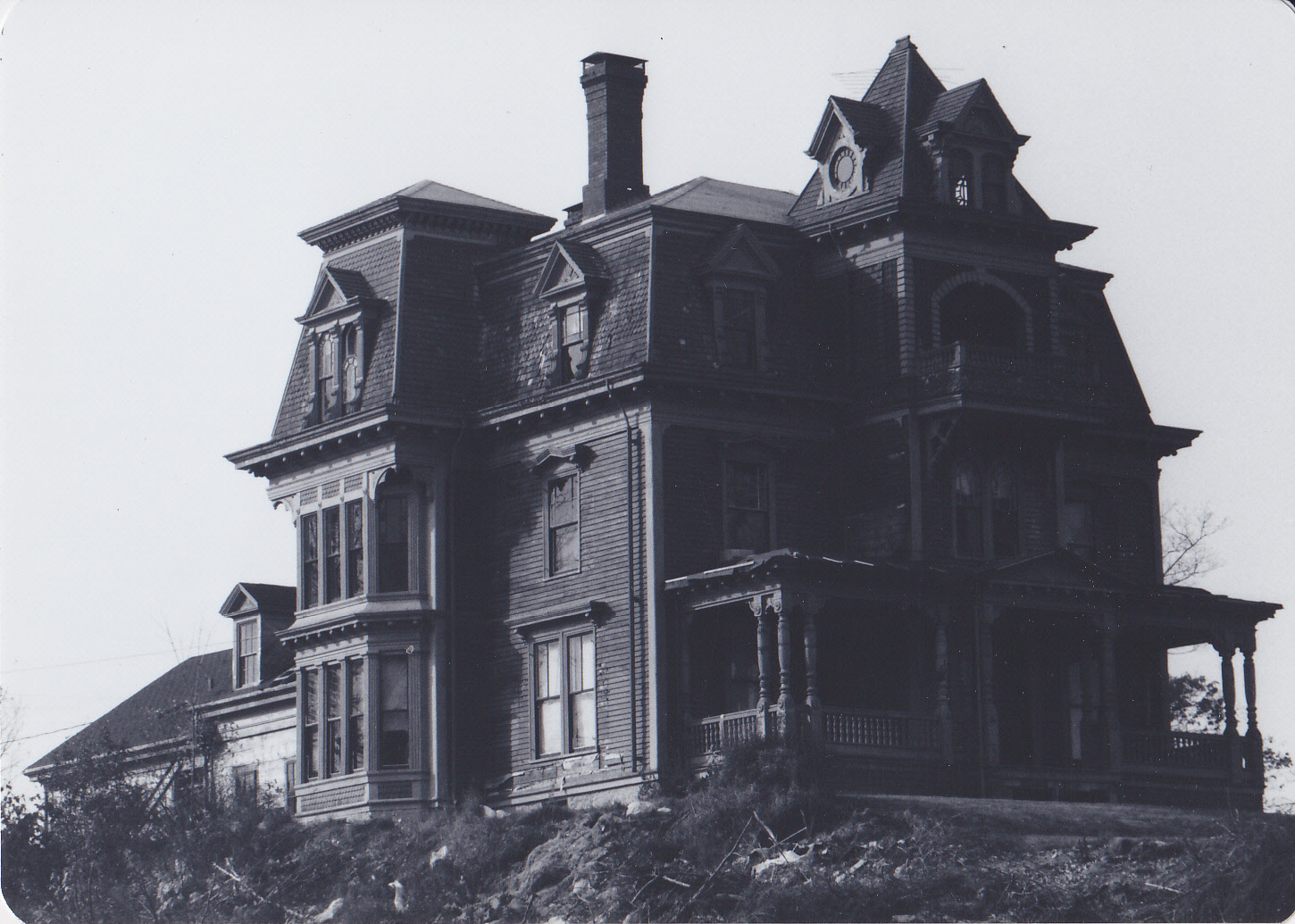
Frank Campbell House

Cherryfield was approved as a historic district because of its depiction of community development and association with commerce, through its association with significant persons, and for architectural history.

Although the 52 contributing buildings in the district and those outside the district are framed with wood, the district architecturally holds representative examples of the most popular nineteenth century residential styles with an especially impressive concentration of Second Empire dwellings. Included in the styles are: Second Empire; Federal; Greek Revival; Italianate; Queen Anne; Colonial Revival.

The Second Empire Style houses are Cherryfield's contribution to the inventory of Maine's historic patterns of building. While the design of these houses may be equalled in urban areas such as Bangor and Portland, their small town context, integrity and relative number are notable.

== List of structures ==
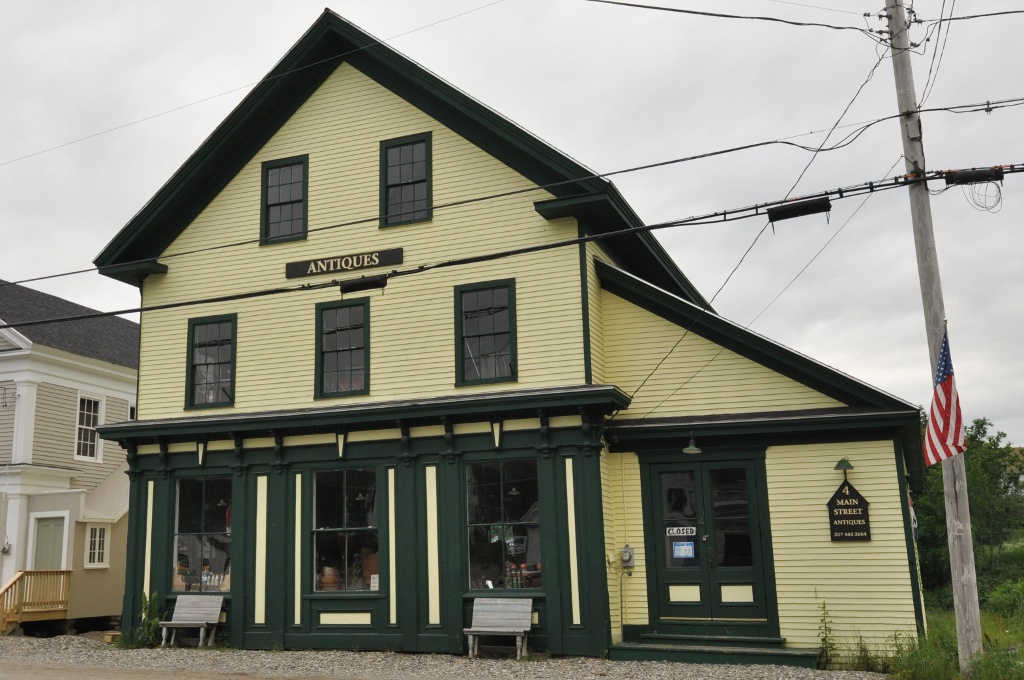
Campbell Store

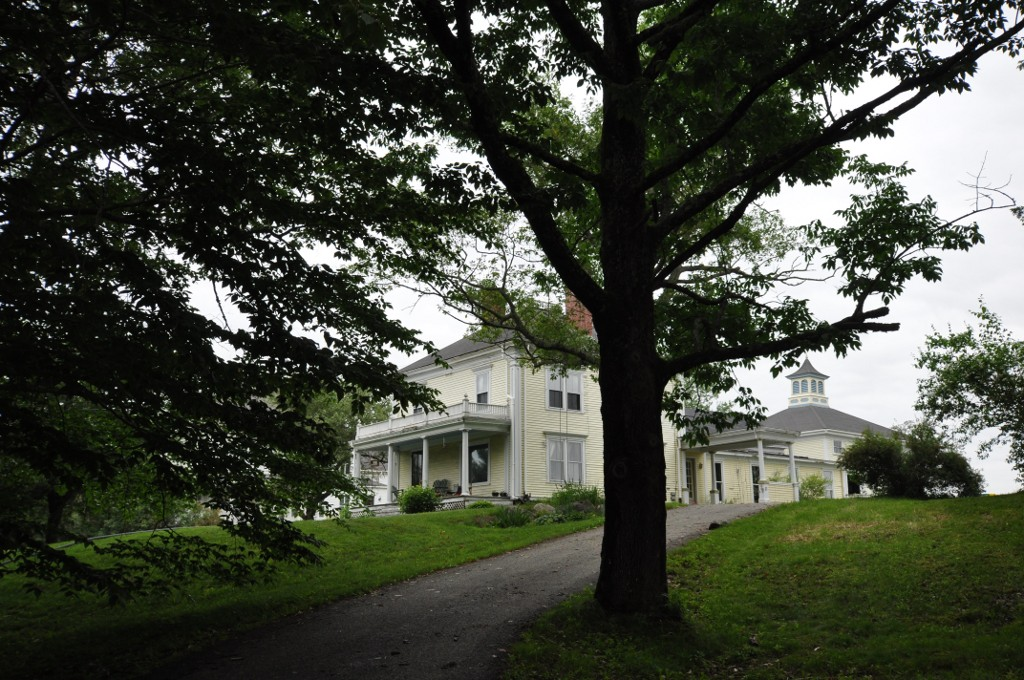
Fred Nickels House

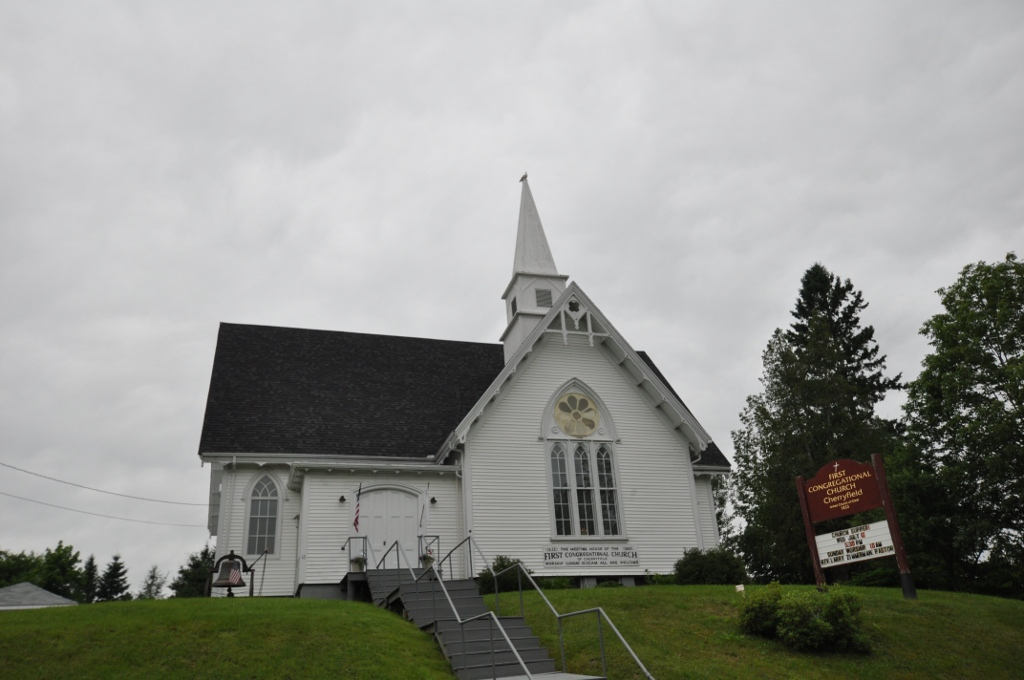
First Congregational Church

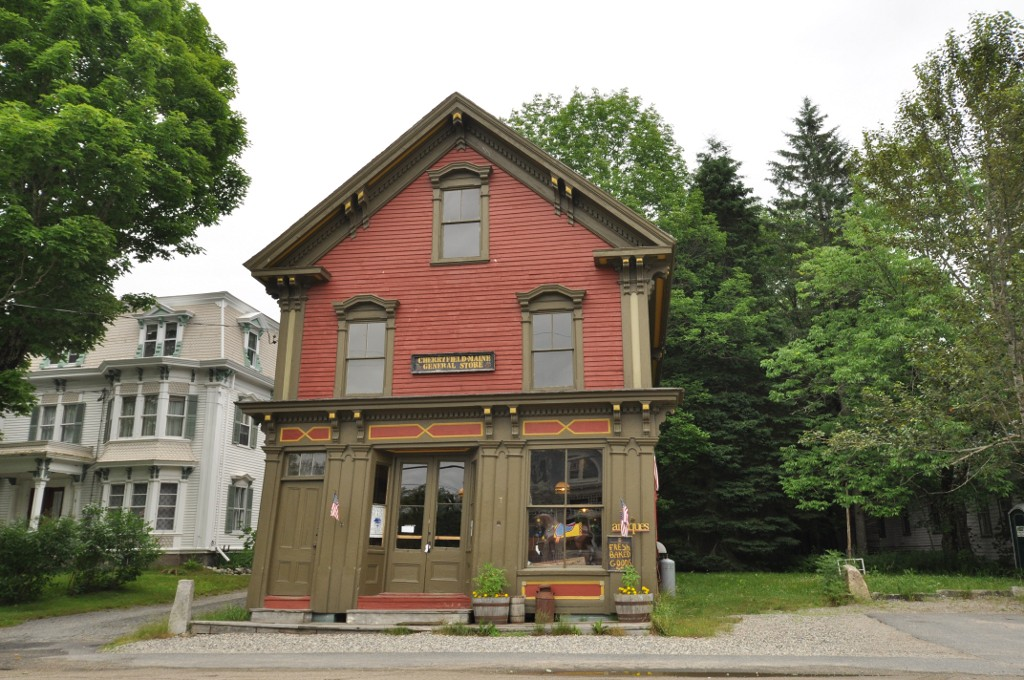
Patten Building

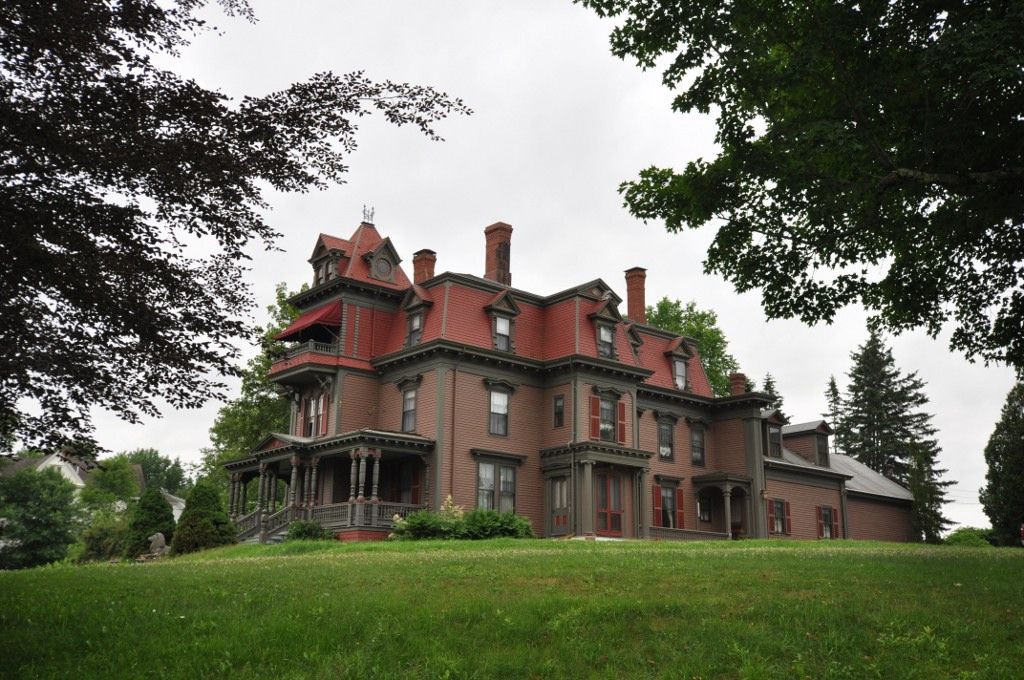
William Nash House

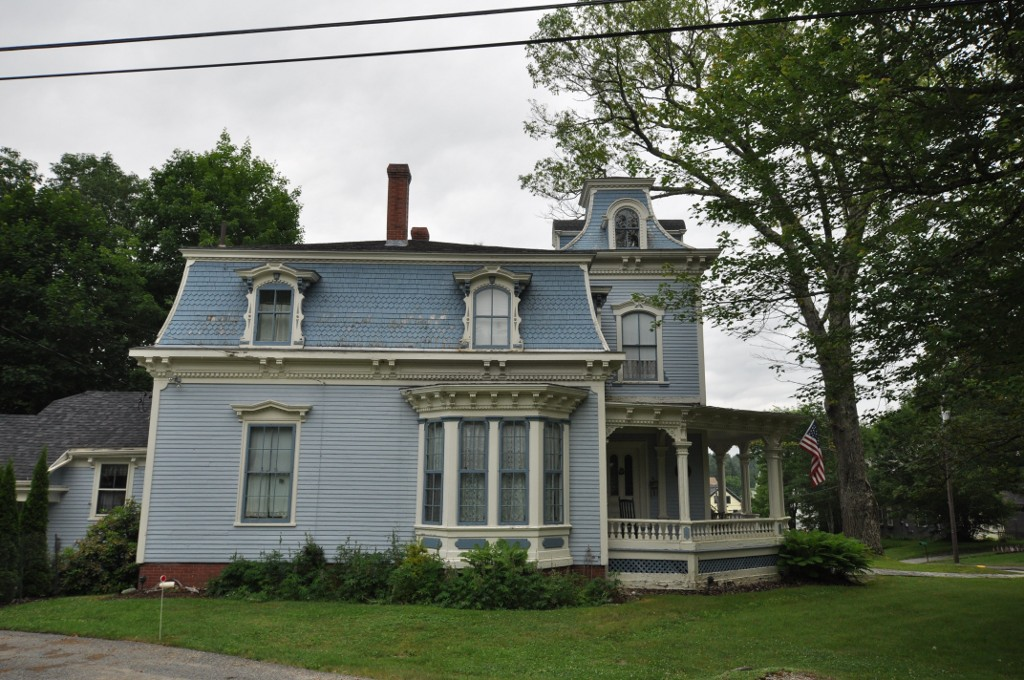
Frank Campbell House

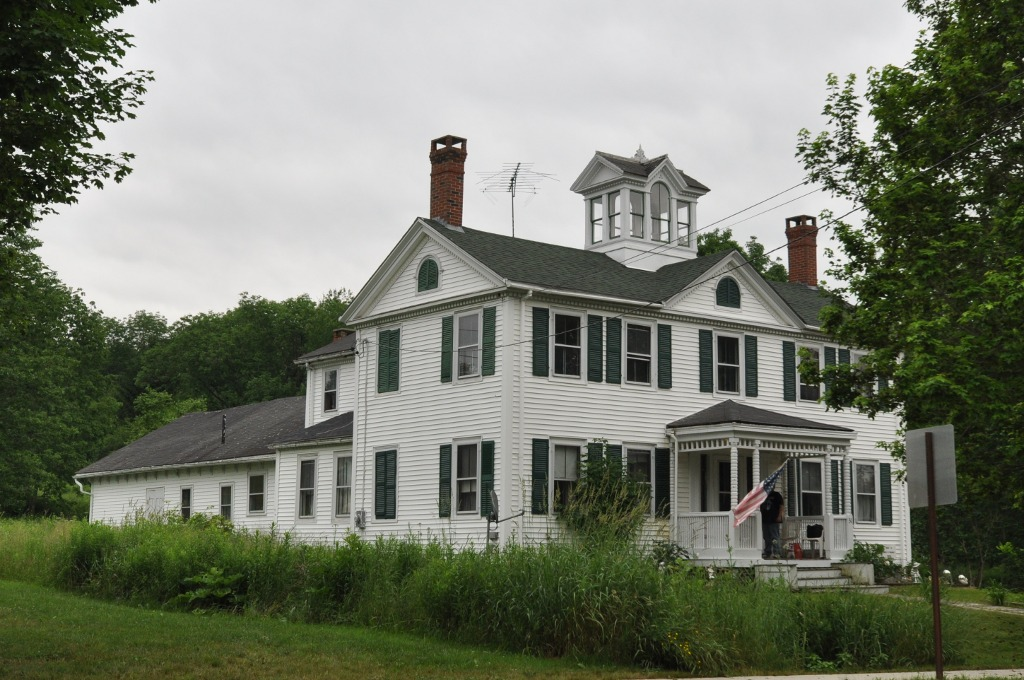
David W. Campbell House

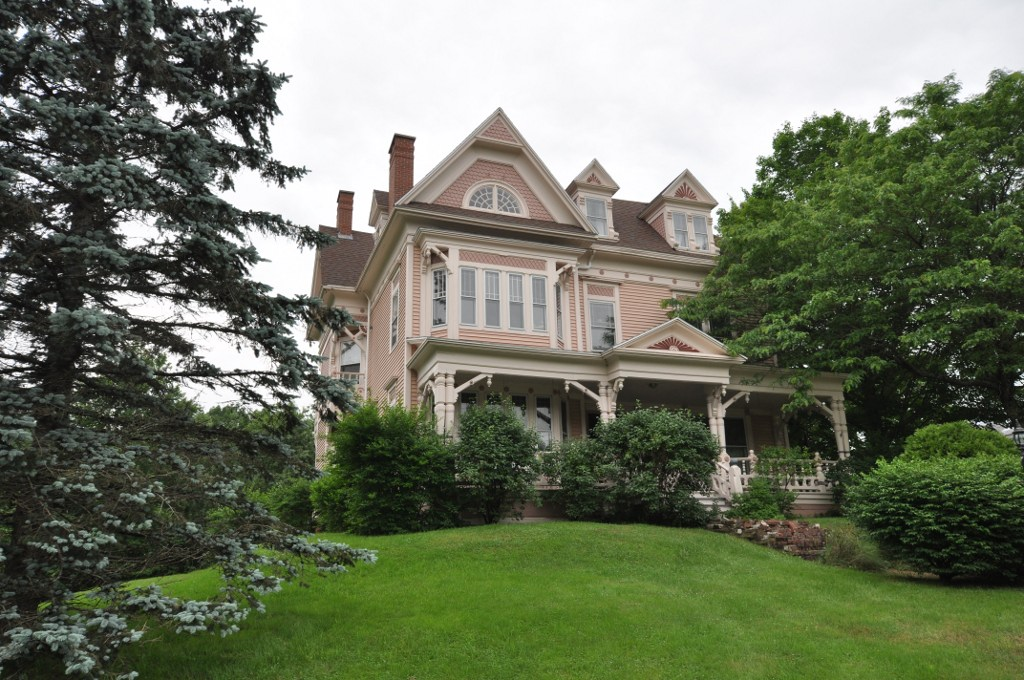
Colonel Samuel Campbell House

- Peter Smith Store, 1858: Vernacular Italianate
- Freeman Nash House, 1840: Greek Revival
- Arthur Willey House, 1876: Second Empire (Willey was a justice and his family included lumber manufacturers and merchants)
- O. Ward House, 1870: Italianate
- Uriah N. Small, 1840: Greek Revival (Small was a merchant, his store was in what was the old post office)
- (First) Amaziah Ricker House, 1803: Federal (Second oldest house in the district, Ricker was the first blacksmith in the area, and his shop was in the adjacent building. The Masonic Lodge organized and met in this house)
- W.D. Ricker House, 1835: Greek Revival
- J.T. Campbell House, 1860: Italianate
- Harland Schoppee House, built after 1881: Late 19th Century Vernacular
- Nugent/Smith House, 1870: Vernacular Greek Revival (by 1881 local merchant Peter Smith had acquired this property)
- Frank Shoppe House, 1900: Vernacular Italianate
- James Campbell House, 1860: Greek Revival (Campbell was a carpenter and a ship joiner)
- Godfrey/Patten House, 1860: Greek Revival/Italianate (Godfrey was a blacksmith & ship smith, Patten a merchant & shoe manufacturer - his store still stands)
- M. Coffin House, 1860: Greek Revival/Italianate
- J.Strout House, 1855: Greek Revival/Italianate
- Frank Campbell House, 1875: Second Empire
- General Alexander Campbell House, 1790: Federal (oldest home in the village. Campbell was the most prominent of Cherryfield's early settlers. He developed a substantial lumber business and was a Massachusetts State Senator from 1791 to 1798. His descendants still live in the house)
- Samuel N. Campbell House, 1883: Queen Anne (A grandson of Alexander Campbell, Samuel was engaged in the lumber business and active in State politics)

== See also ==
- National Register of Historic Places listings in Washington County, Maine
