= Gina Smith Campbell Bathhouse =

- U.S. National Register of Historic Places
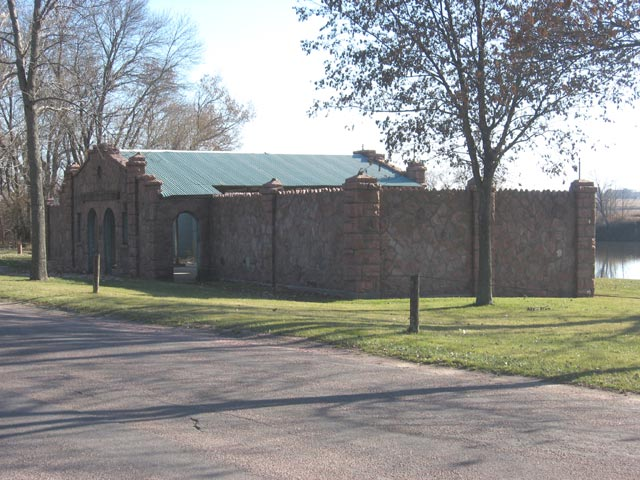
- Gina Smith Campbell Bathhouse in 2009

- Location within South Dakota Location within the United States
- Location: City Park, Beach Ave. extension, Dell Rapids, South Dakota
- Coordinates: 43°49′11.7″N 96°42′07.8″W
- Area: less than one acre
- Built: 1934
- Architect: P.L. Peterson
- Architectural style: Romanesque Revival
- NRHP reference No.: 86000246
- Added to NRHP: February 13, 1986

The Gina Smith Campbell Bathhouse, also known as the Dell Rapids City Park Bathhouse, is a historic building in Dell Rapids City Park in Dell Rapids, South Dakota. It sits on the banks of the Big Sioux River and served a popular bathing beach in the early 19th century. In 1986, it was listed on the National Register of Historic Places.

== History ==
At the turn of the century, the City of Dell Rapids began drawing up plans for a public park along the Big Sioux River. This park was completed and opened in 1913. A bathing beach was also added at this time, for which Gina Smith Campbell had raised the funds to construct. This beach was widely popular, drawing thousands of visitors from across the region to the park every year. Early bathhouses at the park were temporary wooden structures. Under the direction of the City of Dell Rapids and its park board, the permanent stone bathhouse was completed in 1934. Designed by P. L. Peterson and constructed by workers from the Civil Works Administration, the building was dedicated to Campbell upon its completion. The bathhouse contained private showers and bathroom facilities. Although the beach closed in 1960 after the construction of a dedicated swimming pool, the bathhouse has survived and now functions as a covered picnic shelter. It was added to the National Register of Historic Places on February 13, 1986, for its architectural detail and its association with the Civil Works Administration.

== Architecture ==
The bathhouse is a one-story Sioux quartzite building in the Romanesque Revival architectural style. It has two arched entryways on its north and south faces that lead into the main body, which measures 32 by 34 feet (9.8 by 10.4 m). Above the entrances on both sides are bullseye-style and rectangular openings and decorative stone lintels. Originally, it had no roof, but the top of the main body has now been covered with fiberglass to shelter the picnic area underneath; two flanking wings, both measuring 28 by 24 feet (8.5 by 7.3 m), remain open-air. These wings also have simple rectangular entryways. All of the original furnishings and facilities have been stripped out and the building only has picnic tables.
