= Wilson-Pittman-Campbell-Gregory House =

Historic house in Arkansas, United States

- U.S. National Register of Historic Places
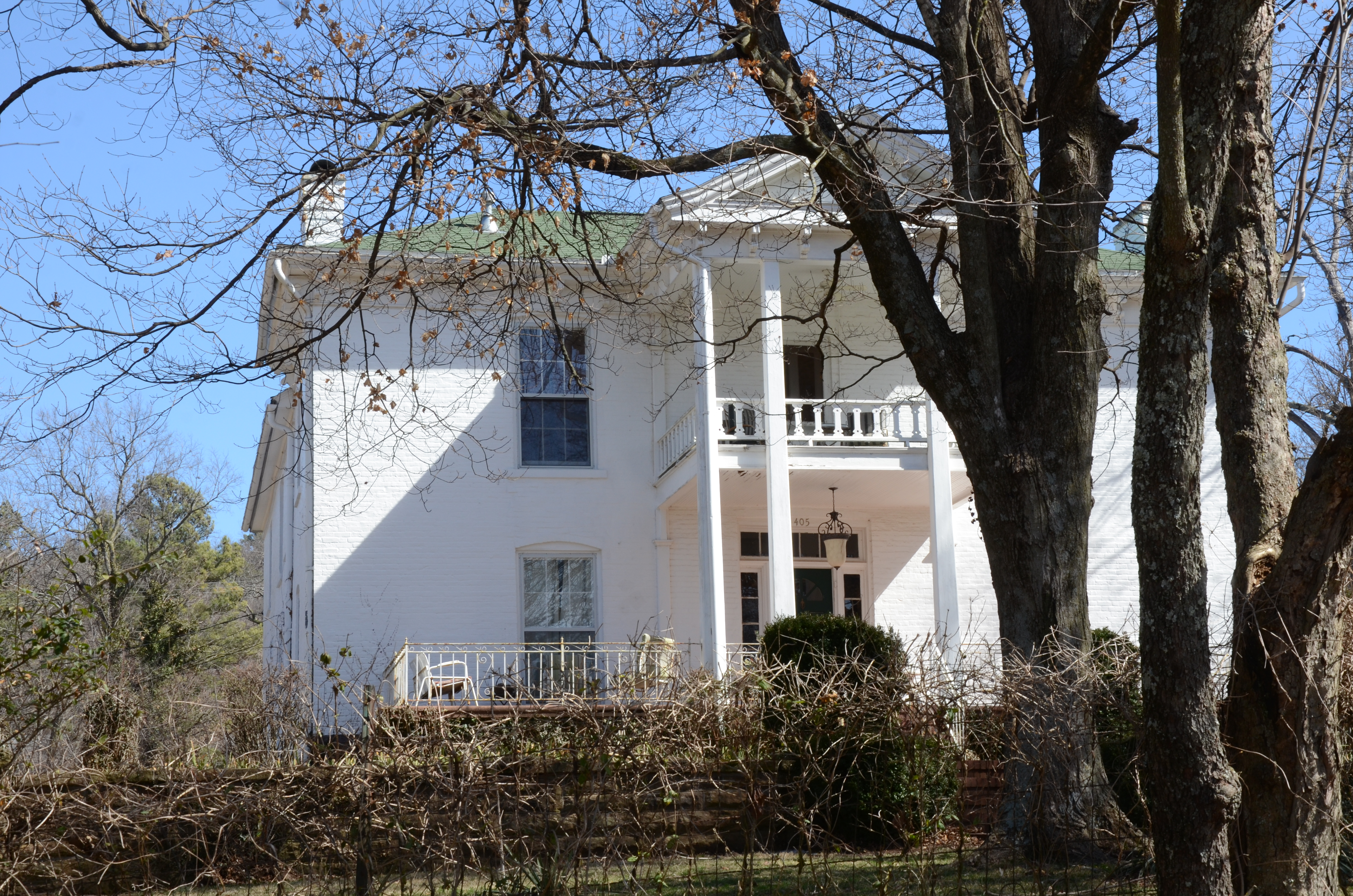

- Location within Arkansas Location within the United States
- Location: 405 E. Dickson St., Fayetteville, Arkansas
- Coordinates: 36°3′55″N 94°9′7″W
- Area: 6 acres (2.4 ha)
- Built: 1866
- Architectural style: Italianate
- NRHP reference No.: 80000790
- Added to NRHP: May 6, 1980

The Wilson-Pittman-Campbell-Gregory House is a historic house at 405 East Dickson Street in Fayetteville, Arkansas. It is a two-story brick structure, with a late 19th-century two-story kitchen addition to the rear, and a modern single-story ell. Its current west-facing front dates stylistically to the 1870s, with Italianate brackets, engaged posts, and balustrade, but is a 1930s reconstruction of the original. Prominent local owners of the building include James Pittman, a Civil War colonel, Benjamin F. Campbell, a businessman, and James Gregory, a local politician.

The house was listed on the National Register of Historic Places in 1980.

== See also ==
- National Register of Historic Places listings in Washington County, Arkansas
