= Frank Campbell House =

Historic house in Maine, United States

- U.S. National Register of Historic Places
- U.S. Historic district – Contributing property
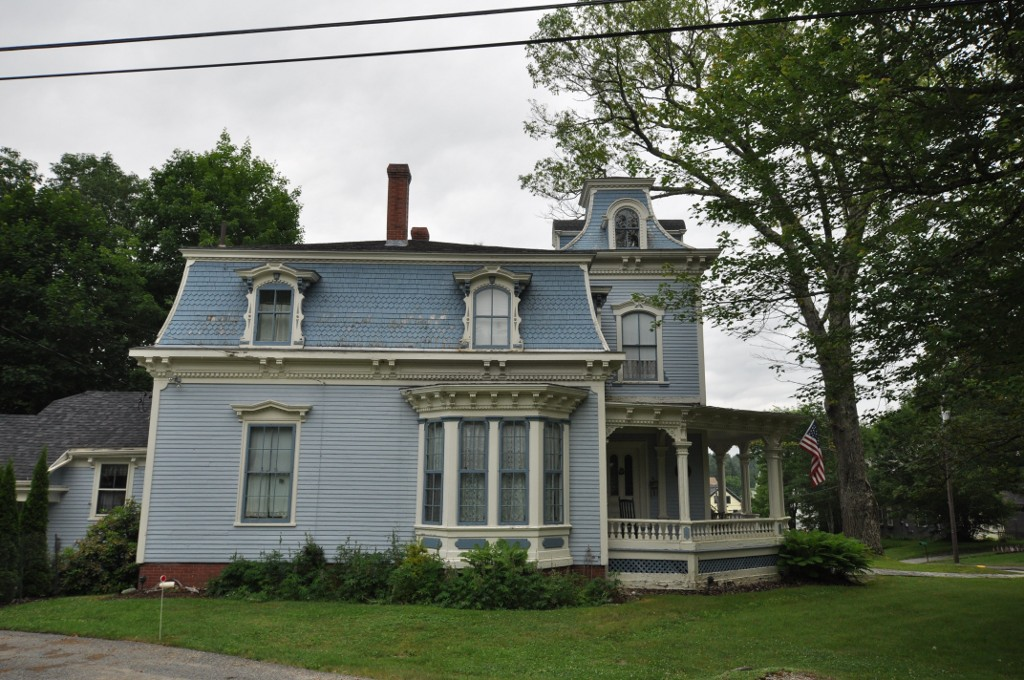

- Location within Maine Location within the United States
- Location: US 1, Cherryfield, Maine
- Coordinates: 44°35′52″N 67°55′23″W
- Area: 0.5 acres (0.20 ha)
- Built: 1875
- Architect: Charles A. Allen
- Architectural style: Second Empire
- Part of: Cherryfield Historic District (ID90001467)
- NRHP reference No.: 82000426

Significant dates
- Added to NRHP: October 29, 1982
- Designated CP: October 1, 1990

The Frank Campbell House is a historic house on United States Route 1 in Cherryfield, Maine, USA. Built in 1875 to a design by regionally known architect Charles A. Allen, it is well-preserved expression of Second Empire architecture, and one of a number of high-style houses in the Cherryfield Historic District. It was individually listed on the National Register of Historic Places in 1982.

== Description and history ==
The Frank Campbell House is located on the south side of Millbridge Road (US Route 1), at the southwest corner with New Street, on the east side of the village of Cherryfield. It is a 1 1/2-story wood-frame structure, roughly square in footprint, with a 2 1/2-story tower projecting from the front (north-facing) facade. It is finished in wooden clapboards, and topped by a flared mansard roof. The tower is capped by a similar roof, and its roof and the main roof are pierce by elaborately decorated dormers with windows set in segmented-arch and round-arch openings. A porch, sympathetic in style to the rest of the house, has been built around the base of the tower. Eave lines are decorated with dentil moulding and decorative brackets. A single-story ell extends the main block to the rear, where it is joined to a small carriage barn.

The house, built in 1875, was designed by Cherryfield resident Charles A. Allen, who designed three other high-style houses in Cherryfield.

== See also ==
- National Register of Historic Places listings in Washington County, Maine
