= Robert E. Campbell House =

Historic house in Oregon, United States

- U.S. National Register of Historic Places
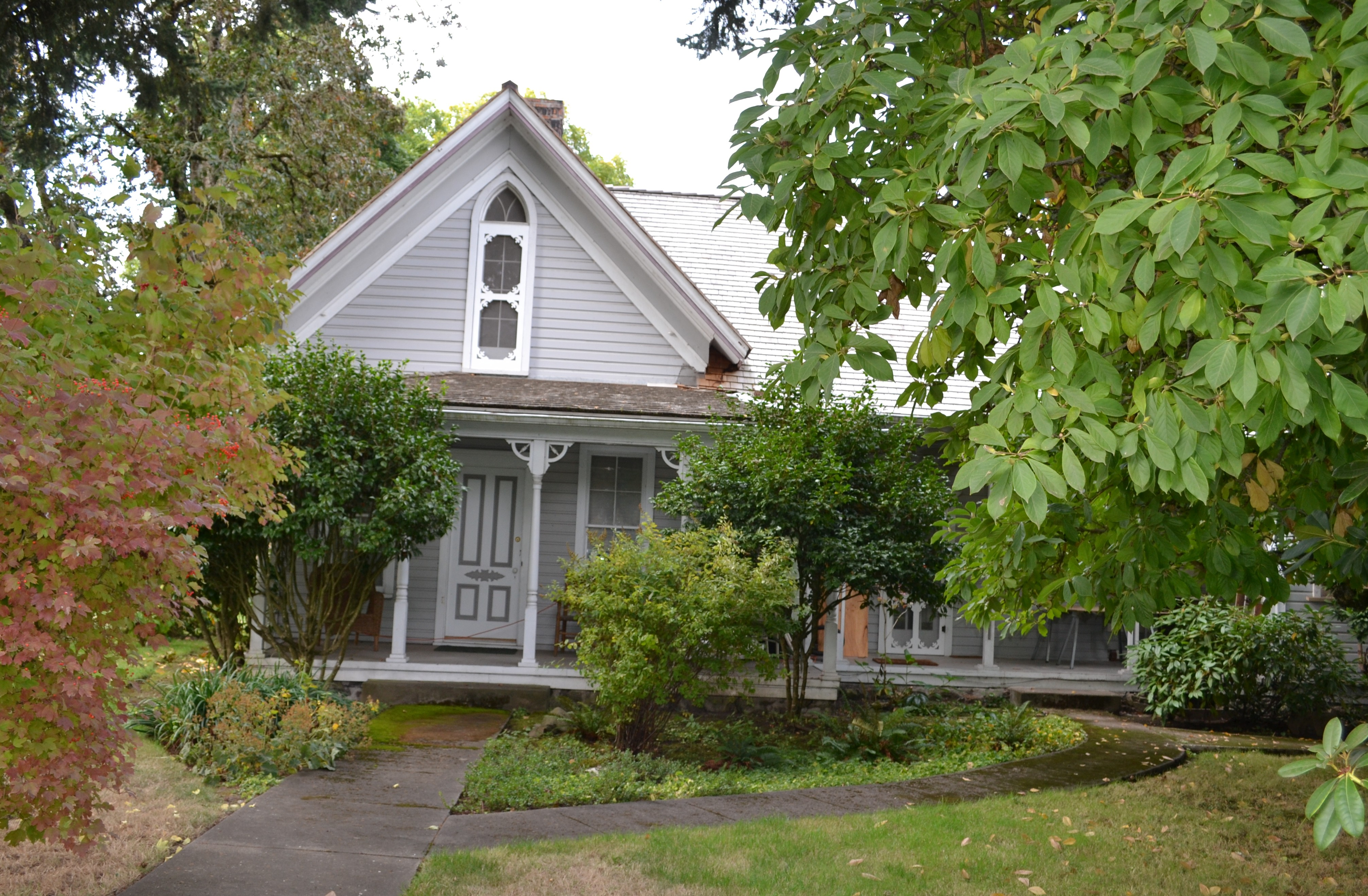
- The house in 2011

- Location within Oregon Location within the United States
- Nearest city: Springfield, Oregon
- Coordinates: 44°3′14″N 123°2′31″W
- Area: 0.4 acres (0.16 ha)
- Built: 1870–1873
- Architectural style: Rural Gothic Cottage Revival
- NRHP reference No.: 79002088
- Added to NRHP: 1 November 1979

The Robert E. Campbell House is a historic house located in Springfield, Oregon. The architectural style reflects Rural Gothic style and it was built by early pioneer Robert E. Campbell about 1873. It was listed on the National Register of Historic Places on November 1, 1979.

== Setting ==
In 1979 the historic building sits on a remaining .44-acre (0.18 ha) parcel of Campbell's Donation Land Claim of 1852. This parcel constitutes a rectangular 150-foot (46 m) by 127-foot (39 m) lot bounded on the east by Aspen Avenue. The structure remains in good condition and largely intact in form and detail. Located outside the city limits in a rural suburban neighborhood the home has about 30 feet (9.1 m) clearance on all sides. The front yard has trees from close to the time the house was built and a garden featuring 26 varieties of rhododendron. There is a large garden in the rear also.

== Robert E. Campbell ==
Robert E. Campbell was born September 4, 1830, in Lafayette County, Missouri and married Ruth Campbell there in 1849. With a team oxen and two cows the Campbells and a cousin traveled to Lane County, Oregon from April to October 1851. He built a 17 feet (5.2 m) by 24 feet (7.3 m) two room log cabin there in 1852. In addition to the substantial agriculture and animal husbandry activities on his 320-acre (130 ha) 1852 Donation Land Claim, he engaged in mining in Jackson County in 1854 and shipping. With his cousin he constructed a flatboat and transported 35 short tons (32 t) of flour to Portland in 1859 for which they received US$2.75 (equivalent to $98.54 in 2025) a barrel. He built the home now known as the Robert E. Campbell House between 1870 and 1873 and removed there in 1876.

== See also ==
- Homestead Acts
- Historic preservation
- National Register of Historic Places listings in Lane County, Oregon
