= Clarence Campbell House =

Historic house in West Virginia, United States

- U.S. National Register of Historic Places
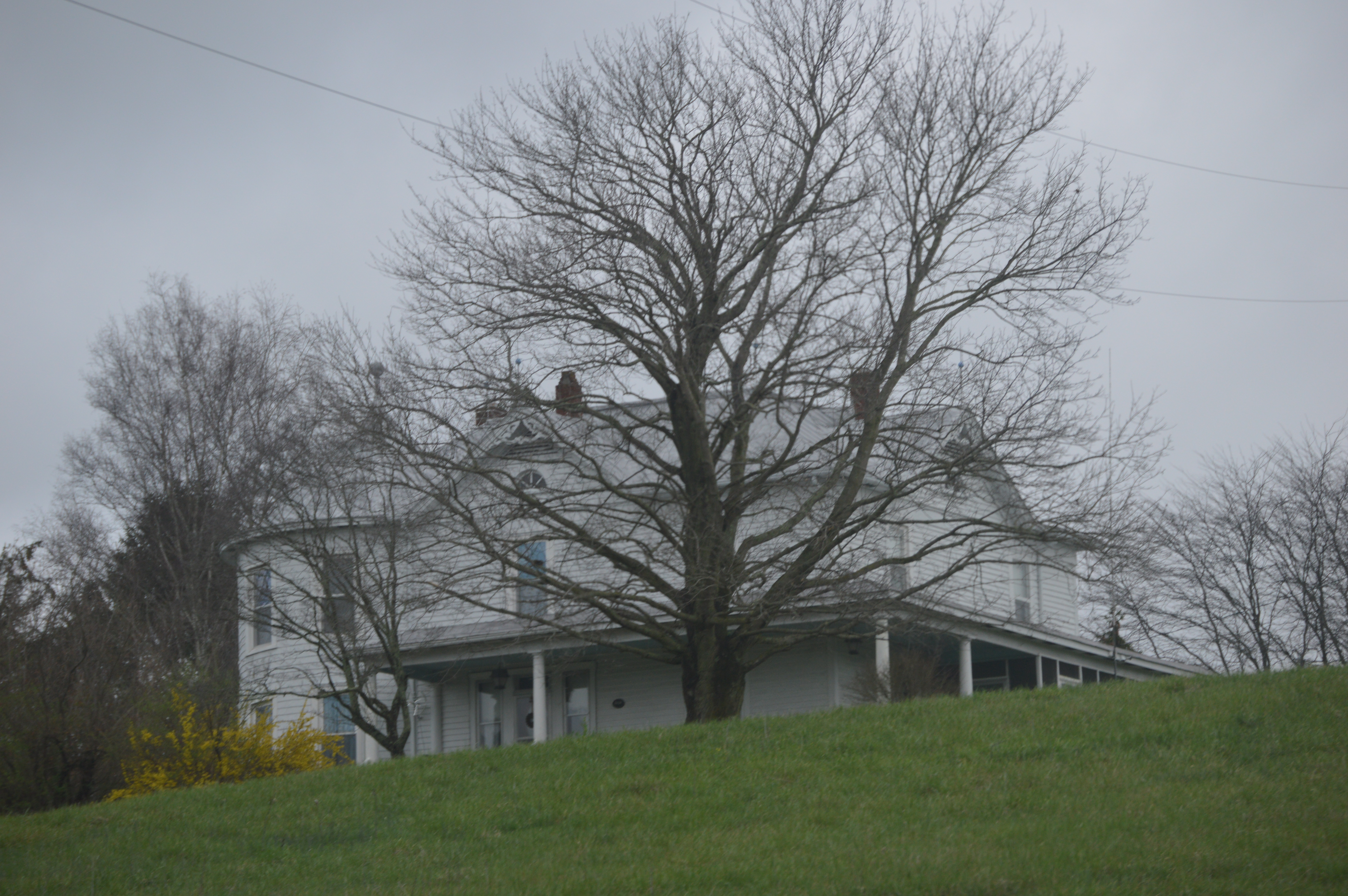
- Roadside view

- Location within West Virginia Location within the United States
- Location: WV 3, near Union, West Virginia
- Coordinates: 37°35′24″N 80°31′26″W
- Area: 9 acres (3.6 ha)
- Built: 1907
- Architect: John Campbell, Clarence Campbell
- Architectural style: Queen Anne
- NRHP reference No.: 95000872
- Added to NRHP: July 21, 1995

Clarence Campbell House, also known as "Hillcrest," is a historic house and farm located near Union, Monroe County, West Virginia. It was built in 1907, and is a large 2 1/2-story, three-bay, frame dwelling in the Queen Anne style. The house is covered in clapboard painted white. It features a two-story rounded tower on the southwestern corner and wraparound verandah. Also on the property is a children's playground (c. 1920), garage and shop (c. 1910), cattle barn (c. 1910), and storage barn (c. 1910).

It was listed on the National Register of Historic Places in 1995.
