= Collen C. Campbell House =

Historic house in Massachusetts, United States

- U.S. National Register of Historic Places
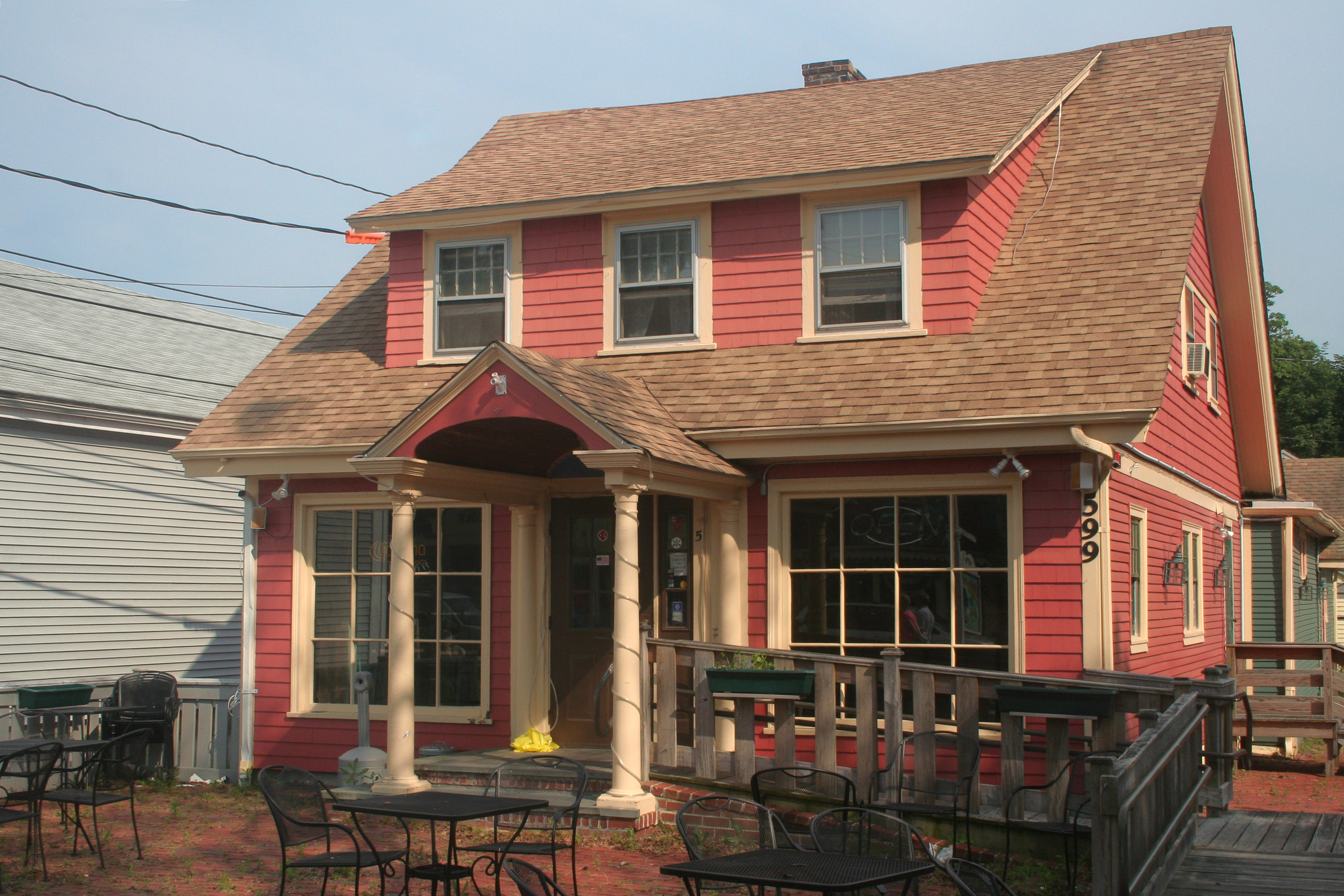

- Location within Cape Cod Location within Massachusetts Location within the United States
- Location: 599 Main Street, Barnstable, Massachusetts
- Coordinates: 41.6490683°N 70.292789°W
- Built: 1920
- Architectural style: Bungalow/Craftsman
- MPS: Barnstable MRA
- NRHP reference No.: 87000297
- Added to NRHP: March 13, 1987

The Collen C. Campbell House is a historic house in Barnstable, Massachusetts. The 1 1/2-story Cape style cottage was built c. 1920, and is distinctive as the only house of the period to be converted to commercial use (Restaurant) compromising its historic character. The significant alteration from its original Arts and Crafts styling is the extension with larger commercial windows flanking the center entry.

The house, named for Judge Collen C. Campbell of the Barnstable County Probate Court, was listed on the National Register of Historic Places in 1987.

== See also ==
- National Register of Historic Places listings in Barnstable County, Massachusetts
