= William Campbell House (Park City, Utah) =

- U.S. National Register of Historic Places
- Location within Utah Location within the United States
- Location: 164 Norfolk St., Park City, Utah
- Coordinates: 40°38′26″N 111°29′43″W
- Area: less than one acre
- Built: c.1900
- MPS: Mining Boom Era Houses TR
- NRHP reference No.: 84002243
- Added to NRHP: July 11, 1984

The William Campbell House, at 164 Norfolk St. in Park City, Utah, was built around 1900. It was listed on the National Register of Historic Places in 1984.

It is a one-story frame pyramid house.

It was probably owned by a William Campbell.

The house may no longer exist.
