= William H. and Alma Downer Campbell House =

Historic house in Minnesota, United States

- U.S. National Register of Historic Places
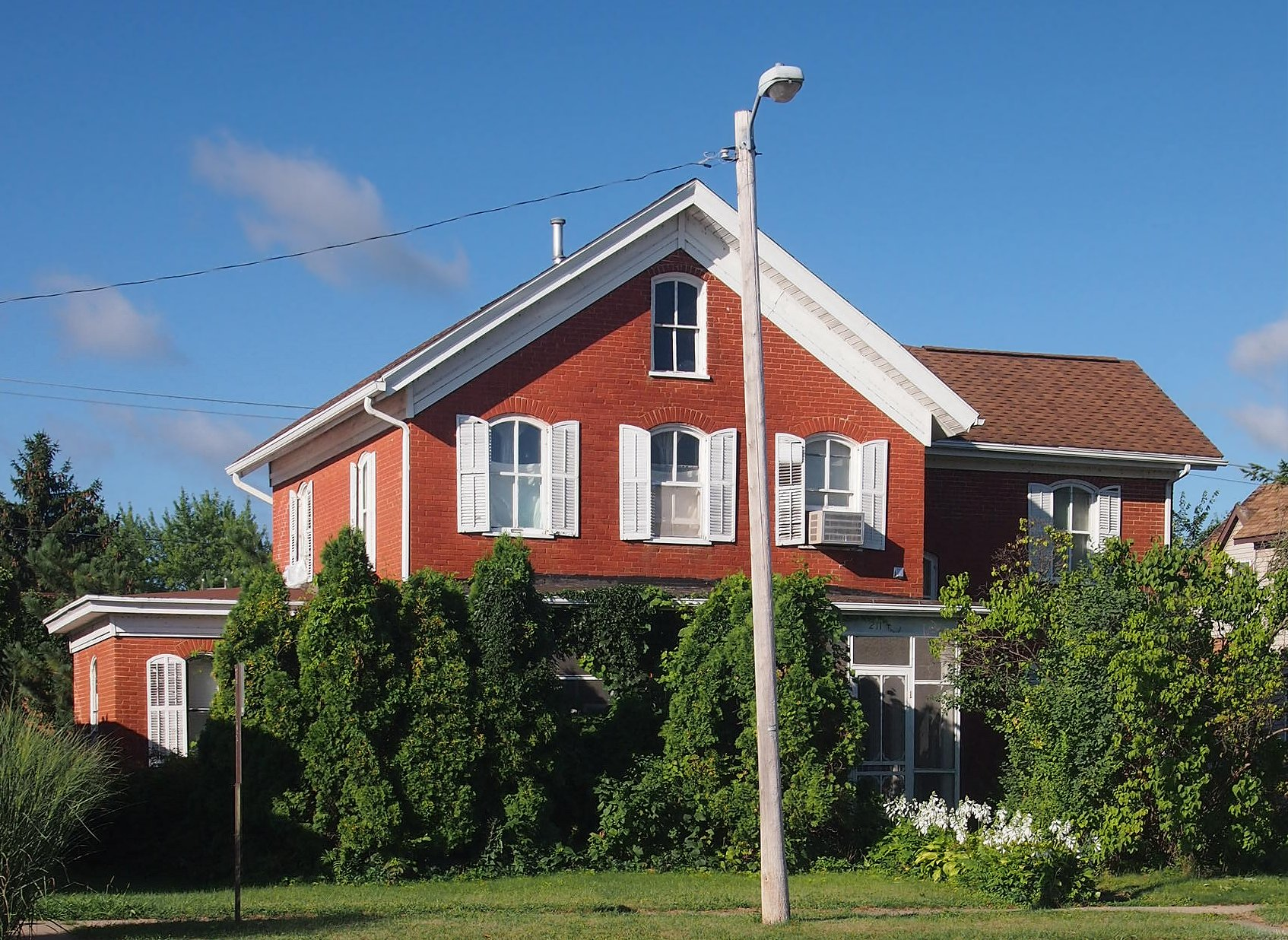
- The William H. and Alma Downer Campbell House from the northeast

- Location within Minnesota Location within the United States
- Location: 211 2nd Street West, Wabasha, Minnesota
- Coordinates: 44°22′59.2″N 92°2′3.2″W
- Area: Less than one acre
- Built: 1874
- MPS: Red Brick Houses in Wabasha, Minnesota, Associated with Merchant-Tradesmen MPS
- NRHP reference No.: 89000367
- Designated: May 15, 1989

The William H. and Alma Downer Campbell House is a historic house in Wabasha, Minnesota, United States. When it was built in 1874, it overlooked downtown Wabasha. The house was listed on the National Register of Historic Places in 1989 for having local significance in the theme of architecture. It was nominated for being one of the largest and most prominent houses of its era in Wabasha.

== Description ==
Although the Campbell House has a brick veneer, it is a wood frame building on a limestone foundation. It has a somewhat irregular footprint, with three gabled sections that rise two stories and a fourth section that rises one story and has a flat roof. The house's massing, rooflines, window placement, and wide frieze boards suggest Greek Revival architecture, but the segmental-arched windows, bowed shutters, fanlight over the front doors, and centered attic window are more characteristic of Federal architecture.

In the house's original configuration, the wings to the northwest and southwest stood just one story, and the latter, a kitchen, was all wood. A major remodeling around the year 1900 raised both wings to two stories. They also received brick cladding, rooflines, and window treatments that were closely matched with the central section. During this remodeling the interior was retrimmed with oak and a grand staircase added.

A detached garage at the rear of the property is a more recent addition and is not considered a contributing element to the historic house.

== History ==
William H. Campbell settled in Wabasha in 1857, though he left temporarily to serve in the American Civil War. Upon his return he gained prosperity as a merchant and agriculturalist, one of the few Wabasha-based merchants to also have extensive farming interests. He served as Wabasha County auditor for many years beginning in 1872, and was also master of the Bear Valley Grange Hall. With assistance from his father-in-law, Campbell had this house constructed in 1874, where it proudly overlooked a downtown that both men had helped establish economically.

The Campbell House is an example of some 20 brick residences surviving from the 19th century in Wabasha. All were built by the first two generations of the city's merchant class, forming a distinctive architectural stock that contrasts with the elaborate wood-frame Victorian architecture that characterized most other communities in Minnesota. As time went on the choice of building material appears to have been a matter of local taste rather than accessibility, as Wabasha was not a major brick manufacturer compared to Lake City and Red Wing upriver.

== See also ==
- National Register of Historic Places listings in Wabasha County, Minnesota
