= William Campbell House (Stamping Ground, Kentucky) =

Historic house in Kentucky, United States

- U.S. National Register of Historic Places
- Location within Kentucky Location within the United States
- Nearest city: Stamping Ground, Kentucky
- Coordinates: 38°15′42″N 84°39′56″W
- Built: c.1790-1800
- NRHP reference No.: 84000415
- Added to NRHP: November 29, 1984

The William Campbell House in Stamping Ground, Kentucky, also known as the Campbell-Gayle House, is an early house believed to have been built in c.1790-1800. It was listed on the National Register of Historic Places in 1984.

It is notable as a "unique early house of brick nogging-filled half timber construction with a beaded clapboard-covered main facade and a steeply pitched roof."

The exterior of the brick nogging (infill between the timbers) is plastered with stucco while the timbers are not; this is unusual as the only house in Kentucky known to have this feature. The 32 feet (9.8 m) by 28 feet (8.5 m) house also has a steep roof and just one window each for the two front rooms. The appearance of the house is much like historic Colonial dwellings in the eastern colonies. The construction is thus dated to pioneer era and perhaps the 18th century.
