= William S. Campbell House =

Historic house in Tennessee, United States

- U.S. National Register of Historic Places
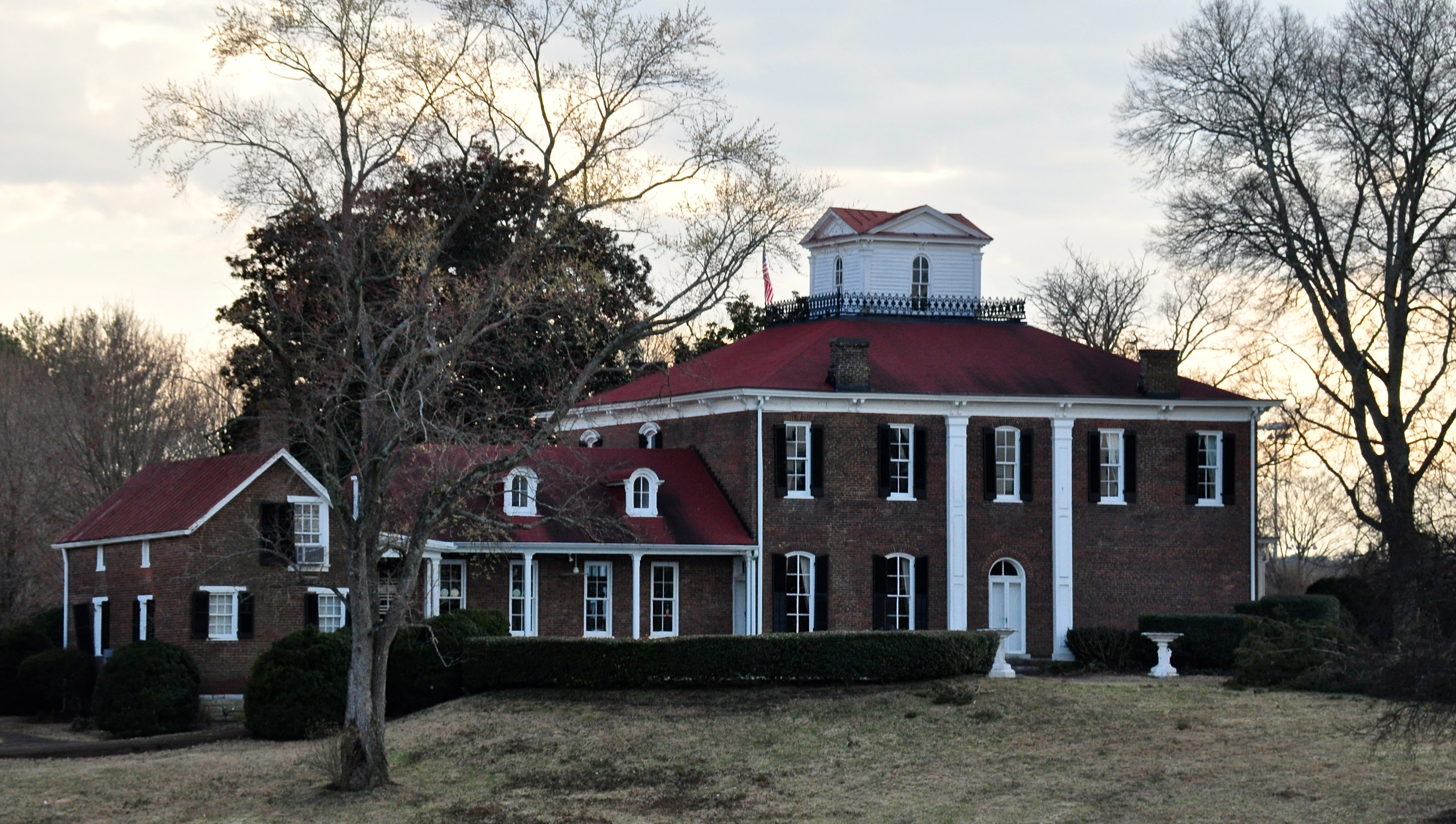
- William S. Campbell House, February 2014.

- Location within Tennessee Location within the United States
- Location: TN 96, Franklin, Tennessee
- Coordinates: 35°55′27″N 86°53′8″W
- Area: 12 acres (4.9 ha)
- Built: 1840
- Architect: Campbell, William S.
- Architectural style: Italianate
- NRHP reference No.: 75001798
- Added to NRHP: October 29, 1975

The William S. Campbell House is a property in Franklin, Tennessee that was listed on the National Register of Historic Places in 1975. A private residence, it is also known as Magnolia Hall and was built in 1840. It is part of the Boyd Mill Avenue Historic District. William S. Campbell was born in Ireland, and opened a national bank in the area after the American Civil War.

The house is of Italianate architecture, and has a cupola and a widow's walk. When listed the property included four contributing buildings. The listing is for an area of 12 acres (4.9 ha).

It is located on TN 96 west of the downtown area.
