= Cherryfield, Maine =

- Town
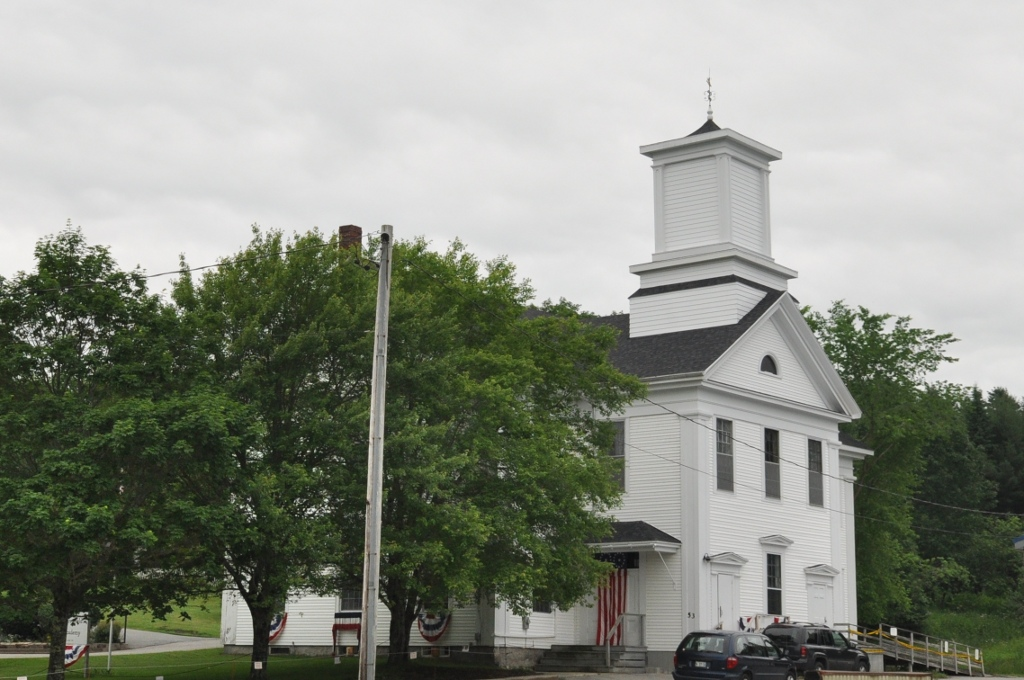
- Cherryfield Academy building, now housing town offices

- Logo

- Location within Maine Location within the United States
- Coordinates: 44°36′36″N 67°55′46″W
- Country: United States
- State: Maine
- County: Washington

Area
  - Total: 44.99 sq mi (116.52 km^{2})
  - Land: 44.44 sq mi (115.10 km^{2})
  - Water: 0.55 sq mi (1.42 km^{2})
- Elevation: 131 ft (40 m)

Population (2020)
  - Total: 1,107
  - Density: 25/sq mi (9.6/km^{2})
- Time zone: UTC-5 (Eastern (EST))
  - Summer (DST): UTC-4 (EDT)
- ZIP code: 04622
- Area code: 207
- FIPS code: 23-12455
- GNIS feature ID: 582407
- Website: www.cherryfieldmaine.us

Cherryfield is a town in Washington County, Maine, United States on the Narraguagus River. It was named for the wild cherries that once peppered the banks of the river. The town population was 1,107 at the 2020 census. The town bills itself as the "Blueberry Capital of the World". Roughly 75 acres (300,000 m^{2}) on both sides of the river are a historic district on the National Register of Historic Places known as the Cherryfield Historic District. This district comprises a collection of period structures dating from c. 1750–1890. The town was first settled about 1760. In 1826, the part of Steuben known as Narraguagus was annexed onto Cherryfield.

== Geography ==
According to the United States Census Bureau, the town has a total area of 44.99 square miles (116.52 km^{2}), of which 44.44 square miles (115.10 km^{2}) is land and 0.55 square miles (1.42 km^{2}) is water. The town is home to two breeding pairs of bald eagles.

== Demographics ==
Historical population
| Census | Pop. | Note | %± |
|---|---|---|---|
| 1810 | 181 | | — |
| 1820 | 241 | | 33.1% |
| 1830 | 583 | | 141.9% |
| 1840 | 1,003 | | 72.0% |
| 1850 | 1,648 | | 64.3% |
| 1860 | 1,755 | | 6.5% |
| 1870 | 1,760 | | 0.3% |
| 1880 | 1,793 | | 1.9% |
| 1890 | 1,787 | | −0.3% |
| 1900 | 1,859 | | 4.0% |
| 1910 | 1,499 | | −19.4% |
| 1920 | 1,304 | | −13.0% |
| 1930 | 1,112 | | −14.7% |
| 1940 | 1,046 | | −5.9% |
| 1950 | 904 | | −13.6% |
| 1960 | 780 | | −13.7% |
| 1970 | 771 | | −1.2% |
| 1980 | 983 | | 27.5% |
| 1990 | 1,183 | | 20.3% |
| 2000 | 1,157 | | −2.2% |
| 2010 | 1,232 | | 6.5% |
| 2020 | 1,107 | | −10.1% |
U.S. Decennial Census

=== 2010 census ===
As of the census of 2010, there were 1,232 people, 570 households, and 332 families living in the town. The population density was 27.7 inhabitants per square mile (10.7/km^{2}). There were 743 housing units at an average density of 16.7 per square mile (6.4/km^{2}). The racial makeup of the town was 96.2% White, 0.2% African American, 0.9% Native American, 0.4% Asian, 0.6% from other races, and 1.8% from two or more races. Hispanic or Latino of any race were 1.0% of the population.

There were 570 households, of which 22.6% had children under the age of 18 living with them, 40.5% were married couples living together, 10.7% had a female householder with no husband present, 7.0% had a male householder with no wife present, and 41.8% were non-families. 36.1% of all households were made up of individuals, and 19% had someone living alone who was 65 years of age or older. The average household size was 2.16 and the average family size was 2.73.

The median age in the town was 48.8 years. 19.2% of residents were under the age of 18; 4.5% were between the ages of 18 and 24; 20.7% were from 25 to 44; 32.1% were from 45 to 64; and 23.6% were 65 years of age or older. The gender makeup of the town was 47.4% male and 52.6% female.

=== 2000 census ===
As of the census of 2000, there were 1,157 people, 493 households, and 317 families living in the town. The population density was 26.5 inhabitants per square mile (10.2/km^{2}). There were 644 housing units at an average density of 14.7 per square mile (5.7/km^{2}). The racial makeup of the town was 98.01% White, 0.09% African American, 0.69% Native American, 0.43% Asian, 0.17% from other races, and 0.61% from two or more races. Hispanic or Latino of any race were 0.09% of the population.

There were 493 households, out of which 27.4% had children under the age of 18 living with them, 51.7% were married couples living together, 8.1% had a female householder with no husband present, and 35.5% were non-families. 30.6% of all households were made up of individuals, and 17.2% had someone living alone who was 65 years of age or older. The average household size was 2.29 and the average family size was 2.85.

In the town, the population was spread out, with 22.5% under the age of 18, 5.3% from 18 to 24, 24.0% from 25 to 44, 27.5% from 45 to 64, and 20.7% who were 65 years of age or older. The median age was 44 years. For every 100 females there were 87.2 males. For every 100 females age 18 and over, there were 88.1 males.

The median income for a household in the town was $21,486, and the median income for a family was $31,016. Males had a median income of $26,058 versus $20,000 for females. The per capita income for the town was $13,111. About 15.8% of families and 21.9% of the population were below the poverty line, including 24.6% of those under age 18 and 27.5% of those age 65 or over.

== Education ==
It is in the Cherryfield School District. As of 2012 Kenneth Johnson is the Superintendent of Schools. Lubec Consolidated School belongs to that district.

A school at Cherryfield closed at some point.

Cherryfield Academy formerly existed in Cherryfield.

== Notable people ==
- Hiram Burnham, Civil War-era general
- Andy Santerre, former NASCAR driver and owner
- Carlton Willey, major league pitcher for the Milwaukee Braves and New York Mets
