= Sociedad Latina =

US non-profit organization

Sociedad Latina, Inc.
- Founded: 1968
- Purpose: positive youth development
- Location: Boston
- Region served: Roxbury
- Employees: 18
- Website: sociedadlatina.org

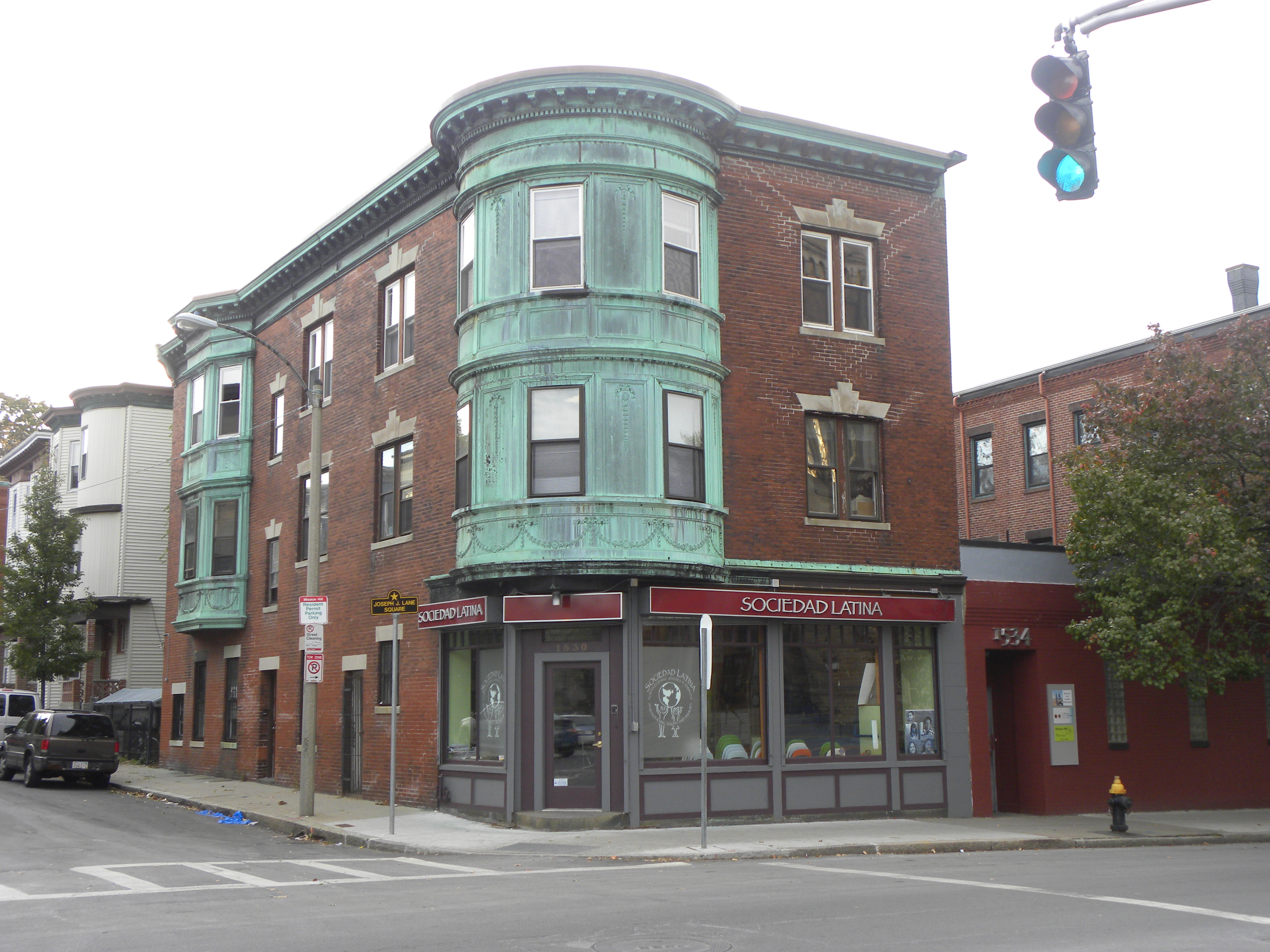
Sociedad Latina

Sociedad Latina is a non-profit organization founded in 1968 for at-risk Latino youth located in the Mission Hill neighborhood of Boston.

Sociedad Latina was founded by Jorge Rivera, David Rideout, John Carroll, and Lynn Minna to provide cultural, social, and recreational activities for the Latino population in the South Boston neighborhood. It was originally named Sociedad Latina de South Boston, where they served as a space for Latinos to find fellowship and celebrate their cultures of origin. Local businesses and community residents sponsored the organization's baseball, basketball, and volleyball leagues. The organization changed its name to Sociedad Latina in 1981 and moved to Tremont Street in the Mission Hill neighborhood.

Since 1999, the organization has quadrupled its budget and now focuses on systemic change and positive youth development. Sociedad Latina guides youth into college, provides meaningful jobs that build professional and personal skills, and creates progressive change in the community.

== Pathways to Success ==
Sociedad Latina's Pathways to Success Model is a collection of programs for people age 11–21, as well as programs for parents. Topics include civic engagement, education, arts and culture, and workplace skills development.

== Media coverage ==
In 2003, The Boston Globe profiled Sociedad Latina's Unique Rhythm dance team that performed salsa, merengue, hip-hop, and other styles, with participants receiving tutoring and additional support services. In 2005, the newspaper wrote about Sociedad Latina's tobacco control campaign that drafted and helped pass a city ordinance, raising fines for selling tobacco to minors and doubling the annual fee merchants pay the city for selling tobacco. The additional revenue collected was appropriated to enforcing underage smoking laws. In 2008, the newspaper wrote about Sociedad Latina's annual Three Kings Day Celebration, which began in 1992, a tradition that provides a free holiday meal and toys for hundreds of community families. In 2009, the newspaper covered Sociedad Latina's campaign against unhealthy advertising that resulted in a city ordinance fining merchants who cover more than 30 percent of their storefronts in ads. In 2010, the newspaper wrote about Sociedad Latina's education reform campaign to increase cultural proficiency levels in Boston Public Schools. The campaign was also covered in El Planeta in 2011.

The Boston Herald wrote about the Sociedad Latina-created Youth NOISE (Neighborhood Outreach for Inner Street Empowerment) program in 2009.

In 2010, El Planeta profiled Sociedad Latina's Summer Seedlings Program, an alternative summer school for middle school students. The program was also featured on Boston Neighborhood Network's Neighborhood Network News in 2011. In 2011, El Planeta profiled Sociedad Latina's youth fitness boot camp, which runs during spring break and features healthy activities and wellness workshops.

In 2009, El Mundo profiled Sociedad Latina's girls' mentoring program, Viva La Cultura!, as well as the organization's celebration of National Hispanic Heritage Month.

In 2011, the Mission Hill Gazette covered Sociedad Latina's campaign against sugar-sweetened beverages in local hospitals, part of its work against community health inequities.
