= Charles J. Bateman =

American architect (1851–1940)

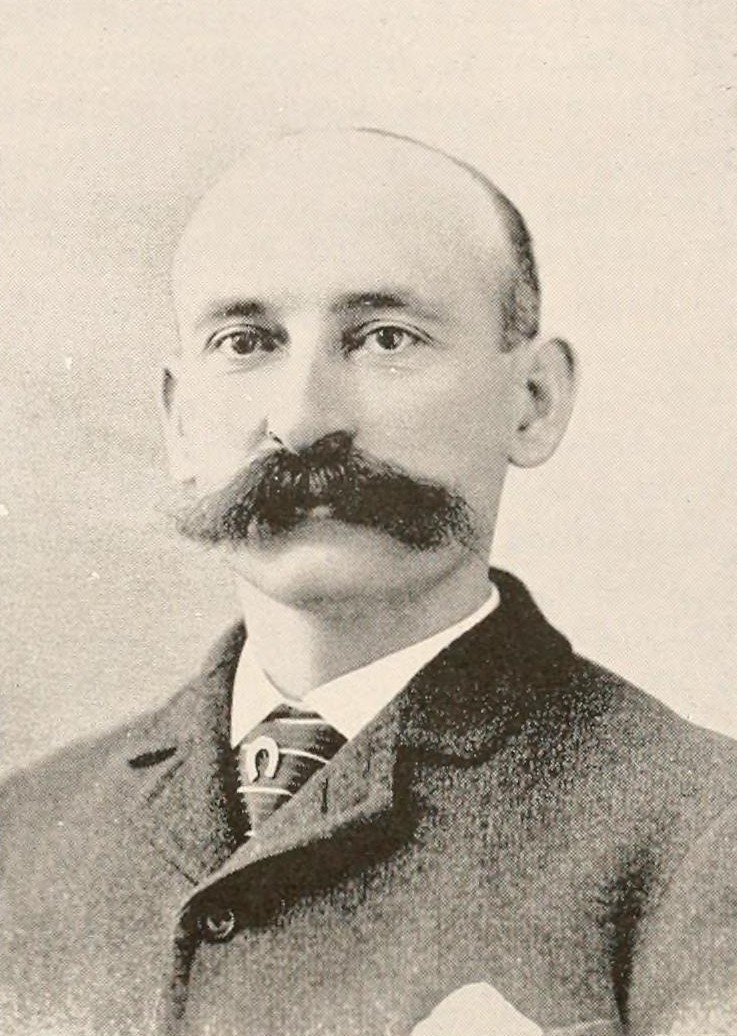
- Charles J. Bateman, circa 1892
- Born: March 4, 1851; Cambridge, Massachusetts
- Died: May 3, 1940 (aged 89); Newtonville, Massachusetts
- Occupation: Architect

2nd & 4th City Architect of Boston
- In office 1888–1889
- Preceded by: Arthur H. Vinal
- Succeeded by: Harrison H. Atwood
- In office 1883–1884
- Preceded by: George A. Clough
- Succeeded by: Arthur H. Vinal

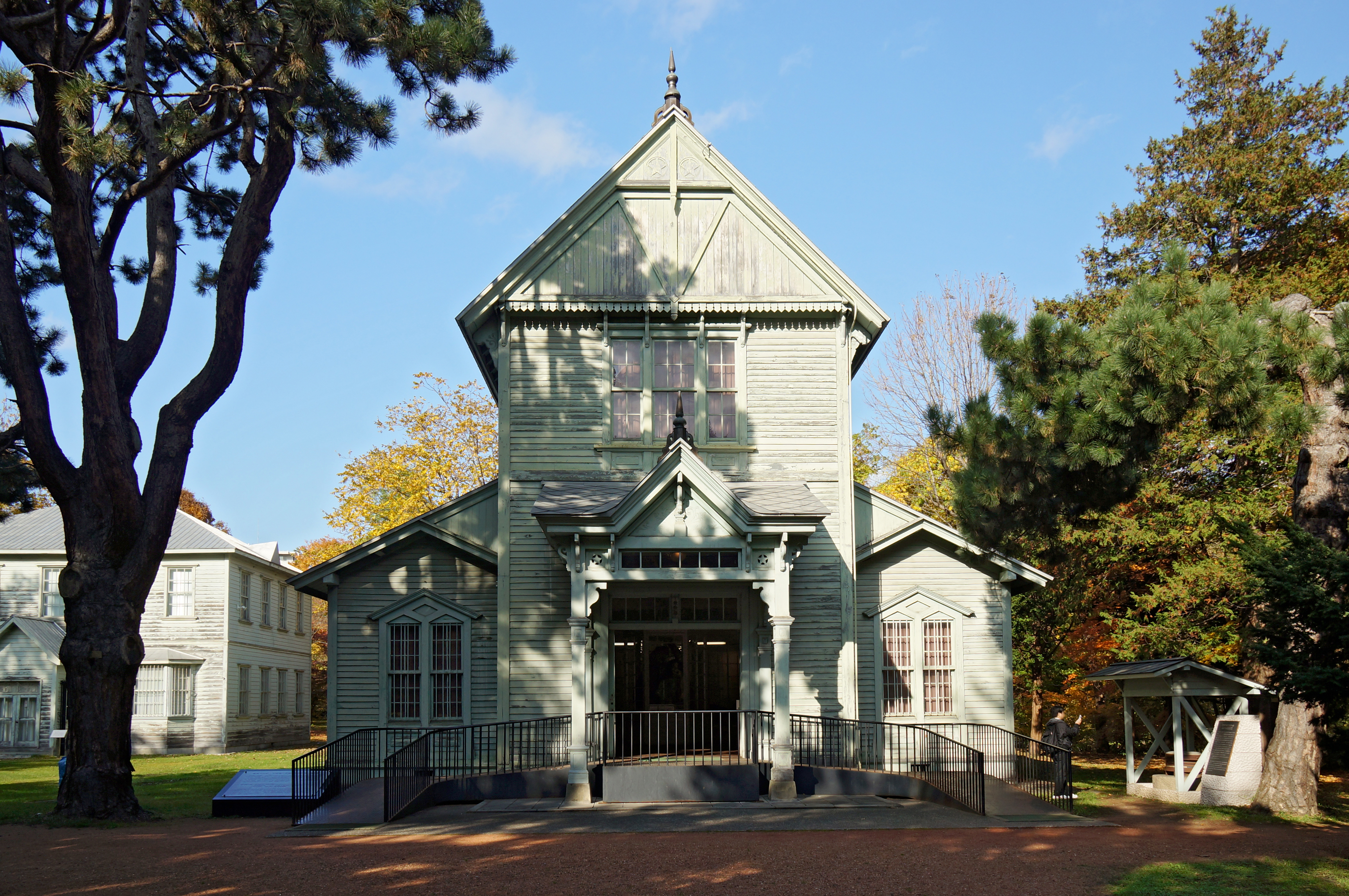
The Natural History Museum of Hokkaido University, designed by Bateman and completed in 1882.

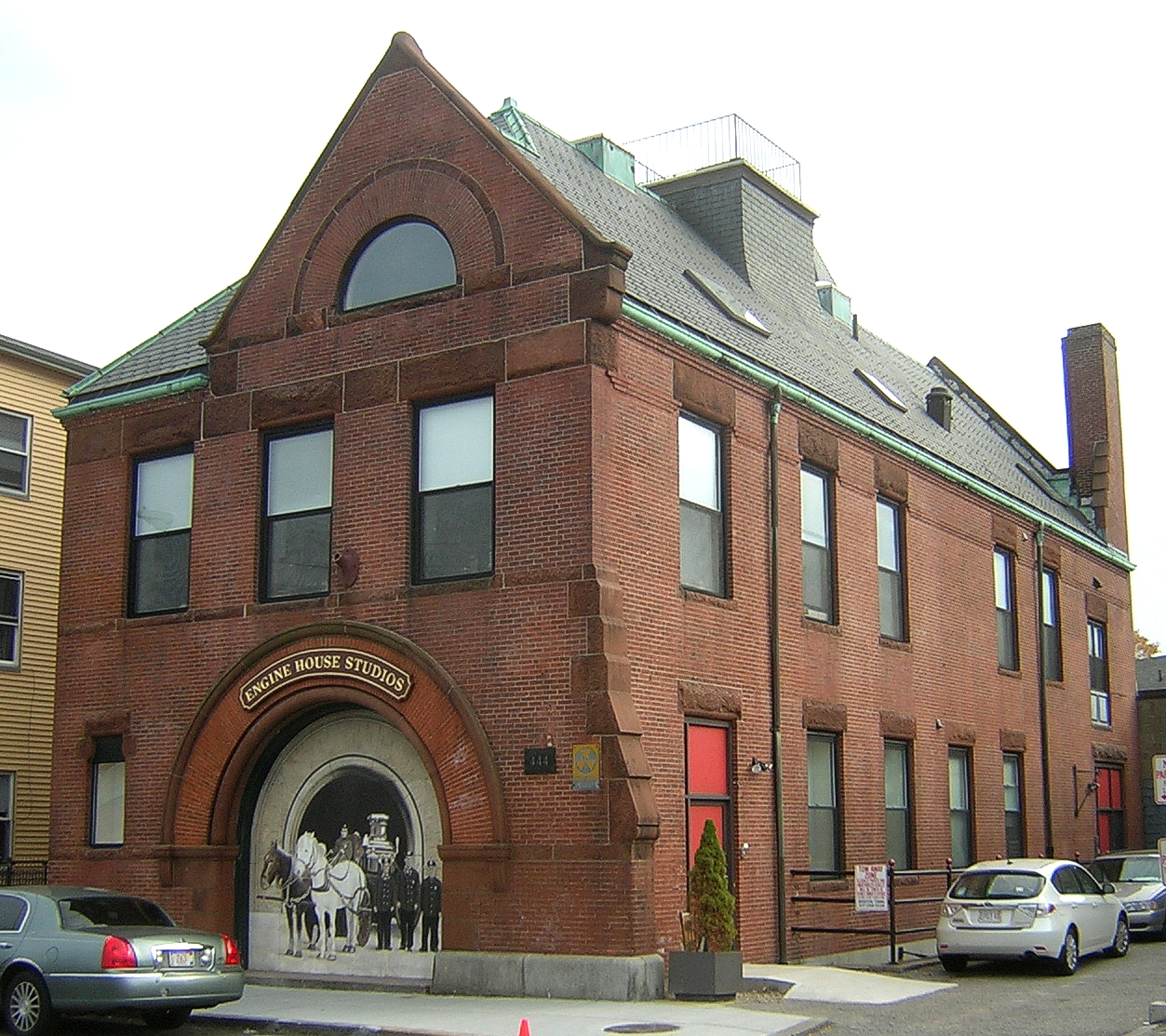
Engine House No. 34 in Brighton, designed by Bateman as city architect and completed in 1889.

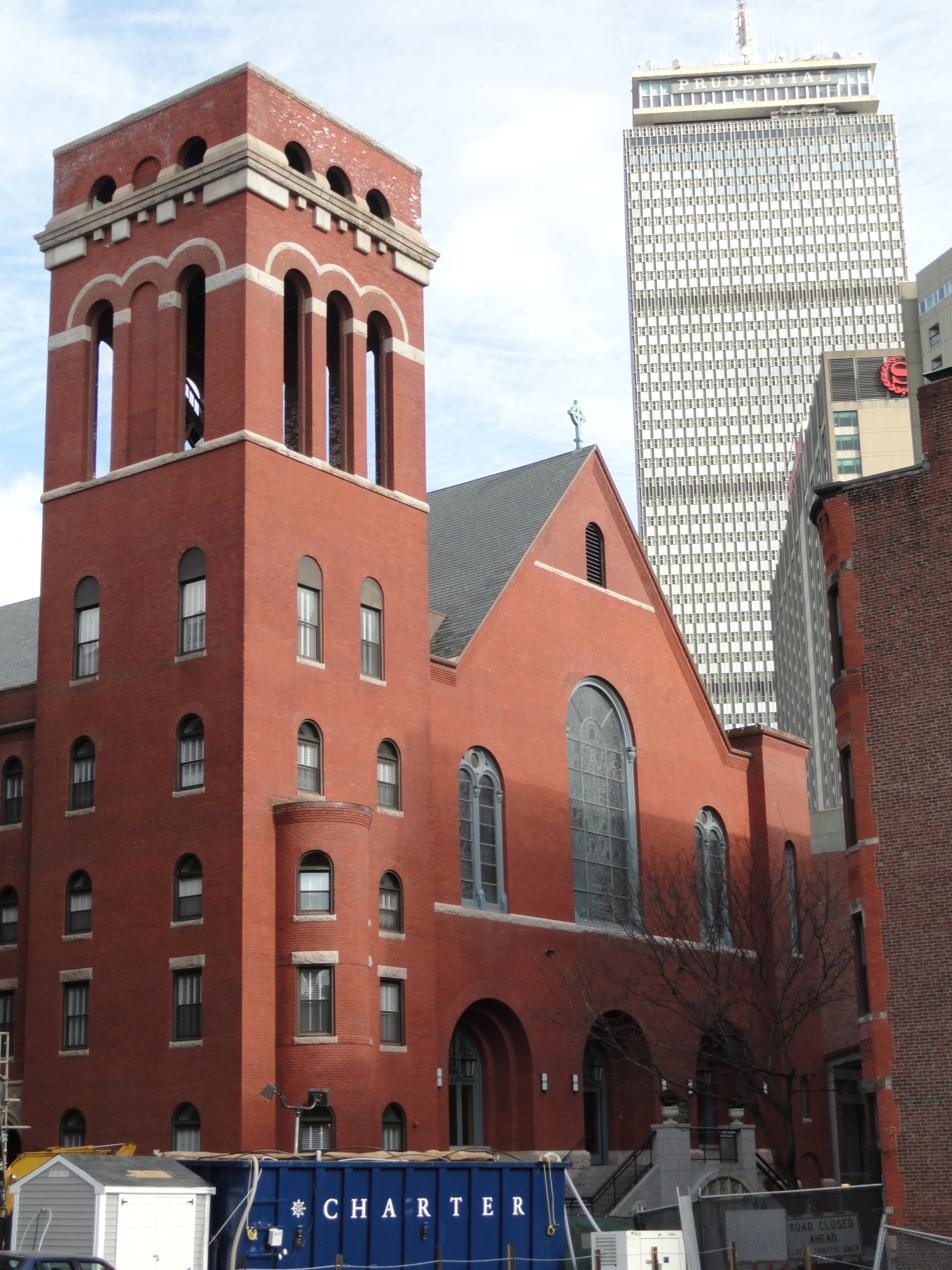
St. Cecilia Catholic Church in Boston, designed by Bateman and completed in 1894.

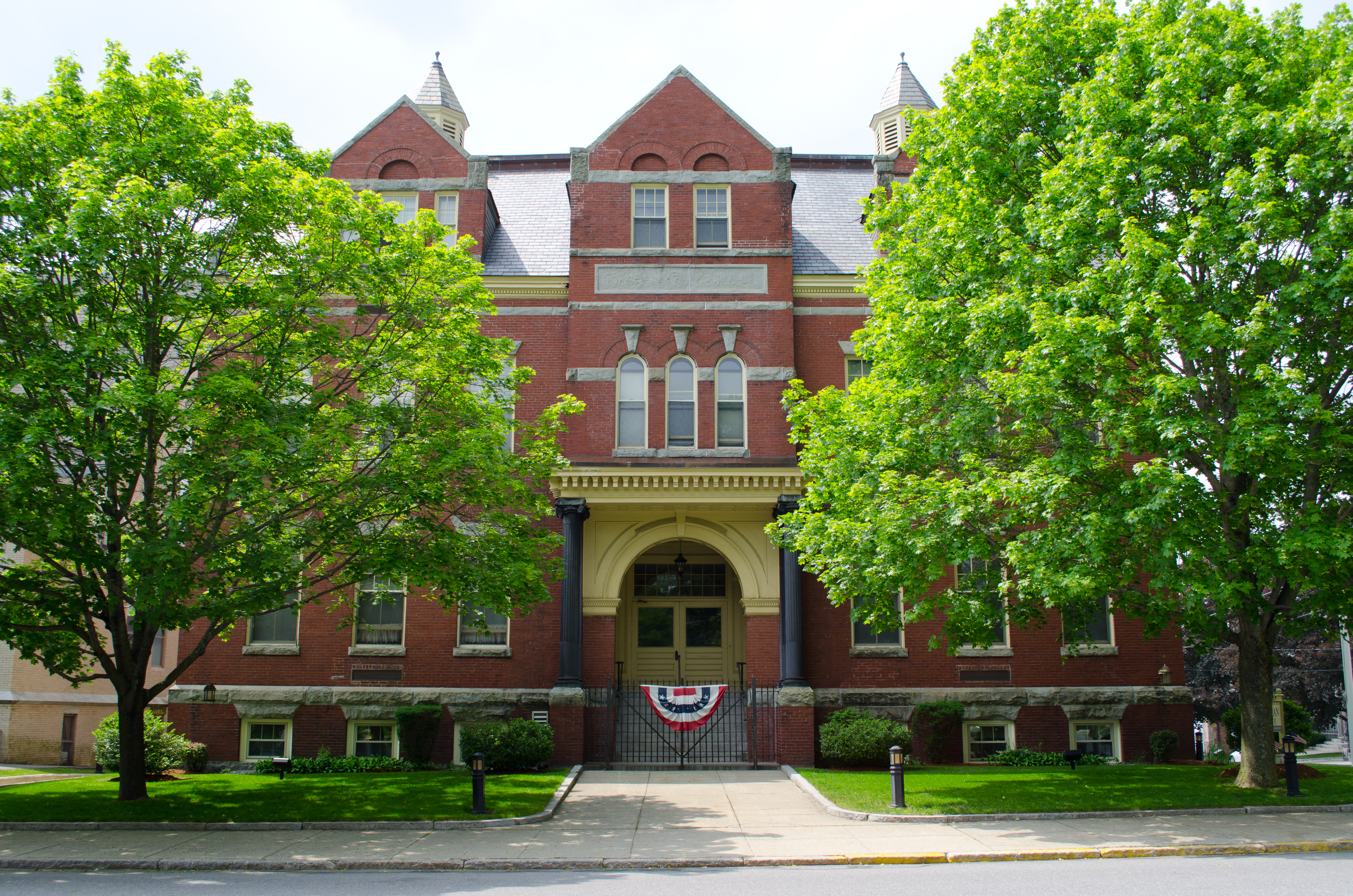
The former Corcoran School in Clinton, designed by Bateman and completed in 1900.

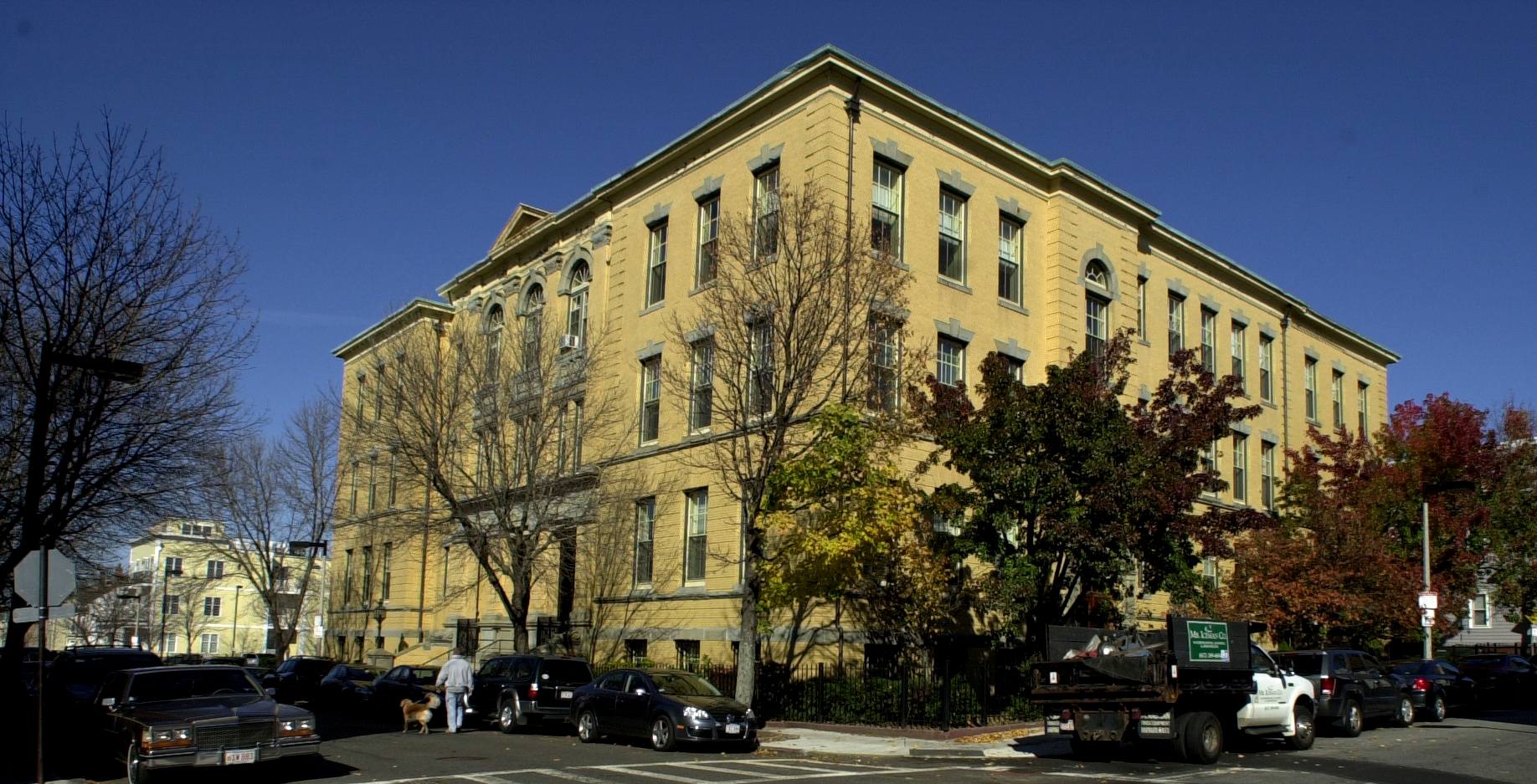
The Bigelow School in South Boston, designed by Bateman and completed in 1903.

Charles J. Bateman (March 4, 1851 – May 3, 1940) was an American architect in practice in Boston from 1876 until his retirement in 1932. He served two terms as city architect of Boston, in 1883–84 and 1888–89.

== Life and career ==
Charles John Bateman was born March 4, 1851, in Cambridge, Massachusetts. He was educated in the Cambridge public schools and at the Massachusetts Institute of Technology, where he took courses in 1868–69 with the class of 1872. He then worked for Boston architects Faulkner & Clarke, spending part of that time in their second office in Chicago, and then worked for architect George Ropes in Boston. In 1876 Bateman left Ropes to open his own office.

Bateman was an Irish Catholic and a Democrat, and both of these attributes would impact his architectural career. As a well-connected member of the local Irish Catholic community Bateman was chosen to design Catholic churches and institutions throughout the Boston area, and by 1877 was being considered as the Democratic candidate for the office of Boston city architect, the holder of which had charge of all architectural work required by the city. He was first elected to that office in 1883, replacing Republican George A. Clough. He served only one term before being replaced by Arthur H. Vinal.

In 1885 the city charter was amended such that the city architect was appointed directly by the mayor. By 1887 Vinal was frequently the object of criticism by Democrats, and in 1888 mayor Hugh O'Brien, a Democrat who had been chair of the board of aldermen when Bateman was first elected, reappointed him. The board of aldermen rejected this appointment in a meeting on April 2, 1888. Five months later this was reconsidered, and he was confirmed on September 24, 1888. Bateman again only served one term before being replaced by Harrison H. Atwood.

When the office of city architect was abolished in 1895 private architects were hired for city work, and Bateman was assigned several of these projects. He designed two additional public schools, a library branch and altered a number of existing city buildings. He also designed several schools in towns outside of the city. Bateman returned to city government in 1902 when he was appointed consulting architect to the department of public buildings by superintendent Hugh Montague, himself an appointee of Democratic mayor Patrick Collins. He remained in this role until Republican mayor George A. Hibbard reorganized city government in 1908. Bateman practiced architecture until 1932, when he retired.

All of Bateman's known works are in Massachusetts with few exceptions. Most prominently, in 1880 he was hired by the Hokkaidō Development Commission to prepare plans for a natural history museum at Sapporo on Hokkaidō in Japan. Why Bateman was chosen is unknown, but he was likely recommended by one of the many New Englanders who were advising the commission. He produced a stick style design for this building, which was completed in 1882. The museum and its collections were transferred to the Sapporo Agricultural College in 1884, is now administered as part of the Hokkaido University Botanical Gardens and has been designated an Important Cultural Property.

== Personal life ==
Bateman was married to Mary A. Bonner. One son, Charles J. Bateman Jr., was a long-time president of the Somerville Savings Bank. During his career Bateman lived in several places around Boston, and died May 3, 1940, at his home in Newtonville at the age of 89.

Bateman was a long-time member of the Boston Society of Architects and at the time of his death was noted as one of its oldest members.

== Architectural works ==
- 1878 – Home for Aged Poor, (Note: Demolished.) 424 Dudley St, Roxbury, Boston
- 1878 – St. Raphael's Catholic Church, (Note: Burned in 1887.) Thomas St, Dedham, Massachusetts
- 1881 – St. Francis de Sales Catholic Church rectory, 303 Bunker Hill St, Charlestown, Boston
- 1882 – Natural History Museum, Hokkaido University Botanical Gardens, Sapporo, Japan
- 1883 – Engine House No. 32, (Note: Designed by Bateman as city architect.) 442 Bunker Hill St, Charlestown, Boston
- 1883 – Harbor View Street School, Harbor View St and Dorchester Ave, Dorchester, Boston
- 1883 – Benjamin Pope School (former), 110 O St, South Boston, Boston
- 1884 – St. Mary's Catholic School, Stillman and N Margin Sts, Boston
- 1885 – Most Precious Blood Catholic Church, 25 Maple St, Hyde Park, Boston
- 1887 – St. Catherine's Catholic Church, 49 Vine St, Charlestown, Boston
- 1889 – Charles H. Burke house, 1 Prospect St, Nashua, New Hampshire
- 1889 – Engine House No. 34, (Note: Listed on the United States National Register of Historic Places.) 444 Western Ave, Brighton, Boston
- 1889 – Memorial Tablets, Winthrop Square, Charlestown, Boston
- 1889 – Home for the Aged, 186 Highland Ave, Somerville, Massachusetts
- 1890 – Tomb, Mount Benedict Cemetery, West Roxbury, Boston
- 1891 – Carney Hospital expansion, 40 Old Harbor St, South Boston, Boston
- 1891 – St. Francis de Sales Catholic School (former), 343 Bunker Hill St, Charlestown, Boston
- 1894 – St. Cecilia Catholic Church, 18 Belvidere St, Boston
- 1900 – Corcoran School, 40 Walnut St, Clinton, Massachusetts
- 1901 – St. Francis de Sales Catholic Church convent, 325 Bunker Hill St, Charlestown, Boston
- 1903 – Bigelow School, 350 W 4th St, South Boston, Boston
- 1904 – Boston Public Library, Codman Square branch (former), 6 Norfolk St, Dorchester, Boston
- 1913 – John D. Philbrick School, 40 Philbrick St, Roslindale, Boston
- 1923 – John Lothrop Motley School addition, 141 Savin Hill Ave, Dorchester, Boston
