= Globe Theatre, Boston =

Globe Theatre, Boston may refer to:

- Globe Theatre, Boston (1871), Boston, Massachusetts
- Globe Theatre, Boston (1903), Boston, Massachusetts
