= WBPG =

WBPG may refer to:

- WBPG-LP, a low-power radio station (102.9 FM) licensed to serve Dorchester, Massachusetts, United States
- WFNA (TV), a television station (channel 25, virtual 55) licensed to serve Gulf Shores, Alabama, United States, which held the call sign WBPG from 2001 to 2009
