= WBCA-LP =

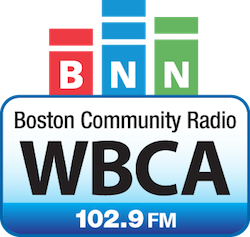

Boston, Massachusetts; United States
- Broadcast area: Greater Boston
- Frequency: 102.9 MHz
- Branding: WBCA 102.9 FM

Programming
- Format: Community radio

Ownership
- Owner: City of Boston
- Operator: Boston Neighborhood Network

History
- First air date: May 2016

Technical information
- Licensing authority: FCC
- Facility ID: 194505
- Class: Low-power FM
- ERP: 14 watts
- HAAT: 78.2972 meters (256.881 ft)
- Transmitter coordinates: 42°18′56.36″N 71°5′53.17″W

Links
- Public license information: LMS
- Webcast: Listen live
- Website: bnnmedia.org/programming/radio

WBCA-LP (102.9 FM) is a low-power radio station (LPFM) in Boston, Massachusetts. The station operates as a partnership of the Boston Neighborhood Network and the city of Boston.

== History ==
In 2013, for the first time in ten years, the Federal Communications Commission (FCC) opened applications for LPFM radio licenses to community and civic organizations. The City of Boston applied for the license to provide a source of news and information to Boston residents, including public safety programming and any local or regional emergency information. Boston was granted a license-to-construct permit in 2015 for a new FCC LPFM radio station.

== Timeshare ==
Because multiple qualified community organizations applied for the one available LPFM license for the Boston market, a sharing agreement was created under FCC guidelines. WBCA-LP uses 102.9 MHz from 6 p.m. to 2 a.m.; Lasell College operates WLAS-LP from 10 a.m. to 6 p.m., and Global Ministries Christian Church operates WBPG-LP from 2 a.m. to 10 a.m.
