= Engine House No. 34 (Boston, Massachusetts) =

- U.S. National Register of Historic Places
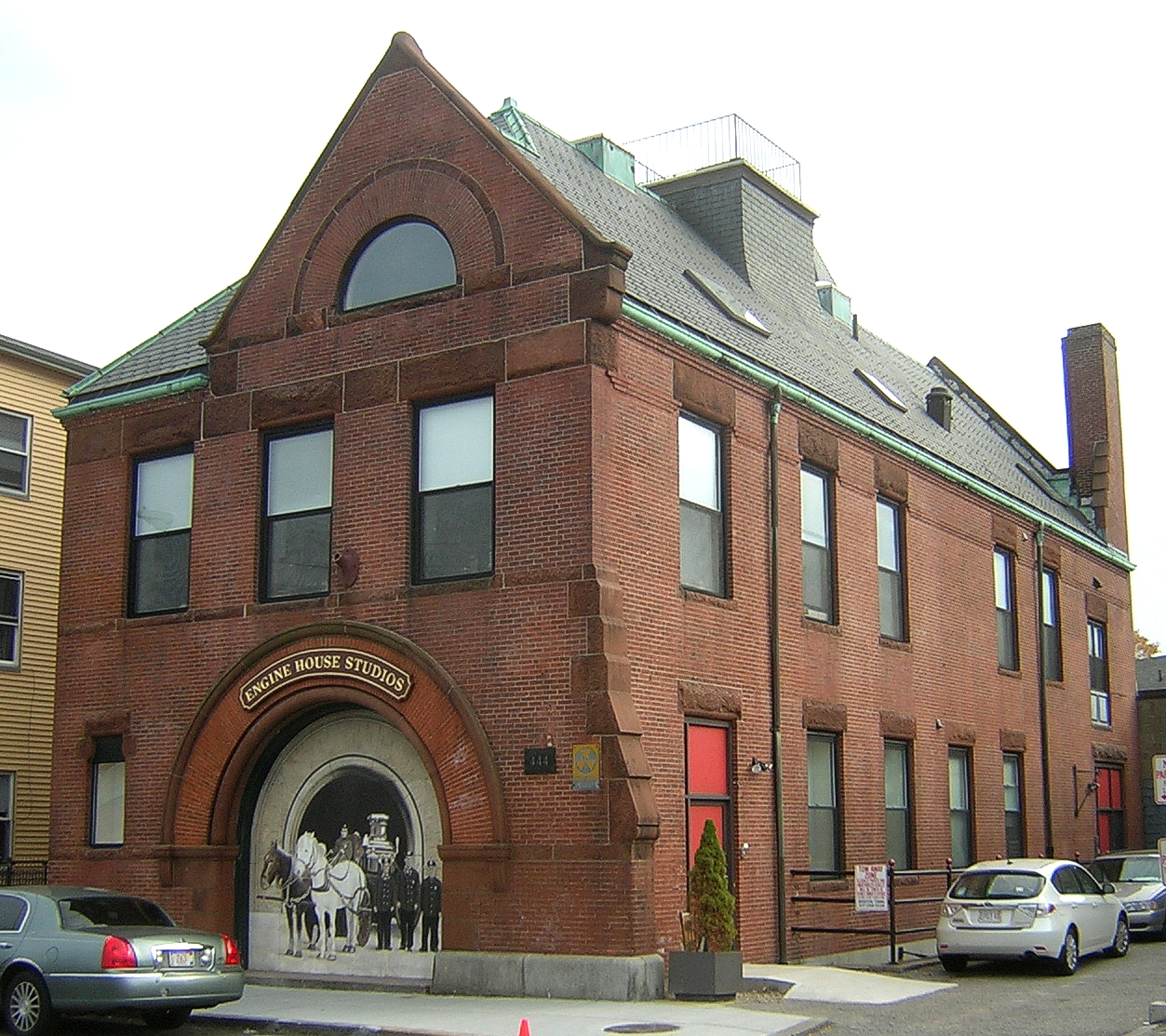

- Location within Massachusetts Location within the United States
- Location: 444 Western Ave. Boston, Massachusetts
- Coordinates: 42°21′44.2″N 71°8′28.3″W
- Built: 1887
- Architect: Charles J. Bateman
- Architectural style: Queen Anne; Richardson Romanesque
- NRHP reference No.: 85003375
- Added to NRHP: October 24, 1985

Engine House No. 34 is a historic fire station at 444 Western Avenue near the corner of Waverly Street in the Brighton neighborhood of Boston, Massachusetts. The station, a 2 1/2-story brick and brownstone structure, was designed by Charles J. Bateman and built in 1888. It is one of a small number of Richardson Romanesque structures in the neighborhood, and features an engine entrance recessed behind a large round arch set asymmetrically on the main facade. The roof is gabled, although it has a hipped section above, with a large hipped projection to the left.

The building was listed on the National Register of Historic Places in 1985.

== See also ==
- National Register of Historic Places listings in northern Boston, Massachusetts
