= Calais Free Library =

Public library in Calais, Maine, U.S.

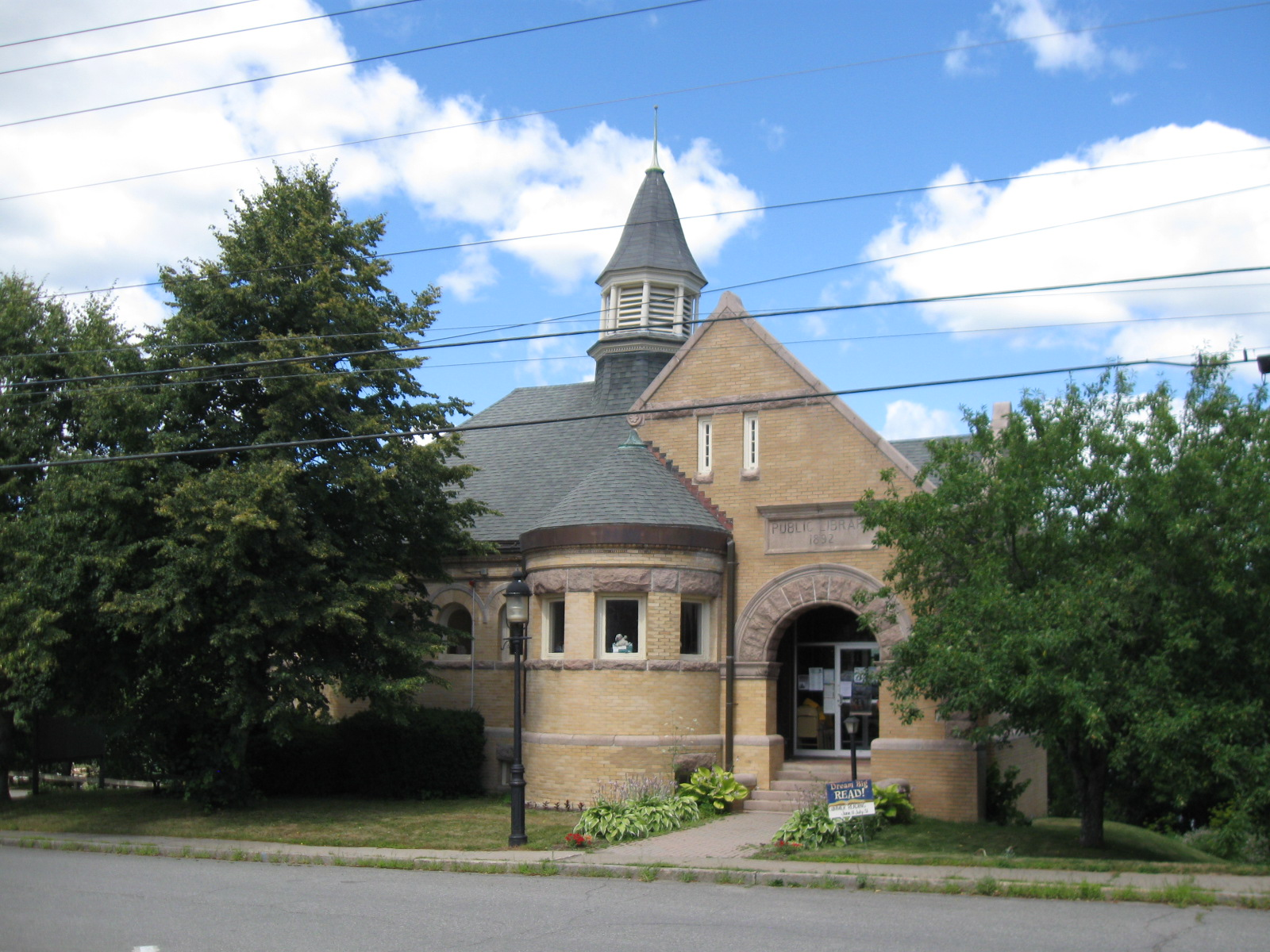
- Location: 9 Union Street, Calais, Maine, United States
- Type: Public
- Established: 1892

Collection
- Size: 100,000 ft

Access and use
- Circulation: 33,000
- Population served: 3,123

Other information
- Budget: $156,155
- Director: Kathleen Staples
- Employees: 4
- Calais Free Library
- U.S. National Register of Historic Places
- Area: less than one acre
- Built: 1892
- Architect: Arthur H. Vinal
- Architectural style: Romanesque
- MPS: Maine Public Libraries MPS
- NRHP reference No.: 01000370
- Added to NRHP: April 12, 2001

Calais Free Library is the public library in Calais, Maine, United States. It is located at 9 Union Street, at the edge of the city's business district, in an architecturally distinguished Richardsonian Romanesque building designed by Arthur H. Vinal and completed in 1893, with a major addition in 1984-85. It is listed on the National Register of Historic Places and is also home to an art gallery.

== Architecture and history ==
The Calais Free Library is located at the eastern end of Union Street in downtown Calais, and is set between the street and the St. Croix River. It is a single-story brick building with brownstone trim, topped by a hip roof. The right side of its front (southwest-facing) facade has a tall gable section with a projecting rounded bay on its left and the main entrance recessed under a large round arch. The left side of the main facade consists of a bank of round-arch windows. At the center of the roof an octagonal cupola with louvered sides rises to a bellcast pyramidal roof and finial. Set behind this original building, at a lower elevation due to the sloping lot, is a modern addition, joined to this building's basement by a narrow hyphen. The basic form of the original building is echoed in the addition.

Library services in Calais began with a private subscription service in the 1830s, whose collection was significantly damaged by a fire in 1870. The impetus for the Calais Free Library came from James Shepherd Pike, one of the city's leading citizens, who died in the early 1880s, bequeathing his house to the city for use as a library. Due to the fire in the previous library, the new library's trustees opted to build a new stone building, selling Pike's house and having it moved off the lot. Boston architect Arthur H. Vinal was awarded the contract in 1892, and the new building opened its doors in 1893; it is one of only three of Vinal's commissions in Maine to survive. The 1984-85 addition was designed by WBRC Architects/Engineers of Bangor.

== See also ==
- National Register of Historic Places listings in Washington County, Maine
