= Bigelow School (Boston, Massachusetts) =

- U.S. National Register of Historic Places
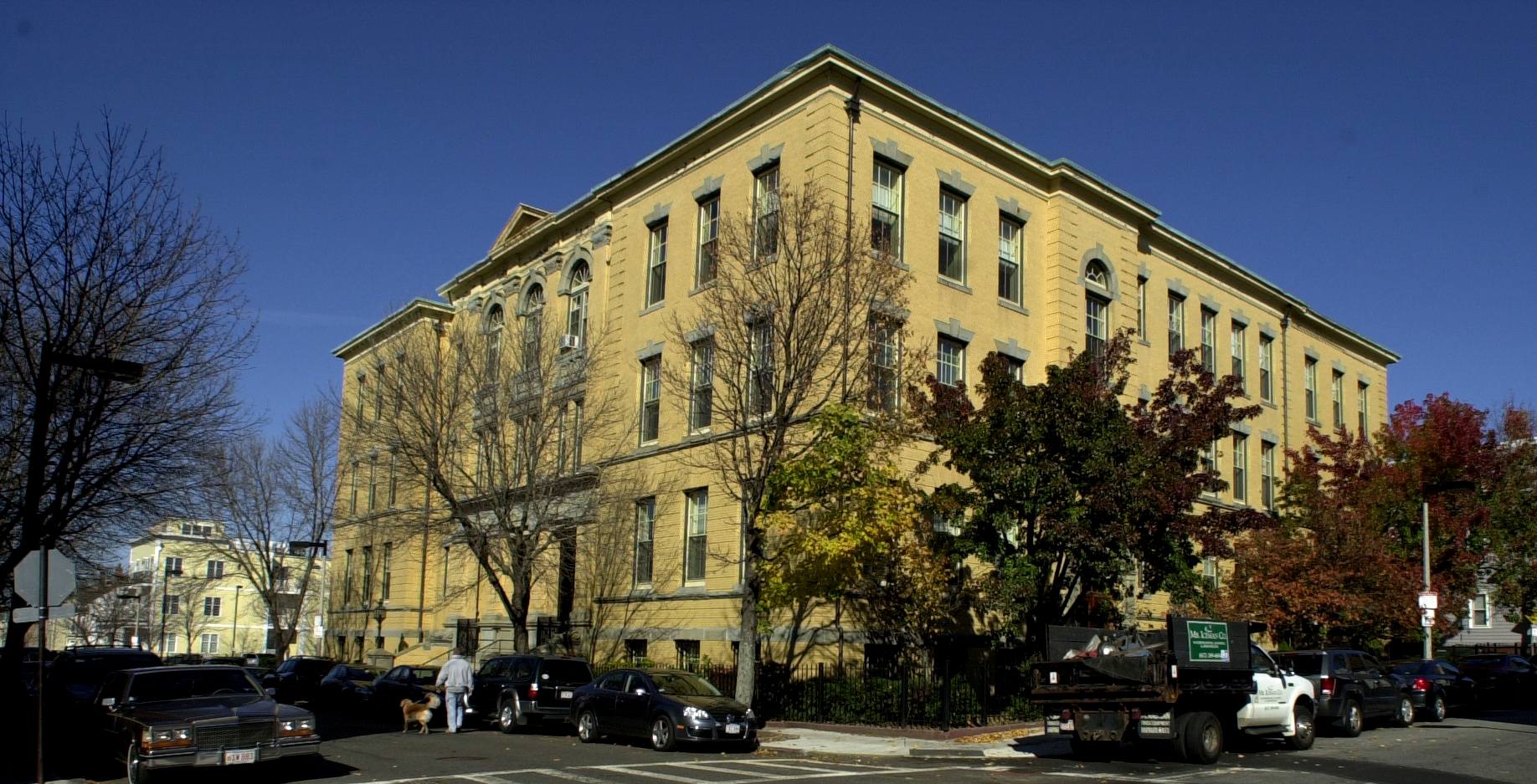

- Location within Massachusetts Location within the United States
- Location: 350 W. 4th St., Boston, Massachusetts
- Coordinates: 42.3374°N 71.0503°W
- Area: 1 acre (0.40 ha)
- Built: 1901
- Architect: Charles J. Bateman
- Architectural style: Classical Revival
- NRHP reference No.: 85000316
- Added to NRHP: February 21, 1985

The Bigelow School is a historic school at 350 West 4th Street in South Boston, Massachusetts. The three-story Classical Revival brick building was designed by Charles J. Bateman and built in 1901. Features include corner quoining, cast concrete window lintels and sills. It was named for John P. Bigelow, mayor of Boston when the first school was built on the site in 1850. It was closed by 1976. The building was converted into apartments in the 1980s and into condos in 1995.

The building was listed on the National Register of Historic Places in 1985, at which time it was vacant.

== See also ==
- National Register of Historic Places listings in southern Boston, Massachusetts
