= Arthur H. Vinal =

American architect (1854–1923)

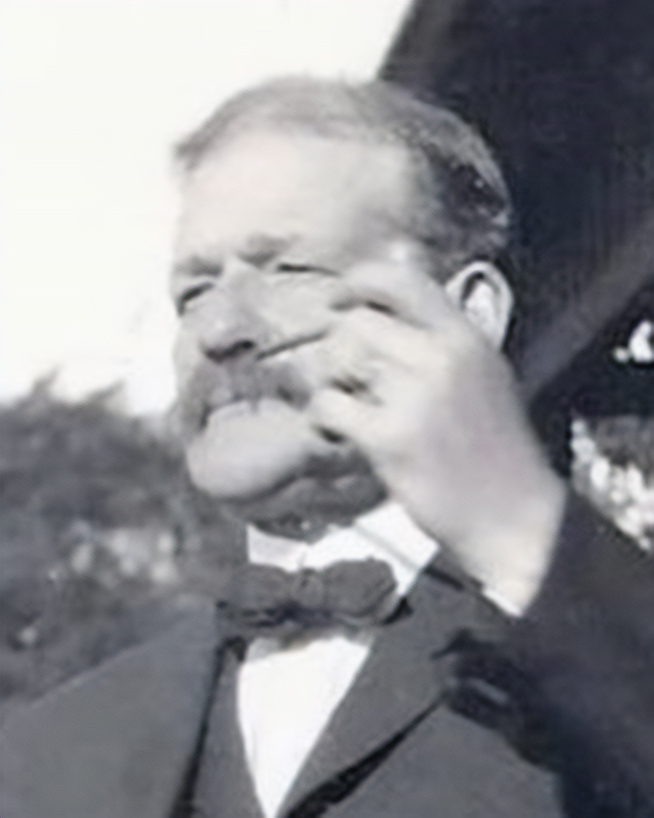
- Born: July 1, 1855; Quincy, Massachusetts, U.S.
- Died: August 25, 1923 (aged 68); West Harpswell, Maine, U.S.
- Occupation: Architect
- Buildings: Calais Free Library; Dorchester Temple Baptist Church; 941–955 Boylston Street

3rd City Architect of Boston
- In office 1884–1888
- Preceded by: Charles J. Bateman
- Succeeded by: Charles J. Bateman

Arthur H. Vinal (July 1, 1855 – August 25, 1923) was an American architect who lived and worked in Boston, Massachusetts. He served as Boston's city architect during 1884–1888.

== Biography ==
Vinal was born in Quincy, Massachusetts, on July 1, 1855, to Howard Vinal and Clarissa J. Wentworth. Vinal apprenticed at the firm of Peabody & Stearns in Boston before leaving to start his own practice in 1875. Vinal started a partnership with Henry F. Starbuck in 1877; the firm broke up when Starbuck moved away. Vinal served as the third City Architect of Boston from 1884 to 1888.

== Works ==
Vinal is principally known for his Richardsonian Romanesque High Service Building at the Chestnut Hill Reservoir (1887). In addition to his other public buildings, Vinal designed numerous residences in Boston and nearby suburbs (not all, or even mostly, romanesques). His other works include:

- Methodist Church, Farmington, Maine (1877)
- Bangor Opera House, Bangor, Maine (1881)
- 23 Warren Avenue, Boston, MA (1881)
- 29 Melville Avenue, Dorchester, MA, shingle style, (1884)
- 35 Melville Avenue, Dorchester, MA was built and designed by and for Arthur H. Vinal in 1882. By 1894, a W.T. Sullivan lived here.
- 37 Melville Avenue, Dorchester, MA was designed by Arthur H. Vinal c. mid 1880s. By 1894, its owner was Sophia B. Adams.
- Mt. Kineo House Hotel, Mount Kineo, Moosehead Lake, Maine (opened July 29, 1884)
- Back Bay fire and police station, 941–955 Boylston Street, Boston (1886, Richardsonian Romanesque) — the former police station is now part of Boston Architectural College
- Fisher Hill Reservoir, Brookline, Massachusetts (1887)
- Dorchester Temple Baptist Church (1889, shingle style)
- Calais Free Library, Calais, Maine (opened July 4, 1893)
- 158–174 St. Botolph Street (even numbers), Boston, MA (1894)
- Apartment building, 492–498 Massachusetts Avenue and 779–781 Tremont Street, South End, Boston (1897)
- 69–113 Gainsborough Street (odd numbers), Boston, MA (1900)
- 114–120 Hemenway Street (even numbers), Boston, MA (1900)
- 76–110 Gainsborough Street (even numbers), Boston, MA (1902)
- Globe Theater (burlesque and later B movie house), later known as the Center and the Pagoda, 690 Washington Street, Boston (1903, French Renaissance)

== Gallery ==
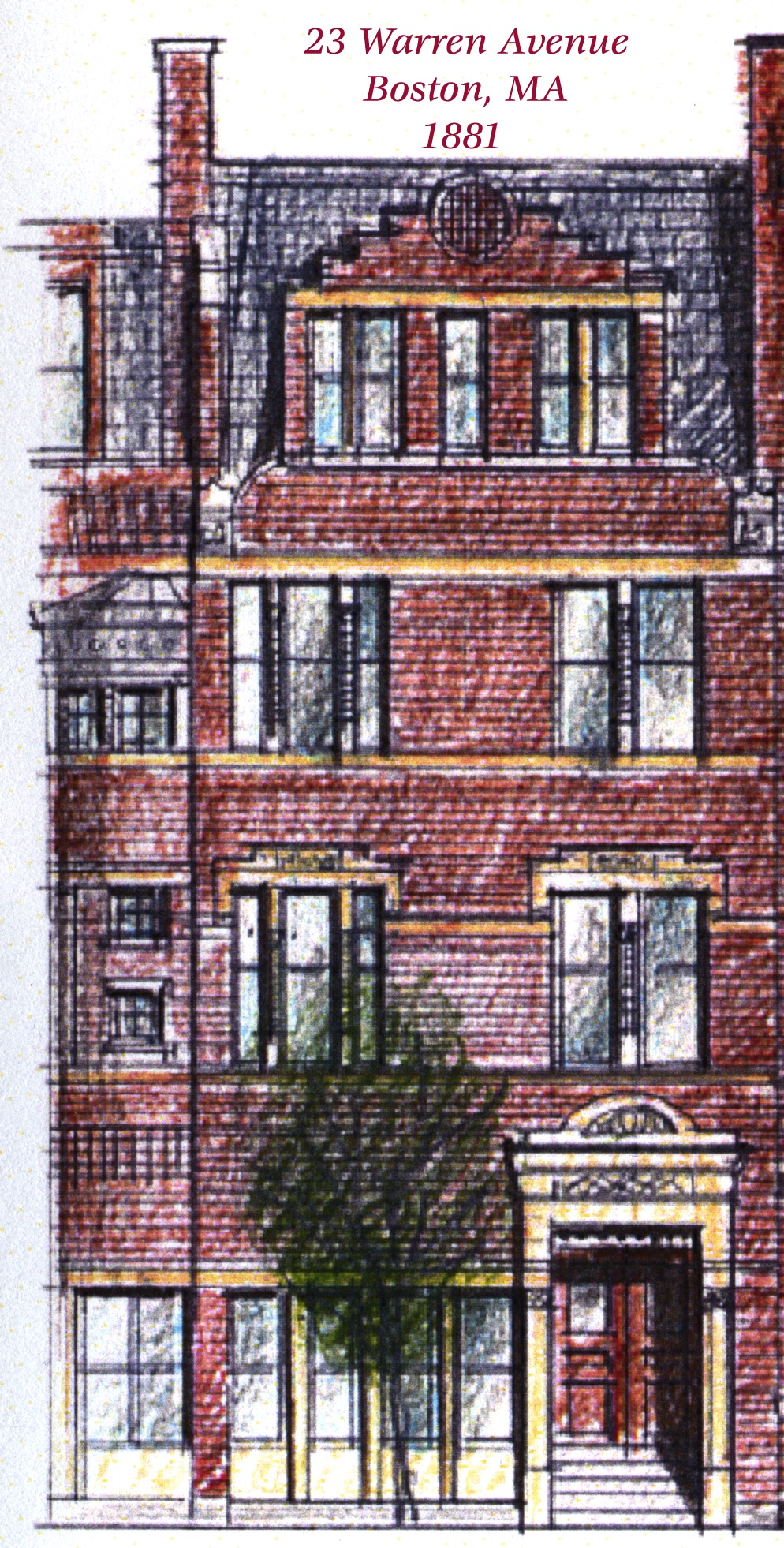
23 Warren Ave (South End) Boston, MA, 1881

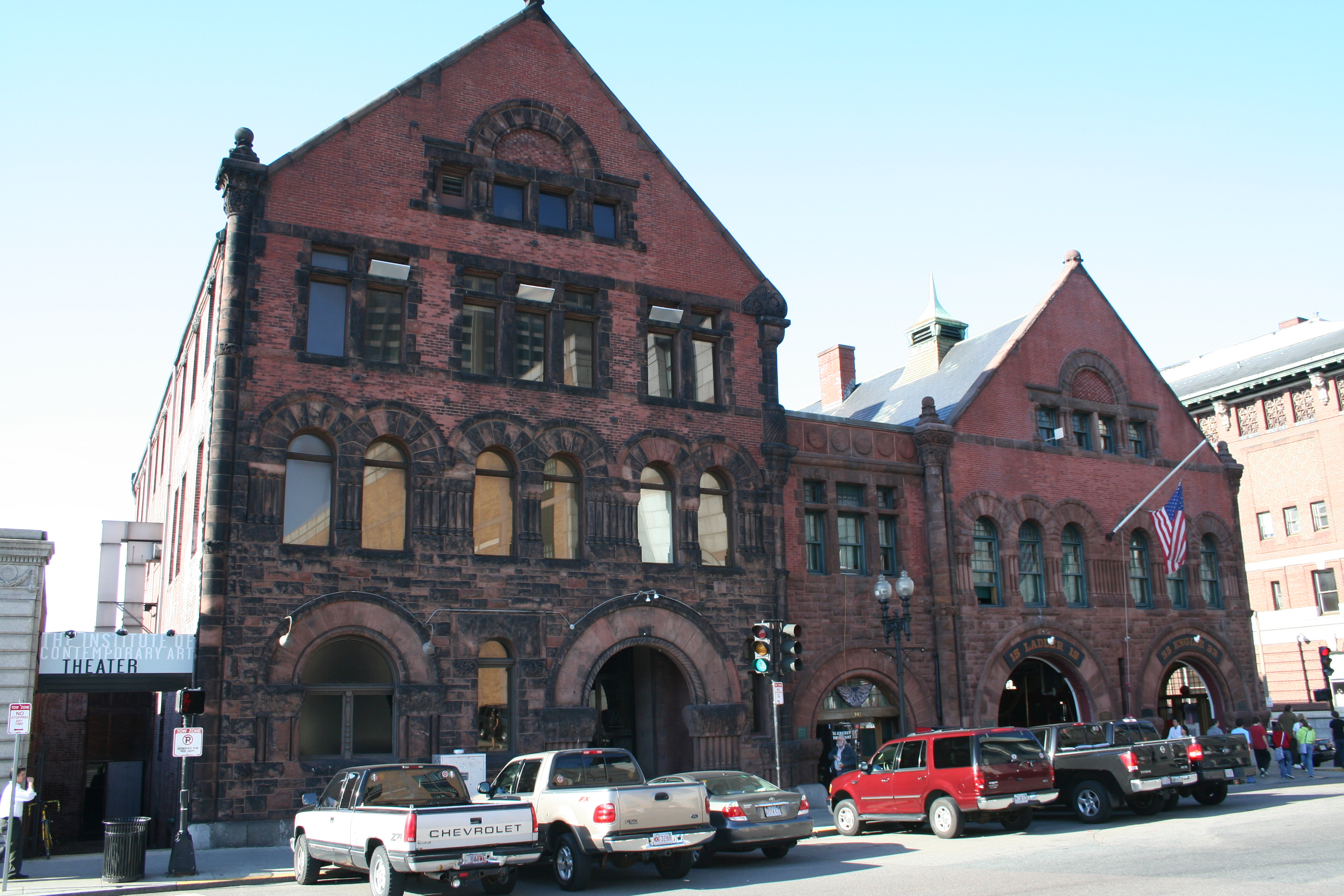
941–955 Boylston Street, Boston, Massachusetts, 1886

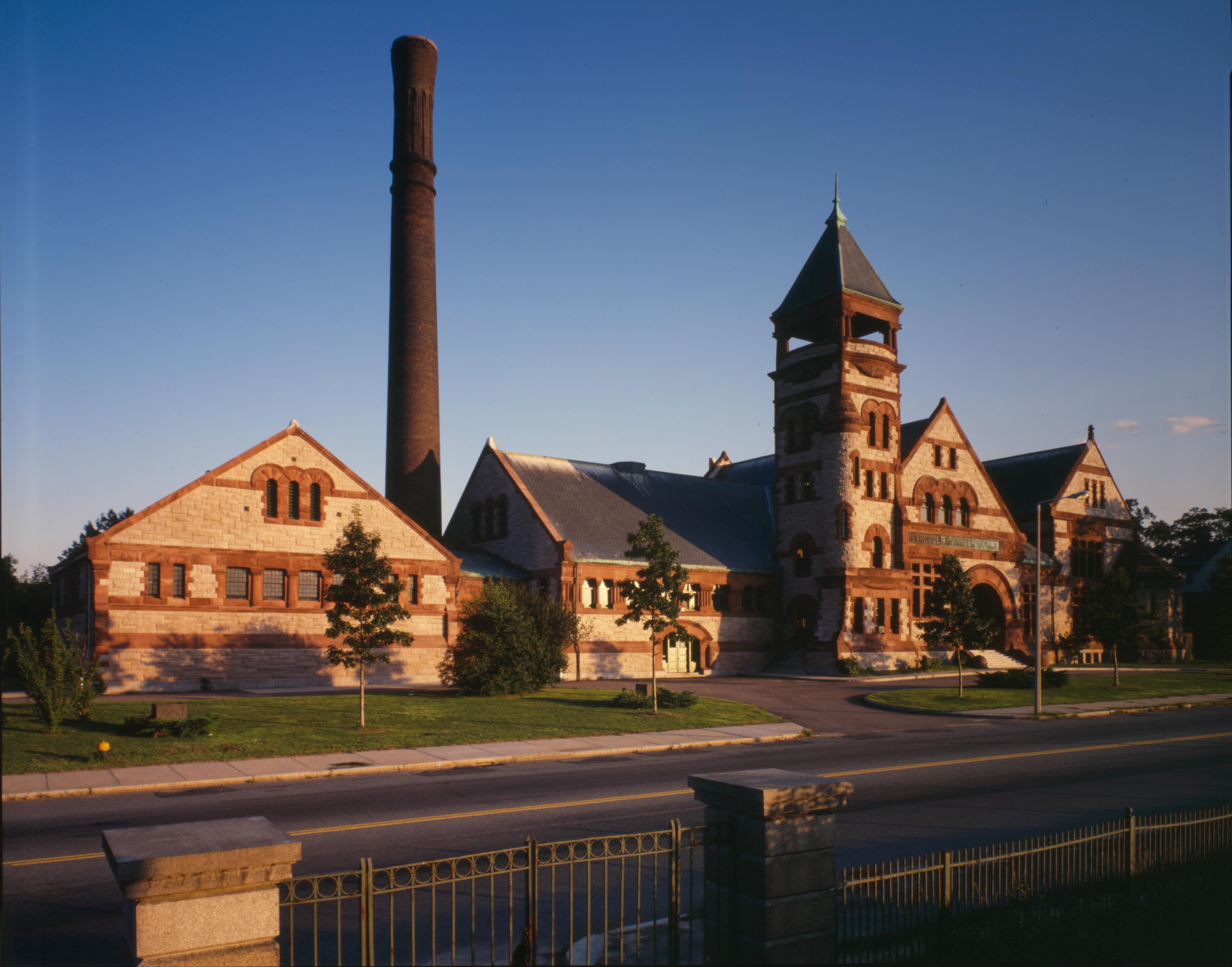
The High Service Building at Chestnut Hill Reservoir, Beacon Street, Boston, Massachusetts, 1887

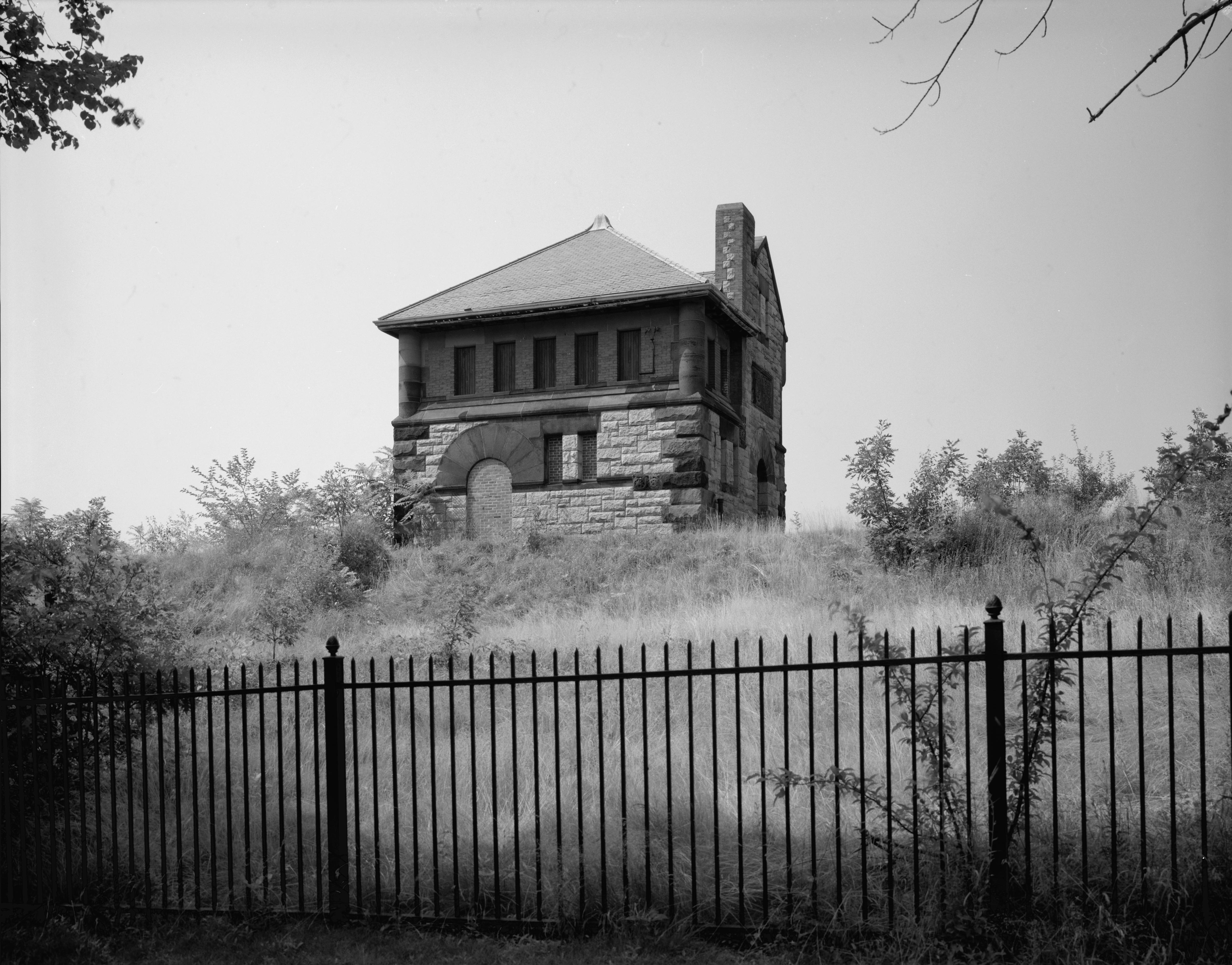
Fisher Hill Reservoir gatehouse, Fisher Avenue, Brookline, Massachusetts, 1887

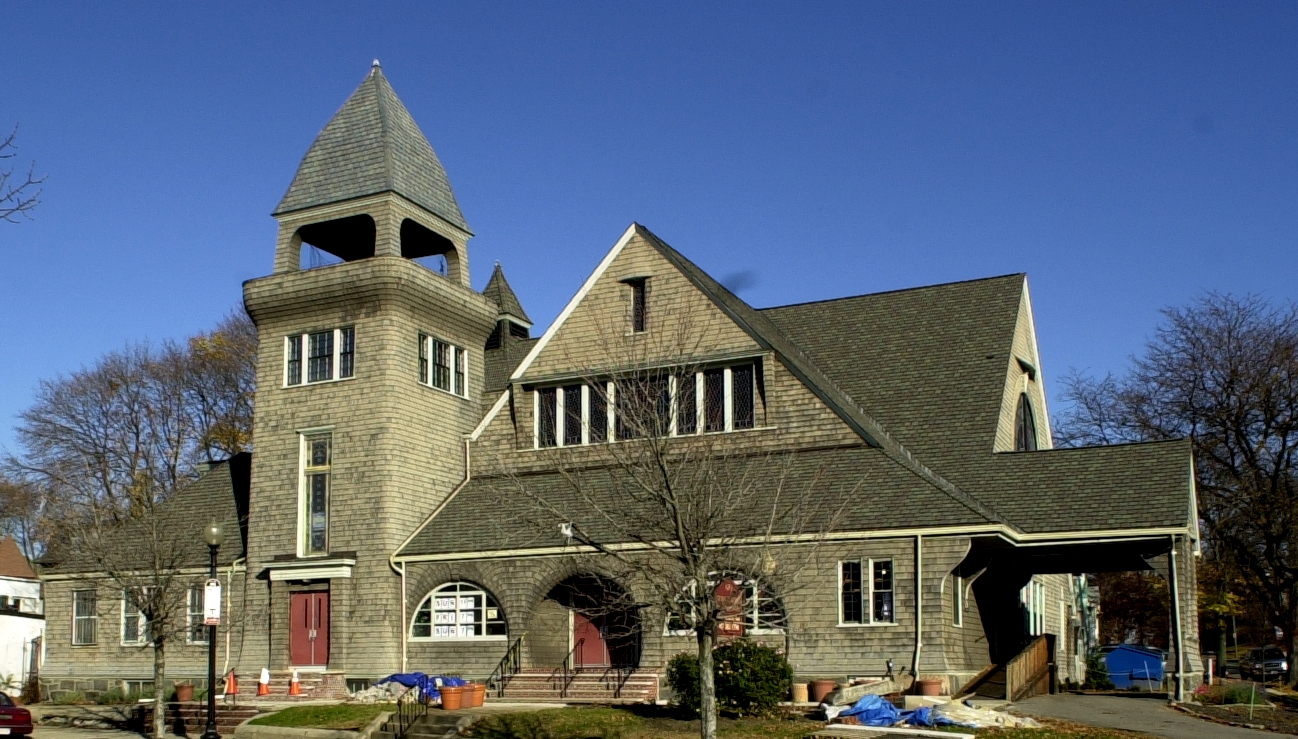
Dorchester Temple Baptist Church, Dorchester, Massachusetts, 1889

== Sources ==
- National Register nomination for Bowditch School, Jamaica Plain
- Biography of Henry F. Starbuck
- Dorchester Atheneum
- History of Chestnut Hill Reservation, Mass. Department of Conservation and Recreation
- Spaulding & Slye Colliers press release
- Ian Grundy. "Center Theatre". Cinema Treasures. Archived from the original on 23 October 2007.
