= Corcoran School =

- U.S. National Register of Historic Places
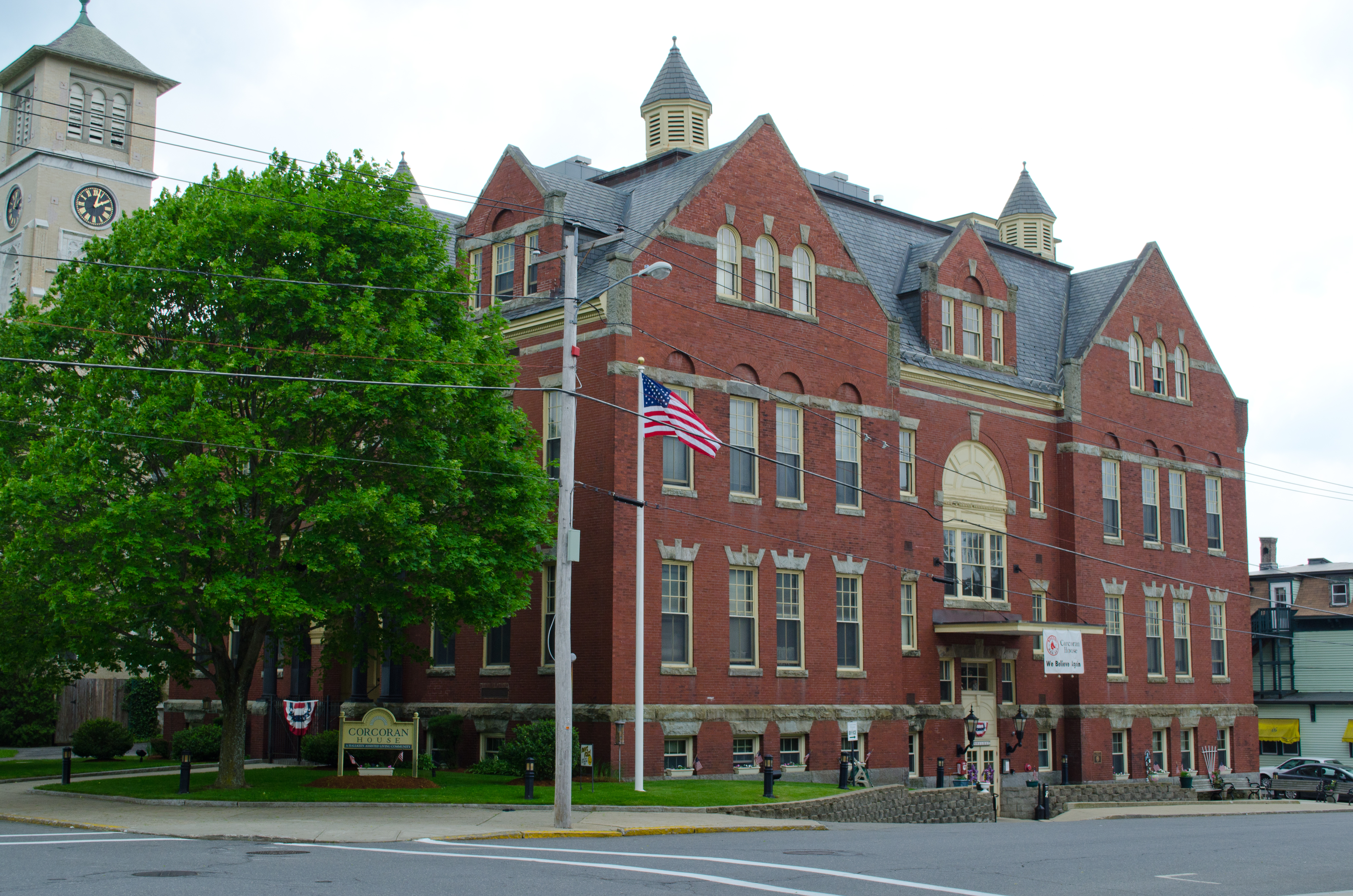

- Location within Massachusetts Location within the United States
- Location: Clinton, Massachusetts
- Coordinates: 42°25′0″N 71°41′3″W
- Architect: Charles J. Bateman
- Architectural style: Colonial Revival, Queen Anne
- NRHP reference No.: 00000039
- Added to NRHP: February 4, 2000

The Corcoran School is an historic school building at 40 Walnut Street in Clinton, Massachusetts. The 2 1/2-story brick Colonial Revival building was built in 1900 to a design by Boston architect Charles J. Bateman. The rectangular building rises above a raised foundation to a truncated hip roof with a variety of gabled dormers and two cupolas. The entry is centered on a seven-bay facade, beneath a slightly projecting pavilion that rises a full three stories. The entry is recessed under a large round arch, above which is a portico supported by Ionic columns. On the second level of the pavilion are three long, narrow, round-arch windows with granite keystones above, and on the third level are two rectangular sash windows topped by blind arches.

On the interior, the building has a basic cruciform plan, with classrooms at the corners, and central corridors running north–south and east–west. On the second floor the east corridor ends in a small room that initially served as a library, above the main entrance. The stairwells on both floors were flanked by narrow rooms, which were used as wardrobes. The third floor contained a large assembly hall, with a stage on the west end.

The school was built in a site that has been used for schools since 1846, the most recent of which, the 1854 high school, was demolished because settling and cracking had rendered it unsafe. The new school had eight classrooms, and was the largest of Clinton's primary schools. The school was dedicated in honor of John Corcoran (1853-1904), a school committee chairman, in 1918. The town used the building as an elementary school until 1980. It has since been sold and converted to residential use.

The building was listed on the National Register of Historic Places in 2000.

== See also ==
- National Register of Historic Places listings in Worcester County, Massachusetts
