= Globe Theatre (Boston, 1903) =

Playhouse and cinema in Boston

Coordinates: 42°21′4.9″N 71°3′46.27″W

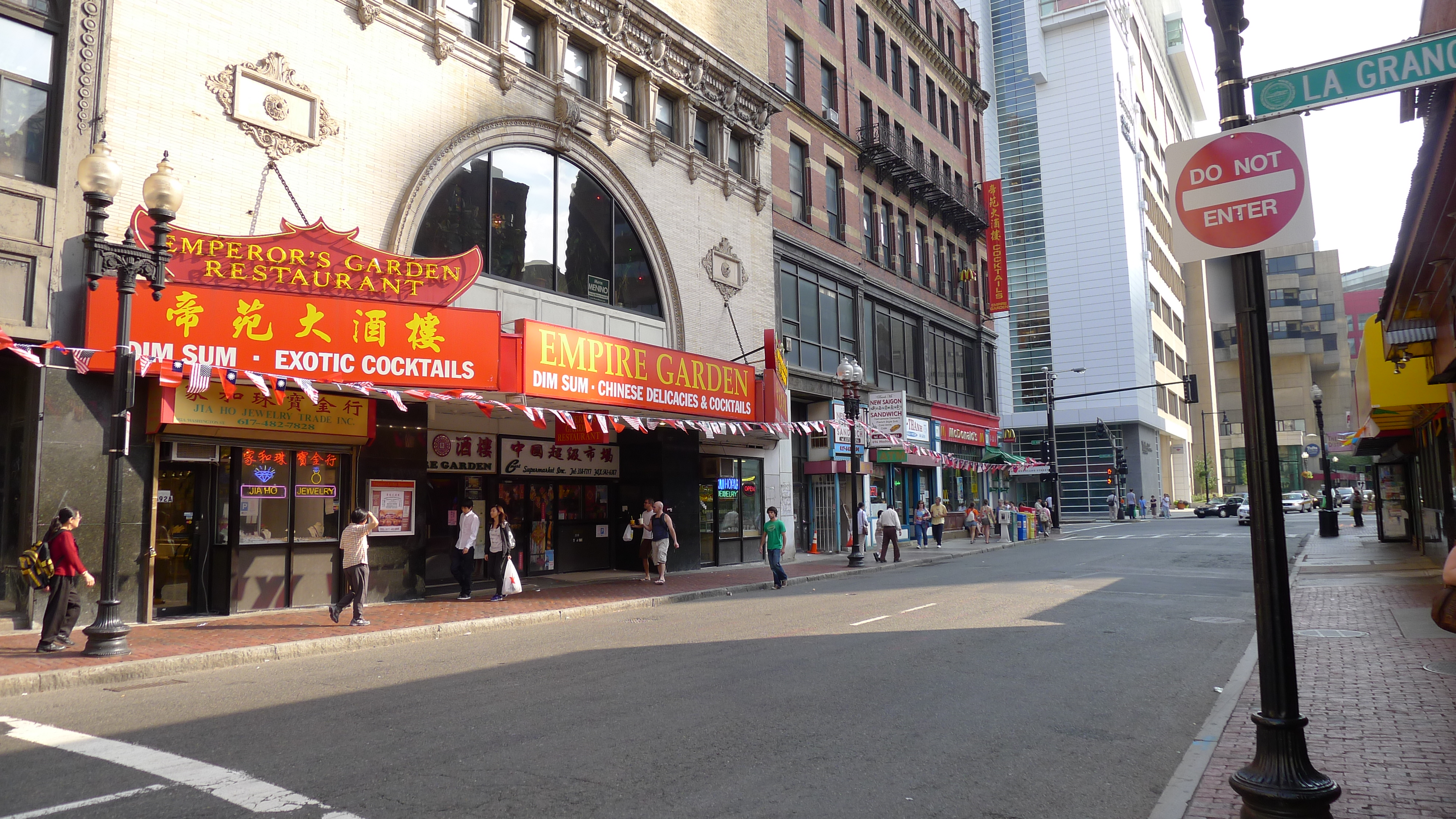
The Globe Theatre building, Boston, in 2010

The Globe Theatre (est. 1903) was a playhouse and cinema in Boston, Massachusetts, located on Washington Street in Chinatown. Architect Arthur H. Vinal designed the building in 1903; it stands today at no.692 Washington St. opposite LaGrange Street, near the corner of Beach Street. In the 1910s it was also known as "Loew's Globe Theatre."

== Performances/Screenings ==
=== 1900s ===
- Weber and Fields' "An English Daisy"
- "In Dahomey," with Williams & Walker
- "Pals," with James J. Corbett
- "Under Southern Skies"
- "1492"

=== 1910s ===
- D.W. Griffith's Intolerance

=== 1920s ===
- Monroe Salisbury and Shirley Mason in "new photoplays"
- Smilin' Through

== Images ==
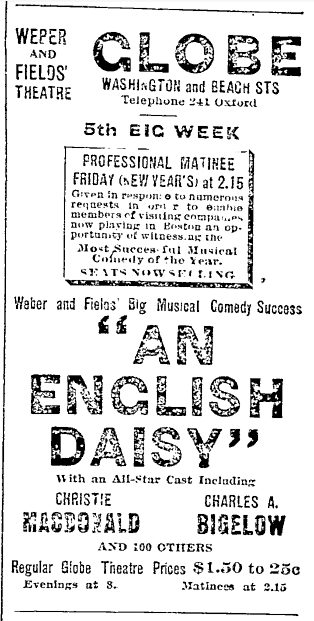
Advertisement for Weber & Fields, 1903

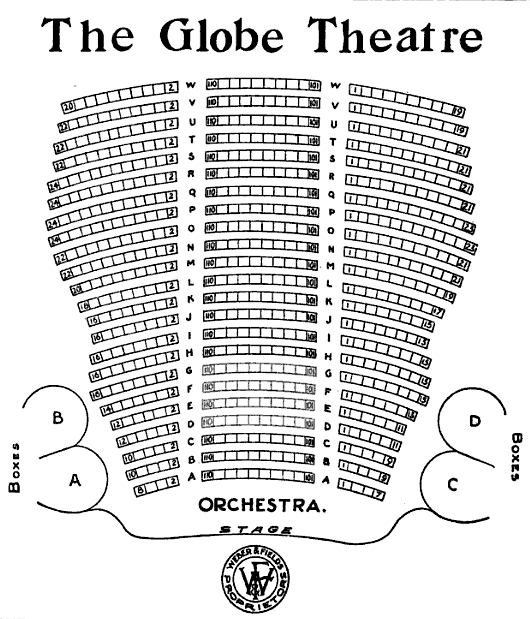
Seating chart of orchestra level, 1904

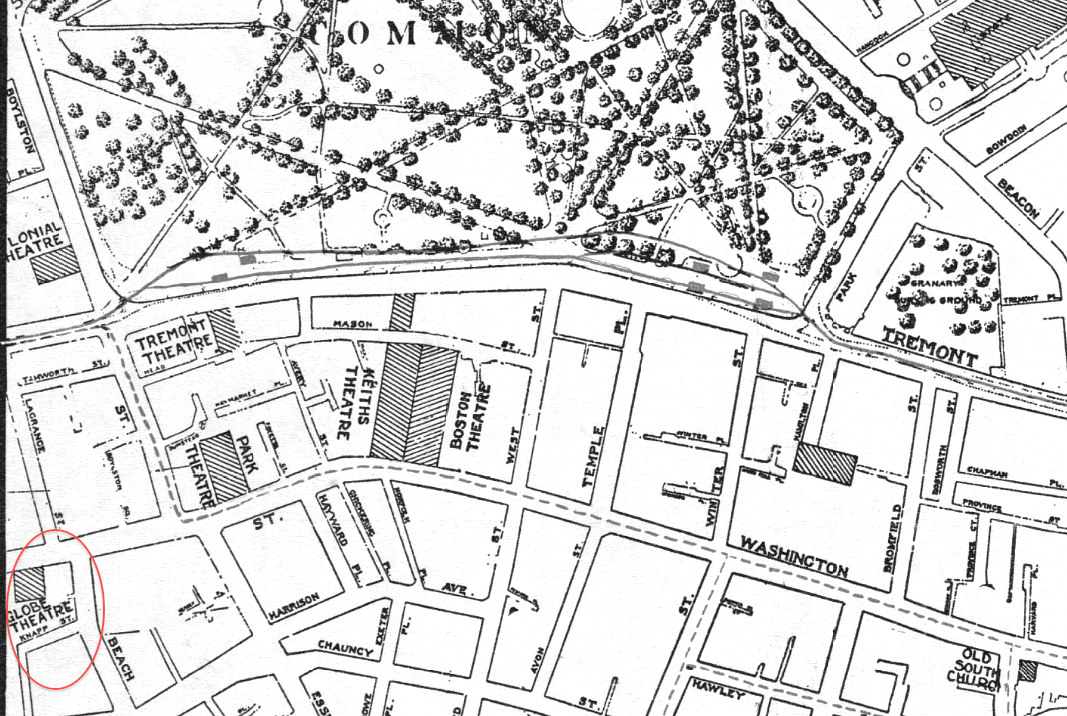
Detail of 1911 map of Boston, showing Globe Theatre at corner of Beach St. and Washington St.

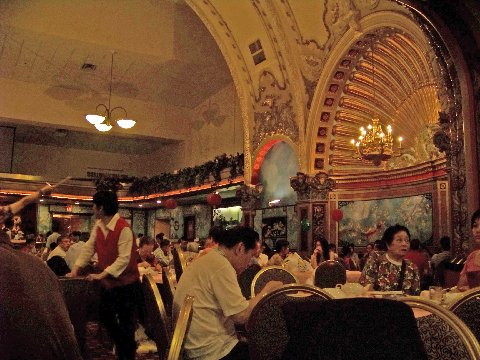
Interior of the building in 2008, now a restaurant
