= Hokkaido University Botanic Garden =

Botanical garden in Sapporo, Japan

Coordinates: 43°3′49.2″N 141°20′32.9″E

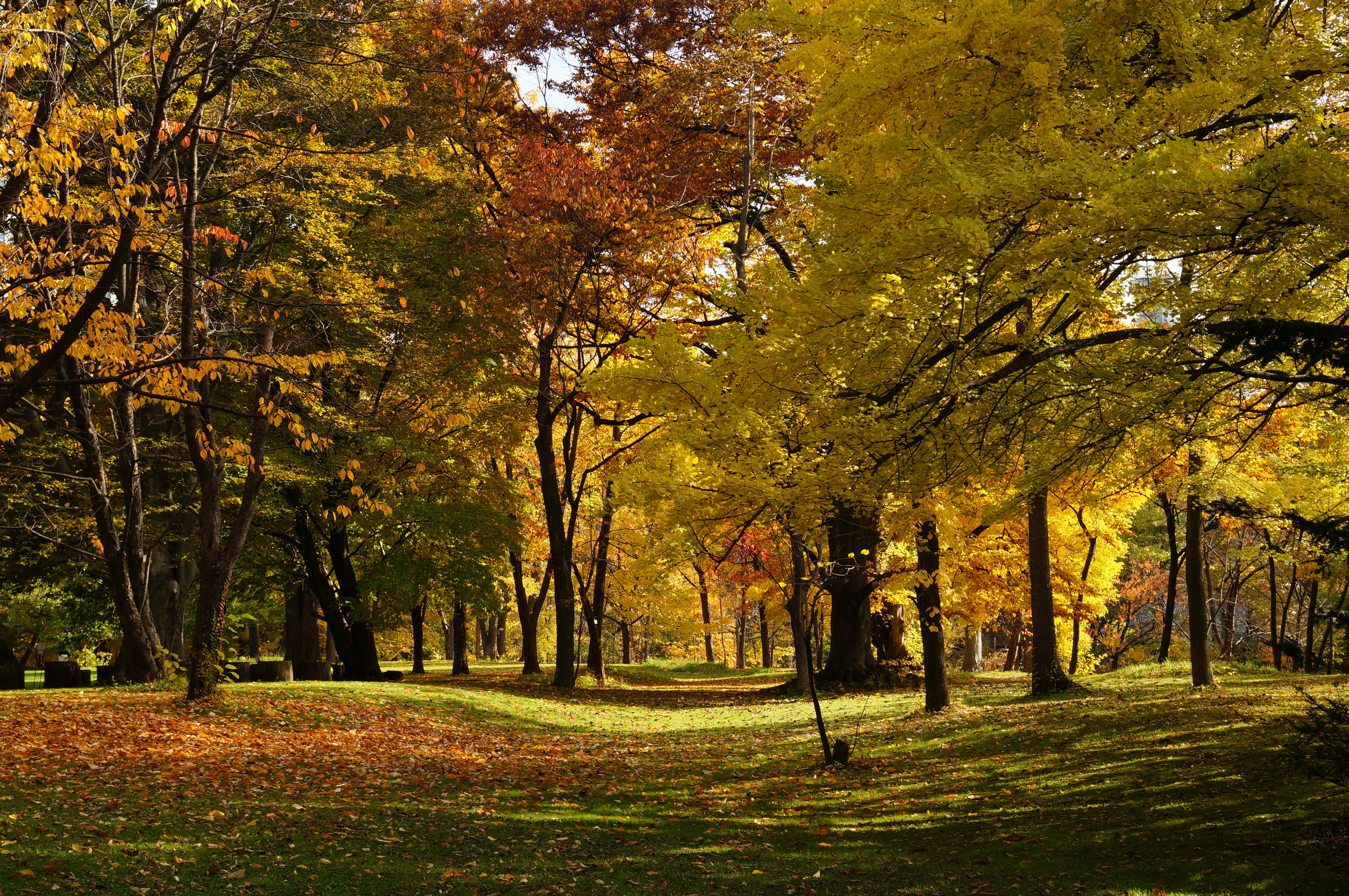
- Hokkaido University Botanic Garden in Sapporo
- Interactive map of Hokkaido University Botanic Garden
- Type: Botanical garden
- Location: North 3, West 8 Chūō-ku, Sapporo, Hokkaido, Japan
- Area: 13.3 hectares (33 acres)
- Opened: 1886; 140 years ago
- Operator: Hokkaido University

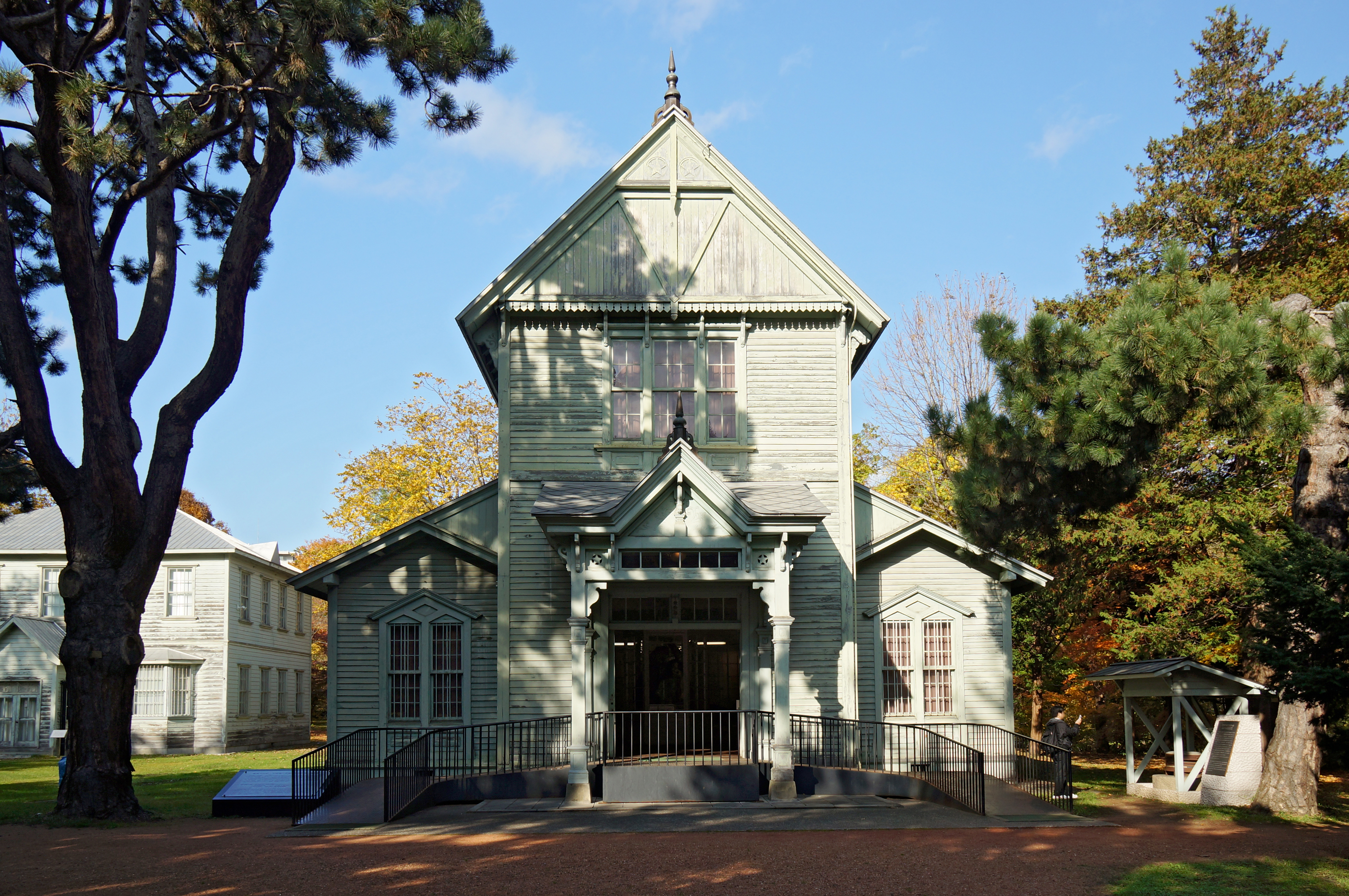
Natural History Museum

The Hokkaido University Botanic Garden (北海道大学植物園, Hokkaidō Daigaku Shokubutsuen; 13.3 hectares) is a botanical garden operated by Hokkaido University. It is located in Chūō-ku, Sapporo, Hokkaidō, Japan, and open daily; an admission fee is charged.

The garden was established in 1886 as part of the former Sapporo Agricultural College, and is now the second oldest botanic garden in Japan (after Koishikawa Botanical Garden). Today it forms part of the university's School of Agriculture, and contains a small part of the forest formerly covering the Ishikari Plain, plus collections of over 4,000 plant species, including alpine plants, wild plants from Hokkaidō, and the oldest lilac in Sapporo. Serious typhoon damage was sustained in 2004.

The garden also contains early Hokkaidō homes, a tropical greenhouse, and the Natural History Museum (built 1884), which exhibits Ainu artefacts, local archaeological and biological specimens, and the stuffed body of Taro, one of two surviving sled dogs from Japan's 1958 Antarctica mission.

== See also ==
- List of botanical gardens in Japan
