= Boston Neighborhood Network =

Coordinates: 42°19′1.1″N 71°5′50.9″W

- Headquarters: Boston, Massachusetts, United States

Ownership
- Owner: Boston Community Access and Programming Foundation, Inc.

History
- Launched: 1983; 43 years ago

Links
- Website: bnnmedia.org

Boston Neighborhood Network (BNN) is a public, educational, and government access (PEG) broadcasting service serving Boston, Massachusetts.

BNN's programming is broadcast on two channels:

- News & Information, Comcast channel 9 and RCN Cable channel 15
- Community Access, Comcast channel 23 and RCN channel 83

BNN members have access to two television studios, digital field production and editing equipment, a multimedia lab, and a mobile production truck, as well as hands-on media training classes. BNN also operates WBCA-LP radio.

== See also ==
- List of television stations in Massachusetts
- List of wired multiple-system broadband providers in Massachusetts (by municipality)
