= Dorchester Temple Baptist Church =

Historic church in Massachusetts, United States

- U.S. National Register of Historic Places
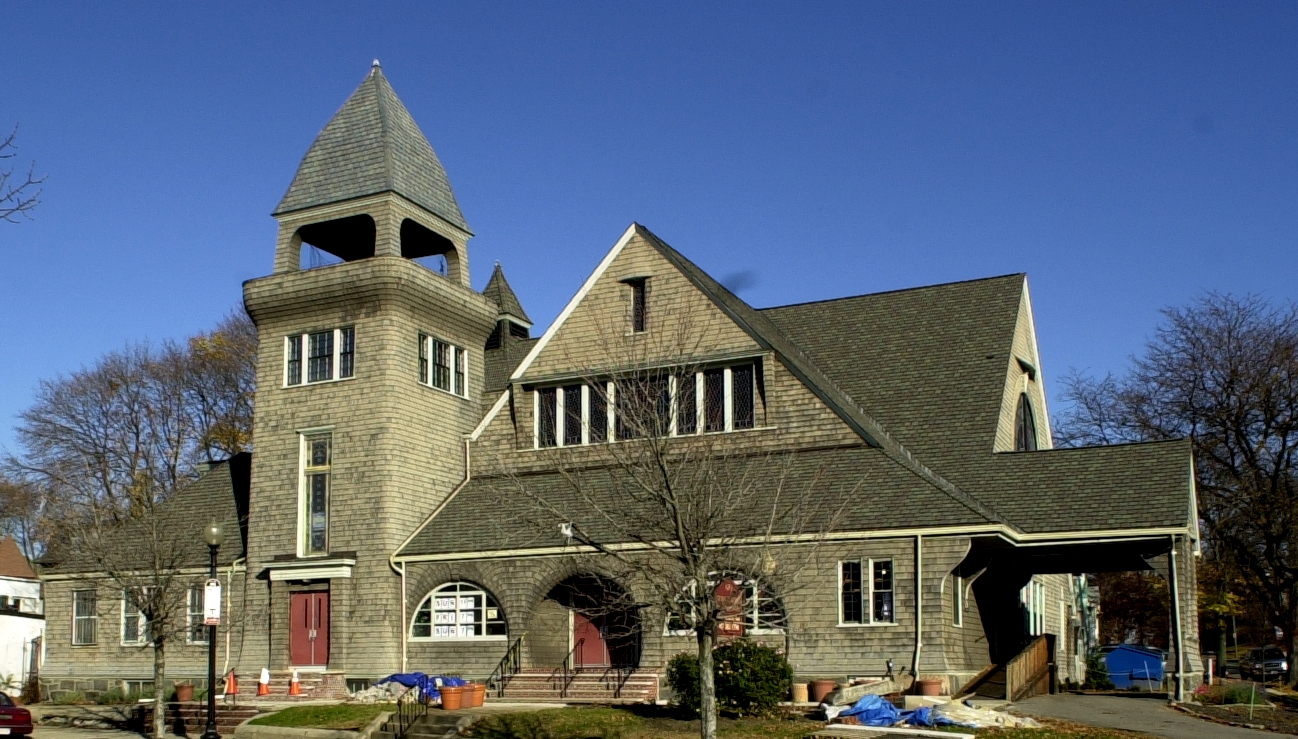

- Location within Massachusetts Location within the United States
- Location: 670 Washington St., Boston, Massachusetts
- Coordinates: 42°17′18.1″N 71°4′15.2″W
- Area: less than one acre
- Built: 1889
- Architect: Arthur H. Vinal
- Architectural style: Late Victorian, Shingle Style
- NRHP reference No.: 97001239
- Added to NRHP: January 16, 1998

Dorchester Temple Baptist Church is a historic African American Baptist church at 670 Washington Street in Boston, Massachusetts. It is now known as Global Ministries Christian Church.

The church was designed in 1889 by Arthur H. Vinal in the shingle style and added to the National Historic Register in 1998. The church was built for a Baptist congregation established in 1886, and is the oldest Baptist church building in Dorchester. It suffered some damage in the 1938 New England hurricane, which was repaired.

In January 2010 the church started media ministry reaching all of North America under the name Boston Praise Radio, which is available online and via Glorystar Satellite service on channel 1010. In 2016, the church began broadcasting on WBPG-LP 102.9 FM.

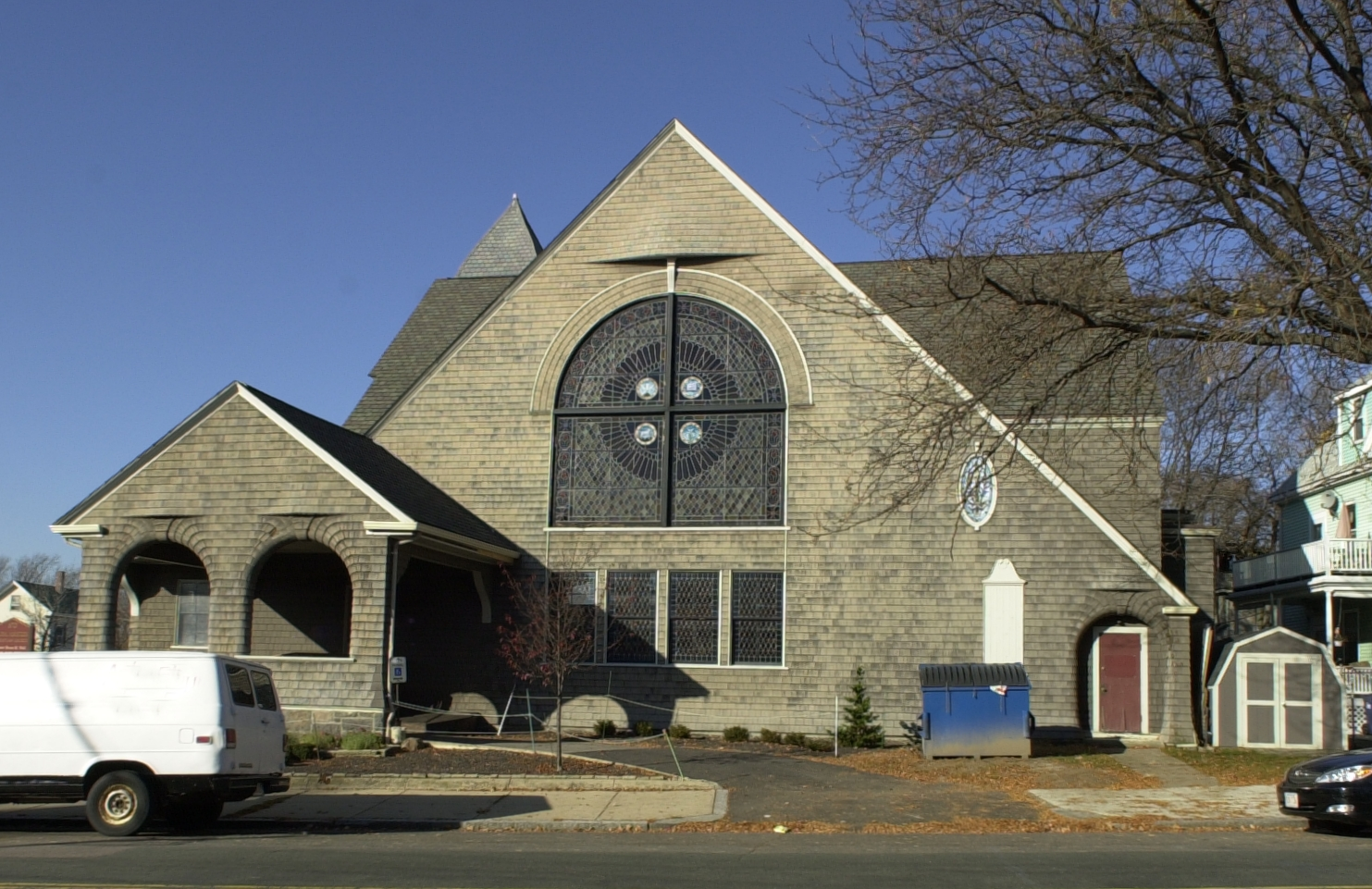

== See also ==
- National Register of Historic Places listings in southern Boston, Massachusetts
