= List of islands of Maine =

Maine is home to over 4,600 coastal islands, ranging from large landmasses like Mount Desert Island to small islets and ledges exposed above mean high tide.

== The Maine Coastal Island Registry (CIR) ==
The Maine Coastal Island Registry (CIR) catalogs 3,166 of these coastal islands, along with some notable inland freshwater islands, such as Frye Island in Sebago Lake. According to the most recent CIR data, 1,846 islands are registered to private owners, while 204 islands, which contain four or more structures, are exempt from registration. Additionally, 1,322 islands are under the care and custody of the State of Maine. The table below uses CIR as its primary source; additional sources are cited.

== Description of table columns ==
The table below provides information on Maine islands, organized by several key columns. Below is an explanation of each column.

Registry #: The unique identifier assigned to each island by the Maine Coastal Island Registry (CIR). Multiple islands may share the same name, but each has a distinct registry number. Islands with multiple landmasses may have several registry numbers under a single name.

Island name/other name(s): The primary name of the island, along with any additional names it may be known by.

Town/county: Identifies the town and county associated with the island. This serves as a reference point, as Maine's islands often have complex jurisdictional histories, including independent towns, parts of mainland municipalities, or self-governing plantations.

Code: Indicates the island's registry status:

- R: Registered
- U: Unregistered
- E: Exempt
- T: Transferred
- L: Leased

Description: Brief information about the island's features, as well as notable owners of these islands. Descriptions and acreage may vary due to changes like construction or natural events.

Area: The size of the island in acres, where available.

== Table ==
| Registry # | Island name | Other name(s) | Town | County | Code | Description | Area |
|---|---|---|---|---|---|---|---|
| 59-259 | Adam's | | Mount Desert | Hancock | R | | |
| 73-029 | Alden | | Topsham | Sagadahoc | E | ME IF&W | |
| 63-840 | Allen | | St. George | Knox | R | Colby College has taken ownership as part of an initiative to preserve it. They will use the island to expand academic programs. | 450 acres (180 ha) |
| 79-540 | Alley | Little Marsh | Beals | Washington | R | | |
| 59-120 | Alley's | | Trenton | Hancock | R | | |
| 59-219 | Alley's Point | | Mount Desert | Hancock | R | | |
| 55-214 | Anderson Rock | | Cumberland | Cumberland | U | | 0.5 acres (0.20 ha) |
| 63-432 | Andrews | | Muscle Ridge Shoals Twp. | Knox | R | Granite ledges surround the entire shoreline. Due to the lack of beaches and suitable landing areas, physical access to the island is challenging. Kayaks and dinghies are the most appropriate vessels for landing, with a few spots on the smooth granite offering access under calm conditions. Owned by the Maine Coast Heritage Trust and is open to the public. | 12.5 acres (5.1 ha) |
| 59-833 | Andrew's | | Stonington | Hancock | R | Private, uninhabited | |
| 63-446 | Andrew's Neck | Neck | Muscle Ridge Shoals Twp. | Knox | R | | |
| 79-574 | Anguilla | | Jonesport | Washington | R | | |
| 79-578 | Anguilla | | Jonesport | Washington | R | | |
| 81-191 | Appledore | | Kittery | York | R | Private, part of Isles of Shoals group, inhabited seasonally with occasional use in the off-season, primarily used by marine biology professors and students at Shoals Marine Laboratory | 99.1 acres (40.1 ha) |
| 63-164 | Arey Ledge | | Vinalhaven | Knox | U | | 0.5 acres (0.20 ha) |
| 63-399 | Arey's | Treasure | Owls Head | Knox | R | | |
| 65-464 | Ark | | Southport | Lincoln | R | | |
| 73-166 | Arrowsic | | Arrowsic | Sagadahoc | E | Private, inhabited year round as a suburb of Bath, approximately 400 residents, connected by bridge to mainland | 6,912 acres (2,797 ha) |
| 59-355 | Asa | Phinney's | Swan's Island | Hancock | R | | |
| 63-404 | Ash | | Owls Head | Knox | R | Can be reached from Birch Point State Park in Owls Head. Acquired by the Maine Coast Heritage Trust. Open to the public. | 47 acres (19 ha) |
| 59-172 | Ash | | Sorrento | Hancock | R | | |
| 65-233 | Aunt Lucys | | South Bristol | Lincoln | R | | |
| 59-581 | Aunt Molly | | Penobscot | Hancock | R | | |
| 63-033 | Aunt Sarah's Ledge | Prescott's Ledge | North Haven | Knox | R | | |
| 79-248 | Avery | | Lubec | Washington | R | | |
| 79-288 | Avery Rock | | Machiasport | Washington | U | Once home to Avery Rock Light, which was demolished after a storm in 1947 | 1.6 acres (0.65 ha) |
| 79-248 | Ayers | | Orono | Penobscot | | | |
| 63-036 | Babbidge | | North Haven | Knox | R | Private, summer retreat since 1906, now uninhabited and largely natural area | |
| 63-039 | Babbidge Ledge | | North Haven | Knox | R | | |
| 63-038 | Babbidge Ledge | | North Haven | Knox | U | | 0.5 acres (0.20 ha) |
| 63-040 | Babbidge Little | | North Haven | Knox | R | | |
| 59-921 | Babson | Big Babson | Brooklin | Hancock | R | Island preserve owned by Maine Coast Heritage Trust. Open to the public. | |
| 59-920 | Babson (Little) | | Brooklin | Hancock | R | Private, used as summer residence | |
| 59-918 | Babson Island Ledge | | Brooklin | Hancock | U | | 0.5 acres (0.20 ha) |
| 59-917 | Babson Island Ledge | | Brooklin | Hancock | U | | 0.5 acres (0.20 ha) |
| 81-214 | Badger's | | Kittery | York | E | Four or more residential structures exist on the island. Inhabited year-round, densely populated suburb of Portsmouth, New Hampshire | |
| 55-428 | Bailey | | Harpswell | Cumberland | E | Connected to mainland by cribstone Bailey Island Bridge, inhabited year-round, private with some public areas | |
| 59-318 | Baker | | Cranberry Isles | Hancock | E | Seasonal, 1/4 private; 3/4 Acadia National Park, spruce forested with rocky coastline. Home to Baker Island Light. | 168 acres (68 ha) |
| 59-473 | Baker | | Swan's Island | Hancock | R | Private, uninhabited | |
| 59-409 | Baker (Little) | | Swan's Island | Hancock | R | | |
| 59-803 | Bald | | Deer Isle | Hancock | R | | |
| 59-193 | Bald Ledge | | State of Maine | Hancock | T | ME IF&W | 0.5 acres (0.20 ha) |
| 59-197 | Bald Porcupine | | Gouldsboro | Hancock | E | Acadia National Park, uninhabited, conifer and hardwood forest | 32 acres (13 ha) |
| 59-036 | Bald Rock | | State of Maine | Hancock | T | ME IF&W | 1.3 acres (0.53 ha) |
| 59-192 | Bald Rock | | State of Maine | Hancock | T | ME IF&W | 0.5 acres (0.20 ha) |
| 79-938 | Baldwin Head | | Milbridge | Washington | R | | |
| 79-488 | Ballast | | Jonesport | Washington | R | | |
| 55-153 | Ballaststone Ledge | | Harpswell | Cumberland | T | ME IF&W | |
| 55-152 | Ballaststone Ledge | | Harpswell | Cumberland | T | ME IF&W | |
| 59-649 | Bancroft Ledge | | Brooksville | Hancock | R | | |
| 55-412 | Bangs | | Chebeague Island | Cumberland | E | exempt — Parks and Recreation | |
| 55-409 | Bangs Island Ledge | | Chebeague Island | Cumberland | T | ME IF&W | 1 acre (0.40 ha) |
| 55-413 | Bangs Island Ledge | | Chebeague Island | Cumberland | T | ME IF&W | 0.5 acres (0.20 ha) |
| 55-414 | Bangs Island Ledge | | Chebeague Island | Cumberland | T | ME IF&W | 0.5 acres (0.20 ha) |
| 59-265 | Bar | | Gouldsboro | Hancock | E | Now uninhabited, conifer, birches, poplar, oak and maple forest, small meadows, part of Acadia National Park since 1945 | 67 acres (27 ha) |
| 79-820 | Bar | | Milbridge | Washington | E | Exempt — 4 or more residential structures | |
| 79-437 | Bar | | Addison | Washington | E | Exempt — 4 or more residential structures | |
| 59-244 | Bar | | Tremont | Hancock | R | | |
| 59-724 | Bar | | Deer Isle | Hancock | R | | |
| 63-802 | Bar | | St. George | Knox | R | | |
| 79-568 | Bar | | Jonesport | Washington | R | | |
| 59-194 | Bar | | Gouldsboro | Hancock | R | | |
| 65-197 | Bar | | Bristol | Lincoln | R | | |
| 63-633 | Bar | | State of Maine | Knox | R | Private, uninhabited | |
| 59-321 | Bar | Crow | Cranberry Isles | Hancock | R | Acadia National Park, closed to protect nesting eagles February 15 to August 31, white pines and hardwoods, depicted in 1850 painting Bar Island and Mt. Desert Mountains from Somes Settlement by Fitz Henry Lane | 67 acres (27 ha) |
| 79-758 | Bar | Raspberry | Harrington | Washington | R | | |
| 79-068 | Bar | | Pembroke | Washington | R | | |
| 65-149 | Bar | | Bremen | Lincoln | R | | |
| 79-487 | Bar | | Jonesport | Washington | R | | |
| 79-291 | Bar | | Machiasport | Washington | R | | |
| 63-146 | Bar | | Vinalhaven | Knox | R | | |
| 59-731 | Bar | | Deer Isle | Hancock | R | | |
| 79-178 | Bar | | Trescott Twp. | Washington | T | Maine Bureau of Parks & Lands | 1 acre (0.40 ha) |
| 55-403 | Bar | | Harpswell | Cumberland | U | | 0.5 acres (0.20 ha) |
| 59-717 | Bar | Clam, Sam Crockett's | Deer Isle | Hancock | R | | |
| 59-040 | Bar (Inner) | | Gouldsboro | Hancock | R | | |
| 79-477 | Bar (Little) | | Jonesport | Washington | R | | |
| 59-041 | Bar (Outer) | | Gouldsboro | Hancock | R | | |
| 79-476 | Bar (Southwest) | | Jonesport | Washington | R | | |
| 63-643 | Bar Island Ledge | | Muscle Ridge Shoals Twp. | Knox | U | | 0.5 acres (0.20 ha) |
| 65-134 | Barbican | | Bristol | Lincoln | R | | |
| 59-905 | Bare | | Stonington | Hancock | R | Private, summer cottages | |
| 59-904 | Bare Island Ledge | | Stonington | Hancock | U | | 0.5 acres (0.20 ha) |
| 73-212 | Bare Tidal | | Georgetown | Sagadahoc | R | | |
| 73-128 | Bareneck | | Georgetown | Sagadahoc | R | | |
| 73-129 | Bareneck (Little) | | Georgetown | Sagadahoc | R | | |
| 59-342 | Barge (East) | | Tremont | Hancock | R | | |
| 59-343 | Barge (West) | | Tremont | Hancock | R | | |
| 55-290 | Barnes | | Harpswell | Cumberland | R | | |
| 55-402 | Barnes | | Harpswell | Cumberland | R | | |
| 55-291 | Barnes | | Harpswell | Cumberland | R | | |
| 59-683 | Barred | | Deer Isle | Hancock | E | exempt — IF&W 1970 | |
| 59-825 | Barred | | Deer Isle | Hancock | R | | 5 acres (2.0 ha) |
| 59-780 | Barred | Chain Links | State of Maine | Hancock | R | | |
| 59-684 | Barred (East) | | Deer Isle | Hancock | E | exempt — IF&W 1970 | |
| 59-778 | Barred (Little) | Shelter | Deer Isle | Hancock | R | | |
| 63-758 | Barrels (Part Of) | | Friendship | Knox | R | | |
| 63-759 | Barrels Brig | | Friendship | Knox | R | | |
| 59-775 | Bartender | | Deer Isle | Hancock | R | | |
| 65-359 | Barter's | | Boothbay | Lincoln | E | Exempt — 4 or more residential structures | |
| 63-807 | Barter's | | St. George | Knox | R | | |
| 59-240 | Bartlett | | Mount Desert | Hancock | R | | |
| 55-249 | Bartol | | Freeport | Cumberland | R | | |
| 63-109 | Barton | | Vinalhaven | Knox | E | Private, inhabited year-round with some summer cottages, connected by bridge to Vinalhaven | |
| 81-012 | Basket | | Biddeford | York | E | Exempt — 4 or more residential structures | |
| 55-321 | Basket | | Cumberland | Cumberland | R | | |
| 81-095 | Bass | | Kennebunkport | York | R | | |
| 55-447 | Bates | | Chebeague Island | Cumberland | R | | |
| 55-440 | Bates | | Chebeague Island | Cumberland | R | | |
| 55-448 | Bates | | Chebeague Island | Cumberland | R | | |
| 55-446 | Bates | | Chebeague Island | Cumberland | R | | |
| 55-444 | Bates | | Chebeague Island | Cumberland | R | | |
| 55-443 | Bates | | Chebeague Island | Cumberland | R | | |
| 79-613 | Batson Ledges | | Addison | Washington | T | ME IF&W | 1 acre (0.40 ha) |
| 63-286 | Battery | | Isle au Haut | Knox | U | | 0.5 acres (0.20 ha) |
| 59-584 | Battle | | Penobscot | Hancock | R | Owned by the Maine Coast Heritage Trust. Open to the public. | 2 acres (0.81 ha) |
| 59-671 | Bayberry Ledge | | Brooksville | Hancock | R | | |
| 59-687 | Beach | | State of Maine | Hancock | R | | |
| 81-018 | Beach | | Biddeford | York | T | ME IF&W | 1 acre (0.40 ha) |
| 73-130 | Beal | | Georgetown | Sagadahoc | R | | |
| 79-524 | Beals | | Beals | Washington | E | exempt — 4 or more residential structures | |
| 59-190 | Bean | | Sorrento | Hancock | R | | |
| 59-791 | Bear | | State of Maine | Hancock | E | Private, summer cottages, summer rusticator R. Buckminster Fuller left a geodesic dome still visible. | |
| 79-289 | Bear | | Machiasport | Washington | R | | |
| 59-266 | Bear | | Cranberry Isles | Hancock | R | Acadia National Park, closed to visitors February 15-August 15 to avoid disturbing eagle nesting. Home to Bear Island Light, which can be seen from the village of Manset. | |
| 73-140 | Bear | | Phippsburg | Sagadahoc | R | | |
| 59-925 | Bear (Big) | | Deer Isle | Hancock | R | Private, vegetation recovering after 1980s pulp operation | |
| 59-924 | Bear (Little) | | Deer Isle | Hancock | R | | |
| 73-142 | Bear Island Ledge | | Phippsburg | Sagadahoc | U | | 0.5 acres (0.20 ha) |
| 65-223 | Beaver | | Bristol | Lincoln | R | | |
| 63-059 | Beckman's | | Vinalhaven | Knox | R | | |
| 79-431 | Benjy's | | Addison | Washington | R | | |
| 63-825 | Benner | | St. George | Knox | R | Summer cottages; the harbor is an "extraordinary haven" even though well out to sea. | |
| 55-048 | Duffy's | Merritt's, Ben | Harpswell | Cumberland | R | Renamed Duffy's Island by current owners as of 2020. | |
| 65-030 | Ben's | | Waldoboro | Lincoln | R | | |
| 77-077 | Bermuda (Little) | | Islesboro | Waldo | R | | |
| 73-126 | Berry | | Georgetown | Sagadahoc | R | | |
| 65-341 | Berry | | Wiscasset | Lincoln | R | | |
| 65-125 | Betsy's | | South Bristol | Lincoln | R | | |
| 63-772 | Beyership Ledge | Byship | Friendship | Knox | R | | |
| 81-062 | Bibb Rock | | Wells | York | U | | 0.5 acres (0.20 ha) |
| 81-106 | Bickford | | Kennebunkport | York | E | Exempt — 4 or more residential structures | |
| 59-558 | Big | Moores, Roger's | Brooksville | Hancock | R | | |
| 59-555 | Big | Roger's | Brooksville | Hancock | R | | |
| 59-046 | Big Black Ledge (Big) | | Gouldsboro | Hancock | U | | 0.5 acres (0.20 ha) |
| 63-508 | Big Garden (South) | | Vinalhaven | Knox | U | | 4 acres (1.6 ha) |
| 59-639 | Big Rock | | Blue Hill | Hancock | R | | |
| 73-076 | Biljim | | Woolwich | Sagadahoc | R | | |
| 63-208 | Bill's | | Isle au Haut | Knox | R | Private | 10 acres (4.0 ha) |
| 55-103 | Birch | | Harpswell | Cumberland | E | 4 or more residential structures | |
| 79-170 | Birch | | Edmunds Twp. | Washington | E | Exempt - Dept. of Interior | |
| 79-172 | Birch | | Edmunds Twp. | Washington | E | Exempt - Dept. of Interior | |
| 59-235 | Birch | | Tremont | Hancock | R | | |
| 63-428 | Birch | | State of Maine | Knox | R | Private, summer cottages | |
| 59-228 | Birch | | Mount Desert | Hancock | R | | |
| 79-430 | Birch | | Addison | Washington | R | | |
| 65-241 | Birch | | South Bristol | Lincoln | R | | |
| 59-703 | Birch | | Deer Isle | Hancock | R | | |
| 63-043 | Birch | | Vinalhaven | Knox | R | | |
| 63-105 | Birch | | Vinalhaven | Knox | R | | |
| 73-244 | Birch | Poor's | Georgetown | Sagadahoc | R | | |
| 55-102 | Birch (Little) | | Harpswell | Cumberland | R | | |
| 55-406 | Birch (Little) | | Harpswell | Cumberland | R | | 9.2 acres (3.7 ha) |
| 79-743 | Birch (Lower) | | Addison | Washington | R | Two islands connected at low tide, post-and-beam house on the larger of the two, access from adjacent mainland parcel | 24 acres (9.7 ha) |
| 79-742 | Birch (Lower) | | Addison | Washington | R | Smaller island adjacent to Birch Island # 79-743 above | |
| 79-740 | Birch (Upper) | | Addison | Washington | R | Larger of two islands linked by bar at low tide | |
| 63-044 | Birch Island Ledge | | Vinalhaven | Knox | U | | 0.5 acres (0.20 ha) |
| 63-429 | Birch Ledge | | State of Maine | Knox | R | | |
| 77-052 | Birch Point | | Islesboro | Waldo | R | | |
| 73-055 | Bird | | Bowdoinham | Sagadahoc | U | | 0.5 acres (0.20 ha) |
| 59-138 | Bird Rock | | Blue Hill | Hancock | T | ME IF&W | 0.5 acres (0.20 ha) |
| 63-752 | Birthday | | Cushing | Knox | R | | |
| 59-132 | Black | | Bar Harbor | Hancock | R | | |
| 79-658 | Black | | Jonesport | Washington | R | | |
| 63-700 | Black | | Friendship | Knox | R | Campsites, walking trails. The island is undeveloped now, but originally belonged to a lobsterman and his wife. There is a "Lilac Campsite" on the western shore, where they once had a homestead. Owned by Maine Coast Heritage Trust. Open to the public. | |
| 59-437 | Black | | Frenchboro | Hancock | R | | |
| 59-352 | Black | | Swan's Island | Hancock | R | Private, under "forever wild" conservation easement | |
| 59-443 | Black (Little) | | Frenchboro | Hancock | R | | |
| 79-449 | Black Duck | | Beals | Washington | R | | |
| 63-294 | Black Horse | | Isle au Haut | Knox | T | ME IF&W | 2.5 acres (1.0 ha) |
| 63-769 | Black Island Ledge | | Friendship | Knox | U | | 0.5 acres (0.20 ha) |
| 59-482 | Black Ledge | | Swan's Island | Hancock | T | ME IF&W | 2 acres (0.81 ha) |
| 63-913 | Black Ledge (Eastern) | | Matinicus Isle Plt. | Knox | U | | 1 acre (0.40 ha) |
| 63-911 | Black Ledge (West) | | Matinicus Isle Plt. | Knox | U | | 1 acre (0.40 ha) |
| 79-311 | Black Ledges | | Cutler | Washington | U | | 1 acre (0.40 ha) |
| 79-195 | Black Point | | Edmunds Twp. | Washington | R | | |
| 55-252 | Black Rock | | Harpswell | Cumberland | T | ME IF&W | 0.5 acres (0.20 ha) |
| 73-268 | Black Rock | | Georgetown | Sagadahoc | U | | 0.5 acres (0.20 ha) |
| 73-265 | Black Rock | | Georgetown | Sagadahoc | U | | 0.5 acres (0.20 ha) |
| 73-267 | Black Rock | | Georgetown | Sagadahoc | U | | 0.5 acres (0.20 ha) |
| 73-266 | Black Rock | | Georgetown | Sagadahoc | U | | 0.5 acres (0.20 ha) |
| 63-937 | Black Rocks | | Matinicus Isle Plt. | Knox | U | | 0.5 acres (0.20 ha) |
| 63-837 | Black Rocks | | St. George | Knox | U | | 0.5 acres (0.20 ha) |
| 79-760 | Blackberry | Hen, Blueberry | Harrington | Washington | R | | |
| 55-028 | Blackies Ledge | | Brunswick | Cumberland | R | | |
| 63-826 | Blubber | | St. George | Knox | R | | |
| 59-125 | Blueberry | | Bar Harbor | Hancock | R | | |
| 81-001 | Bluff | | Saco | York | R | | |
| 63-079 | Bluffhead | | Vinalhaven | Knox | R | Marks entrance to Seal Bay, an excellent anchorage | |
| 79-380 | Board Point | | Roque Bluffs | Washington | R | | |
| 63-806 | Bob's | Tom's | St. George | Knox | R | | |
| 61-004 | Bodge Sands | Sands | Pittston | Kennebec | R | | |
| 65-367 | Boiler | | Westport Island | Lincoln | R | | |
| 79-824 | Bois Bubert | | Milbridge | Washington | E | Exempt — 4 or more residential structures | |
| 79-926 | Bois Bubert (Little) | | Milbridge | Washington | R | | |
| 59-960 | Bold | | Stonington | Hancock | R | | |
| 73-230 | Bolton | | Georgetown | Sagadahoc | R | | |
| 55-040 | Bombazine | | Harpswell | Cumberland | R | | |
| 79-841 | Bonny Chess Ledge | | Steuben | Washington | U | | 1 acre (0.40 ha) |
| 61-007 | Boom (No. 1) | | Chelsea | Kennebec | R | | |
| 61-008 | Boom (No. 2) | | Chelsea | Kennebec | R | | |
| 81-200 | Boon | | York | York | E | Owned by the Department of the Interior. Home to Boon Island Light. | |
| 81-201 | Boon Island Ledge | | Kittery | York | U | | 0.5 acres (0.20 ha) |
| 65-419 | Boston | | Southport | Lincoln | E | Exempt — 4 or more residential structures | |
| 79-469 | Boundary Ledges | | Jonesport | Washington | U | | 0 acres (0 ha) |
| 79-470 | Boundary Ledges | | Jonesport | Washington | U | | 0 acres (0 ha) |
| 79-757 | Bowline Head | | Harrington | Washington | R | | |
| 73-221 | Bowman's | | Georgetown | Sagadahoc | R | | |
| 55-247 | Bowman's | | Freeport | Cumberland | R | | |
| 59-771 | Bradbury | | Deer Isle | Hancock | R | Private, owned by The Nature Conservancy | |
| 81-124 | Bragdon | Pine | York | York | R | | |
| 81-129 | Bragdon | Pine | York | York | R | | |
| 55-041 | Bragdon | | Harpswell | Cumberland | R | Private | 7 acres (2.8 ha) |
| 55-128 | Branch (The) | Little North Yarmouth | Harpswell | Cumberland | E | Exempt - 4 or more structures | |
| 55-134 | Branch (The) | Little North Yarmouth | Harpswell | Cumberland | R | | |
| 55-265 | Brant Ledge | | Harpswell | Cumberland | U | | 0.5 acres (0.20 ha) |
| 81-003 | Breaker's Ledge | | Saco | York | U | | 0.5 acres (0.20 ha) |
| 81-004 | Breaker's Ledge | | Saco | York | U | | 0.5 acres (0.20 ha) |
| 65-038 | Bremen | Bremen Long | Bremen | Lincoln | E | Exempt — 4 or more residential structures | |
| 63-242 | Brewster (Big) | | Isle au Haut | Knox | U | | 0.5 acres (0.20 ha) |
| 73-051 | Brick | | Bowdoinham | Sagadahoc | R | | |
| 73-053 | Brick | | Bowdoinham | Sagadahoc | T | ME IF&W | 0.5 acres (0.20 ha) |
| 63-934 | Brig Ledge | | Criehaven Twp. | Knox | T | ME IF&W | 1 acre (0.40 ha) |
| 63-182 | Brimstone | Holden Ledge | Vinalhaven | Knox | R | Private, name comes from sulphurous black rock abounding on island | |
| 63-172 | Brimstone | | Vinalhaven | Knox | R | | |
| 63-181 | Brimstone | | Vinalhaven | Knox | R | | |
| 63-173 | Brimstone | | Vinalhaven | Knox | R | | |
| 63-177 | Brimstone | | Vinalhaven | Knox | R | | |
| 63-180 | Brimstone | | Vinalhaven | Knox | R | | |
| 63-178 | Brimstone | | Vinalhaven | Knox | R | | |
| 63-176 | Brimstone | | Vinalhaven | Knox | R | | |
| 59-479 | Brimstone | | Swan's Island | Hancock | T | ME IF&W | 1.5 acres (0.61 ha) |
| 63-179 | Brimstone (Little) | | Vinalhaven | Knox | R | | |
| 55-454 | Broken Cove | | Chebeague Island | Cumberland | T | ME IF&W | 0.5 acres (0.20 ha) |
| 55-455 | Broken Cove | | Chebeague Island | Cumberland | T | ME IF&W | 0.5 acres (0.20 ha) |
| 55-453 | Broken Cove | | Chebeague Island | Cumberland | T | ME IF&W | 0.5 acres (0.20 ha) |
| 65-411 | Brooks | | Westport Island | Lincoln | U | | 0.5 acres (0.20 ha) |
| 79-586 | Brothers (Eastern) | | Jonesport | Washington | R | | |
| 63-581 | Brothers (Part Of) | | St. George | Knox | R | | |
| 63-580 | Brothers (Part Of) | | St. George | Knox | R | | |
| 63-579 | Brothers (Part Of) | | St. George | Knox | R | | |
| 55-347 | Brothers I (The) | | Falmouth | Cumberland | R | | |
| 55-348 | Brothers II (The) | | Falmouth | Cumberland | R | | |
| 55-349 | Brothers III (The) | | Falmouth | Cumberland | R | | |
| 55-632 | Brown Cow (East) | | Harpswell | Cumberland | T | ME IF&W | 2.4 acres (0.97 ha) |
| 55-458 | Brown Cow (West) | | Chebeague Island | Cumberland | E | Exempt - IF&W | 1.3 acres (0.53 ha) |
| 55-457 | Brown Cow (West) | | Chebeague Island | Cumberland | T | ME IF&W | 0.5 acres (0.20 ha) |
| 55-456 | Brown Cow (West) | | Chebeague Island | Cumberland | T | ME IF&W | 0.5 acres (0.20 ha) |
| 55-459 | Brown Cow (West) | | Chebeague Island | Cumberland | T | ME IF&W | 0.5 acres (0.20 ha) |
| 79-693 | Browney | Brownies | Beals | Washington | R | | |
| 63-553 | Browns | | St. George | Knox | R | | |
| 63-552 | Browns | | St. George | Knox | R | | |
| 73-095 | Brown's | | West Bath | Sagadahoc | R | | |
| 63-112 | Brown's | | Vinalhaven | Knox | R | Private, largely barren island | |
| 61-001 | Brown's | | Farmingdale | Kennebec | R | | |
| 79-427 | Bryants | | Addison | Washington | R | | |
| 59-672 | Buck | | Brooksville | Hancock | E | Exempt - IF&W 1969 | |
| 59-970 | Buckle | | Stonington | Hancock | R | | |
| 59-375 | Buckle | Duck | Swan's Island | Hancock | R | Private, uninhabited | |
| 81-061 | Bucklin Rock | | Wells | York | U | | 0.5 acres (0.20 ha) |
| 79-292 | Buck's Head | | Machiasport | Washington | U | | 0.5 acres (0.20 ha) |
| 55-621 | Bull Ledge (Little) | | Harpswell | Cumberland | T | ME IF&W | 1 acre (0.40 ha) |
| 63-031 | Bull Rock | | North Haven | Knox | R | | |
| 81-102 | Bumpkin | | Kennebunkport | York | R | | |
| 55-230 | Bunganuc | | Brunswick | Cumberland | U | | 0.5 acres (0.20 ha) |
| 79-445 | Bungy Rock | | Addison | Washington | U | | 0.5 acres (0.20 ha) |
| 59-308 | Bunker Ledge | | Cranberry Isles | Hancock | T | ME IF&W | 0.5 acres (0.20 ha) |
| 59-310 | Bunker Ledge (Eastern) | | Cranberry Isles | Hancock | T | ME IF&W | 0.5 acres (0.20 ha) |
| 79-118 | Burial | Bush | Eastport | Washington | U | | 1 acre (0.40 ha) |
| 65-437 | Burnt | | Southport | Lincoln | E | Exempt - Dept. of Interior; home to Burnt Island Light | |
| 63-271 | Burnt | | Isle au Haut | Knox | R | Private, summer home of Holmes family descendants | |
| 63-094 | Burnt | Little Burnt | Vinalhaven | Knox | R | | |
| 63-095 | Burnt | Big Burnt | Vinalhaven | Knox | R | Uninhabited, given to the town of North Haven in 1993, used by picnicking families | |
| 63-013 | Burnt | | North Haven | Knox | R | | |
| 63-024 | Burnt | | North Haven | Knox | R | | |
| 63-097 | Burnt | | Vinalhaven | Knox | R | | |
| 63-098 | Burnt | | Vinalhaven | Knox | R | | |
| 63-880 | Burnt | | St. George | Knox | R | | |
| 63-625 | Burnt | | South Thomaston | Knox | R | Private, linked to Sprucehead by private bridge | |
| 79-093 | Burnt | | Pembroke | Washington | R | | |
| 63-841 | Burnt (Little) | | St. George | Knox | R | | |
| 73-207 | Burnt Coat | | Phippsburg | Sagadahoc | R | | |
| 79-188 | Burnt Cove | | Edmunds Twp. | Washington | R | | |
| 79-084 | Burnt Island Ledge | | Pembroke | Washington | R | | 0.5 acres (0.20 ha) |
| 63-027 | Burnt Island Ledge | | North Haven | Knox | T | ME IF&W | 1 acre (0.40 ha) |
| 63-028 | Burnt Island Ledge | | North Haven | Knox | T | ME IF&W | 0.5 acres (0.20 ha) |
| 65-436 | Burnt Island Ledge | | Southport | Lincoln | U | | 0.5 acres (0.20 ha) |
| 63-270 | Burnt Island Ledge | | Isle au Haut | Knox | U | | 0.5 acres (0.20 ha) |
| 59-198 | Burnt Porcupine | | Gouldsboro | Hancock | R | | |
| 63-783 | Burtons | | Cushing | Knox | R | | |
| 63-111 | Burying | | Vinalhaven | Knox | R | | |
| 59-084 | Burying | | Franklin | Hancock | R | | 37.8 acres (15.3 ha) |
| 79-424 | Bush | | Addison | Washington | R | | |
| 55-124 | Bush | Pine | Harpswell | Cumberland | R | | |
| 81-099 | Bush Savin | | Kennebunkport | York | R | | |
| 73-177 | Bushy | | Phippsburg | Sagadahoc | U | | 0.5 acres (0.20 ha) |
| 55-250 | Bustine | | Freeport | Cumberland | U | | 0.5 acres (0.20 ha) |
| 55-253 | Bustins | | Freeport | Cumberland | E | Seasonal, approximately 115 summer cottages served by a May–September ferry, self-governing "village corporation" | 134 acres (54 ha) |
| 55-257 | Bustins (Little) | | Freeport | Cumberland | R | | |
| 59-081 | Butler's | | Franklin | Hancock | R | | |
| 59-776 | Butter | Dirigio | State of Maine | Hancock | R | Private, once densely populated but now uninhabited, part of Maine Island Trail | |
| 65-033 | Butter Point | | Waldoboro | Lincoln | R | | |
| 65-249 | Cabbage | | Boothbay | Lincoln | E | Exempt — 4 or more residential structures | |
| 65-250 | Cabbage Island Ledge | | Boothbay | Lincoln | U | | 0.5 acres (0.20 ha) |
| 63-032 | Calderwood | | North Haven | Knox | R | The island has sand and gravel beaches, ledges, and cliffs. The island is half spruce forest and half meadow. The island was previously used by the Calderwood family to feed their sheep. Owned by Maine Coast Heritage Trust. Open to the public. | 75 acres (30 ha) |
| 63-791 | Caldwell | | St. George | Knox | R | | |
| 63-794 | Caldwell (East Most Lt) | | St. George | Knox | R | | |
| 63-793 | Caldwell (Little) | | St. George | Knox | R | | |
| 63-542 | Calf | | St. George | Knox | R | Private, summer rusticator's cottage | |
| 59-177 | Calf | | Sorrento | Hancock | R | | |
| 79-664 | Calf | | Jonesport | Washington | R | | |
| 79-564 | Calf | | Roque Bluffs | Washington | U | | 0.5 acres (0.20 ha) |
| 59-178 | Calf (Little) | | Sorrento | Hancock | R | | |
| 79-592 | Calf Island Ledge | | Roque Bluffs | Washington | U | | 0.5 acres (0.20 ha) |
| 63-484 | Calm | | Vinalhaven | Knox | R | | |
| 59-886 | Camp | | Stonington | Hancock | R | | |
| 63-426 | Camp | | State of Maine | Knox | R | | |
| 79-573 | Camp (Eastern) | | Jonesport | Washington | E | United States of America | |
| 59-887 | Camp (Little) | | Stonington | Hancock | R | | |
| 63-381 | Camp (Southern) | | Muscle Ridge Shoals Twp. | Knox | R | | |
| 63-445 | Camp (West) | Camp | Muscle Ridge Shoals Twp. | Knox | R | | |
| 79-587 | Camp (Western) | Western Brothers | Jonesport | Washington | R | | |
| 63-928 | Camp Cove | | Criehaven Twp. | Knox | U | | 2 acres (0.81 ha) |
| 63-431 | Camp Ledge (East) | | Muscle Ridge Shoals Twp. | Knox | R | | |
| 79-585 | Camp Ledge (Eastern) | Brothers Ledge | Jonesport | Washington | R | | |
| 63-425 | Camp Ledge (North) | | Muscle Ridge Shoals Twp. | Knox | R | | |
| 59-923 | Campbell | | Deer Isle | Hancock | R | Private, donated to Island Institute in the 1980s, used by Maine Island Trail | |
| 73-337 | Campbell's | | Phippsburg | Sagadahoc | R | | |
| 81-093 | Cape | Cape Porpoise | Kennebunkport | York | R | | |
| 79-720 | Cape Point (Little) | Great Wass | Beals | Washington | R | | |
| 79-297 | Cape Wash | | Cutler | Washington | R | | |
| 79-270 | Cape Washington | | Cutler | Washington | U | | 0.5 acres (0.20 ha) |
| 65-441 | Capital | | Southport | Lincoln | E | Exempt — 4 or more residential structures | |
| 65-270 | Card Ledges | | Boothbay | Lincoln | U | | 0.5 acres (0.20 ha) |
| 65-111 | Carlisle | | Boothbay | Lincoln | R | | |
| 79-106 | Carlow's | | Eastport | Washington | R | | |
| 59-741 | Carlton's | | Blue Hill | Hancock | R | | |
| 59-726 | Carney | | Deer Isle | Hancock | R | Private, summer cottage | |
| 79-746 | Carrying Place | | Harrington | Washington | R | | |
| 79-436 | Carrying Place | | Addison | Washington | R | | |
| 79-775 | Carrying Place (West) | | Harrington | Washington | T | ME IF&W | 0.5 acres (0.20 ha) |
| 73-287 | Carrying Place Head | | Phippsburg | Sagadahoc | R | | |
| 63-166 | Carvers | | Vinalhaven | Knox | E | Uninhabited, Maine Parks and Recreation | |
| 63-186 | Carvers Island Ledge | | Vinalhaven | Knox | T | ME IF&W | 0.5 acres (0.20 ha) |
| 73-125 | Castle | | Georgetown | Sagadahoc | R | | |
| 79-152 | Cat | | Pembroke | Washington | U | | 3 acres (1.2 ha) |
| 65-453 | Cat Ledges | | Southport | Lincoln | U | | 4 acres (1.6 ha) |
| 65-119 | Catania's | Common | Bristol | Lincoln | R | | |
| 63-921 | Cato Ledge | | Matinicus Isle Plt. | Knox | U | | 0.5 acres (0.20 ha) |
| 63-532 | Cat-Sized | | Vinalhaven | Knox | R | | |
| 63-069 | Cave | Collins | Vinalhaven | Knox | R | | |
| 81-194 | Cedar | | Kittery | York | E | 4 or more residential structures exist on the island. | |
| 63-761 | Cedar | | Friendship | Knox | R | | |
| 55-600 | Cedar | | Harpswell | Cumberland | R | | |
| 59-666 | Cedar | | Brooksville | Hancock | R | | |
| 55-075 | Cedar Ledge | | Harpswell | Cumberland | R | | |
| 55-608 | Cedar Ledge | | Harpswell | Cumberland | T | ME IF&W | 0.5 acres (0.20 ha) |
| 55-179 | Cedar Ledge | | Harpswell | Cumberland | T | ME IF&W | 2.4 acres (0.97 ha) |
| 55-073 | Cedar Ledges | | Harpswell | Cumberland | U | | 0.5 acres (0.20 ha) |
| 65-445 | Cedarbush | | Southport | Lincoln | U | | 0.5 acres (0.20 ha) |
| 55-055 | Center | Little | Harpswell | Cumberland | R | | |
| 63-023 | Ch&J | | North Haven | Knox | R | | |
| 59-781 | Chain Link (First) | | Deer Isle | Hancock | R | | |
| 59-783 | Chain Link (Last) | | Deer Isle | Hancock | R | | |
| 79-773 | Chamberly | | Milbridge | Washington | U | | 0.5 acres (0.20 ha) |
| 79-277 | Chance | Chances | Machiasport | Washington | R | | |
| 79-435 | Chandler | | Addison | Washington | R | Private, seasonal camp | 1 acre (0.40 ha) |
| 63-168 | Channel | | Vinalhaven | Knox | U | | 1 acre (0.40 ha) |
| 59-792 | Channel Rock | | Deer Isle | Hancock | T | ME IF&W | 0.5 acres (0.20 ha) |
| 59-345 | Channel Rock | | Brooklin | Hancock | U | | 0.5 acres (0.20 ha) |
| 59-858 | Channel Rock | | Stonington | Hancock | U | | 0.5 acres (0.20 ha) |
| 59-754 | Chatto | | Brooklin | Hancock | R | Private, under conservation easements, forms "one of the most protected anchorages in Eggemoggin Reach." | |
| 55-294 | Chebeague (Great) | | Chebeague Island | Cumberland | E | Inhabited year-round, mostly private | |
| 55-324 | Chebeague (Little) | | Chebeague Island | Cumberland | E | Exempt — Parks and Recreation | |
| 65-244 | Christmas Cove | | South Bristol | Lincoln | T | ME IF&W | 0.5 acres (0.20 ha) |
| 63-668 | Church Ledge | | Cushing | Knox | R | | |
| 63-073 | Clam | | Vinalhaven | Knox | R | | |
| 65-150 | Clam | | Bremen | Lincoln | R | | |
| 59-957 | Clam | | Stonington | Hancock | U | | 0.5 acres (0.20 ha) |
| 59-958 | Clam | | Stonington | Hancock | U | | |
| 63-133 | Clam Ledge | | Vinalhaven | Knox | U | | 0.5 acres (0.20 ha) |
| 63-638 | Clam Ledge | Seal | St. George | Knox | T | ME IF&W | 0.6 acres (0.24 ha) |
| 63-437 | Clam Ledge | | Muscle Ridge Shoals Twp. | Knox | R | | |
| 63-438 | Clam Ledge | | South Thomaston | Knox | R | | |
| 63-439 | Clam Ledge | | South Thomaston | Knox | R | | |
| 55-327 | Clapboard (East) | | Falmouth | Cumberland | E | Features maritime spruce-fir and pine-oak forests, four gravel beaches, and trails. The island is known for its birdlife, including ospreys and bald eagles. Owned by Maine Coast Heritage Trust and is open to the public. | 15 acres (6.1 ha) |
| 55-326 | Clapboard (North) | | Falmouth | Cumberland | U | | 0.5 acres (0.20 ha) |
| 55-328 | Clapboard Island Ledge | | Falmouth | Cumberland | T | ME IF&W | 0.5 acres (0.20 ha) |
| 63-561 | Clark | | St. George | Knox | R | Accessible by bridge. Previously Wabanaki territory. Used to be home to hundreds of stone cutters. Currently, the island has two residences left, with old foundations visible. | 124 acres (50 ha) |
| 63-559 | Clark (Part Of) | | St. George | Knox | R | | |
| 63-560 | Clark (Part Of) | | St. George | Knox | R | | |
| 63-562 | Clark (Part Of) | | St. George | Knox | R | | |
| 63-563 | Clark (Part Of) | | St. George | Knox | R | | |
| 63-564 | Clark (Part Of) | | St. George | Knox | R | | |
| 81-163 | Clarks | | Kittery | York | E | Exempt - public ownership | |
| 55-460 | Cliff | | Portland | Cumberland | E | Exempt-4 or more structures; year-round population of approximately 60 | |
| 55-501 | Cliff Island Ledge | | Portland | Cumberland | U | | 0.5 acres (0.20 ha) |
| 59-141 | Closson | | Blue Hill | Hancock | R | | |
| 65-410 | Clous Ledge | | Westport Island | Lincoln | U | | 0.5 acres (0.20 ha) |
| 55-365 | College | | Long Island | Cumberland | R | | |
| 59-685 | Colt Head | | Deer Isle | Hancock | T | ME IF&W | 5 acres (2.0 ha) |
| 59-790 | Compass | | State of Maine | Hancock | R | Private, uninhabited | |
| 59-922 | Conary | Black | Deer Isle | Hancock | R | Private, "a bold shore, a good soil, and several families," according to an 1820 account, still accurate though the families are now summer rusticators | |
| 59-137 | Conary's Nub | | Blue Hill | Hancock | R | | |
| 63-372 | Coombs | | South Thomaston | Knox | R | | |
| 55-089 | Coombs (Lower) | | Brunswick | Cumberland | R | | |
| 55-088 | Coombs (Upper) | | Brunswick | Cumberland | R | | 8.6 acres (3.5 ha) |
| 65-181 | Coombs Ledge | | Bremen | Lincoln | U | | 1 acre (0.40 ha) |
| 79-123 | Coopers | | Lubec | Washington | R | | |
| 79-124 | Coopers Ledge | | Lubec | Washington | E | Not an island, submerged at mean high tide | |
| 63-573 | Coopers Ledge | Mouse | St. George | Knox | R | | |
| 63-572 | Coopers Ledge | | St. George | Knox | R | | |
| 63-571 | Coopers Ledge | | St. George | Knox | R | | |
| 59-900 | Coot | | Stonington | Hancock | R | | |
| 59-964 | Coot | Otter, Big Coombs | Stonington | Hancock | R | | |
| 59-902 | Coot | | Stonington | Hancock | R | | |
| 73-033 | Cornish | | Topsham | Sagadahoc | T | ME IF&W | 1 acre (0.40 ha) |
| 73-191 | Cotton | Rouse | Georgetown | Sagadahoc | R | | |
| 55-273 | Cousin's | | Yarmouth | Cumberland | E | Exempt — 4 or more residential structures | |
| 79-762 | Cove | Rockhead, Endland | Harrington | Washington | R | | |
| 65-399 | Cove Ledge (Little) | | Westport Island | Lincoln | R | | |
| 55-351 | Cow | | Long Island | Cumberland | R | | |
| 63-740 | Cow | Miller | Cushing | Knox | R | | |
| 65-175 | Cow | | Bremen | Lincoln | R | | 105 acres (42 ha) |
| 79-788 | Cow | | Harrington | Washington | R | | |
| 73-035 | Cow | | Topsham | Sagadahoc | R | | |
| 81-032 | Cow | | Biddeford | York | U | | 2 acres (0.81 ha) |
| 65-206 | Cow Island Ledge | | Bremen | Lincoln | U | | 1 acre (0.40 ha) |
| 63-283 | Cow Pens (The) | | Isle au Haut | Knox | E | Exempt - IF&W 1969 | |
| 63-284 | Cowpen | | Isle au Haut | Knox | T | ME IF&W | 1 acre (0.40 ha) |
| 55-256 | Crab | | Freeport | Cumberland | R | | |
| 63-760 | Cranberry | | Friendship | Knox | E | Exempt — 4 or more residential structures | |
| 63-765 | Cranberry (Lower) | Lower Point | Friendship | Knox | R | | |
| 59-270 | Cranberry (Great) | | Cranberry Isles | Hancock | E | Inhabited year round, many summer cottages, governed as its own township | |
| 59-313 | Cranberry (Little) | Islesford | Cranberry Isles | Hancock | E | Inhabited year round, many summer cottages, governed (with Great Cranberry) as its own township | |
| 79-536 | Cranberry Point | | Beals | Washington | R | | |
| 63-501 | Crane | | Vinalhaven | Knox | R | Private, seasonally inhabited | |
| 63-705 | Crane | | Friendship | Knox | R | | |
| 63-649 | Craw Island Ledge | | Muscle Ridge Shoals Twp. | Knox | U | | 0.5 acres (0.20 ha) |
| 73-072 | Crawford | Sheep | Bath | Sagadahoc | R | | |
| 63-411 | Crescent | | Muscle Ridge Shoals Twp. | Knox | T | ME IF&W | 1 acre (0.40 ha) |
| | Criehaven—see Ragged | | | | | | |
| 59-941 | Crockett's | | Stonington | Hancock | U | | 0.5 acres (0.20 ha) |
| 79-347 | Cross | | Cutler | Washington | R | One of fifty islands that make up the Maine Coastal Islands National Wildlife Refuge | 1,700 acres (280 ha) |
| 63-750 | Crotch | | Cushing | Knox | R | Used as a camp since 1905, recently for underprivileged children from New York City | |
| 63-497 | Crotch | | Vinalhaven | Knox | R | Private, summer cottage featuring unusual two-story outhouse | |
| 59-841 | Crotch | | Stonington | Hancock | R | Private, topography largely altered by extensive quarrying, last major Maine quarry in operation | |
| 65-173 | Crotch | | Bremen | Lincoln | T | ME IF&W | 2 acres (0.81 ha) |
| 65-171 | Crotch | | Bremen | Lincoln | U | | 2 acres (0.81 ha) |
| 65-172 | Crotch | | Bremen | Lincoln | U | | 2 acres (0.81 ha) |
| 63-737 | Crotch Island Ledges | | Friendship | Knox | T | ME IF&W | 0.5 acres (0.20 ha) |
| 79-839 | Crow | | Steuben | Washington | E | Exempt-Barred to Mainland Property | |
| 55-358 | Crow | | Long Island | Cumberland | E | Exempt-public ownership | |
| 55-130 | Crow | | Harpswell | Cumberland | R | | |
| 65-252 | Crow | | South Bristol | Lincoln | R | | |
| 65-334 | Crow | | Newcastle | Lincoln | R | | |
| 63-651 | Crow | | State of Maine | Knox | R | | |
| 73-123 | Crow | | Woolwich | Sagadahoc | R | | |
| 73-184 | Crow | | Arrowsic | Sagadahoc | R | | |
| 59-359 | Crow | | Swan's Island | Hancock | R | | |
| 59-448 | Crow | | Frenchboro | Hancock | R | | |
| 73-240 | Crow | | Georgetown | Sagadahoc | R | | |
| 73-182 | Crow | | Arrowsic | Sagadahoc | R | | |
| 59-946 | Crow | | Deer Isle | Hancock | R | | |
| 55-097 | Clark's | Carol's | Brunswick | Cumberland | R | | 0.5 acres (0.20 ha) |
| 55-098 | Crow | | Brunswick | Cumberland | R | | |
| 59-020 | Crow | | Winter Harbor | Hancock | R | | |
| 65-157 | Crow | | Bremen | Lincoln | R | | |
| 65-224 | Crow | | Bristol | Lincoln | R | | |
| 79-661 | Crow | | Jonesport | Washington | R | | |
| 55-331 | Crow | | Long Island | Cumberland | T | ME IF&W | 0.5 acres (0.20 ha) |
| 59-810 | Crow | | Deer Isle | Hancock | T | ME IF&W | 10 acres (4.0 ha) |
| 59-358 | Crow | | Swan's Island | Hancock | U | | 0.5 acres (0.20 ha) |
| 73-183 | Crow | | Arrowsic | Sagadahoc | U | | 0.5 acres (0.20 ha) |
| 55-411 | Crow | | Chebeague Island | Cumberland | U | | 2 acres (0.81 ha) |
| 65-166 | Crow | Narrows | Bremen | Lincoln | U | | 4 acres (1.6 ha) |
| 79-790 | Crow | | Milbridge | Washington | U | | 0.5 acres (0.20 ha) |
| 59-813 | Crow (Little) | | Deer Isle | Hancock | R | | |
| 73-270 | Crow (Small S.W.) | | Georgetown | Sagadahoc | R | | |
| 55-410 | Crow Island Ledge | | Chebeague Island | Cumberland | T | ME IF&W | 0.5 acres (0.20 ha) |
| 65-251 | Crow Island Ledge | | South Bristol | Lincoln | U | | 0.5 acres (0.20 ha) |
| 73-243 | Crow Island Ledge | | Georgetown | Sagadahoc | U | | 0.5 acres (0.20 ha) |
| 73-242 | Crow Island Ledge | | Georgetown | Sagadahoc | U | | 0.5 acres (0.20 ha) |
| 73-241 | Crow Island Ledge | | Georgetown | Sagadahoc | U | | 0.5 acres (0.20 ha) |
| 59-013 | Crow Ledge | | Winter Harbor | Hancock | U | | 0.5 acres (0.20 ha) |
| 79-080 | Crows Neck | | Trescott Twp. | Washington | R | | |
| 79-696 | Crumple | Little Tall Island | Beals | Washington | R | | |
| 63-047 | Cubby Hole | | North Haven | Knox | R | | |
| 73-330 | Cunner Rock | | Phippsburg | Sagadahoc | R | | |
| 73-309 | Cunner Rock | | Phippsburg | Sagadahoc | R | | |
| 65-015a | Cunningham (Little) | | Newcastle | Lincoln | R | | |
| 65-016a | Cunningham (Little) | | Newcastle | Lincoln | R | | |
| 79-697 | Curlew Rock | | Beals | Washington | T | ME IF&W | 2 acres (0.81 ha) |
| 79-915 | Currant | | Milbridge | Washington | R | | |
| 63-313 | Curtis | | Camden | Knox | R | Private, automated lighthouse, inhabited only seasonally, renamed in 1,938 acres (784 ha) | |
| 55-382 | Cushing | | Portland | Cumberland | E | Private, summer cottages, access for owners and renters only | |
| 63-406 | Cushing | | South Thomaston | Knox | R | | |
| 63-398 | Cutters Nubble | | Owls Head | Knox | R | | |
| 81-174 | Cutts | | Kittery | York | E | 4 or more residential structures exist on the island. | |
| 63-540 | Cylends | | St. George | Knox | R | | |
| 63-015 | Dagger | | North Haven | Knox | T | ME IF&W | 7 acres (2.8 ha) |
| 63-014 | Dagger Ledge | | North Haven | Knox | T | ME IF&W | 1 acre (0.40 ha) |
| 65-280 | Damariscove | | Boothbay | Lincoln | R | | |
| 79-433 | Daniels | | Addison | Washington | U | | 2 acres (0.81 ha) |
| 63-102 | Dark Brook | | Vinalhaven | Knox | R | | |
| 59-612 | Darling | | Blue Hill | Hancock | R | | |
| 65-447 | David | | Southport | Lincoln | E | Exempt — 4 or more residential structures | |
| 65-448 | David's (Little) | | Southport | Lincoln | R | | |
| 65-332 | Davis | | Edgecomb | Lincoln | E | Exempt — 4 or more residential structures | |
| 63-819 | Davis | Griffin | St. George | Knox | R | Private, wealthy rusticator's house with outbuildings, servants' quarters, lawns and gardens | |
| 59-442 | Dawes Ledge (Inner) | | Frenchboro | Hancock | T | ME IF&W | 0.5 acres (0.20 ha) |
| 63-675 | Dawn | | Friendship | Knox | R | | |
| 63-170 | Deadman Ledge | | Vinalhaven | Knox | T | ME IF&W | 2 acres (0.81 ha) |
| 59-323 | Deadman Point Ledge | | Cranberry Isles | Hancock | U | | 0.5 acres (0.20 ha) |
| 59-730 | Deer | | Deer Isle | Hancock | E | Exempt-4 or more structures | |
| 79-735 | Deer | | Harrington | Washington | R | | |
| 79-310 | Deer | | Cutler | Washington | R | | |
| 79-734 | Deer | | Harrington | Washington | R | | |
| 59-729 | Deer (Little) | | Deer Isle | Hancock | E | Exempt-4 or more structures | |
| 63-674 | Delano's | | Friendship | Knox | R | | |
| 79-151 | Denbow | | Lubec | Washington | U | | 0.5 acres (0.20 ha) |
| 65-470 | Devilled Rocks | | Southport | Lincoln | R | | |
| 59-962 | Devils | | Stonington | Hancock | E | Exempt — 4 or more residential structures | |
| 79-657 | Devil's | | Jonesport | Washington | R | | |
| 55-370 | Diamond (Great) | | Portland | Cumberland | E | Exempt — 4 or more residential structures; has a year-round population of approximately 80 | |
| 55-375 | Diamond (Little) | | Portland | Cumberland | E | Exempt-4 or more structures | |
| 55-380 | Diamond Island Ledge | | Portland | Cumberland | U | | 0.5 acres (0.20 ha) |
| 55-378 | Diamond Island Ledge | | Portland | Cumberland | U | | 0.5 acres (0.20 ha) |
| 63-171 | Diamond Rock | | Vinalhaven | Knox | U | | 1 acre (0.40 ha) |
| 55-046 | Dingley | | Harpswell | Cumberland | E | 4 or more residential structures | |
| 73-218 | Dix | | Phippsburg | Sagadahoc | R | | |
| 63-427 | Dix | | State of Maine | Knox | R | Private, former quarries (provided the granite for New York City Post Office), now summer rusticator cottages | |
| 63-380 | Dix Island Ledge | | Muscle Ridge Shoals Twp. | Knox | U | | 0.5 acres (0.20 ha) |
| 63-436 | Dix Ledge | | Muscle Ridge Shoals Twp. | Knox | U | | 0.5 acres (0.20 ha) |
| 63-434 | Dix Ledge | | Muscle Ridge Shoals Twp. | Knox | U | | 0.5 acres (0.20 ha) |
| 79-522 | Dobbins | Flying Place | Beals | Washington | R | | |
| 79-543 | Dobbins Ledge | | Beals | Washington | R | | |
| 79-544 | Dobbins Ledge | | Beals | Washington | R | | |
| 79-022 | Docket (Little) | Little Dochet | Robbinston | Washington | R | | |
| 65-097 | Dodge | | Edgecomb | Lincoln | R | | |
| 59-668 | Dog | | Brooksville | Hancock | R | | |
| 79-112 | Dog | | Eastport | Washington | U | | 0.5 acres (0.20 ha) |
| 55-136 | Dogfish | | Harpswell | Cumberland | R | | |
| 63-471 | Dogfish | | Vinalhaven | Knox | R | Summer cottagers only, no natural water source | |
| 55-135 | Dogfish | | Harpswell | Cumberland | U | | 0.5 acres (0.20 ha) |
| 63-474 | Dogfish (South) | | Vinalhaven | Knox | T | ME IF&W | 0.5 acres (0.20 ha) |
| 55-117 | Dogs Head | | Harpswell | Cumberland | R | | |
| 55-118 | Dog's Head | | Harpswell | Cumberland | U | | 0.5 acres (0.20 ha) |
| 55-119 | Dog's Head | | Harpswell | Cumberland | U | | 0.5 acres (0.20 ha) |
| 55-120 | Dog's Head | | Harpswell | Cumberland | U | | 0.5 acres (0.20 ha) |
| 65-195 | Dolins Island Ledges | | Bristol | Lincoln | U | | 0.5 acres (0.20 ha) |
| 63-276 | Doliver | | Isle au Haut | Knox | U | | 2 acres (0.81 ha) |
| 55-154 | Doll's | | Harpswell | Cumberland | R | | |
| 79-353 | Double Head Sh Ledge | | Cutler | Washington | U | | 0.5 acres (0.20 ha) |
| 79-579 | Double Shot | | Jonesport | Washington | R | | |
| 79-580 | Double Shot | | Jonesport | Washington | R | | |
| 79-577 | Double Shot | | Jonesport | Washington | R | | |
| 79-351 | Double Shot | | Cutler | Washington | R | | |
| 79-352 | Double Shot (Outer) | | Cutler | Washington | R | | |
| 55-105 | Doughty's | | Harpswell | Cumberland | R | Owned by conservation organization | 1.4 acres (0.57 ha) |
| 79-917 | Douglas (Big) | | Milbridge | Washington | R | | |
| 79-919 | Douglas (Little) | | Milbridge | Washington | R | | |
| 79-918 | Douglas (Middle) | | Milbridge | Washington | R | | |
| 79-921 | Douglas Island Ledge | | Milbridge | Washington | U | | 0.5 acres (0.20 ha) |
| 59-864 | Dow Ledge | | Stonington | Hancock | R | | |
| 59-863 | Dow Ledge | | Stonington | Hancock | R | | |
| 59-865 | Dow Ledge | | Stonington | Hancock | R | | |
| 79-419 | Doyle | Driscoes | Addison | Washington | R | | |
| 79-448 | Doyle | Driscoes | Addison | Washington | R | | |
| 73-171 | Drake's | | West Bath | Sagadahoc | R | | |
| 79-064 | Dram | | Pembroke | Washington | R | | |
| 59-187 | Dram | | Sorrento | Hancock | R | | |
| 79-067 | Dram (Little) | | Pembroke | Washington | T | ME IF&W | 1 acre (0.40 ha) |
| 79-611 | Drisko (Big) | | Addison | Washington | R | | |
| 79-638 | Drisko (Little) | | Addison | Washington | R | | |
| 79-507 | Drisko Ledge | | Jonesport | Washington | U | | 0.5 acres (0.20 ha) |
| 59-444 | Drum | | Frenchboro | Hancock | T | ME IF&W | 0.5 acres (0.20 ha) |
| 59-034 | Dry | | Gouldsboro | Hancock | U | | 0.5 acres (0.20 ha) |
| 59-366 | Dry Ledge | | Swan's Island | Hancock | R | | |
| 79-779 | Dry Ledge | | Harrington | Washington | T | ME IF&W | 0.5 acres (0.20 ha) |
| 63-879 | Dry Ledges | | St. George | Knox | U | | 0.6 acres (0.24 ha) |
| 73-205 | Dry Ledges | | Phippsburg | Sagadahoc | U | | 0.5 acres (0.20 ha) |
| 73-204 | Dry Ledges | | Phippsburg | Sagadahoc | U | | 0.5 acres (0.20 ha) |
| 73-203 | Dry Ledges | | Phippsburg | Sagadahoc | U | | 0.5 acres (0.20 ha) |
| 59-449 | Dry Money Ledge | | Frenchboro | Hancock | T | ME IF&W | 0.5 acres (0.20 ha) |
| 55-435 | Duck | Jacquish Ledge | Harpswell | Cumberland | R | | |
| 59-385 | Duck | | Swan's Island | Hancock | R | | |
| 63-122 | Duck | | Vinalhaven | Knox | R | | |
| 63-120 | Duck | | Vinalhaven | Knox | R | | |
| 63-121 | Duck | | Vinalhaven | Knox | R | | |
| 81-181 | Duck | | Kittery | York | R | | |
| 63-123 | Duck | | Vinalhaven | Knox | R | | |
| 59-440 | Duck (Great) | | Frenchboro | Hancock | R | Bought by The Nature Conservancy in 1984. Home to Great Duck Island Light. | 640 acres (260 ha) |
| 59-439 | Duck (Little) | | Frenchboro | Hancock | R | Acquired by National Audubon Society after WW II as wildlife preserve | |
| 73-132 | Duck (Little) | | Georgetown | Sagadahoc | R | | |
| 79-414 | Duck Ledges | | Addison | Washington | R | Deepwater anchorage, small cottage with outhouse, no plumbing (rainwater collected for cooking and washing) | 2 acres (0.81 ha) |
| 79-412 | Duck Ledges | | Addison | Washington | R | | |
| 79-413 | Duck Ledges | | Addison | Washington | R | | |
| 79-415 | Duck Ledges | | Addison | Washington | R | | |
| 55-156 | Duck Rock | | Harpswell | Cumberland | T | ME IF&W | 0.5 acres (0.20 ha) |
| 65-316 | Duck Rock (Inner) | | Monhegan Island Plt. | Lincoln | T | ME IF&W | 1 acre (0.40 ha) |
| 65-311 | Duck Rocks | | Monhegan Island Plt. | Lincoln | T | ME IF&W | 1 acre (0.40 ha) |
| 65-310 | Duck Rocks | | Monhegan Island Plt. | Lincoln | T | ME IF&W | 1 acre (0.40 ha) |
| 79-370 | Dudley | Rice's | Lubec | Washington | R | | |
| 63-347 | Dumplings | | North Haven | Knox | R | | |
| 63-348 | Dumplings | | North Haven | Knox | R | | |
| 63-349 | Dumplings | | North Haven | Knox | R | | |
| 63-350 | Dumplings | | North Haven | Knox | R | | |
| 63-352 | Dumplings | | North Haven | Knox | R | | |
| 63-351 | Dumplings | Cross | North Haven | Knox | R | | |
| 73-015 | Dunlap-Maxwell | | Bowdoinham | Sagadahoc | R | | |
| 79-468 | Dunn | | Jonesport | Washington | R | | |
| 79-767 | Dyer | | Harrington | Washington | R | | |
| 63-530 | Dyer | | Vinalhaven | Knox | R | Private, retreat for vacationing cottagers | |
| 79-109 | Dyer | | Eastport | Washington | R | | |
| 79-440 | Dyer | | Addison | Washington | R | Private, used exclusively by Berwick Boys Foundation for boys' summer camp | 750 acres (300 ha) |
| 63-531 | Dyer (Little) | | Vinalhaven | Knox | R | | |
| 59-793 | Eagle | | State of Maine | Hancock | E | Exempt-4 or more structures. Home to Eagle Island Light. | |
| 55-439 | Eagle | | Harpswell | Cumberland | E | Gift to State of Maine in 1955, now state parkland | 13.3 acres (5.4 ha) |
| 81-010 | Eagle | | Saco | York | R | | |
| 63-547 | Eagle | | St. George | Knox | R | Private, some quarrying, now uninhabited | 5 acres (2.0 ha) |
| 79-751 | Eagle | | Addison | Washington | R | | |
| 63-795 | Eagle | | St. George | Knox | R | | |
| 59-349 | Eagle | | Swan's Island | Hancock | R | Private, reverting to natural state | |
| 63-796 | Eagle (East) | | St. George | Knox | R | | |
| 79-843 | Eastern | | Steuben | Washington | R | | |
| 79-850 | Eastern | | Steuben | Washington | R | | |
| 65-313 | Eastern Duck Rock | | Monhegan Island Plt. | Lincoln | E | Exempt - IF&W 1971 | |
| 63-295 | Eastern Ear | | Isle au Haut | Knox | R | Privately owned, no trespassing, no permitted uses or access, no visitors permitted | |
| 79-303 | Eastern Head | Little River Ledge | Cutler | Washington | R | | |
| 79-324 | Eastern Head Ledges | | Trescott Twp. | Washington | T | Maine Bur. of Parks & Lands | 0.5 acres (0.20 ha) |
| 81-183 | Eastern Rock | | Kittery | York | R | | |
| 59-716 | Eaton Rock Island Ledge | | State of Maine | Hancock | T | ME IF&W | 0.5 acres (0.20 ha) |
| 59-714 | Eaton's | | Deer Isle | Hancock | R | Private, usually conveyed along with neighbor Pickering Island | 12 acres (4.9 ha) |
| 59-713 | Eaton's (Little) | | Deer Isle | Hancock | R | | |
| 63-409 | Eben's | Tommy | South Thomaston | Knox | R | Private, summer rusticator cottage | |
| 59-301 | Egg Rock | | Winter Harbor | Hancock | E | Coast Guard lighthouse and fog signal | |
| 63-727 | Egg Rock | | Friendship | Knox | R | | |
| 79-935 | Egg Rock | | Milbridge | Washington | T | ME IF&W | 3 acres (1.2 ha) |
| 79-927 | Egg Rock | | Milbridge | Washington | T | ME IF&W | 3 acres (1.2 ha) |
| 79-605 | Egg Rock | | Beals | Washington | T | ME IF&W | 2 acres (0.81 ha) |
| 63-333 | Egg Rock | | North Haven | Knox | T | ME IF&W | 0.5 acres (0.20 ha) |
| 59-950 | Egg Rock | | Swans Island | Hancock | U | | 0.5 acres (0.20 ha) |
| 63-860 | Egg Rock (Eastern) | | St. George | Knox | T | ME IF&W | 9 acres (3.6 ha) |
| 63-873 | Egg Rock (Little) | Skeeter Rock | St. George | Knox | T | ME IF&W | 2 acres (0.81 ha) |
| 73-286 | Egg Rocks | Fox Islands | Phippsburg | Sagadahoc | R | | |
| 73-285 | Egg Rocks | Fox Islands | Phippsburg | Sagadahoc | R | | |
| 73-319 | Ellingwood | | Georgetown | Sagadahoc | T | ME IF&W | 0.5 acres (0.20 ha) |
| 79-010 | Elliot Flats | | Calais | Washington | U | | 0.5 acres (0.20 ha) |
| 73-223 | Elliott's | | Georgetown | Sagadahoc | R | | |
| 55-173 | Elm (1) | | Harpswell | Cumberland | U | | 1 acre (0.40 ha) |
| 55-174 | Elm (2) | | Harpswell | Cumberland | U | | 1 acre (0.40 ha) |
| 63-543 | Elwell | | St. George | Knox | R | Private, once inhabited by coastal trader and fisherman, but no longer inhabited | |
| 63-400 | Emery | | Owls Head | Knox | R | | |
| 59-975 | Enchanted | | Stonington | Hancock | R | | |
| 77-075 | Ensign (#1) | | Islesboro | Waldo | R | Acquired in 1910 by illustrator Charles Dana Gibson, whose descendants still summer on nearby Seven Hundred Acre Island | |
| 77-076 | Ensign (#2) | | Islesboro | Waldo | R | | |
| 63-720 | Eugley's | | Friendship | Knox | R | | |
| 63-722 | Eugley's | | Friendship | Knox | R | | |
| 65-155 | Eves | | Bremen | Lincoln | R | | |
| 73-083 | Ewe | | Woolwich | Sagadahoc | R | | |
| 63-202 | Ewe | | Isle au Haut | Knox | R | Private | |
| 73-082 | Ewe | | Woolwich | Sagadahoc | U | | 0.5 acres (0.20 ha) |
| 73-081 | Ewe | | Woolwich | Sagadahoc | U | | 0.5 acres (0.20 ha) |
| 81-031 | Factory | | Saco | York | E | Exempt — 4 or more residential structures | |
| 63-108 | Falls | | Vinalhaven | Knox | R | | |
| 79-061 | Falls | | Trescott Twp. | Washington | R | | |
| 59-111 | Falls Point Ledge | | Sullivan | Hancock | T | ME IF&W | 0.5 acres (0.20 ha) |
| 79-560 | Fan | | Roque Bluffs | Washington | U | | 1 acre (0.40 ha) |
| 65-124 | Farmers | | South Bristol | Lincoln | E | Exempt — 4 or more residential structures | |
| 79-785 | Farr Head | | Milbridge | Washington | R | | |
| 59-839 | Farrell's | Kimball's | Stonington | Hancock | R | | |
| 63-755 | Farther Little | | Friendship | Knox | R | | |
| 79-392 | Featherbed | | Machiasport | Washington | R | Privately owned, deeded to G&M Lamb. No water or electricity. Land bridge at low tide | <1 acre (0.40 ha) |
| 79-464 | Fellows | Looks | Roque Bluffs | Washington | R | | |
| 63-478 | Fiddlehead | | Vinalhaven | Knox | R | | |
| 59-680 | Fiddlehead Ledge | | Deer Isle | Hancock | R | | |
| 55-067 | Fir | | Harpswell | Cumberland | R | | |
| 59-363 | Fir Point | | Swan's Island | Hancock | R | | |
| 59-364 | Fir Point Ledges | | Swan's Island | Hancock | U | | 0.5 acres (0.20 ha) |
| 77-040 | Fire | | Northport | Waldo | R | | |
| 79-833 | Fish | | Steuben | Washington | R | | |
| 65-291 | Fish Hawk | | Boothbay Harbor | Lincoln | U | | 0.5 acres (0.20 ha) |
| 65-238 | Fish Hawk | | Boothbay Harbor | Lincoln | U | | 0.5 acres (0.20 ha) |
| 65-274 | Fisherman | | Boothbay | Lincoln | R | | |
| 79-694 | Fisherman | | Beals | Washington | R | | |
| 63-402 | Fisherman's | | State of Maine | Knox | R | Private; cormorants, eider ducks and other birds "have rendered the island effectively unusable by man" | |
| 81-179 | Fishing | | Kittery | York | R | | |
| 79-772 | Five | | Harrington | Washington | R | | |
| 79-770 | Five | | Harrington | Washington | U | | 1 acre (0.40 ha) |
| 79-769 | Five | | Harrington | Washington | U | | 1 acre (0.40 ha) |
| 79-771 | Five | | Harrington | Washington | U | | 0.5 acres (0.20 ha) |
| 73-146 | Flag Island Ledge | | Phippsburg | Sagadahoc | U | | 0.5 acres (0.20 ha) |
| 55-177 | Flagg | | Harpswell | Cumberland | E | Maine Dept. Fisheries | 26.2 acres (10.6 ha) |
| 63-632 | Flagg | | Muscle Ridge Shoals Twp. | Knox | R | | |
| 55-415 | Flagg (Upper) | | Harpswell | Cumberland | R | | 34.1 acres (13.8 ha) |
| 59-806 | Flagstaff | | Stonington | Hancock | R | | |
| 63-217 | Flake (Big) | | Isle au Haut | Knox | R | | |
| 63-216 | Flake (Little) | | Isle au Haut | Knox | R | | |
| 63-748 | Flap Jack | | Cushing | Knox | R | | |
| 55-144 | Flash | | Harpswell | Cumberland | T | ME IF&W | 2 acres (0.81 ha) |
| 77-047 | Flat | | Islesboro | Waldo | E | State of Maine bird sanctuary, managed by IF&W | |
| 59-014 | Flat | | Winter Harbor | Hancock | R | | |
| 79-621 | Flat | | Addison | Washington | R | | |
| 59-808 | Flat | | Deer Isle | Hancock | R | | |
| 63-106 | Flat | | Vinalhaven | Knox | R | | |
| 59-876 | Flea | Flat | Stonington | Hancock | R | | |
| 63-787 | Flea | | Cushing | Knox | R | | |
| 59-794 | Fling | | State of Maine | Hancock | R | Private, uninhabited | |
| 79-903 | Flint | | Harrington | Washington | R | | |
| 59-752 | Flye's | | Brooklin | Hancock | R | | |
| 55-248 | Flying Point | | Freeport | Cumberland | R | | |
| 55-636 | Flying Point (Little) | | Freeport | Cumberland | R | | |
| 63-263 | Fog Island | | Isle au Haut | Knox | T | ME IF&W-- dangerous tidal eddies and seas, site of several drownings | 0.5 acres (0.20 ha) |
| 63-297 | Fog Island Ledge | | Isle au Haut | Knox | U | | 0.5 acres (0.20 ha) |
| 63-264 | Fogg | | Isle au Haut | Knox | R | | |
| 59-233 | Folly | | Mount Desert | Hancock | R | | |
| 81-101 | Folly | | Kennebunkport | York | R | | |
| 63-163 | Folly Ledge | | Vinalhaven | Knox | U | | 0.5 acres (0.20 ha) |
| 65-121 | Fort | | Boothbay | Lincoln | E | Exempt - Parks and Recreation | |
| 59-826 | Fort | Sheep | Stonington | Hancock | R | Private, uninhabited | |
| 79-737 | Fort | | Harrington | Washington | R | | |
| 79-736 | Fort (Little) | Guard | Harrington | Washington | R | | |
| 79-551 | Foster | | Machiasport | Washington | R | | |
| 79-789 | Foster | | Harrington | Washington | R | | |
| 73-034 | Foster's | | Topsham | Sagadahoc | R | | |
| 65-117 | Foster's | | South Bristol | Lincoln | R | | |
| 65-051 | Fox | | Waldoboro | Lincoln | R | | |
| 73-236 | Fox | | Georgetown | Sagadahoc | R | | |
| 79-155 | Fox | | Lubec | Washington | R | | |
| 73-284 | Fox | | Phippsburg | Sagadahoc | R | | |
| 73-269 | Fox | Thompsons | Georgetown | Sagadahoc | R | | |
| 65-346 | Foxbird | Head Of The Nick | Wiscasset | Lincoln | R | | |
| 65-349 | Foxbird | Head Of The Nick | Wiscasset | Lincoln | R | | |
| 65-348 | Foxbird | Head Of The Nick | Wiscasset | Lincoln | R | | |
| 65-347 | Foxbird | Head Of The Nick | Wiscasset | Lincoln | R | | |
| 81-211 | Frankfort | | Eliot | York | R | | |
| 63-707 | Franklin | | Friendship | Knox | E | Exempt - Dept. of Interior; home to Franklin Island Light | |
| 63-708 | Franklin Ledge (Little) | | Friendship | Knox | T | ME IF&W | 0.5 acres (0.20 ha) |
| 79-191 | Freds | | Trescott Twp. | Washington | R | | |
| 79-194 | Fred's | | Trescott Twp. | Washington | R | | |
| 79-193 | Fred's | | Trescott Twp. | Washington | R | | |
| 79-192 | Fred's | | Trescott Twp. | Washington | R | | |
| 79-676 | Freeman Rock | | Jonesport | Washington | T | ME IF&W | 2 acres (0.81 ha) |
| 59-936 | Freese | | Deer Isle | Hancock | U | | 1 acre (0.40 ha) |
| 59-915 | Freese | | Deer Isle | Hancock | U | | 0.5 acres (0.20 ha) |
| 59-939 | Freese | | Deer Isle | Hancock | U | | 1 acre (0.40 ha) |
| 59-938 | Freese | | Deer Isle | Hancock | U | | 0.5 acres (0.20 ha) |
| 59-940 | Freeze (Big) | | Deer Isle | Hancock | R | Private, used as summer retreat | |
| 59-942 | Freeze (Little) | | Deer Isle | Hancock | R | Private, remains in natural state | 3 acres (1.2 ha) |
| | Frenchboro—see Long (Frenchboro) | | | | | | |
| 79-523 | French House | | Beals | Washington | R | | |
| 55-271 | French's | Long Ledge | Freeport | Cumberland | R | Private | |
| 55-269 | French's | | Freeport | Cumberland | R | Private | |
| 55-267 | French's (Little) | | Freeport | Cumberland | R | | |
| 55-268 | French's Ledge | | Freeport | Cumberland | R | Private | |
| 55-270 | French's Ledge | | Freeport | Cumberland | R | Private | |
| 55-014 | Freyee | | Brunswick | Cumberland | T | Owned by the ME IF&W | 2 acres (0.81 ha) |
| 55-015 | Freyee | | Brunswick | Cumberland | T | Owned by the ME IF&W | 2 acres (0.81 ha) |
| 55-012 | Freyee | | Brunswick | Cumberland | T | Owned by the Maine Department of Inland Fisheries & Wildlife (ME IF&W) | 9 acres (3.6 ha) |
| 55-013 | Freyee | | Brunswick | Cumberland | T | Owned by the ME IF&W | 3 acres (1.2 ha) |
| 63-754 | Friendship | Friendship Long | Friendship | Knox | E | Exempt — 4 or more residential structures | |
| 73-030 | Friers | | Topsham | Sagadahoc | R | | |
| 79-101 | Frost | | Perry | Washington | U | | 2 acres (0.81 ha) |
| (unnumbered) | Frye | | Frye Island | Cumberland | U | Freshwater island in Sebago Lake, seasonal May–October, private cottages, some public beaches | 1,024 acres (414 ha) |
| 73-308 | Fuller's Rock | | Phippsburg | Sagadahoc | R | | |
| 65-132 | Gall Rock | | Boothbay | Lincoln | U | | 0.5 acres (0.20 ha) |
| 55-232 | Gallows | | Harpswell | Cumberland | R | | |
| 59-748 | Gander | | Brooklin | Hancock | R | | |
| 63-773 | Gangway Ledge | | Friendship | Knox | U | | 0.5 acres (0.20 ha) |
| 59-756 | Gangway Ledge | | Brooklin | Hancock | U | | 1 acre (0.40 ha) |
| 63-420 | Garden | | South Thomaston | Knox | E | Exempt - IF&W 1970 | |
| 59-372 | Garden | | Swan's Island | Hancock | R | | |
| 59-371 | Garden | | Swan's Island | Hancock | R | | |
| 63-509 | Garden (Big) | | Vinalhaven | Knox | R | Private, given as a wedding present to Charles A. Lindbergh in 1929, given by the Lindberghs to The Nature Conservancy in 1969, now used by day picnickers | |
| 63-511 | Garden (Little) | | Vinalhaven | Knox | R | | |
| 63-776 | Garnet | | Friendship | Knox | R | | |
| 63-735 | Garrison | | Friendship | Knox | R | | |
| 63-842 | Gay | | Cushing | Knox | R | | |
| 63-790 | Gay's | Burton's | Cushing | Knox | E | Exempt — 4 or more residential structures | |
| 65-232 | Gem | | South Bristol | Lincoln | R | | |
| 55-078 | George | | Harpswell | Cumberland | R | | |
| 59-896 | George Head Ledge | | Stonington | Hancock | U | | 1 acre (0.40 ha) |
| 59-894 | Georges Head | | Stonington | Hancock | R | | |
| 81-175 | Gerrish | | Kittery | York | E | 4 or more residential structures exist on the island. | |
| 79-738 | Gibbs | | Addison | Washington | R | | |
| 79-210 | Gilbert's | | Lubec | Washington | R | | |
| 79-907 | Gimlet | | Harrington | Washington | R | | |
| 65-101 | Glidden Ledge | | South Bristol | Lincoln | U | | 0.5 acres (0.20 ha) |
| 81-100 | Goat | | Kennebunkport | York | E | Exempt - Dept. of Interior. Home to Goat Island Light. | |
| 73-179 | Goat | | Phippsburg | Sagadahoc | U | | 2 acres (0.81 ha) |
| 73-260 | Good Harbor (Little) | | Georgetown | Sagadahoc | R | | |
| 63-336 | Goose | | North Haven | Knox | E | Exempt - IF&W 1969 | |
| 79-126 | Goose | | Eastport | Washington | R | | |
| 65-333 | Goose | | Edgecomb | Lincoln | R | | |
| 79-732 | Goose | | Addison | Washington | R | | |
| 59-749 | Goose | | Brooklin | Hancock | R | | |
| 59-927 | Goose (Little) | | Deer Isle | Hancock | R | | |
| 55-255 | Goose (Lower) | | Harpswell | Cumberland | E | Exempt — 4 or more residential structures | |
| 79-423 | Goose (Outer) | | Addison | Washington | R | | |
| 55-251 | Goose (Upper) | | Harpswell | Cumberland | R | | |
| 59-239 | Goose Cove Rock | | Tremont | Hancock | R | | |
| 59-817 | Goose Island | | Deer Isle | Hancock | U | | 0.5 acres (0.20 ha) |
| 55-276 | Goose Island Ledge (Little) | | Harpswell | Cumberland | U | | 0.5 acres (0.20 ha) |
| 65-023 | Goose Ledges | | Newcastle | Lincoln | T | P | 0.5 acres (0.20 ha) |
| 55-400 | Goose Nest | | Chebeague Island | Cumberland | T | P | 1 acre (0.40 ha) |
| 59-135 | Goose Rock | | Surry | Hancock | R | | |
| 63-792 | Goose Rock | | St. George | Knox | T | ME IF&W | 0.5 acres (0.20 ha) |
| 63-335 | Goose Rock (East) | | North Haven | Knox | T | ME IF&W | 1 acre (0.40 ha) |
| 81-036 | Goose Rock (East) | | Kennebunkport | York | U | | 1 acre (0.40 ha) |
| 63-035 | Goose Rocks | | North Haven | Knox | R | | |
| 63-314 | Goose Rocks | | Rockport | Knox | T | ME IF&W | 1 acre (0.40 ha) |
| 81-040 | Goose Rocks (West) | | Kennebunkport | York | T | ME IF&W | 1 acre (0.40 ha) |
| 81-041 | Goose Rocks (West) | | Kennebunkport | York | T | ME IF&W | 1 acre (0.40 ha) |
| 79-226 | Gooseberry | | Lubec | Washington | R | | |
| 79-235 | Gooseberry | | Lubec | Washington | R | | |
| 59-969 | Gooseberry | | Stonington | Hancock | R | | |
| 81-165 | Gooseberry | | Kittery | York | R | | |
| 65-353 | Gooseberry | | Boothbay | Lincoln | R | | |
| 79-219 | Gooseberry | | Lubec | Washington | R | | 5 acres (2.0 ha) |
| 59-398 | Gooseberry | | Swan's Island | Hancock | R | | |
| 81-025 | Gooseberry | | Biddeford | York | T | ME IF&W | 2 acres (0.81 ha) |
| 73-301 | Gooseberry | | Phippsburg | Sagadahoc | U | | 1 acre (0.40 ha) |
| 63-757 | Gooseberry | | Friendship | Knox | U | | 0.5 acres (0.20 ha) |
| 63-417 | Gooseberry Nub | | Muscle Ridge Shoals Twp. | Knox | R | | |
| 79-750 | Gooseberry Nub | | Addison | Washington | U | | 1 acre (0.40 ha) |
| 73-289 | Gooserock | | Phippsburg | Sagadahoc | R | | |
| 73-290 | Gooserock | | Phippsburg | Sagadahoc | R | | |
| 55-262 | Goslings (The) | | Harpswell | Cumberland | R | The Goslings are a group of three small islands known for their sand beaches, campsites, and opportunities for kayaking, picnicking, and wildlife observation. Maine Coast Heritage Trust acquired these islands for conservation and public use in 2014. | |
| 55-263 | Goslings (The) | | Harpswell | Cumberland | R | | |
| 59-435 | Gott (Great) | | Tremont | Hancock | E | Exempt-4 or more structures | |
| 59-436 | Gott (Little) | Bar | Tremont | Hancock | R | | |
| 59-454 | Gott Ledge (Little) | | Tremont | Hancock | U | | 0.5 acres (0.20 ha) |
| 63-634 | Graffam | | State of Maine | Knox | R | Private, summer cottage | |
| 63-046 | Grandfathers | | North Haven | Knox | R | | |
| 59-802 | Grass Ledge | | Deer Isle | Hancock | T | ME IF&W | 2 acres (0.81 ha) |
| 59-789 | Grass Ledges | | Deer Isle | Hancock | E | Exempt - IF&W 1969 | |
| 55-259 | Grassy Ledge | | Harpswell | Cumberland | T | ME IF&W | 1 acre (0.40 ha) |
| 59-583 | Gravel | | Penobscot | Hancock | R | | |
| 73-098 | Great | | Woolwich | Sagadahoc | R | | |
| 55-019 | Great | Driscoll | Brunswick | Cumberland | R | Owned by the town of Brunswick | |
| 65-465 | Great Cape | | Southport | Lincoln | R | | |
| 63-290 | Great Spoon Ledge | | Isle au Haut | Knox | R | | |
| 79-535 | Great Spruce Ledge | | Jonesport | Washington | R | | |
| 59-784 | Great Spruce Ledge | | Deer Isle | Hancock | U | | 0.5 acres (0.20 ha) |
| 79-929 | Green | | Milbridge | Washington | E | Exempt - IF&W | |
| 59-877 | Green | | Stonington | Hancock | R | | |
| 59-751 | Green | | Brooklin | Hancock | R | | |
| 59-128 | Green | | Bar Harbor | Hancock | R | | |
| 73-048 | Green | | Bath | Sagadahoc | R | | |
| 65-423 | Green | | Southport | Lincoln | R | | |
| 79-666 | Green | | Jonesport | Washington | R | | |
| 63-127 | Green | Greer | Vinalhaven | Knox | R | | |
| 79-624 | Green | | Addison | Washington | R | | |
| 59-478 | Green | | Swan's Island | Hancock | R | Private, uninhabited | |
| 63-129 | Green | Greer | Vinalhaven | Knox | R | | |
| 73-063 | Green | | Bath | Sagadahoc | T | ME IF&W | 1 acre (0.40 ha) |
| 59-446 | Green | | Frenchboro | Hancock | T | ME IF&W | 5 acres (2.0 ha) |
| 79-572 | Green | | Jonesport | Washington | T | ME IF&W | 3 acres (1.2 ha) |
| 59-344 | Green | | Brooklin | Hancock | U | | 1.8 acres (0.73 ha) |
| 65-268 | Green | | Boothbay | Lincoln | U | | 1 acre (0.40 ha) |
| 79-677 | Green | | Beals | Washington | U | | |
| 63-125 | Green | | Vinalhaven | Knox | U | | 1 acre (0.40 ha) |
| 55-499 | Green (Inner) | | Portland | Cumberland | E | Exempt - IF&W 1971 | 3.0 acres (1.2 ha) |
| 63-655 | Green (Large) | | Matinicus Isle Plt. | Knox | E | exempt — 4 or more residential structures | |
| 63-485 | Green (Little) | | Vinalhaven | Knox | E | Exempt - IF&W | |
| 63-418 | Green (Little) | | State of Maine | Knox | R | | |
| 65-422 | Green (Little) | | Southport | Lincoln | R | | |
| 63-654 | Green (Little) | | Matinicus Isle Plt. | Knox | R | Small, barren island, uninhabited, close to Metinic | 2 acres (0.81 ha) |
| 65-421 | Green (Little) | | Southport | Lincoln | R | | |
| 55-386 | Green (Outer) | | Long Island | Cumberland | E | Exempt-4 or more structures | 5.4 acres (2.2 ha) |
| 63-156 | Green Island Knob | | Vinalhaven | Knox | U | | 0.5 acres (0.20 ha) |
| 59-445 | Green Island Ledge | | Frenchboro | Hancock | T | ME IF&W | 2 acres (0.81 ha) |
| 59-750 | Green Island Ledge | | Brooklin | Hancock | T | ME IF&W | 0.5 acres (0.20 ha) |
| 63-266 | Green Ledge | | Isle au Haut | Knox | E | Exempt - public ownership | |
| 63-493 | Green Ledge | | Vinalhaven | Knox | T | ME IF&W | 2 acres (0.81 ha) |
| 59-674 | Green Ledge | | Deer Isle | Hancock | T | ME IF&W | 1 acre (0.40 ha) |
| 63-929 | Green Ledge | | Criehaven Twp. | Knox | T | ME IF&W | 2 acres (0.81 ha) |
| 59-949 | Green Ledge | | Deer Isle | Hancock | T | ME IF&W | 1 acre (0.40 ha) |
| 63-158 | Green Ledge | | Vinalhaven | Knox | U | | 0.5 acres (0.20 ha) |
| 55-071 | Green Ledge | | Harpswell | Cumberland | U | Owned by the Town of Harpswell | 0.5 acres (0.20 ha) |
| 63-159 | Green Ledge | | Vinalhaven | Knox | U | | 0.5 acres (0.20 ha) |
| 55-485 | Green Ledge (Outer) | | Long Island | Cumberland | T | ME IF&W | 0.5 acres (0.20 ha) |
| 63-585 | Green Metinic | | Matinicus Isle Plt. | Knox | R | | |
| 59-315 | Green Nubble | | Cranberry Isles | Hancock | R | | |
| 59-268 | Greening | | Southwest Harbor | Hancock | E | Private, some summer cottages, western 3/4 of island under conservation easement managed by Acadia National Park | |
| 63-157 | Green's | | Vinalhaven | Knox | E | Private (named for a man, not the color) former whale oil trying works, quarry, some year-round residence and summer rusticator cottages, lighthouse at Heron Neck | |
| 63-817 | Griffin (Little) | Little Davis | St. George | Knox | R | | |
| 63-818 | Griffin Ledge (Little) | | St. George | Knox | R | | |
| 59-861 | Grog | | Stonington | Hancock | R | Private, used by a single owner for summer vacation home. Private, uninhabited. | 5 acres (2.0 ha) |
| 59-860 | Grogg Ledge | | Stonington | Hancock | U | | 0.5 acres (0.20 ha) |
| 81-145 | Gull | | Ogunquit | York | R | | |
| 59-166 | Gull Ledge | | Sorrento | Hancock | U | | 0.5 acres (0.20 ha) |
| 59-167 | Gull Ledge | | Sorrento | Hancock | U | | 0.5 acres (0.20 ha) |
| 59-168 | Gull Ledge | | Sorrento | Hancock | U | | 0.5 acres (0.20 ha) |
| 59-169 | Gull Ledge | | Sorrento | Hancock | U | | 0.5 acres (0.20 ha) |
| 59-812 | Gull Ledge | | Deer Isle | Hancock | U | | 0.5 acres (0.20 ha) |
| 63-718 | Gull Rock | | Cushing | Knox | R | | |
| 63-724 | Gull Rock | | Friendship | Knox | T | ME IF&W | 0.5 acres (0.20 ha) |
| 79-565 | Gull Rock | | Roque Bluffs | Washington | U | | 0.5 acres (0.20 ha) |
| 79-116 | Gull Rock | | Eastport | Washington | U | | 0.5 acres (0.20 ha) |
| 63-488 | Gundell | Gondola, Cundell | Vinalhaven | Knox | R | | |
| 59-976 | Gunning Rock | | Stonington | Hancock | T | ME IF&W | 0.5 acres (0.20 ha) |
| 63-836 | Gunning Rocks | | St. George | Knox | T | ME IF&W | 1.4 acres (0.57 ha) |
| 63-578 | Gunning Rocks | | St. George | Knox | T | ME IF&W | 3 acres (1.2 ha) |
| 65-200 | Haddock | | Bristol | Lincoln | R | | |
| 55-438 | Haddock | | Harpswell | Cumberland | T | ME IF&W | 1 acre (0.40 ha) |
| 79-107 | Half Moon | | Eastport | Washington | R | | |
| 55-502 | Halfway | | Chebeague Island | Cumberland | U | Home to Halfway Rock Light, midway across the outer reaches of Casco Bay | 0.5 acres (0.20 ha) |
| 63-207 | Halibut Ledge (West) | | Isle au Haut | Knox | T | ME IF&W | 0.5 acres (0.20 ha) |
| 63-206 | Halibut Ledge (West) | | Isle au Haut | Knox | T | ME IF&W | 1 acre (0.40 ha) |
| 59-979 | Halibut Rock | | Swan's Island | Hancock | U | | 2.3 acres (0.93 ha) |
| 59-991 | Halibut Rocks | | Swan's Island | Hancock | T | ME IF&W | 2 acres (0.81 ha) |
| 79-570 | Halifax | | Jonesport | Washington | R | | |
| 63-702 | Hall | | Friendship | Knox | R | | |
| 63-704 | Hall (Little) | | Friendship | Knox | R | | |
| 79-663 | Hall's | | Jonesport | Washington | R | | |
| 55-121 | Hamloaf | Ham? | Harpswell | Cumberland | R | | |
| 55-042 | Hammond | | Harpswell | Cumberland | R | private | 2.5 acres (1.0 ha) |
| 59-932 | Harbor | Naskeag | Brooklin | Hancock | R | Private, used by summer rusticators | |
| 59-400 | Harbor | | Swan's Island | Hancock | R | Private; Harbor Island Trust corporation manages island for summer cottagers. | |
| 63-710 | Harbor | Rum Cove | Friendship | Knox | R | | |
| 59-700 | Harbor | | Brooksville | Hancock | R | | |
| 65-428 | Harbor | | Boothbay Harbor | Lincoln | R | | |
| 59-450 | Harbor | | Frenchboro | Hancock | R | Private, seasonal two-bedroom cottage, no electricity | 30 acres (12 ha) |
| 73-198 | Harbor | | Phippsburg | Sagadahoc | R | | |
| 63-502 | Harbor | | Vinalhaven | Knox | R | | |
| 63-701 | Harbor | | Friendship | Knox | R | | |
| 63-203 | Harbor | | Isle au Haut | Knox | U | Private | 11 acres (4.5 ha) |
| 73-294 | Harbor (Little) | | Phippsburg | Sagadahoc | R | | |
| 63-926 | Harbor Ledges | | Criehaven Twp. | Knox | U | | 1 acre (0.40 ha) |
| 59-782 | Hardhead | | State of Maine | Hancock | R | | 5 acres (2.0 ha) |
| 59-236 | Hardwood | | Tremont | Hancock | R | | |
| 79-410 | Hardwood | | Addison | Washington | R | | |
| 63-204 | Hardwood | | Isle au Haut | Knox | R | Private, unused | |
| 79-531 | Hardwood (Inner) | | Jonesport | Washington | R | | |
| 79-662 | Hardwood (Little) | | Jonesport | Washington | R | | |
| 79-504 | Hardwood (Middle) | | Jonesport | Washington | R | | |
| 65-036 | Hardy | | Waldoboro | Lincoln | R | | |
| 65-361 | Harper | | Westport Island | Lincoln | R | | |
| 81-125 | Harris | | York | York | E | Exempt — 4 or more residential structures | |
| 63-833 | Hart | | St. George | Knox | R | | |
| 59-811 | Hart | Heart | Deer Isle | Hancock | R | Private, summer cottage | |
| 55-417 | Haskell | | Harpswell | Cumberland | E | Exempt - 4 or more structures | |
| 59-412 | Hat | | Swan's Island | Hancock | R | Private, summer cottages | |
| 65-059 | Havener Ledge | | Waldoboro | Lincoln | U | | 2 acres (0.81 ha) |
| 65-060 | Havener Ledge | | Waldoboro | Lincoln | U | | 0.5 acres (0.20 ha) |
| 79-731 | Hawthorne Ledge | | Harrington | Washington | U | | 0.5 acres (0.20 ha) |
| 63-169 | Hay | | Vinalhaven | Knox | R | Private, uninhabited | |
| 63-638 | Hay | Seal | St. George | Knox | R | | |
| 65-245 | Hay | | South Bristol | Lincoln | R | | |
| 63-091 | Hay | | Vinalhaven | Knox | U | | 9 acres (3.6 ha) |
| 59-937 | Hay (Big) | | Deer Isle | Hancock | R | | |
| 63-187 | Hay Island Nubble | | Vinalhaven | Knox | R | | |
| 79-625 | Hay Ledge | | Addison | Washington | U | | 0.5 acres (0.20 ha) |
| 63-582 | Hay Ledge | | St. George | Knox | R | | |
| 63-092 | Hay Ledge | | Vinalhaven | Knox | U | | 0.5 acres (0.20 ha) |
| 65-081 | Haystack | | Waldoboro | Lincoln | R | | |
| 55-240 | Haywards Point | | Harpswell | Cumberland | E | Exempt — 4 or more residential structures | |
| 73-303 | Head Beach | Joe's Head | Phippsburg | Sagadahoc | U | | 1 acre (0.40 ha) |
| 79-500 | Head Harbor | | Jonesport | Washington | E | Exempt — 4 or more residential structures | |
| 65-063 | Heather | | Waldoboro | Lincoln | R | | |
| 59-961 | Hell's Half Acre | | Stonington | Hancock | U | | 2 acres (0.81 ha) |
| 79-733 | Hemlock | | Addison | Washington | R | | |
| 55-077 | Hen | | Harpswell | Cumberland | E | 4 or more residential structures | |
| 73-249 | Hen | | Georgetown | Sagadahoc | R | | |
| 63-545 | Hen | | St. George | Knox | R | | |
| 73-131 | Hen | | Woolwich | Sagadahoc | R | | |
| 59-945 | Hen | | Deer Isle | Hancock | R | | |
| 59-663 | Hen | | Brooksville | Hancock | R | | |
| 63-147 | Hen | | Vinalhaven | Knox | R | | |
| 73-178 | Hen | | Phippsburg | Sagadahoc | T | ME IF&W | 0.5 acres (0.20 ha) |
| 59-388 | Hen | | Swan's Island | Hancock | U | | 0.5 acres (0.20 ha) |
| 59-387 | Hen | | Swan's Island | Hancock | U | | 2 acres (0.81 ha) |
| 55-080 | Hen (Big) | | Harpswell | Cumberland | R | | |
| 63-078 | Hen (Little) | | Vinalhaven | Knox | U | | 1 acre (0.40 ha) |
| 65-116 | Hen Cackle | | South Bristol | Lincoln | R | | |
| 59-560 | Henry's | | Brooksville | Hancock | R | | |
| 59-559 | Henry's | | Brooksville | Hancock | R | | |
| 73-300 | Hermit Island Ledge | Breakwater Point | Phippsburg | Sagadahoc | U | | 1.5 acres (0.61 ha) |
| 59-480 | Heron | | Swan's Island | Hancock | E | Owned by Acadia National Park, US Dept. of Interior, nesting ground for eider duck | |
| 73-315 | Heron | | Phippsburg | Sagadahoc | R | | |
| 59-069 | Heron | | Winter Harbor | Hancock | R | Uninhabited, rocky and treeless, Acadia National Park, closed to visitors April 1 -July 31 to protect nesting birds | 6.6 acres (2.7 ha) |
| 73-316 | Heron | | Phippsburg | Sagadahoc | R | | |
| 73-313 | Heron | | Phippsburg | Sagadahoc | R | | |
| 65-261 | Heron (Inner) | | South Bristol | Lincoln | E | Exempt — 4 or more residential structures | |
| 65-279 | Heron (Outer) | | Boothbay | Lincoln | R | | |
| 73-314 | Heron Island Ledge | | Phippsburg | Sagadahoc | U | | 0.5 acres (0.20 ha) |
| 73-312 | Heron Island Ledge | | Phippsburg | Sagadahoc | U | | 0.5 acres (0.20 ha) |
| 65-283 | Heron Island Ledge | | Boothbay | Lincoln | U | | 0.5 acres (0.20 ha) |
| 65-290 | Heron Island Ledge | | South Bristol | Lincoln | U | | 0.5 acres (0.20 ha) |
| 63-162 | Heron Neck Ledges | | Vinalhaven | Knox | U | | 0.5 acres (0.20 ha) |
| 79-686 | Herring Cove Ledge | | Jonesport | Washington | R | | |
| 63-786 | Herring Lodge | | Cushing | Knox | R | | |
| 63-621 | Hewett Island | | State of Maine | Knox | U | | 1 acre (0.40 ha) |
| 63-623 | Hewett Island | | State of Maine | Knox | U | | 0.5 acres (0.20 ha) |
| 63-627 | Hewitt | | State of Maine | Knox | E | Private, some former quarries and lobster ponds, several summer cottages | |
| 79-561 | Hickey | | Roque Bluffs | Washington | R | | |
| 63-569 | High | | St. George | Knox | R | Just north of the mouth of Tenants Harbor. Has a hiking trail and serves as a mating area for great blue herons. Ospreys also nest here. Owned by Maine Coast Heritage Trust, and is open to the public. | 25 acres (10 ha) |
| 63-422 | High | | State of Maine | Knox | R | Private, waterless, uninhabited, granite wharfs left over from quarrying, occasionally used by Outward Bound "solo" campers | |
| 65-129 | High | | South Bristol | Lincoln | R | | |
| 63-933 | High Ledge | | Criehaven Twp. | Knox | T | ME IF&W | 1 acre (0.40 ha) |
| 59-397 | High Sheriff | | Swan's Island | Hancock | T | ME IF&W | 0.5 acres (0.20 ha) |
| 59-087 | Hill's | Hill's Cove | Hancock | Hancock | R | | 9.9 acres (4.0 ha) |
| 65-372 | Hilton's | Kimball | Boothbay | Lincoln | R | | |
| 65-373 | Hilton's Ledge | | Boothbay | Lincoln | R | | |
| 65-377 | Hodgdon | | Boothbay | Lincoln | E | Exempt — 4 or more residential structures | |
| 65-032 | Hoffses | | Waldoboro | Lincoln | R | | |
| 79-830 | Hog | | Steuben | Washington | R | Once owned by notable author E.B. White. | |
| 59-679 | Hog | | State of Maine | Hancock | R | Private, summer cottage | 40 acres (16 ha) |
| 79-759 | Hog | Currant | Harrington | Washington | R | | |
| 59-010 | Hog | Hawthorne | Gouldsboro | Hancock | R | | 52.3 acres (21.2 ha) |
| 79-241 | Hog | | Lubec | Washington | R | | |
| 59-929 | Hog | Naskeag | Brooklin | Hancock | R | | |
| 63-017 | Hog | | North Haven | Knox | R | | |
| 65-165 | Hog | | Bremen | Lincoln | R | Audubon camp and birding center since 1936, deal in progress to sell to Kieve-Wavus Education Foundation | 300 acres (120 ha) |
| 79-279 | Hog | | Machiasport | Washington | R | | |
| 55-379 | Hog | Diamond Island Ledge, Ft. Georges | Portland | Cumberland | R | | |
| 63-077 | Hog | Hen | Vinalhaven | Knox | R | | |
| 79-394 | Hog | | Machiasport | Washington | R | | |
| 65-019 | Hog | | Damariscotta | Lincoln | R | | |
| 63-589 | Hog (Little) | | Matinicus Isle Plt. | Knox | R | | |
| 63-316 | Hog Cove Ledge | | Rockport | Knox | U | | 0.5 acres (0.20 ha) |
| 59-650 | Holbrook | | Castine | Hancock | R | Now a state park and wildlife sanctuary owned by State of Maine, including a tract on the Brooksville shore | |
| 79-272 | Holly Point | | Cutler | Washington | U | | 0.5 acres (0.20 ha) |
| 65-127 | Holly's | | South Bristol | Lincoln | R | | |
| 63-830 | Hupper | | St. George | Knox | E | Exempt — 4 or more residential structures | |
| 59-200 | Hop | | Gouldsboro | Hancock | R | | |
| 55-442 | Hope | | Chebeague | Cumberland | R | Private, summer cottage | 89 acres (36 ha) |
| 79-393 | Hope | | Roque Bluffs | Washington | R | | |
| 55-061 | Hopkins | | Harpswell | Cumberland | R | | |
| 81-168 | Horn | | Kittery | York | U | | 0.5 acres (0.20 ha) |
| 55-405 | Horse | | Harpswell | Cumberland | R | | |
| 59-770 | Horse Head | | State of Maine | Hancock | R | | |
| 63-541 | Hosmer | | St. George | Knox | R | | |
| 59-554 | Hospital | | Brooksville | Hancock | R | Private, used for summer cottage | |
| 55-381 | House | | Portland | Cumberland | R | Private, open by arrangement seasonally for tours | 31.1 acres (12.6 ha) |
| 63-128 | House Ledge | | Vinalhaven | Knox | R | | |
| 81-176 | Hoyts | | Kittery | York | E | 4 or more residential structures exist on the island. | |
| 59-406 | Hub | | Swan's Island | Hancock | R | | |
| 59-624 | Hub | | Blue Hill | Hancock | R | | |
| 59-913 | Hub | | Deer Isle | Hancock | R | | |
| 59-407 | Hub | | Swan's Island | Hancock | R | | |
| 59-217 | Hub (The) | | Mount Desert | Hancock | R | | |
| 65-365 | Hubbard | | Westport Island | Lincoln | R | | |
| 79-158 | Huckins | Solomons | Lubec | Washington | R | | |
| 79-148 | Huckins Ledge | Clam Bar | Lubec | Washington | R | | |
| 79-149 | Huckins Ledge | | Lubec | Washington | U | | 0.5 acres (0.20 ha) |
| 65-016 | Huckleberry | | Newcastle | Lincoln | R | | |
| 59-845 | Huckleberry | | Deer Isle | Hancock | R | | |
| 63-096 | Huckleberry | | Vinalhaven | Knox | R | | |
| 59-590 | Huckleberry | | Brooksville | Hancock | R | | |
| 63-067 | Hughes | | Vinalhaven | Knox | R | | |
| 59-862 | Humpkins | | Stonington | Hancock | U | | 0.5 acres (0.20 ha) |
| 65-083 | Hungry | Hall | Friendship | Knox | R | Extensive community in the 19th century, now largely empty, privately owned | 160 acres (65 ha) |
| 65-463 | Hunting | | Southport | Lincoln | R | | |
| 63-528 | Hurricane | | Vinalhaven | Knox | R | Private, history of extensive quarrying, now leased to the Hurricane Island Foundation | |
| 63-626 | Hurricane (Little) | | State of Maine | Knox | R | Private, owned by lobsterman for fishing rights, and out-of-state vacationers | 1 acre (0.40 ha) |
| 63-518 | Hurricane (Little) | | Vinalhaven | Knox | R | | |
| 63-526 | Hurricane Ledges (South) | | Vinalhaven | Knox | T | ME IF&W | 1.5 acres (0.61 ha) |
| 63-525 | Hurricane Ledges (South) | | Vinalhaven | Knox | T | ME IF&W | 0.5 acres (0.20 ha) |
| 63-524 | Hurricane Ledges (South) | | Vinalhaven | Knox | T | ME IF&W | 1 acre (0.40 ha) |
| 63-523 | Hurricane Ledges (South) | | Vinalhaven | Knox | T | ME IF&W | 1 acre (0.40 ha) |
| 63-527 | Hurricane Ledges (South) | | Vinalhaven | Knox | T | ME IF&W | 0.5 acres (0.20 ha) |
| 77-022 | Hutchins | Coombs Field | Islesboro | Waldo | R | Private, uninhabited, limited public access | |
| 65-273 | Hypocrites Ledges | | Boothbay | Lincoln | R | | |
| 65-275 | Hypocrites Ledges | | Boothbay | Lincoln | R | | |
| 65-277 | Hypocrites Ledges | | Boothbay | Lincoln | R | | |
| 65-272 | Hypocrites Ledges | | Boothbay | Lincoln | R | | |
| 63-716 | Ile D'amour | | Friendship | Knox | R | | |
| 63-319 | Indian | | Rockport | Knox | R | | |
| 63-318 | Indian | | Rockport | Knox | R | Home to Indian Island Light | |
| 55-236 | Indian | | Freeport | Cumberland | R | | |
| 65-183 | Indian | | Bristol | Lincoln | R | | |
| 79-287 | Indian Head | | Machiasport | Washington | U | | 0.5 acres (0.20 ha) |
| 59-127 | Indian Point Ledge | | Bar Harbor | Hancock | T | ME IF&W | 0.4 acres (0.16 ha) |
| 55-481 | Indian Rock | | Portland | Cumberland | T | Maine Bureau of Parks & Lands | 0.5 acres (0.20 ha) |
| 79-450 | Indian Rock | | Jonesport | Washington | U | | 0.5 acres (0.20 ha) |
| 79-429 | Indian Rock | | Addison | Washington | U | | 0.5 acres (0.20 ha) |
| 79-451 | Indian Rock | | Addison | Washington | U | | 0.5 acres (0.20 ha) |
| 79-425 | Indian Rock | | Jonesport | Washington | U | | 0.5 acres (0.20 ha) |
| 79-428 | Indian Rock | | Jonesport | Washington | U | | 0.5 acres (0.20 ha) |
| 65-409 | Indian Town | | Boothbay Harbor | Lincoln | R | | |
| 59-189 | Ingall's | | Sorrento | Hancock | R | | |
| 79-550 | Ingalls | | Machiasport | Washington | E | Exempt — 4 or more residential structures | |
| 59-851 | Inner Harbor | | Stonington | Hancock | U | | 0.5 acres (0.20 ha) |
| 55-087 | Iron (Little) | | Brunswick | Cumberland | R | | |
| 55-101 | Iron (Little) | | Harpswell | Cumberland | R | | |
| 59-182 | Ironbound | | Winter Harbor | Hancock | R | Private, owned by a single family of summer rusticators who often invited artists including John Singer Sargent, now largely protected under conservation easement | | 831 acres (336 ha) |
| 55-264 | Irony | | Harpswell | Cumberland | R | One of the three islands comprising The Goslings. | |
| 63-230 | Isle au Haut | | Isle au Haut | Knox | E | Inhabited year round, fishermen and lobstermen, much of the island is Acadia National Park forested area with trails, campground open seasonally, no dogs allowed | 6,325 acres (2,560 ha) |
| 65-408 | Isle of Springs | | Boothbay Harbor | Lincoln | R | | |
| 77-012 | Isleboro | | Islesboro | Waldo | E | Private, with a state park on one island, 600 year round inhabitants, large seasonal summer colony since the 19th century | |
| 59-676 | Islet Of Pond | | Deer Isle | Hancock | R | | |
| 59-743 | Ivy | | Brooklin | Hancock | U | | 0.5 acres (0.20 ha) |
| 55-602 | Jacquish Ledge | | Harpswell | Cumberland | U | | 0.5 acres (0.20 ha) |
| 55-432 | Jaquish | | Harpswell | Cumberland | R | | |
| 55-430 | Jaquish Ledge | | Harpswell | Cumberland | R | | |
| 55-429 | Jaquish Ledge | | Harpswell | Cumberland | R | | |
| 55-434 | Jaquish Ledge | | Harpswell | Cumberland | R | | |
| 55-431 | Jaquish Ledge | | Harpswell | Cumberland | R | | |
| 59-136 | Jed | | Blue Hill | Hancock | R | Includes "My Island", a 1.5-acre islet accessible at low tide. Once named Seal Island, likely due to the abundance of harbor seals in the surrounding harbor.While open to the public, the northern half of the island is home to bald eagles to nest, and so is closed during their mating season. | 13.6 acres (5.5 ha) |
| 59-140 | Jed | | Blue Hill | Hancock | R | | |
| 63-070 | Jennings | | Vinalhaven | Knox | R | | |
| 55-159 | Jenny | | Harpswell | Cumberland | T | ME IF&W | 3.5 acres (1.4 ha) |
| 73-173 | Jenny's Nubble | | West Bath | Sagadahoc | R | | |
| 79-420 | Jerden's | | Addison | Washington | R | | |
| 59-031 | Jetteau Point Of Land | | Gouldsboro | Hancock | R | | |
| 55-480 | Jewell | | Portland | Cumberland | E | Exempt - Parks and Recreation | |
| 55-479 | Jewell (Little) | | Chebeague Island | Cumberland | U | | 1 acre (0.40 ha) |
| 65-177 | Jim Island Ledge | | Bremen | Lincoln | U | | 0.5 acres (0.20 ha) |
| 81-198 | Jimmies Ledge | | Kittery | York | R | | |
| 79-939 | Jim's | | Milbridge | Washington | R | | |
| 65-179 | Jim's | Calf | Bremen | Lincoln | R | | |
| 59-935 | Jim's | | Deer Isle | Hancock | R | | |
| 77-074 | Job | | Islesboro | Waldo | R | Private, uninhabited, farmed land returning to natural state | |
| 63-344 | Jobbies | | North Haven | Knox | R | | |
| 59-912 | Joe's Ledge | | Deer Isle | Hancock | R | | |
| 77-049 | Joe's Rock | | Islesboro | Waldo | R | | |
| 59-483 | John | | Swan's Island | Hancock | R | | |
| 55-274 | John (Little) | | Yarmouth | Cumberland | E | Exempt — 4 or more residential structures | |
| 73-220 | John Ed's | | Georgetown | Sagadahoc | R | | |
| 79-443 | John White | | Addison | Washington | R | | |
| 59-622 | John's | | Blue Hill | Hancock | R | | |
| 59-623 | John's | | Blue Hill | Hancock | R | | |
| 59-351 | John's | | Swan's Island | Hancock | R | Private, summer cottages | |
| 59-229 | John's | | Mount Desert | Hancock | R | | |
| 59-631 | John's | | Blue Hill | Hancock | R | | |
| 59-434 | John's | | Tremont | Hancock | R | | |
| 59-884 | John's | | Stonington | Hancock | R | Private, uninhabited | |
| 65-229 | John's | | Bristol | Lincoln | R | | |
| 59-231 | John's | | Mount Desert | Hancock | U | | 1 acre (0.40 ha) |
| 65-289 | John's (Little) | | Boothbay | Lincoln | R | | |
| 59-484 | John's Dry Ledge | | Swan's Island | Hancock | T | ME IF&W | 0.5 acres (0.20 ha) |
| 65-034 | Johnson | | Waldoboro | Lincoln | R | | |
| 65-188 | Jones Garden | | Bristol | Lincoln | T | ME IF&W | 3 acres (1.2 ha) |
| 65-187 | Jones Ledge | | Bristol | Lincoln | T | ME IF&W | 0.5 acres (0.20 ha) |
| 79-837 | Jonny's | Fish | Steuben | Washington | R | | |
| 59-012 | Jordan | | Winter Harbor | Hancock | R | | 261.5 acres (105.8 ha) |
| 79-922 | Jordans Delight | | Milbridge | Washington | R | | |
| 59-173 | Junk of Pork | | Sorrento | Hancock | R | | |
| 55-486 | Junk of Pork | | Long Island | Cumberland | T | ME IF&W | 1.5 acres (0.61 ha) |
| 59-691 | Keeler | | Brooksville | Hancock | R | | |
| 79-784 | Kemps Folly | | Milbridge | Washington | R | | |
| 59-855 | Kiah's | | Stonington | Hancock | R | | |
| 65-189 | Killickstone | | Bristol | Lincoln | T | ME IF&W | 0.5 acres (0.20 ha) |
| 63-221 | Kimball | | Isle au Haut | Knox | R | Private, summer cottages | |
| 63-219 | Kimball Ledge | | Isle au Haut | Knox | U | | 0.5 acres (0.20 ha) |
| 65-469 | Kitten | | Southport | Lincoln | R | | |
| 79-669 | Knight | | Jonesport | Washington | R | | |
| 65-227 | Knowle's Rocks | | Bristol | Lincoln | U | | 0.5 acres (0.20 ha) |
| 65-228 | Knowle's Rocks | | Bristol | Lincoln | U | | 0.5 acres (0.20 ha) |
| 65-226 | Knowle's Rocks | | Bristol | Lincoln | U | | 0.5 acres (0.20 ha) |
| 65-225 | Knowle's Rocks | | Bristol | Lincoln | U | | 0.5 acres (0.20 ha) |
| 65-230 | Knowle's Rocks | | Bristol | Lincoln | U | | 0.5 acres (0.20 ha) |
| 73-231 | Knubble | | Georgetown | Sagadahoc | R | | |
| 63-516 | L. Hurricane Ledge | | Vinalhaven | Knox | T | ME IF&W | 1 acre (0.40 ha) |
| 63-517 | L. Hurricane Ledge | | Vinalhaven | Knox | U | | 1 acre (0.40 ha) |
| 79-632 | Ladle | | Addison | Washington | R | | |
| 79-634 | Ladle Ledge (West) | | Addison | Washington | U | | 0.5 acres (0.20 ha) |
| 63-491 | Lairey's | Lawry's | Vinalhaven | Knox | R | | |
| 63-506 | Laireys Ledge | | Vinalhaven | Knox | U | | 0.5 acres (0.20 ha) |
| 79-569 | Lakeman | | Jonesport | Washington | R | | |
| 73-188 | Lamb | | Georgetown | Sagadahoc | R | | |
| 73-189 | Lamb Ledge | | Georgetown | Sagadahoc | U | | 0.5 acres (0.20 ha) |
| 63-115 | Lamont (Middle) | | Vinalhaven | Knox | R | | |
| 63-117 | Lamont (Middle) | | Vinalhaven | Knox | R | | |
| 63-114 | Lamont (North) | | Vinalhaven | Knox | R | | |
| 63-116 | Lamont (North) | | Vinalhaven | Knox | R | | |
| 63-119 | Lamont (South) | | Vinalhaven | Knox | R | | |
| 63-118 | Lamont (South) | | Vinalhaven | Knox | R | | |
| 59-346 | Lamp | | Frenchboro | Hancock | R | | |
| 63-149 | Lane | Lane's | Vinalhaven | Knox | E | Private, under Nature Conservancy easement and serves as a park; a few homes on northern third | 45 acres (18 ha) |
| 55-200 | Lanes | | Yarmouth | Cumberland | R | Sandy beaches, fringing salt marshes, and steep embankments. The island is accessible by boat at mid-to-high tides. Two campsites exist on the island. The island was once used by the Abenaki people and letter European settlers. Owned by the Maine Coast Heritage Trust. Open to the public. | 28.2 acres (11.4 ha) |
| 63-331 | Lasell | | North Haven | Knox | R | Private, summer cottage | |
| 63-332 | Lassel Island Ledge | | North Haven | Knox | U | | 0.5 acres (0.20 ha) |
| 63-492 | Lawry's (Little) | | Vinalhaven | Knox | R | Private, summer rusticators. Excellent spring said to be the only natural fresh water in White Islands group. | |
| 59-952 | Lazy Gut | | Deer Isle | Hancock | R | Private, summer cottage built on gut | |
| 59-951 | Lazy Gut (Westerly) | | Deer Isle | Hancock | R | | |
| 63-529 | Leadbetter | | Vinalhaven | Knox | R | Private, elegant large pre-1840 two-story Leadbetter house still in use | |
| 63-475 | Leadbetter | | Vinalhaven | Knox | R | | |
| 55-076 | Leavitt | | Harpswell | Cumberland | R | | |
| 63-767 | Ledge | | Friendship | Knox | R | | |
| 55-155 | Ledge | | Harpswell | Cumberland | R | | |
| 55-143 | Ledge | | Harpswell | Cumberland | R | | |
| 63-766 | Ledge | | Friendship | Knox | R | | |
| 55-141 | Ledge | | Harpswell | Cumberland | R | | |
| 55-140 | Ledge | | Harpswell | Cumberland | R | | |
| 73-259 | Ledge | White Rocks | Georgetown | Sagadahoc | R | | |
| 55-139 | Ledge | | Harpswell | Cumberland | R | | |
| 55-138 | Ledge | | Harpswell | Cumberland | R | | |
| 59-021 | Ledge | Sargeant | Winter Harbor | Hancock | R | | |
| 55-133 | Ledge | | Harpswell | Cumberland | R | | |
| 55-142 | Ledge | | Harpswell | Cumberland | R | | |
| 63-152 | Ledge | | Vinalhaven | Knox | R | | |
| 63-021 | Ledge | | North Haven | Knox | R | | |
| 59-377 | Ledge | | Swan's Island | Hancock | U | | 0.5 acres (0.20 ha) |
| 59-022 | Ledge Off Sargent | | Winter Harbor | Hancock | R | | |
| 59-452 | Ledges (The) | | Tremont | Hancock | R | | |
| 59-227 | Ledges (The) | | Mount Desert | Hancock | R | | |
| 73-168 | Lee | | Phippsburg | Sagadahoc | R | | |
| 59-655 | Legerdemain | | Brooksville | Hancock | R | | |
| 65-017 | Lehman | | Newcastle | Lincoln | R | | |
| 79-792 | Lenroy | | Milbridge | Washington | R | | |
| 79-360 | Libby | | Machiasport | Washington | E | Exempt - Dept. of Interior; home to Libby Island Light | |
| 79-359 | Libby (Big) | | Machiasport | Washington | R | | |
| 81-060 | Libby's Point | | Kennebunk | York | R | | |
| 81-019 | Libbyshears | | Biddeford | York | U | | 0.5 acres (0.20 ha) |
| 79-033 | Liberty Point | | Robbinston | Washington | R | | |
| 77-078 | Lime | | Islesboro | Waldo | R | Private, occasionally visited by Outward Bound soloists | |
| 73-062 | Lines | | Woolwich | Sagadahoc | R | | |
| 73-097 | Lines (Little) | | Woolwich | Sagadahoc | R | | |
| 63-019 | Little | | North Haven | Knox | R | | |
| 73-193 | Little | | Georgetown | Sagadahoc | R | | |
| 59-827 | Little | | Stonington | Hancock | R | | |
| 55-074 | Little | Shepard | Harpswell | Cumberland | R | | |
| 59-082 | Little | | Franklin | Hancock | R | | |
| 59-083 | Little | | Franklin | Hancock | R | | |
| 73-187 | Little | The Basin | Phippsburg | Sagadahoc | R | | 2 acres (0.81 ha) |
| 59-755 | Little | | Brooklin | Hancock | R | Private, largely unused | |
| 59-272 | Little | | Southwest Harbor | Hancock | R | | |
| 63-401 | Little | | Owls Head | Knox | R | | |
| 73-174 | Little | | Phippsburg | Sagadahoc | R | | |
| 65-300 | Little | | Bristol | Lincoln | R | | |
| 65-425 | Little | | Southport | Lincoln | R | | |
| 63-770 | Little | Little Joe's | Friendship | Knox | R | | |
| 65-243 | Little | | South Bristol | Lincoln | R | | |
| 73-181 | Little | | Georgetown | Sagadahoc | R | | |
| 65-120 | Little | | Bristol | Lincoln | R | | |
| 77-039 | Little | | Islesboro | Waldo | R | | |
| 63-741 | Little | Little Morse | Friendship | Knox | R | | |
| 79-821 | Little | | Milbridge | Washington | R | | |
| 81-153 | Little | | Kittery | York | R | | |
| 63-576 | Little | | St. George | Knox | R | | |
| 65-182 | Little | | Bristol | Lincoln | R | | |
| 65-035 | Little | | Bremen | Lincoln | R | | |
| 65-426 | Little | | Southport | Lincoln | R | | |
| 65-218 | Little | | Boothbay | Lincoln | R | | |
| 63-907 | Little | | Matinicus Isle Plt. | Knox | R | | |
| 63-751 | Little | | Cushing | Knox | R | | |
| 55-210 | Little #1 | | Yarmouth | Cumberland | R | | |
| 55-209 | Little #2 | | Yarmouth | Cumberland | R | | |
| 63-076 | Little (The) | | Vinalhaven | Knox | R | | |
| 59-895 | Little Georges Head | | Stonington | Hancock | R | | |
| 65-109 | Little Huckleberry | Pleasant Cove, Huckle | Boothbay | Lincoln | R | | |
| 79-842 | Little Ledge | | Steuben | Washington | U | | 0.5 acres (0.20 ha) |
| 79-076 | Little Point | | Pembroke | Washington | R | | |
| 79-187 | Little's | | Edmunds Twp. | Washington | R | | |
| 59-030 | Lobster | | Gouldsboro | Hancock | R | | |
| 65-062 | Locust | | Waldoboro | Lincoln | R | | |
| 65-061 | Locust Island Ledge | | Waldoboro | Lincoln | U | | 0.5 acres (0.20 ha) |
| 65-363 | Lone Pine | | Boothbay | Lincoln | R | | |
| 55-332 | Long | | Long Island | Cumberland | E | Exempt — 4 or more residential structures | |
| 59-451 | Long | | Frenchboro | Hancock | E | Year-round population. Most of the island's interior and its coast protected under easement with hiking trails maintained by Maine Coast Heritage Trust. Passenger ferry service, every other Wednesday round trip ferry provided with a 4-hour layover. Seasonal restaurant, no emergency services. | |
| 55-045 | Long | | Harpswell | Cumberland | E | 4 or more residential structures | |
| 73-194 | Long | | Georgetown | Sagadahoc | E | Exempt — 4 or more residential structures | |
| 59-637 | Long | | Blue Hill | Hancock | E | Exempt - 4 or more structures | |
| 79-242 | Long | | Lubec | Washington | R | | |
| 55-334 | Long | | Long Island | Cumberland | U | | 0.5 acres (0.20 ha) |
| 59-847 | Long Cove | | Deer Isle | Hancock | U | | 0.5 acres (0.20 ha) |
| 59-241 | Long Hub | | Blue Hill | Hancock | R | | |
| 59-175 | Long Ledge | | Sorrento | Hancock | R | | |
| 59-353 | Long Ledge | | Swan's Island | Hancock | T | ME IF&W | 0.5 acres (0.20 ha) |
| 55-175 | Long Ledge | | Harpswell | Cumberland | T | ME IF&W | 1.3 acres (0.53 ha) |
| 63-774 | Long Ledge | | Friendship | Knox | T | ME IF&W | 2 acres (0.81 ha) |
| 59-271 | Long Ledge | | Cranberry Isles | Hancock | U | | 0.5 acres (0.20 ha) |
| 59-431 | Long Ledge | | Southwest Harbor | Hancock | U | | 0.5 acres (0.20 ha) |
| 55-176 | Long Ledge (South) | | Harpswell | Cumberland | T | ME IF&W | 2 acres (0.81 ha) |
| 55-157 | Long Point | | Harpswell | Cumberland | R | | |
| 59-201 | Long Porcupine | | Gouldsboro | Hancock | R | Donated to Nature Conservancy in 1977, managed by Acadia National Park, closed to visitors February 15-August 15 to avoid disturbing eagle nesting | |
| 73-211 | Long Tree | | Georgetown | Sagadahoc | R | | |
| 55-113 | Lookout Point | | Harpswell | Cumberland | U | | |
| 55-114 | Lookout Point | | Harpswell | Cumberland | U | | |
| 79-768 | Lord's | | Harrington | Washington | R | | |
| 65-185 | Louds | Muscungus | Unorganized territory | Lincoln | E | Once a thriving community, reduced to a summer island in the 1960s | |
| 65-184 | Louds Island Ledge | | Bristol | Lincoln | U | | 0.5 acres (0.20 ha) |
| 63-320 | Lowell Rock | | Rockport | Knox | U | | 0.5 acres (0.20 ha) |
| 65-462 | Lower Mark | | Southport | Lincoln | U | | 0.5 acres (0.20 ha) |
| 79-367 | Machias Seal | | | Washington | T | ME IF&W & Canadian Coast Guard in dispute | 20 acres (8.1 ha) |
| 63-904 | Mackerel Ledge | | Matinicus Isle Plt. | Knox | U | | 0.5 acres (0.20 ha) |
| 55-357 | Mackworth | | Falmouth | Cumberland | E | Connected by causeway to mainland; public park, School for the Deaf | 100 acres (40 ha) |
| 73-232 | Macmahon | | Georgetown | Sagadahoc | E | Exempt — 4 or more residential structures | |
| 55-043 | Macpherson | | Harpswell | Cumberland | R | | |
| 59-933 | Mahoney | | Brooklin | Hancock | R | Private, unused, "the stench [from nesting seabirds] is strong enough today to keep fastidious mariners upwind." | |
| 79-120 | Major's | | Lubec | Washington | R | | |
| 79-920 | Majors Head | | Milbridge | Washington | R | | |
| 81-193 | Malaga | | Kittery | York | R | | |
| 73-144 | Malaga | | Phippsburg | Sagadahoc | R | Once home to a mixed-race fishing community, the residents were forcibly removed by the state in 1912. The island's history is now commemorated, with the preserve offering a loop trail and informational markers. Most of the island is covered by maritime spruce-fir forest, with a brackish pond and salt marsh on the southern end. Owned by Maine Coast Heritage Trust. Island is open to the public. | 320 acres (130 ha) |
| 73-149 | Malaga Island Ledge | | Phippsburg | Sagadahoc | U | | 0.5 acres (0.20 ha) |
| 73-141 | Malaga Island Ledge | | Phippsburg | Sagadahoc | U | | 0.5 acres (0.20 ha) |
| 73-195 | Malaga Island Ledge | | Phippsburg | Sagadahoc | U | | 0.5 acres (0.20 ha) |
| 73-197 | Malaga Island Ledge | | Phippsburg | Sagadahoc | U | | 0.5 acres (0.20 ha) |
| 73-148 | Malaga Island Ledge | | Phippsburg | Sagadahoc | U | | 1 acre (0.40 ha) |
| 73-147 | Malaga Island Ledge | | Phippsburg | Sagadahoc | U | | 1.5 acres (0.61 ha) |
| 73-196 | Malaga Island Ledge | | Phippsburg | Sagadahoc | U | | 0.5 acres (0.20 ha) |
| 63-938 | Malcolm Ledge | | Matinicus Isle Plt. | Knox | U | | 0.5 acres (0.20 ha) |
| 79-655 | Man | | Jonesport | Washington | R | | |
| 79-654 | Man (Inner) | | Jonesport | Washington | R | | |
| 65-323 | Manana | | Monhegan Island Plt. | Lincoln | R | Site of a former Coast Guard fog signal station. Has 0 inhabitants. | |
| 79-695 | Mannings Farm | | Beals | Washington | T | ME IF&W | 0.5 acres (0.20 ha) |
| 63-403 | Marblehead | | Muscle Ridge Shoals Twp. | Knox | T | ME IF&W | 1 acre (0.40 ha) |
| 59-067 | Mark | | Winter Harbor | Hancock | R | Private, waterless, barred to Ned Island; home to the discontinued Winter Harbor Lighthouse | |
| 63-339 | Mark | | North Haven | Knox | R | Private, natural area, owned by Nature Conservancy since 1,969 acres (797 ha) | |
| 59-835 | Mark | | Stonington | Hancock | R | Private, once inhabited by keeper of the Deer Island Thorofare Lighthouse | |
| 79-493 | Mark | | Jonesport | Washington | R | | |
| 59-956 | Mark (Eastern) | | Stonington | Hancock | R | | |
| 55-426 | Mark (Great) | Mark (Inner) | Harpswell | Cumberland | R | | |
| 55-437 | Mark (Little) | | Harpswell | Cumberland | T | ME IF&W. Home to Little Mark Monument Light, an unadorned 74-foot (23 m) stone obelisk light tower built 1,827 acres (739 ha) | 1.7 acres (0.69 ha) |
| 79-463 | Mark (Little) | | Roque Bluffs | Washington | U | | 0.5 acres (0.20 ha) |
| 65-461 | Mark (Lower) | | Southport | Lincoln | R | | |
| 55-630 | Mark (Outer) | Mark | Harpswell | Cumberland | R | | 10.5 acres (4.2 ha) |
| 63-260 | Mark (South) | | Isle au Haut | Knox | T | ME IF&W | 9 acres (3.6 ha) |
| 65-400 | Mark (Upper) | | Westport Island | Lincoln | R | | |
| 73-233 | Mark Ledge | | Georgetown | Sagadahoc | T | ME IF&W | 0.5 acres (0.20 ha) |
| 73-190 | Marr | | Georgetown | Sagadahoc | R | | |
| 79-171 | Marscot | | Edmunds Twp. | Washington | R | | |
| 79-567 | Marsh | | Jonesport | Washington | R | | |
| 79-629 | Marsh | | Addison | Washington | R | | |
| 79-456 | Marsh | | Addison | Washington | R | | |
| 65-190 | Marsh | | Bristol | Lincoln | R | | |
| 65-040 | Marsh | | Waldoboro | Lincoln | R | | 0 acres (0 ha) |
| 63-220 | Marsh Cove Ledge | | Isle au Haut | Knox | U | | 0.5 acres (0.20 ha) |
| 79-442 | Marsh Harbor | | Addison | Washington | R | | |
| 59-470 | Marshall (Little) | Ringtown | Unorganized territory | Hancock | R | | |
| 59-981 | Marshall | | Unorganized territory | Hancock | R | Maine Coast Heritage Trust acquired this island for conservation and public use in 2003. | 960 acres (390 ha) |
| 79-656 | Mash | | Jonesport | Washington | R | | |
| 59-481 | Mason Ledge | | Swan's Island | Hancock | T | ME IF&W | 6 acres (2.4 ha) |
| 55-027 | Mason Rock | | Brunswick | Cumberland | R | | |
| 55-111 | Mathis | Marthas, Matthews | Harpswell | Cumberland | R | | |
| 63-903 | Matinicus | | Matinicus Isle Plt. | Knox | E | Private, 50 year-round residents, three to four times that in summer Occasional tensions between year-round islanders and summer rusticators, and between lobstermen over traditional "ground rights." | 1,024 acres (414 ha) |
| 63-940 | Matinicus Rock | | Matinicus Isle Plt. | Knox | E | Exempt - Dept. of Interior. Home to renowned Matinicus Rock Light, one of the most remote in the U.S. | |
| 79-128 | Matthews | | Eastport | Washington | R | | |
| 59-967 | McGlathery | | Stonington | Hancock | R | | |
| 59-968 | McGlathery (Little) | | Stonington | Hancock | R | | |
| 63-496 | Medrick Rock | | Vinalhaven | Knox | T | ME IF&W | 0.5 acres (0.20 ha) |
| 63-805 | Megee | | St. George | Knox | R | | |
| 65-123 | Menigawum | | South Bristol | Lincoln | R | | |
| 63-212 | Merchant's | | Isle au Haut | Knox | R | Private, summer cottages | |
| 73-176 | Mercury | | Phippsburg | Sagadahoc | U | | 0.5 acres (0.20 ha) |
| 65-102 | Mercy | | Edgecomb | Lincoln | R | | |
| 73-160 | Merritt | | West Bath | Sagadahoc | R | | |
| 65-374 | Merrow | | Boothbay | Lincoln | R | | |
| 63-584 | Metinic | | State of Maine | Knox | E | U.S. Fish and Wildlife Service established bird sanctuary on half the island after forcing out local owner. | 330 acres (130 ha) |
| 77-073 | Middle | | Islesboro | Waldo | R | | |
| 63-167 | Middle Ledge | | Vinalhaven | Knox | U | | 0.5 acres (0.20 ha) |
| 73-234 | Middle Mark | | Georgetown | Sagadahoc | T | ME IF&W | 0.5 acres (0.20 ha) |
| 73-235 | Middle Mark | | Georgetown | Sagadahoc | T | ME IF&W | 0.5 acres (0.20 ha) |
| 65-355 | Miles | Lewis | Boothbay | Lincoln | R | | |
| 81-108 | Milk | | Kennebunkport | York | R | | |
| 59-638 | Mill | | Blue Hill | Hancock | E | Exempt - 4 or more structures | |
| 59-553 | Mill | Gray's | Brooksville | Hancock | R | Private, no trace remains of 18th-century tidal mill that gave the island its name. | |
| 59-029 | Mill | | Gouldsboro | Hancock | R | | |
| 59-816 | Mill | | Deer Isle | Hancock | R | | |
| 59-402 | Mill Pond | | Swan's Island | Hancock | R | | |
| 59-814 | Mill Pond | | Deer Isle | Hancock | U | | 0.5 acres (0.20 ha) |
| 65-110 | Miller | | South Bristol | Lincoln | R | | |
| 59-971 | Millet | | Stonington | Hancock | R | | |
| 65-103 | Mimsie | | Edgecomb | Lincoln | R | | |
| 81-185 | Mingo | | Kittery | York | R | | |
| 55-424 | Ministerial | | Chebeague Island | Cumberland | R | | |
| 63-646 | Mink | | State of Maine | Knox | R | Private, once densely populated fishing colony with good freshwater well; now uninhabited | |
| 79-679 | Mink | | Beals | Washington | R | | |
| 63-085 | Mink | | Vinalhaven | Knox | R | | |
| 79-345 | Mink | | Cutler | Washington | R | | |
| 73-250 | Mink | | Georgetown | Sagadahoc | R | | |
| 79-486 | Mink | | Jonesport | Washington | R | | |
| 79-156 | Mink | | Lubec | Washington | R | | |
| 79-766 | Mink | | Harrington | Washington | U | | 0.5 acres (0.20 ha) |
| 79-741 | Mink | | Addison | Washington | U | | 0.5 acres (0.20 ha) |
| 79-343 | Mink Island Ledge | | Cutler | Washington | U | | 0.5 acres (0.20 ha) |
| 79-344 | Mink Island Ledge | | Cutler | Washington | U | | 0.5 acres (0.20 ha) |
| 63-435 | Mink Rock | | Muscle Ridge Shoals Twp. | Knox | R | | |
| 55-452 | Mink Rocks | | Chebeague Island | Cumberland | T | ME IF&W | 0.5 acres (0.20 ha) |
| 55-451 | Mink Rocks | | Chebeague Island | Cumberland | T | ME IF&W | 0.5 acres (0.20 ha) |
| 79-364 | Minklet | | Cutler | Washington | R | | |
| 77-071 | Minot | | Islesboro | Waldo | R | Private, considered a "pleasing and sheltered island" by McLane, now summer cottages | |
| 77-072 | Minot Island Ledge | | Islesboro | Waldo | U | | 0.5 acres (0.20 ha) |
| 79-673 | Mistake | | Jonesport | Washington | R | Home to Moose Peak Light | |
| 63-131 | Mitten Ledge | | Vinalhaven | Knox | U | | 0.5 acres (0.20 ha) |
| 79-849 | Money | | Steuben | Washington | R | | |
| 73-059 | Money | | Woolwich | Sagadahoc | R | | |
| 79-659 | Money | | Jonesport | Washington | R | | |
| 65-317 | Monhegan | | Monhegan Island Plt. | Lincoln | E | Summer artists' colony, approx. 40 year-round residents, most of the island interior and coast protected under easement with hiking trails, passenger ferry service, no cars | 640 acres (260 ha) |
| 63-392 | Monroe | | Owls Head | Knox | R | Monroe has freshwater ponds, wetlands, a marsh, and beaches. Some stone walls and fencing remains from a previous owner. Owned by Maine Coast Heritage Trust and is open to the public. | 225 acres (91 ha) |
| 59-112 | Moon Ledge | | Hancock | Hancock | U | | 0.5 acres (0.20 ha) |
| 79-426 | Moose | Crowley | Addison | Washington | E | Exempt — 4 or more residential structures | |
| 79-114 | Moose | | Eastport | Washington | E | Exempt — 4 or more residential structures | |
| 59-237 | Moose | | Tremont | Hancock | R | | |
| 59-831 | Moose | | Stonington | Hancock | R | Connected to Deer Isle by road and causeway, inhabited. Private, uninhabited. | |
| 59-063 | Moose (Little) | | Winter Harbor | Hancock | E | Uninhabited, spruce, balsam fir and jackpines, connected to Schoodic Peninsula at low tide by tidal bar; Acadia National Park | 54.3 acres (22.0 ha) |
| 79-325 | Moose (Little) | | Trescott Twp. | Washington | T | Maine Bureau of Parks & Lands | 1 acre (0.40 ha) |
| 59-830 | Moose Island Ledge | | Stonington | Hancock | T | ME IF&W | 1 acre (0.40 ha) |
| 79-497 | Moose Ledge | | Jonesport | Washington | R | | |
| 79-331 | Moose Ledge (Little) | | Trescott Twp. | Washington | T | Maine Bureau of Parks & Lands | 0.5 acres (0.20 ha) |
| 63-775 | Morse | Carver's | Friendship | Knox | E | Once slated for intensive development, now only sparsely inhabited by summer rusticators | |
| 63-779 | Morse Island Ledge | Horne's Ledge | Friendship | Knox | U | | 0.5 acres (0.20 ha) |
| 63-780 | Morse Island Ledge | Horne's Ledge | Friendship | Knox | U | | 0.5 acres (0.20 ha) |
| 63-777 | Morse Island Ledge | Horne's Ledge | Friendship | Knox | U | | 0.5 acres (0.20 ha) |
| 63-778 | Morse Island Ledge | Horne's Ledge | Friendship | Knox | U | | 0.5 acres (0.20 ha) |
| 63-756 | Morse's Little | | Friendship | Knox | R | | |
| 65-115 | Morton's | | South Bristol | Lincoln | R | | |
| 55-261 | Moshier | | Yarmouth | Cumberland | R | | |
| 55-272 | Moshier (Little) | | Yarmouth | Cumberland | R | | |
| 73-099 | Mosquick | | Woolwich | Sagadahoc | R | | |
| 63-577 | Mosquito | | St. George | Knox | R | Privately owned, seasonal habitation (summers only) 200-year-old stone house at northwest corner, quarries supplied granite for lighthouses at Matinicus Rock and Southern Island off Tenants Harbor | |
| 63-074 | Mount Ephraim | | Vinalhaven | Knox | R | | |
| 65-427 | Mouse | | Southport | Lincoln | E | Exempt — 4 or more residential structures | |
| 63-330 | Mouse | | North Haven | Knox | R | | |
| 63-311 | Mouse | | Camden | Knox | R | | |
| 63-262 | Mouse | | Isle au Haut | Knox | R | | |
| 63-214 | Mouse | | Isle au Haut | Knox | R | | |
| 63-060 | Mouse | | Vinalhaven | Knox | R | | |
| 79-418 | Mouse | | Jonesport | Washington | R | | |
| 63-482 | Mouse | | Vinalhaven | Knox | R | | |
| 63-444 | Mouse | | Muscle Ridge Shoals Twp. | Knox | R | | |
| 79-528 | Mouse | | Beals | Washington | R | | |
| 55-053 | Mouse | Little Snow | Harpswell | Cumberland | U | | 2 acres (0.81 ha) |
| 81-034 | Mouse | | Biddeford | York | U | | 1 acre (0.40 ha) |
| 63-222 | Moxie | | Isle au Haut | Knox | R | | |
| 59-119 | Mount Desert | | Bar Harbor, Mount Desert, Southwest Harbor & Tremont | Hancock | E | Largest Maine island, inhabited year-round, connected to mainland by bridges, Acadia National Park occupies about half of the island, famous as summer resort. | 69,120 acres (27,970 ha) |
| 59-561 | Mount Desert Rock | | | Hancock | E | Exempt - Dept. of Interior.; Home to Mount Desert Rock Light, the most isolated lighthouse in the U.S. | |
| 63-022 | Mullen Cove | | North Haven | Knox | R | | |
| 63-020 | Mullens (Little) | | North Haven | Knox | R | | |
| 63-010 | Mullens Creek Ledges | | North Haven | Knox | R | | |
| 59-126 | Muriel | | Bar Harbor | Hancock | R | | |
| 73-032 | Mustard's | | Topsham | Sagadahoc | R | | |
| 59-597 | Nab | | Brooksville | Hancock | R | | |
| 61-002 | Nahamkeag | | Gardiner | Kennebec | R | | |
| 79-755 | Narrows | | Harrington | Washington | R | | |
| 63-132 | Narrow's | | Vinalhaven | Knox | R | Used in the 20th century for sheepherding, not inhabited, private | |
| 63-138 | Narrows Island Ledge | | Vinalhaven | Knox | U | | 1 acre (0.40 ha) |
| 79-627 | Nash | | Addison | Washington | R | Home to Nash Island Light | |
| 79-626 | Nash (Large) | | Addison | Washington | R | | |
| 63-213 | Nathan's | | Isle au Haut | Knox | R | Private | 10 acres (4.0 ha) |
| 59-556 | Nautilus | Wilson | Brooksville | Hancock | R | Private | 37 acres (15 ha) |
| 63-081 | Neck | | Vinalhaven | Knox | R | | |
| 63-476 | Neck | | Vinalhaven | Knox | R | | |
| 73-279 | Neck (Little) | | Phippsburg | Sagadahoc | R | | |
| 59-066 | Ned | | Winter Harbor | Hancock | R | | |
| 65-269 | Negro | | Boothbay | Lincoln | E | Exempt — 4 or more residential structures | |
| 81-014 | Negro | | Biddeford | York | R | | |
| 81-094 | Negro | | Kennebunkport | York | R | | |
| 59-552 | Negro (Lower) | | Castine | Hancock | R | | |
| 59-551 | Negro (Upper) | | Castine | Hancock | R | | |
| 63-622 | Nettle | | Muscle Ridge Shoals Twp. | Knox | R | | |
| 65-302 | New Harbor Dry Ledge | | Bristol | Lincoln | T | ME IF&W | 0.5 acres (0.20 ha) |
| 65-301 | New Harbor Dry Ledge | | Bristol | Lincoln | T | ME IF&W | 2 acres (0.81 ha) |
| 79-098 | Nickerson | | Pembroke | Washington | R | | |
| 73-090 | Kicken | | Arrowsic | Sagadahoc | R | | |
| 59-889 | Sprout | | Stonington | Hancock | R | | |
| 73-089 | Stevens Ledge | | Arrowsic | Sagadahoc | R | | |
| 79-748 | Nightcap | | Addison | Washington | R | | |
| 79-133 | Nipps | | Perry | Washington | R | | |
| 59-977 | No Mans | | Stonington | Hancock | U | | 5 acres (2.0 ha) |
| 63-900 | No Man's Land | | Matinicus Isle Plt. | Knox | R | Private owner, uninhabited because the state of Maine prohibited constructing a cottage to avoid disturbing nesting eider ducks | |
| 59-016 | Norris | | Winter Harbor | Hancock | R | | |
| 63-080 | North Haven | | North Haven | Knox | E | Private, wealthy rusticators' summer cottages since the late 19th century | 7,040 acres (2,850 ha) |
| 59-361 | North Point Ledge | | Swan's Island | Hancock | U | | 0.5 acres (0.20 ha) |
| 79-366 | North Rock | | | Washington | T | ME IF&W | |
| 63-570 | Northern | | St. George | Knox | R | | |
| 79-753 | Norton | | Addison | Washington | R | Private, large seasonal house | 60 acres (24 ha) |
| 79-453 | Norton | | Beals | Washington | R | | |
| 79-403 | Norton | | Beals | Washington | R | | |
| 79-402 | Norton | | Beals | Washington | R | | |
| 63-550 | Norton | | St. George | Knox | R | Connected by tidal bar to Whitehead, trees cut for pulp in the 1920s, uninhabited | |
| 63-555 | Norton Island Ledge | | St. George | Knox | U | | 0.5 acres (0.20 ha) |
| 79-900 | Norton Island Ledge | | Addison | Washington | U | | 1 acre (0.40 ha) |
| 79-405 | Norton Ledges | Norton Island Reef | Beals | Washington | T | ME IF&W | 1 acre (0.40 ha) |
| 79-941 | Norton Reef | | Addison | Washington | R | | |
| 59-635 | Nub | | Blue Hill | Hancock | R | | |
| 59-636 | Nub | | Blue Hill | Hancock | R | | |
| 59-998 | Nubbin | | Deer Isle | Hancock | R | | |
| 59-706 | Nubbin | | Deer Isle | Hancock | R | | |
| 55-223 | Nubbin | | Yarmouth | Cumberland | T | ME IF&W | 0.2 acres (0.081 ha) |
| 81-142 | Nubble | | York | York | E | Exempt - Dept. of Interior; home to Cape Neddick Light, a landmark recognized around the world | |
| 79-455 | Nubble | | Addison | Washington | R | | |
| 55-051 | Nubble | | Harpswell | Cumberland | R | | |
| 63-586 | Nubble | | Matinicus Isle Plt. | Knox | R | | |
| 55-323 | Nubble (The) | | Chebeague Island | Cumberland | R | | |
| 79-452 | Nubble (The) | | Addison | Washington | R | | |
| 59-369 | Nubble (The) | | Swan's Island | Hancock | R | | |
| 79-049 | Nubble (The) | | Pembroke | Washington | R | | |
| 55-228 | Nubble (The) | | Freeport | Cumberland | R | | |
| 63-725 | Nublin (1st) | | Friendship | Knox | R | | |
| 63-726 | Nublin (2nd) | | Friendship | Knox | R | | |
| 63-728 | Nublin Ledges | | Friendship | Knox | R | | |
| 55-158 | Oak | Hen | Harpswell | Cumberland | R | | |
| 73-114 | Oak | | Woolwich | Sagadahoc | R | | |
| 63-012 | Oak | | North Haven | Knox | R | Private, bare island, oaks long since logged off, used sometimes by Outward Bound soloists | |
| 63-421 | Oak | | State of Maine | Knox | R | | |
| 55-169 | Oak | | Harpswell | Cumberland | U | | 1 acre (0.40 ha) |
| 55-168 | Oak | | Harpswell | Cumberland | U | | 0.5 acres (0.20 ha) |
| 65-342 | Oak (Little) | | Wiscasset | Lincoln | R | | |
| 65-154 | Oar | | Bremen | Lincoln | R | | |
| 65-156 | Oar Island Ledge | | Bremen | Lincoln | U | | 0.5 acres (0.20 ha) |
| 55-359 | Obed's Rock | | Long Island | Cumberland | T | ME IF&W | 1 acre (0.40 ha) |
| 65-263 | Ocean | | Boothbay | Lincoln | R | | |
| 59-382 | Off Shore Ledge | | Swan's Island | Hancock | R | | |
| 63-483 | Ohio | | Vinalhaven | Knox | R | | |
| 63-839 | Old Humps Ledges | | St. George | Knox | E | Exempt - IF&W 1969 | |
| 63-838 | Old Humps Ledges | | St. George | Knox | E | Exempt - IF&W 1969 | |
| 79-313 | Old Man (East) | | Cutler | Washington | R | | |
| 79-298 | Old Man (West) | | Cutler | Washington | R | | |
| 59-304 | Old Soaker | | Bar Harbor | Hancock | U | | 0.5 acres (0.20 ha) |
| 63-433 | | | Muscle Ridge Shoals Twp. | Knox | R | | |
| 59-665 | Oliver's | | Brooksville | Hancock | R | | |
| 59-350 | Opechee | Calf | Swan's Island | Hancock | R | Private, used by Maine Environmental Research Institute | 256 acres (104 ha) |
| 59-354 | Orono | | Swan's Island | Hancock | R | Private, unoccupied | |
| 55-181 | Orr's | | Harpswell | Cumberland | E | Inhabited year-round, connected to the mainland by bridges | |
| 65-098 | Osprey | | South Bristol | Lincoln | R | | |
| 59-779 | Osprey's Nest | | Deer Isle | Hancock | R | | |
| 63-771 | Otter | | Friendship | Knox | R | | |
| 63-183 | Otter | | Vinalhaven | Knox | R | Private, uninhabited | |
| 63-410 | Otter | | Owls Head | Knox | R | | |
| 79-765 | Otter | | Harrington | Washington | U | | 1 acre (0.40 ha) |
| 59-965 | Otter (Small) | Little Coombs | Stonington | Hancock | R | | |
| 73-262 | Outer Head | | Georgetown | Sagadahoc | T | Maine Bureau of Parks & Lands | 2 acres (0.81 ha) |
| 55-373 | Overset | | Long Island | Cumberland | R | | |
| 65-160 | Ozone Point | | Bremen | Lincoln | R | | |
| 65-169 | Palmer | | Bremen | Lincoln | R | | |
| 79-264 | Parker | | Lubec | Washington | R | | |
| 59-594 | Parker's | | Brooksville | Hancock | R | | |
| 79-786 | Partridge | | Milbridge | Washington | R | | |
| 59-652 | Partridge | Bengon's | Brooksville | Hancock | R | | |
| 79-914 | Pea Ledges | | Milbridge | Washington | U | | 1 acre (0.40 ha) |
| 79-651 | Peabody (Big) | | Jonesport | Washington | R | | |
| 79-650 | Peabody (Little) | | Jonesport | Washington | R | | |
| 59-774 | Peaked | | Deer Isle | Hancock | R | | |
| 55-392 | Peaks | | Portland | Cumberland | E | Inhabited year round, a densely populated suburb connected to Portland by regular ferry, some forested interior owned by the city of Portland or state of Maine | |
| 65-114 | Peboe | | South Bristol | Lincoln | R | | |
| 73-091 | Peggy | | Georgetown | Sagadahoc | R | | |
| 59-872 | Peggy's | Thurlows Knob | Stonington | Hancock | R | | |
| 55-500 | Peggy's Ledge | | Portland | Cumberland | R | | |
| 63-215 | Pell's | | Isle au Haut | Knox | R | Private, "owned by benevolent rusticators who have allowed the island to revert to its natural state." | |
| 63-093 | Penobscot | | Vinalhaven | Knox | R | | |
| 63-101 | Penobscot | | Vinalhaven | Knox | R | | |
| 63-089 | Penobscot (Little) | | Vinalhaven | Knox | U | | 0.5 acres (0.20 ha) |
| 59-186 | Pepper | | Sorrento | Hancock | R | | |
| 65-239 | Perch | | Boothbay | Lincoln | R | | |
| 73-186 | Perkins | | Georgetown | Sagadahoc | U | Home to Perkins Island Light | 6.9 acres (2.8 ha) |
| 65-113 | Peters | | South Bristol | Lincoln | R | | |
| 59-690 | Peter's Ledge | | Brooksville | Hancock | R | | |
| 79-933 | Petit Manan | | Milbridge | Washington | E | Exempt - Dept. of Interior. Home to Petit Manan Light. | |
| 79-011 | Pettegrove Point | | Calais | Washington | U | | 0.5 acres (0.20 ha) |
| 55-229 | Pettingill's | | Freeport | Cumberland | R | | |
| 73-175 | Pettis Rock | | Phippsburg | Sagadahoc | U | | 0.5 acres (0.20 ha) |
| 73-254 | Phoebe | | Georgetown | Sagadahoc | R | | |
| 73-253 | Phoebe (Little) | | Georgetown | Sagadahoc | R | | |
| 59-973 | Phoebe Ledge | | Stonington | Hancock | E | | |
| 59-216 | Phoney | | Tremont | Hancock | R | | |
| 59-715 | Pickering 1 (Little) | | State of Maine | Hancock | R | Private, under conservation easements, summer cottages. | |
| 59-721 | Pickering 2 (Little) | | State of Maine | Hancock | R | | |
| 59-682 | Pickering's | | Deer Isle | Hancock | R | | |
| 79-520 | Pig | | Beals | Washington | R | | |
| 79-542 | Pig | | Beals | Washington | U | | 0.5 acres (0.20 ha) |
| 79-538 | Pig | | Beals | Washington | U | | 0.5 acres (0.20 ha) |
| 79-539 | Pig | | Beals | Washington | U | | 0.5 acres (0.20 ha) |
| 79-541 | Pig | | Beals | Washington | U | | 0.5 acres (0.20 ha) |
| 79-521 | Pig (Little) | | Beals | Washington | R | | |
| 59-815 | Pigeon | | Deer Isle | Hancock | R | | |
| 79-227 | Pine | | Trescott Twp. | Washington | R | | |
| 79-228 | Pine | | Trescott Twp. | Washington | R | | |
| 73-122 | Pine | | Woolwich | Sagadahoc | R | | |
| 79-232 | Pine | | Trescott Twp. | Washington | R | | |
| 55-404 | Pinkham | | Harpswell | Cumberland | R | | |
| 55-044 | Pinkham | Negro, Spaulding | Harpswell | Cumberland | R | | |
| 79-787 | Pinkham's | | Milbridge | Washington | R | | |
| 79-230 | Pirates | | Trescott Twp. | Washington | R | | |
| 79-229 | Pirates | | Trescott Twp. | Washington | R | | |
| 79-231 | Pirates | | Trescott Twp. | Washington | R | | |
| 59-438 | Placentia | | Frenchboro | Hancock | R | | |
| 63-647 | Pleasant | | State of Maine | Knox | R | | |
| 55-047 | Plum | | Harpswell | Cumberland | R | | |
| 79-619 | Plummer (East) | | Addison | Washington | R | | |
| 79-635 | Plummer (West) | | Addison | Washington | R | | |
| 79-620 | Plummer Ledge | | Addison | Washington | U | | 0.5 acres (0.20 ha) |
| 63-753 | Point Reef (Northeast) | | Friendship | Knox | R | | |
| 55-116 | Pole | | Harpswell | Cumberland | E | Exempt — 4 or more residential structures | |
| 63-490 | Pole | | Vinalhaven | Knox | R | | |
| 65-196 | Polins Island Ledges | | Bristol | Lincoln | U | | 0.5 acres (0.20 ha) |
| 59-850 | Pollypod | | Deer Isle | Hancock | R | | |
| 79-408 | Pomp | | Beals | Washington | R | | |
| 79-406 | Pomps | | Beals | Washington | U | | 0.5 acres (0.20 ha) |
| 73-282 | Pond | | Phippsburg | Sagadahoc | E | Exempt — 4 or more residential structures. Home to Pond Island Light, which can be seen clearly from Popham Beach. | |
| 55-612 | Pond | | Harpswell | Cumberland | E | Exempt - IF&W 1978 V4353 Pg152 | |
| 59-064 | Pond | | Winter Harbor | Hancock | E | Dept. of Interior | |
| 55-613 | Pond | | Harpswell | Cumberland | E | Exempt - IF&W 1978 V4353 p. 152 | |
| 79-912 | Pond | | Milbridge | Washington | E | Exempt — 4 or more residential structures. Home to Narraguagus Light. | |
| 55-614 | Pond | | Harpswell | Cumberland | E | Exempt - IF&W 1978 V4353 p. 152 | |
| 59-677 | Pond | | Deer Isle | Hancock | R | | |
| 59-678 | Pond | | Deer Isle | Hancock | R | | |
| 59-347 | Pond | | Frenchboro | Hancock | R | | |
| 65-198 | Pond | Ross | Bristol | Lincoln | R | | |
| 63-430 | Pond (Great) | | State of Maine | Knox | R | Private. There actually is no pond on the island, but there is a spring. Summer residents, primarily lobstermen. | |
| 63-423 | Pond (Little) | | Muscle Ridge Shoals Twp. | Knox | R | | |
| 79-460 | Pond Cove | | Roque Bluffs | Washington | R | | |
| 79-687 | Pond Head Ledge (Little) | | Beals | Washington | R | | |
| 55-616 | Pond Island | | Harpswell | Cumberland | R | | 22.4 acres (9.1 ha) |
| 63-424 | Pond Island Ledge | | Muscle Ridge Shoals Twp. | Knox | R | | |
| 55-615 | Pond Island Ledges | | Harpswell | Cumberland | E | Exempt - IF&W | 22.7 acres (9.2 ha) |
| 79-832 | Pop | | Steuben | Washington | R | | |
| 79-831 | Pop Island Ledge | | Steuben | Washington | U | | 0.5 acres (0.20 ha) |
| 79-371 | Pope's Folly | | Lubec | Washington | T | ME IF&W | 2 acres (0.81 ha) |
| 63-261 | Popplestone Ledge (North) | | Isle au Haut | Knox | T | ME IF&W | 2 acres (0.81 ha) |
| 63-265 | Popplestone Ledge (South) | | Isle au Haut | Knox | T | ME IF&W | 4 acres (1.6 ha) |
| 79-395 | Porcupine | | Machiasport | Washington | R | | |
| 59-571 | Porcupine | | Verona Island | Hancock | R | | |
| 59-799 | Porcupine (Inner) | | Deer Isle | Hancock | R | | |
| 59-800 | Porcupine (Outer) | | State of Maine | Hancock | R | Private, used by Outward Bound soloists | |
| 59-196 | Porcupine Dry Ledge | | Gouldsboro | Hancock | U | | 0.5 acres (0.20 ha) |
| 59-801 | Porcupine Nob (Outer) | | State of Maine | Hancock | R | | |
| 79-902 | Pot Rock | | Addison | Washington | T | ME IF&W | 0.5 acres (0.20 ha) |
| 55-049 | Potato | | Harpswell | Cumberland | R | | |
| 59-404 | Potato | | Swan's Island | Hancock | R | | |
| 63-150 | Potato | | Vinalhaven | Knox | R | | |
| 59-910 | Potato | | Stonington | Hancock | R | | |
| 59-892 | Potato | | Stonington | Hancock | R | | |
| 59-944 | Potato | | Deer Isle | Hancock | U | | 2 acres (0.81 ha) |
| 73-026 | Pound Of Tea | | West Bath | Sagadahoc | R | | |
| 55-242 | Pound Of Tea | | Freeport | Cumberland | R | | |
| 65-118 | Poverty Nub | | Bristol | Lincoln | R | | |
| 63-441 | Poverty Nub | | South Thomaston | Knox | R | | |
| 63-151 | Powder Hole | | Vinalhaven | Knox | U | | 0.5 acres (0.20 ha) |
| 65-414 | Powderhorn | | Boothbay Harbor | Lincoln | R | | |
| 65-413 | Powderhorn | | Boothbay Harbor | Lincoln | R | | |
| 65-415 | Powderhorn | | Boothbay Harbor | Lincoln | U | | 1 acre (0.40 ha) |
| 59-871 | Powderhouse | | Stonington | Hancock | R | | |
| 65-449 | Pratt's | | Southport | Lincoln | E | Exempt — 4 or more residential structures | |
| 81-122 | Prebble | | York | York | R | | |
| 81-130 | Prebble | | York | York | R | | |
| 81-123 | Prebble | | York | York | R | | |
| 59-183 | Preble | | Sorrento | Hancock | R | | |
| 65-100 | Prentiss | | South Bristol | Lincoln | R | | |
| 81-098 | President Bush | Green | Kennebunkport | York | R | | |
| 59-017 | Prospect Harbor | | Gouldsboro | Hancock | U | | 0.5 acres (0.20 ha) |
| 59-018 | Prospect Harbor | | Gouldsboro | Hancock | U | | 0.5 acres (0.20 ha) |
| 63-924 | Pudding | | Criehaven Twp. | Knox | T | ME IF&W | 3 acres (1.2 ha) |
| 79-576 | Pulpit Rock | | Jonesport | Washington | T | ME IF&W | 2 acres (0.81 ha) |
| 63-342 | Pulpit Rock | | North Haven | Knox | U | | 0.5 acres (0.20 ha) |
| 59-702 | Pumpkin | | Deer Isle | Hancock | R | Home to discontinued Pumpkin Island Light | |
| 65-287 | Pumpkin | | Boothbay | Lincoln | U | | 7 acres (2.8 ha) |
| 59-589 | Pumpkin | | Penobscot | Hancock | U | | 0.5 acres (0.20 ha) |
| 59-701 | Pumpkin | | State of Maine | Hancock | U | Private, summer residence | 0.5 acres (0.20 ha) |
| 65-285 | Pumpkin Ledge | | Boothbay | Lincoln | U | | 0.5 acres (0.20 ha) |
| 65-284 | Pumpkin Ledge | | Boothbay | Lincoln | U | | 0.5 acres (0.20 ha) |
| 65-286 | Pumpkin Ledge | | Boothbay | Lincoln | U | | 0.5 acres (0.20 ha) |
| 55-371 | Pumpkin Nob | | Portland | Cumberland | R | | |
| 55-241 | Pumpkin Nob | | Freeport | Cumberland | R | | |
| 65-037 | Pyne | | Bremen | Lincoln | R | | |
| 59-823 | Rabbit | | Stonington | Hancock | R | | |
| 63-278 | Rabbit's Ear | | Isle au Haut | Knox | U | | 2 acres (0.81 ha) |
| 63-375 | Rackliff | | St. George | Knox | E | Private, formerly quarries and farms, now connected by causeway to mainland and densely developed | |
| 63-930 | Ragged | Criehaven | State of Maine | Knox | E | Seasonal habitation, private, old farms and meadows. Together with Matinicus and Monhegan among the most remote of the inhabited Maine islands. | 300 acres (120 ha) |
| 55-626 | Ragged | Parkers | Harpswell | Cumberland | R | | 74.9 acres (30.3 ha) |
| 55-625 | Ragged Island Ledges | | Harpswell | Cumberland | T | ME IF&W | 0.5 acres (0.20 ha) |
| 55-623 | Ragged Island Ledges | | Harpswell | Cumberland | T | ME IF&W | 0.5 acres (0.20 ha) |
| 55-624 | Ragged Island Ledges | | Harpswell | Cumberland | T | ME IF&W | 0.5 acres (0.20 ha) |
| 81-161 | Ram | | Kittery | York | R | | |
| 59-453 | Ram | | Tremont | Hancock | R | | |
| 79-644 | Ram | | Beals | Washington | R | | |
| 65-405 | Ram | | Boothbay Harbor | Lincoln | R | Home to Ram Island Light | |
| 65-404 | Ram | | Boothbay Harbor | Lincoln | R | | |
| 55-521 | Ram | | Cape Elizabeth | Cumberland | R | | 2.8 acres (1.1 ha) |
| 63-799 | Ram | | St. George | Knox | R | | |
| 79-623 | Ram | | Addison | Washington | R | | |
| 59-651 | Ram | | Castine | Hancock | R | | |
| 81-011 | Ram | | Saco | York | R | Private, three-room camp, summer rusticator's island one mile offshore | 1 acre (0.40 ha) |
| 65-161 | Ram | | Bremen | Lincoln | R | | |
| 65-162 | Ram | | Bremen | Lincoln | R | | |
| 59-410 | Ram | | Swan's Island | Hancock | R | | 0 acres (0 ha) |
| 55-383 | Ram | | Portland | Cumberland | R | | 14.1 acres (5.7 ha) |
| 59-689 | Ram | | Castine | Hancock | R | | |
| 63-082 | Ram | | Vinalhaven | Knox | R | | |
| 63-544 | Ram | | St. George | Knox | R | Private, five acres, summer residence | |
| 77-045 | Ram | | Islesboro | Waldo | R | Private, used by summer rusticators | |
| 63-323 | Ram | | Rockport | Knox | R | Privately owned, significant seabird nesting island | 1.1 acres (0.45 ha) |
| 55-605 | Ram | Sheep | Harpswell | Cumberland | R | | 6.3 acres (2.5 ha) |
| 73-069 | Ram | | Bath | Sagadahoc | R | | |
| 65-271 | Ram | | Boothbay | Lincoln | R | | |
| 73-085 | Ram | | Woolwich | Sagadahoc | R | | |
| 63-731 | Ram | | Friendship | Knox | R | | |
| 59-596 | Ram | | Brooksville | Hancock | R | | |
| 79-552 | Ram | | Machiasport | Washington | R | Private, 20-by-20-foot (6.1 by 6.1 m) tent platform, no other amenities | 16 acres (6.5 ha) |
| 63-481 | Ram | | Vinalhaven | Knox | U | | 4 acres (1.6 ha) |
| 63-211 | Ram | | Isle au Haut | Knox | U | Owned by State of Maine | 4 acres (1.6 ha) |
| 73-167 | Ram | | Phippsburg | Sagadahoc | U | | 0.5 acres (0.20 ha) |
| 59-966 | Ram | | Stonington | Hancock | U | | 4 acres (1.6 ha) |
| 79-601 | Ram (Big) | | Beals | Washington | R | | |
| 65-403 | Ram (Inner) | | Boothbay | Lincoln | R | | |
| 63-155 | Ram (Little) | | Vinalhaven | Knox | R | | |
| 79-462 | Ram (Little) | | Roque Bluffs | Washington | R | | |
| 79-600 | Ram (Little) | | Beals | Washington | R | | |
| 79-602 | Ram (Outer) | | Beals | Washington | R | | |
| 55-607 | Ram Island Ledge | | Harpswell | Cumberland | U | | 1 acre (0.40 ha) |
| 55-606 | Ram Island Ledge | | Harpswell | Cumberland | U | | 0.5 acres (0.20 ha) |
| 55-604 | Ram Island Ledge | | Harpswell | Cumberland | U | | 0.5 acres (0.20 ha) |
| 55-603 | Ram Island Ledge | | Harpswell | Cumberland | U | | 0.5 acres (0.20 ha) |
| 73-068 | Ram Islet | | Bath | Sagadahoc | R | | |
| 55-384 | Ram Ledge | | Portland | Cumberland | R | | |
| 55-127 | Raspberry | Pumpkin Nub | Harpswell | Cumberland | R | | |
| 63-487 | Raspberry | | Vinalhaven | Knox | R | | |
| 55-129 | Raspberry | | Harpswell | Cumberland | R | | |
| 63-829 | Raspberry | | St. George | Knox | R | | |
| 63-828 | Raspberry | | St. George | Knox | R | | |
| 63-827 | Raspberry | | St. George | Knox | R | | |
| 79-739 | Raspberry | | Addison | Washington | R | | |
| 55-079 | Rat | | Harpswell | Cumberland | R | | |
| 55-635 | Rat | | Harpswell | Cumberland | R | | |
| 73-075 | Ray's | | Woolwich | Sagadahoc | R | | |
| 79-147 | Razor | | Lubec | Washington | T | ME IF&W | 0.5 acres (0.20 ha) |
| 73-077 | Read | | Woolwich | Sagadahoc | U | | 0.5 acres (0.20 ha) |
| 73-078 | Read | | Woolwich | Sagadahoc | U | | 0.5 acres (0.20 ha) |
| 79-137 | Red | | Perry | Washington | T | ME IF&W | 1 acre (0.40 ha) |
| 63-144 | Red Lion | | Vinalhaven | Knox | R | | |
| 79-138 | Redington | | Perry | Washington | R | | |
| 81-091 | Redin's | | Kennebunkport | York | R | | |
| 59-686 | Resolution | | State of Maine | Hancock | R | | |
| 65-219 | Richardson's | Tree, includes Richardson Ledge | South Bristol | Lincoln | R | | |
| 63-273 | Riches Ledge | | Isle au Haut | Knox | U | | 0.5 acres (0.20 ha) |
| 63-272 | Riches Ledge | | Isle au Haut | Knox | U | | 0.5 acres (0.20 ha) |
| 55-579 | Richmond | | Cape Elizabeth | Cumberland | R | Privately owned, inhabited by sheep | 226 acres (91 ha) |
| 79-778 | Ripley (Big) | | Harrington | Washington | R | | |
| 79-776 | Ripley (Inner) | | Harrington | Washington | R | | |
| 79-777 | Ripley (Little) | | Harrington | Washington | R | | |
| 79-304 | River (Little) | | Cutler | Washington | E | Exempt - Dept. of Interior. Home to Little River Lighthouse. | |
| 63-174 | Roberts | | Vinalhaven | Knox | R | Private, summer visitors only | |
| 63-175 | Roberts (East) | | Vinalhaven | Knox | T | United States Of America | 4 acres (1.6 ha) |
| 63-341 | Robinson Rock | | North Haven | Knox | E | Exempt - IF&W 1971 | |
| 63-340 | Robinson Rock | | North Haven | Knox | T | ME IF&W | 0.5 acres (0.20 ha) |
| 59-630 | Rock | | Blue Hill | Hancock | R | | |
| 59-879 | Rock | | Stonington | Hancock | R | Private | |
| 79-489 | Rock | | Jonesport | Washington | R | | |
| 63-037 | Rock | | North Haven | Knox | U | | 0.5 acres (0.20 ha) |
| 65-460 | Rock Pines | | Southport | Lincoln | R | | |
| 79-246 | Rodgers | | Lubec | Washington | R | | |
| 79-245 | Rodgers | | Lubec | Washington | R | | |
| 79-846 | Rogers Point | | Steuben | Washington | R | | |
| 55-150 | Rogue | | Harpswell | Cumberland | R | | 5 acres (2.0 ha) |
| 73-150 | Rogue | | Phippsburg | Sagadahoc | U | | 0.5 acres (0.20 ha) |
| 55-151 | Rogue Island Rock | | Harpswell | Cumberland | U | | 0.5 acres (0.20 ha) |
| 55-441 | Rogues | | Chebeague Island | Cumberland | R | | |
| 59-060 | Rolland | Rolling | Winter Harbor | Hancock | R | Acadia National Park, closed to protect nesting eagles February 15 - August 31 acres (13 ha) | 5.1 acres (2.1 ha) |
| 79-475 | Roque | | Jonesport | Washington | R | | |
| 79-595 | Roque Ledge | | Jonesport | Washington | R | | |
| 79-478 | Roque Ledge | | Jonesport | Washington | R | | |
| 79-471 | Roque Ledge | | Jonesport | Washington | R | | |
| 79-472 | Roque Ledge | | Jonesport | Washington | R | | |
| 79-473 | Roque Ledge | | Jonesport | Washington | R | | |
| 79-474 | Roque Ledge | | Jonesport | Washington | R | | |
| 63-218 | Rose Bud | | Isle au Haut | Knox | R | | |
| 59-899 | Round | | Stonington | Hancock | R | Private, acquired by Nature Conservancy in the 1960s, reverting to natural state | |
| 79-286 | Round | | Machiasport | Washington | R | | |
| 59-110 | Round | Buckskin | Franklin | Hancock | R | | 5.6 acres (2.3 ha) |
| 59-360 | Round | Garden | Swan's Island | Hancock | R | | |
| 79-422 | Round Goose | | Addison | Washington | R | | |
| 59-199 | Rum Key | | Gouldsboro | Hancock | R | | |
| 59-238 | Rumill's Hub | | Tremont | Hancock | R | | |
| 59-867 | Russ | | Stonington | Hancock | R | Acquired by Island Institute in 1970, part of Maine Island Trail | |
| 65-234 | Rutherford | | South Bristol | Lincoln | E | Exempt — 4 or more residential structures | |
| 63-477 | Rye (Little) | | Vinalhaven | Knox | R | | |
| 63-338 | Saddle | | North Haven | Knox | R | | |
| 59-972 | Saddleback | | Stonington | Hancock | R | Access to the island is challenging due to the lack of beaches and designated landing areas. The most suitable methods for landing are by kayak or dinghy, which can be brought ashore onto the smooth granite shoreline at certain locations under calm conditions.It is owned by MCHT and is open to the public. | 78 acres (32 ha) |
| 59-999 | Saddleback | | Swan's Island | Hancock | T | ME IF&W | 2 acres (0.81 ha) |
| 63-237 | Saddleback Ledge | | Vinalhaven | Knox | E | Owned by US Dept. of Interior; home to Saddleback Ledge Light | |
| 79-373 | Sail Rock | | Lubec | Washington | T | Maine Bureau of Parks & Lands | 0.5 acres (0.20 ha) |
| 59-037 | Sally | | Gouldsboro | Hancock | R | Owned by U.S. Fish and Wildlife Service's Maine Coastal Islands Wildlife Refuge | 5.3 acres (2.1 ha) |
| 79-836 | Sally | | Steuben | Washington | R | | |
| 79-285 | Salt | | Machiasport | Washington | R | | |
| 59-185 | Salt | | Sorrento | Hancock | R | | |
| 73-215 | Salter | | Georgetown | Sagadahoc | R | | |
| 59-718 | Sam Crockett's | Clam | Deer Isle | Hancock | R | | |
| 59-035 | Sampsong Point | | Gouldsboro | Hancock | U | | 0.5 acres (0.20 ha) |
| 59-587 | Sam's | Hermit's | Penobscot | Hancock | R | | |
| 59-822 | Sam's | | Deer Isle | Hancock | R | | |
| 59-880 | Sand | | Stonington | Hancock | R | Private, summer use only | |
| 55-425 | Sand | | Chebeague Island | Cumberland | R | | |
| 63-730 | Sand | | Friendship | Knox | R | | |
| 59-243 | Sand | | Brooklin | Hancock | T | ME IF&W | 0.5 acres (0.20 ha) |
| 79-614 | Sand (Inner) | | Addison | Washington | R | | |
| 63-729 | Sand (Little) | | Friendship | Knox | R | | |
| 79-617 | Sand (Outer) | | Addison | Washington | R | | |
| 55-101 | Sandy Isle | | Brunswick | Cumberland | R | | |
| 59-015 | Sargents | | Winter Harbor | Hancock | R | | |
| 65-378 | Sawyer | | Boothbay | Lincoln | E | Exempt — 4 or more residential structures | |
| 59-849 | Sawyer's | | Deer Isle | Hancock | R | | |
| 79-421 | Sawyer's | | Addison | Washington | R | | |
| 59-433 | Sawyer's | | Tremont | Hancock | R | | |
| 59-848 | Sawyer's | Sheep | Deer Isle | Hancock | R | | |
| 79-588 | Scabby | | Machiasport | Washington | R | | |
| 79-553 | Scabby | | Machiasport | Washington | R | | |
| 79-554 | Scabby | | Machiasport | Washington | R | | |
| 59-062 | Schoodic | | Winter Harbor | Hancock | R | Uninhabited, shrubs, wetlands, some white pine forest, Acadia National Park, closed to visitors February 15-August 15 to avoid disturbing nesting birds | 67.2 acres (27.2 ha) |
| 59-073 | Schoodic Island Ledge | | Winter Harbor | Hancock | U | | 0.5 acres (0.20 ha) |
| 79-566 | Schoppee | | Roque Bluffs | Washington | R | | |
| 79-350 | Scotch | | Cutler | Washington | R | | |
| 59-709 | Scott (Outer) | Little Scott | Deer Isle | Hancock | R | | |
| 59-707 | Scott's | | State of Maine | Hancock | R | | |
| 59-875 | Scott's | Round | Stonington | Hancock | R | Private, former quarries | |
| 59-595 | Scott's | Narrow's | Brooksville | Hancock | R | | |
| 59-836 | Scrag | Scraggly | Stonington | Hancock | R | | |
| 59-788 | Scrag | | State of Maine | Hancock | R | Private, summer cottage | |
| 59-475 | Scrag | | Swan's Island | Hancock | R | Private, waterless, uninhabited | |
| 55-100 | Scrag | | Harpswell | Cumberland | R | | |
| 59-476 | Scrag | | Swan's Island | Hancock | U | | 0.5 acres (0.20 ha) |
| 59-477 | Scrag | | Swan's Island | Hancock | U | | 1 acre (0.40 ha) |
| 63-205 | Scrag Ledge (Outer) | | Isle au Haut | Knox | T | ME IF&W | 0.5 acres (0.20 ha) |
| 59-838 | Scraggy Island Ledge | | Stonington | Hancock | T | ME IF&W | 1 acre (0.40 ha) |
| 59-837 | Scraggy Island Ledge | | Stonington | Hancock | T | ME IF&W | 1 acre (0.40 ha) |
| 63-209 | Scraggy Ledge | | Isle au Haut | Knox | T | ME IF&W | 0.5 acres (0.20 ha) |
| 55-330 | Screeching Gull | | Falmouth | Cumberland | T | ME IF&W | 0.1 acres (0.040 ha) |
| 79-249 | Scrub | | Lubec | Washington | R | | |
| 79-607 | Seaduck Rock | | Addison | Washington | T | ME IF&W | 0.5 acres (0.20 ha) |
| 63-923 | Seal | | Vinalhaven | Knox | E | Exempt — 4 or more residential structures | |
| 77-046 | Seal | | Islesboro | Waldo | R | | |
| 73-311 | Seal | | Phippsburg | Sagadahoc | R | | |
| 63-637 | Seal | Hay | St. George | Knox | R | | |
| 73-323 | Seal | | Phippsburg | Sagadahoc | R | | |
| 73-325 | Seal | | Phippsburg | Sagadahoc | R | | |
| 73-324 | Seal | | Phippsburg | Sagadahoc | R | | |
| 73-180 | Seal | | Arrowsic | Sagadahoc | U | | 0.5 acres (0.20 ha) |
| 63-637 | Seal | Hay | St. George | Knox | T | ME IF&W | 1 acre (0.40 ha) |
| 63-188 | Seal Bay Nubble | | Vinalhaven | Knox | R | | |
| 79-924 | Seal Cove Ledge | | Milbridge | Washington | T | ME IF&W | 0.5 acres (0.20 ha) |
| 63-343 | Seal Ledge | | North Haven | Knox | R | | |
| 63-931 | Seal Ledge | | Criehaven Twp. | Knox | T | ME IF&W | 0.5 acres (0.20 ha) |
| 55-333 | Seal Ledge | | Chebeague Island | Cumberland | U | | 0.5 acres (0.20 ha) |
| 79-700 | Seal Rock | | Beals | Washington | T | ME IF&W | 0.5 acres (0.20 ha) |
| 79-465 | Seal Rock | | Jonesport | Washington | R | | |
| 55-584 | Seal Rocks | | Cape Elizabeth | Cumberland | T | ME IF&W | 1 acre (0.40 ha) |
| 77-011 | Sears | | Searsport | Waldo | R | Connected by causeway to mainland. Undeveloped, reverting to natural state with some remaining traces of 19th-century farming. | 940 acres (380 ha) |
| 81-162 | Seavey | | Kittery | York | E | Portsmouth Naval Shipyard occupies island. | 278 acres (113 ha) |
| 63-800 | Seavey | | St. George | Knox | R | | |
| 59-832 | Second | | Stonington | Hancock | R | Private, uninhabited | |
| 79-496 | Seguin | | Jonesport | Washington | R | | |
| 59-930 | Seller's | | Brooklin | Hancock | U | | 2 acres (0.81 ha) |
| 73-320 | Seguin | | Georgetown | Sagadahoc | E | Exempt - Dept. of Interior. Home to the Seguin Light. | |
| 73-317 | Seguin Ledge | | Georgetown | Sagadahoc | T | ME IF&W | 0.5 acres (0.20 ha) |
| 73-318 | Seguin Ledge | | Georgetown | Sagadahoc | T | ME IF&W | 0.5 acres (0.20 ha) |
| 77-054 | Seven Hundred Acre | | Islesboro | Waldo | E | Private, summer home of rusticators including illustrator Charles Dana Gibson and now owned almost in its entirety by his descendants | 700 acres (280 ha) |
| 79-637 | Sevens Island Ledge | | Addison | Washington | T | ME IF&W | 1 acre (0.40 ha) |
| 79-411 | Shabbit Island Ledge | | Addison | Washington | U | | 0.5 acres (0.20 ha) |
| 79-416 | Shabbits | | Addison | Washington | R | | |
| 59-996 | Shabby | | Deer Isle | Hancock | R | | |
| 79-780 | Shag | | Harrington | Washington | T | ME IF&W | 0.5 acres (0.20 ha) |
| 79-556 | Shag | | Machiasport | Washington | T | ME IF&W | |
| 63-925 | Shag Ledge | | Criehaven Twp. | Knox | T | ME IF&W | 2 acres (0.81 ha) |
| 59-032 | Shag Ledge | | Gouldsboro | Hancock | U | | 0.5 acres (0.20 ha) |
| 63-824 | Shag Ledges | | St. George | Knox | T | ME IF&W | 0.9 acres (0.36 ha) |
| 63-821 | Shag Ledges | | St. George | Knox | T | ME IF&W | 1 acre (0.40 ha) |
| 63-820 | Shag Ledges | | St. George | Knox | T | ME IF&W | 1 acre (0.40 ha) |
| 63-463 | Shag Rock | | Vinalhaven | Knox | R | | |
| 81-186 | Shag Rock | | Kittery | York | R | | |
| 79-575 | Shag Rock | | Jonesport | Washington | U | | 0 acres (0 ha) |
| 63-389 | Shag Rock | | Owls Head | Knox | U | | 0.5 acres (0.20 ha) |
| 63-875 | Shark | Shark Rock | St. George | Knox | E | Exempt - IF&W 1969 | |
| 55-060 | Sheep | | Harpswell | Cumberland | E | | |
| 59-039 | Sheep | | Gouldsboro | Hancock | R | | 9.4 acres (3.8 ha) |
| 63-566 | Sheep | Seavey | St. George | Knox | R | | |
| 59-710 | Sheep | | Deer Isle | Hancock | R | Private, first private island to be included on Maine Island Trail | |
| 59-953 | Sheep | | Stonington | Hancock | R | | |
| 79-441 | Sheep | | Addison | Washington | R | | |
| 63-018 | Sheep | | North Haven | Knox | R | | |
| 59-943 | Sheep | | Deer Isle | Hancock | R | Private, protected by conservation easement | |
| 59-653 | Sheep | | Brooksville | Hancock | R | | |
| 63-393 | Sheep | | Owls Head | Knox | R | Private, uninhabited because surrounding shoals and ledges preclude access | |
| 63-136 | Sheep | | Vinalhaven | Knox | R | | |
| 63-064 | Sheep | | Vinalhaven | Knox | R | Private, uninhabited | |
| 79-835 | Sheep | | Steuben | Washington | R | | |
| 59-348 | Sheep | | Swan's Island | Hancock | R | Private, reverting to natural state | |
| 59-261 | Sheep | | Mount Desert | Hancock | U | Uninhabited, spruce, birch, poplar and maple forest, Acadia National Park | 22 acres (8.9 ha) |
| 79-514 | Sheep (Big) | | Jonesport | Washington | R | | |
| 79-400 | Sheep (East) | | Beals | Washington | R | | |
| 65-128 | Sheep (Little) | | South Bristol | Lincoln | R | | |
| 79-515 | Sheep (Little) | | Jonesport | Washington | R | | |
| 59-954 | Sheep (Little) | | Stonington | Hancock | U | | 1.6 acres (0.65 ha) |
| 63-161 | Sheep (Small) | | Vinalhaven | Knox | R | | |
| 79-401 | Sheep (West) | | Beals | Washington | R | | |
| 59-262 | Sheep Island | | Mount Desert | Hancock | R | | |
| 59-916 | Sheep Island Ledge | | Stonington | Hancock | U | | 0.5 acres (0.20 ha) |
| 63-396 | Sheep Island Ledge | | Owls Head | Knox | U | | 0.5 acres (0.20 ha) |
| 59-955 | Sheep Island Ledge | | Stonington | Hancock | U | | 0.5 acres (0.20 ha) |
| 63-397 | Sheep Island Ledge | | Owls Head | Knox | U | | 0.5 acres (0.20 ha) |
| 59-263 | Sheep Ledge | The Lamb | Mount Desert | Hancock | R | | |
| 55-059 | Sheep North Ledges | | Harpswell | Cumberland | U | | 0.5 acres (0.20 ha) |
| 55-058 | Sheep North Ledges | | Harpswell | Cumberland | U | | 0.5 acres (0.20 ha) |
| 55-057 | Sheep North Ledges | | Harpswell | Cumberland | U | | 0.5 acres (0.20 ha) |
| 55-070 | Sheep North Ledges | | Harpswell | Cumberland | U | | 0.5 acres (0.20 ha) |
| 59-195 | Sheep Porcupine | | Gouldsboro | Hancock | E | Acadia National Park, closed to visitors February 15-August 15 to avoid disturbing eagle nesting | |
| 59-820 | Sheephead | Sunset | Deer Isle | Hancock | E | Private, summer cottages | |
| 79-434 | Sheldrake | | Addison | Washington | R | | |
| 59-171 | Sheldrake | | Sorrento | Hancock | R | | |
| 59-978 | Sheldrake | | Stonington | Hancock | U | | 0.5 acres (0.20 ha) |
| 55-254 | Shelter | | Harpswell | Cumberland | R | | |
| 59-959 | Shingle | | Stonington | Hancock | R | | 6 acres (2.4 ha) |
| 59-914 | Shingle Island Ledge | | Stonington | Hancock | R | | 1 acre (0.40 ha) |
| 59-341 | Ship | | Tremont | Hancock | R | | |
| 79-906 | Shipstern | | Harrington | Washington | R | | |
| 59-206 | Shipyard | | Gouldsboro | Hancock | R | | |
| 59-986 | Shivers | | Stonington | Hancock | U | | 0.5 acres (0.20 ha) |
| 55-522 | Shooting Rock | | Scarborough | Cumberland | U | | 0.5 acres (0.20 ha) |
| 79-390 | Simpson's | | East Machias | Washington | R | | |
| 59-447 | Sister (Eastern) | | Swan's Island | Hancock | R | | |
| 59-411 | Sister (Western) | | Swan's Island | Hancock | R | | |
| 55-237 | Sister Ledge | | Freeport | Cumberland | U | | 0.5 acres (0.20 ha) |
| 55-619 | Sisters | | Harpswell | Cumberland | T | ME IF&W | 0.5 acres (0.20 ha) |
| 55-620 | Sisters | | Harpswell | Cumberland | T | ME IF&W | 1 acre (0.40 ha) |
| 55-239 | Sister's | | Freeport | Cumberland | R | | |
| 55-238 | Sister's | | Freeport | Cumberland | R | | |
| 63-498 | Skelton | | Vinalhaven | Knox | R | | |
| 79-689 | Slate | | Beals | Washington | E | Exempt — 4 or more residential structures | |
| 79-690 | Slate | | Beals | Washington | R | | |
| 59-795 | Sloop | | Deer Isle | Hancock | T | ME IF&W | 3 acres (1.2 ha) |
| 59-796 | Sloop Island Ledge | | Deer Isle | Hancock | E | Exempt - IF&W 1969 | |
| 59-807 | Small | | Stonington | Hancock | R | | |
| 79-140 | Small's | | Perry | Washington | R | | |
| 79-057 | Small's | | Pembroke | Washington | R | | |
| 63-126 | Smith | | Vinalhaven | Knox | R | | |
| 63-086 | Smith (Big) | Davis | Vinalhaven | Knox | R | | |
| 63-084 | Smith (Big) (Part Of) | Davids | Vinalhaven | Knox | R | | |
| 63-087 | Smith (Little) | | Vinalhaven | Knox | R | | |
| 65-314 | Smutty Nose | | Monhegan Island Plt. | Lincoln | T | ME IF&W | 1 acre (0.40 ha) |
| 59-931 | Smuttynose | | Brooklin | Hancock | R | Private, no historic use other than as "a navigational marker and for the fishing privilege." | |
| 81-182 | Smuttynose | | Kittery | York | R | Part of Isles of Shoals group | |
| 55-054 | Snow | | Harpswell | Cumberland | R | | |
| 63-588 | Snow | | Matinicus Isle Plt. | Knox | R | | |
| 79-074 | Sol. Seal | Sal Seal | Edmunds Twp. | Washington | T | ME IF&W | 1 acre (0.40 ha) |
| 63-574 | Southern | | St. George | Knox | R | Meadows and spruce forest, owned and inhabited by artists, the late Andrew Wyeth and now his son Jamie Wyeth, who resides in the former Tenants Harbor Lighthouse | |
| 65-468 | Southport | | Southport | Lincoln | E | Exempt — 4 or more residential structures | |
| 55-245 | Sow and Pigs | | Freeport | Cumberland | R | Privately owned | 2.9 acres (1.2 ha) |
| 55-244 | Sow and Pigs | | Freeport | Cumberland | R | | |
| 63-405 | Spalding | Spaulding | Owls Head | Knox | R | Private, linked by tidal bar to mainland | |
| 73-256 | Spar | | Georgetown | Sagadahoc | R | | |
| 79-466 | Spar | | Jonesport | Washington | R | | |
| 79-557 | Spar | Despair | Roque Bluffs | Washington | R | | |
| 59-582 | Spark's | | Penobscot | Hancock | R | | |
| 63-200 | Sparrow | | Isle au Haut | Knox | E | Exempt - IF&W 1969 | |
| 63-201 | Sparrow Island Ledge | | Isle au Haut | Knox | T | ME IF&W | 1 acre (0.40 ha) |
| 59-205 | Spectacle | | Gouldsboro | Hancock | R | | 7 acres (2.8 ha) |
| 59-673 | Spectacle | | Brooksville | Hancock | R | | |
| 79-509 | Spectacle | | Beals | Washington | R | | |
| 63-500 | Spectacle | Bald | Vinalhaven | Knox | R | | |
| 65-417 | Spectacle | | Boothbay Harbor | Lincoln | R | | |
| 63-503 | Spectacle | | Vinalhaven | Knox | R | | |
| 79-132 | Spectacle | | Eastport | Washington | R | | |
| 59-688 | Spectacle | | Brooksville | Hancock | R | | |
| 79-529 | Spectacle | | Beals | Washington | R | | |
| 59-068 | Spectacle | | Winter Harbor | Hancock | R | | |
| 63-065 | Spectacle | | Vinalhaven | Knox | R | | |
| 63-419 | Spectacle | | Muscle Ridge Shoals Twp. | Knox | U | | 0.5 acres (0.20 ha) |
| 65-416 | Spectacle (North) | | Boothbay Harbor | Lincoln | T | Boothbay Region Land Trust | |
| 63-567 | Spectacles | | St. George | Knox | R | Private, uninhabited, once used primarily for grazing sheep | |
| 63-568 | Spectacles | | St. George | Knox | R | | |
| 59-659 | Spindrift | | Brooksville | Hancock | R | | |
| 59-001 | Spirit Ledge | | Swan's Island | Hancock | E | Exempt - IF&W 1969 | |
| 63-287 | Spoon (Great) | | Isle au Haut | Knox | R | Private, unused | 47 acres (19 ha) |
| 63-289 | Spoon (Little) | | Isle au Haut | Knox | R | | |
| 63-011 | Spoon Ledge | | North Haven | Knox | E | Exempt - IF&W 1969 | |
| 81-030 | Springs | | Biddeford | York | E | Exempt — 4 or more residential structures | |
| 77-051 | Spruce | | Islesboro | Waldo | R | Private, uninhabited, returning to natural state | |
| 59-974 | Spruce | | Stonington | Hancock | R | | |
| 79-582 | Spruce (Great) | | Jonesport | Washington | R | | |
| 59-773 | Spruce (Great) | | State of Maine | Hancock | E | Private, seasonal, photographer Eliot and artist Fairfield Porter maintained summer cottage here | |
| 79-482 | Spruce (Great) | | Jonesport | Washington | R | | |
| 79-589 | Spruce (Great) | | Jonesport | Washington | R | | |
| 79-590 | Spruce (Great) | | Jonesport | Washington | R | | |
| 79-483 | Spruce (Great) | | Jonesport | Washington | R | | |
| 79-533 | Spruce (Great) | | Jonesport | Washington | R | | |
| 79-480 | Spruce (Great) | | Jonesport | Washington | R | | |
| 79-591 | Spruce (Great) | | Jonesport | Washington | R | | |
| 79-481 | Spruce (Little) | | Jonesport | Washington | R | | |
| 79-534 | Spruce Ledge (Little) | | Jonesport | Washington | R | | |
| 65-159 | Spruce Nubble | | Bremen | Lincoln | U | | 0.5 acres (0.20 ha) |
| 63-374 | Sprucehead | | South Thomaston | Knox | E | Private, connected to mainland by causeway since 1898, formerly extensive granite quarries, inhabited by lobstermen and some summer rusticators, suburb of Rockland and Thomaston | |
| 59-772 | Sprucehead (Little) | | State of Maine | Hancock | R | Private, summer cottage | |
| 59-264 | Squantum Point Ledges | | Mount Desert | Hancock | U | | 0.5 acres (0.20 ha) |
| 77-010 | | | Stockton Springs | Waldo | R | | |
| 59-221 | Squid | Newbold Preserve | Mount Desert | Hancock | R | | |
| 65-459 | Squirrel | | Southport | Lincoln | E | Private, summer colony, some areas open to visitors. Governed as "village corporation". | 1,280 acres (520 ha) |
| 73-336 | Squirrel | | Phippsburg | Sagadahoc | R | | |
| 79-793 | Squirrel Point | | Harrington | Washington | U | | 0.5 acres (0.20 ha) |
| 59-893 | St. Helena | | Stonington | Hancock | R | Private, summer cottages | |
| 73-058 | St. Paul | | Woolwich | Sagadahoc | R | | |
| 79-012 | St. Croix | | Calais | Washington | E | Exempt - Dept. of Interior. Once home to Saint Croix River Light, which was destroyed by fire in 1976. | |
| 81-016 | Stage | | Biddeford | York | R | | |
| 73-214 | Stage | | Georgetown | Sagadahoc | R | | |
| 81-090 | Stage | | Kennebunkport | York | R | | |
| 73-331 | Stage Island Ledge | | Georgetown | Sagadahoc | U | | 0.5 acres (0.20 ha) |
| 59-222 | Stanalf's | | Mount Desert | Hancock | R | | |
| 79-618 | Stanley Ledge | | Addison | Washington | T | ME IF&W | 1 acre (0.40 ha) |
| 59-708 | Stave | | Deer Isle | Hancock | R | Private, oaks once furnished staves to Castine coopers, good spring, now largely unused except by passing canoeists, parts conserved by Nature Conservancy easements | |
| 55-422 | Stave | | Chebeague Island | Cumberland | R | | |
| 59-180 | Stave | | Gouldsboro | Hancock | R | | |
| 79-660 | Steel Harbor | | Jonesport | Washington | R | | |
| 55-337 | Stepping Stone | | Long Island | Cumberland | T | ME IF&W | 1 acre (0.40 ha) |
| 55-338 | Stepping Stone II | | Long Island | Cumberland | T | ME IF&W | 1 acre (0.40 ha) |
| 59-897 | Steve | | Stonington | Hancock | U | | 2 acres (0.81 ha) |
| 79-608 | Steven's | | Addison | Washington | T | Maine Bureau of Parks & Lands | |
| 59-089 | Stewart's | Kilkenny Cove | Hancock | Hancock | R | | 3.1 acres (1.3 ha) |
| 63-034 | Stimpsons | | North Haven | Knox | R | Private, summer rusticators | |
| 55-401 | Stockman's | | Chebeague Island | Cumberland | R | | |
| 63-113 | Stoddard | | Vinalhaven | Knox | R | | |
| 79-356 | Stone | | Machiasport | Washington | R | | |
| 63-798 | Stone | | St. George | Knox | R | | 17.38 acres (15 ha) |
| 73-065 | Stoney | | Bath | Sagadahoc | R | | |
| 59-403 | Store Point Ledges | | Swan's Island | Hancock | R | | |
| 55-423 | Stowe Island Ledge | | Chebeague Island | Cumberland | U | | 0.5 acres (0.20 ha) |
| 55-421 | Stowe Island Ledge | | Chebeague Island | Cumberland | U | | 0.5 acres (0.20 ha) |
| 55-420 | Stowe Island Ledge | | Chebeague Island | Cumberland | U | | 0.5 acres (0.20 ha) |
| 81-002 | Stratton | | Saco | York | R | | |
| 59-777 | Straus Ledge | | Deer Isle | Hancock | R | | |
| 65-158 | Strawberry | | Bremen | Lincoln | U | | 1 acre (0.40 ha) |
| 55-112 | Strawberry | | Harpswell | Cumberland | U | Owned by the town of Harpswell. | 1 acre (0.40 ha) |
| 79-763 | Strout | | Harrington | Washington | R | | |
| 55-320 | Sturdivant | | Cumberland | Cumberland | E | Exempt — 4 or more residential structures | |
| 73-052 | Sturgeon | | Bath | Sagadahoc | R | | |
| 73-054 | Sturgeon (Little) | | Bath | Sagadahoc | R | | |
| (unnumbered) | Sugar Island | | Brownville | Piscataquis | U | In the Pleasant River at Brownville Junction | 19 acres (7.7 ha) |
| 63-464 | Sugar Loaves | | North Haven | Knox | T | ME IF&W | 0.5 acres (0.20 ha) |
| 63-465 | Sugar Loaves | | North Haven | Knox | T | ME IF&W | 0.5 acres (0.20 ha) |
| 63-466 | Sugar Loaves | | North Haven | Knox | T | ME IF&W | 0.5 acres (0.20 ha) |
| 63-459 | Sugar Loaves | | Vinalhaven | Knox | T | ME IF&W | 0.5 acres (0.20 ha) |
| 73-169 | Sugar Plum | | West Bath | Sagadahoc | R | | |
| 73-213 | Sugarloaf (North) | | Phippsburg | Sagadahoc | E | Exempt - Parks and Recreation | |
| 73-280 | Sugarloaf (South) | | Phippsburg | Sagadahoc | E | Exempt - Parks and Recreation | |
| 63-717 | Suicide | | Friendship | Knox | R | | |
| 59-269 | Sutton | | Cranberry Isles | Hancock | E | Most of eastern half private, seasonally inhabited summer cottages (including cottages for the use of presidents of Harvard), much of western half under conservation easement managed by Acadia National Park | |
| 73-012 | Swan (Little) | | Perkins Twp. | Sagadahoc | E | Exempt - public ownership | |
| 73-010 | Swan Island | | Perkins Twp. | Sagadahoc | E | Exempt - public ownership | 1,433 acres (580 ha) |
| 59-413 | Swan's Island | | Swans Island | Hancock | E | Largely private, inhabited year-round, with considerable summer rusticator population | 8,960 acres (3,630 ha) |
| 59-609 | Swimming Rock | | Blue Hill | Hancock | R | | |
| 79-631 | Tabbutts Ledge | | Addison | Washington | R | | |
| 79-628 | Tabbutts Sheep | | Addison | Washington | R | | |
| 79-222 | Talbot (Inner) | | Trescott Twp. | Washington | R | | 5 acres (2.0 ha) |
| 79-224 | Talbot (Outer) | | Trescott Twp. | Washington | R | | 3 acres (1.2 ha) |
| 63-154 | Talbot's | | Vinalhaven | Knox | R | | |
| 63-153 | Talbot's | | Vinalhaven | Knox | R | | |
| 63-747 | Tammie's | | Cushing | Knox | R | | |
| 59-846 | Tea Kettle | | Deer Isle | Hancock | R | | |
| 63-797 | Teel | | St. George | Knox | R | | |
| 63-598 | Ten Pound | | St. George | Knox | R | | |
| 63-920 | Ten Pound | | Matinicus Isle Plt. | Knox | R | Uninhabited, pasture, owner National Audubon Society | |
| 73-295 | Tenants | | Phippsburg | Sagadahoc | R | | |
| 63-744 | Tern Rock I | | Cushing | Knox | R | | |
| 63-745 | Tern Rock II | | Cushing | Knox | R | | |
| 63-746 | Tern Rock III | | Cushing | Knox | R | | |
| 73-255 | Thatch | | Georgetown | Sagadahoc | R | | |
| 73-302 | The Branch | Wire | Phippsburg | Sagadahoc | U | | 1 acre (0.40 ha) |
| 63-235 | The Brandies | | Isle au Haut | Knox | U | | 0.5 acres (0.20 ha) |
| 55-520 | The Brothers | | Cape Elizabeth | Cumberland | U | | 0.5 acres (0.20 ha) |
| 65-466 | The Cuckolds | | Southport | Lincoln | T | ME IF&W; home to The Cuckolds Lighthouse | 2 acres (0.81 ha) |
| 63-016 | The Downfall | | North Haven | Knox | T | ME IF&W | 3 acres (1.2 ha) |
| 63-048 | The Downfall | | North Haven | Knox | T | ME IF&W | 0.5 acres (0.20 ha) |
| 63-315 | The Graves | | Camden | Knox | U | | 0.5 acres (0.20 ha) |
| 79-296 | The Head | | Machiasport | Washington | R | | |
| 63-922 | The Hogshead | | Criehaven Twp. | Knox | U | | 0.5 acres (0.20 ha) |
| 59-220 | The Hub | | Mount Desert | Hancock | U | Uninhabited, spruce and hardwood forest and grassy meadows, bar connects to Long Porcupine Island, Acadia National Park | 8.7 acres (3.5 ha) |
| 59-124 | The Ledge | | Bar Harbor | Hancock | U | | 1 acre (0.40 ha) |
| 79-616 | The Sands | | Addison | Washington | U | | 0.5 acres (0.20 ha) |
| 79-615 | The Sands | | Addison | Washington | U | | 1 acre (0.40 ha) |
| 59-988 | The Shivers | | Stonington | Hancock | U | | 0.5 acres (0.20 ha) |
| 65-186 | Thief | | Bristol | Lincoln | T | ME IF&W | 2 acres (0.81 ha) |
| 59-742 | Third | | Blue Hill | Hancock | U | | 0.5 acres (0.20 ha) |
| 59-162 | Thomas | | Bar Harbor | Hancock | R | | |
| 65-407 | Thomas Great Toe | | Westport Island | Lincoln | U | | 0.5 acres (0.20 ha) |
| 65-406 | Thomas Little Toes | | Westport Island | Lincoln | R | | |
| (unnumbered) | Thompsons | | Trenton | Hancock | | Now serves as entrance to Acadia National Park, with information center | |
| 63-816 | Thompson's | | St. George | Knox | R | | |
| 63-814 | Thompson's | | St. George | Knox | R | | |
| 63-811 | Thompson's | | St. George | Knox | R | | |
| 79-052 | Thompson's Island | | Pembroke | Washington | U | | 2 acres (0.81 ha) |
| 73-067 | Thorne | | Woolwich | Sagadahoc | R | | |
| 65-255 | Thread Of Life Ledge | | South Bristol | Lincoln | R | | |
| 65-256 | Thread Of Life Ledge | | South Bristol | Lincoln | R | | |
| 65-257 | Thread Of Life Ledge | | South Bristol | Lincoln | R | | |
| 65-254 | Thread Of Life Ledge | | South Bristol | Lincoln | R | | |
| 59-980 | Three Bush | Scragg | Swan's Island | Hancock | R | | |
| 77-053 | Thrumbcap | | Islesboro | Waldo | R | | |
| 65-266 | Thrumbcap | | South Bristol | Lincoln | R | | |
| 65-267 | Thrumbcap (Southern) | | South Bristol | Lincoln | E | United States of America | |
| 59-990 | Thrumcap | | Stonington | Hancock | R | | |
| 59-203 | Thrumcap | | Gouldsboro | Hancock | R | | |
| 59-179 | Thrumcap | | Sorrento | Hancock | R | | |
| 59-669 | Thrumcap | | Brooksville | Hancock | T | ME IF&W | 1 acre (0.40 ha) |
| 55-407 | Thrumcap | | Harpswell | Cumberland | T | ME IF&W | 0.5 acres (0.20 ha) |
| 59-300 | Thrumcap | | Bar Harbor | Hancock | T | Uninhabited, bare rock just off Mount Desert Island, managed by Maine Inland & Fisheries Dept and US National Park Service, closed to visitors April 1 to July 31 to avoid disturbing nesting birds | 4 acres (1.6 ha) |
| 65-193 | Thrumcap | | Bristol | Lincoln | T | ME IF&W | 1.5 acres (0.61 ha) |
| 59-307 | Thrumcap (Isl Near) | | Mount Desert | Hancock | R | | |
| 65-258 | Thrumcap Ledge | | South Bristol | Lincoln | R | | |
| 59-306 | Thrumcap (Little) | | Mount Desert | Hancock | R | | |
| 65-130 | Thurston's | | Bristol | Lincoln | R | | |
| 65-131 | Thurston's | | Bristol | Lincoln | R | | |
| 65-354 | Tibbetts | | Boothbay | Lincoln | R | | |
| 65-240 | Tide (Half) | | South Bristol | Lincoln | R | | |
| 55-211 | Tide (High) | | Yarmouth | Cumberland | R | | |
| 81-035 | Timber | | Biddeford | York | R | | |
| 63-669 | Timber | | Friendship | Knox | R | | |
| 59-242 | Tinker | | Tremont | Hancock | R | | |
| 73-264 | Todd's Point | | Georgetown | Sagadahoc | T | Maine Bureau of Parks & Lands | 0.5 acres (0.20 ha) |
| 63-415 | Tomie's | | South Thomaston | Knox | R | | |
| 79-908 | Tommy | | Harrington | Washington | R | | |
| 79-934 | Tommy | | Harrington | Washington | U | | 1 acre (0.40 ha) |
| 79-639 | Tom's | | Addison | Washington | R | | |
| 79-610 | Tom's | | Addison | Washington | R | | |
| 63-603 | Tom's | Tommy's | St. George | Knox | R | | |
| 65-126 | Tom's Nubble | | South Bristol | Lincoln | R | | |
| 55-068 | Tondreau's | | Harpswell | Cumberland | R | | |
| 59-909 | Toothacher | | Deer Isle | Hancock | U | | 0.5 acres (0.20 ha) |
| 59-758 | Torrey (East) | | Brooklin | Hancock | R | | |
| 59-757 | Torrey (West) | | Brooklin | Hancock | R | | |
| 59-759 | Torrey Castle | | Brooklin | Hancock | U | | 0.5 acres (0.20 ha) |
| 79-911 | Trafton Ledge | | Harrington | Washington | U | | 0.5 acres (0.20 ha) |
| 79-909 | Trafton's | | Harrington | Washington | R | | |
| 79-910 | Trafton's | | Harrington | Washington | R | | |
| 59-163 | Trap Rock | | Trenton | Hancock | U | | 0.5 acres (0.20 ha) |
| 65-262 | Treasure | | Boothbay | Lincoln | R | | |
| 63-784 | Treasure | | St. George | Knox | R | | |
| 73-161 | Treasure | | West Bath | Sagadahoc | R | | |
| 73-162 | Treasure Ledge | | West Bath | Sagadahoc | R | | |
| 79-652 | Treasure/Devils | | Jonesport | Washington | U | | 1 acre (0.40 ha) |
| 79-115 | Treat's | | Eastport | Washington | R | | |
| 59-357 | Triangle | | Swan's Island | Hancock | U | | 0.5 acres (0.20 ha) |
| 81-112 | Trott | | Kennebunkport | York | R | | |
| 59-870 | Trumbcap | | Stonington | Hancock | R | | |
| 59-340 | Trumpet | | Tremont | Hancock | R | | |
| 77-070 | Tumbledown Dick | | Islesboro | Waldo | R | | |
| 65-434 | Tumbler | | Boothbay Harbor | Lincoln | R | | |
| 79-913 | Turkey | | Milbridge | Washington | R | | |
| 73-237 | Turnip | | Georgetown | Sagadahoc | R | | |
| 65-259 | Turnip | | South Bristol | Lincoln | R | | |
| 55-427 | Turnip | | Harpswell | Cumberland | R | | 1.9 acres (0.77 ha) |
| 63-282 | Turnip | | Isle au Haut | Knox | U | | 0.5 acres (0.20 ha) |
| 65-260 | Turnip | | South Bristol | Lincoln | U | | 0.5 acres (0.20 ha) |
| 65-099 | Turtle | | South Bristol | Lincoln | R | | |
| 59-065 | Turtle | | Winter Harbor | Hancock | R | Owned by The Nature Conservancy | 128.7 acres (52.1 ha) |
| 79-173 | Twin | | Edmunds Twp. | Washington | R | | |
| 59-160 | Twin (North) | North Twinnie | Bar Harbor | Hancock | R | Owned by U.S. Fish and Wildlife Service's Maine Coastal Islands National Wildlife Refuge | 2.5 acres (1.0 ha) |
| 59-161 | Twin (South) | South Twinnie | Bar Harbor | Hancock | R | Owned by Acadia National Park | |
| 65-364 | Two | | Westport Island | Lincoln | R | | |
| 63-653 | Two Bush | | Muscle Ridge Shoals Twp. | Knox | E | Exempt - Dept. of Interior (1895). Home to the Two Bush Island Light. | |
| 63-804 | Two Bush | | St. George | Knox | R | | |
| 63-901 | Two Bush | | Matinicus Isle Plt. | Knox | R | | |
| 63-902 | Two Bush | | Matinicus Isle Plt. | Knox | T | ME IF&W | 1 acre (0.40 ha) |
| 59-681 | Two Bush | | Deer Isle | Hancock | T | ME IF&W | 1 acre (0.40 ha) |
| 55-178 | Two Bush | | Harpswell | Cumberland | T | ME IF&W | 2 acres (0.81 ha) |
| 59-874 | Two Bush | | Stonington | Hancock | U | | 0.5 acres (0.20 ha) |
| 63-522 | Two Bush | | Vinalhaven | Knox | U | | 1 acre (0.40 ha) |
| 59-873 | Two Bush | | Stonington | Hancock | U | | 0.5 acres (0.20 ha) |
| 63-803 | Two Bush (Little) | | St. George | Knox | R | | |
| 63-652 | Two Bush (Little) | | Muscle Ridge Shoals Twp. | Knox | T | ME IF&W | 1.5 acres (0.61 ha) |
| 63-650 | Two Bush Reef | | Muscle Ridge Shoals Twp. | Knox | U | | 0.5 acres (0.20 ha) |
| 73-057 | Two Tree | | Woolwich | Sagadahoc | R | | |
| 65-366 | Tyler | | Westport Island | Lincoln | R | | |
| 65-368 | Tyler | | Westport Island | Lincoln | R | | |
| 65-369 | Tyler | | Westport Island | Lincoln | R | | |
| 55-115 | Uncle Zeke | | Harpswell | Cumberland | U | | 0.5 acres (0.20 ha) |
| 59-670 | Undercliff Point | | Brooksville | Hancock | R | | |
| 59-390 | Unknown | | Swan's Island | Hancock | U | | 0.5 acres (0.20 ha) |
| 79-234 | Unnamed | | Lubec | Washington | T | ME IF&W | 0.5 acres (0.20 ha) |
| 79-085 | Unnamed | | Edmunds Twp. | Washington | T | ME IF&W | 0.5 acres (0.20 ha) |
| 63-041 | Unnamed | | North Haven | Knox | U | | 0.5 acres (0.20 ha) |
| 55-275 | Upper Green | | Chebeague Island | Cumberland | T | ME IF&W | 1.2 acres (0.49 ha) |
| 55-297 | Upper Green | | Chebeague Island | Cumberland | T | ME IF&W | 0.6 acres (0.24 ha) |
| 65-402 | Upper Mark | | Boothbay | Lincoln | U | | 0.5 acres (0.20 ha) |
| 55-369 | Vaill | Marsh | Long Island | Cumberland | R | | 16 acres (6.5 ha) |
| 55-366 | Vaill | | Long Island | Cumberland | U | | 0.5 acres (0.20 ha) |
| 73-049 | Varney's | | Bath | Sagadahoc | R | | |
| 81-097 | Vaughn's | | Kennebunkport | York | R | | |
| 59-570 | Verona | | Verona Island | Hancock | E | Exempt - 4 or more structures | |
| 63-160 | Vinalhaven | | Vinalhaven | Knox | E | Former quarries provided stone for the Brooklyn Bridge; inhabited year round mostly by lobstermen, considerable summer rusticator population, a small public park at Lane Island | 16,000 acres (6,500 ha) |
| 79-498 | Virgin | | Jonesport | Washington | U | | 1 acre (0.40 ha) |
| 79-499 | Virgin's Breast | Nipple | Jonesport | Washington | R | | |
| 79-485 | Wallace Ledge | | Jonesport | Washington | U | | 0 acres (0 ha) |
| 63-676 | Walsgrover | | Friendship | Knox | E | Exempt — 4 or more residential structures | |
| 77-050 | Warren | | Islesboro | Waldo | E | State of Maine Parks and Recreation, state park for boaters since 1959, nine campsites and two lean-tos | 70 acres (28 ha) |
| 79-512 | Wass (Great) | | Beals | Washington | E | Bridged to mainland, island preserve owned by The Nature Conservancy | 1,540 acres (220 ha) |
| 79-671 | Water | | Jonesport | Washington | R | | |
| 73-127 | Webber | | Georgetown | Sagadahoc | R | | |
| 73-291 | Webber | | Phippsburg | Sagadahoc | R | | |
| 59-188 | Welch's | | Sorrento | Hancock | R | | |
| 59-591 | Wescott's | | Brooksville | Hancock | R | | |
| 73-239 | Western | | Georgetown | Sagadahoc | R | | |
| 59-042 | Western | | Gouldsboro | Hancock | R | | |
| 59-675 | Western | | State of Maine | Hancock | R | Private, summer cottage | |
| 63-058 | Western (Little) | | Vinalhaven | Knox | R | | |
| 65-201 | Western Egg Rock | | Bristol | Lincoln | R | | |
| 63-244 | Western Head | | Isle au Haut | Knox | R | | |
| 63-243 | Western Head | | Isle au Haut | Knox | R | | |
| 79-306 | Western Head | | Cutler | Washington | R | | |
| 65-350 | Westport | Jeremysquam | Westport Island | Lincoln | E | Bridged to the mainland, private, mostly year-round inhabitants | |
| 79-928 | Whale Ledge | | Milbridge | Washington | U | | 0.5 acres (0.20 ha) |
| 55-445 | Whale Rock | | Harpswell | Cumberland | T | ME IF&W | 1 acre (0.40 ha) |
| 63-520 | Whaleback | | Vinalhaven | Knox | U | | 0.5 acres (0.20 ha) |
| 55-587 | Whaleback | | Cape Elizabeth | Cumberland | U | | 2 acres (0.81 ha) |
| 73-281 | Whaleback | | Georgetown | Sagadahoc | U | | 0.5 acres (0.20 ha) |
| 55-288 | Whaleboat | Great | Harpswell | Cumberland | R | Whaleboat is the largest undeveloped island in the Casco Bay. The island has a meadow, a spruce forest, cobble beaches, and cliffs. Owned by the Maine Coast Heritage Trust, and is open to the public. | 122 acres (49 ha) |
| 55-279 | Whaleboat (Little) | | Harpswell | Cumberland | R | Located near Whaleboat Island, Little Whaleboat Island has a spruce-fir forest, rocky shores, and wildlife, including bald eagles and ospreys. Two campsites exist for visitors. Owned by the Maine Coast Heritage Trust and is open to the public. | |
| 55-280 | Whaleboat (Little) | | Harpswell | Cumberland | R | | |
| 55-281 | Whaleboat (Little) | | Harpswell | Cumberland | R | | |
| 55-278 | Whaleboat (Little) | | Harpswell | Cumberland | R | | |
| 55-284 | Whaleboat (Little) | | Harpswell | Cumberland | R | | |
| 55-282 | Whaleboat (Little) | | Harpswell | Cumberland | R | Privately owned | 18 acres (7.3 ha) |
| 55-277 | Whaleboat (Little) | | Harpswell | Cumberland | R | | |
| 55-283 | Whaleboat (Little) | | Harpswell | Cumberland | R | Privately owned | 4.3 acres (1.7 ha) |
| 55-287 | Whaleboat (Little) | | Harpswell | Cumberland | U | | 0.5 acres (0.20 ha) |
| 55-285 | Whaleboat (Little) | | Harpswell | Cumberland | U | | 0.5 acres (0.20 ha) |
| 55-286 | Whaleboat (Little) | | Harpswell | Cumberland | U | | 0.5 acres (0.20 ha) |
| 63-677 | Wharton | | Friendship | Knox | R | | |
| 63-268 | Wheat | | Isle au Haut | Knox | U | | 3.8 acres (1.5 ha) |
| 63-269 | Wheat Island Ledge | | Isle au Haut | Knox | U | | 0.5 acres (0.20 ha) |
| 63-905 | Wheaton | | Matinicus Isle Plt. | Knox | R | | |
| 63-914 | Wheaton | | Matinicus Isle Plt. | Knox | U | Seasonally inhabited, private, protects Matinicus Harbor | 2 acres (0.81 ha) |
| 63-906 | Wheaton Island Ledge | | Matinicus Isle Plt. | Knox | U | | 1 acre (0.40 ha) |
| 79-432 | Whichwood | | Addison | Washington | R | | |
| 59-908 | Whig | | Deer Isle | Hancock | R | | |
| 59-753 | Whisker | | Brooklin | Hancock | R | | |
| 65-278 | White | | Boothbay | Lincoln | R | | |
| 59-934 | White | | Deer Isle | Hancock | R | Private, two summer cottages | |
| 65-276 | White | | Boothbay | Lincoln | R | | |
| 81-167 | White | | Kittery | York | U | | 0.5 acres (0.20 ha) |
| 63-513 | White (Big) | | Vinalhaven | Knox | R | | |
| 63-514 | White (Little) | | Vinalhaven | Knox | R | | |
| 55-628 | White Bull | | Harpswell | Cumberland | T | ME IF&W | 5.5 acres (2.2 ha) |
| 63-293 | White Horse | | Isle au Haut | Knox | T | ME IF&W | 1.5 acres (0.61 ha) |
| 63-267 | White Ledge | | Isle au Haut | Knox | T | ME IF&W | 3 acres (1.2 ha) |
| 63-298 | White Ledge | | Isle au Haut | Knox | T | ME IF&W | 2 acres (0.81 ha) |
| 55-081 | White Point | | Harpswell | Cumberland | R | | |
| 63-554 | Whitehead | | St. George | Knox | E | Private, once hosted both lighthouse and lifesaving station, year-round habitation ended in 1982 when light was automated | 70 acres (28 ha) |
| 55-099 | White's | | Harpswell | Cumberland | R | | |
| 65-340 | White's | | Wiscasset | Lincoln | R | | |
| 65-412 | Whittum | | Westport Island | Lincoln | R | | |
| 63-742 | Whortleberry | | Cushing | Knox | R | | |
| 81-178 | Whortleberry | | Kittery | York | R | | |
| 63-042 | Widow | | Vinalhaven | Knox | R | Private, formerly a summer retreat for the "convalescent insane" | |
| 79-081 | Wilbur Neck | | Pembroke | Washington | R | | |
| 79-795 | Willard Point | | Harrington | Washington | U | | 0.5 acres (0.20 ha) |
| 73-145 | Williams | | West Bath | Sagadahoc | R | | |
| 55-056 | Williams | Sheldon | Harpswell | Cumberland | R | | |
| 79-065 | Williams | | Edmunds Twp. | Washington | R | | |
| 79-066 | Williams | | Edmunds Twp. | Washington | R | | |
| 55-295 | William's | | Freeport | Cumberland | R | Privately owned, with conservation organization | 21.4 acres (8.7 ha) |
| 55-296 | Williams Island Ledge | | Freeport | Cumberland | U | | 0.5 acres (0.20 ha) |
| 59-705 | Willow Ledge | | Deer Isle | Hancock | R | | |
| 73-159 | Winship | | Georgetown | Sagadahoc | R | | |
| 59-580 | Winslow | | Penobscot | Hancock | R | | |
| 65-222 | Witch | | South Bristol | Lincoln | R | | |
| 73-283 | Wood | | Phippsburg | Sagadahoc | R | | |
| 73-073 | Wood | | Bath | Sagadahoc | R | | |
| 59-586 | Wood | | Penobscot | Hancock | R | | |
| 81-015 | Wood | | Biddeford | York | R | Home to the Wood Island Light | |
| 73-258 | Wood | | Georgetown | Sagadahoc | R | | |
| 73-293 | Wood | | Phippsburg | Sagadahoc | R | | |
| 81-166 | Wood | | Kittery | York | R | Owned by the Town of Kittery. | |
| 73-292 | Wood (Little) | | Phippsburg | Sagadahoc | E | Exempt — 4 or more residential structures | |
| 59-585 | Wood Island Ledge | | Penobscot | Hancock | R | | |
| 73-297 | Wood Island Ledge | | Phippsburg | Sagadahoc | U | | 0.5 acres (0.20 ha) |
| 65-014 | Woodbridge | | Newcastle | Lincoln | R | | |
| 63-917 | Wooden Ball | | Matinicus Isle Plt. | Knox | R | | |
| 63-918 | Wooden Ball | | Matinicus Isle Plt. | Knox | R | | |
| 63-919 | Wooden Ball | | Matinicus Isle Plt. | Knox | R | Privately owned, largely pasture | |
| 55-050 | Woodsy | | Harpswell | Cumberland | R | | |
| 59-898 | Wreck | | Stonington | Hancock | R | Private, uninhabited, acquired by The Nature Conservancy in the 1960s, reverting to wild | |
| 65-194 | Wreck | | Bristol | Lincoln | T | ME IF&W | 10 acres (4.0 ha) |
| 65-192 | Wreck Island Ledge | | Bristol | Lincoln | T | ME IF&W | 1.5 acres (0.61 ha) |
| 65-191 | Wreck Island Ledge | | Bristol | Lincoln | T | ME IF&W | 1.5 acres (0.61 ha) |
| 55-123 | Wyer | | Harpswell | Cumberland | R | | |
| 55-125 | Yarmouth | | Harpswell | Cumberland | R | | |
| 55-126 | Yarmouth | | Harpswell | Cumberland | U | | 1 acre (0.40 ha) |
| 59-181 | Yellow | | Winter Harbor | Hancock | R | Private, summer cottage, pink granite quarried on the island | |
| 63-184 | Yellow | | Vinalhaven | Knox | U | | 0.5 acres (0.20 ha) |
| 63-629 | Yellow Ledge | | Muscle Ridge Shoals Twp. | Knox | T | ME IF&W | 1 acre (0.40 ha) |
| 59-472 | Yellow Ld. | | Swan's Island | Hancock | U | | 0.5 acres (0.20 ha) |
| 59-367 | Yellow Ledge | | Swan's Island | Hancock | R | | |
| 63-640 | Yellow Ridge | | St. George | Knox | T | ME IF&W | 0.1 acres (0.040 ha) |
| 55-609 | Yellow Rock | | Harpswell | Cumberland | U | | 0.5 acres (0.20 ha) |
| 79-294 | Yellowhead | | Machiasport | Washington | R | | |
| 79-290 | Yellowhead | | Machiasport | Washington | R | | |
| 63-280 | York | | Isle au Haut | Knox | R | Private, inhabited summers | |
| 63-277 | York Ledge | | Isle au Haut | Knox | U | | 0.5 acres (0.20 ha) |
| 63-274 | York Ledge | | Isle au Haut | Knox | U | | 0.5 acres (0.20 ha) |
| 63-275 | York Ledge | | Isle au Haut | Knox | U | | 0.5 acres (0.20 ha) |
| 59-588 | Young's | | Penobscot | Hancock | R | | |
| 59-088 | Young's | | Hancock | Hancock | R | | |
| 63-899 | Zephyr Ledges | | Matinicus Isle Plt. | Knox | U | | 0.5 acres (0.20 ha) |

== See also ==
- Maine Coastal Islands National Wildlife Refuge
- Maine Island Trail
