= Narraguagus Jr/Sr High School =

Location
- 1611 Main Street; Harrington, Maine 04643; United States
- Coordinates: 44°37′12″N 67°50′30″W

Information
- Opened: 1968
- School district: MSAD 37
- Principal: Todd Emerson
- Grades: 7–12
- Enrollment: 319 (2023-2024)
- Campus size: Small
- Campus type: Rural
- Colors: Maroon and white
- Athletics conference: Down East Athletic Conference; Penobscot Valley Conference
- Team name: Knights and Lady Knights
- Rival: Jonesport-Beals High School
- Accreditation: New England Association of Schools and Colleges
- Yearbook: Squire
- Website: www.nhsknights.org

Narraguagus Jr/Sr High School is a regional secondary school in Harrington, Maine, United States providing education to the communities of Addison, Cherryfield, Columbia, Columbia Falls, Harrington, and Milbridge. The school is operated by Maine School Administrative District 37 and is named for the Narraguagus River, which flows through the towns of Cherryfield and Milbridge.

The school has 300 students in grades 7–12. The school is 96.4% white, and 3.6% other ethnicities as of a 2005 census. There are six special education teachers, and 24 other teachers, creating an average of 12 students per teacher.

== Academics ==
Narraguagus offers a variety of courses focusing on college preparation, vocational education and career technology.

Courses

- Advanced Placement: English, Statistics, U.S. History
- Honors: English, Algebra I & II, Geometry, Calculus, Chemistry, Physics, Women Writers
- Vocational & Career Technology: Auto & Diesel Technology, Building Trades, Criminal Justice, Culinary Arts, Entrepreneurship, Marine Technology, Marketing, Microsoft for Business

== Athletics ==
Narraguagus is a member of the Maine Principals' Association.

Boys

- Baseball
- Basketball
- Cross Country
- Golf
- Soccer
- Track & Field
- Drama
- Cheerleading

Girls

- Basketball
- Cross Country
- Golf
- Soccer
- Softball
- Track & Field
- Volleyball
- Drama
- Cheerleading

== Notable alumni ==
- Katie Aselton (Miss Maine Teen USA, actress)
