= Crowley Island =

Island in Washington County, Maine, United States

Moose Island
- Location within Maine Location within the United States

Geography
- Coordinates: 44.5495226°N 67.6549949°W
- Adjacent to: West River, Indian River
- Area: 183 acres (74 ha)
- Highest elevation: 23 ft (7 m)

Administration
- United States
- State: Maine
- County: Washington

Crowley Island is an island between the West River and the Indian River in Addison, Washington County, Maine. Crowley Island is connected to the mainland by a bridge and Crowley Island Road. There is also a cemetery on the island. Steele Point is located on the south west tip of the island.
