= Wreaths Across America =

American non-profit organization

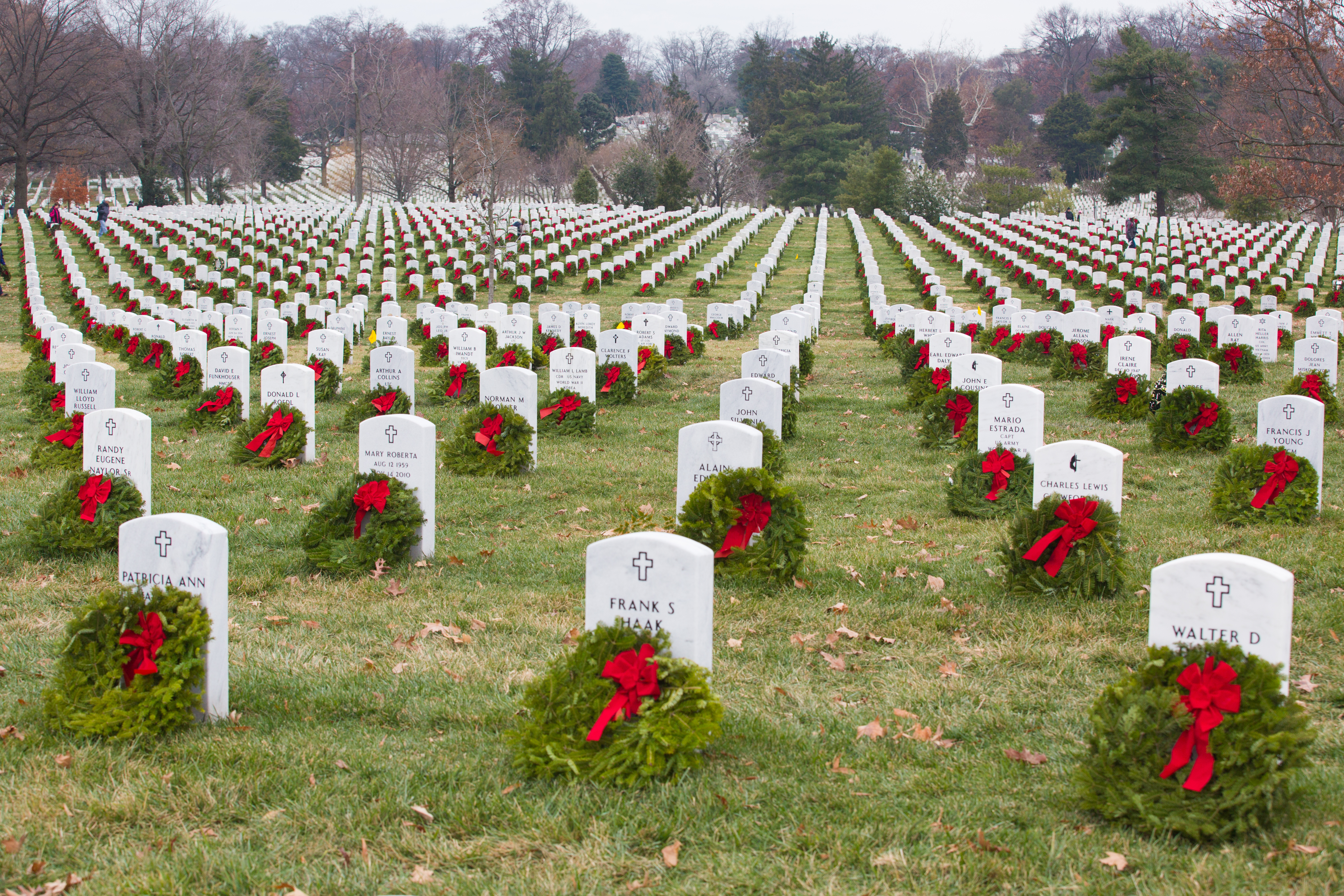
Wreaths at Arlington National Cemetery supplied by Wreaths Across America in 2013

Wreaths Across America (WAA) is an American nonprofit organization established in 2007 by wreath producer Morrill Worcester, assisted by veterans and truckers. Its primary activity is distributing wreaths for placement on veterans' graves in military cemeteries. In December 2008, the United States Senate agreed to a resolution that designated December 13, 2008, as Wreaths Across America Day. Subsequent national Wreaths Across America days have been designated on the second or third Saturday of December.

== History ==
In 1992, the Worcester Wreath company in Harrington, Maine, had a surplus at the end of the Christmas holiday season. Recalling a boyhood trip to Arlington National Cemetery in Virginia, company founder Morrill Worcester donated to the cemetery 5,000 wreaths to honor the cemetery's dead, with the help of volunteers and a local trucking company. After thirteen years of similar donations, in 2005 a photo of snowy gravestones covered with wreaths at the cemetery received widespread circulation on the internet. Thousands of people called Worcester, wanting to replicate the wreath-laying service at their own veteran cemeteries.

At the end of 2006, Worcester's company supplied wreaths to over 230 state and national cemeteries and veterans monuments across the country. Over 150 different locations simultaneously held ceremonies with Arlington's. Additionally, the project had its first "Veterans Honor Parade" with "Patriot Guard Riders" who escorted the wreaths from Maine to the cemetery. The parade, which is held each year, now visits schools, monuments, veterans' homes and communities along its route.

=== Activities ===
In 2014, volunteers placed over 700,000 memorial wreaths at 1,000 locations in the United States and overseas, including the USS Arizona Memorial at Pearl Harbor, Bunker Hill, Valley Forge, and the National September 11 Memorial at the World Trade Center site in New York City. During that year, volunteers were able to place wreaths in all sections of Arlington Cemetery for the first time. In 2016, this number increased to 1.2 million wreaths being placed at more than 1,230 cemeteries across the nation.

=== Conflicts of interest ===
Conflict of interest charges have been made against WAA because this charity has an exclusive for-profit supplier, Worcester Wreath Company, also run by the Morrill family in the same town. The charity's purchases of wreaths from this company account for most of the company's revenue and profits. In late 2015, The Wall Street Journal reported serious conflicts of interest with potential malfeasance in governance and contracting. In 2015 alone, the Journal reported profits of over $1 million on sales of over 850,000 wreaths to the charity raising concerns about competitive bidding, reporting that several competitors had asked to bid significantly below the price offered by Worcester Wreath company but were denied access. In 2016, Wreaths Across America, implemented a request for proposal process for the provision of wreaths which is managed by the board of directors. In 2023, the organization stated that conflicts of interest are addressed by having an outside agency manage the entire RFP process.

In 2024, 76% of WAA's program-related expenses went directly to Worcester Wreaths.

As of December 2025, CharityWatch rated Wreaths Across America with a question mark and noted governance concerns. The Better Business Bureau's page for WAA said it had not disclosed documents the BBB requires for a charity to be listed.

== Flagpole of Freedom Park proposal ==
In early 2022, Morrill Worcester announced a proposed Flagpole of Freedom Park to be located on 2,500 acres (1,000 ha) of his family's land in Columbia Falls in Downeast Maine.

The centerpiece flagpole had a planned height of 1,461 feet (445 m), slightly taller than the Empire State Building, and including the hill below it would have risen to 1,776 feet (541 m) above sea level (a reference to 1776, the year of the U.S.'s declaration of independence), with two observation decks, one at the top. LeMessurier Consultants had been tasked with designing the structure. The size of the flag had been described as the size of one and a half American football fields.

The park was also slated to include 55 individual remembrance-wall parks carved with the names of every military veteran in US. history. The entry to the park was to be a faux-historical village known as Village of Old Glory, with museums, restaurants, shops, hotels and a live event venue.

Morrill Worcester's son Mike said that the for-profit park would not seek government funding and hopes to obtain private funding.
