= Bucknam House =

Historic house in Maine, United States

- U.S. National Register of Historic Places
- Location within Maine Location within the United States
- Location: Main St., Columbia Falls, Maine, United States
- Coordinates: 44°39′15″N 67°43′33″W
- Area: 1 acre (0.40 ha)
- Built: 1792
- Built by: Bucknam, John
- NRHP reference No.: 75000113
- Added to NRHP: April 28, 1975

The Bucknam House is a historic house on Main Street in the village center of Columbia Falls, Maine, United States. Built in 1792 by one of area's first settlers, it is a well-preserved example of late Georgian architecture. It was listed on the National Register of Historic Places in 1975.

== Description and history ==
The Bucknam House is located on the north side of Main Street, facing south toward the Pleasant River. It is a 2 1/2-story wood-frame structure, five bays wide, with a side-gable roof, large central chimney, clapboard siding, and a granite foundation. Exterior styling is minimal, with simple cornerboards, and a simple entrance surround with crude pilasters and a pedimented entablature. The interior follows a typical central-chimney plan, with a narrow entrance vestibule with a winding staircase to the second floor, public rooms on either side of the chimney, and the kitchen extending across the central part of the rear with small rooms on either side. Interior woodwork is largely original and in good condition.

The house was built in 1792 by John Bucknam, who arrived in the area in the 1760s, and was one of its first settlers. Bucknam exploited the area's extensive timber resources, building a sawmill and expanding the small settlement. He also served in the local militia during the American Revolutionary War, mustering for duty in 1777 and 1779. He died, at age 46, not long after building this house. The house is a comparatively large and sophisticated building for such a remote setting.

== See also ==
- Samuel Bucknam House, built by John Bucknam's grandson
