= Western Little River =

Location
- Country: United States

Physical characteristics
- Source
  - location: Maine
- Mouth
  - location: Pleasant River
  - coordinates: 44°41′50″N 67°46′36″W
  - elevation: 60 feet (20 m)
- Length: 11 miles (18 km)

Basin features
- Progression: Pleasant River — Pleasant Bay

The Western Little River, or the Northwest Branch, is a tributary of the Pleasant River in Washington County, Maine. From its source (44°46′59″N 67°50′18″W) in Maine Township 18, MD, BPP, the river runs 11.2 miles (18.0 km) southeast and south to its confluence with the Pleasant River, at Little River Corner in Columbia.

== See also ==
- List of rivers of Maine
