= Mill River (Harrington Bay) =

Location
- Country: United States

Physical characteristics
- Source
  - location: Maine
- Mouth
  - location: Harrington Bay
  - coordinates: 44°33′43″N 67°48′50″W
  - elevation: sea level
- Length: 8 mi (13 km)

The Mill River is a short river in Washington County, Maine. From its source (44°37′13″N 67°54′51″W) in Cherryfield, the river runs 7.8 miles (12.6 km) southeast to Flat Bay and its confluence with the Harrington River. Its lower length forms the border between the towns of Milbridge and Harrington.

== See also ==
- List of rivers of Maine
