= West Branch Pleasant River (Addison, Maine) =

Location
- Country: United States

Physical characteristics
- Source
  - location: Maine
- Mouth
  - location: Pleasant River
  - coordinates: 44°37′03″N 67°44′42″W
  - elevation: 3 feet (1 m)
- Length: 2 miles (3 km)

The West Branch Pleasant River is a tributary of the Pleasant River in Washington County, Maine. From the confluence of Branch Brook and Bells Brook (44°37′57″N 67°45′20″W) in southeast Columbia, the river meanders 2.3 miles (3.7 km) south to the estuary of the Pleasant River at Addison.

== See also ==
- List of rivers of Maine
