= West River (Maine) =

Location
- Country: United States

Physical characteristics
- Source
  - location: Maine
- Mouth
  - location: Wohoa Bay
  - coordinates: 44°32′10″N 67°40′01″W
  - elevation: sea level

The West River is a short river in Addison, Maine. From its source (44°35′22″N 67°40′48″W), the river runs about 5 miles (8 km) to its confluence with the Indian River at the head of Wohoa Bay.

== See also ==
- List of rivers of Maine
