= George Washington Museum of American History =

Proposed replica of Mount Vernon and museum in Utah

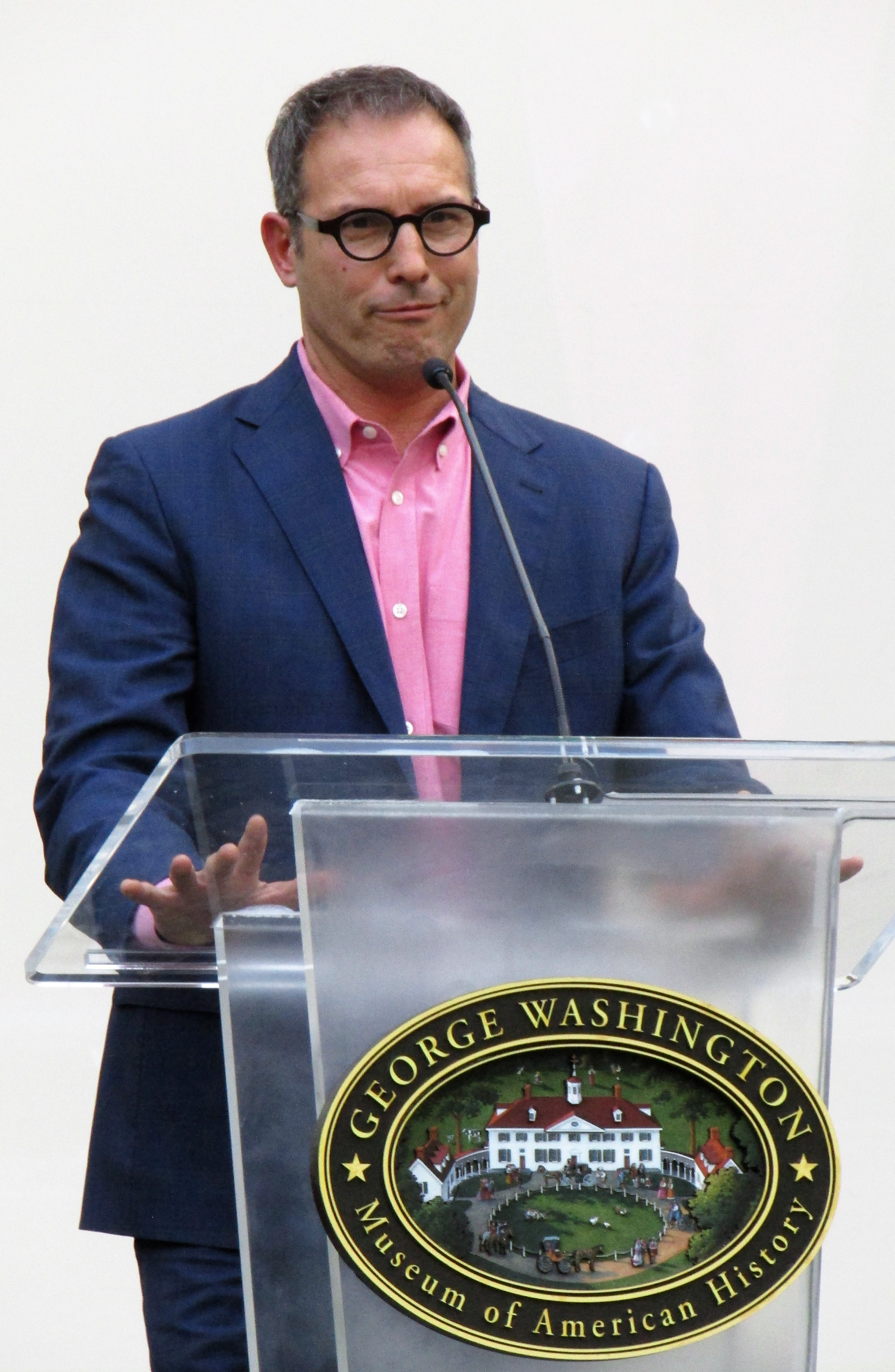
Founder Eric Dowdle speaking at the museum's announcement ceremony

The George Washington Museum of American History was a proposed replica of Mount Vernon and museum in Utah to be opened for the United States Semiquincentennial.

== Proposal ==
In early 2018, Rod Mann, mayor of Highland, Utah, met with the proponents of the idea, which would comprise 15 to 20 acres, for a cost of $53 million and "would not be funded by the City and would be self-sustaining."

On Thursday, June 6, 2018, attempting to become the "first state to follow through on the initiative" of "[finding] ways to mark the [Semiquincentennial]," the proposed George Washington Museum of American History was officially announced and set to open by the Semiquincentennial. Founded by folk artist Eric Dowdle, who has commented that "the point of the museum is to make Americans more hopeful for the future," the museum will include exhibits curated by former federal special agent and author Tim Ballard, who serves as chief historian. Paul Cardall, the museum's chief composer, has stated that "the Founding Fathers are often criticized in modern times and he hope[d] the new museum will change that narrative," as well as displaying "the positive sides of America's founders." Ballard considered its creation imperative, stating in hypophora "[t]here are domestic issues, foreign issues and our freedoms are constantly being threatened. How do we preserve our freedom? You go back to history and learn from history." Joining the founders in their announcement at the United States Capitol were Utah senators Mike Lee, who had akined it to a "Disneyland in Utah," and Orrin Hatch, the latter of whom considered Utah "the most patriotic state in the Union," former Salt Lake Chamber President Lane Beattie and former state senator Alvin B. Jackson. In addition, the plan was allegedly outlined to the head of the USA250 Commission.

The museum would first consist of a touring exhibition that would travel to all 50 states before its inauguration on a 18-acre location, becoming "the largest American history museum west of the Mississippi," which would consist of a replica of George Washington's Mount Vernon, as well as other structures on the site. The planned $70 million project whose location had not been determined as there were "other cities vying to host," such as This Is the Place Heritage Park and Thanksgiving Point, yet was rumored that might be established in Highland, "would have a working farm, some 40,000 square feet of exhibit space and a restaurant called, "Martha Washington's Kitchen," after America's first first lady," however it had not determined if it "would include the slave quarters that are now part of the tour at the original site." They founders planned to fundraise "hundreds of millions" through private donations, yet the IRS website did not list them as a nonprofit.

External videos
- New 'George Washington' Museum Coming to Utah on Facebook

The traveling exhibit would consist of fifty of the planned "250 pieces representing the greatest moments of American history," which would be named "Land That I Love" and set on its journey during 2025. The idea of build a replica was born when Dowdle visited Mount Vernon decades prior, and the overall purpose of placing it in Utah would be to bring experiences in the East Coast as well as increase museum diversity to the West Coast.

The following July, the museum held an event for artists, historians, technologists and community members in Lindon, Utah, to increase their involvement in planning. PilmerPR, a public relations firm, was recognized as a finalist by the Utah chapter of the Public Relations Society of America at its annual Golden Spike Awards for its efforts for the museum.

After July 2018, no further actions were taken, and as of April 2022, no further progress has been announced.

== See also ==
- George Washington Memorial Building, a failed project in Washington, D.C., in the early 20th century
- United States Semiquincentennial, the 250th anniversary of the United States Declaration of Independence
- Flagpole of Freedom Park, a failed multi-use complex in Maine for the United States Semiquincentennial
