= Union Church (Columbia Falls, Maine) =

Historic church in Maine, United States

- (Former) Union Church
- U.S. National Register of Historic Places
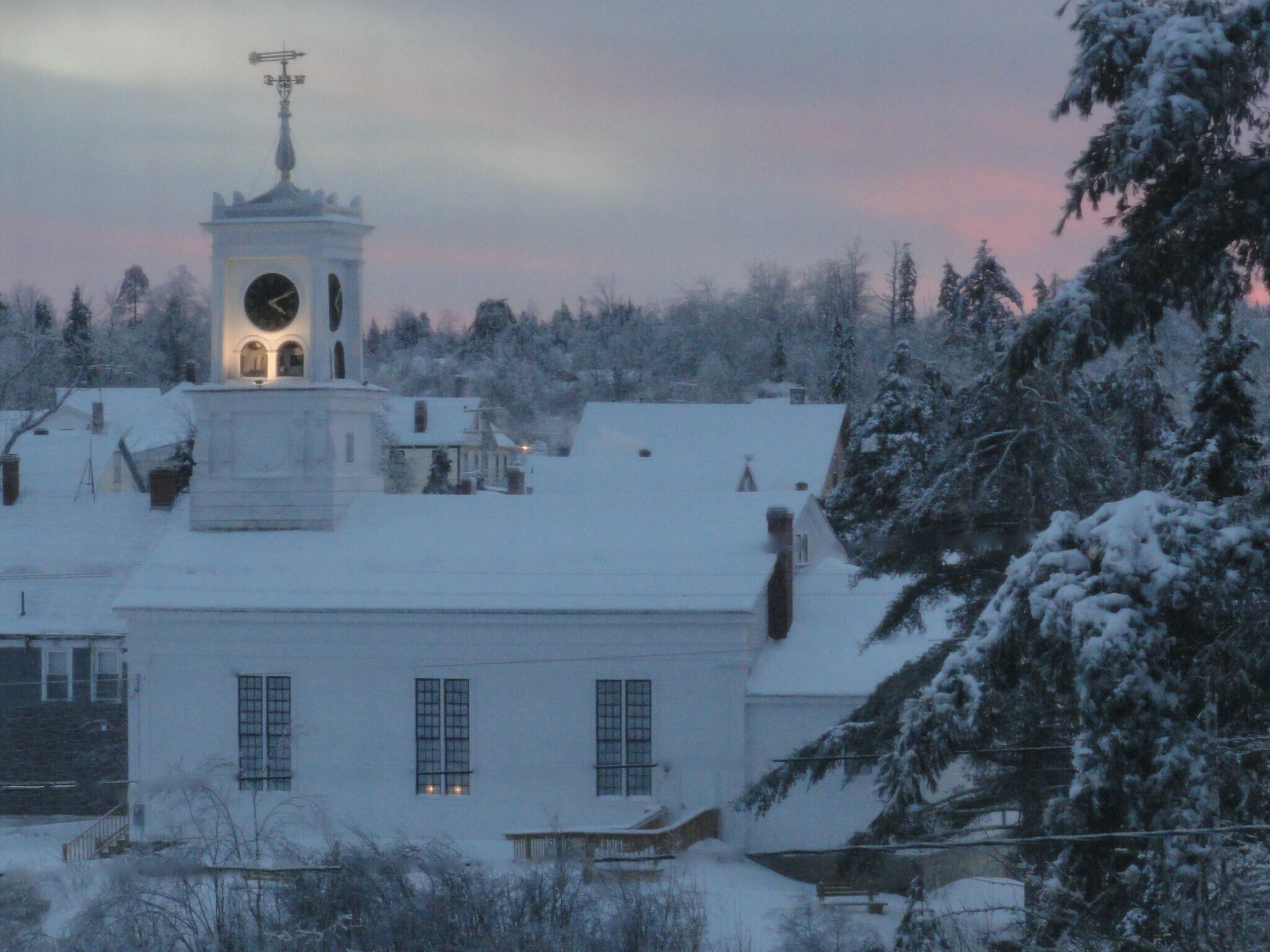

- Location within Maine Location within the United States
- Location: Main St., 0.1 mi NE of jct. with Addison Rd., Columbia Falls, Maine
- Coordinates: 44°39′12″N 67°43′46″W
- Built: 1840
- Architectural style: Greek Revival
- NRHP reference No.: 00000759
- Added to NRHP: July 05, 2000

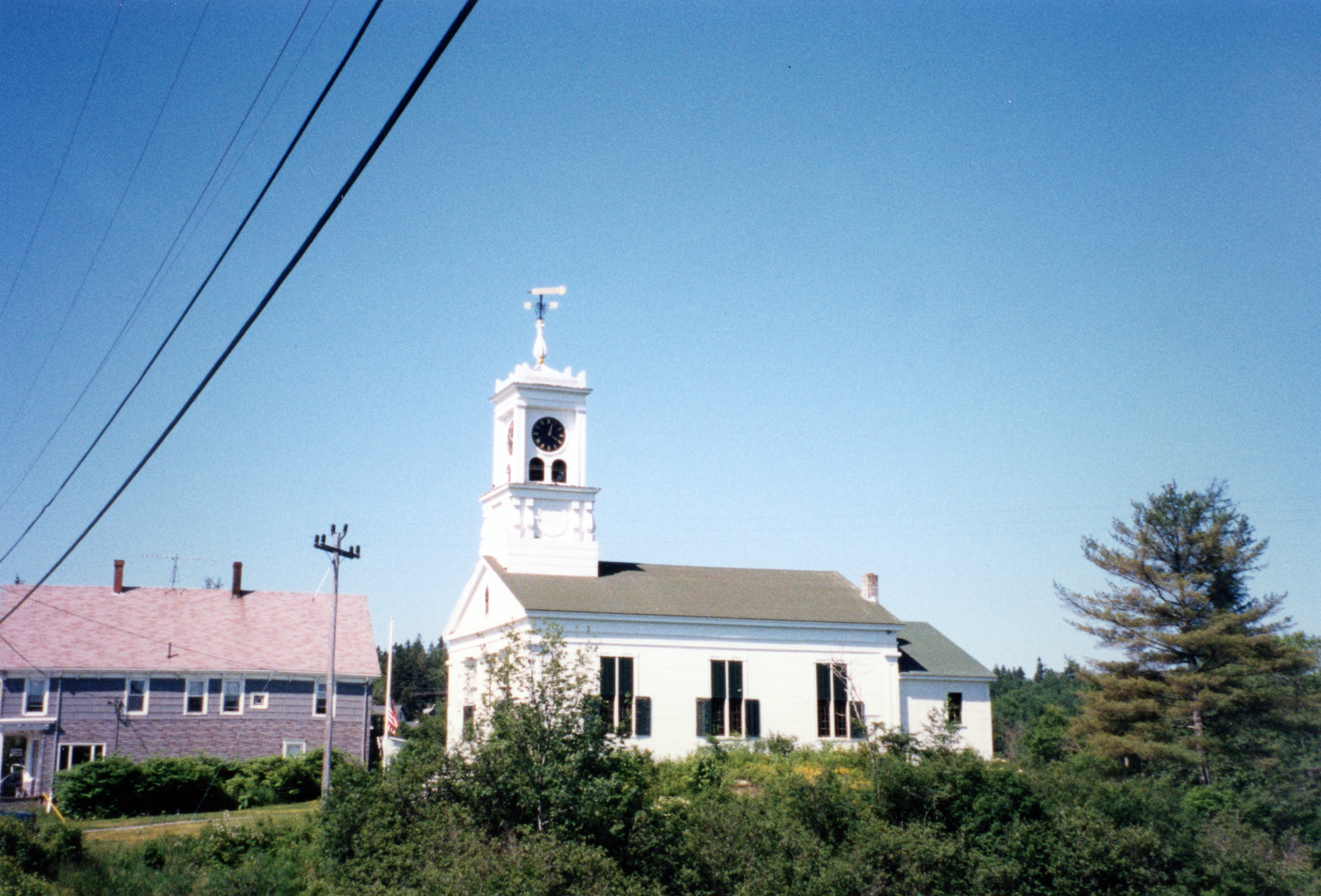

The former Union Church is a historic building on Main Street in Columbia Falls, Maine. Built in 1849, it is an important local example of Greek Revival architecture. It served as a church until 1902, and as town hall until 1987. In the 1940s its interior was also adapted for use as a gymnasium. The building now houses the town library and archives. On July 5, 2000, it was added to the National Register of Historic Places.

== Description and history ==
The former Union Church stands in the village center of Columbia Falls, on the north side of Main Street, between Addison Street and the Pleasant River. It is a tall single-story wood frame structure, with a gabled roof and a granite foundation. Its front facade is finished in matchboard, while the other sides are clapboarded. The building corners are pilastered, with an entablature extending across the top of the front and sides. The front has a centered entrance set in a three-bay recess with two tall Doric columns in front, and tall sash windows in the flanking bays, with pilasters at the corners of the recess. The gable above is fully pedimented, with a small arched louver at the center. A tower rises above, with a combination belfry and clock stage topped by a low crown and weathervane. The interior is largely the product of the buildings 1949-50 conversion into gymnasium, although some original Greek Revival window framing remains.

The early history of the church is shrouded in mystery; it was dedicated in January 1841, and its designer and builder are not known. The bell in the tower is original, and the clock was added in 1889. Use of the building for religious purposes had declined by the early 20th century to the point that it was deeded to the town, apparently with the stipulation that its exterior remain unaltered. It served as the community's town hall until 1987, and was further adapted for use as a gymnasium by the local schools in 1949-50. These functions were moved to a modern facility in 1987. The building has since housed the town library and archives.

== See also ==
- National Register of Historic Places listings in Washington County, Maine
- Union Church (disambiguation)
