= Narraguagus Bay =

Bay on the east coast of North America

Coordinates: 44°31′N 67°50′W

Narraguagus Bay (/ˌnæɹəˈɡweɪgəs/) is a bay in Washington County, Maine.

Located at the mouth of the Narraguagus River between the towns of Harrington and Milbridge, it is separated from Harrington Bay to the northeast by Fastet Island and Pleasant Bay to the east by Dyer Island.

The bay extends roughly 4.5 mi. (7 km) and is 2 mi. (3 km) at its widest.

There is a lighthouse (built 1853, discontinued 1934).
