= Capt. John Plummer House =

Historic house in Maine, United States

- U.S. National Register of Historic Places
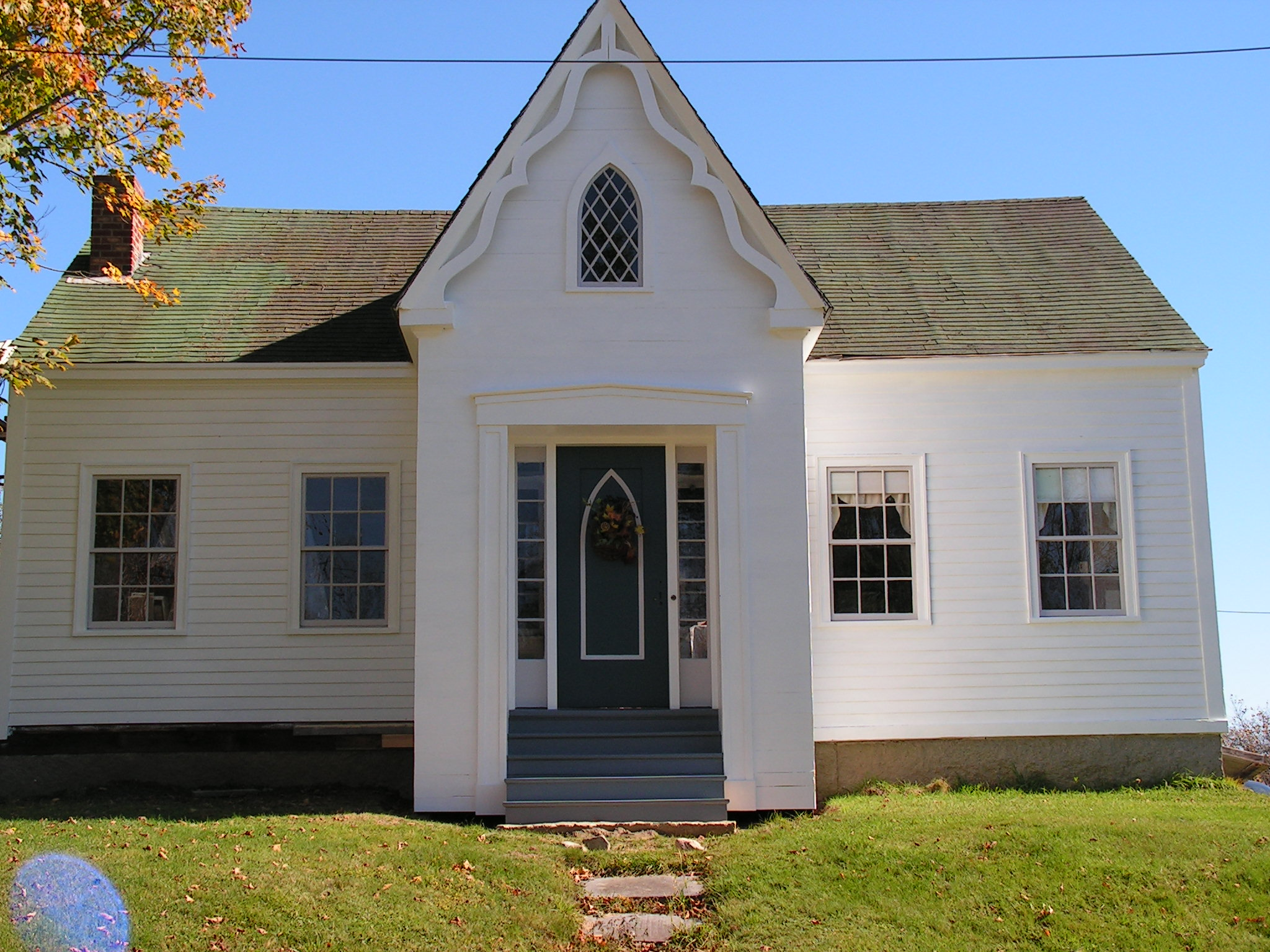

- Location within Maine Location within the United States
- Location: 23 Pleasant St., Addison, Maine
- Coordinates: 44°37′8″N 67°44′37″W
- Area: 1 acre (0.40 ha)
- Built: 1842
- Architectural style: Greek Revival, Gothic Revival
- NRHP reference No.: 08001358
- Added to NRHP: January 21, 2009

The Captain John Plummer House is a historic house at 23 Pleasant Street in Addison, Maine. Built in 1842 for a ship's captain and local politician, it is locally distinctive for its Gothic Revival entry vestibule, an architectural style not found elsewhere in the small community. The house was listed on the National Register of Historic Places in 2009.

== Description and history ==
The Plummer House stands in the village of Addison Point, located in the northwestern part of the rural community on the banks of the Pleasant River. It is set on the east side of Pleasant Street, a short road between Water and School Streets. It consists of a 1 1/2-story Cape style main block, with a two-story ell extending to the rear. The exterior is clad in a combination of clapboards and shingles, and most of the building rests on stone foundations. The most prominent feature of the house is its vestibule, which projects from the center of the five-bay front facade. It has a tall, steeply pitched gable roof, with decorative bargeboard in the gable, which has a lancet-arched tracery window at its center. An open arch shelters stairs that rise to the front door, which also features a lancet-arch window, and is flanked by sidelight windows. The interior of the house retains significant early original features, including wide pine flooring and woodwork in its front parlors.

The house was built about 1842 for John Plummer, an Addison native and ship's captain, who later engaged in merchant business, lumbering, and politics, serving in the state senate during the American Civil War. It is unclear exactly when the Gothic Revival vestibule was added; it may have been around the time Plummer became politically active. The house remained in the Plummer family until about the turn of the 20th century.

== See also ==
- National Register of Historic Places listings in Washington County, Maine
