= Columbia Falls =

Columbia Falls is the name of several places in the United States:

- Columbia Falls, Maine
- Columbia Falls, Montana
- Celilo Falls on the Oregon-Washington border, also known as "Columbia Falls"
