= Southwest Branch Indian River =

Location
- Country: United States

Physical characteristics
- Source
  - location: Maine
- Mouth
  - location: Indian River
  - coordinates: 44°37′15″N 67°38′46″W
  - elevation: 35 feet (11 m)
- Length: about 3 miles (5 km)

The Southwest Branch Indian River is a short stream in Addison, Maine. From its source (44°37′23″N 67°41′29″W), the river runs about 3 miles (5 km) east to its confluence with the Indian River.

== See also ==
- List of rivers of Maine
