= Dowdle =

Surname

Dowdle is a surname. It may refer to:

- Eric Dowdle, American folk artist
- James Dowdle (1840–1900), English Salvation Army officer
- John Erick Dowdle (born 1972), American film director and screenwriter
- Kate Embry Dowdle (1871–1954), American historian and clubwoman
- Lance Dowdle, lead guitarist for the band From Ashes to New
- Mick Dowdle (born 1947), Australian rules footballer
- Mike Dowdle (1937–1993), American football player
- Rico Dowdle (born 1998), American football player
- Walter Dowdle (1930–2025), American microbiologist
