= Jonesport-Beals High School =

Location
- 180 Snare Creek Road; Jonesport, Maine 04649; United States
- Coordinates: 44°33′22″N 67°36′52″W

Information
- School district: Union #103
- Principal: Joseph Swain
- Teaching staff: 8.00 (FTE)
- Grades: 9–12
- Student to teacher ratio: 7.25
- Campus size: Small
- Campus type: Rural
- Color
- Athletics conference: Down East Athletic Conference
- Team name: Royals
- Rival: Narraguagus High School
- Accreditation: New England Association of Schools and Colleges
- Website: https://www.union103.org/

Jonesport-Beals High School is a public high school in Jonesport, Maine in eastern Washington County in the United States. Students who attend the high school come from both Jonesport and Beals, Maine. The high school has approximately 100 enrolled students from grades 9–12 and is part of the Union #103 & Moosabec Community School District.
