= Wohoa Bay =

Bay on the coast of Washington County, Maine, US

Coordinates: 44°31′20″N 67°41′00″W

Wohoa Bay is a bay on the coast of Washington County, Maine, into which drains both West River and Indian River. It is located between the towns of Addison and Jonesport. It features a coastal plateau bog ecosystem not found anywhere else in North America, where eelgrass beds and mudflats provide habitat for a number of winged and finned species, as well as shellfish. Surrounding the marsh at a slightly higher elevation are such species as deerhair sedge and black crowberry, which provides a home for the rare crowberry blue butterfly to lay its larvae. There are bald eagles and ospreys and numerous other birds.

The bay is home to a number of islands, including Chandler Island, a privately owned island of approximately 1 acre in area.
