= Columbia House (disambiguation) =

Columbia House may refer to:

- Columbia House, a music and video club
- Columbia House (Columbia Falls, Maine), listed on the NRHP in Maine
- An English translation of Columbia-Haus, the former name of Columbia concentration camp
