= Great Wass Island =

Island in Washington County, Maine, United States

Coordinates: 44°28′39″N 67°35′6″W

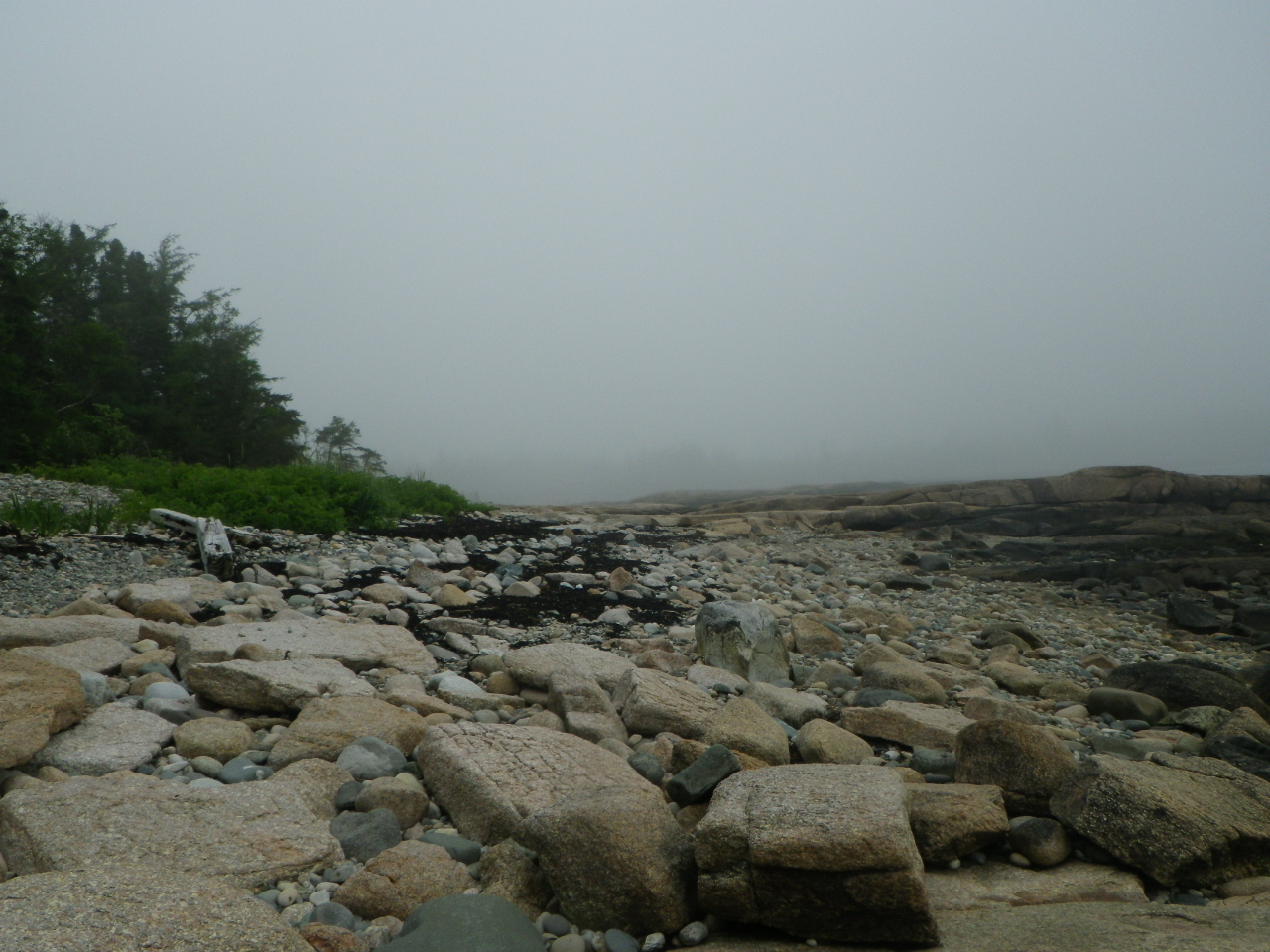
View of the east shore of Great Wass Island

Great Wass Island (approx. 1700 acres) lies in the Atlantic Ocean off the coast of the State of Maine, United States. On the mainland is Jonesport in Washington County. The island is 5 mi (8 km) long, 1.5 mi (2.5 km) wide and it is the biggest island in the Great Wass Archipelago, which contains over 43 islands extending off the coast from Jonesport. Great Wass Island is connected with a bridge to Beals Island, which is then connected to the mainland. Head Harbor Island and Steels Harbor Island lie close to the east. The 1,450-acre (5.9 km^{2}) Great Wass Island Preserve is in the island. The interior of Great Wass Island supports coastal Maine's largest stand of jack pine, other typical plants are bakeapple (Rubus chamaemorus), deer-hair sedge (Trichophorum cespitosum), and dragon's mouth orchid (Arethusa bulbosa). The island is part of the Town of Beals, in Washington County.

== See also ==
- List of islands of Maine
