= Great Wass Island Preserve =

Nature reserve in Maine, US

Coordinates: 44°28′24″N 67°34′47″W

Great Wass Island Preservation
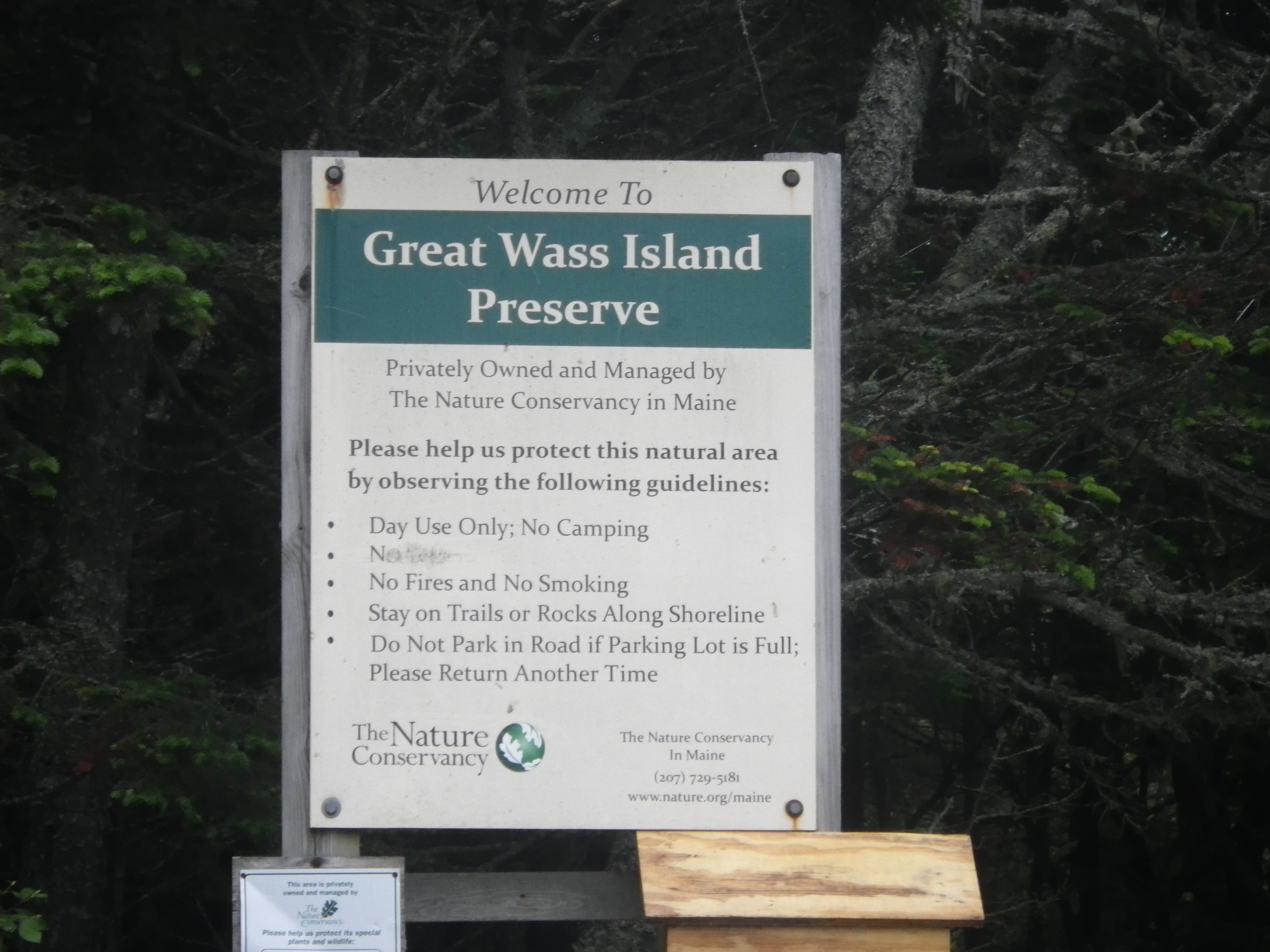
- Trailhead Sign
- Interactive map of Great Wass Island Preservation
- Established: 1978
- Operator: The Nature Conservancy
- Website: Official website

The Great Wass Island Preservation is a 1,576-acre (638 ha) open space reserve located on the coast of Maine, 40 miles (64 km) east of Ellsworth, Maine, on Great Wass Island. The reserve, managed by the land conservation non-profit organization The Nature Conservancy, is notable for its subarctic plants and coastal jackpine.

== Geography and Recreation ==
The Great Wass Island Preservation contains heaths and thin acidic soil on coastal bedrock. It is noted for a diverse plant population which includes carnivorous plants, subarctic iris (Iris hookeri), and coastal jackpine (Pinus banksiana). The preserve offers 4.5 miles (7.2 km) of trails for hiking. An interpretive brochure is provided at the trailhead kiosk.

== History ==
The Nature Conservancy acquired the land of the preservation in 1978. The Island is named after Charles Wass, who allegedly discovered the island in 1770.

Great Wass Island Preserve

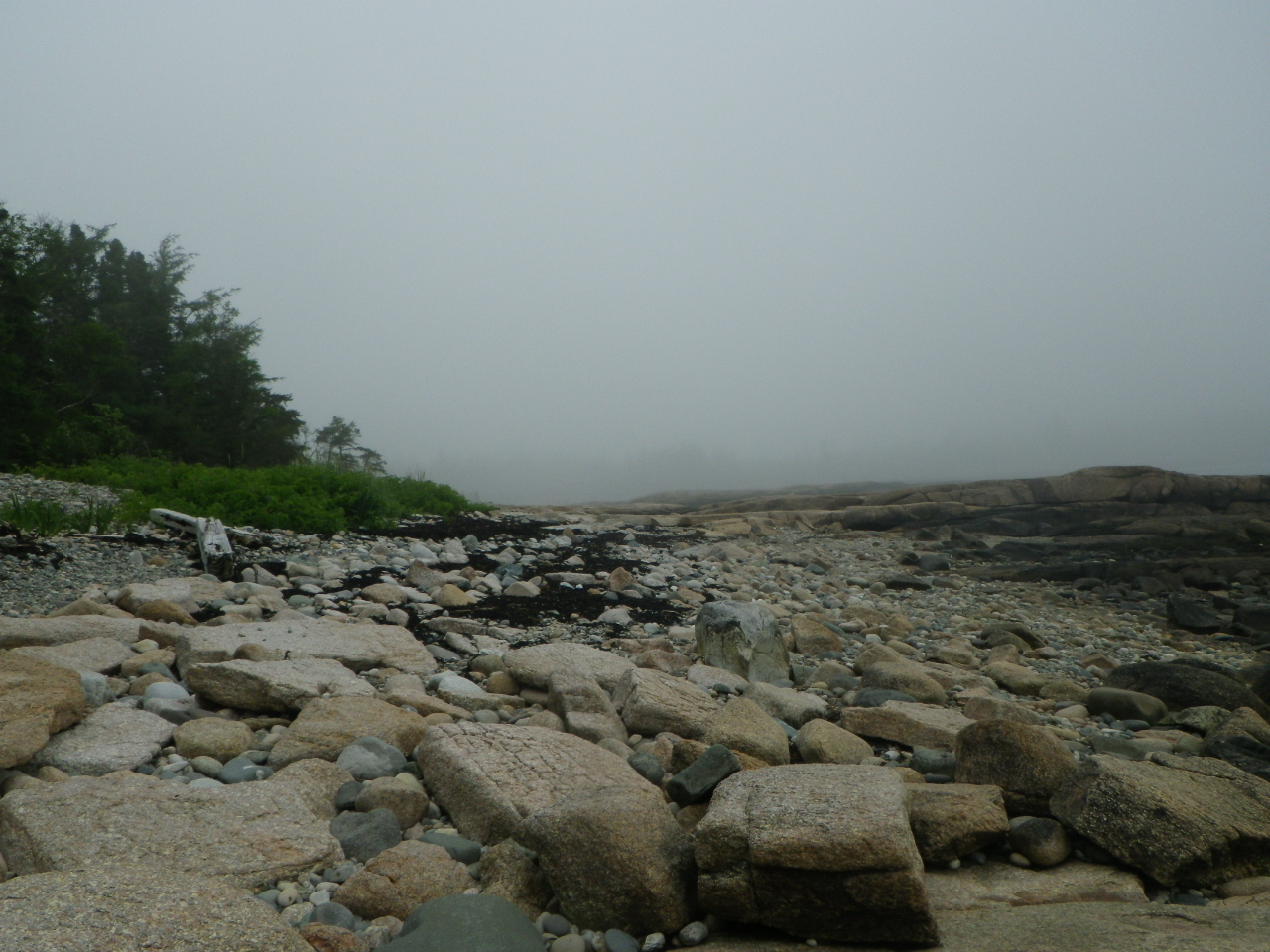
East Shore

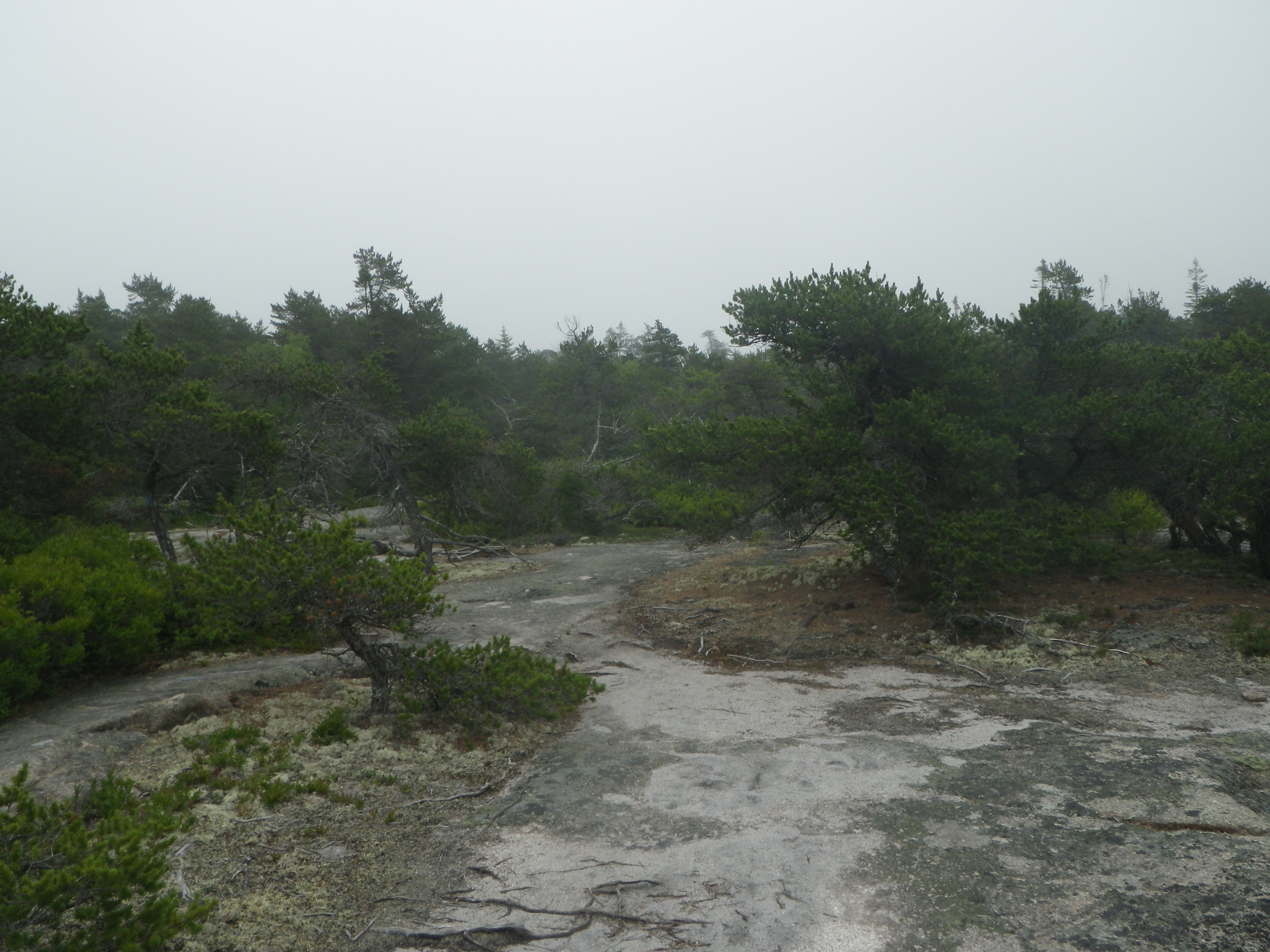
Trail

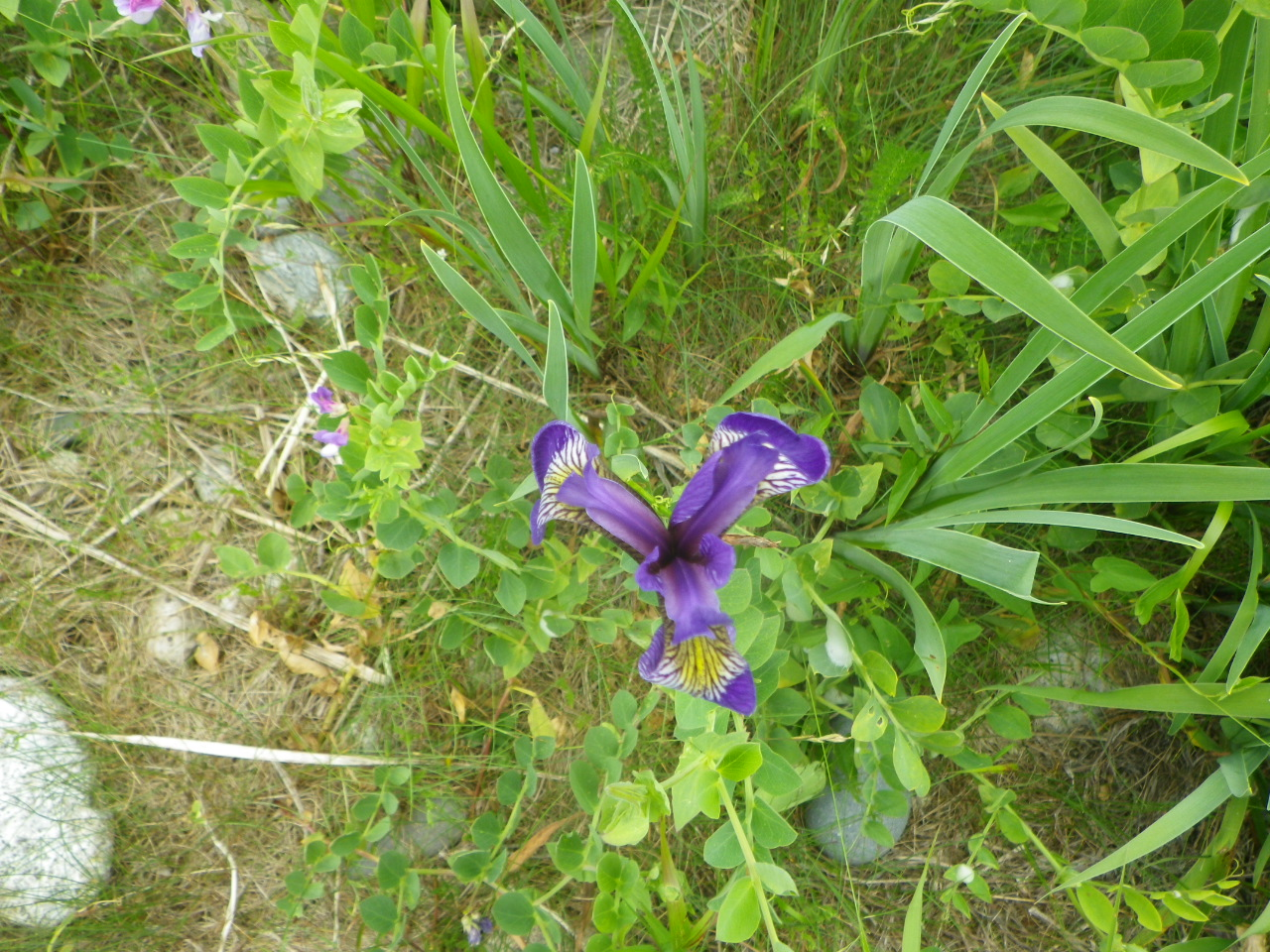
Iris hookeri
