= Flagpole of Freedom Park =

Proposed memorial complex

The Flagpole of Freedom Park was a proposed multi-use complex to be built near Columbia Falls, Maine, for the United States Semiquincentennial.

== Project ==
The developer was Worcester Resources, founded and directed by the Worcester family who owns Worcester Wreath Co. in Columbia Falls and who manages Wreaths Across America. The Worcesters envisioned a park honoring approximately 24 million deceased veterans, each of whom would have his or her name inscribed on one of 55 memorial walls, making it "the only place in the country to honor all ... veterans in one location" and "the equivalent of 411 Vietnam Wall Memorials."

The project was expected to take ten years to build, with the initial phase projected for completion on July 4, 2026, with the unveiling of a 1,461-foot flagpole designed by LeMessurier Consultants and built with an inside elevator and two observation decks. The Flagpole of Freedom was projected to be the tallest flagpole in the world, surpassing, by seven feet, the height of the Empire State Building. Plans called for the pole to fly "the largest American flag in the world at over 74,048 square feet — the equivalent area of almost 1 1/2 football fields." The flagpole was to stand on a 315-foot hill, with a total aggregate height of 1,776 above sea level. The Observation Ball deck would have offered "360 degree views in a 100-mile radius."

Park plans included a 4,000-seat amphitheater and concert space; trails for hiking, Nordic skiing and snowshoeing; restaurants, shops, and a hotel in a sector called the Village of Old Glory; six Halls of History museums with "immersive tech-driven exhibits." The Worcesters said that 90% of the park would be free to the public, with the remaining 10% comprising ticketed events at the theater and the museums.

The Worcesters publicly announced details of the project at a press conference held at the Augusta Civic Center on Tuesday, March 29, 2022. Two days later, Triple Impact Connections, which labels itself as "a first-of-its-kind veteran-owned customer contact center staffed by military spouses," issued a press release stating that it had partnered with the Flagpole of Freedom team.

The idea for a park had been under development for thirteen years. The proposed development site was located in the same balsam forest where Worcester Wreaths harvests garlands for Wreaths Across America, which is about an hour-and-a-half from Bangor and from the Canada–United States border.

The Worcesters prognosticated a workforce of 3,000 people involved in construction and approximately 12,000 full-time employees when completed.

The $1 billion project was to be registered as a for-profit limited liability company (LLC) and initially funded through private donations ranging from $660 to $1,800, with donors, or Park Founders, given lifetime admission to the site and their name inscribed at Founders Place. "The great thing about this is it's not funded by the government. It's going to be privately funded. And we can't really give it the title of a national park, but it will have almost more meaning than a national park," Mike Worcester said.

The Flagpole of Freedom website stated that the developer "will not begin construction until we have raised 25% of the capital needed to build the Park. If we don't meet that threshold in the sole and absolute discretion of Flagpole of Freedom Park management by 3/30/2023 ('Threshold Date'), all Park Foundership purchases will be cancelled unconditionally, and all foundership fees, less any credit card processing fees incurred for the purchase and refund transaction(s), will be refunded." On March 17, 2023, five days before Columbia Falls residents were to vote on a moratorium on large-scale developments in the town, Mike Worcester said the family was "in the process of returning" donors' money because of the delays, but remained "committed to moving this project forward."

On February 2, 2024, Worcester Resources lawyer Tim Pease told the Maine Monitor that the company had abandoned the project.

=== Proposed land annexation ===
The project site was on land within Centerville Township and T19 MD BPP, which are under the jurisdiction of the Maine Land Use Planning Commission (LUPC), the authority that oversees planning and zoning in the state's unorganized territories. In April 2022, the 130th Maine Legislature passed an act to allow the two lots, which together total 10,416 acres, to be annexed by the town of Columbia Falls, which would place jurisdiction for land use under the Columbia Falls Planning Board. The annexation was subject to approval by the legal voters of Columbia Falls at a town referendum. The annexation bill was sponsored by Senator Marianne Moore at the request of the Worcesters. Its language exempted the property from a Maine state statute that requires a municipality to adopt planning and zoning rules for annexed lands that are at least as protective as those applied by LUPC.

On October 10, 2022, the Columbia Falls Select Board proposed an agreement between the town and Worcester Resources that would require the company to deposit $150,000 with the town to pay for legal and planning costs associated with the Flagpole project. "The Project is expected to have a significant impact on, among other things, the existing land uses, natural, cultural and archaeological resources, scenic values, recreational resources, economy, public infrastructure, and rural character of Columbia Falls, Washington County, and the Downeast Region of Maine," the agreement stated. The Select Board also resolved to "ensure that the voters of the Town have the opportunity to become fully and fairly informed of the scope and scale of potential impacts of the Annexation Proposal and the Project." It said, "the Developer has failed to respond to the Town's requests to provide additional information regarding the Project, (and) has declined to enter into an agreement to pay the Town for fees and costs associated with the Town's evaluation and consideration of the Annexation Proposal." In a statement released October 14, 2022, Rob Worcester objected to the proposed $150,000 deposit, but said "we would very much like to find an agreeable figure that meets both the municipality's needs, and ours."

=== Government notice of violation ===
On July 15, 2022, the Maine Department of Environmental Protection (DEP) issued a notice of violation to Worcester Holdings LLC related to the construction of Flagpole of Freedom Cabins. According to the Flagpole of Freedom Cabins website, the cabins "are surrounded by the Worcester Balsam Farm's private land holdings to explore and are built with the intention of our guests viewing the progress of the future Flagpole of Freedom Park." In the letter to Worcester Holdings, the DEP said the company failed to comply with Maine's Site Location of Development Act and Erosion and Sedimentation Control Law. The letter said: "On July 13, 2022, Department staff investigated a complaint concerning the construction of the Flagpole View Cabins off the Centerville Road in Columbia Falls. During the inspection staff found 54 cabins, an office building, a take-out restaurant, parking areas and access roads that were either under construction or had been completed. An area in excess of three acres had been stripped, graded, and not revegetated at the time of the inspection. Aerial imagery reveals that much of this area has been stripped and graded since at least 2019. There were no erosion and sediment controls in place at the time of the inspection. A search of the Department's records found no evidence that the Department has issued a permit for this project. There is currently pending a Site Location application (#L-24835-28-B-N) for a similar project in another location on your parcel, but not for this location."

=== Development moratorium ===
Residents of Columbia Falls voted March 21, 2023, to implement a temporary moratorium on large-scale developments. The 180-day moratorium on large commercial and high-density residential projects passed with a vote of 63–17. The moratorium put a six-month pause on large-scale commercial development (commercial, industrial, or non-residential development that is more than 100 feet in height or disturbs 3 or more acres of land) and high-density residential development (development containing 15 or more dwelling units that disturbs 3 or more acres of land). A few months prior to the vote, the town's lawyer, Aga Dixon, said the moratorium was not specific to the Flagpole of Freedom. "No matter what kind of proposal comes before this community of any large scale, there are significant risks to this community in terms of overwhelming your public infrastructure, your public services, and changing the character of this community," Dixon said. At that time, Tim Pease, the Worcester Resources lawyer, told selectmen that a moratorium would have a negative impact on the project. "To potential investors it could be devastating. ... It could end up really damaging the prospects of the project inadvertently," Pease said.

As of February 2024, the town of Columbia Falls had not held a vote on the Worcesters' annexation proposal. Residents are to vote in March 2024 on a new Code of Ordinances that will prohibit large-scale development like the Flagpole of Freedom Park.

=== Project dropped ===
In the February 2, 2024, Maine Monitor article, lawyer Pease said he did not know the reason the company had dropped the project, only that it would "no longer be pursuing the plan anywhere. They are looking to the future and other ways to honor veterans."

=== Reactions ===
Veterans are largely a humble lot and the respect of our families, neighbors and local community is plenty sufficient, thank you...Veterans do not need a theme park. They are people who have struggled, fought, and died to see this country flourish, in freedom, in harmony, and with the promise of prosperity.

— Charles Kniffen, Bangor Daily News

Reactions to the project had been mixed, with News Center Maine commenting "[i]t's a plan that has drawn praise, curiosity, and criticism."

One October 22, 2022, Worcester Resources lawyer Pease told the Columbia Falls Board of Selectmen that some veterans groups declined to contribute to the project because of its for-profit status. "The 'for-profit' plan was a shock to the veteran groups and has caused us to slow things down," he said. Similarly, some critics felt the money would be more effective donated to organizations that directly aid veterans. In response, Rob Worcester commented that "instead of competing with those causes ... we would align with those, choose some of those to support with our profits."

Charles Kniffen, a combat-wounded veteran of the Vietnam War and the author of Fifty Years in a Foxhole, penned an op-ed, calling the project "an affront," perceiving it "as an effort to cash in...far beyond any claim to respect," concluding "a giant flagpole marring the beauty of our land and beckoning with an unsightly frenzy of flags to persons from afar is no honor."

Andrew Carleen, a U.S. Navy veteran, recalled the "Things Unnecessary" store in The Simpsons 'Tis the Fifteenth Season, calling "[t]he entire plan is a masterstroke of ostentatiousness." Carleen contrasted it to the Vietnam War Memorial, stating that "they do so while annihilating the sober minimalism that makes the original so striking," terming it, as well as the overuse of the flag, as "a child's definition of patriotism." He further commented on the destination of the funds and veterans' "greater rates of suicide and substance abuse than the general population," and pleaded the project to "leave [his] name off of your nationalist vanity project."

== See also ==
- George Washington Museum of American History
