= Harrington, Maine =

Town in Maine, United States

- Town
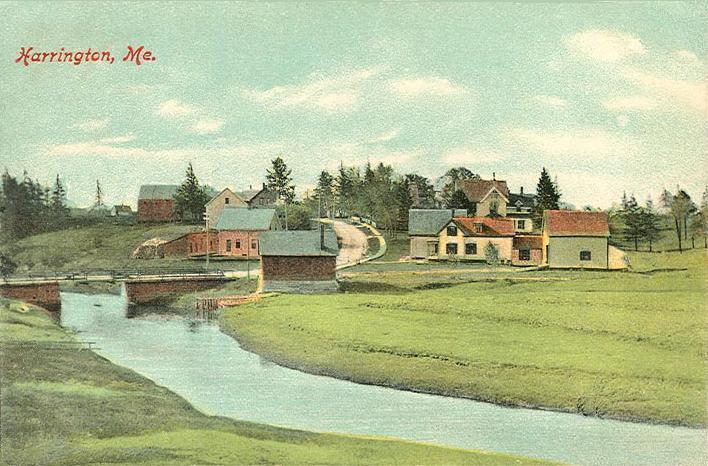
- View of Harrington c. 1908

- Location within Maine Location within the United States
- Coordinates: 44°31′57″N 67°49′31″W
- Country: United States
- State: Maine
- County: Washington
- Incorporated: 1797

Area
  - Total: 50.31 sq mi (130.30 km^{2})
  - Land: 21.11 sq mi (54.67 km^{2})
  - Water: 29.20 sq mi (75.63 km^{2})
- Elevation: 3 ft (0.91 m)

Population (2020)
  - Total: 962
  - Density: 46/sq mi (17.6/km^{2})
- Time zone: UTC-5 (Eastern (EST))
  - Summer (DST): UTC-4 (EDT)
- ZIP code: 04643
- Area code: 207
- FIPS code: 23-31530
- GNIS feature ID: 582512
- Website: harringtonmaine.com

Harrington is a town in Washington County, Maine, United States. The population was 962 at the 2020 census. Harrington is an old seafaring and shipbuilding village.

== History ==
Originally called Plantation Number 5, it was one of six townships east of the Union River granted in 1762 by the Massachusetts General Court to an association of petitioners. First settled about 1765, it had a population of 177 on June 17, 1797, when incorporated as Harrington. In 1848, the eastern part of the town incorporated as the town of Milbridge.

Farmers grew wheat and potatoes in the town's sandy loam. Harrington developed a considerable trade in lumber, and by 1859 contained two sawmills, three shingle mills and two lath mills. There was a gristmill, two brickyards, a tannery, and eighteen shipbuilders. In 1886, industries also included a sailmaker, and a boot and shoe manufacturer. Gallison Memorial Library still operates a limited schedule in Harrington.

== Geography ==
According to the United States Census Bureau, the town has a total area of 50.31 square miles (130.30 km^{2}), of which 21.11 square miles (54.67 km^{2}) is land and 29.20 square miles (75.63 km^{2}) is water. The town is at the head of Narraguagus Bay, and situated beside Harrington Bay and Pleasant Bay on the Gulf of Maine. It is drained by Curtis Creek, the Mill River and the Harrington River.

Harrington is crossed by U.S. Route 1 and U.S. Route 1A. It is bordered by the towns of Milbridge to the west, Cherryfield to the northwest, Columbia to the north, and Addison to the east.

== Demographics ==
Historical population
Census	Pop.	Note	%±
1800	298		—
1810	469		57.4%
1820	732		56.1%
1830	1,118		52.7%
1840	1,542		37.9%
1850	963		−37.5%
1860	1,130		17.3%
1870	1,142		1.1%
1880	1,290		13.0%
1890	1,150		−10.9%
1900	1,165		1.3%
1910	1,020		−12.4%
1920	1,024		0.4%
1930	865		−15.5%
1940	918		6.1%
1950	853		−7.1%
1960	717		−15.9%
1970	553		−22.9%
1980	859		55.3%
1990	893		4.0%
2000	882		−1.2%
2010	1,004		13.8%
2020	962		−4.2%
U.S. Decennial Census

=== 2010 census ===
As of the census of 2010, there were 1,004 people, 419 households, and 290 families living in the town. The population density was 47.6 inhabitants per square mile (18.4/km^{2}). There were 675 housing units at an average density of 32.0 per square mile (12.4/km^{2}). The racial makeup of the town was 97.5% White, 0.4% African American, 0.1% Native American, 0.3% Asian, 0.6% from other races, and 1.1% from two or more races. Hispanic or Latino of any race were 2.8% of the population.

There were 419 households, of which 29.1% had children under the age of 18 living with them, 54.2% were married couples living together, 8.8% had a female householder with no husband present, 6.2% had a male householder with no wife present, and 30.8% were non-families. 24.1% of all households were made up of individuals, and 12.2% had someone living alone who was 65 years of age or older. The average household size was 2.38 and the average family size was 2.76.

The median age in the town was 44.9 years. 21.1% of residents were under the age of 18; 6.9% were between the ages of 18 and 24; 22.3% were from 25 to 44; 31.3% were from 45 to 64; and 18.7% were 65 years of age or older. The gender makeup of the town was 49.8% male and 50.2% female.

=== 2000 census ===
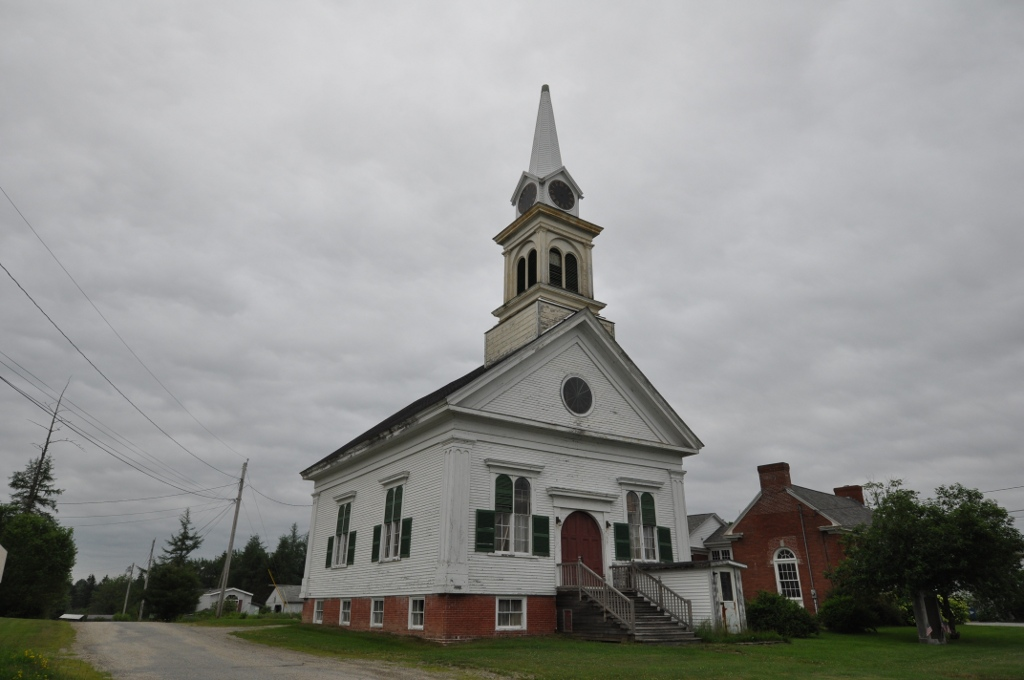
The old church in Harrington center

As of the census of 2000, there were 882 people, 364 households, and 256 families living in the town. The population density was 41.7 inhabitants per square mile (16.1/km^{2}). There were 563 housing units at an average density of 26.6 per square mile (10.3/km^{2}). The racial makeup of the town was 98.07% White, 0.11% Native American, 0.57% from other races, and 1.25% from two or more races. Hispanic or Latino of any race were 1.70% of the population.

There were 364 households, out of which 29.1% had children under the age of 18 living with them, 57.4% were married couples living together, 9.1% had a female householder with no husband present, and 29.4% were non-families. 22.5% of all households were made up of individuals, and 10.2% had someone living alone who was 65 years of age or older. The average household size was 2.41 and the average family size was 2.79.

In the town, the population was spread out, with 21.5% under the age of 18, 7.3% from 18 to 24, 26.5% from 25 to 44, 28.3% from 45 to 64, and 16.3% who were 65 years of age or older. The median age was 42 years. For every 100 females, there were 91.7 males. For every 100 females age 18 and over, there were 91.7 males.

The median income for a household in the town was $26,579, and the median income for a family was $29,211. Males had a median income of $24,038 versus $16,447 for females. The per capita income for the town was $13,224. About 14.9% of families and 19.2% of the population were below the poverty line, including 31.9% of those under age 18 and 9.1% of those age 65 or over.

== Education ==
- The town is home to Narraguagus High School.

== Notable people ==
- Irv Ray, MLB player, Boston Beaneaters, Baltimore Orioles
- Tiffany Strout, member of the Maine House of Representatives
