= Indian River (Maine) =

Location
- Country: United States

Physical characteristics
- Source
  - location: Maine
- Mouth
  - location: Wohoa Bay
  - coordinates: 44°32′06″N 67°39′36″W
  - elevation: sea level

Basin features
- Tributaries
  - right: Southwest Branch Indian River

The Indian River is a river in Washington County, Maine. From its source (44°40′27″N 67°42′09″W) in Columbia Falls, the river runs about 12.7 miles (20.4 km) south to its estuary at the village of Indian River in the town of Addison. The tidal portion of the Indian River extends another 3.6 miles (5.8 km) south through the township of Jonesport, and then west to Wohoa Bay, an arm of Western Bay on the Atlantic Ocean. The term "Indian River" is also used to loosely refer to the entire combined townships of Addison and Jonesport ("Indian River District") through which the river passes.

== See also ==
- List of rivers of Maine
