= Samuel Bucknam House =

Historic house in Maine, United States

- U.S. National Register of Historic Places
- Location within Maine Location within the United States
- Location: U.S. 1, Columbia Falls, Maine, United States
- Coordinates: 44°39′9″N 67°43′46″W
- Area: 0.5 acres (0.20 ha)
- Built: 1820
- Architect: Sherman, Aaron
- Architectural style: Cape
- NRHP reference No.: 78000203
- Added to NRHP: October 19, 1978

The Samuel Bucknam House is a historic house on Main Street (old United States Route 1) in Columbia Falls, Maine, United States. Built in 1820–21, it is one of the state's finest Federal-period Cape houses, with well-preserved woodwork and other features including original wallpaper in one room. The house was listed on the National Register of Historic Places in 1978.

== Description and history ==
The Bucknam House is a modest 1 1/2-story wood frame Cape house, five bays wide, with a side gable roof, clapboard siding, and a granite foundation. Oriented to face the northwest, the main facade has a center entry with a wooden fan above, and Doric pilasters at the sides, topped by carved reliefs of wooden urns. A kitchen ell extends to the northeast. Both main block and ell have chimneys capped by distinctive arched brick covers. The interior of the house has detailed woodwork, including beaded moldings, friezes, fireplace mantels, and door frames. The main parlor still has its original wallpaper.

Samuel Bucknam had this house built in 1820–21. He was the grandson of John Bucknam, one of Columbia Falls' earliest settlers, who established a lumber mill and then a shipyard on the Pleasant River. Samuel apparently inherited his grandfather's businesses, and was thus able to build a relatively high-quality house in this comparatively remote settings.

== See also ==
- National Register of Historic Places listings in Washington County, Maine
