= Ruggles House (Maine) =

Historic house in Maine, United States

- U.S. National Register of Historic Places
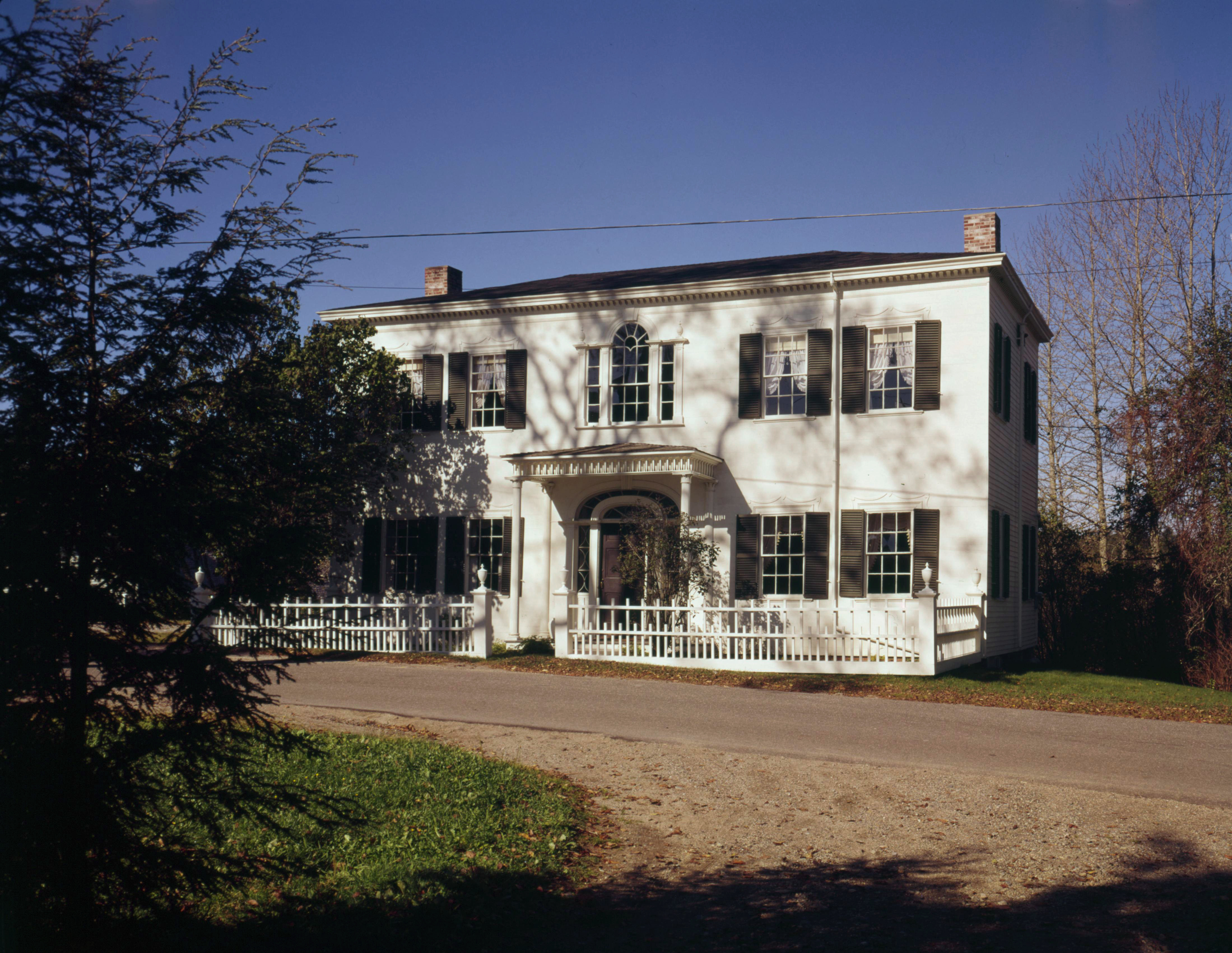
- Ruggles House, Columbia Falls

- Location within Maine Location within the United States
- Location: 146 Main St., Columbia Falls, Maine
- Coordinates: 44°39′8.3″N 67°43′47.3″W
- Area: 1 acre (0.40 ha)
- Built: 1820
- Built by: Aaron Sherman, Aleah Peterson
- NRHP reference No.: 70000080
- Added to NRHP: January 26, 1970

Ruggles House is a historic house museum at 146 Main Street in Columbia Falls, Maine. Built from 1818 to 1820, in Adamesque style, it is noted for its flying staircase and handcrafted woodwork. The house was listed on the National Register of Historic Places in 1970.

== History ==
The house was built by housewright Aaron Sherman and woodcarver Alvah Peterson for Thomas Ruggles from Rochester, Massachusetts. Ruggles was a shipbuilder, sawmill owner, militia captain, postmaster, and justice of the court in Machias. His descendants owned the property until 1920, when his granddaughter Lizzie died. Mary Ruggles Chandler, Lizzie's cousin and the first licensed pharmacist in Maine, helped preserve and restore the house during the 1930s. It has been operated as a museum since 1951. Many of the furnishings originally belonged to the Ruggles family.

== Description ==
The Ruggles House is located in the village center of Columbia Falls, north of the junction of Main Street and Addison Road. It is a wood-frame structure, two stories in height, with a hip roof and clapboard siding. The main facade is five bays wide, with a central entrance sheltered by a hip-roof portico supported by round columns. The eave of the porch and main roof both have dentil molding. The entrance is flanked by sidelight windows and topped by an elaborate multipart semi-oval fanlight window. The interior retains high quality woodwork, including elaborate hand-carved fireplace mantels in the parlor and dining room. The showpiece of the house is its central staircase. It stands free in the center of the hall, rising to a landing where it reverses on both sides without any visible support. This type of "flying staircase" is rare, especially for a modestly-sized house.

== See also ==
- National Register of Historic Places listings in Washington County, Maine
