= Irv Ray =

American baseball player (1864–1948)

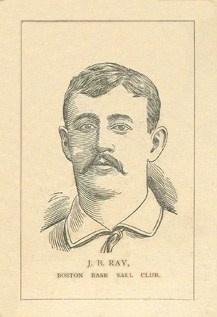
- Shortstop
- Born: January 22, 1864; Harrington, Maine
- Died: February 21, 1948 (aged 84); Harrington, Maine
- Batted: Left Threw: Right

MLB debut
- July 7, 1888, for the Boston Beaneaters

Last MLB appearance
- September 2, 1891, for the Baltimore Orioles

MLB statistics
- Batting average: .292
- Home runs: 3
- Runs batted in: 123
- Stats at Baseball Reference

Teams
- Boston Beaneaters (1888–1889); Baltimore Orioles (1889–1891)

Irving Burton "Stubby" Ray (1864–1948) was an American professional baseball shortstop. He played with the Boston Beaneaters of the National League from 1888 to 1889 and the Baltimore Orioles of the American Association from 1889 to 1891. He played college baseball at Maine before beginning his professional career.
