= Harrington Bay =

Bay in Maine, United States

Coordinates: 44°32′N 67°49′W

Harrington Bay is a bay in Washington County, Maine.

Located between the towns of Harrington and Milbridge, it is separated from Pleasant Bay on the east by Ripley Neck, and from Narraguagus Bay on the west and south by Fastet Island and Dyer Island. The bay extends roughly 6 mi. (10 km) and is 3 mi. (5 km) at its widest.
