= Columbia House (Columbia Falls, Maine) =

Historic house in Maine, United States

- U.S. National Register of Historic Places
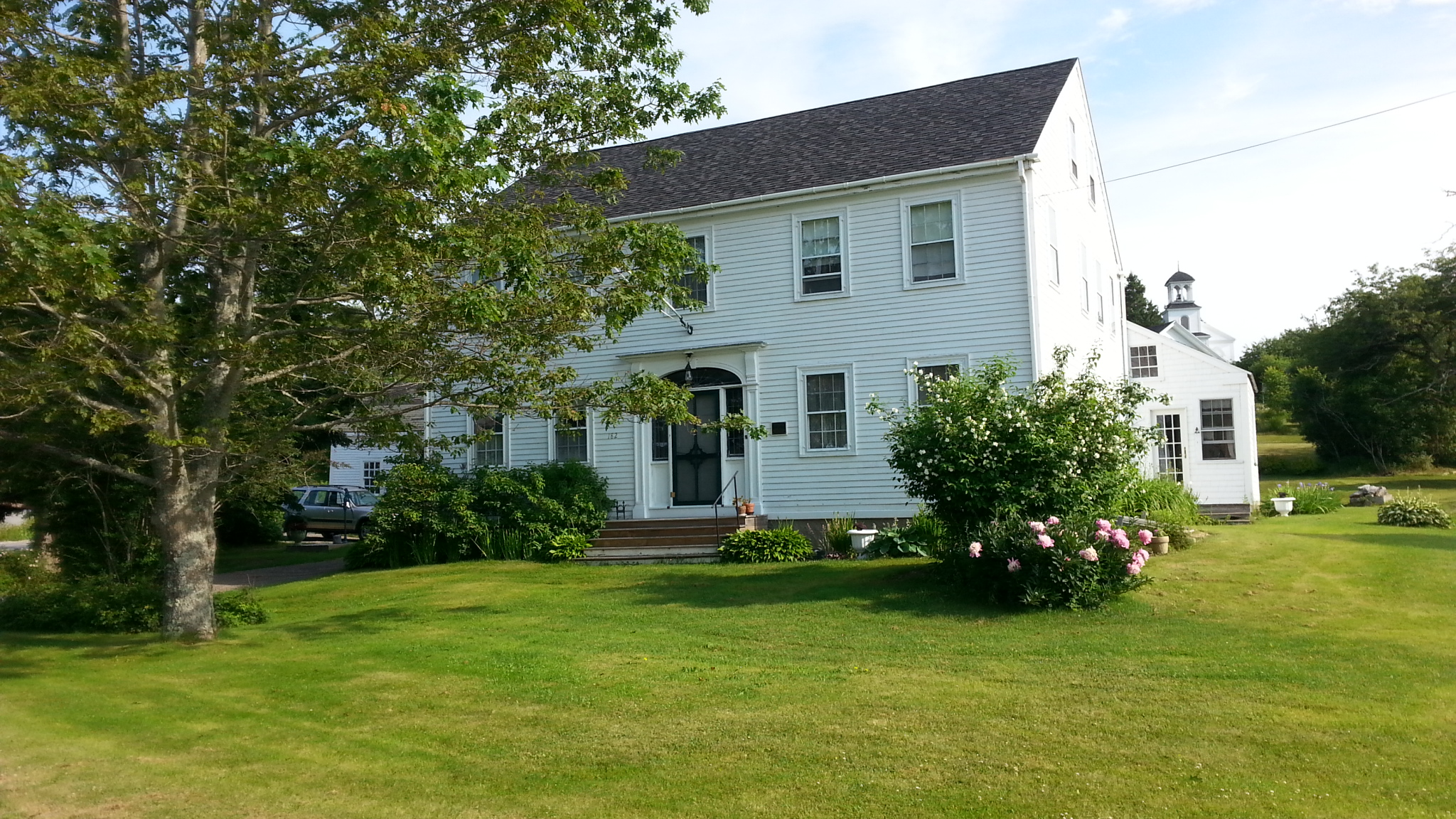

- Location within Maine Location within the United States
- Location: Main St. at jct. with Church Hill Circle, Columbia Falls, Maine
- Coordinates: 44°39′15″N 67°43′43″W
- Area: less than one acre
- Built: 1834
- Architectural style: Federal
- NRHP reference No.: 00001203
- Added to NRHP: October 12, 2000

Columbia House, also known as Gowen Wilson Tavern, is a historic house and hotel on Main Street in Columbia Falls, Maine. Probably built about 1834, it was for many years the town's only hotel, apparently closing about 1882. It is a locally important example of transitional Federal-Greek Revival architecture, and was listed on the National Register of Historic Places in 2000.

== Description and history ==
Columbia House is set on the north side of Main Street, at the junction with Church Circle, in the center of the main village of Columbia Falls. It is a 2 1/2-story wood-frame structure, five bays wide, with a side-gable roof, twin interior chimneys, and a granite foundation. The main facade faces south, and has a center entry flanked by sidelights and pilasters, and topped by a semi-elliptical fan and cornice. A short single-story ell joins the main block to a wing and carriage barn at the rear. The interior has a center hall plan, with a Federal style carved staircase, and a main parlor space with Greek Revival woodwork.

Although the house has long traditionally been ascribed a construction date of 1820, its transitional Federal-Greek Revival style suggests a later date. Gowen (or Gowin) Wilson, Jr., who is generally credited with building the house and later operating a hotel on the premises, was born in 1808 and married in 1833, so it is likely that the house's construction took place near the latter event. Business records of the period indicate that it was operated by Wilson as the community's only hotel until about 1882, when it is no longer listed in business directories. It was owned for many years thereafter by Wilson's descendants. The inn's register includes an entry from 1868 when there was a leap year party. Per tradition, women could ask men for dances and even propose marriage on leap day (bachelor's day).

Columbia House was placed on the National Register of Historic Places on October 12, 2000.

== See also ==
- National Register of Historic Places listings in Washington County, Maine
