= Beals, Maine =

Town in Maine, United States

- Town
- Location within Maine Location within the United States
- Coordinates: 44°28′50″N 67°36′14″W
- Country: United States
- State: Maine
- County: Washington

Area
  - Total: 48.33 sq mi (125.17 km^{2})
  - Land: 5.62 sq mi (14.56 km^{2})
  - Water: 42.71 sq mi (110.62 km^{2})
- Elevation: 0 ft (0 m)

Population (2020)
  - Total: 443
  - Density: 79/sq mi (30.4/km^{2})
- Time zone: UTC-5 (Eastern (EST))
  - Summer (DST): UTC-4 (EDT)
- ZIP code: 04611
- Area code: 207
- FIPS code: 23-03670
- GNIS feature ID: 582344

Beals is a town in Washington County, Maine, United States, located on an island opposite Jonesport. The town was named after Manwarren Beal, an early settler. The population was 443 at the 2020 census.

== Geography ==
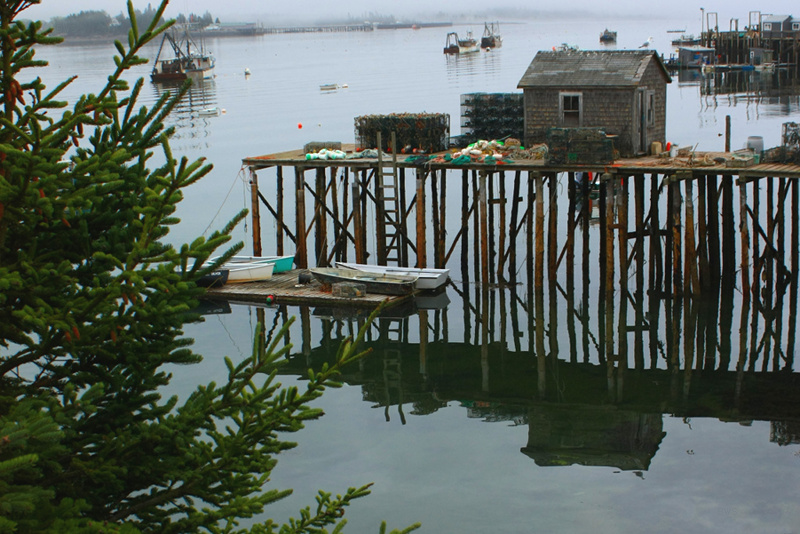
Pier at low tide

According to the United States Census Bureau, the town has a total area of 48.33 square miles (125.17 km^{2}), of which 5.62 square miles (14.56 km^{2}) is land and 42.71 square miles (110.62 km^{2}) is water. The main settlement of Beals is located on Beals Island, which is connected by a bridge across Moosabec Reach to Jonesport on the mainland. Beals Island is connected to the southeast by a short bridge to Great Wass Island, also within the town of Beals and which comprises the Great Wass Island Preserve.

== Demographics ==
Historical population
| Census | Pop. | Note | %± |
|---|---|---|---|
| 1830 | 55 | | — |
| 1930 | 524 | | — |
| 1940 | 513 | | −2.1% |
| 1950 | 590 | | 15.0% |
| 1960 | 640 | | 8.5% |
| 1970 | 663 | | 3.6% |
| 1980 | 695 | | 4.8% |
| 1990 | 667 | | −4.0% |
| 2000 | 618 | | −7.3% |
| 2010 | 508 | | −17.8% |
| 2020 | 443 | | −12.8% |
U.S. Decennial Census

=== 2010 census ===
As of the census of 2010, there were 508 people, 228 households, and 147 families living in the town. The population density was 90.4 inhabitants per square mile (34.9/km^{2}). There were 361 housing units at an average density of 64.2 per square mile (24.8/km^{2}). The racial makeup of the town was 97.8% White, 0.8% African American, 0.8% Native American, and 0.6% from two or more races.

There were 228 households, of which 23.2% had children under the age of 18 living with them, 54.4% were married couples living together, 6.6% had a female householder with no husband present, 3.5% had a male householder with no wife present, and 35.5% were non-families. 28.1% of all households were made up of individuals, and 12.3% had someone living alone who was 65 years of age or older. The average household size was 2.23 and the average family size was 2.69.

The median age in the town was 48.1 years. 16.9% of residents were under the age of 18; 9.2% were between the ages of 18 and 24; 18.8% were from 25 to 44; 32.6% were from 45 to 64; and 22.2% were 65 years of age or older. The gender makeup of the town was 51.2% male and 48.8% female.

=== 2000 census ===
As of the census of 2000, there were 618 people, 237 households, and 188 families living in the town. The population density was 108.7 inhabitants per square mile (42.0/km^{2}). There were 370 housing units at an average density of 65.1 per square mile (25.1/km^{2}). The racial makeup of the town was 97.57% White, 1.29% African American, 0.65% Native American, 0.16% Asian, and 0.32% from two or more races. Hispanic or Latino of any race were 2.10% of the population.

There were 237 households, out of which 34.6% had children under the age of 18 living with them, 69.6% were married couples living together, 6.3% had a female householder with no husband present, and 20.3% were non-families. 16.0% of all households were made up of individuals, and 9.3% had someone living alone who was 65 years of age or older. The average household size was 2.55 and the average family size was 2.85.

In the town, the population was spread out, with 24.9% under the age of 18, 5.8% from 18 to 24, 27.5% from 25 to 44, 24.3% from 45 to 64, and 17.5% who were 65 years of age or older. The median age was 40 years. For every 100 females, there were 106.7 males. For every 100 females age 18 and over, there were 104.4 males.

The median income for a household in the town was $29,375, and the median income for a family was $31,458. Males had a median income of $28,125 versus $24,167 for females. The per capita income for the town was $13,133. About 10.6% of families and 16.7% of the population were below the poverty line, including 20.8% of those under age 18 and 11.9% of those age 65 or over.
