= Eric Dowdle =

American artist

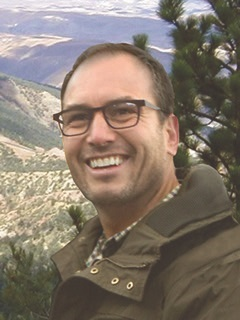
- Born: May 2, 1968 (age 58); Boise, Idaho
- Occupation: Folk artist
- Website: dowdlefolkart.com

Eric Dowdle is an American painter and creator of folk art. He is the founder of Dowdle Folk Art where he turns his paintings into puzzles, selling more than 30 million puzzles based on 400 pieces of his artwork. He has hosted television and radio programs on the topic and won numerous awards for his work.

== Early life and education ==
Dowdle was born in 1968 and is the 10th of 12 siblings. He grew up in Idaho and Wyoming and attended Green River High School, moving to Massachusetts upon graduation. He attributes his experience of growing up on a farm to details he uses in his art. In high school, he won numerous awards for his paintings, including 16 awards at the Wyoming State Art Symposium.

== Career ==
Dowdle became familiar with the folk art of Charles Wysocki after moving to Massachusetts. After moving to Utah he began his career in painting by going door to door offering to do paintings of peoples homes. He became known for his paintings of cities and local landmarks and in the 1990s was commissioned to paint eight original works depicting Salt Lake City, Utah. In the late 1990s, Dowdle turned some of his paintings into puzzles. He began selling the puzzles through Dowdle Folk Art and has since sold more than 30 million puzzles based on more than 400 pieces of his artwork.

Dowdle partnered with Disney in 2019 and created 13 original works based on Disney Classics. Outside of painting, he hosted the radio program Traveling with Eric Dowdle which evolved into three season of a television program titled Painting the Town with Eric Dowdle. He also started the Utah PTA Art Endowment to raise funds for art programs throughout Utah.

In 2024, he put his painting of Butte on sale. The portrait was converted to puzzles; 15,000 pieces were made available for sale.
