= Harrington River =

Location
- Country: United States

Physical characteristics
- Source
  - location: Maine
- Mouth
  - location: Harrington Bay
  - coordinates: 44°32′38″N 67°48′32″W
  - elevation: sea level

The Harrington River is a 7.3-mile-long (11.7 km) river in Washington County, Maine. It empties into Harrington Bay in Harrington, Maine.

== See also ==
- List of rivers of Maine
