= Columbia Falls, Maine =

Town in Maine, United States

- Town
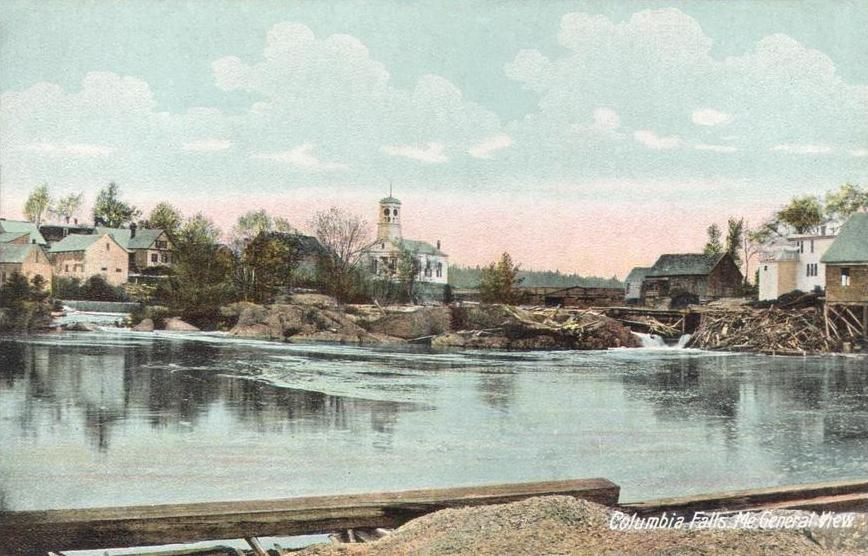
- Town Hall and Pleasant River c. 1908

- Location within Maine Location within the United States
- Coordinates: 44°42′12″N 67°44′18″W
- Country: United States
- State: Maine
- County: Washington
- Incorporated: 1863

Area
  - Total: 24.67 sq mi (63.90 km^{2})
  - Land: 24.55 sq mi (63.58 km^{2})
  - Water: 0.12 sq mi (0.31 km^{2})
- Elevation: 164 ft (50 m)

Population (2020)
  - Total: 476
  - Density: 19/sq mi (7.5/km^{2})
- Time zone: UTC-5 (Eastern (EST))
  - Summer (DST): UTC-4 (EDT)
- ZIP code: 04623
- Area code: 207
- FIPS code: 23-13820
- GNIS feature ID: 582415
- Website: columbiafallsmaine.org

Columbia Falls is a town in Washington County, Maine, United States. The population was 476 at the 2020 census.

It derives its name from the Class I-III Rapids on the Pleasant River (Pleasant Bay) that flow through the town. Columbia Falls and its Washington County neighbor Columbia, Maine were once the same town. However in 1863 Columbia Falls formed its own town.

In 2023 the community gained national attention after a proposal to build the world's tallest flagpole (1,461 feet (445 meters) high—taller than the Empire State Building)—in a $1 billion project that includes a 4,000 seat auditorium in dubbed the Flagpole of Freedom Park.

The project has been proposed by local businessman Morrill Worcester whose company Worcester Wreath Co. which expanded to Wreaths Across America and donates more than one million wreaths to military cemeteries and gravesites around the world.

The project was abandoned February of 2024.

== History ==
The town began as Township 13 SD, BPP, which was joined together with Township 12 by the Massachusetts General Court on February 8, 1796, and incorporated as Columbia. It was settled soon after the Revolutionary War. On March 25, 1863, the town was set off from Columbia and incorporated as Columbia Falls.

Lumbering and shipbuilding brought the town prosperity and endowed it with some fine early architecture. This includes the Ruggles House (1818–1820), an exquisite Federal home that is now a museum, and the Union Church (1849), a Greek Revival meeting house which since 1902 has housed the town hall, library and archives. The Washington County Railroad arrived at Columbia Falls in 1898. Tourism and harvesting blueberries are important industries today, together with producing Christmas trees and wreaths.

== Geography ==
According to the United States Census Bureau, the town has a total area of 24.67 square miles (63.90 km^{2}), of which 24.55 square miles (63.58 km^{2}) is land and 0.12 square miles (0.31 km^{2}) is water. Columbia Falls is drained by the Pleasant River.

The town is crossed by U.S. Route 1 and Maine State Route 187.

== Demographics ==
Historical population
Census	Pop.	Note	%±
1870	608		—
1880	685		12.7%
1890	698		1.9%
1900	569		−18.5%
1910	663		16.5%
1920	658		−0.8%
1930	583		−11.4%
1940	596		2.2%
1950	550		−7.7%
1960	442		−19.6%
1970	367		−17.0%
1980	517		40.9%
1990	552		6.8%
2000	599		8.5%
2010	560		−6.5%
2020	476		−15.0%
U.S. Decennial Census

=== 2010 census ===
As of the census of 2010, there were 560 people, 257 households, and 157 families living in the town. The population density was 22.8 inhabitants per square mile (8.8/km^{2}). There were 301 housing units at an average density of 12.3 per square mile (4.7/km^{2}). The racial makeup of the town was 97.5% White, 0.4% Native American, 0.7% Asian, 0.2% from other races, and 1.3% from two or more races. Hispanic or Latino of any race were 1.4% of the population.

There were 257 households, of which 23.7% had children under the age of 18 living with them, 48.2% were married couples living together, 8.2% had a female householder with no husband present, 4.7% had a male householder with no wife present, and 38.9% were non-families. 33.5% of all households were made up of individuals, and 15.2% had someone living alone who was 65 years of age or older. The average household size was 2.18 and the average family size was 2.71.

The median age in the town was 46 years. 18.7% of residents were under the age of 18; 6.5% were between the ages of 18 and 24; 23.4% were from 25 to 44; 32.5% were from 45 to 64; and 18.9% were 65 years of age or older. The gender makeup of the town was 49.5% male and 50.5% female.

=== 2000 census ===
As of the census of 2000, there were 599 people, 251 households, and 168 families living in the town. The population density was 24.4 inhabitants per square mile (9.4/km^{2}). There were 310 housing units at an average density of 12.6 per square mile (4.9/km^{2}). The racial makeup of the town was 97.83% White, 0.83% Native American, 0.33% Asian, 0.67% from other races, and 0.33% from two or more races. Hispanic or Latino of any race were 0.67% of the population.

There were 251 households, out of which 33.1% had children under the age of 18 living with them, 56.6% were married couples living together, 8.4% had a female householder with no husband present, and 32.7% were non-families. 28.3% of all households were made up of individuals, and 11.6% had someone living alone who was 65 years of age or older. The average household size was 2.39 and the average family size was 2.90.

In the town, the population was spread out, with 24.2% under the age of 18, 6.7% from 18 to 24, 29.0% from 25 to 44, 26.0% from 45 to 64, and 14.0% who were 65 years of age or older. The median age was 38 years. For every 100 females, there were 107.3 males. For every 100 females age 18 and over, there were 102.7 males.

The median income for a household in the town was $28,864, and the median income for a family was $40,208. Males had a median income of $28,021 versus $19,625 for females. The per capita income for the town was $14,723. About 12.9% of families and 19.0% of the population were below the poverty line, including 26.1% of those under age 18 and 29.1% of those age 65 or over.

== Sites of interest ==
- Bucknam House, listed on the National Register of Historic Places
- Samuel Bucknam House, listed on the National Register of Historic Places
- Columbia House, listed on the National Register of Historic Places
- Ruggles House
- Union Church, listed on the National Register of Historic Places
- Wild Blueberry Heritage Center, museum & gift shop
- Pledge of Allegiance plaques, a series of plaques along route 1

== Education ==
It is in the School Administrative District 37.

There was a Columbia Falls Elementary School, but it closed.

== Notable people ==
- F. Eugene Farnsworth, Ku Klux Klan organizer
- Irv Young, professional baseball player
