= Pleasant Bay (Maine) =

Bay in Maine, US

Coordinates: 44°31′N 67°46′W

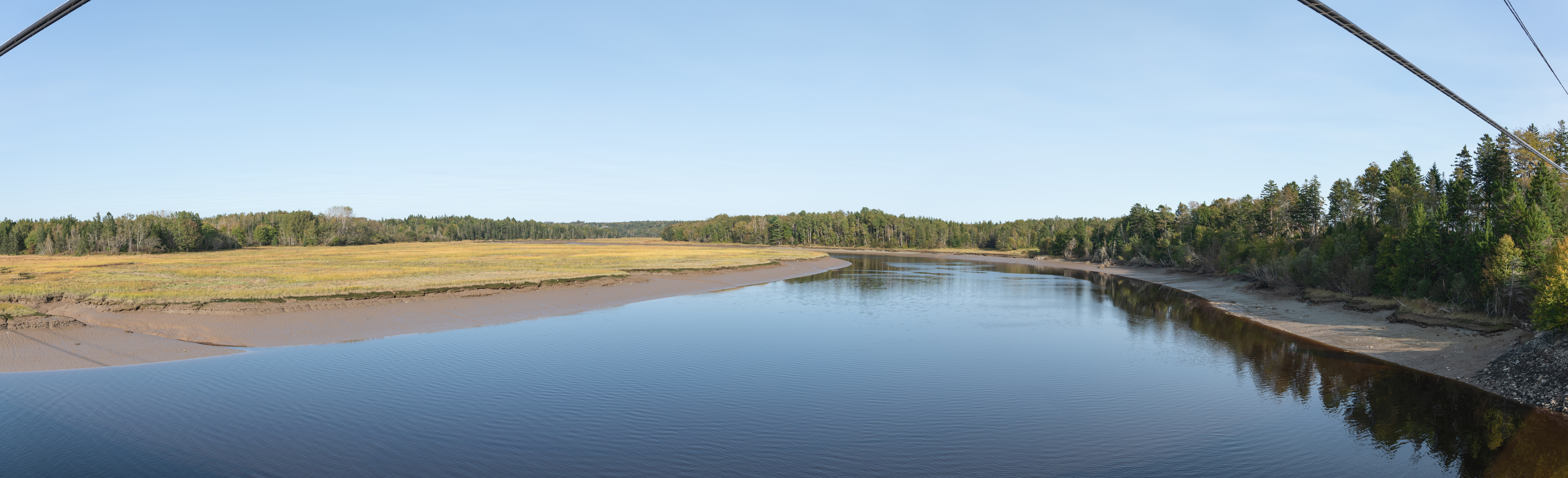
Pleasant River, which is a part of Pleasant Bay

Pleasant Bay is a bay in Washington County, Maine. It contains three rivers: Narraguagus River, Pleasant River, and Harrington River. Mudflats are present in coastal areas of the bay. The bay functions as a staging area for migratory birds as well as migratory fish like Atlantic Salmon. Some other species found in the area include: bald eagles, peregrine falcons, and crowberry blue butterflies.
