= Pleasant River (Pleasant Bay) =

River in Washington County, Maine, USA

Location
- Country: United States

Physical characteristics
- Source
  - location: Maine
- Mouth
  - coordinates: 44°32′53″N 67°45′47″W
  - elevation: sea level

Basin features
- Tributaries
  - left: Taylor Branch, Western Little River, Little River
  - right: West Branch Pleasant River

The Pleasant River is a river in Washington County, Maine. From the outflow of Pleasant River Lake (44°50′08″N 67°57′45″W) in Beddington, the river runs 44.8 miles (72.1 km) south, east, and south to Pleasant Bay. The river's mouth is on the border between the towns of Harrington and Addison.

== See also ==
- List of rivers of Maine
