= Addison, Maine =

Town in Maine, United States

- Town
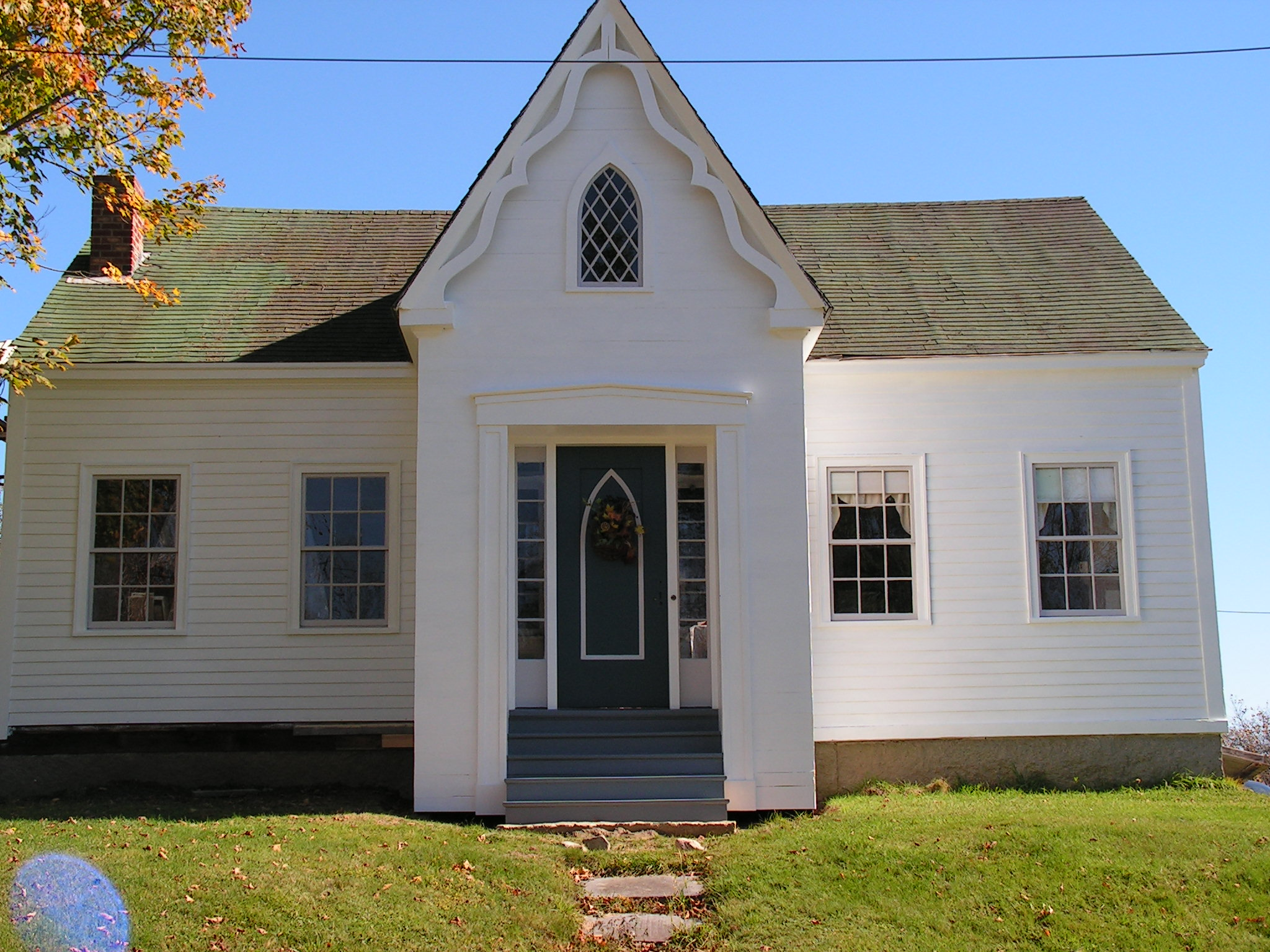
- Capt. John Plummer House

- Seal

- Location within the state of Maine Addison (the United States)
- Coordinates: 44°33′26″N 67°42′44″W
- Country: United States
- State: Maine
- County: Washington

Area
  - Total: 100.47 sq mi (260.22 km^{2})
  - Land: 42.44 sq mi (109.92 km^{2})
  - Water: 58.03 sq mi (150.30 km^{2})
- Elevation: 79 ft (24 m)

Population (2020)
  - Total: 1,148
  - Density: 27/sq mi (10.4/km^{2})
- Time zone: UTC-5 (Eastern (EST))
  - Summer (DST): UTC-4 (EDT)
- ZIP code: 04606
- Area code: 207
- FIPS code: 23-00380
- GNIS feature ID: 582316
- Website: addisonmaine.org

Addison is a town in Washington County, Maine, United States. The town was named after English author Joseph Addison. The population was 1,148 as of the 2020 census.

== Geography ==
According to the United States Census Bureau, the town has a total area of 100.47 square miles (260.22 km^{2}), of which 42.44 square miles (109.92 km^{2}) is land and 58.03 square miles (150.30 km^{2}) is water.

== Demographics ==
Historical population
| Census | Pop. | Note | %± |
|---|---|---|---|
| 1800 | 315 | | — |
| 1810 | 399 | | 26.7% |
| 1820 | 519 | | 30.1% |
| 1830 | 741 | | 42.8% |
| 1840 | 1,053 | | 42.1% |
| 1850 | 1,152 | | 9.4% |
| 1860 | 1,272 | | 10.4% |
| 1870 | 1,201 | | −5.6% |
| 1880 | 1,238 | | 3.1% |
| 1890 | 1,022 | | −17.4% |
| 1900 | 1,059 | | 3.6% |
| 1910 | 985 | | −7.0% |
| 1920 | 838 | | −14.9% |
| 1930 | 867 | | 3.5% |
| 1940 | 805 | | −7.2% |
| 1950 | 846 | | 5.1% |
| 1960 | 744 | | −12.1% |
| 1970 | 773 | | 3.9% |
| 1980 | 1,061 | | 37.3% |
| 1990 | 1,114 | | 5.0% |
| 2000 | 1,209 | | 8.5% |
| 2010 | 1,266 | | 4.7% |
| 2020 | 1,148 | | −9.3% |
U.S. Decennial Census

=== 2010 census ===
As of the census of 2010, there were 1,266 people, 529 households, and 359 families residing in the town. The population density was 29.8 inhabitants per square mile (11.5/km^{2}). There were 809 housing units at an average density of 19.1 per square mile (7.4/km^{2}). The racial makeup of the town was 96.4% White, 0.5% African American, 1.7% Native American, 0.6% Asian, 0.1% from other races, and 0.7% from two or more races. Hispanic or Latino of any race were 0.7% of the population.

There were 529 households, of which 28.5% had children under the age of 18 living with them, 56.0% were married couples living together, 7.2% had a female householder with no husband present, 4.7% had a male householder with no wife present, and 32.1% were non-families. 22.7% of all households were made up of individuals, and 9.6% had someone living alone who was 65 years of age or older. The average household size was 2.37 and the average family size was 2.77.

The median age in the town was 45.1 years. 20.5% of residents were under the age of 18; 5.5% were between the ages of 18 and 24; 23.8% were from 25 to 44; 30.9% were from 45 to 64; and 19.3% were 65 years of age or older. The gender makeup of the town was 49.4% male and 50.6% female.

=== 2000 census ===
As of the census of 2000, there were 1,209 people, 489 households, and 341 families with a population density of 28.5 people per square mile (11.0 people/km^{2}), and 723 housing units at an average density of 17.1 per square mile (6.6/km^{2}). The racial makeup of the town was 98.10% White, 0.58% African American, 0.25% Native American, 0.25% Asian, 0.08% Pacific Islander, 0.08% from other races, and 0.66% from two or more races. Hispanic or Latino of any race were 0.17% of the population.

There were 489 households, out of which 31.1% of which had children under the age of 18 living in them, 59.5% were married couples living together, 6.1% had a female householder with no husband present, and 30.1% were non-families. 21.1% of all households were made up of individuals, and 9.2% had someone living alone who was 65 years of age or older. The average household size was 2.45 and the average family size was 2.83.

In the town, the population was spread, with 23.5% under the age of 18, 6.1% from 18 to 24, 26.8% from 25 to 44, 29.5% from 45 to 64, and 14.1% were 65 years of age or older. The median age was 40 years. For every 100 females, there were 96.9 males. For every 100 females age 18 and over, there were 96.4 males.

The median income for a household in the town was $26,083, and the median income for a family was $30,000. Males had a median income of $22,432 versus $18,194 for females. The per capita income for the town was $15,951. About 14.7% of families and 20.4% of the population were below the poverty line, including 27.9% of those under age 18 and 16.6% of those age 65 or over.

== Recreation ==
Recreational opportunities include walking trails, beaches, islands, and parks.

== Notable person ==
- Henry Plummer (1832–1864), sheriff and outlaw leader of The Innocents, in Bannack, Montana, Idaho Territory
