= List of lighthouses in Maine =

This is a list of all lighthouses in the U.S. state of Maine as identified by the United States Coast Guard. There are fifty-seven active lights in the state, two of which are maintained as private aids; nine are standing but inactive, and three have been destroyed, one of which has been replaced by a skeleton tower. This includes two stations which originally featured twin towers; in both cases both towers survive but only one of each pair is active.

The Portland Head Light, first lit in 1791, is the oldest light in the state and was the first US lighthouse completed after independence from Britain. The last lighthouse in the state, the second Whitlocks Mill Light, was first lit in 1910; it is also the most northerly light in the state and therefore on the US Atlantic Coast. The West Quoddy Head Light sits on the easternmost point of the continental United States. The tallest tower is that of Boon Island Light at 137 ft (42 m), though the Seguin Light focal plane, at 180 ft (55 m), is the highest in the state.

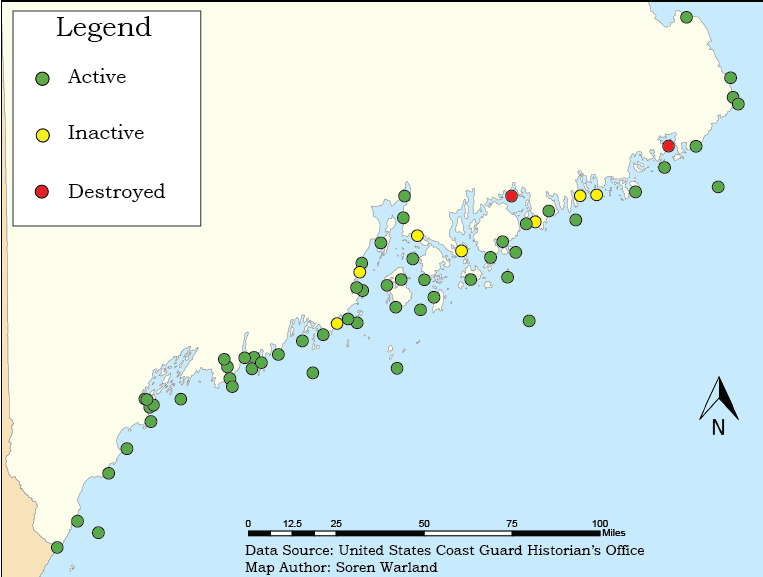
Map of All Lighthouses in Maine

Lighthouse preservation in Maine has been facilitated by the Maine Lighthouse Program, which arose in the aftermath of the Rockland-based Island Institute's successful but protracted negotiations to acquire the keeper's house of the Heron Neck Light Station. A program for facilitating transfers was proposed by Peter Ralston of the institute, and legislation was first introduced by George J. Mitchell; a subsequent bill submitted by Olympia Snowe in 1995 met with greater success and was signed into law late in 1996 as part of the coast guard authorization act. Under the program, thirty-six light stations were offered to qualified preservation and historical groups and local governments; applications for transfer were reviewed by a board set up at the state level, headed by Richard I. Rybacki, a retired USCG rear admiral. Four lights were to be transferred to the US Fish and Wildlife; twenty-eight other lights were transferred in the summer of 1998. Prior to this program, some lights in the state had already been sold to individuals following deactivation in the 1930s. The most notable of these is the Tenants Harbor Light, which was purchased by Andrew Wyeth in 1978.

If not otherwise noted, focal height and coordinates are taken from the United States Coast Guard Light List, while location and dates of activation, automation, and deactivation are taken from the United States Coast Guard Historical information site for lighthouses.

== Lighthouses ==
Name	Image	Location	Coordinates	Year first lit	Automated	Year deactivated	Current Lens	Focal Height
Avery Rock Light		Machias (Machias Bay)	44.654°N 67.344°W	1875	1926	1947 (Destroyed)	None	56 ft (17 m)
Baker Island Light		Cranberry Isles (Baker Island)	44.2381°N 68.1990°W	1828 (Former); 1855 (Current)	1966	Active	Fourth-order Fresnel	105 ft (32 m)
Bass Harbor Head Light		Tremont (Mount Desert Island)	44.2218°N 68.3373°W	1858	1974	Active	Fourth-order Fresnel	56 ft (17 m)
Bear Island Light		Cranberry Isles (Bear Island)	44.2838°N 68.270°W	1839 (Former); 1889 (Current)	1989	Active (Inactive: 1981–1989)	Plastic	100 ft (30 m)
Blue Hill Bay Light		Blue Hill (Blue Hill Bay)	44.2489°N 68.4977°W	1857 (Former); 1935 (Current)	1935	1935 (Former); Active (Current)	Unknown	25 ft (7.6 m)
Boon Island Light		York (Boon Island)	43.1214°N 70.4764°W	1811 (Former); 1855 (Current)	1980	Active	VRB-25	137 ft (42 m)
Browns Head Light		Vinalhaven (Browns Head)	44.1118°N 68.9095°W	1832 (Former); 1857 (Current)	1987	Active	Fifth-order Fresnel	39 ft (12 m)
Burnt Coat Harbor Light		Swan's Island (Hockamock Head)	44.1341°N 68.4472°W	1872	1975	Active	Unknown	75 ft (23 m)
Burnt Island Light		Boothbay Harbor (Burnt Island)	43.8252°N 69.6402°W	1821	1988	Active	Electrified beacon	61 ft (19 m)
Cape Elizabeth Lights		Cape Elizabeth (Casco Bay)	43.5661°N 70.2001°W (East tower)43.5642°N 70.2025°W (West tower)	1828 (West tower); 1874 (East tower)	1963 (East)	1924 (West); Active (East)	VRB-25	129 ft (39 m)
Cape Neddick Light		York (Cape Neddick)	43.1652°N 70.6078°W	1879	1987	Active	Fourth-order Fresnel	88 ft (27 m)
Crabtree Ledge Light		Frenchman Bay (Crabtree Neck)	44.470°N 68.203°W	1890	Never	1933 (Destroyed in 1950)	None	37 ft (11 m)
Cuckolds Light		Boothbay Harbor (Cuckold Islets)	43.7795°N 69.6500°W	1892 (Former); 1907 (Current)	1972	Active	VRB-25	59 ft (18 m)
Curtis Island Light		Camden (Penobscot Bay)	44.2014°N 69.0489°W	1835 (Former); 1896 (Current)	1972	Active	Unknown	52 ft (16 m)
Deer Island Thorofare Light		Stonington? (Penobscot Bay)	44.1344°N 68.7033°W	1857	1958	Active	250mm	52 ft (16 m)
Dice Head Light		Castine	44.3827°N 68.8186°W	1829	1937	Active (Inactive: 1937–2007)	Unknown	134 ft (41 m)
Doubling Point Range Lights		Arrowsic (Arrowsic Island)	43.8828°N 69.7957°W (Front light) 43.8848°N 69.7957°W (Rear light)	1898	1980	Active	Unknown	18 ft (5.5 m) (Front light); 33 ft (10 m) (Rear light)
Doubling Point Light		Arrowsic	43.8825°N 69.8068°W	1898	1988	Active	Fifth-order Fresnel	23 ft (7.0 m)
Eagle Island Light		Eagle Island (Penobscot Bay)	44.2176°N 68.7678°W	1838 (Former); 1858 (Current)	1959	Active	Fourth-order Fresnel	23 ft (7.0 m)
Egg Rock Light		Frenchman Bay	44.3539°N 68.1383°W	1875	1976	Active	VRB-25	64 ft (20 m)
Fort Point Light		Stockton Springs (Penobscot River)	44.4671°N 68.8117°W	1836 (Former); 1857 (Current)	1988	Active	Fourth-order Fresnel	88 ft (27 m)
Franklin Island Light		Franklin Island (Muscongus Bay)	43.8921°N 69.3746°W	1805 (Former); 1855 (Current)	1967	Active	250mm	57 ft (17 m)
Goat Island Light		Kennebunkport (Cape Porpoise)	43.3579°N 70.4251°W	1835 (Former); 1859 (Current)	1990	Active	300mm	38 ft (12 m)
Goose Rocks Light		North Haven (Penobscot Bay)	44.1354°N 68.8307°W	1890	1963	Active	250mm	51 ft (16 m)
Great Duck Island Light		Frenchboro (Great Duck Island)	44.1420°N 68.2458°W	1890	1986	Active	VRB-25	67 ft (20 m)
Grindel Point Light		Islesboro	44.2814°N 68.9431°W	1874	1934	Active (Inactive: 1934–1987)	250mm	67 ft (20 m)
Halfway Rock Light		Casco Bay	43.6558°N 70.0368°W	1871	1975	Active	VRB-25	76 ft (23 m)
Hendricks Head Light		Southport (Sheepscot River)	43.8226°N 69.6897°W	1829 (Former); 1875 (Current)	1951	Active (Inactive: 1933–1951)	250mm	43 ft (13 m)
Heron Neck Light		Vinalhaven (Penobscot Bay)	44.0251°N 68.8622°W	1854	1984	Active	Fifth-order Fresnel	92 ft (28 m)
Indian Island Light		Rockport	44.1655°N 69.0610°W	1850 (Former); 1875 (Current)	Never	1934	None	Unknown
Isle Au Haut Light		Isle au Haut	44.0647°N 68.6514°W	1907	1934	Active	250mm	48 ft (15 m)
Ladies Delight Light		Winthrop, Maine (Lake Cobbosseecontee)		1908	1930s	Active	Unknown	25 ft (7.6 m)
Libby Island Light		Machiasport (Machias Bay)	44.5683°N 67.3674°W	1822 (Former); 1848 (Current)	1974	Active	VRB-25	91 ft (28 m)
Little River Light		Cutler	44.6509°N 67.1921°W	1846 (Former); 1876 (Current)	1975	Active (Inactive: 1975–2001)	VRB-25	56 ft (17 m)
Lubec Channel Light		Lubec	44.8421°N 66.9766°W	1890	1939	Active	155mm	53 ft (16 m)
Machias Seal Island		Washington County, Maine (mouth of Bay of Fundy)	44.5018°N 67.1018°W	1832 (Former); 1914 (Current)	1995	Active	Unknown	65 ft (20 m)
Marshall Point Light		Port Clyde	43.9174°N 69.2613°W	1832 (Former); 1858 (Current)	1980	Active	300mm	30 ft (9.1 m)
Matinicus Rock Light		Matinicus Isle	43.7835°N 68.8550°W	1827 (Former); 1846 (Current towers)	1983	1924 (North tower); Active (South tower)	VRB-25	90 ft (27 m)
Monhegan Island Light		Monhegan (Monhegan Island)	43.7648°N 69.3158°W	1824 (Former); 1850 (Current)	1959	Active	VRB-25	178 ft (54 m)
Moose Peak Light		Mistake Island	44.4746°N 67.5320°W	1827 (Former); 1851 (Current)	1972	Active	DCB-24	72 ft (22 m)
Mount Desert Light		Mount Desert Rock (Near Mount Desert Island)	43.9686°N 68.1283°W	1830 (Former); 1847 (Current)	1977	Active	VRB-25	75 ft (23 m)
Narraguagus Light		Narraguagus Bay	44.456°N 67.8312°W	1853	Never	1934	None	54 ft (16 m)
Nash Island Light		Pleasant Bay	44.4643°N 67.7473°W	1838 (Former); 1874 (Current)	1958	1982	None	51 ft (16 m)
Owls Head Light		Owls Head (Penobscot Bay)	44.0922°N 69.0440°W	1825	1989	Active	Fourth-order Fresnel	100 ft (30 m)
Pemaquid Point Light		Bristol	43.8368°N 69.5058°W	1827 (Former); 1857 (Current)	1934	Active	Fourth-order Fresnel	79 ft (24 m)
Perkins Island Light		Georgetown (Perkins Island)	43.7868°N 69.7852°W	1898	1959	Active	250mm	41 ft (12 m)
Petit Manan Light		Milbridge (Petit Island)	44.3676°N 67.8644°W	1817 (Former); 1855 (Current)	1972	Active	VRB-25	123 ft (37 m)
Pond Island Light		Kennebec River	43.7400°N 69.7703°W	1821 (Former); 1855 (Current)	1963	Active	250mm	52 ft (16 m)
Portland Breakwater Light		South Portland	43.6555°N 70.2349°W	1855 (Former); 1875 (Current)	1934	Active (Inactive: 1942–2002)	Unknown	30 ft (9.1 m)
Portland Head Light		Cape Elizabeth (Casco Bay)	43.6231°N 70.2079°W	1791	1989	Active	DCB-224	101 ft (31 m)
Prospect Harbor Point Light		Gouldsboro (Prospect Harbor)	44.4034°N 68.0130°W	1850 (Former); 1891 (Current)	1951	Active	Optic	42 ft (13 m)
Pumpkin Island Light		Deer Isle (Pumpkin Island)	44.3092°N 68.7428°W	1854	Never	1933	None	Unknown
Ram Island Ledge Light		Cape Elizabeth (Casco Bay)	43.6315°N 70.1874°W	1905	1959	Active	Third-order Fresnel	77 ft (23 m)
Ram Island Light		Boothbay Harbor	43.8038°N 69.5992°W	1883	1965	Active	Unknown	36 ft (11 m)
Rockland Harbor Breakwater Light		Rockland	44.1040°N 69.0775°W	1827 (Former); 1902 (Current)	1964	Active	VRB-25	39 ft (12 m)
Saddleback Ledge Light		Saddleback Ledge (Penobscot Bay)	44.0144°N 68.7264°W	1839	1954	Active	300mm	54 ft (16 m)
Saint Croix River Light		St. Croix River	45.1282°N 67.1338°W	1857 (Former); 1976 (Current)	1976	Active	Unknown	77 ft (23 m)
Seguin Light		Georgetown	43.7075°N 69.7580°W	1795 (Former); 1857 (Current)	1985	2019 (Temporary)	First-order Fresnel	180 ft (55 m)
Spring Point Ledge Light		South Portland	43.6521°N 70.2239°W	1897	1934	Active	Fifth-order Fresnel	54 ft (16 m)
Squirrel Point Light		Arrowsic (Arrowsic Island)	43.8165°N 69.8024°W	1898	1982	Active	250mm	25 ft (7.6 m)
Tenants Harbor Light		St. George (Southern Island)	43.9611°N 69.1848°W	1857	Never	1933	None	27 ft (8.2 m)
Two Bush Island Light		Two Bush Island (Penobscot Bay)	43.9642°N 69.0739°W	1897	1964	Active	VRB-25	65 ft (20 m)
West Quoddy Head Light		Lubec	44.8151°N 66.9507°W	1808 (Former); 1858 (Current)	1988	Active	Third-order Fresnel	83 ft (25 m)
Whaleback Light		Kittery (Piscataqua River)	43.0588°N 70.6963°W	1820 (Former); 1872 (Current)	1963	Active	VLB-44	59 ft (18 m)
Whitehead Light		St. George (Whitehead Island)	43.9787°N 69.1243°W	1807 (Former); 1857 (Current)	1982	Active	300mm	75 ft (23 m)
Whitlocks Mill Light		St. Croix River	45.1626°N 67.2274°W	1892 (Former); 1910 (Current)	1969	Active	VLB-44	32 ft (9.8 m)
Winter Harbor Light		Winter Harbor	44.3614°N 68.0876°W	1856	Never	1933	None	37 ft (11 m)
Wood Island Light		Biddeford (Biddeford Pool)	43.4569°N 70.3291°W	1808 (Former); 1858 (Current)	1986	Active	VLB-44	71 ft (22 m)
