= Drum Island =

Drum Island may refer to:

- Drum Island, on the Cooper River (South Carolina), Charleston, South Carolina, under the Cooper River Bridge
- Drum Island, slightly west of Port Albert, Victoria
- Drum Island, an island in Frenchboro, Maine, Hancock County on the Bass Harbor
- Drum Island, Citrus County, Florida
- Drum Island (band)
