= Pumpkin Island Light =

Lighthouse in Maine, US

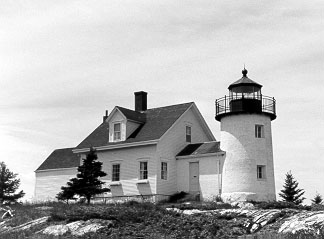
- US Coast Guard photo
- Location: Pumpkin Island, Deer Isle, Maine
- Coordinates: 44°18′33″N 68°44′34.4″W

Tower
- Constructed: 1854
- Foundation: Stone
- Construction: Brick
- Automated: 1930
- Height: 25 feet (7.6 m)
- Shape: Conical Tower
- Markings: White
- Heritage: National Register of Historic Places listed place

Light
- First lit: 1855
- Deactivated: 1933
- Lens: Fifth Order Fresnel Lens
- Pumpkin Island Light Station
- U.S. National Register of Historic Places
- U.S. Historic district
- Area: 3 acres (1.2 ha)
- MPS: Light Stations of Maine MPS
- NRHP reference No.: 87002537
- Added to NRHP: February 1, 1988

Pumpkin Island Light is a lighthouse on Pumpkin Island, at the northwestern entrance to Eggemoggin Reach, a channel running northwest to southeast between Penobscot Bay and Blue Hill Bay on the central-eastern coast of Maine. The light station was established in 1854 and discontinued in 1933. It was listed on the National Register of Historic Places as Pumpkin Island Light Station on February 1, 1988. The island and former light station are privately owned.

== Description and history ==
Pumpkin Island is roughly 3 acres (1.2 ha) in size and is located off the northern tip of Little Deer Island on the east side of Penobscot Bay. The channel to the east of the island, Eggemoggin Reach, connects Penobscot Bay to Blue Hill Bay further east. The island was chosen (in preference to a site on the mainland to the north) in 1852 to be the site of the station marking the northwestern end of the channel. Construction began in 1854, and the station entered service the following year.

The tower is a round brick structure, measuring 22 feet (6.7 m) from its base to the light. It is capped by an octagonal lantern house that was installed in about 1890, replacing an original, larger unit. An iron walkway with a railing surrounds the lantern house. There are two windows in the tower, and a frame workroom to the south connects it to the keeper's house. The house is a small, three-bay, single-story, wood-frame clapboarded structure, with a single gabled dormer on the east side and a wing (added in 1887) extending to the south. A small brick oil house stands a short way off, and there is a wood-frame boathouse, built in 1885 and enlarged in 1906, at the boat slip on the north end of the island.

The light station was built as part of a comprehensive plan for providing aids to navigation on the east side of Penobscot Bay that was developed in the early 1850s. The light was operated until 1933, when it was discontinued and sold. The island and buildings have remained in private hands since that time.

== See also ==
- List of lighthouses in Maine
- National Register of Historic Places listings in Hancock County, Maine
