= Mount Desert Light =

Lighthouse in Maine, US

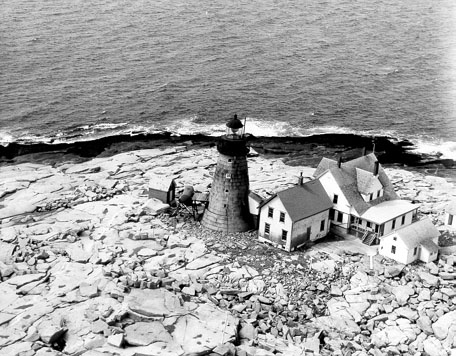
- The 1847 (current) tower with the 1892 keeper's house
- Location: Mount Desert Island, Frenchboro, United States
- Coordinates: 43°58′07″N 68°07′42″W

Tower
- Constructed: 1830
- Construction: granite
- Automated: 1977
- Height: 17.5 m (57 ft)
- Shape: conical
- Markings: Unpainted (tower), black (lantern)
- Heritage: National Register of Historic Places listed place
- Fog signal: HORN: 2 every 30s operates continuously

Light
- First lit: 1847
- Focal height: 75 ft (23 m)
- Lens: third order Fresnel lens (1858–Unknown), VRB-25 (1995–)
- Range: 20 nmi (37 km; 23 mi)
- Characteristic: Fl W 15s
- Mount Desert Light Station
- U.S. National Register of Historic Places
- U.S. Historic district
- Built: 1847
- Architect: Alexander Parris; US Army Corps of Engineers
- MPS: Light Stations of Maine MPS
- NRHP reference No.: 88000155
- Added to NRHP: March 14, 1988

Mount Desert Light is a lighthouse on Mount Desert Rock, a small island about 18 nautical miles (33 km; 21 mi) south of Mount Desert Island, in the U.S. state of Maine. While the first light station was established in 1830, the current lighthouse was built in 1847. It was listed on the National Register of Historic Places as Mount Desert Light Station in 1988. It is currently owned and operated by the College of the Atlantic, located in Bar Harbor, Maine.

== History ==
The conical granite structure was one in a series of lighthouses in Maine designed by architect Alexander Parris. A bell tower and fog bell were added in 1858, as well as a new lantern with a 3rd order Fresnel lens. The bell was replaced by a steam-powered whistle in 1889. The present keeper's house was built in 1892. The station was electrified in 1931 and automated in 1977; around that time, the lantern was removed and the lens was replaced aero-beacon. In 1985, a replica of the lantern was installed, and circa (c.) 1995, the aero-beacon was replaced with a VRB-25 lighthouse system.

The station was transferred in 1998 to the College of the Atlantic as part of the Maine Lights program. It is used as an ecology research station, primarily known for its work on finback and humpback whales.

The station is both farther offshore and more exposed than any other lighthouse on the east coast. It sustained serious damage during Hurricane Daisy (1962) and Hurricane Bill (2009). In August 2009, the boathouse was washed away, two walls of the generator building were ripped apart, and all the furniture and equipment on the first floor of the lightkeeper's house were ruined when it flooded almost to the ceiling. The college research station was subsequently closed until August 2010.

== Keepers ==
- Esais Preble (1833–1835)
- William Preble (assistant, 1833–1835)
- Benjamin Ward Jr. (1841–?)
- Jacob L. Richardson (1848–1850)
- David King (1850–1853)
- Rufus King (1853–1859)
- William H. Ward (assistant, 1855–1858)
- John Dolliver Jr. (assistant, 1858–1859)
- George Booth (1859–1860)
- B. Thurber (assistant, 1859–1864)
- Joseph Hopkins (1860–1861)
- William E. Holden (1861–1864)
- Seth H. Higgins (assistant 1864–1865, principal keeper 1865–1867)
- David Rollins (assistant, 1865–1867)
- Dan Ladd (assistant, 1865)
- J. A. Williken (1867–1868)
- William Gilley (assistant, 1867)
- Dan B. Eaton (assistant, 1867–1871)
- Otis W. Kent (1868–1872)
- Perry W. Richardson (assistant, 1868–1870 and 1871–1872)
- Amos B. Newman (assistant, 1870–1872, principal keeper 1872–1881)
- Mark W. Hodgson (assistant, 1872–1882)
- William P. Sawyer (second assistant 1872–1878)
- James A. Morris (assistant, 1874–1876)
- Frank Collins (assistant, 1876–1877)
- Howard P. Robbins (second assistant 1878–1882)
- James A. Morris (1881–1882)
- Thomas R. Milan (1882–1902)
- William Stanley (assistant 1882–1883)
- Benjamin Maddox (assistant, 1883–1888)
- Howard M. Gilley (second assistant 1883–1887)
- Lewis F. Sawyer (second assistant 1887–1888, first assistant 1888–1889)
- Willis Dolliver (second assistant 1887–1890, first assistant 1890–1891)
- William J, Newman (second assistant 1890, first assistant 1890)
- Thomas R. Savage (second assistant 1891–1892)
- Orrin L. Milan (second assistant 1892–1895, first assistant 1895–1897)
- Charles Thurston (second assistant 1895–1897, first assistant (1897–1899)
- Fred M. Robbins (second assistant 1898–1899, first assistant 1899–1902, principal keeper (1902–1911)
- Joseph M. Gray (assistant, c. 1900)
- Bert Richard (assistant, c. 1901)
- Herbert P. Richardson (second assistant c. 1902)
- Charles H. Newman (assistant, c. 1902–1908)
- William H. C. Dodge (second assistant c. 1902–1908)
- Vinal O. Beal (second assistant 1909–1910, first assistant 1910–1911, principal keeper 1911–1918)
- W. P. Kent (assistant, 1909–1910)
- Wilbert F. Lurney (second assistant 1910, first assistant 1911-unknown)
- Charles A. Radley (second assistant 1911-unknown);
- Arthur Edward Ginn (c. 1918-early 1920s)
- George York (1928–1936)
- Robert G. Wass (c. 1930s)
- Everett Quinn (assistant c. 1935)
- H. C. Day (assistant c. 1935).
- Ralph Demons (c. 1950)
- Russ Allyson USCG MK2 (c. 1971-72)

== See also ==
- National Register of Historic Places listings in Hancock County, Maine
- List of lighthouses in Maine
