= Dyce Head Light =

Lighthouse in Maine, US

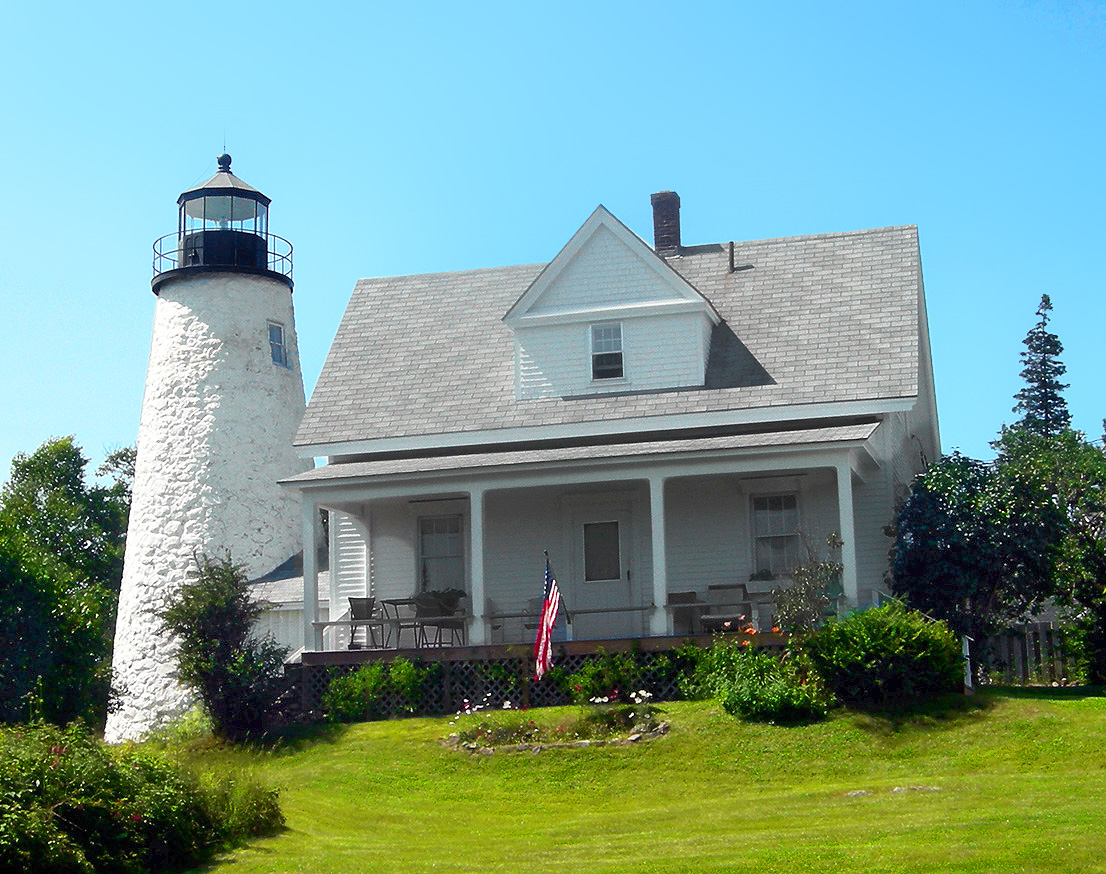
- Location: Castine, Maine
- Coordinates: 44°22′57.6″N 68°49′7.86″W

Tower
- Constructed: 1829
- Automated: 1937
- Shape: Rubble Tower
- Markings: White
- Heritage: National Register of Historic Places contributing property
- Fog signal: none

Light
- Deactivated: 1937-2008
- Focal height: 134 feet (41 m)
- Range: 11 nautical miles (20 km; 13 mi)
- Characteristic: Fl W 6s
- Dyce Head Light
- U.S. Historic district – Contributing property
- Part of: Castine Historic District (ID73000240)
- Designated CP: February 23, 1973

Dyce Head Light is a lighthouse located at the southernmost point of the Castine peninsula in Hancock County, Maine. Built in 1829 to guide vessels along the Penobscot River and into Castine Harbor, the lighthouse served the region's flourishing shipbuilding and lumber trade until its deactivation in 1937. After a 475-foot (145 m) skeleton tower that replaced it was destroyed by a microburst in 2007, the original lighthouse was reactivated in 2008 and continues to operate today.

The lighthouse is listed on the National Register of Historic Places as a contributing property to the Castine Historic District, which was designated in 1973.

== History ==
=== Maritime context and construction ===
By the early 19th century, Castine had become a major commercial hub at the mouth of the Penobscot River. The town served as an important entrepôt for American fishing fleets heading to the Grand Banks of Newfoundland and was central to Maine's booming shipbuilding and lumber industries. Eastern Maine dominated the national lumber trade before the American Civil War, with timber from the Penobscot watershed being transported downriver to ports like Bangor and Castine for shipment to national and international markets.

As shipbuilding and lumber traffic on the Penobscot River flourished, Congress appropriated $5,000 on May 23, 1828, for the construction of a light station at Dice Head. The site chosen was the southernmost point of the Castine peninsula, approximately two miles east of the northern end of Islesboro. The location was on land formerly owned by the Dyce family, though both "Dyce" and "Dice" spellings have been used historically, with "Dice" becoming more common over time.

=== Early operations ===
Construction of the lighthouse was completed by late 1828. The structure consisted of a conical rubble stone tower measuring 42 feet from base to focal plane, topped by an octagonal wrought-iron lantern housing ten lamps with 14-inch reflectors. An adjacent one-and-one-half-story rubblestone dwelling was built to house the lighthouse keeper and his family.

The lighthouse first exhibited its fixed white light on the evening of November 5, 1828, showing from 129 feet above mean high water. Jacob Sherburne, a former ship captain, was appointed as the first lighthouse keeper. A newspaper notice announced that the light would commence operation that evening, marking the beginning of more than a century of service to mariners navigating the approaches to Castine Harbor.

=== Operational challenges ===
Despite its important role, the lighthouse faced criticism regarding its effectiveness and location from early in its operational history. In October 1835, Captain Henry D. Hunter of the U.S. revenue cutter Jackson inspected the facility and recommended relocating the light, stating that it should be positioned on the northern head of Holbrook Island at the eastern entrance to Castine Harbor, where it would better serve as both a guide up the Penobscot River and a harbor light.

I.W.P. Lewis also questioned the lighthouse's placement after visiting in 1842, noting that while useful as a harbor light for Castine, its position far east of the central line of Penobscot Bay limited its utility as a bay light, as projecting land intercepted the light and restricted its visibility.

=== Lighthouse keepers ===
The lighthouse was staffed by a succession of keepers throughout its active period:

- Jacob Sherburne (1828–1837) - former ship captain who served as the first keeper
- Robert McFarland (1837–1841)
- Benjamin Harriman (1841–1845, 1849–1853)
- William Hutchings Jr. (1845–1849, 1853–1858)
- Meltiah Jordan (1858–1861)
- Samuel Dorr (1861–1864)
- P.P. Cunningham (1864–1865)
- George H. Webb (1865–1887)
- Charles A. Gott (1887–1911)
- Adelbert H. Gott (1911)
- Edward T. Spurling (1911–1930)
- Vurney L. King (1930–1937) - the last keeper

Notable among the keepers was Vurney L. King, who on July 23, 1931, rescued a woman who had been marooned on a rock for five to six hours after the tide came in. The woman was unable to swim and was successfully removed from her precarious position by Keeper King.

=== Automation and deactivation ===
The lighthouse was electrified and automated by 1935 as maritime traffic in the area diminished and shipping patterns changed. Despite automation, Keeper King and his wife Maude continued to live at the station as caretakers through at least 1940.

In 1937, the United States Lighthouse Service discontinued the Dice Head Light station, replacing it with an automated light mounted on a steel skeleton tower positioned closer to the shore, approximately 475 feet (145 m) to the south of the original lighthouse. The keeper's dwelling and surrounding land were transferred to the Town of Castine at this time, while the lighthouse tower itself was turned over to the town in 1956.

== Physical description ==
=== Architecture ===
Dyce Head Light exemplifies early 19th-century lighthouse construction techniques employed along the Maine coast. The 42-foot conical tower is constructed of local rubble stone, a building method common to the region that utilized readily available materials and provided durability against harsh coastal conditions. The tower's design reflects the practical engineering approach of the period, with thick stone walls tapering toward the top to provide stability while minimizing weight at the structure's apex.

The octagonal wrought-iron lantern that caps the tower represents typical lighthouse technology of the late 1820s. Originally equipped with ten lamps and 14-inch reflectors, this configuration was designed to produce a fixed white light visible from the approaches to Castine Harbor and the Penobscot River entrance.

=== Keeper's dwelling ===
The original keeper's dwelling, constructed simultaneously with the lighthouse, was a modest one-and-one-half-story structure built of the same rubble stone as the tower. This residential building housed the lighthouse keepers and their families throughout the facility's operational period, providing living quarters in close proximity to the light station for effective maintenance and operation.

The dwelling suffered significant damage in a fire that occurred in 1999, which burned the roof and caused considerable damage to the structure. Following public debate, the Town of Castine decided to repair rather than rebuild the residence. Restoration work was completed by September 2000, performed by Philbrook and Spinney of Bangor.

== Modern history ==
=== Town ownership and restoration ===
Since acquiring the lighthouse property, the Town of Castine has undertaken several significant restoration efforts to preserve this historic structure. In the 1990s, inspections revealed interior deterioration within the tower that required specialized repair techniques. A process called "slurry injection" was employed, involving the injection of clay or cement slurry through holes drilled in the tower walls to address internal structural problems.

In 1997, Castine voters approved spending $98,000 for lighthouse repairs, with an additional $25,000 approved in March 1998. The project also received $52,000 from the Maine Historic Preservation Committee. Marty Nally, a contractor from the Campbell Construction Group, carried out the renovation work.

To help offset maintenance costs and deter vandalism, the town has rented the restored keeper's dwelling to live-in caretakers, ensuring ongoing oversight of the historic property.

=== Reactivation ===
On September 2007, a rare meteorological event called a microburst—a localized, intense downdraft of air—struck the Castine area and destroyed the skeletal steel tower that had replaced the original lighthouse in 1937. Rather than rebuild the skeleton tower, the United States Coast Guard decided to reactivate the historic 1829 lighthouse as an active aid to navigation.

A 300-millimeter optic was initially installed in the original tower, but this was replaced on January 1, 2008, with a 250-millimeter optic that exhibits a white flash every six seconds. This reactivation marked the return of Dyce Head Light to active service after a 71-year period of decommission, making it once again a functional navigational aid for mariners entering Castine Harbor and the Penobscot River.

== Cultural and historical significance ==
=== Role in Castine's maritime heritage ===
Dyce Head Light represents an important tangible link to Castine's golden age as a maritime commercial center. During the early to mid-19th century, Castine ranked as one of the most prosperous towns per capita in the United States, with six active shipyards and extensive shipping operations. The lighthouse served the vessels that made this prosperity possible, guiding lumber ships, fishing vessels, and merchant craft safely into one of Maine's most important harbors.

The lighthouse's period of service coincided with Maine's dominance in American shipbuilding and the lumber trade. Vessels departing Castine carried Maine lumber to markets throughout the United States and internationally, while the town served as a major entrepôt for fishing fleets bound for the Grand Banks. The lighthouse thus played a supporting role in economic activities that were central to both Maine's development and the broader American maritime economy.

=== Relationship to Castine Historic District ===
Dyce Head Light is a contributing property to the Castine Historic District. The town of Castine was listed on the National Register of Historic Places in 1973 for its concentration of historic architecture and its role in American colonial and maritime history.

The historic district encompasses not only the lighthouse but also the remains of British and American fortifications, Federal and Greek Revival mansions from the town's prosperous maritime period, and the campus of Maine Maritime Academy. This concentration of historic resources makes Castine unique among New England coastal communities and underscores the lighthouse's role as part of a larger historic landscape.

=== Educational and tourism value ===
Today, Dyce Head Light serves both its practical function as an active aid to navigation and its cultural role as a historic landmark accessible to the public. The lighthouse grounds are open daily until sunset, with a public footpath providing access around the tower and affording views of Penobscot Bay and the surrounding coastline.

The lighthouse's proximity to Maine Maritime Academy, located less than a mile away, provides educational opportunities for students studying maritime history, navigation, and marine sciences. The academy's presence in Castine creates a natural connection between the historic maritime past represented by the lighthouse and contemporary maritime education and research.

== Current status ==
Dyce Head Light remains an active aid to navigation under Coast Guard oversight, exhibiting a white flash every six seconds from its 250-millimeter optic. The lighthouse property is owned and maintained by the Town of Castine, which continues to rent the keeper's dwelling to help fund ongoing preservation efforts.

The lighthouse is easily accessible to visitors via Route 166 (Battle Avenue) in Castine. While the keeper's dwelling is privately occupied, the lighthouse grounds are open to the public, and a footpath allows visitors to walk around the tower and enjoy views of Penobscot Bay and the approach to Castine Harbor.

As both a functional lighthouse and a historic landmark, Dyce Head Light continues to serve the maritime community while preserving an important chapter in Maine's coastal heritage for future generations.

== See also ==
- List of lighthouses in Maine
- Castine Historic District
- Maine Maritime Academy
- Penobscot River
- Castine, Maine
