= Minturn, Maine =

Village on Swan's Island, Hancock County, Maine

- Village
- Interactive map of Minturn, Maine
- Coordinates: 44°8′33.30″N 68°26′11.07″W
- Country: United States
- State: Maine
- County: Hancock
- Town: Swan's Island
- Elevation: 0 ft (0 m)
- Time zone: EST (UTC−05:00)
  - Summer (DST): EDT (UTC−04:00)
- ZIP Code: 04685
- Area code: 207
- GNIS feature ID: 579989

Minturn is a small village on the south side of Swan's Island, a part of Hancock County, Maine, United States. The decline of fishing in general and of the local population has caused the village to dwindle. Its post office was consolidated with the Swans Island post office (ZIP code 04685).

Swan's Island is accessible by the State of Maine ferry service from Bass Harbor, on Mount Desert Island, home to Acadia National Park.
