= Great Duck Island Light =

Lighthouse in Maine, US

Great Duck Island Light Great Duck Island Light
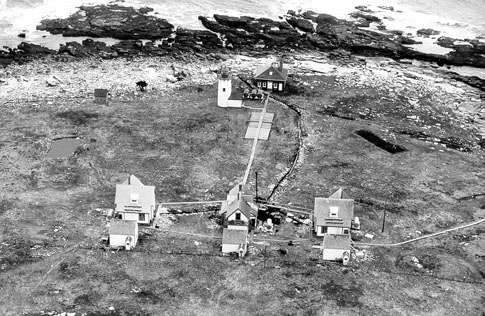
- US Coast Guard photo
- Location: Great Duck Island, Maine
- Coordinates: 44°8′31.129″N 68°14′44.947″W

Tower
- Constructed: 1890
- Foundation: Timber and stone
- Construction: Brick and granite
- Automated: 1986
- Height: 13 m (43 ft)
- Shape: Cylindrical
- Markings: White with black lantern
- Heritage: National Register of Historic Places listed place
- Fog signal: HORN: 1 every 15s operates continuously

Light
- Focal height: 67 feet (20 m)
- Lens: 5th order Fresnel lens (original), VRB-25 (current)
- Range: 19 nautical miles (35 km; 22 mi)
- Characteristic: Fl R 5s
- Great Duck Island Light Station
- U.S. National Register of Historic Places
- U.S. Historic district
- Nearest city: Frenchboro, Maine
- Area: 11 acres (4.5 ha)
- Built: 1890
- Architect: US Army Corps of Engineers
- MPS: Light Stations of Maine MPS
- NRHP reference No.: 88000159
- Added to NRHP: March 14, 1988

Great Duck Island Light is a lighthouse on Great Duck Island in the town of Frenchboro, Maine, USA. Established in 1890, the light marks the approach to Blue Hill Bay and the southern approaches to Mount Desert Island on the central coast of Maine. The light was listed on the National Register of Historic Places as Great Duck Island Light Station on March 14, 1988. The light is an active aid to navigation maintained by the United States Coast Guard; the property is owned by the College of the Atlantic, which operates a research station there.

== Description and history ==
Great Duck Island is a small 237 acres (96 ha) island, located in the Gulf of Maine about 9 miles (14 km) south of Mount Desert Island off the coast of central Maine. The light station occupies a roughly 11-acre (4.5 ha) parcel at the southern tip of the island. Five buildings (out of a larger number built) make up the station: a tower, keeper's house, fog station house, oil house, and a small shed.

The tower, built in 1890, is a cylindrical brick structure 35 feet 6 inches (10.82 m) in height, with an attached workroom. It is capped by a circular iron railing, which surrounds the ten-sided lantern house. The gable-roofed workroom extends to the west. Just south of the tower is the square brick hip-roofed fog signal building, also built in 1890. A small brick oil house stands east of the tower. Toward the northern end of the property is the 1890 keeper's house, one of three built and the only one to survive. It is a 1½ story wood-frame structure, with clapboard siding and a dormered gable roof. The shed, which also appears to date to 1890, stands northeast of the house.

The station was established in 1890, a time when Mount Desert Island was becoming a popular resort destination. The light was first magnified by a fifth-order lens, which was replaced by a fourth-order lens in 1902. The light was automated in 1986. The fog station was originally operated by steam and powered by coal, for which an engine house, coal bunk, and rain catchment house were built. These facilities were torn down by the Coast Guard when the station was automated.

Most of Great Duck Island was purchased in joint tenancy by the state and the Nature Conservancy in 1984. The station property was acquired in 1997 by the College of the Atlantic, which established the Alice Eno Field Research Station to perform research on the large bird population that the island supports. The keeper's house is used as a residence by student researchers.

== See also ==
- National Register of Historic Places listings in Hancock County, Maine
