= James Gower =

American Roman Catholic priest

Rev. James Gower (August 17, 1922 – December 17, 2012) was an American Roman Catholic priest and peace activist. Gower and his former high school classmate, businessman Les Brewer, co-founded the College of the Atlantic, a private, liberal arts college in Mount Desert Island, Maine, in 1969.

== Early life and education ==
James Gower was born in 1922 in Noank, Connecticut. He graduated from Bar Harbor High School in Bar Harbor, Maine, in 1940, and enrolled at the University of Notre Dame. Gower enlisted in the United States Navy during World War II and was later ordained a Catholic priest in 1953.

== Career ==
Gower served as a Catholic chaplain for Bates College, Husson College, the University of Maine in Orono, Maine, as well as at Bangor International Airport. He served as a parish priest at Sacred Heart Roman Catholic Parish in Waterville, Maine, for fifteen years. Father Gower has served as Catholic parishes in Bar Harbor, Bucksport, Castine, Lewiston, Northeast Harbor, Portland, Springvale and Stonington before retiring from full-time work in the parishes in 1992. However, he remained active as a priest serving as the temporary, interim pastor at a parish in Dexter, Maine, in 2000 and Ellsworth, Maine, in 2002. According to Bill Slavick, Gower was a peace activist within Pax Christi, an international Catholic peace movement.

In 1968, Father Gower and his former football teammate from Bar Harbor High School, businessman Les Brewer, conceived the idea for the College of the Atlantic. The Mount Desert Island residents wanted a four-year college to stimulate the island's economy during the off-season, when revenue from tourism declined. Brewer and Gower founded the school in 1969. Three other Mount Desert residents were also involved in the establishment of the college: Bernard K. "Sonny" Cough, Richard Lewis and Robert Smith.

Gower proposed "Acadia Peace College" as the original name for the school, though this was rejected. The College of the Atlantic began offering its first classes in 1972 with an enrollment of just 32 students. The institution now has approximately 300 students, as of the 2012–2013 school year. Since its establishment, the College of the Atlantic has offered only one academic major, human ecology. Gower helped to create the curriculum for the college and its academic programs.

== Death ==
Father Gower died on December 17, 2012, at an assisted living facility in Bar Harbor, Maine, at the age of 90. Darron Collins, the current President of the College of the Atlantic, noted that Gower "was a moral and inspirational beacon for the college in some of our roughest years and toughest times" in an email to faculty and staff announcing his death.
