= Les Brewer =

American businessman (1922–2019)

Les Brewer (April 22, 1922 – August 23, 2019) was an American businessman who co-founded the College of the Atlantic, a private, liberal arts college located in Mount Desert Island, Maine, in 1969.

Brewer attended Bar Harbor High School in Bar Harbor, Maine. In 1968, Brewer and his friend and former high school football teammate, Father James Gower, conceived the idea of a four-year college to be located on Mount Desert Island. Mount Desert Island residents had wanted a four-year college, with an environmental focus, to stimulate the island's economy during the off-season, when revenue from tourism declined. Brewer and Gower founded the school in 1969. Three other Mount Desert residents were also involved in the establishment of the college: Bernard K. "Sonny" Cough, Richard Lewis and Robert Smith.

The College of the Atlantic began offering its first classes in 1972 with an enrollment of just 32 students. The institution now has approximately 350 undergraduate students and 6 graduate students, as of the 2012–2013 school year. Since its establishment, the College of the Atlantic has offered only one academic major, human ecology.

Les was also the president of the Bar Harbor Village Improvement Association for over 35 years.
