= Blue Hill Bay Light =

Lighthouse in Maine, US

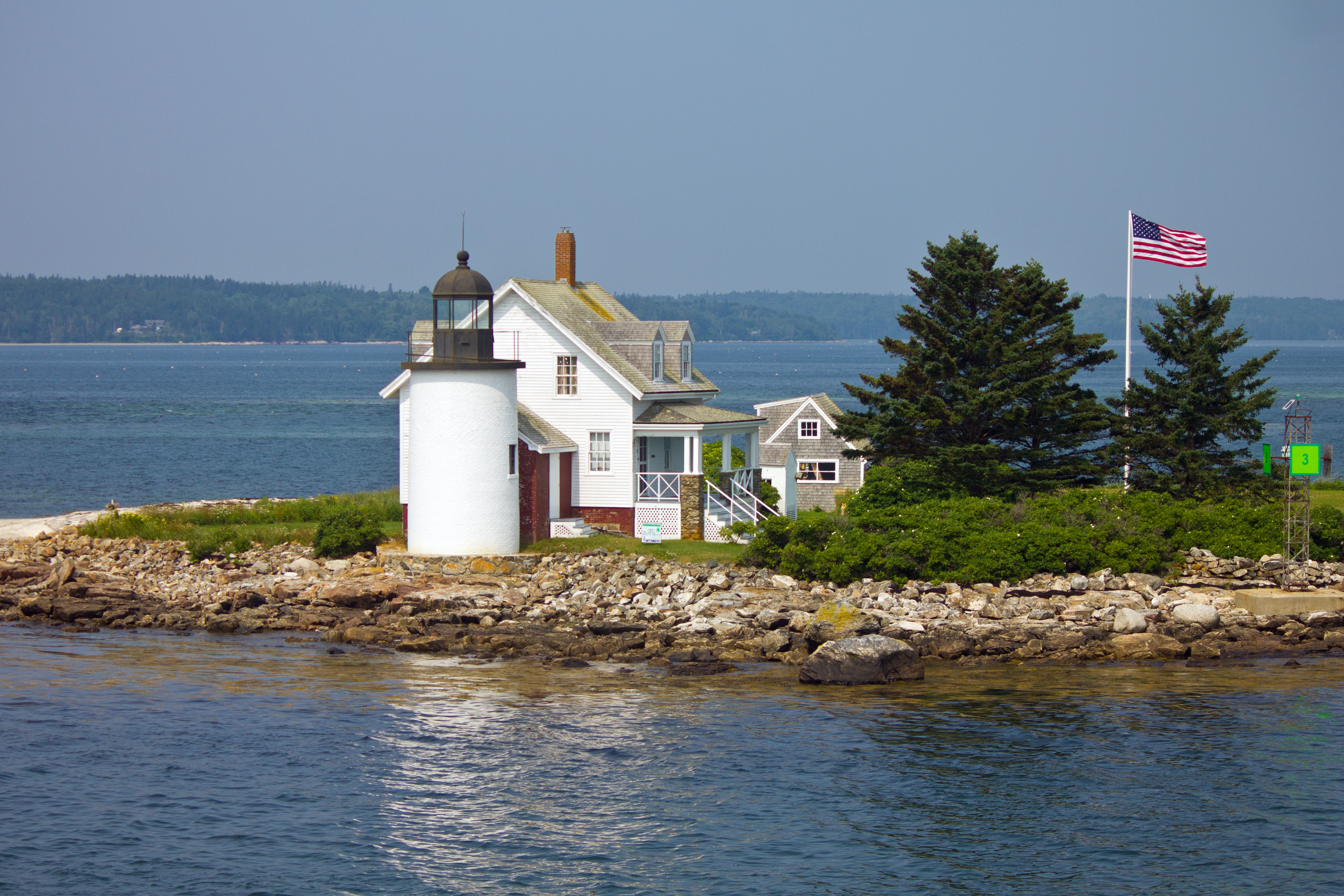
- Location: Blue Hill Bay, Maine
- Coordinates: 44°14′55.6″N 68°29′52.4″W

Tower
- Constructed: 1857; 168 years ago
- Automated: 1935
- Height: 6.5 m (21 ft)
- Shape: Skeleton Tower
- Markings: Square Green Daymark
- Fog signal: none

Light
- First lit: 1935 (current structure)
- Focal height: 25 feet (7.6 m)
- Range: 5 nautical miles (9.3 km; 5.8 mi)
- Characteristic: Fl G 4s

Blue Hill Bay Light is a lighthouse on Green Island in Blue Hill Bay, Maine. It was first established in 1857. The present skeleton structure was built in 1935. It is also known as "Sand Island Light" or “Eggemoggin Light".

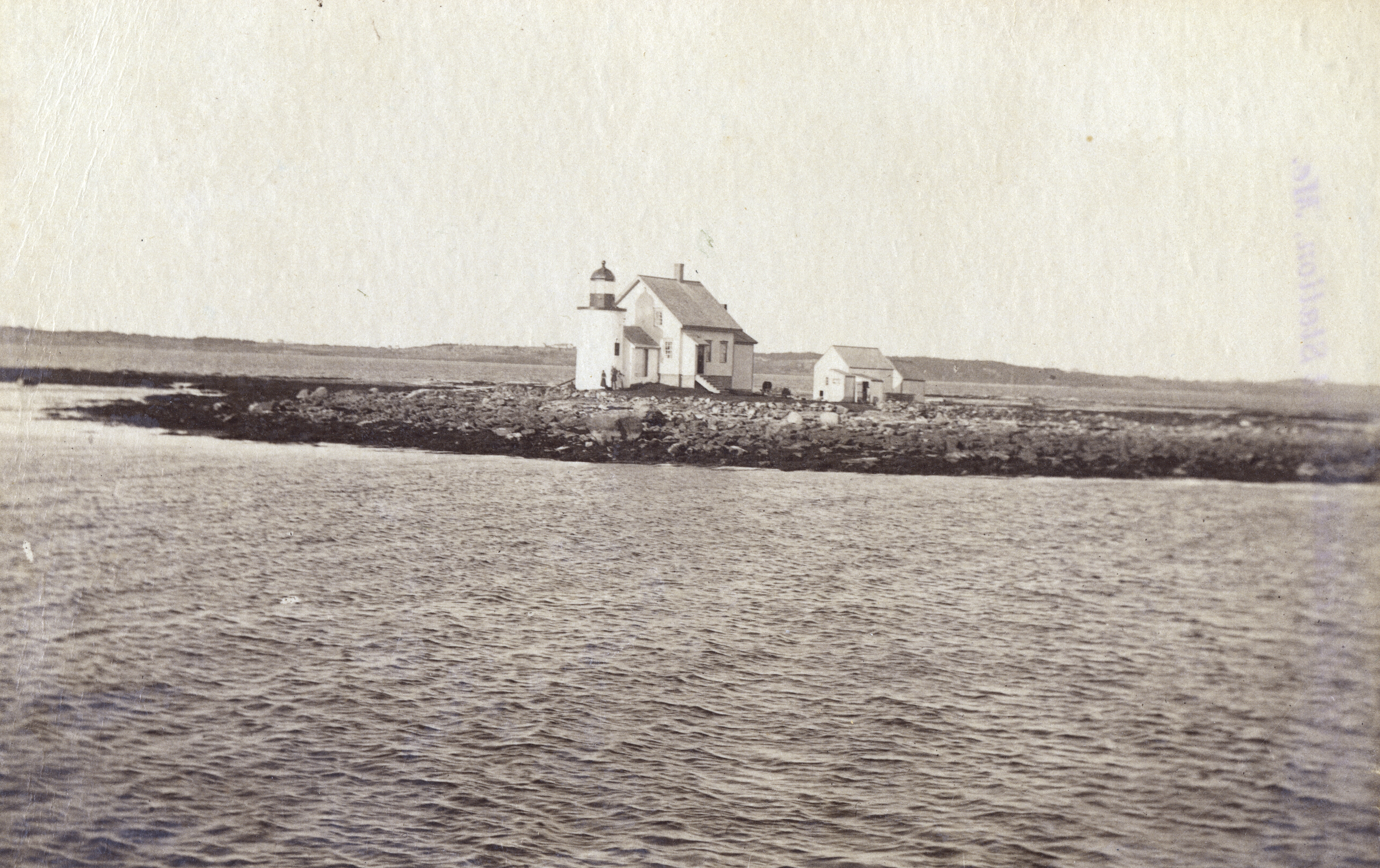
Blue Hill Bay Light photographed between 1913 and 1939

The original 1857 structure still stands near the current light. It is a white cylindrical tower with an attached keeper's residence.

The lighthouse and cottage were purchased, as part of the purchase of Green Island and its associated land, in 2018 by Green Island Lighthouse, LLC.

== Keepers ==
- Moses T. Graves (1856 – 1861)
- Isaac Smith (1861 – 1870)
- John Staples (1870 – 1877)
- Adelbert G. Webster (1877 – 1882)
- Howard P. Robbins (1882 – 1888)
- Roscoe G. Lopaus (1888 – 1895)
- Levi L. Farnham (1895 – 1900)
- Edward K. Tapley (1900 – 1915)
- William H.C. Dodge (1916 – 1920)
- Alvah Robinson (1921)
- Roscoe M. Chandler (1924 – 1932)
- Justin A. Foss (1932 – 1934)
