= Pond Island Light =

Lighthouse in Maine, US

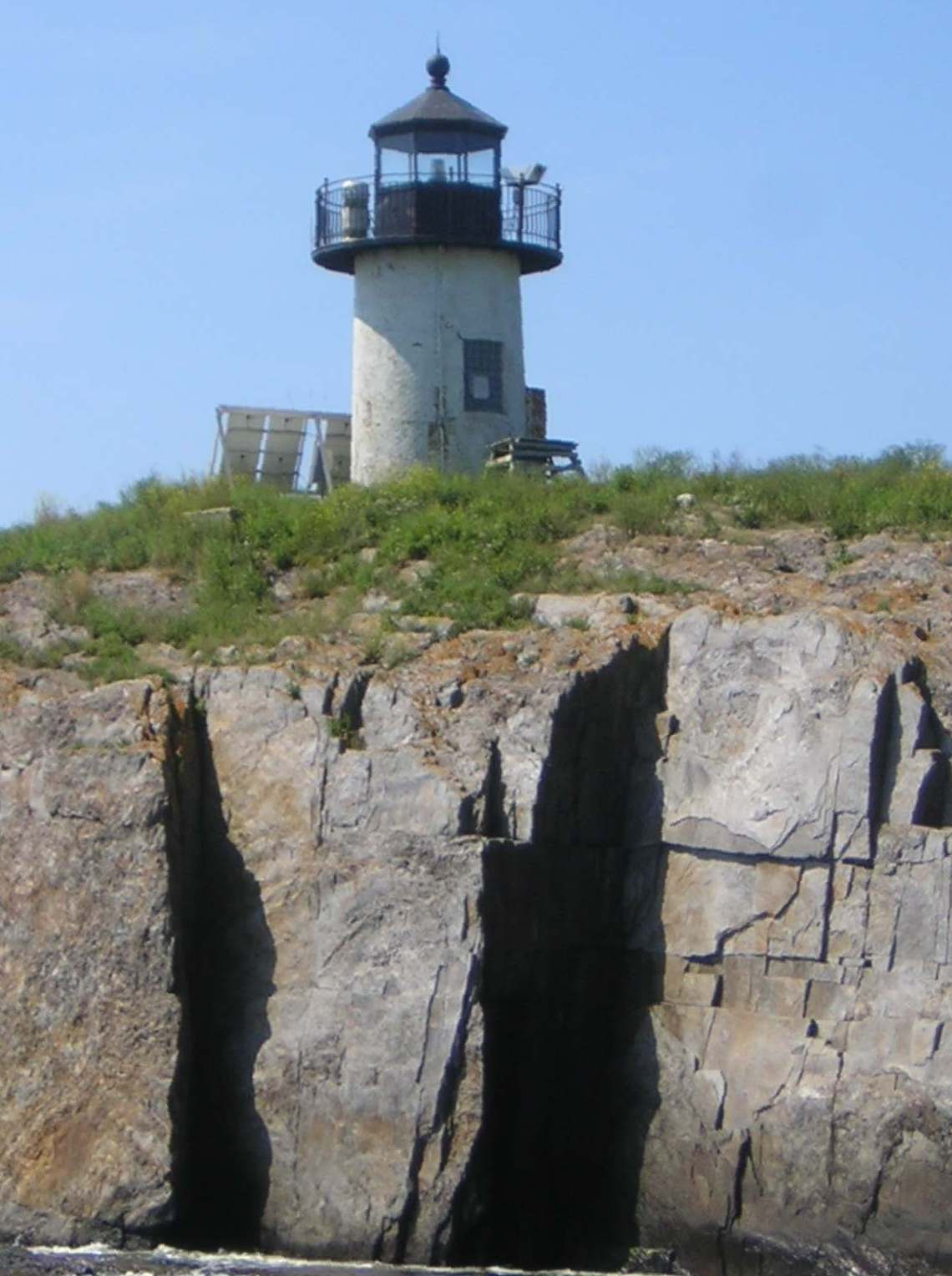
- Location: Kennebec River Entrance, Maine
- Coordinates: 43°44′24.13″N 69°46′13.09″W

Tower
- Constructed: 1821
- Foundation: Granite blocks
- Construction: Brick
- Automated: 1963
- Height: 6 m (20 ft)
- Shape: Cylindrical Tower
- Markings: White
- Fog signal: HORN: 2 every 30s

Light
- First lit: 1855 (current structure)
- Focal height: 52 feet (16 m)
- Lens: 5th order Fresnel lens (original), 9.8 inches (250 mm) (current)
- Range: 9 nautical miles (17 km; 10 mi)
- Characteristic: Iso W 6s

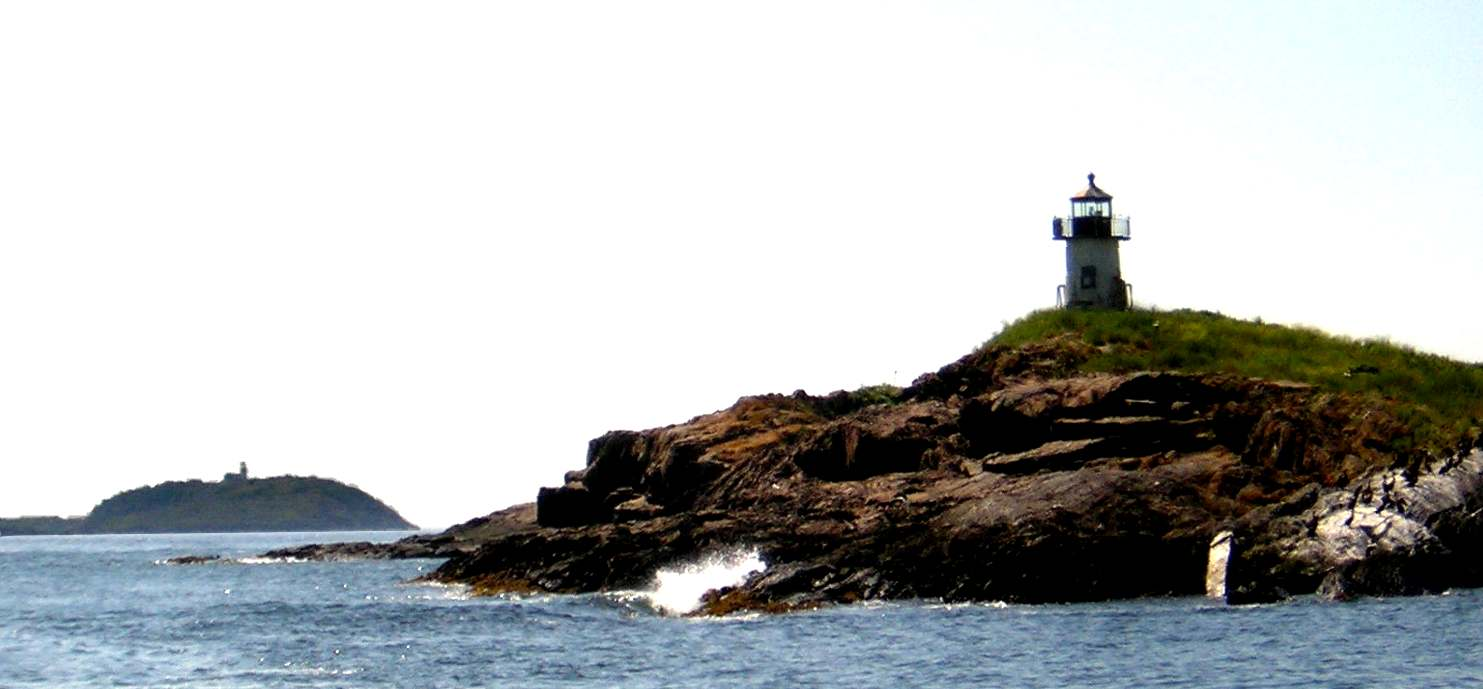
Pond Island and Light with Seguin Light in the background

Pond Island Light is a lighthouse at the mouth of the Kennebec River, Maine. It was first established in 1821 on Pond Island (one of several in Maine) at the mouth of the Kennebec. The present structure was built in 1855.
