= Burnt Coat Harbor Light =

Lighthouse in Maine, US

- Location: Blue Hill Bay, Maine
- Coordinates: 44°08′03.2″N 68°26′50.2″W

Tower
- Constructed: 1872
- Automated: 1975
- Height: 10 m (33 ft)
- Shape: Square Brick Tower
- Markings: White
- Heritage: National Register of Historic Places listed place
- Fog signal: none

Light
- Focal height: 75 feet (23 m)
- Range: 9 nautical miles (17 km; 10 mi)
- Characteristic: Oc W 4s
- Burnt Coat Harbor Light Station
- U.S. National Register of Historic Places
- U.S. Historic district
- Nearest city: Swans Island, Maine
- Architect: US Army Corps of Engineers
- MPS: Light Stations of Maine MPS
- NRHP reference No.: 87002272
- Added to NRHP: January 21, 1988

The Burnt Coat Harbor Light Station is a lighthouse on Swan's Island, Maine. It is located on Hockamock Head, at the entrance to Burnt Coat Harbor and at the end of Harbor Road. Burnt Coat Harbor Light Station is also sometimes referred to as the Swan’s Island Lighthouse. Hockamock Head is a peninsula extending south from the center of the island, dividing the island's main harbor from Toothacker Bay. The light marks the entrance to Burnt Coat Harbor. It was built in 1872, and is a well-preserved 19th-century light station. It was listed on the National Register of Historic Places in 1988.

== Description and history ==
The light station consists of the main tower and three buildings: a keeper's house, bell house, and oil house, set on 3 acres (1.2 ha) at the southernmost tip of Hockamock Point. The tower is a square brick structure 32 feet (9.8 m) in height, with a ten-sided lantern chamber surrounded by an iron walkway with railing. It is capped by a round ventilator. The keeper's house is an L-shaped wood-frame structure, finished in white clapboards. Just to the south of the tower stands the small clapboard bell house, a roughly square structure (it is slightly tapered), with a gable roof and doorway at one end. The oil house is a small brick structure with a doorway at one gabled end, and a small ventilator on the roof.

The station was authorized in 1871, and the tower and keeper's house were completed the following year. The station originally had a second range light, placed at the site of the bell house, with a covered way connecting the two towers. That tower and the covered way were removed in 1884. The bell house was built in 1911, and the oil house in 1895. The station was automated in 1975. The keeper's house is now maintained by the Town of Swan's Island, with financial assistance from Friends of the Swan's Island Lighthouse. The keeper's house is open in the summer with a historical exhibit and a small art gallery. The tower is also open for climbing several days per week. Further information, including a detailed history, live webcams from the tower, and recommendations on visiting the lighthouse, can be found at www.burncoatharborlight.com.

== See also ==
- National Register of Historic Places listings in Hancock County, Maine
