= Castine Historic District =

Historic district in Maine, United States

- U.S. National Register of Historic Places
- U.S. Historic district
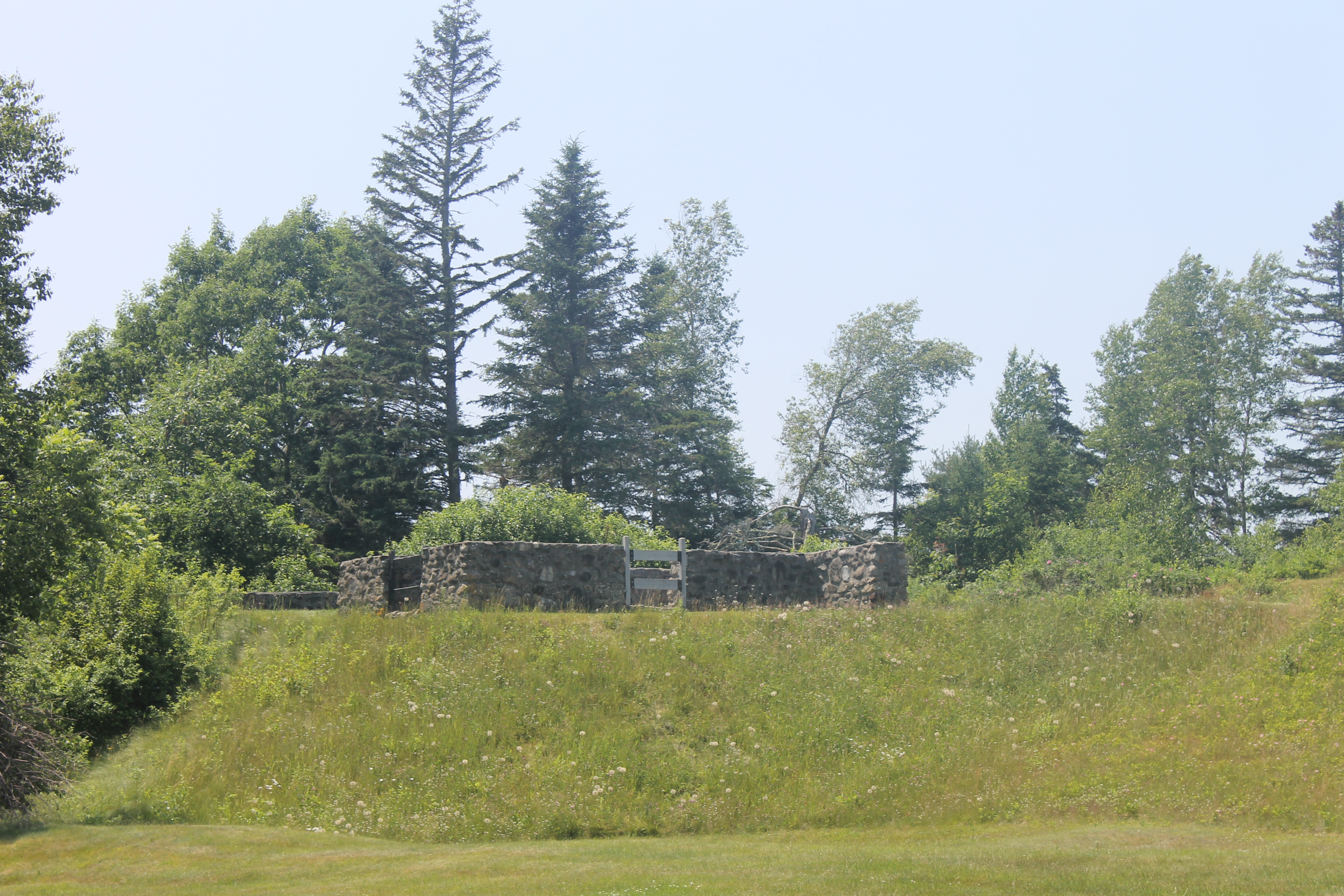
- Ruins of the British-built Fort George (1779)

- Location within Maine Location within the United States
- Location: Roughly bounded by Bagaduce and Penobscot Rivers, and Wadsworth Cove Rd., Castine, Maine
- Area: 1,800 acres (730 ha)
- Architectural style: Greek Revival, Federal
- NRHP reference No.: 73000240
- Added to NRHP: February 23, 1973

The Castine Historic District encompasses the entire southern tip of the peninsula on which the town of Castine, Maine is located. Covering about 1,800 acres (730 ha), this area was a center of colonial conflicts dating to the early 17th century, and was the site of military action during the American Revolutionary War and the War of 1812. Bypassed by the railroads, it has retained a village feel reminiscent of the early 19th century. It was listed on the National Register of Historic Places in 1973.

== History ==
Castine is located at the mouth of the Bagaduce River, where it empties into Penobscot Bay, in the center of coastal Maine. This area, first known as "Pentagoet" and "Majabigwaduce", was the site of a French trading post established in the early 17th century. Its presence was disputed by English colonists, and it was seized by the Plymouth Colony around 1630. It changed hands a number of times in the 17th century, falling firmly under French control by the 1670s under the leadership of Jean-Vincent d'Abbadie de Saint-Castin, for whom the town is named. After the English capture of Castin's son in 1725, the French abandoned the settlement, and it was resettled by British colonists from the Province of Massachusetts Bay in 1760.

In the American Revolutionary War Castine became the scene of further conflict. The peninsula was seized and fortified by British forces in 1779, and Massachusetts raised a military force in response to dispute the occupation. This led to the disastrous Penobscot Expedition, which resulted in the destruction of the entire Massachusetts fleet, including the scuttling of ships in the Castine area. British forces again occupied Castine in 1814, during the War of 1812.

After the War of 1812, Castine's maritime economy flourished, resulting in the construction of a number of fine Federal style buildings in the town. Due to its remote location with respect to land transportation, the town declined when railroads became a dominant form of transportation, and the sailing ship was replaced by steamers. Its economy was bolstered by the presence of a normal school, whose campus was taken over in 1942 by the Maine Maritime Academy.

Architecturally, the community is dominated by Georgian, Federal, and Greek Revival buildings, built before 1860. There are a small number of later Victorian summer houses. The remnants of British and American fortifications are also a significant presence in the community, as is the 1829 Dice Head Light at the southwestern tip of the peninsula.

== See also ==
- National Register of Historic Places listings in Hancock County, Maine
