= Two Bush Island Light =

Lighthouse in Maine, US

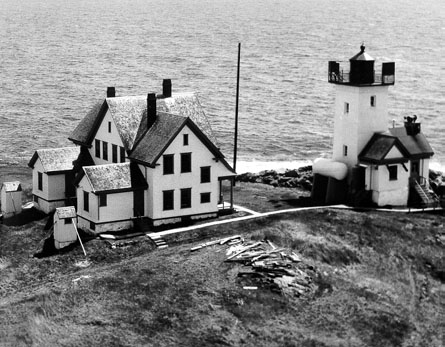
- Location: Penobscot Bay entrance, Maine
- Coordinates: 43°57′51.26″N 69°4′26.06″W

Tower
- Constructed: 1897
- Automated: 1964
- Height: 42 feet (13 m)
- Shape: Square Brick Tower
- Markings: White
- Power source: solar cell
- Fog signal: HORN: 1 every 15s

Light
- Focal height: 65 feet (20 m)
- Lens: VRB-25
- Range: 21 nautical miles (39 km; 24 mi) & 15 nautical miles (28 km; 17 mi)
- Characteristic: Fl W 5s with R sector

Two Bush Island Light is a lighthouse on Two Bush Island, on the channel of the same name, the southwestern entrance to Penobscot Bay, Maine, United States. The two bushes for which the island was named have long since vanished. The lighthouse was established in 1897. The keepers were removed when the light was automated in 1964. Afterward, the Two Bush Island fog signal was operated by the keepers at nearby Whitehead Light Station, who also monitored the light. The keeper's house was destroyed in 1970 as a Green Beret demolition exercise. In the summer of 2000, the light was converted to solar power. The lighthouse itself continues to be a navigation aid, but is only visible by boat or from the air. In 1998, the lighthouse became the property of the U.S. Fish and Wildlife Service.
