= Nash Island Light =

Lighthouse in Maine, US

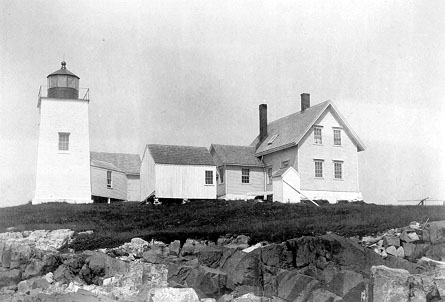
- US Coast Guard photo
- Location: Pleasant Bay, Maine
- Coordinates: 44°27′51.1″N 67°44′50.1″W

Tower
- Constructed: 1838
- Automated: 1947
- Height: 9 m (30 ft)

Light
- First lit: 1873
- Deactivated: 1982
- Lens: 4th order Fresnel lens

Nash Island Light is a lighthouse on Nash Island at the entrance to Pleasant Bay in Maine.

== History ==
It was first established in 1838. The present structure was built in 1874. It was replaced by a buoy in 1982. The USCG historical site says that it included a one-room schoolhouse, despite its isolated location on a small island.

=== Keepers ===
- John Wass (1847–1853)
- Daniel Curtis (1853-unknown)
- Enos D. Wass (1865–1872)
- Edwin K. Heath (1872–1876)
- Nehemiah Guptill (1876–1881)
- Roscoe G. Lophaus (1881–1883)
- Charles S. Holt (1883–1902)
- Osmond Cummings
- Allen Carter Holt (1910–1916)
- John Purington (1916–1935)
- Edwin Pettegrow (c. 1930s)
- Larson Alley (unknown-1947)
- Edward Wallace (1947–1958)
