= Eagle Island Light =

Lighthouse in Maine, United States

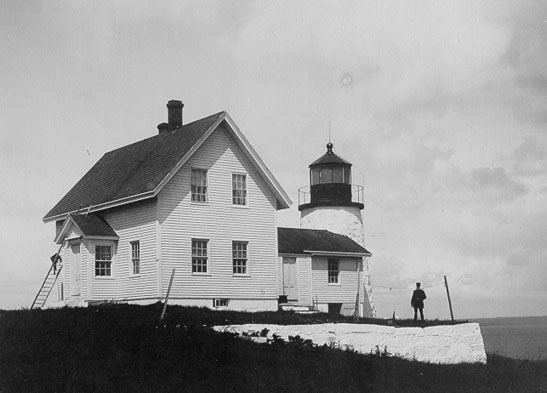
- Location: Eagle Island, Maine
- Coordinates: 44°13′3.53″N 68°46′3.98″W

Tower
- Constructed: 1838
- Foundation: Natural / emplaced
- Construction: Granite rubblestone
- Automated: 1963
- Height: 30 feet (9.1 m)
- Shape: Conical Tower
- Markings: White with black lantern
- Fog signal: none

Light
- First lit: 1858
- Focal height: 106 feet (32 m)
- Lens: 4th order Fresnel lens
- Range: 9 nautical miles (17 km; 10 mi)
- Characteristic: Fl W 4s

Eagle Island Light is a lighthouse on Eagle Island in Penobscot Bay, in south central Maine. The tower was first lit in 1838 but had to be torn down because of major physical defects. It was rebuilt in 1858 and operated by several families over the next century. In 1959 the light was automated, and five years later, over vehement local protests, the keeper's house was torn down and the bell was removed. The crew that removed the bell lost control of it, and it fell into the Bay. A Lobsterman salvaged it some years later and it is on exhibit on Great Spruce Head Island.

Today Eagle Light is owned by a nonprofit which provides public access and has restored both the light itself and the square pyramidal bell tower. Along with several other lights in Maine, the growth of trees around the light has made its future problematic.
