= Tenants Harbor Light =

Lighthouse in Maine, US

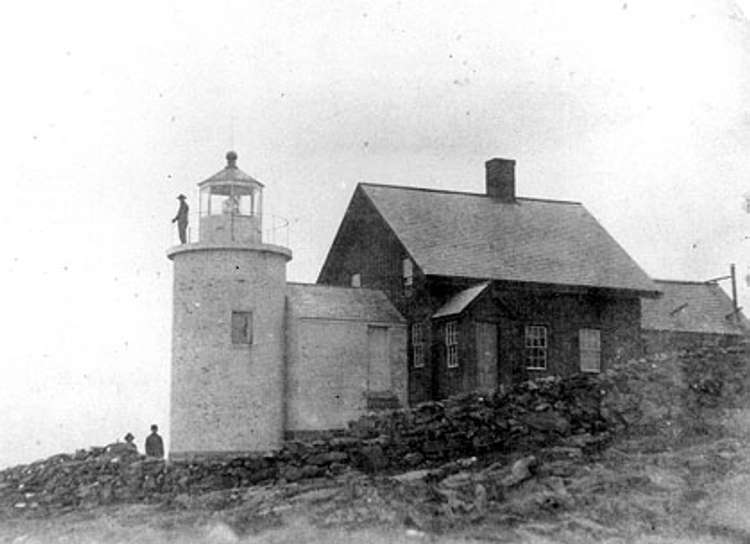
- Location: Southern Island, Tenants Harbor, Maine, United States
- Coordinates: 43°57′40″N 69°11′5.4″W

Tower
- Constructed: 1857
- Foundation: Stone
- Construction: Brick
- Height: 27 feet (8.2 m)
- Shape: Cylindrical tower, with attached dwelling
- Markings: White with black lantern
- Heritage: National Register of Historic Places listed place
- Fog signal: Bell in square pyramidal tower Current tower is a replica

Light
- Deactivated: 1933
- Focal height: 66 feet (20 m)
- Lens: 4th order Fresnel lens, then 5th order
- Range: 13 nautical miles (24 km; 15 mi)
- Tenants Harbor Light Station
- U.S. National Register of Historic Places
- U.S. Historic district
- Nearest city: Tenants Harbor, Maine
- Area: 20 acres (8.1 ha)
- Architect: US Army Corps of Engineers
- Architectural style: Cape Cod style keeper's residence
- MPS: Light Stations of Maine MPS
- NRHP reference No.: 87002026
- Added to NRHP: November 20, 1987

Tenants Harbor Light, also known as Southern Island Light, is a lighthouse at the mouth of Tenants Harbor, St. George, Maine, United States. It appears in paintings by Andrew Wyeth and his son Jamie Wyeth, who have owned the lighthouse since 1978.

== History ==
It was established in 1857 on Southern Island, on the south side of the entrance to the harbor. It is on the west side of Two Bush Channel, the southwestern entrance to Penobscot Bay.

The light was 66 feet (20 m) above the high-water mark. By the 1900s a fifth-order Fresnel lens replaced the original fourth-order (larger) lens.

The 1½-story, wood-framed, colonial cape lighthouse keeper's residence was constructed in 1857. A brick-covered passageway connects the tower and the keeper's quarters. Other buildings include a storage building (1895), an oil house (1906), a boathouse, and a hand-operated fog bell in a square pyramidal tower (automated subsequently).

The light was discontinued in 1933 and auctioned off as surplus in 1936.

== Current status ==
The lighthouse was purchased in 1978 by Andrew Wyeth. His son Jamie now owns it. He reconstructed the white square pyramid bell house, and it is said to be a scaled-down replica of one of Lord Horatio Nelson's cabins on HMS Victory. The lighthouse has appeared in several Wyeth paintings, including Fog Bell (1967) and Signal Flags by Andrew Wyeth. Other lighthouse images by James Wyeth are: Iris at Sea (painted as a fund raising project to benefit the Island Institute of Rockland); Lighthouse Dandelions; The Gaggle (1995) Southern Island Sunset (1995), and Lighthouse. The light and the island are the subjects of paintings by the Wyeths, including some, from the personal collection of Andrew Wyeth and Betsy Jane Wyeth, which are at the Farnsworth Art Museum in a special Wyeth collection, and part of the museum's periodically rotating shows. Jamie Wyeth has found the environs of Southern Island to be an inspiration for his art.

One of eight privately owned lights in Maine, it has no formal support group, though Maine is the location of the American Lighthouse Foundation and Lighthouse Digest magazine.

Andrew Wyeth and the Tenants Harbor Light were the subject of an encomium published by the Island Institute: Island Journal Turns 25 (2009), It is said to include an 'extraordinary folio" of Andrew Wyeth's island work, as he was "a man who loved islands", particularly those in Maine.

Tenants Harbor Light was listed on the National Register of Historic Places as "Tenants Harbor Light Station" on November 20, 1987, reference number 87002026.

== Getting there ==
- The best view of this light is from the water. Local lighthouse tours and other longer distance cruises (from Camden or from Tenants Harbor) can also provide views of this lighthouse.
- However, a long distance glimpse may be had from the shore at the public boat landing near Tenants Harbor. Tenants Harbor lies south of US Route 1 east of Thomaston, Maine. Turn south on State Route 131 and proceed about ten miles (16 km). Follow Hartsneck Road to the end.
