= Eagle Island (Penobscot Bay, Maine) =

Island in Hancock County, Maine, United States

Coordinates: 44°12′45″N 68°46′30″W

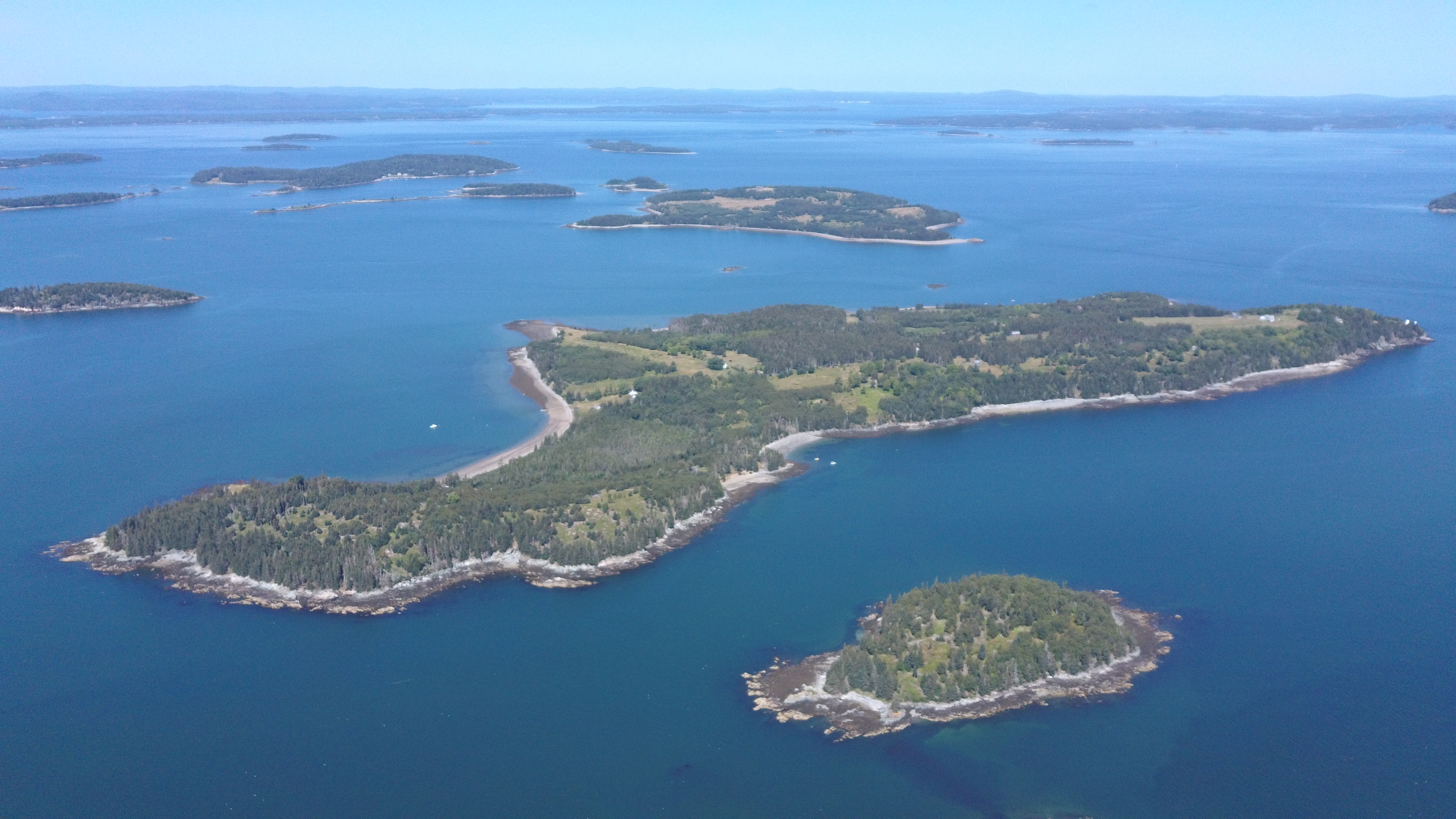
Aerial Photo of Eagle Island taken on 25th of August 2019

Eagle Island is a 263-acre island in Penobscot Bay, Maine, United States, between North Haven and Deer Isle, in Hancock County. It is not part of the nearby Town of Deer Isle but is an unincorporated territory of the state. The island was conveyed to Samuel Quinn by John C. Gray on November 18, 1844, with the exception of a small lot containing Eagle Island Light, which Gray had previously deeded to the government. Quinn also bought from Gray one-half of Fling Island and "all Farming Tools, hay and neat stock and sheep belonging to said John C. Gray on said Eagle Island" for $1500. His descendants still own a majority of Eagle Island and continue to live there.

== Education ==
The Maine Department of Education assigns students in Eagle Island to schools.
