= Saint Croix River Light =

Lighthouse in Maine, US

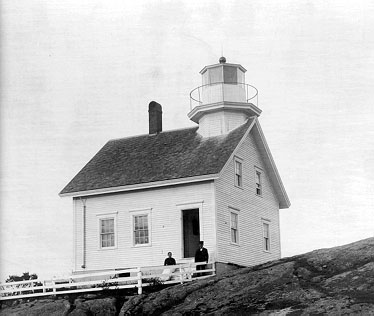
- The structure built in 1857
- Location: St. Croix River, Maine
- Coordinates: 45°7′41.67″N 67°8′1.75″W

Tower
- Constructed: 1857
- Automated: 1957
- Height: 23 m (75 ft)
- Shape: Skeleton tower surmounted by platform
- Markings: White
- Fog signal: none

Light
- First lit: 1976 (current structure)
- Focal height: 101 feet (31 m)
- Range: 7 nautical miles (13 km; 8.1 mi)
- Characteristic: Fl W 2.5s

St. Croix River Light is a lighthouse on the St. Croix River, Maine, close to the Canada–United States border. It was first established in 1857. An octagonal wood tower on top of a keeper's house was built in 1901 and was destroyed by fire in 1976. The present skeleton tower was built following the fire.
