= Great Duck Island, Maine =

Island in Hancock County, Maine, United States

Coordinates: 44°09′08″N 68°14′55″W

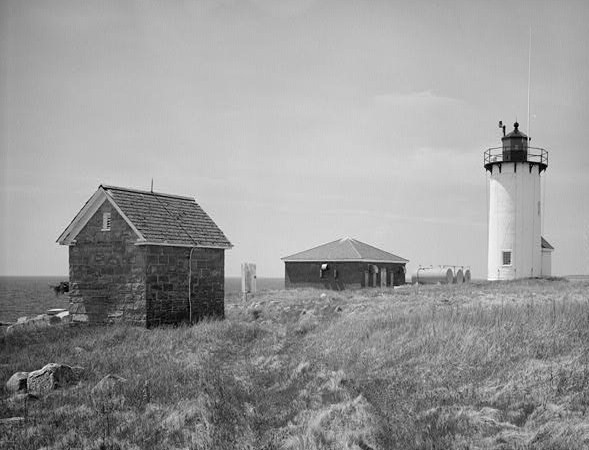
Great Duck Island Light Station

Great Duck Island is a small island (1.5 miles (2.4 km) long by 0.5 miles (0.8 km) wide) in the Gulf of Maine, 11 miles (18 km) south of the entrance to Frenchman Bay, not far from Acadia National Park. Along with nearby Little Duck Island and 11 others, it is part of the town of Frenchboro.

According to The Nature Conservancy, the island provides habitat for the largest nesting black guillemot colony in Maine. Great Duck is an active site for ecological research, conducted by the College of the Atlantic at its Alice Eno field Research Station. Much of this research focuses on the nesting habits of Leach's storm-petrel.

== History ==
The island was inhabited year-round from sometime after 1837 when William Gilley purchased the island, until 1986 when the Coast Guard left and the lighthouse was automated. For much of this period it was used to pasture sheep, support the light station, and provide a summer retreat for mainland property owners.

Great Duck Island Light was established in 1890, and the original lighthouse, head keeper's house, fog signal building, storage building, and boathouse from this year still stand.

Bill and Ellen Bigenho purchased most of the island beginning in 1949. According to their daughter Ellen Spain, they used a 16th or 17th century map to dig up a pirate treasure of gold and silver in 1953.

In 1963 Boston psychotherapist George Cloutier bought most of the island from the Bigenhos. In the 1970s Cloutier constructed an airstrip, and ran a psychiatric clinic and intentional community on the island including a geodesic dome and yurts, described as an "experiment in gestalt psychiatry that must be unique in island annals." The clinic closed in 1979.

In 1985 The Nature Conservancy and the State of Maine purchased most of the island in joint tenancy. In 1998 the College of the Atlantic acquired the 12-acre (4.9 ha) light station under the Maine Lights Program, renaming it the Alice Eno Biological Station in 2000.
