= College of the Atlantic =

Liberal arts college in Bar Harbor, Maine

Coordinates: 44°23′47.17″N 68°13′25.27″W

- Type: Private liberal arts college
- Established: 1969; 57 years ago
- Accreditation: NECHE
- Affiliations: Eco League; Council of Independent Colleges; Annapolis Group
- Endowment: $100.1 million
- President: Lynn Boulger (interim)
- Undergraduates: 377
- Postgraduates: 3
- Location: Bar Harbor, Maine, United States
- Campus: Rural
- Colors: Blue and Green
- Website: www.coa.edu

College of the Atlantic (COA) is a private liberal arts college in Bar Harbor on Mount Desert Island, Maine. Founded in 1969, it awards two degrees, a Bachelor of Arts and a Master of Philosophy (MPhil) degree solely in the field of human ecology, using an interdisciplinary approach to learning. Focus areas include arts and design, environmental sciences, humanities, international studies, sustainable food systems, teacher certification and educational studies, and socially responsible business. The College of the Atlantic is accredited by the New England Commission of Higher Education.

The campus consists of 37 acres (15 ha) on Frenchman Bay, two organic farms, two off-shore island research stations, and a 100-acre (40 ha) protected area. The farms, Beech Hill Farm and Peggy Rockefeller Farms, are living laboratories for classes and student research. Peggy Rockefeller Farms includes livestock, crops, orchards. Beech Hill Farm provides produce. Both supply the dining hall with organic produce, eggs, and meat. The off-shore island properties include the Alice Eno Field Research Station on Great Duck Island where students conduct studies on Leach's storm petrels, guillemots, gulls, sparrows and other fields of natural history. The Edward McCormick Blair Research station on Mount Desert Rock is a center for the study of marine mammals and oceanographic issues.

== History ==
The College of the Atlantic was conceived by Mount Desert Island residents who wanted to stimulate the island's economy during the off-season, when revenue from tourism declined, by forming a year-round, four-year institution of higher education.

In 1968, James Gower, a Catholic priest and peace activist, and his former football teammate from Bar Harbor High School, businessman Les Brewer, conceived the idea for the College of the Atlantic. Brewer and Gower founded the school in 1969, when the school of human ecology was granted temporary approval on June 23, 1969, by the Maine State Board of Education. Three other Mount Desert residents helped establish the college: Bernard K. "Sonny" Cough, Richard Lewis and Robert Smith. Edward Kaelber, then assistant dean at Harvard Graduate School of Education, became the first president and was joined in 1970 by Melville P. Cote as assistant to the President and Director of Admissions and Student Affairs.

Gower proposed "Acadia Peace College" as the original name for the school, though this was rejected in favor of the College of the Atlantic. The College of the Atlantic began offering its first classes in 1972 with an enrollment of just 32 students. The institution had about 300 students for the 2012–13 school year. The College of the Atlantic offers only one academic major: human ecology. Gower helped create the curriculum for the college and its academic programs.

The majority of the campus was purchased for $1 from the Oblate Fathers of Mary Immaculate Seminary, who used the site as a monastery. Parts of the campus were also donated by the family of co-founder Bernard Cough.

== Academics ==
The school's curriculum is based on human ecology and all first-year students are required to take an introductory course in human ecology. Other requirements include two courses in each focus area (Environmental Studies, Arts and Design, Human Studies), one quantitative reasoning course, one history course, and one course that involves extensive writing. The intention is for students to explore and integrate ideas from different disciplines and to construct their own understanding of human ecology. With its focus on interdisciplinary learning, College of the Atlantic does not have distinct departments, and all faculty members consider themselves human ecologists in addition to their formal specialization.

== Students ==
With international students comprising an average of 17 percent of the student body, College of the Atlantic is among the five liberal arts colleges with the highest proportion of international students. These students primarily graduate from United World Colleges and are awarded significant scholarships through the Davis United World College Scholars Program.

== Sustainability ==
In 2004, COA was the first college in Maine to make a multi-year commitment to be powered entirely by renewable energy, signing a 10-year contract with Endless Energy Corporation. In 2005 it was the first school to hold a zero-waste graduation. In October 2006, COA pledged to become carbon neutral, offsetting all of its carbon emissions, including those created by visiting students; COA fulfilled the pledge in December 2007 by purchasing carbon offsets for their emissions through the Climate Trust of Oregon. The college currently offsets those emissions it cannot reduce or avoid via truck stop electrification through Carbonfund.org. In 2016, COA was ranked as the #1 green college by The Princeton Review.

== Notable alumni ==
- Anjali Appadurai, Canadian politician
- Abigail Barrows, marine research scientist
- Jacquelyn Gill, paleoecologist
- Amy Goodman, journalist
- Nell Newman, actress
- Chellie Pingree, U.S. Representative from Maine

== See also ==
- List of colleges and universities in Maine
