= Avery Rock Light =

Lighthouse in Maine, US

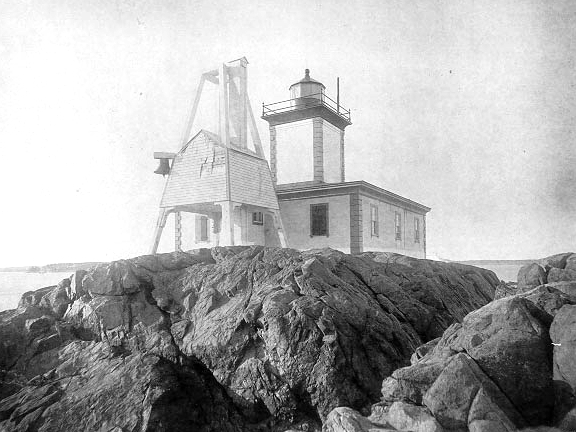
- Location: Avery Rock, Machias Bay, Maine
- Coordinates: 44°39′16″N 67°20′39″W

Tower
- Constructed: 1875
- Construction: Brick and wood
- Automated: 1926
- Height: 34 feet (10 m)
- Shape: Square tower
- Fog signal: Bell every 10 seconds

Light
- First lit: 1875
- Deactivated: 1947
- Lens: Fifth order
- Range: 13 nm
- Characteristic: Fixed red

Avery Rock Light was a lighthouse in Avery Rock, Machias Bay, Maine, United States. It was built on a rocky islet, 110 metres long and 48 metres wide, in the middle of Machias Bay accessible only by boat. The old light was a square tower built in 1875 with a gallery and lantern centered on the keeper's house. The lighthouse was automated in 1926, but it later suffered storm damage in 1947 that was beyond repair which led to its demolition.

The lighthouse was later rebuilt as a 13 feet (4.0 m) skeletal tower with a focal plane at 17 feet (5.2 m) which emits a white flash every 6 seconds.
