= Heron Neck Light =

Lighthouse in Maine, United States

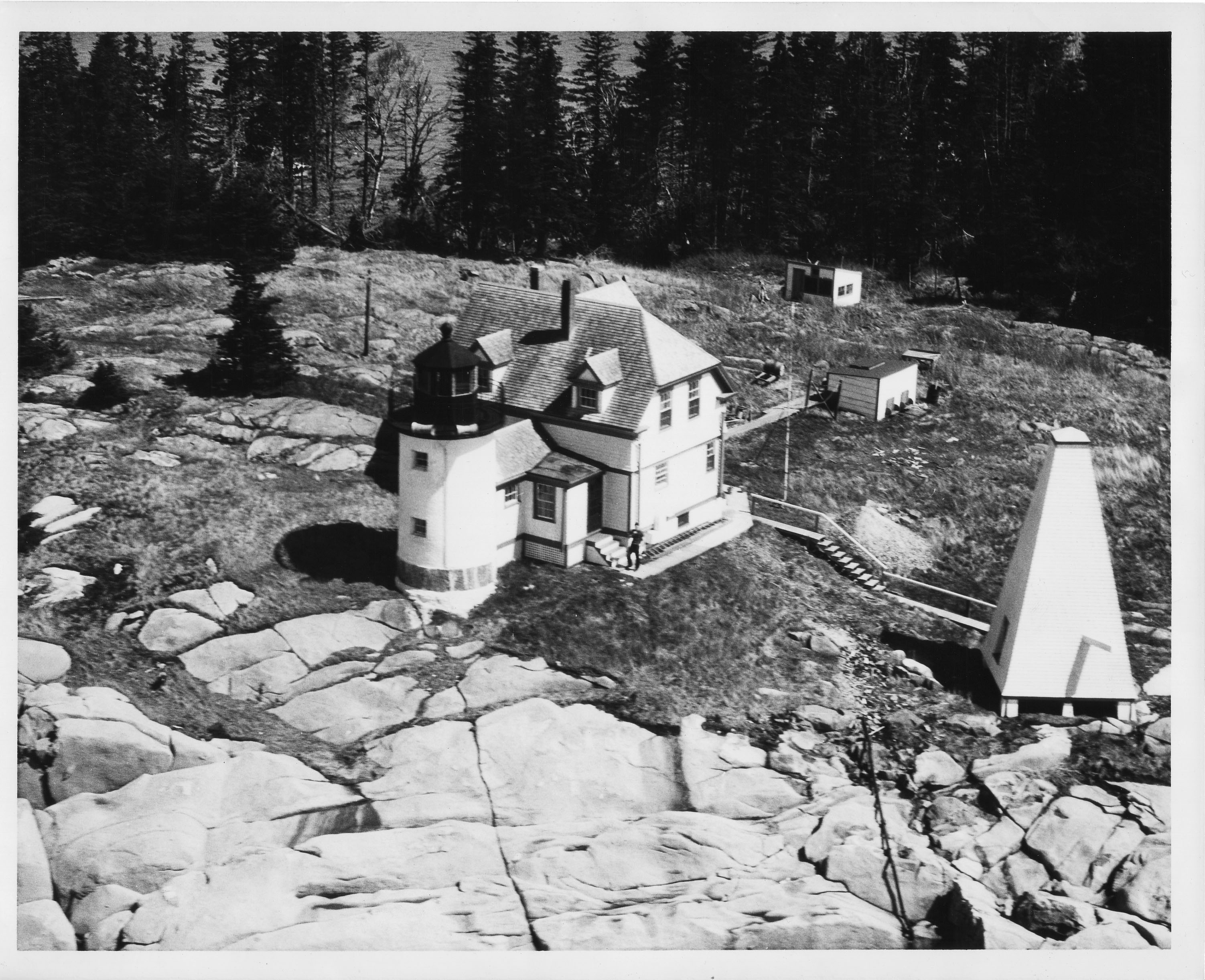
- US Coast Guard photo ca 1954
- Location: Penobscot Bay
- Coordinates: 44°1′30.4″N 68°51′43.8″W

Tower
- Constructed: 1854
- Automated: 1982
- Height: 9 m (30 ft)
- Shape: Conical Tower attached to Dwelling
- Markings: White
- Heritage: National Register of Historic Places listed place
- Fog signal: HORN 1 every 30s

Light
- First lit: 1854
- Focal height: 92 feet (28 m)
- Range: 9 nautical miles (17 km; 10 mi) & 7 nautical miles (13 km; 8.1 mi)
- Characteristic: F R with W sector
- Heron Neck Light Station
- U.S. National Register of Historic Places
- U.S. Historic district
- Nearest city: Vinalhaven, Maine
- Architect: US Army Corps of Engineers
- MPS: Light Stations of Maine MPS
- NRHP reference No.: 87002266
- Added to NRHP: January 21, 1988

Heron Neck Light is a lighthouse on Green's Island in Vinalhaven, Maine at the south end of Penobscot Bay. It was established in 1854 as an aid to navigation for Vinalhaven's main port, and for the Hurricane Channel extending northwest from Heron's Neck. The light was automated in 1984. It was listed on the National Register of Historic Places as Heron Neck Light Station on January 21, 1988.

== Description and history ==
The town of Vinalhaven is primarily located on an eponymous island in the Fox Island group at the southern center of Penobscot Bay. The island is surrounded by smaller islands and ledges, and its town center and main port are located in Carver's Harbor, on Vinalhaven Island's south side. Southwest of Carver's Harbor lies Green's Island, one of the largest satellite islands. Heron Neck Light stands at the southernmost tip of Green's Island, on a projecting peninsula called Heron Neck. To the west of Green's Island is a channel separating it from a series of islets and ledges, the largest of which is Hurricane Island.

The light station consists of the lighthouse, a connected keeper's house, an oil house, and a fog signal. These are all set on the exposed southern face of Heron Neck, with a boat landing on the more sheltered northern side of the peninsula. The tower is a circular brick structure, with a polygonal lantern house mounted on top, with an iron parapet and railing surrounding it. A covered passage joins the tower to the keeper's house, a 1 1/2-story L-shaped wood-frame building. The oil house is a small stone structure with a gabled roof; it is a departure from most of Maine's oil houses, which are built out of brick. North of this complex stands the fog signal, a mid-20th century square hip-roofed building.

The station was authorized in 1853 and went into service in 1854. The tower is original; the keeper's house was built in 1895–96 to replace the original brick house. At this time Vinalhaven was a fishing and agricultural community, but it saw significant growth in the late 19th century as a resort community and because of its granite quarries. Originally fitted with a fifth-order Fresnel lens, the light was automated in 1984.

== See also ==
- National Register of Historic Places listings in Knox County, Maine
