= Deer Isle Thorofare Light =

Lighthouse in Maine, US

Deer Island Thorofare Light
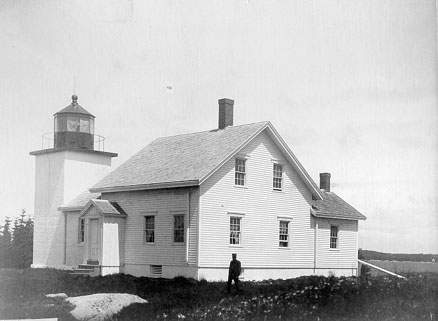
- Location: Penobscot Bay, Maine
- Coordinates: 44°8′3.72″N 68°42′11.79″W

Tower
- Constructed: 1857
- Foundation: Masonry
- Construction: Brick
- Automated: 1958
- Height: 7.5 m (25 ft)
- Shape: Square tower
- Markings: White with black lantern and trim
- Fog signal: Original: Bell; Current: Horn: 1 every 15s, operates continuously

Light
- Focal height: 52 feet (16 m)
- Lens: 4th order Fresnel Lens (original), 9.8 inches (250 mm) (current)
- Range: 8 nautical miles (15 km; 9.2 mi)
- Characteristic: Fl W 6s

Deer Isle Thorofare Light, also known as Mark Island Light, is a lighthouse on Penobscot Bay, Maine, about 1.8 nautical miles (3.3 km; 2.1 mi) west-southwest of Stonington. It was built in 1857.

== History ==
The station was established in 1857 with the building of the current small square brick tower and a keeper's house. It was built at the time that the granite quarries on Deer Isle and Crotch Island, immediately to the east, were becoming important for the construction of public buildings throughout the eastern United States. It was automated in 1958. The keeper's house burned down in 1959 and the rest of the buildings were removed shortly thereafter. In 1998 control of the site was passed to the Island Heritage Trust, a local group which preserves historic sites in the area. They have promised to keep the island as a bird sanctuary.

== Location and Nomenclature ==
It sits on a small island at the west end of the Deer Island Thorofare and of Merchant Row, two east-west passages among the small islands which lie between Deer Isle and Isle au Haut. The island is called "Mark Island" on NOAA charts 13302 and 13313, but "Marks Island" on the larger scale chart 13315. The light is called "Mark Island Light" on an early 20th-century postcard and is still locally referred to by that name. Also confusing is that the large island to the north and the town on it are "Deer Isle", but the passage is "Deer Island Thorofare".
