= Mistake Island =

Island in Maine, United States

Coordinates: 44°28′30″N 67°32′10″W

- View of Mistake Island from the sea,
- Interactive map of Mistake Island

Geography
- Location: Atlantic Ocean
- Area: 27 acres (11 ha)
- Highest elevation: 14 ft (4.3 m)

Mistake Island is an island in Washington County, in the U.S. state of Maine. It has been noted for its unusual place name. Mistake Island is the location of the Moose Peak Lighthouse. It is an exceptionally foggy area. Portions of the 2016 film To Keep the Light were filmed on the island.

== Description ==
Mistake Island has an area of 27 acres and an elevation of 14 feet. It is just east of Great Wass Island at the southern entrance to Eastern Bay and five nautical miles southeast of Jonesport. It contains little vegetation, though in 1907 Joseph Augustine Cushman found specimens of Primula farinosa macropoda on the island.

The island is foggy about 20% of the time, making it one of the foggiest areas in Maine. Between 1918 and 1934 it averaged 1,067 hours per year in the fog. During 1966, the fog signal needed to be on for a total of 2,485.3 hours.

== Moose Peak Light ==
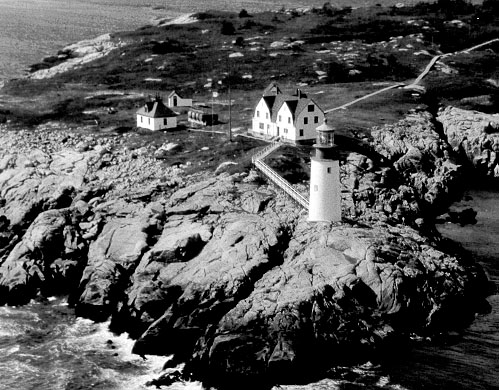
Moose Peak Lighthouse on Mistake Island

Moose Peak Light is a lighthouse on the east end of Mistake Island. The lighthouse is usually closed to visitors, but is opened for the annual Maine Open Lighthouse Day in September.

The lighthouse is constructed mainly of brick with a stone foundation.

During the 1800s, it was also referred to as the Moose-a-bec Light-house.

=== History ===
Moose Peak Light was first built in 1826. The initial structure was 24 feet tall and constructed of rubblestone. It was rebuilt from brick in 1851, with second-order Fresnel lens being added in 1856. A new watchroom and staircase were added in 1886. The light was fully automated in 1972.

Moose Peak Light was sold at auction in January 2013 to a private owner from Connecticut.

== To Keep the Light ==
Indie filmmaker Erica Fae filmed several parts of her 2016 period drama To Keep the Light on Mistake Island. The film follows Annie, the wife of an ailing lighthouse keeper, with Moose Peak Light serving as the lighthouse. In writing To Keep the Light, Fae states she was inspired by the stories of female lighthouse keepers like Abbie Burgess and Ida Lewis.

Fae served as the director, writer, lead actress, and co-producer with Jane Applegate for the film. The other cast included David Patrick Kelly as Brackett and Antti Reini as Johan. Music for the film was composed by Caroline Shaw.

=== Reception and awards ===
Fae received several awards for To Keep the Light, including the Emerging Director Award at St. Louis International Film Festival, the Best Director award at the Berlin Indepedent Film Festival, and the Fipresci Prize. Wes Cardino, the director of photography, won the award for Best Cinematography in a feature narritive at the 2016 Woods Hole Film Festival.
