= Seguin Light =

Lighthouse in Maine, United States

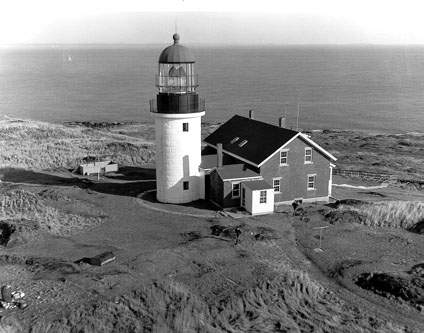
- US Coast Guard photo
- Location: Mouth of the Kennebec River, Maine
- Coordinates: 43°42′26.9″N 69°45′28.9″W

Tower
- Constructed: 1795
- Construction: stone
- Automated: 1985
- Height: 16 m (52 ft)
- Shape: Cylindrical Tower
- Markings: White
- Heritage: National Register of Historic Places listed place
- Fog signal: HORN: 2 every 20s

Light
- First lit: 1857 (current structure)
- Deactivated: 2019
- Focal height: 180 feet (55 m)
- Lens: 1st order Fresnel Lens
- Range: 18 nautical miles (33 km; 21 mi)
- Characteristic: F W
- Seguin Island Light Station
- U.S. National Register of Historic Places
- Nearest city: Georgetown, Maine
- Area: 64 acres (26 ha)
- Built: 1790
- NRHP reference No.: 77000084
- Added to NRHP: March 08, 1977

Seguin Light is a lighthouse on Seguin Island, in the Gulf of Maine south of the mouth of the Kennebec River, Maine. Established in 1795, it is the second-oldest of Maine's coastal lighthouses, and the only lighthouse in the state housing a first-order Fresnel lens. With its light at 180 feet (55 m) above mean sea-level, the present tower, built in 1857, is its highest of the state's lighthouses. Automated in 1985, the buildings of the light station are now operated as a museum property by a non-profit organization, and are seasonally open to the public via scheduled ferry from Popham Beach in Phippsburg. The light was listed on the National Register of Historic Places as Seguin Island Light Station in 1977.

== Description and history ==
Seguin Island is a 64-acre (26 ha) island located about two nautical miles south of Fort Popham in southernmost Phippsburg. The light station is located at the island's highest point, and includes the lighthouse itself, the keeper's house, fog signal building, a small oilhouse, and a tramway for bringing supplies from the shore to the site. The tower is built of cut granite blocks, and is 53 feet (16 m) tall and 16 feet (4.9 m) in diameter at the base. The keeper's house is built of brick, and is 1 1/2 stories in height with a gabled roof; it now houses a museum and shop. The oilhouse and fog signal building are also brick. The tramway consists of wooden rails mounted on timber piles.

The light station was established in 1795, in response to a petition by Massachusetts authorities (Maine then being part of Massachusetts). The first tower was a wood-frame structure completed in 1797. It was replaced in 1820 by a stone tower, which was replaced by the present tower in 1857. Most of the extant structures on the island also date from the 1857 construction period. It is the highest lighthouse on the Maine coast and has the only first order fresnel lens currently used in the state.

Seguin Light was deactivated by the coast guard in April 2019 due to a power cable problem. The lighthouse is awaiting a generator, and eventually a more permanent fix in the form of solar panels. In the meantime, the coast guard has set up a temporary solar beacon as a navigational aid.

== Keepers ==
The keepers of Seguin Light were:

- John Polereszky (1796–1802)
- Christopher Pushard (assistant, 1796–1802)
- John Hollaway (assistant? c. 1800)
- Moses Haskell (1802–1822)
- Jonathan Delano (1822–1825)
- Spencer Delano (assistant? c. 1820)
- John Salters (1825–1839)
- Nathaniel Springer Todd (1839–1849)
- James Marston (1849–1853)
- A. E. Osgood (1853–1857)
- Boyd L. Miles (assistant, 1855)
- Joseph King (assistant, 1855)
- Stephen Marston Jr. (1857)
- Daniel Dodge (1857)
- John C. Lowell (1857–1859)
- Granville Lowell (1859–1861)
- Tallman B. Lowell (assistant, 1859–1860)
- William M. Knight (1860–1861)
- Zina H. Spinney (1861–1866)
- P. O. Spinney (assistant, 1861–1865)
- David Spinney 2nd (assistant, 1861–1863)
- David Spinney (assistant, 1863–1865)
- Rachel Spinney (assistant, 1865–1866)
- William S. Oliver (assistant, 1865–1866)
- Francis L. Morrill (1866–1868)
- William C. Marr (assistant, 1866)
- Ephraim S. Marr (assistant, 1866 and 1874–1875)
- Henry E. Morrill (1866–1867)
- Charles S. Morrill (assistant, 1866–1867)
- Jane Morrill (assistant, 1867–1869)
- Arthur Hutchins (assistant, 1867–1869)
- Samuel G. Crane (1867–1875)
- O. B. Crane (assistant, 1868–1871)
- J. B. Crane (assistant, 1868–1874)
- Louisa N. Lane (Crane?) (assistant, 1871–1872)
- Turner Jewett (assistant, 1872)
- Elisha B. Crane (assistant, 1874–1875)
- Thomas Day (1875–1886)
- Thomas Bibber (assistant, 1876–1880)
- Willis E. Chase (assistant, 1875)
- Henry Wiley (assistant, 1881–1882)
- Samuel Cavanor (assistant, 1882)
- Fernando Wallace (assistant, 1882–1886)
- Edwin M. Wyman (assistant, 1886–1889)
- Henry Day (1886–1890)
- Henry M. Clark (assistant, 1887)
- William H. Wyman (assistant, 1888–1889)
- Jesse Pierce (assistant, 1889)
- Merritt P. Pinkham (assistant 1889–1890, head keeper 1890–1898)
- Parker O. Healey (assistant, 1890–1893)
- William A. Stetson (assistant 1898)
- Fred Hodgkins (assistant, 1903)
- George A. Lewis (1898–1903 and 1907–1912)
- Herbert L. Spinney (assistant 1893–1898, head keeper 1903–1907)
- Walter S. Adams (assistant, 1907–1908)
- Clifford B. Staples (assistant, 1908–1912)
- Henry M. Cuskley (1912–1915)
- Maurice M. Weaver (1915–1922)
- Arthur Marston (assistant? 1921–1923)
- Napoleon B. Fickett (1922–1926)
- Elson L. Small (1926–1930)
- Frank E. Bracey (assistant 1926–1930, head keeper 1930–1931)
- Millard H. Urquhart (assistant 1928–1931, head keeper 1931–1938)
- Jasper L. Cheney (assistant, 1930–1931)
- Joseph M. Conners (assistant, 1931–1936)
- Donald E. Robbins, assistant (1930–1932)
- Clinton L. Dalzell (assistant, 1932–1933)
- Floyd E. Singer (assistant, 1932–1933)
- Truman L. Lathrop (assistant, 1933–1934)
- Benjamin Stockbridge (assistant, 1934)
- Ernest F. Witty (assistant, 1935)
- George A. McKenney (assistant, 1935–1936)
- Clarence Skolfield (assistant, 1936–1944; Coast Guard head keeper 1944–1946)
- Arthur G. Hill (assistant, 1936–1938)
- Maxwell A. DeShon (assistant, 1938–1941)
- Walter F. Stephens (assistant, 1958–1960)
- Russell Wilson (USCG assistant, 1959–1961)
- Kenneth Dukes (USCG assistant, 1959–1961)
- Ronald D. Howard (USCG Boatswain 1st class, 1960–1961)
- Charles L. Rankie (assistant, 1971–1973)

== See also ==
- National Register of Historic Places listings in Sagadahoc County, Maine
