= Frenchboro, Maine =

Town in Maine, United States

- Town
- Location within Maine Location within the United States
- Coordinates: 44°08′32″N 68°21′30″W
- Country: United States
- State: Maine
- County: Hancock

Area
  - Total: 88.43 sq mi (229.03 km^{2})
  - Land: 4.82 sq mi (12.48 km^{2})
  - Water: 83.61 sq mi (216.55 km^{2})
- Elevation: 0 ft (0 m)

Population (2020)
  - Total: 29
  - Density: 6.0/sq mi (2.3/km^{2})
- Time zone: UTC-5 (Eastern (EST))
  - Summer (DST): UTC-4 (EDT)
- ZIP code: 04635
- Area code: 207
- FIPS code: 23-26595
- GNIS feature ID: 582482
- Website: frenchboro.maine.gov

Frenchboro is a town in Hancock County, Maine, United States, and a village within this town located on Long Island, southeast of Swans Island. The population was 29 at the 2020 census. The town is accessible by state ferry service from Bass Harbor.

== Geography ==
According to the United States Census Bureau, the town has a total area of 88.43 square miles (229.03 km^{2}), of which 4.82 square miles (12.48 km^{2}) is land and 83.61 square miles (216.55 km^{2}) is water.

Twelve islands in the Gulf of Maine comprise the town:

- Black Island
- Crow Island
- Duck Islands (2: Little and Great)
- Drum Island
- Green Islands (2)
- Harbor Island
- Long Island
- Mount Desert Light
- Placentia Island
- Pond Island

== Demographics ==
Historical population
Census	Pop.	Note	%±
1820	19		—
1830	42		121.1%
1840	114		171.4%
1850	152		33.3%
1860	188		23.7%
1870	177		−5.9%
1880	150		−15.3%
1890	132		−12.0%
1900	174		31.8%
1910	197		13.2%
1920	164		−16.8%
1930	145		−11.6%
1940	119		−17.9%
1950	97		−18.5%
1960	57		−41.2%
1970	56		−1.8%
1980	43		−23.2%
1990	44		2.3%
2000	38		−13.6%
2010	61		60.5%
2020	29		−52.5%
U.S. Decennial Census

=== 2010 census ===
As of the census of 2010, there were 61 people, 21 households, and 16 families living in the town. The population density was 12.7 inhabitants per square mile (4.9/km^{2}). There were 76 housing units at an average density of 15.8 per square mile (6.1/km^{2}). The racial makeup of the town was 86.9% White, 3.3% Native American, and 9.8% from two or more races.

There were 21 households, of which 47.6% had children under the age of 18 living with them, 57.1% were married couples living together, 14.3% had a female householder with no husband present, 4.8% had a male householder with no wife present, and 23.8% were non-families. 19.0% of all households were made up of individuals, and 19.1% had someone living alone who was 65 years of age or older. The average household size was 2.90 and the average family size was 3.25.

The median age in the town was 27.2 years. 36.1% of residents were under the age of 18; 6.6% were between the ages of 18 and 24; 29.5% were from 25 to 44; 14.7% were from 45 to 64; and 13.1% were 65 years of age or older. The gender makeup of the town was 62.3% male and 37.7% female.

=== 2000 census ===
As of the census of 2000, there were 38 people, 18 households, and 12 families living in the town. The population density was 7.9 inhabitants per square mile (3.1/km^{2}). There were 59 housing units at an average density of 12.3 per square mile (4.7/km^{2}). The racial makeup of the town was 100.00% White.

There were 18 households, out of which 11.1% had children under the age of 18 living with them, 61.1% were married couples living together, and 33.3% were non-families. 22.2% of all households were made up of individuals, and none had someone living alone who was 65 years of age or older. The average household size was 2.11 and the average family size was 2.50.

In the town, the population was spread out, with 18.4% under the age of 18, 10.5% from 18 to 24, 21.1% from 25 to 44, 39.5% from 45 to 64, and 10.5% who were 65 years of age or older. The median age was 44 years. For every 100 females, there were 153.3 males. For every 100 females age 18 and over, there were 158.3 males.

The median income for a household in the town was $38,125, and the median income for a family was $45,000. Males had a median income of $25,625 versus $0 for females. The per capita income for the town was $21,050. There were no families and 7.1% of the population living below the poverty line, including no under eighteens and none of those over 64.

== Buildings and structures ==
Great Duck Island Light, located on Great Duck Island, is in the town of Frenchboro and is listed on the National Register of Historic Places.

== Education ==
Frenchboro Elementary School supports kindergarten through eighth grade.
