= Blue Hill Bay =

Bay in Hancock County, Maine

Coordinates: 44.25°N 68.45°W

Blue Hill Bay is a bay lying to the west of Mount Desert Island in Hancock County, Maine, United States. Approximately 14 mi (23 km) long, its southern boundaries are set by Swan's Island and Placentia Island at its entrance; the town of Blue Hill lies at the far end. Morgan Bay, Union River Bay, and Western Bay empty into it. Long Island in the north of the bay is the largest uninhabited island in Maine.

Due to its protected waters, Blue Hill Bay is popular with recreational boaters. In addition to crab, lobster, and other fisheries, aquaculture of salmon and mussels is practiced in the bay. The shores of the bay are an important breeding ground for harbor seals.
