= Swan's Island, Maine =

Swans Island, Maine
- Town
- Location within Maine Location within the United States
- Coordinates: 44°07′36″N 68°26′23″W
- Country: United States
- State: Maine
- County: Hancock
- Villages: Swans Island; Atlantic; Minturn

Area
  - Total: 80.81 sq mi (209.30 km^{2})
  - Land: 12.41 sq mi (32.14 km^{2})
  - Water: 68.40 sq mi (177.16 km^{2})
- Elevation: 43 ft (13 m)

Population (2020)
  - Total: 355
  - Density: 28/sq mi (11/km^{2})
- Time zone: UTC-5 (Eastern (EST))
  - Summer (DST): UTC-4 (EDT)
- ZIP code: 04685
- Area code: 207
- FIPS code: 23-75455
- GNIS feature ID: 582757
- Website: https://www.townofswansisland.gov/

Swan's Island is an island town in Hancock County, Maine, United States. It is named after Colonel James Swan, of Fife, Scotland, who purchased the island and some surrounding areas and organized their colonization in the eighteenth century. The population was 355 at the 2020 census. The town is accessible by state ferry service from Bass Harbor.

The island has a summertime population of approximately 1,000. There is a general store on the island, which opened in spring 2007, and at least one inn. There are also a number of small cottage-industry shops. The main industry is lobster fishing, which employs 40 people full-time and many others in part-time work.

Swan's Island is also home to the Sweet Chariot Music Festival, an annual summertime show of folk music and sea chanties.

== History ==
Swan's Island was first charted in 1606 by Samuel de Champlain's expedition, and at the time was used by local Indians as a seasonal hunting ground.

James Swan, a member of the Sons of Liberty and Boston Tea Party participant, purchased the island in 1786. In 1791, David Smith, an American Revolutionary War veteran, became the first settler of European extraction on the island.

The population grew slowly to more than 1,000 by 1900. Fish processing was the dominant industry into the 1930s, when it became no longer profitable in the area. The state-run ferry, which began service in 1960, helped make Swan's Island a popular summer tourism destination. The ferry also is used to carry the mail to the island.

== Geography ==
According to the United States Census Bureau, the town has a total area of 80.81 square miles (209.30 km^{2}), of which 12.41 square miles (32.14 km^{2}) is land and 68.40 square miles (177.16 km^{2}) is water.

There are three villages in the town: The Harbor, Atlantic, and Minturn.

== Demographics ==
Historical population
Census	Pop.	Note	%±
1810	51		—
1840	283		—
1850	423		49.5%
1860	492		16.3%
1870	451		−8.3%
1880	765		69.6%
1890	632		−17.4%
1900	758		19.9%
1910	749		−1.2%
1920	566		−24.4%
1930	576		1.8%
1940	452		−21.5%
1950	468		3.5%
1960	402		−14.1%
1970	323		−19.7%
1980	337		4.3%
1990	348		3.3%
2000	327		−6.0%
2010	332		1.5%
2020	355		6.9%
U.S. Decennial Census

=== 2010 census ===
As of the census of 2010, there were 332 people, 146 households, and 99 families living in the town. The population density was 26.8 inhabitants per square mile (10.3/km^{2}). There were 483 housing units at an average density of 38.9 units per square mile (15.0 units/km^{2}). The racial makeup of the town was 96.1% White, 0.9% African American, 0.9% Native American, and 2.1% from two or more races. Hispanic or Latino of any race were 0.3% of the population.

There were 146 households, of which 26.0% had children under the age of 18 living with them, 56.8% were married couples living together, 6.2% had a female householder with no husband present, 4.8% had a male householder with no wife present, and 32.2% were non-families. 28.8% of all households were made up of individuals, and 14.4% had someone living alone who was 65 years of age or older. The average household size was 2.27 and the average family size was 2.73.

The median age in the town was 46.3 years. 19.3% of residents were under the age of 18; 5% were between the ages of 18 and 24; 24.3% were from 25 to 44; 33.6% were from 45 to 64; and 17.5% were 65 years of age or older. The gender makeup of the town was 52.1% male and 47.9% female.

=== 2000 census ===
As of the census of 2000, there were 327 people, 142 households, and 90 families living in the town. The population density was 23.4 people per square mile (9.0 people/km^{2}). There were 421 housing units at an average density of 30.2 units per square mile (11.7 units/km^{2}). The racial makeup of the town was 98.17% White, 0.31% African American, and 1.53% from two or more races.

There were 142 households, out of which 26.8% had children under the age of 18 living in them; 59.2% were married couples living together; 2.1% had a female householder with no husband present, and 36.6% were non-families. 30.3% of all households were made up of individuals, and 13.4% had someone living alone who was 65 years of age or older. The average household size was 2.30 and the average family size was 2.87.

In the town, the population was spread out, with 23.9% under the age of 18; 8.3% from 18 to 24; 24.5% from 25 to 44; 24.8% from 45 to 64, and 18.7% who were 65 years of age or older. The median age was 41 years. For every 100 females, there were 105.7 males. For every 100 females age 18 and over, there were 112.8 males.

The median income for a household in the town was $28,438, and the median income for a family was $32,083. Males had a median income of $29,028 versus $18,750 for females. The per capita income for the town was $14,515. About 11.3% of families and 16.0% of the population were below the poverty line, including 15.1% of those under age 18 and 21.7% of those age 65 or over.

== Activities ==
A travel agency specializing in trails, describes attractions for the island that include six historic homes dating to the 1700s, a listing on the National Register of Historic Places, a lighthouse, nature features that include nesting bald eagles, waterfowl, as well as deer, and trails, hiking, and camping.

== Education ==
It is in the Maine School Administrative District 76.

== See also ==
- List of islands of Maine
- List of Hiking Trails in Maine
- Oddfellows Hall
