= Wilford =

Village in Nottinghamshire, England

Coordinates: 52.926°N 1.160°W

- Village and suburb
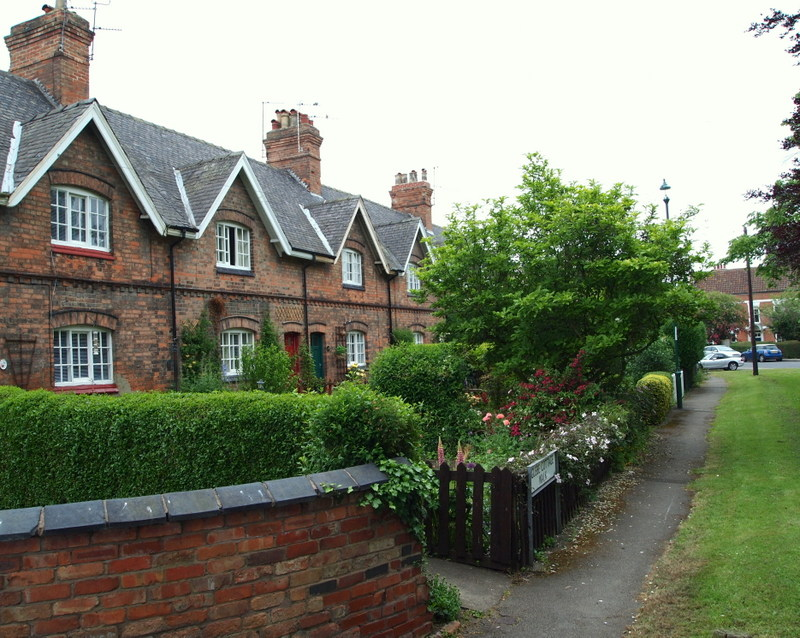
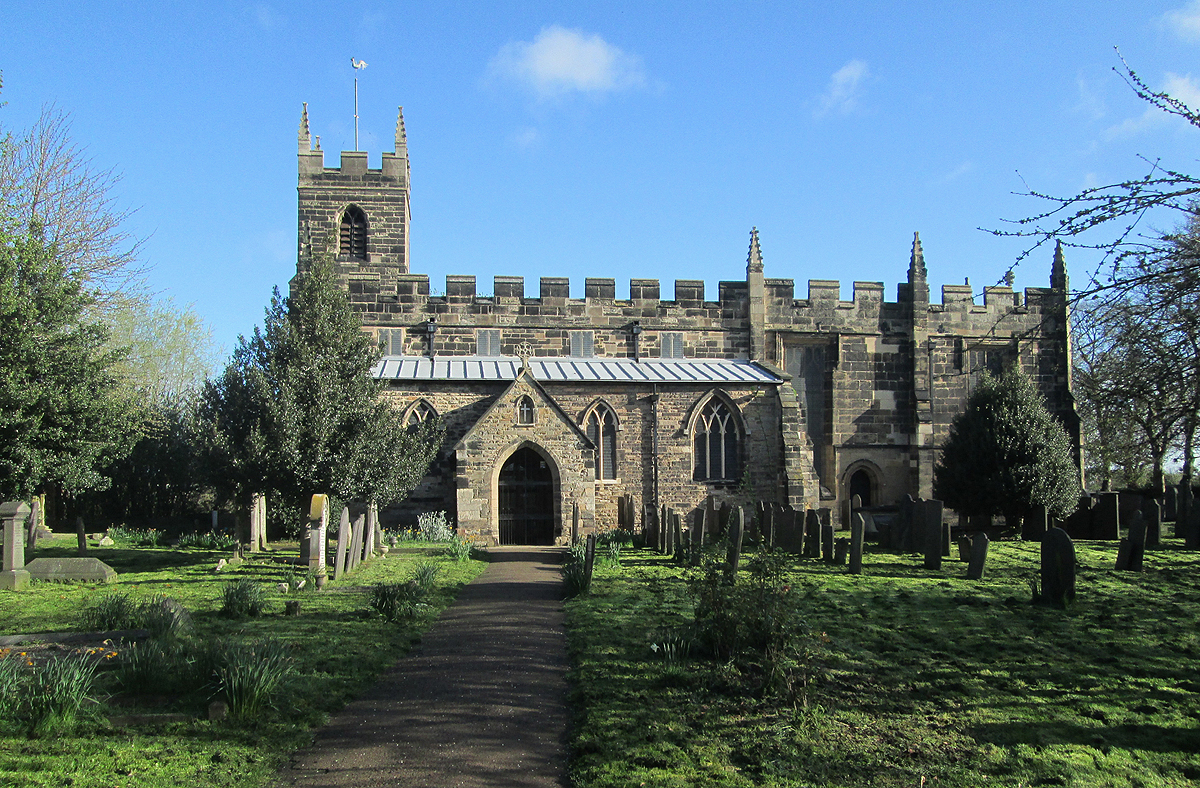
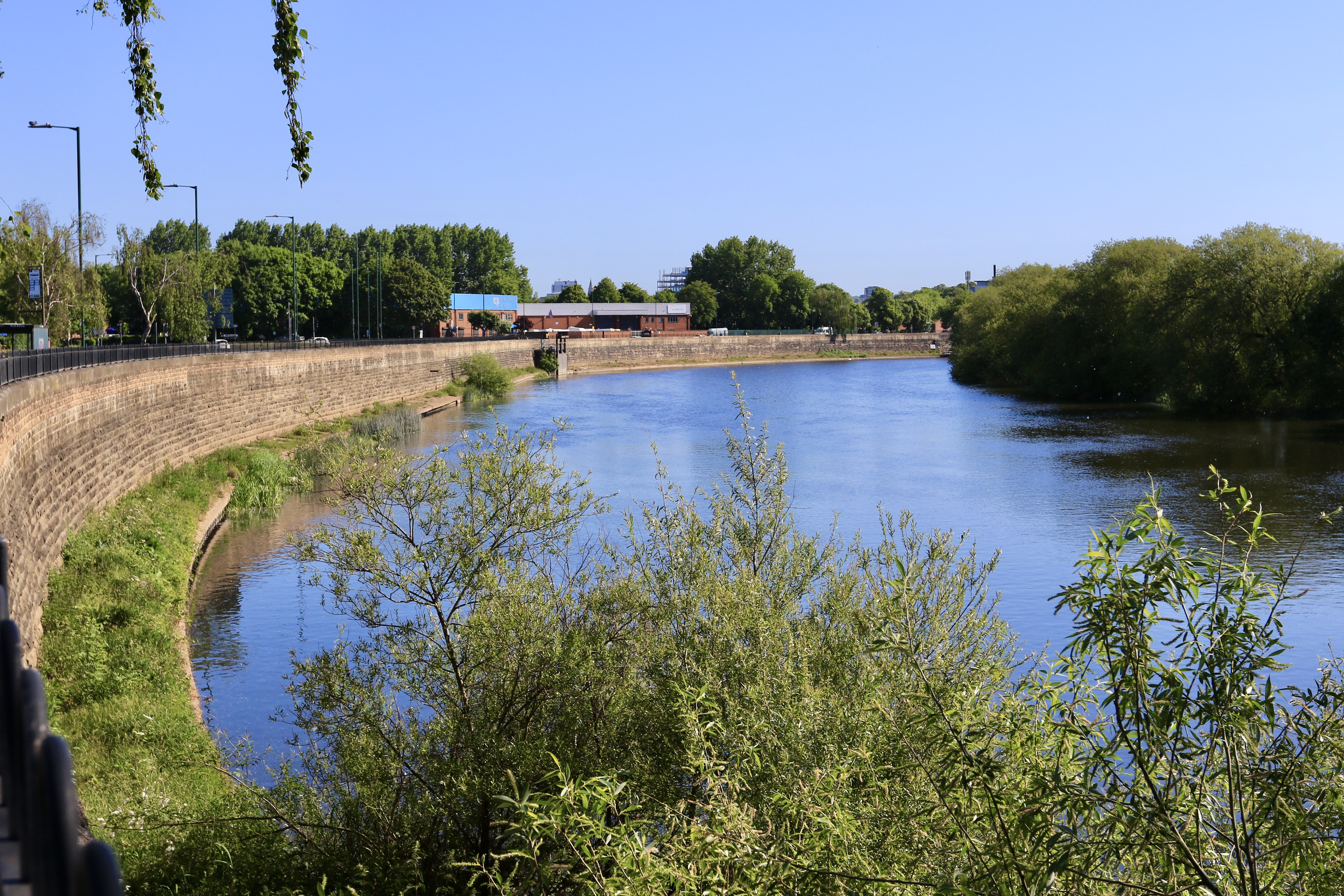
- Glebe Cottage Walk St Wilfred's Church River Trent

- Location within Nottinghamshire
- Population: 4,428
- OS grid reference: SK 56463 36875
- Unitary authority: Nottingham
- Ceremonial county: Nottinghamshire
- Region: East Midlands
- Country: England
- Sovereign state: United Kingdom
- Post town: NOTTINGHAM
- Postcode district: NG11
- Dialling code: 0115
- Police: Nottinghamshire
- Fire: Nottinghamshire
- Ambulance: East Midlands
- UK Parliament: Nottingham South

Wilford is a village and former civil parish in Nottingham, Nottinghamshire, England. It lies to the north-east of Clifton, south-west of West Bridgford, north-west of Ruddington and south-west of Nottingham city centre. Wilford is sited at a meander of the River Trent.

== History ==
=== Civil parish ===
In 1891, the parish had a population of 2,769. In 1894, the parish was abolished and split to form North Wilford and South Wilford.

=== Early settlements ===
Remains of a paved Roman ford, bordered by oak posts, were found in the Trent at Wilford in 1900. The settlement is named as Willesforde in Domesday Book, owned by William Pevrel of Nottingham Castle, who also owned the lands of nearby Clifton. It had a fishery, a priest and 23 sokemen. The land passed to the Clifton family in the 13th century.

=== Development ===
Wilford retained its identity as a village until the later 19th century. Surrounded by woodlands and with riverside amenities such as the Wilford Ferry Inn, the village attracted many visitors from Nottingham. Spencer Hall, the Nottinghamshire poet, wrote in 1846: "Who ever saw Wilford without wishing to become an inmate of one of its peaceful woodbined homes."

In 1870, the Clifton Colliery opened on the north side of the Trent and the area opposite Wilford became industrialised. By the end of the century, the village had changed character, with modern brick-built houses replacing old thatched cottages.

=== Expansion ===
The parish was divided into North Wilford and South Wilford in 1887. The population increased to 4,500 by 1901, almost a ten-fold increase since 1801. The now-demolished coal-fired Wilford Power Station was built in the early 1920s on the north bank of the River Trent. The civil parish of South Wilford became part of West Bridgford urban district in 1935; it is bounded by Fairham Brook to the west, the river Trent to the north, Loughborough Road (historically the King's Road, a Royal Highway) to the east and Landmere Lane to the south.

Wilford was subsumed into the City of Nottingham in 1952, as a land bridge between the city and the newly built Clifton Estate. This diminished the formal territory of Wilford, placing land east of the Great Central Railway in the county and the rest in the city.

Neighbouring estates have been built subsequently on land previously comprising Wilford:

- Silverdale housing estate was built in the late 1950s, on land from the former Wilwell Farm, on the south-western edge of Wilford
- Compton Acres built in 1986 on land from the former Brewill Farm, as well as marshland and a former municipal waste tip on the eastern edge of Wilford; it was previously cut off by the Great Central Railway.

== Education ==
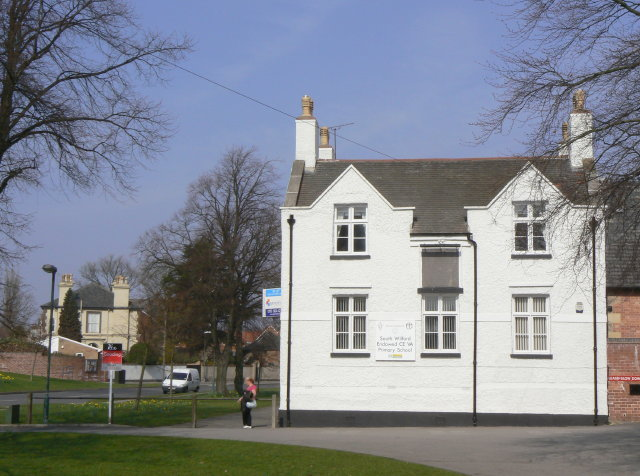
South Wilford Endowed CofE primary school

Within the area of Wilford, there are two primary schools

- St. Patrick's Catholic
- South Wilford Endowed CofE.

The Old School House at South Wilford houses St Wilfrid's Church playgroup and nursery.

There are also two secondary schools:

- The Becket School
- The Nottingham Emmanuel School.

Wilford is also in the catchment area of:

- Farnborough Spencer Academy
- West Bridgford School.

Located nearby is the Clifton Campus of Nottingham Trent University.

== Wilford Church ==
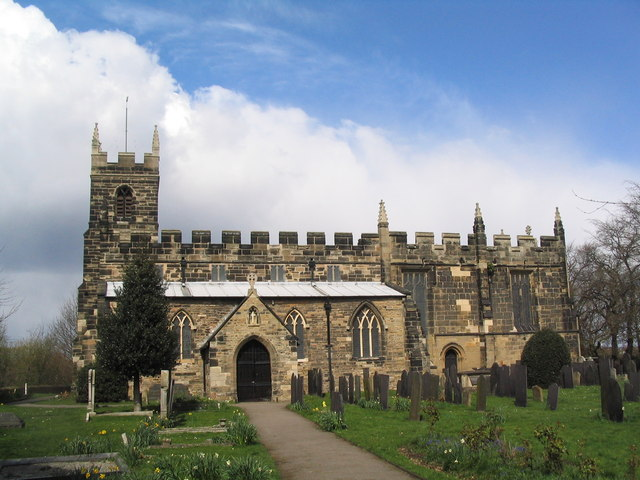
St. Wilfrid's Church

St Wilfrid's Church serves a parish covering Wilford, Silverdale and a large part of the Compton Acres estate. The church dates from the late 14th century; it is considered to have been founded by Gervase de Wilford in around 1361.

The church contains two memorials to the Nottingham poet Henry Kirke White, who drew much of his inspiration from Wilford and Clifton. He is said to have spent much of his time writing poems sat in the churchyard under his favourite tree. The churchyard also contains the grave of Captain John Deane, an adventurer and mercenary who lived in the village.

The churchyard contains war graves of eight soldiers of World War I and an airman of World War II - that of Albert Harvey Iremonger, son of Albert Iremonger - both local residents.

In the churchyard is a gazebo, built in 1757. In 1980, it was restored after a fire four years earlier. Located next to the river Trent, the basement was at one time used as a mortuary.

== Transport ==
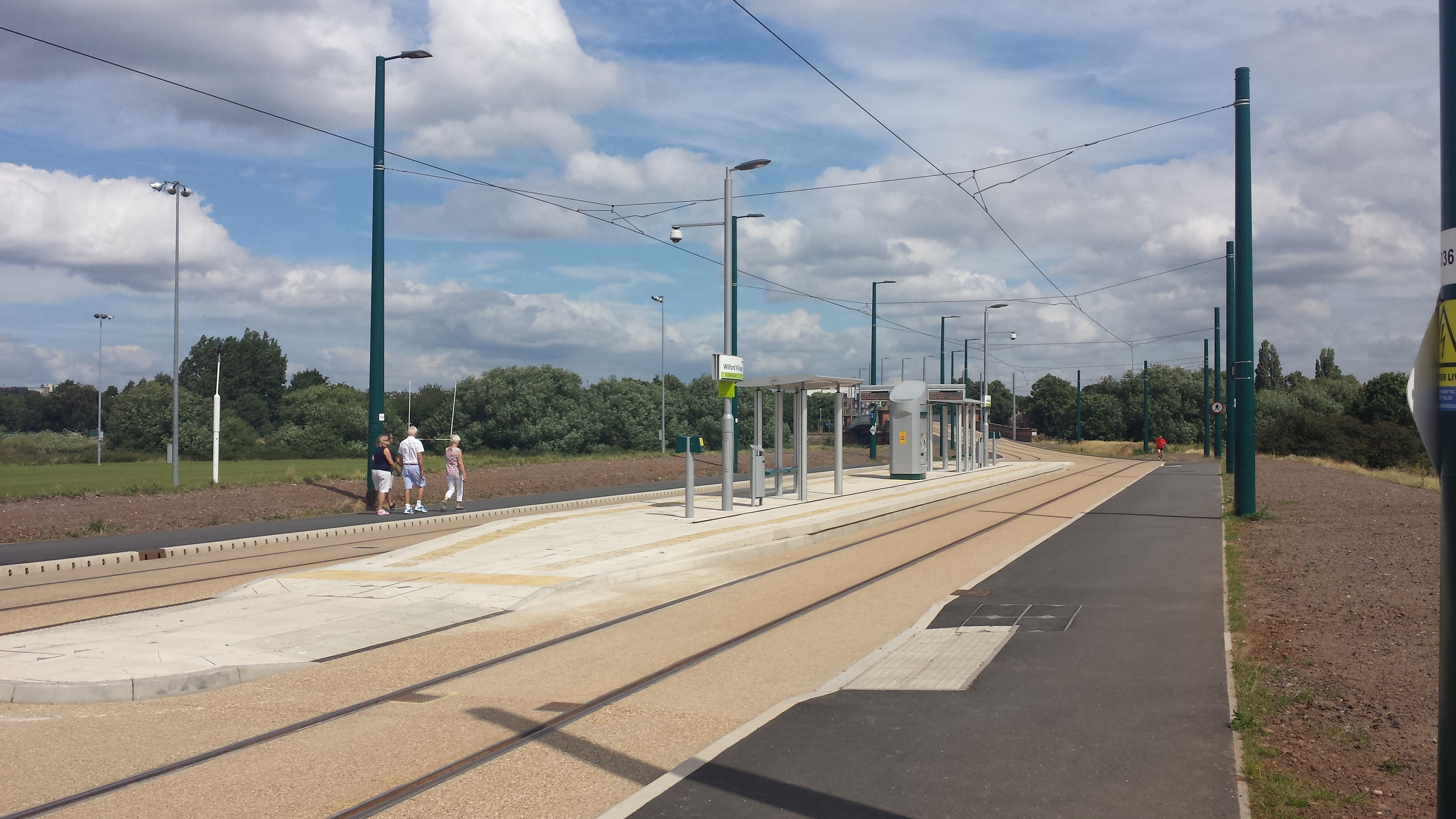
Wilford Village tram stop

Wilford is served by two stops of the Nottingham Express Transit system. Both Wilford Village and Wilford Lane stops are on line 2, linking the city centre to Clifton, and opened in August 2015.

Wilford is served by several local bus routes, operated by Nottingham City Transport and Trent Barton.

== Local amenities ==
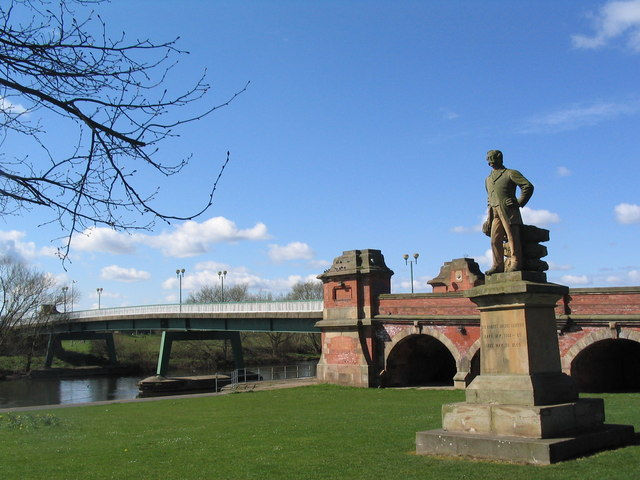
Wilford Toll Bridge c.2010

Wilford Toll Bridge was converted to a foot bridge in the early 1970s; in the late 2010s, it was expanded to accommodate Nottingham Express Transit's second phase extension south of the city to Clifton.

St Wilfrid's Church features two community spaces: the Church Hall and the Benjamin Carter Hall, both adjoined, at the entrance to the Church Paddock. The Carter Hall was built using proceeds left by Benjamin Carter.

Across Wilford Toll Bridge is Victoria Embankment, which hosts the annual Riverside Festival; there is a War Memorial, a park and a children's play-area with a large paddling pool.

Close by is the Gresham Sports Pavilion, which includes an all-weather football pitch and indoor changing facilities.

On Wilford Lane is a large Roko gym. A £20 million development on the neighbouring former site of the Château public house will include a Lidl supermarket, in addition to a smaller gym and Starbucks coffee shop.

== Business ==
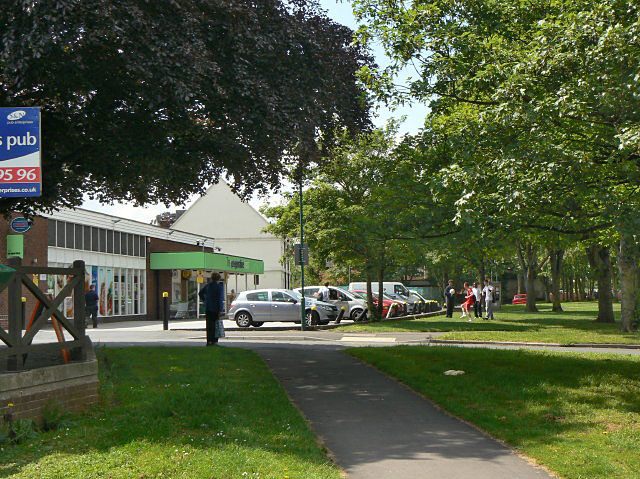
The Co-op at Wilford Green

Gleeds, an architects and surveyors company, had its headquarters in Wilford House; the listed building is underwent a multi-million pound refurbishment in 2021 to house multiple small companies. A number of companies are based at Wilford Industrial Estate, including Seriff, a large supplies distribution company, owing to the area's proximity to the A52 and access to the M1 motorway.

The former Wilford Power Station, closed in 1981 and demolished shortly afterwards, is now the location of the Riverside Retail Park; stores include Boots UK, B&Q and Argos, as well as offices for Experian and the Office of the Public Guardian.

== Nature ==
Wilford has two Green Flag Award-recognised open spaces: Ruddington Lane Park and Iremongers Pond. It also has a number of Sites of Importance for Nature Conservation (SINC):

- Iremongers Pond SINC, which is now cared for by the Iremongers Pond Association
- Gresham Marshes SINC, which is managed by the Nottinghamshire Wildlife Trust
- Trentside SINC
- Wilford Disused Railway is also designated as a SINC
- Wilford Meadow - wildlife area.

The wider Wilford area is home to a number of nature reserves; two are Sites of Special Scientific Interest (SSSI), managed by the Nottinghamshire Wildlife Trust:

- Sharphill Wood
- Wilford Claypit
- Wilford Field
- Wilford Hill wood
- Wilwell Cutting.

== Local landmarks and historic features ==
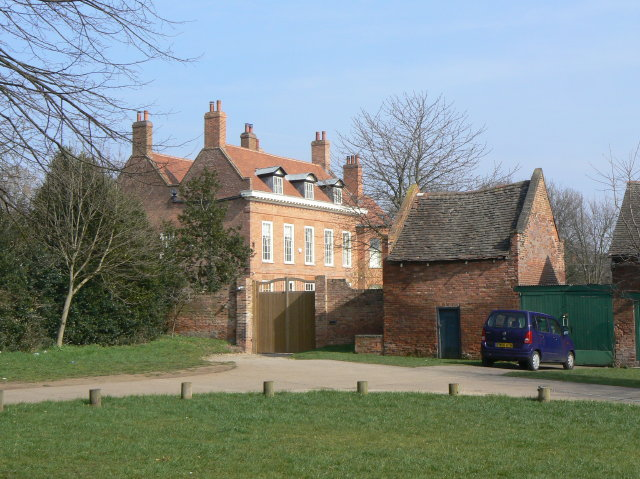
The Old Rectory and Dovecote, St Wilfrid's Church

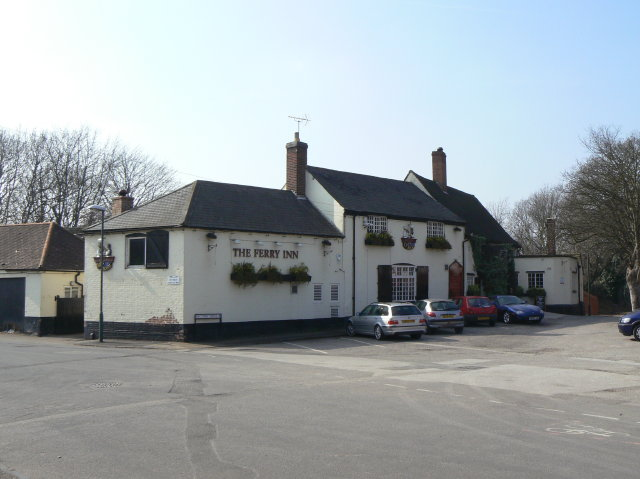
The Ferry Inn, Main Road

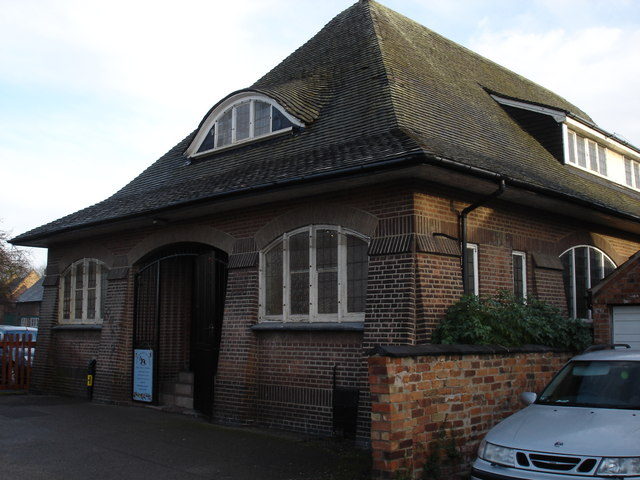
Church Hall and Benjamin Carters Hall

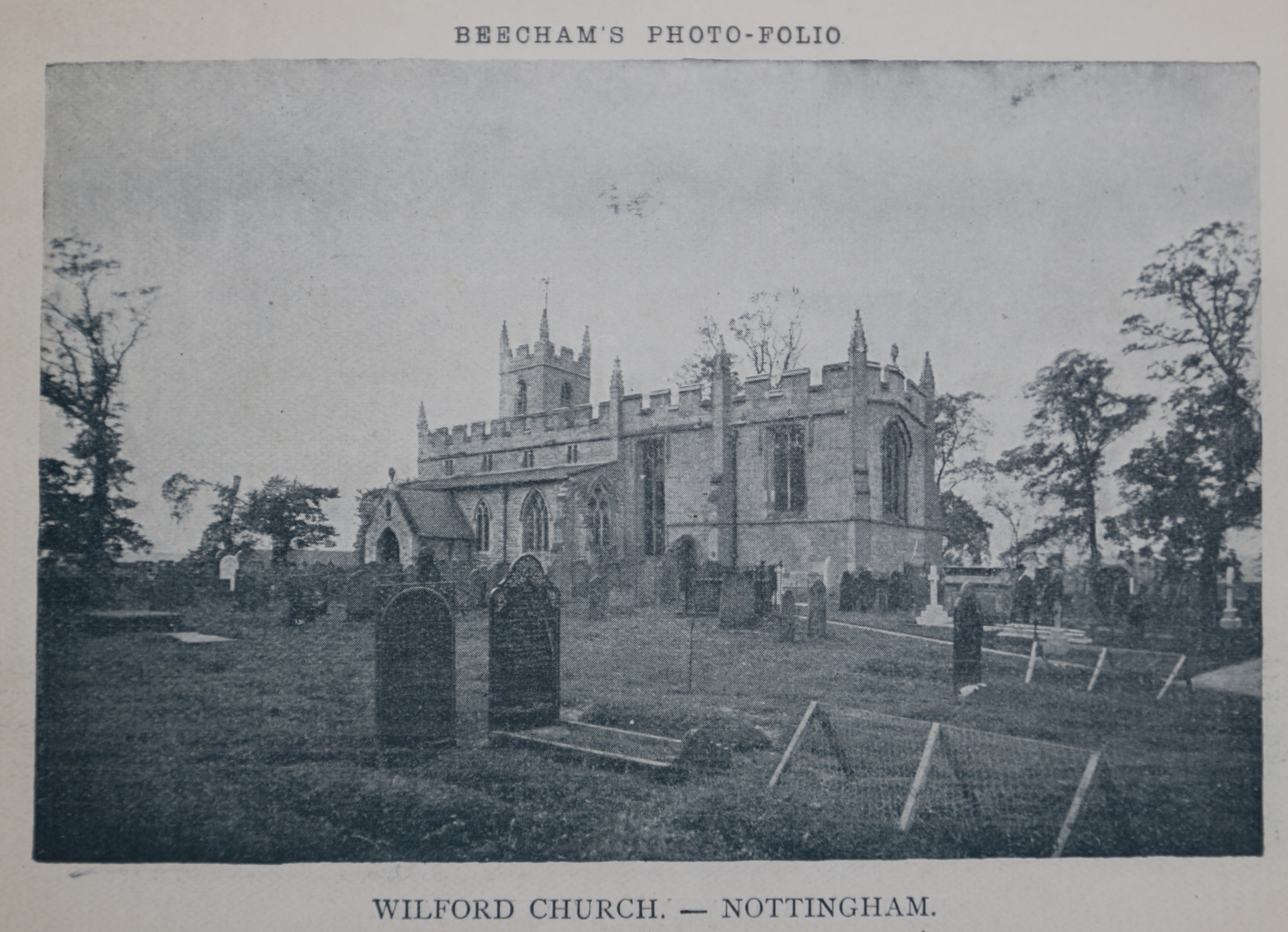
Wilford Church, Nottingham from Beecham's Photo-Folio c.1900

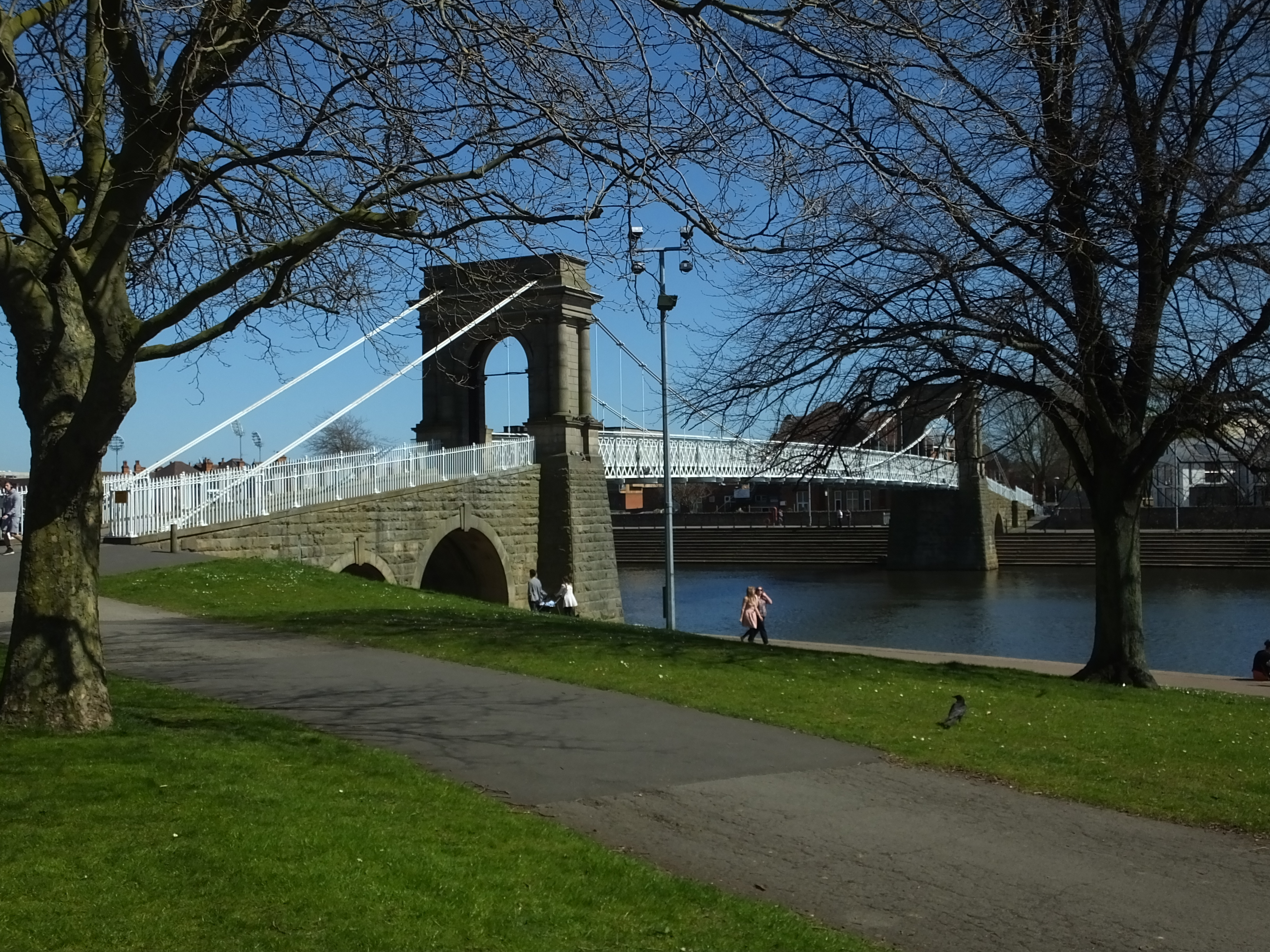
Wilford Suspension Bridge

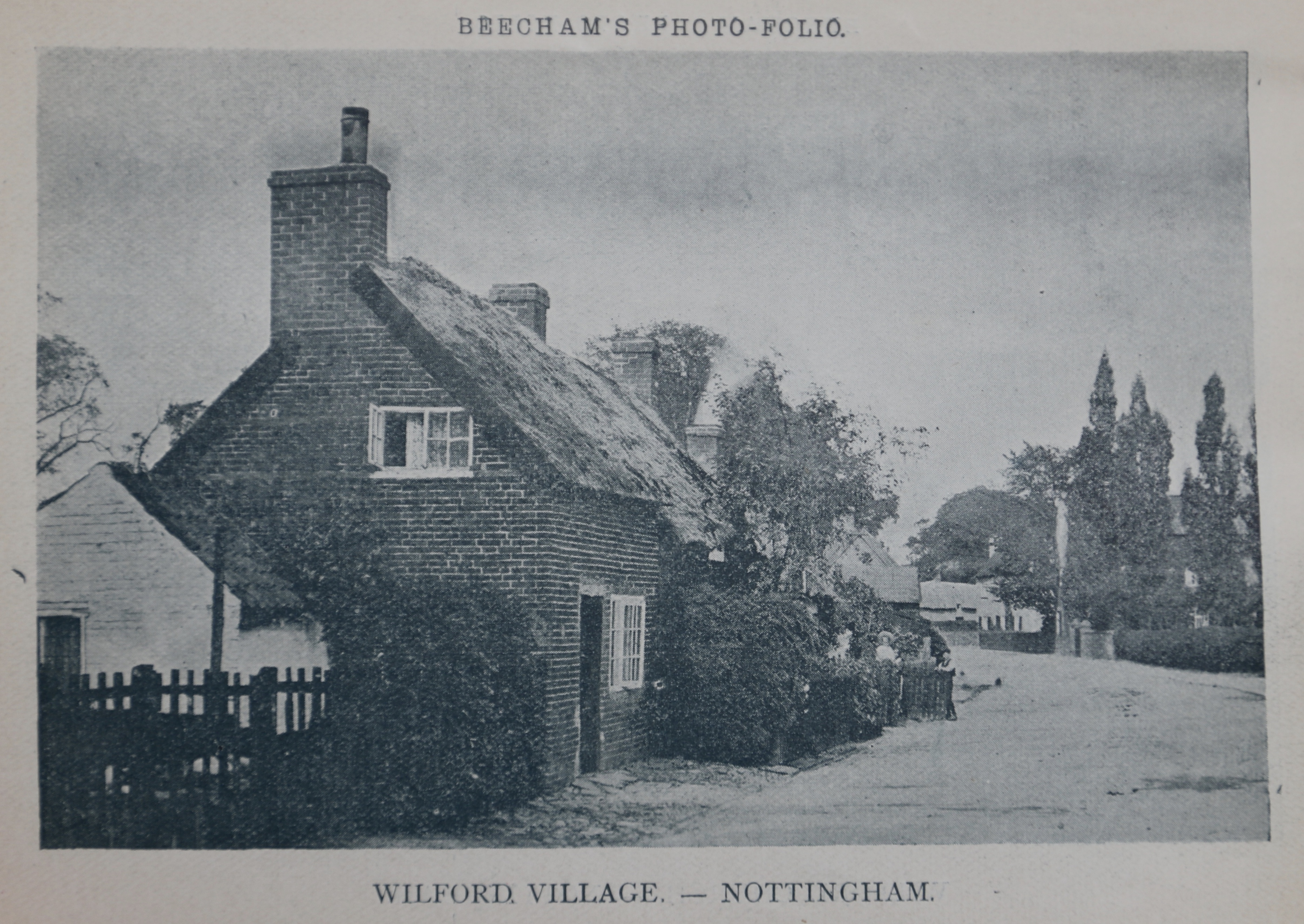
Main Road, Nottingham from Beecham's Photo-Folio c.1900

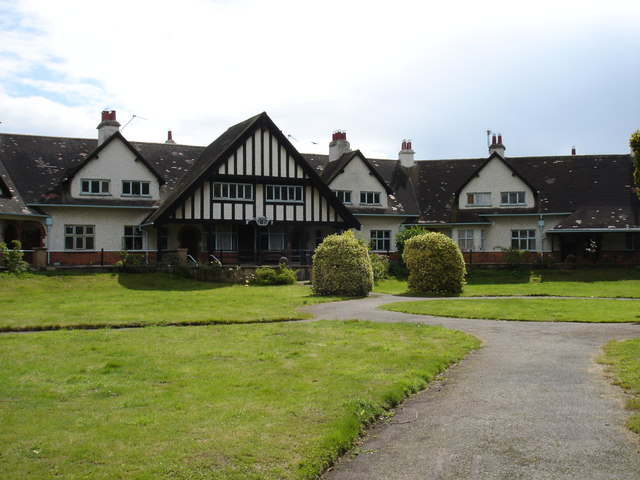
Dorothy Boots Homes

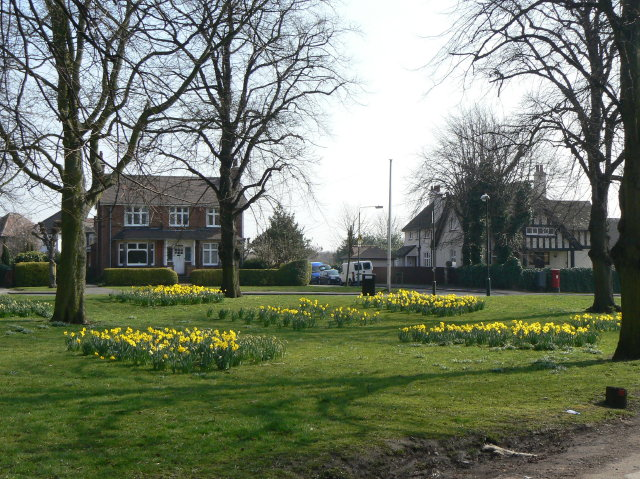
Village Green and The Limes

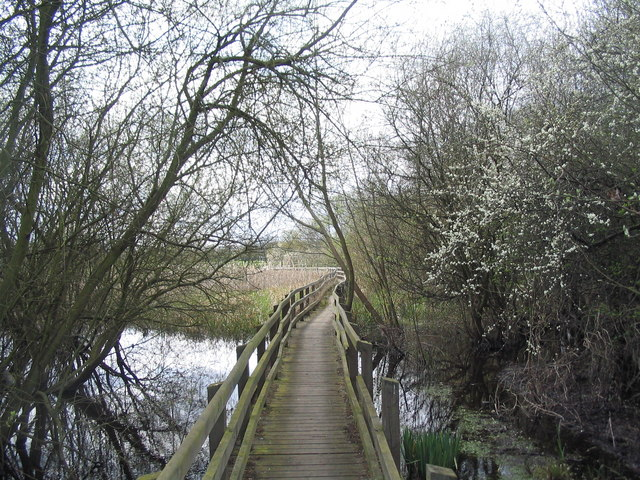
Gresham Marsh, Rushcliffe

== Sport ==
Wilford has a number of sports clubs for football, rugby, basketball, bowls and archery:

- Nottingham Moderns Rugby Club is an amateur rugby club playing in the RFU league system. They have pitches and a clubhouse located between the Ferry Inn pub and the toll bridge.
- Wilford Wasps Basketball Club
- Wilford Mavericks FC
- Wilford Bowls Club (currently closed)
- Wilford Bowmen (shooting takes place in the walled garden at Wollaton Hall).

== Wilfordians ==
Residents of Wilford are known as Wilfordians. The earliest written record of this can be found in Robert Mellors' book, Old Nottingham suburbs: then and now.

=== Notable families ===
Iremonger:

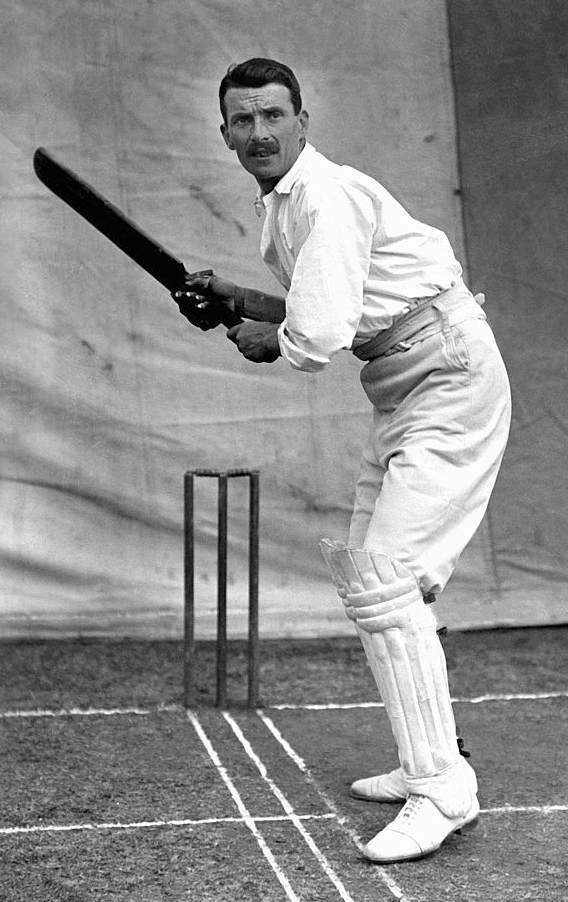
James Iremonger c.1905

- James Iremonger was an English cricketer and noted as one of the players most unlucky never to play Test cricket. James also played football for Nottingham Forest making his debut as a full back in 1896 against Stoke City and earned three caps for England.
- Albert Iremonger was a football goalkeeper and county-class cricketer. He was widely regarded as one of the best goalkeepers of his time and is a local legend in his home county of Nottinghamshire. It is also believed tgat Iremonger was the tallest player in the league at the time, measuring 6 ft 5in. He was landlord of The Ferry Inn until his death in 1958.
- Harry Iremonger was an English professional football goalkeeper, who played in the Football League for Nottingham Forest. Iremonger fought with the 17th (Service) Battalion of the Duke of Cambridge's Own (Middlesex Regiment) during the First World War.
- Albert Harvey Iremonger, born in 1920 to Albert, fought as a Sergeant-Pilot in the RAF. He was killed in action on 14 July 1943, aged 27, and is interred in the graveyard of St Wilfrid's Church.

Smiths:

Smith family coat of arms

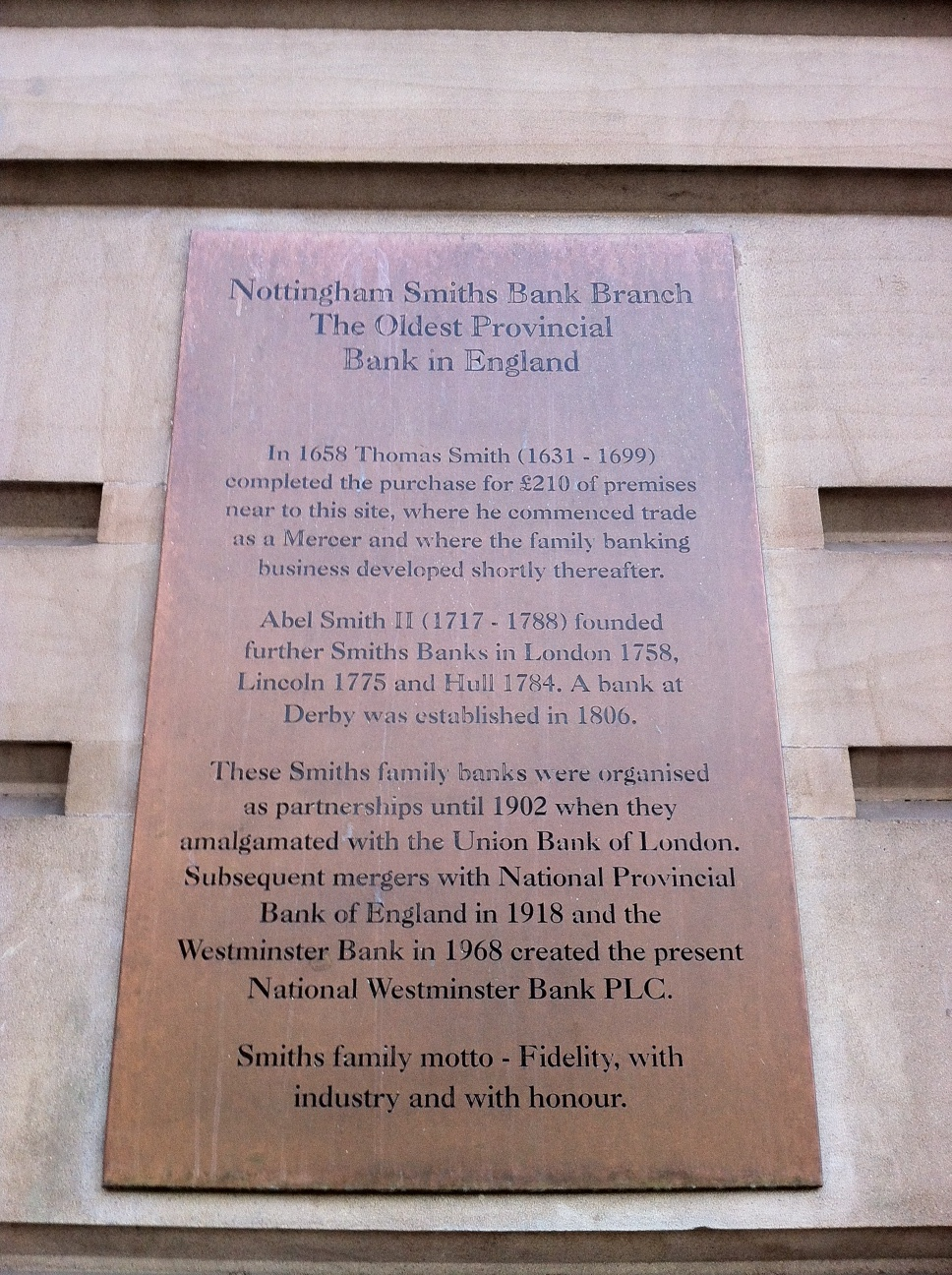
Plaque on Smith's Bank in Nottingham

- Abel Smith II (14 March 1717 – 12 July 1788) was an MP and one of the leading bankers of his time. He was the grandson of Thomas Smith, founder of Smith's Bank, which was believed to be the first bank to be formed outside London. He substantially increased the scale of the enterprise, opening banks in Lincoln, Hull and the London firm of Smith & Payne. His son, Samuel Smith, is believed to have constructed Wilford House on Clifton Lane, where Abel later died in 1788, aged 71. By way of marriage, he was the uncle of William Wilberforce, the noted campaigner for the abolition of slavery.
- Abel Smith III was the second son of Abel Smith II, a Nottingham banker and an MP. Abel was elected for the Nottingham constituency; however, he died only three months later.
- Robert Smith, 1st Baron Carrington was the third son of Abel Smith (1717–1788), a wealthy Nottingham banker; he succeeded his elder brother Abel (1748–1779) as MP for the Nottingham constituency; he was re-elected in 1780, 1784, 1790 and 1796. In 1796, he was raised to the Peerage of Ireland as Baron Carrington of Bulcote Lodge. The following year, he was made Baron Carrington of Upton in the County of Nottingham, in the Peerage of Great Britain and had to vacate his seat in the House of Commons.
- Samuel Smith was the fourth son of Abel Smith II, a wealthy Nottingham banker and MP. Smith entered Parliament in 1788 as member for St Germans, and was an MP for the next 44 years, also representing Leicester (1790–1818), Midhurst (1818–1820) and Wendover (1820–1832). In 1826, being the longest continually-serving MP, he became Father of the House.
- George Smith was the fifth son of Abel Smith II, a wealthy Nottingham banker and MP. Smith entered Parliament in 1791 as member for Lostwithiel; he also represented Midhurst and Wendover in a parliamentary career spread over forty years.
- John Smith was the sixth son of Abel Smith II, a wealthy Nottingham banker and MP. Smith served as a Tory for Wendover from 1802 to 1806 and later represented Nottingham from 1806 to 1818, Midhurst from 1818 to 1830, Chichester from 1830 to 1831, and Buckinghamshire from 1831 to 1835.
- Henry Smith (1794-1874) was the third son of Samuel Smith. He is known for building the infant school, located on Main Road in Wilford, and was High Sheriff of Nottinghamshire in 1841.

=== Individuals ===
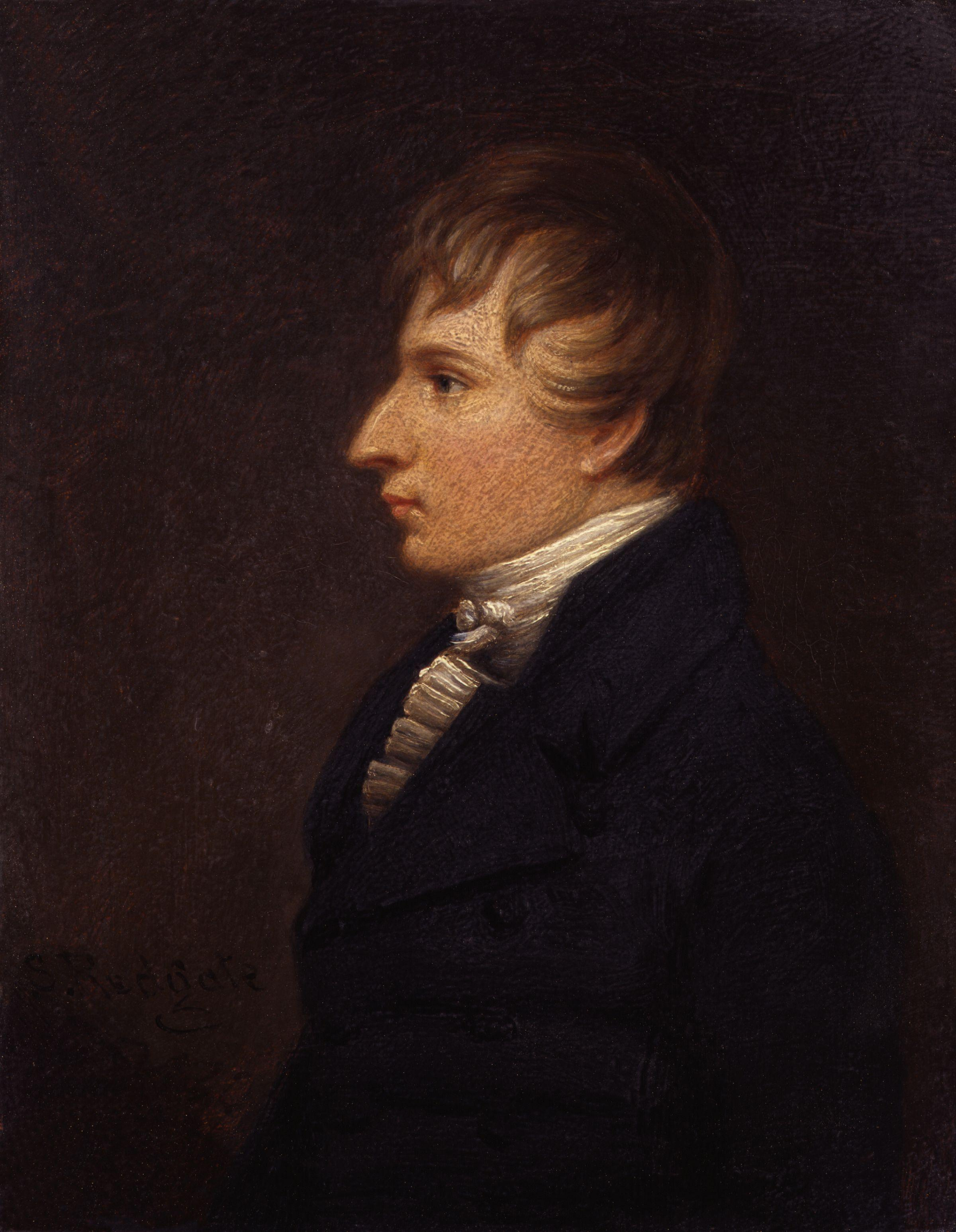
Henry Kirke White by Thomas Barber

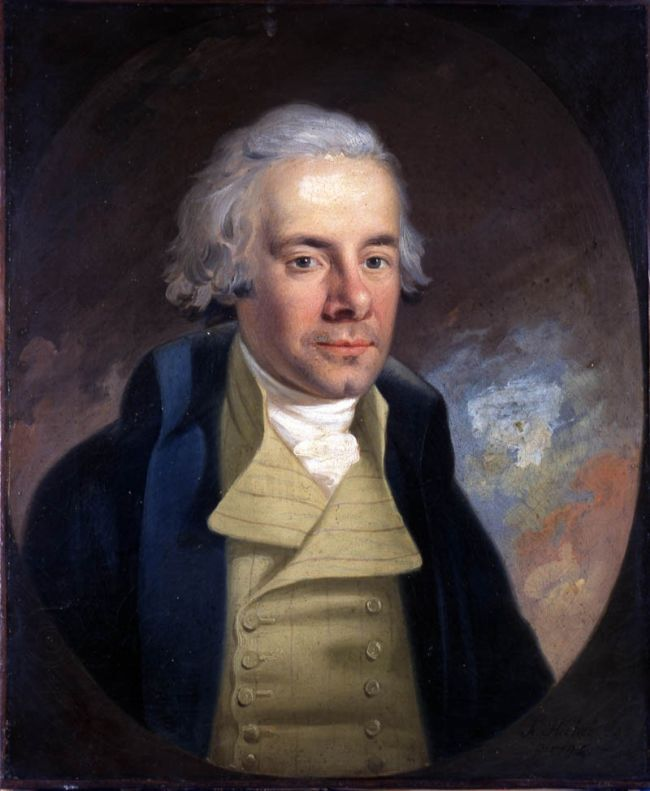
William Wilberforce

- Catherine Foster, an English operatic soprano internationally renowned for her roles in stage works by Richard Strauss and Richard Wagner, such as the title role of Elektra and Brünnhilde in Der Ring des Nibelungen, a role in which she performed at the Bayreuth Festival in 2013 for Wagner's bicentenary.
- Brendan Clarke-Smith, a British Conservative Party politician and former teacher. He was elected as the MP for Bassetlaw in the 2019 general election.
- Marjorie Bates lived in The Grange (now Grange Close). She was an artist specialising in watercolour and pastels, who painted a number of views of the village.
- Harry Cursham (27 November 1859 – 6 August 1941) was born in The Grange (now Grange Close) and was an English footballer and cricketer. He played football mostly for Notts County, as well as cricket for Nottinghamshire CCC. Cursham holds the individual goalscoring record for the FA Cup, with 49 goals in 44 games. He also played eight games for the England national football team, scoring five goals.
- Laura Knight, distantly related to Majorie Bates, visited the village many times, also basing much of her work on the surrounding environment.
- Captain John Deane, an adventurer and mercenary, lived in the village. His ship The Nottingham Galley sank off the coast of Boon Island, New England in 1710. Deane and his crew, trapped on the island, were forced to cannibalise a corpse, shortly before being rescued. Deane subsequently served in the Russian navy, under Peter the Great, and retired to Wilford in 1736. He is buried in the grounds of St Wilfrid's Church.
- Henry Kirke White (1785–1806) lived at Wilford Crossroads, opposite Wilford House, between 1804 and 1805. He drew inspiration for much of his poetry from Wilford and the surrounding area. He died one year later having left to study at St John's College, Cambridge.
- William Wilberforce regularly stayed at Wilford House, the seat of his uncle, Abel Smith (1717–1788) often for months at a time. Wilberforce stayed for several months between the years of 1786 and 1789, during the height of his campaign for the abolition of slavery. Abel Smith (1717–1788), son of Samuel Smith (1754–1834), was a close friend and colleague; he was chosen by Wilberforce to be the executor of his will.
- Jeremiah Brandreth was born here in 1785. In 1817, he participated in a conspiracy to overthrow the government, was arrested, tried for treason and hung with two accomplices. Their corpses were decapitated with an axe.
- Rev. Benjamin Carter founded the local primary school, whilst also establishing much housing and charitable help throughout Wilford.
- Jesse Boot built the Dorothy Boot Homes (11 homes, a clubroom and library) in Wilford in 1908, for veterans of the Crimean War and Indian Mutiny.
- Thomas Forman, founder of the Nottingham Post, bought Wilford House from the Smith family following the newspaper's successful launch.

== See also ==
- List of Sites of Special Scientific Interest in Nottinghamshire
- Listed buildings in Nottingham (Clifton North ward)
- Wilford Suspension Bridge.
