= Listed buildings in Nottingham (Clifton North ward) =

Clifton North is a former electoral ward in the city of Nottingham, England. The ward contained 22 listed buildings that are recorded in the National Heritage List for England. Of these, one is listed at Grade II*, the middle of the three grades, and the others are at Grade II, the lowest grade. The ward contained the village of Wilford and the surrounding area, including part of the village of Clifton. The listed buildings include a church and items in the churchyard, houses, cottages and associated structures, a public house, a former rectory, a dovecote and an associated mounting block, schools and associated structures, an almshouse and its surrounding fence, and a telephone kiosk.

== Key ==
| Grade | Criteria |
|---|---|
| II* | Particularly important buildings of more than special interest |
| II | Buildings of national importance and special interest |

== Buildings ==
| Name and location | Photograph | Date | Notes | Grade |
|---|---|---|---|---|
| St Wilfrid's Church, Wilford; 52.93466°N 1.15882°W | | Late 14th century | The church has been altered and extended through the centuries, including a restoration and additions by Naylor and Sale in 1890–92. It is built in stone with lead roofs, and consists of a nave with a clerestory, north and south aisles, a south porch, a chancel, a northeast vestry with a porch, and a northwest tower. The tower has two stages, buttresses, a west doorway with a chamfered surround, two-light bell openings, and an embattled parapet with crocketed pinnacles. There are also embattled parapets and crocketed pinnacles on the body of the church. | II* |
| Hunters' Farm; 52.92720°N 1.16031°W | | 17th century | A farmhouse, later a private house, with a timber-framed core, walls in brick, mainly painted or rendered, a floor band, and a tile roof with brick coped gables. There are two storeys and three bays, and two parallel rear wings. The windows are casements. Inside there is exposed timber framing and an inglenook fireplace. | II |
| Ferry Inn; 52.93483°N 1.15712°W | | Late 17th century | The public house has been converted from two houses and an outbuilding, end to end. It is in painted and rendered brick with some exposed timber framing at the rear, on a rendered plinth, and has roofs of slate and tile. The central block has two storeys and two bays, and dentilled eaves, and contains casement windows. The right range has a gabled porch, and contains a horizontally-sliding sash window. | II |
| Wilford Rectory; 52.93444°N 1.15809°W | | c. 1720 | The former rectory is in red brick on a rendered plinth, with stone dressings, a floor band, an eaves band, a dentilled eaves cornice, and tile roofs with coped gables. There are two storeys and attics, a double range plan, and five bays. Half-round steps lead up to a central doorway with a fanlight, and the windows are sashes. In the attic are dormers with triangular and segmental pediments. To the right is an extension with two storeys, and canted two-storey bay windows at the front and rear. There is a round-arched stair window, and three dormers with hipped roofs. | II |
| Dovecote and mounting block, Wilford Rectory; 52.93420°N 1.15836°W | | c. 1720 | The dovecote is in red brick, and has a roof of tile and pantile with coped gables and kneelers. There is a single storey and a single bay, and it contains a doorway and blocked flight holes. To the left is a square brick mounting block, with steps and a stone slab top. | II |
| The Elms; 52.93337°N 1.15627°W | — | Early 18th century | A house, later divided, in red brick, with a floor band, an eaves band and a tile roof. There are two storeys and attics and an L-shaped plan, with a front range of five bays. The central doorway has a fanlight and a hood on brackets, and the windows are sashes with flat brick arches. The rear wing is lower and has a rendered ground floor, a slate roof, two storeys and three bays. | II |
| Thorn House; 52.93342°N 1.15704°W | — | Early 18th century | The house is in red brick with painted brick dressings, lintel bands, and a pantile roof with coped gables. There are two storeys and attics and an L-shaped plan, with a front range of five bays. The doorway has a fanlight, and a shell hood on iron columns, and the windows are sashes with painted brick flat arches. To the left is a single-bay stable with a slate roof and a coped gable. | II |
| Wilford Endowed School and wall 52.93159°N 1.15879°W | | 1736 | The original building is in colourwashed roughcast, on a plinth, with a floor band, and a tile roof with coped gables. There are two storeys and three bays, and a double range plan. The windows are cross-casements, in the middle bay of the upper floor is an inscribed slate tablet, and the outer bays contain gabled through-eaves dormers. A classroom block was added in 1868, in red brick on a plinth, with stone dressings, quoins, and a slate roof with a tile crest. There is a single storey and attics, an E-shaped plan and three bays. The central bay has a shaped gable with a finial, containing a clock face, the outer bays have gables with bargeboards and finials, and between the gables are box dormers. The boundary wall is in brick with brick coping and contains two pairs of square gate piers. | II |
| Gazebo; 52.93492°N 1.15894°W | | 1757 | The gazebo is in the churchyard of St Wilfrid's Church, Wilford, to the north of the church. It is in red brick with dentilled eaves, and a pyramidal tile roof with a finial. There is a single storey and a basement, and a hexagonal plan. The gazebo contains an elliptical-arched doorway, four barred windows with brick arches and cornice keystones, and the basement has a segmental-arched doorway. | II |
| Tomb of Captain John Deane; 52.93446°N 1.15863°W | — | 1761 | The tomb is of Captain John Deane, and is in the churchyard of St Wilfrid's Church, Wilford, to the south of the church. It is a chest tomb in red brick with a stone base and top, and there is an inscribed slate tablet on the north side. The tomb is enclosed by a wrought iron railing with corner posts and finials. | II |
| 93 Main Road, Wilford; 52.93270°N 1.15861°W | | Late 18th century | Two cottages and a shop in painted brick with a tile roof. There are two storeys and three bays, and a continuous rear lean-to. The ground floor contains a shop front with pilasters and a cornice, and doorways, and the windows are horizontally-sliding sashes. | II |
| Wilford House; 52.92523°N 1.16112°W | | 1781 | A country house, later offices, in red brick on a plinth, with stone and stucco dressings, a floor band, a dentilled eaves cornice, a parapet and hipped slate roofs. There are three storeys and five bays. The central doorway has a stucco surround and a cornice, a fanlight and sidelights. The windows are sashes with flat brick arches. To the right is a later extension with two storeys and two bays. | II |
| Former Stable Block, Wilford House; 52.92619°N 1.16070°W | | 1781 | The main block of the former stable block is in red brick on a rendered plinth, with stone dressings, an impost band, dentilled eaves and a hipped slate roof. There are two storeys and five bays. The middle bay projects under a pediment containing a round window. Below is an elliptical-arched carriage entrance, above which are rectangular and round blanks. The outer bays contain round arches containing windows, and in the upper floor are casement and sash windows. At the rear are irregular ranges. | II |
| 36 Main Road, Wilford; 52.92756°N 1.15959°W | | 1828 | A school, later converted into a house, in colourwashed brick, with stone dressings, and a slate roof with coped gables. There is a single storey and attics, and five bays. In the centre is a gabled porch with a Tudor arched double door. The windows are casements, and all the openings have hood moulds. | II |
| Churchyard gateway, wall and railings, St Wilfrid's Church, Wilford; 52.93419°N 1.15889°W | — | c. 1868 | Flanking the entrance to the churchyard are two square stone gate piers with pyramidal caps, between them are cast iron double gates and a wrought iron overthrow, and to the right is a single gate. On the left is a short stone wall, and to the right is a railing about 15 metres (49 ft) long. | II |
| Clifton School; 52.90835°N 1.18708°W | | 1871 | The school, later the village hall, is in red brick on a chamfered plinth, with stone dressings, chamfered quoins, dentilled eaves and a slate roof. There is a single storey and three bays. The middle bay projects slightly, and has a shaped elaborately gable with a bell turret and a wind vane, and it contains a datestone and a coat of arms. The windows are cross-casements, the central window with a mullion and a segmental pediment, and the outer windows with cornices. | II |
| School House; 52.90841°N 1.18724°W | | 1871 | The house is in red brick on a plinth, with stone dressings, dentilled eaves, and a slate roof with a dentilled gable. There are two storeys and an L-shaped plan, with two bays, the left bay projecting and gabled. The doorway is in the angle and has a hipped hood on brackets, and the windows are cross-casements. | II |
| Boundary wall and railings, School and School House; 52.90823°N 1.18713°W | | 1871 | The boundary wall is in red brick with chamfered stone coping and a traceried wrought iron railing, and it extends for about 25 metres (82 ft). At each end is a square brick pier with a pyramidal cap, and the wall contains two gateways. | II |
| Glebe Cottages; 52.93354°N 1.15804°W | | Late 19th century | A row of six cottages in red brick, with dressings in tile and brick, a floor band, and slate roofs. There are two storeys and six bays. The windows are casements, and all the openings have segmental heads. The upper floor windows are through-eaves dormers under gables with bargeboards. | II |
| Dorothy Boot Homes and wall 52.93259°N 1.15752°W | | 1908 | A group of eleven almshouses in roughcast brick, with applied timber framing and tile roofs, forming a half-butterfly plan, with seven bays. The windows are casements with mullions and transoms, and the doorways have round arches. In the centre is a huge jettied gable with close studding, under which is a verandah with two canted bay windows. The outer bays have gabled half-dormers, and there are smaller jettied gables on the left bay and in the left return. In front of the houses is a sunken garden and a stone terrace wall with pedestals and ball finials. | II |
| Gate piers and fence, Dorothy Boot Homes; 52.93262°N 1.15829°W | | c. 1920 | The grounds are enclosed by a paling fence on stone plinths. In the centre is a pair of square gate piers with ball finial]]s and wooden gates, and there is another gateway to the left. | II |
| Telephone kiosk 52.93288°N 1.15791°W | — | 1935 | The K6 type telephone kiosk At the junction of Main Road and Holly Avenue was designed by Giles Gilbert Scott. Constructed in cast iron with a square plan and a dome, it has three unperforated crowns in the top panels. | II |
