= St Wilfrid's Church, Wilford =

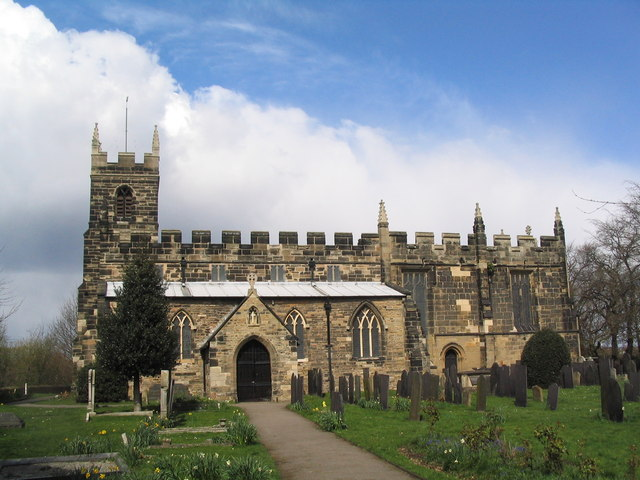
- St Wilfrid's Church, Wilford
- St Wilfrid's Church, Wilford
- 52°56′5.29″N 1°9′32.57″W
- OS grid reference: SK 56633 37797
- Location: Wilford
- Country: England
- Denomination: Church of England
- Website: wilford.org/church/

History
- Dedication: St Wilfrid

Architecture
- Heritage designation: Grade II* listed

Administration
- Diocese: Diocese of Southwell and Nottingham
- Archdeaconry: Nottingham
- Deanery: West Bingham
- Parish: Wilford

St Wilfrid's Church, Wilford is a Grade II* listed parish church in the Church of England in Wilford, Nottinghamshire, England.

== History ==
The church dates from the late 14th century. It is considered to have been founded by Gervase de Wilford around 1361. The porch, nave and chancel arch are original with the tower and chancel built in the 1400s. The graveyard includes graves dating from the 1300s. Fragments of walling at the east end of the nave are considered to be relics of the pre-conquest church. The church features a wide variety of locally quarried stone from locations including Gedling, Castle Donington, Trowell and Bulwell. The stonework was heavily dirtied by the now-demolished Wilford Power Station across the river. There are medieval Mass Clocks or etched sundials, used to provide timings for gatherers. A pig-like carving on the ridge of the south roof is thought to be over 900 years old. The nave was re-roofed in 1935, and the chancel in 1960. The Church is Grade II* listed.

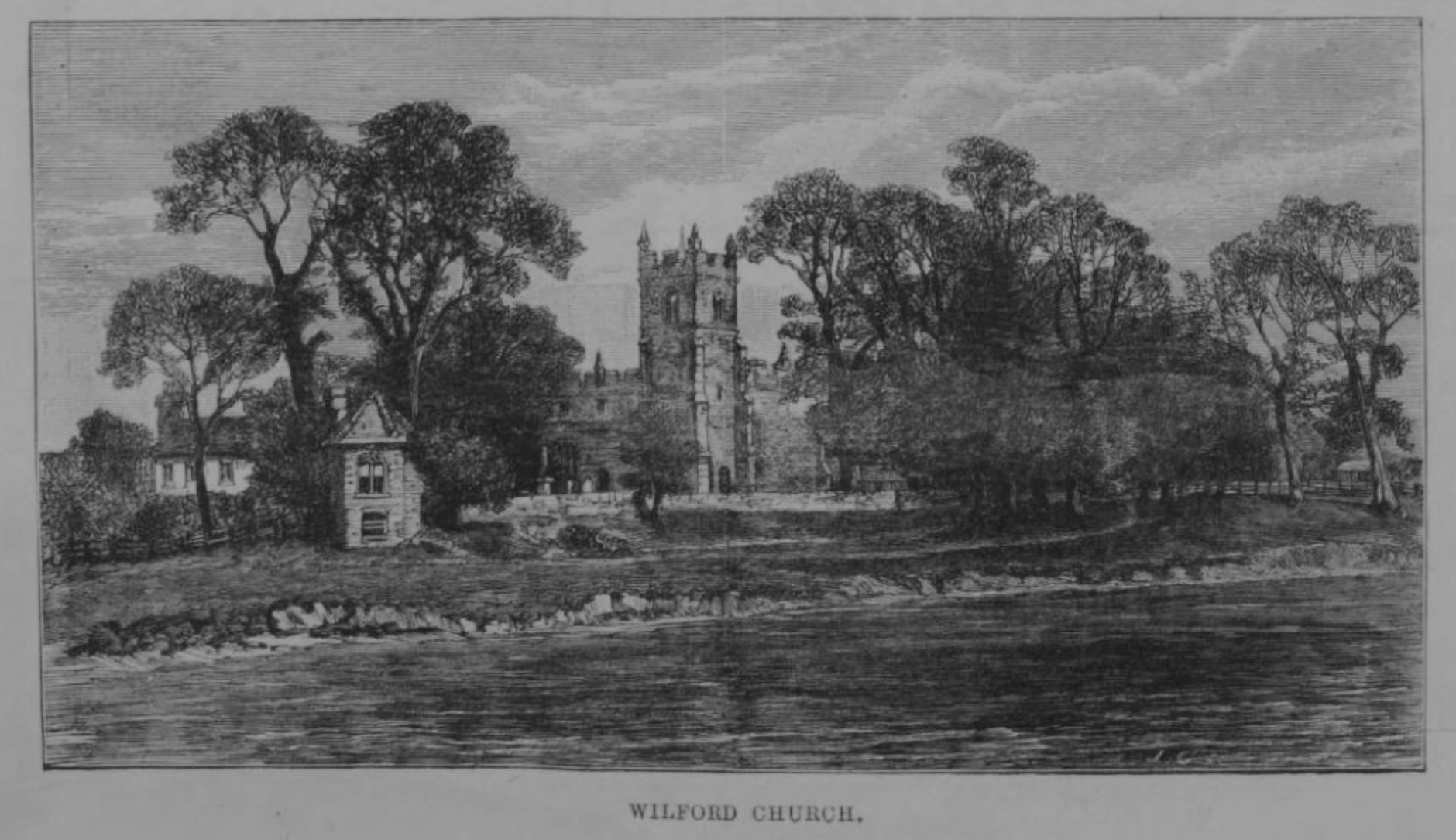
Wilford Church, Illustrated London News, 7 July 1888

The churchyard contains war graves of eight soldiers of World War I and an airman of World War II.

The churchyard also contains the grave of Captain John Deane, an adventurer and mercenary, lived in the village. His ship The Nottingham Galley sank off the coast of Boon Island, New England in 1710. Deane and his crew, trapped on the island, were forced to cannibalise a corpse shortly before being rescued. Deane subsequently served in the Russian navy under Peter the Great, and retired to Wilford in 1736. The chest tomb and railings are Grade II listed.

In the churchyard is a gazebo built in 1757 by Henry Tull as an elegant summer house for parishioners. In 1980 it was restored after a fire four years earlier as 'a preserved structure by community industry' according to a plaque inside it. The flooring was lost and not restored but the original roofing survived. Located next to the River Trent the basement was at one time used as a mortuary. It was the custom in the 18th and 19th century for Coroner's Inquests to be held in the porch of a parish church. With a ferry, a difficult ford nearby and a far more dangerous ford a little higher upstream, Coroner's Inquests must have been frequent at Wilford and a mortuary, therefore, became a necessity. The gazebo is Grade II listed.

In 1915 part of the parish was divided to create St Faith's Church, Nottingham.

== Benjamin Carter ==
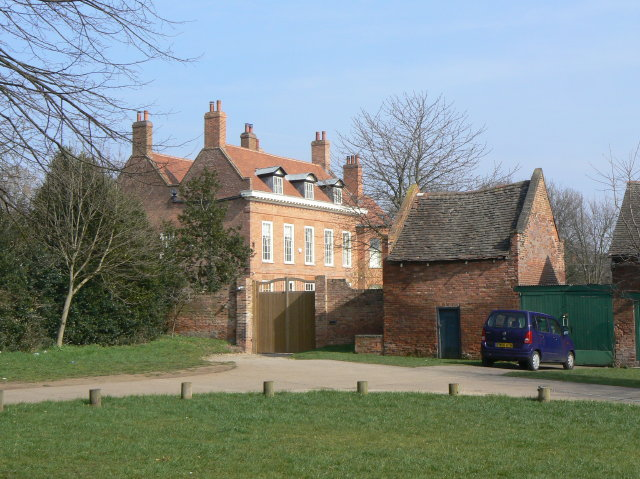
The Old Rectory and Dovecote

Benjamin Carter (c.1667–1732) was Rector of St Wilfrid's from 1694 to 1732, and was a great benefactor for the local community and congregation. He endowed the present church school, South Wilford CofE Primary School; built the rectory c.1720 with its barn, stables, and dovecot; and left money for various charitable purposes.

The charity, Carters Educational Foundation continues to be responsible for the endowment left by Carter in a deed dated 1727 and in his will. By his will he gave £200 to erecting a school, and convenient lodging, and £400 as augmentation to the charity. The foundation's priority remains the successful running of South Wilford Endowed Church of England Primary School; it also supports the education and the social and physical development of the young people of the ancient parish of Wilford, through individual and group grants. In 2020 the charity had income of £368,000 from its investment in London office buildings.

Carter was also chaplain to the Duke of Devonshire, and held rectorships elsewhere from 1700; in 1705 he was made a canon of Southwell.

He gave Communion Plate to the church in 1717. Some of it is still in use, although several items stolen in 1974 were later replaced by modern silver.

The rectory was sold in the 1990s and a new rectory was built adjacently. The church paddock flanked by the Church, Old Rectory and New Rectory also includes the dovecote and outhouses built under Carter in addition to the Church Hall and Benjamin Carter Hall, named in his honour.

Carter died in 1732, and was buried in the chancel, but no stone marks his resting place.

== Henry Kirke White ==
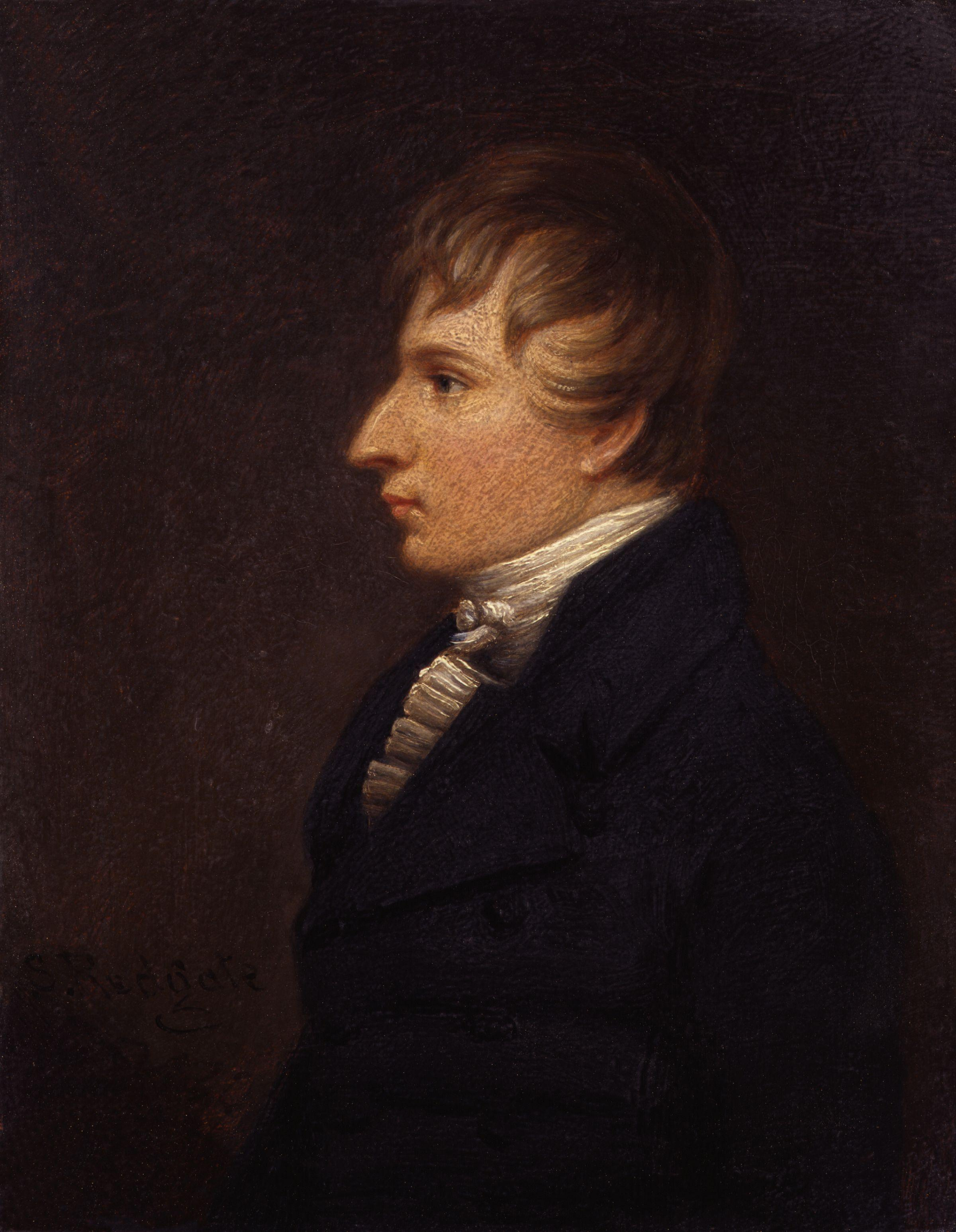
Henry Kirke White

The poet Henry Kirke White (21 March 1785 – 19 October 1806) lived in Wilford at the crossroads, opposite Wilford House, between 1804 and 1805. He drew inspiration for much of his poetry from Wilford and the surrounding area. He wrote many of his poems in the gazebo which stands in the grounds of St Wilfrid's Church. Here he wrote:-

Here would I wish to sleep, this is the spot
Which I have long marked out to lay my bones in.
Tired out and wearied with the riotous world,
Beneath this yew would I be sepulchred.

Kirke White died at the age of 21 whilst studying at St John's College, Cambridge. He was buried in the church of All Saints Jewry, Cambridge, which stood opposite the gates of St John's College. St Wilfrid's Church has two memorials to Kirke White: a marble plaque inside the nave, and a memorial stained glass window, c.1870, by O'Connor.

== Organ ==
The organ dates from 1878 by Henry Willis. A specification of the organ can be found on the National Pipe Organ Register.

== See also ==
- Grade II* listed buildings in Nottinghamshire
- Listed buildings in Nottingham (Clifton North ward)
