= Albert Iremonger =

English footballer and cricketer

Personal information
- Date of birth: 15 June 1884
- Place of birth: Wilford, England
- Date of death: 9 March 1958 (aged 73)
- Height: 6 ft 5 in (1.96 m)
- Position: Goalkeeper

Senior career*
Years	Team	Apps	(Gls)
- Nottingham Jardines Athletic
1905–1925	Notts County	564	(0)
1926–1927	Lincoln City	35	(0)
Total		599	(0)
- * Club domestic league appearances and goals

Albert Iremonger (15 June 1884 – 9 March 1958) was a football goalkeeper, county-class cricketer and brother of sportsmen Harry Iremonger and James Iremonger.

== Early life ==
Albert Iremonger was born in Wilford, Nottinghamshire on 15 June 1884. He was the younger brother of James Iremonger and older brother of Harry Iremonger.

== Footballing career ==
Although Iremonger never played at an international level, he was widely regarded as one of the best goalkeepers of his time and is a local legend in his home county of Nottinghamshire. It is also believed Iremonger was the tallest player in the league at the time, measuring 6 ft 5in.

=== Notts County ===
Albert Iremonger signed for Notts County from local minnows Notts Jardines, making his debut against Sheffield Wednesday on 1 April 1905. In total he made 564 appearances for the club making 211 consecutive appearances and holds the club record for this. Spending 21 years with the club, he totalled 37 FA Cup appearances over 22 seasons before leaving the club to join Lincoln City.

His exceptional performances for the club earned him a Football League cap in 1912. As a testament to his character and legendary status within the community, a road behind the club's ground was named for him. It is still said amongst Notts County fans that he had "hands like the claws of a JCB".

=== Lincoln City ===
Albert Iremonger signed for Lincoln City aged 42, becoming their oldest ever player. Although he was a short-term signing, he made 35 appearances for the club from 1926 to 1927.

=== Temperament ===
Iremonger was well noted for his outspoken nature on the football pitch, which led to the end of his 211 consecutive appearances for Notts County. He would often leave his goal-mouth to argue decisions made by match officials sometimes situated in the centre of the pitch.

== Cricketing career ==
Iremonger played county cricket for Nottinghamshire, his career spanning between 1906 and 1910. He played with a right-handed batting and bowling style.

== Children ==
Albert Iremonger and his wife Margaret Iremonger fathered Albert Harvey Iremonger in 1920, who went on to become a Sergeant-Pilot in the RAF. He was killed in action on 14 July 1943, aged 23.

== Later life ==
Much later on in his life, during the 1940s, Iremonger was the landlord of the Cremorne in The Meadows Nottingham and later The Ferry Inn Wilford before his death on 9 March 1958.
