= John Deane (sailor) =

English officer of the Navy of the Russian Empire

Captain John Deane
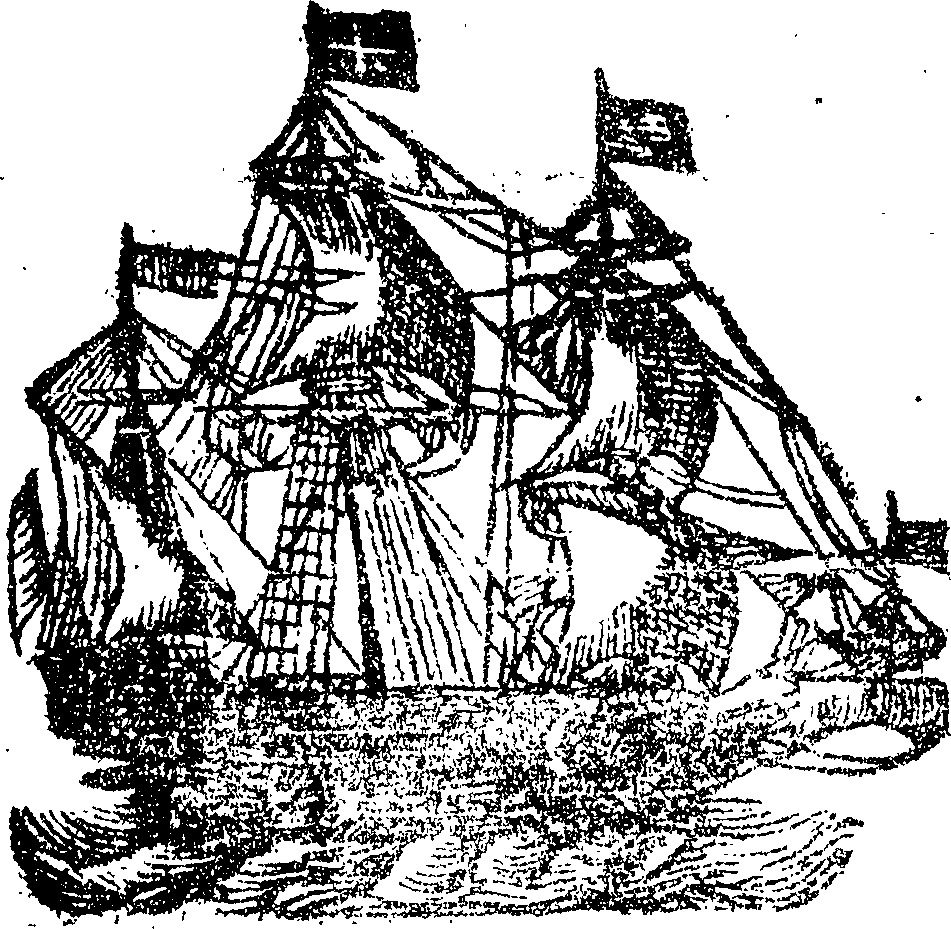
- The Nottingham Galley
- Born: 1679; Nottingham, England
- Died: 1761 (aged 81–82); Wilford, Nottinghamshire, England
- Cause of death: Assault and Robbery
- Resting place: St Wilfrid's Church, Wilford
- Occupations: Royal Navy Captain; Merchant Sailor; Russian Navy Captain; British Consul to the Port of Ostend
- Known for: Capture of Gibraltar; Shipwreck on Boon Island

Captain John Deane (1679 – 1761) was an English sailor with a long career in the Royal Navy and Russian Navy. He rose to the rank of captain in the Royal Navy, commanding in the Capture of Gibraltar. Deane later commanded a trading vessel, the Nottingham Galley, shipwrecked on Boon Island in 1710. Deane spent 1714–1721 in service with the Tsar Peter the Great commanding a Russian naval ship. He then worked in Flanders as British Consul to the Port of Ostend until 1736, when he retired to his native Wilford, Nottingham. He died in 1761 from injuries in a violent assault. His wife died on the next day.

The many accounts of his life include that of William Henry Giles Kingston, who confirms that Deane "really existed", and Richard H. Warner. His shipwreck on Boon Island and suspected cannibalism appear in accounts by W. C. Riess and A. Nightingale.

== Early life ==
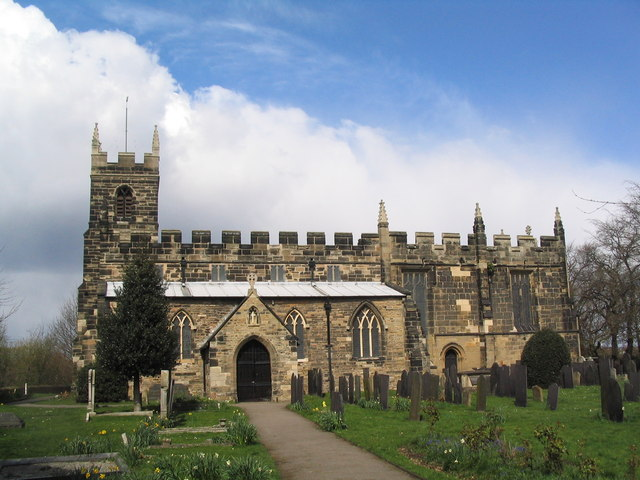
St Wilfrid's Church, Wilford where he was buried

John Deane was born in Nottingham in 1679. His father was Jasper Deane, buried at St Wilfrid's Church, Wilford, where John Deane and his wife were also buried. He had one brother, named Jasper after their father, who accompanied Deane on his later voyages aboard the Nottingham Galley.

Deane's early upbringing was in relative poverty, working as an apprentice to a butcher and drover around Nottingham and London.

During his time as an apprentice, he is said to have "fallen into bad company" and taken to poaching and deer-stealing, which were serious offences in the late 17th century.

== Royal Navy ==
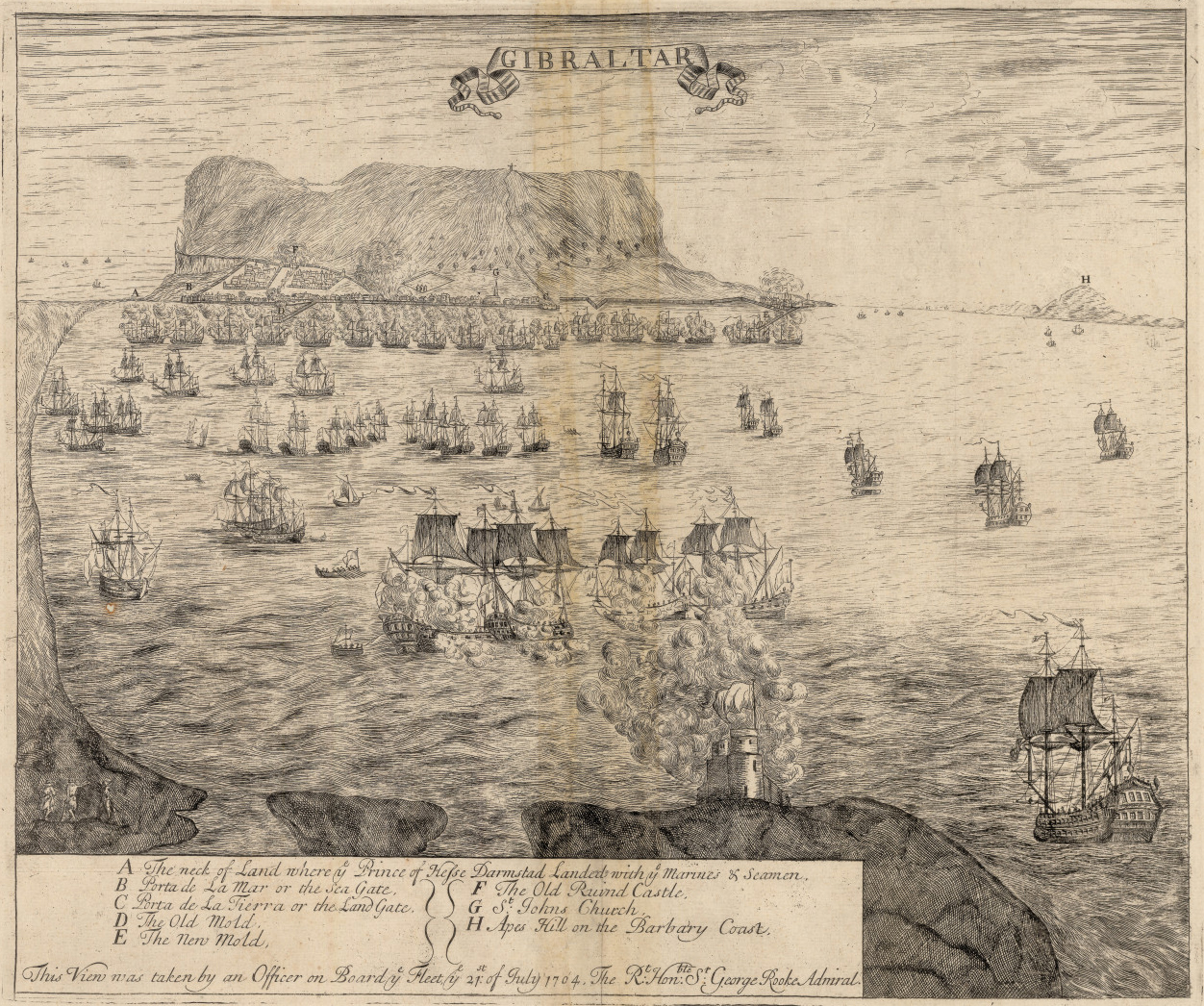
View of Gibraltar taken by an officer of Admiral Sir George Rooke's fleet on 21 July 1704

Deane was described by 19th-century writer W. H. G. Kingston as a Royal Navy officer, who rose to the rank of captain and led in the Capture of Gibraltar at the height of the War of the Spanish Succession before becoming a merchant sailor in about 1709.

Historian R.H. Warner found no evidence in Admiralty documents that Deane was ever an officer in the Royal Navy. He also suggested that Deane was more likely to have served as master's mate than to have been a Captain. Warner recognised that Deane's captaincy of the Nottingham Galley indicates that Deane had acquired the necessary skills to navigate a ship and that he had made prior trans-Atlantic voyages.

== Nottingham Galley and Boon Island ==
With the assistance of his father and brother, in c. 1709 Deane purchased a small merchant galley which he called the Nottingham Galley. In 1710, Deane and his thirteen crew members set sail aboard the Nottingham Galley from London for Boston. Deane's galley encountered severe weather whilst crossing the North-West Atlantic.

At around 9:00 pm on 11 December Deane's ship struck a rock outcrop on Boon Island, approximately eleven kilometres off York, Maine. The entire crew made it ashore on Boon Island, but the cargo and galley were wrecked and lost to the sea.

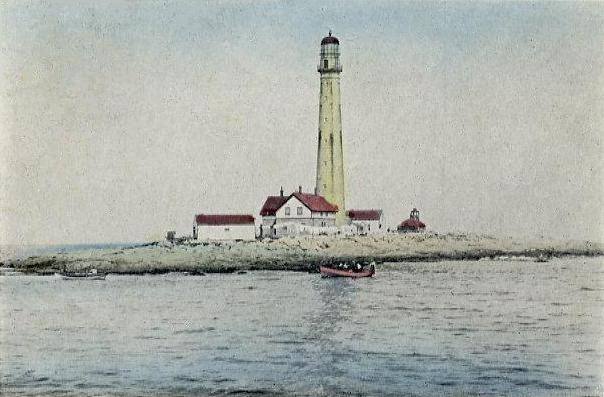
Boon Island Lighthouse c.1900

The crew was marooned without food, shelter or fire. The ship's cook died soon after wrecking on the island, and his body was cast to sea. The carpenter died soon after. The crew decided to cannibalise the dead man in the hope of surviving until being rescued. Deane later wrote of the event that the crew were "reduced to the most deplorable and melancholy circumstances imaginable". Having discussed the legal and moral ramifications of the situation, the crew felt "obliged to submit to [their] craving appetites." Deane disposed of elements of the body that distinguished it as that of a human. Lacking fire, the crew was forced to eat the body raw.

The remaining twelve men survived without fire and with depleted resources for almost two months. In mid-January, the remaining crew attempted to construct a raft from the remaining parts of the ship and sent two men toward land in search of help. Before they had made the distance to shore, the raft was overcome by the sea, with the two men drowning. Residents on the shore nearby found one of the washed-up bodies and sent a team to Boon Island the following day to rescue the remaining survivors.

Before returning to England, some members of the crew, primarily led by his first mate Christopher Langman, signed a deposition and published a narrative of the shipwreck claiming that Deane and his brother, Jasper, had wrecked the ship on purpose in order to claim insurance money. Deane and his brother quickly published a counter-narrative disputing the claims made by the crew members.

== Russian Navy and Peter the Great ==
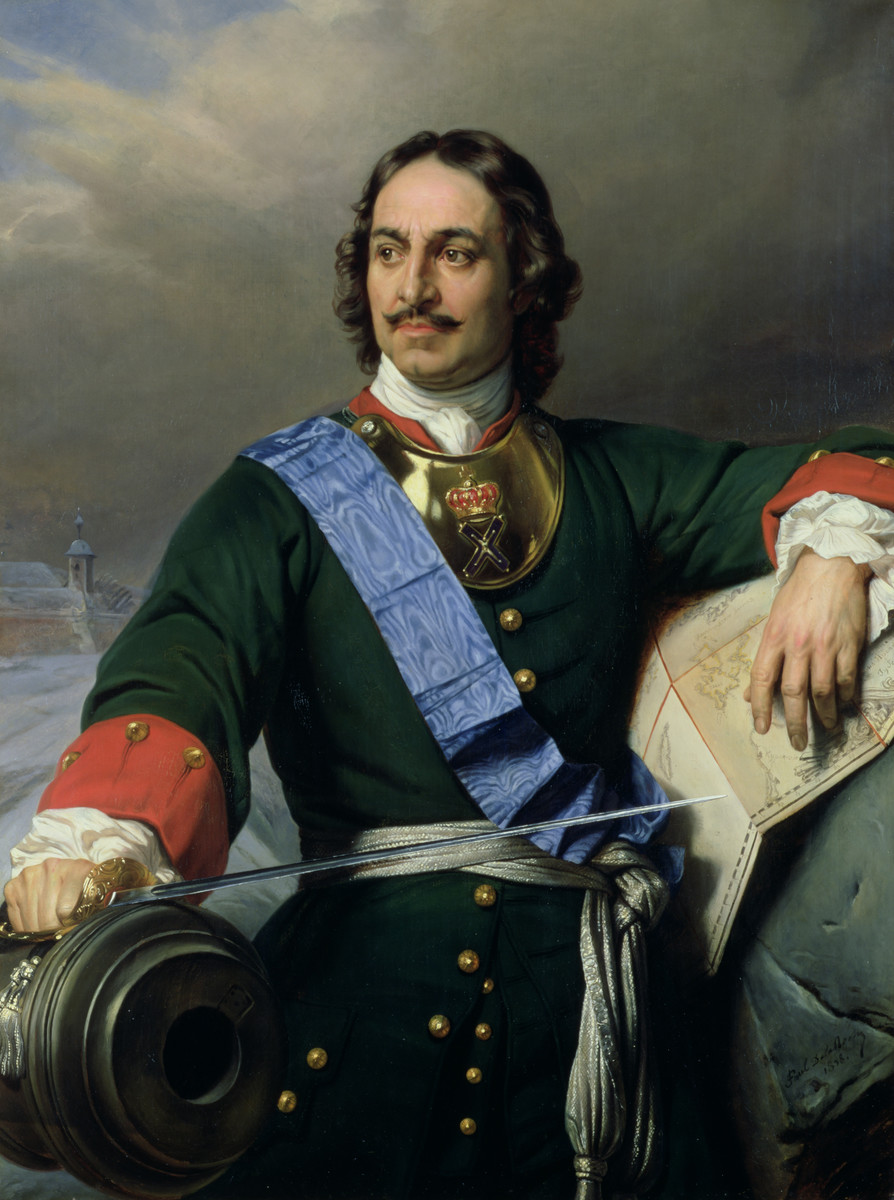
Tsar Peter the Great, 1838

In 1714, Deane took service with the Tsar of Muscovy, Peter the Great in the Russian Navy. In the winter of 1714/15 he took command of the Yagudil, a 50-gun warship. In 1715, Deane was given command of the fifth-rate, 32-gun warship, Samson. Deane was a skilled commander and had successfully conducted over twenty raids on commercial vessels by 1719, gaining the admiration and patronage of Admiral Fyodor Apraksin, who presided over the Russian Admiralty from 1718 and commanded the Baltic Fleet from 1723.

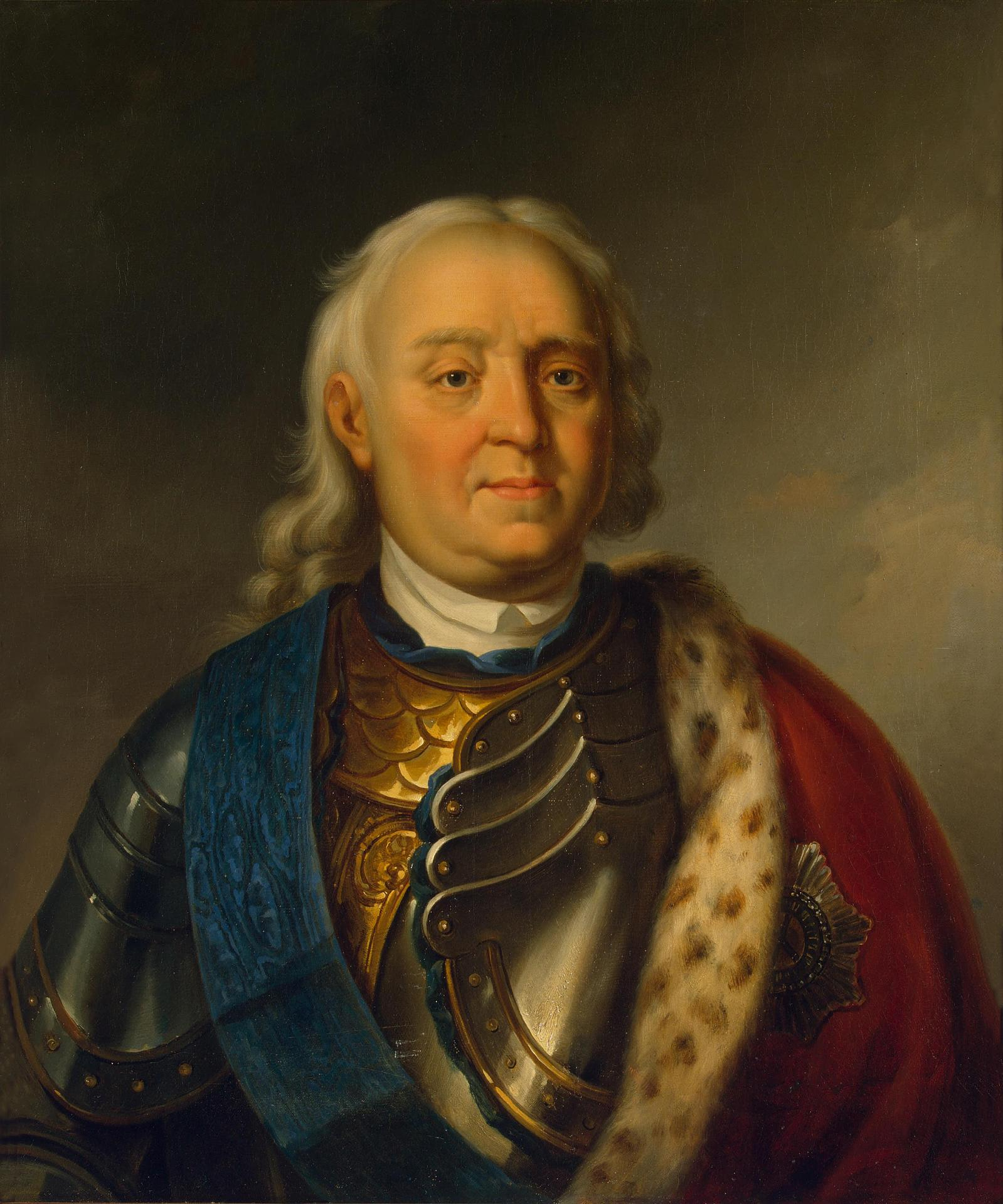
Admiral Fyodor Apraksin

In 1717, the Samson raided two Swedish commercial vessels travelling through the Gulf of Danzig. The successful raid was interrupted by a Royal Navy frigate and a Royal Netherlands Navy man-of-war demanding that Deane relinquish the two vessels. Deane was overpowered and forced to surrender the prizes.

In 1719 Deane was accused of accepting a considerable bribe in exchange for the surrender of the two Swedish vessels. He was soon court-martialled and, although eleven officers and under-officers from his crew testified in support of him, was found guilty and was dismissed from service with a year in prison. The Tsar later reduced the sentence to a demotion to lieutenant and an assignment to transport timber in the remote region of Kazan.

During the trial, Admiral Fyodor Apraksin granted Deane a passport in an attempt to assist him in returning to England. Following the Treaty of Nystadt, ending the Great Northern War in 1721, Deane was dismissed from the Russian Navy and formally expelled from the country with the warning to "never return to Russia". Before his departure from Russia, Apraksin presented Deane with documents describing him as "Captain Deane", permitting Deane to maintain the rank of captain, a title he continued to use until his death. (Note: All materials relating to the incident in the Gulf of Danzig and Captain Deane's trial are located in RGAVMF, fund 1720/60/II/702 Samson Log; RGAVMF, no. 212/1720/60/11. These include: "Testimony of the Officers and Men of the Samson, 8 January 1720", "Reason why I went aboard the Dutch Man-of War", "Admiral Siever's Examination of Captain John Deane", and "The Final Statement of Captain John Deane at his Court Martial, 9 July 1720".)

Deane documented his knowledge of the Russian Navy's tactics and affairs in his 1721 publication A History of the Russian Fleet during the Reign of Peter the Great.

== British diplomat ==
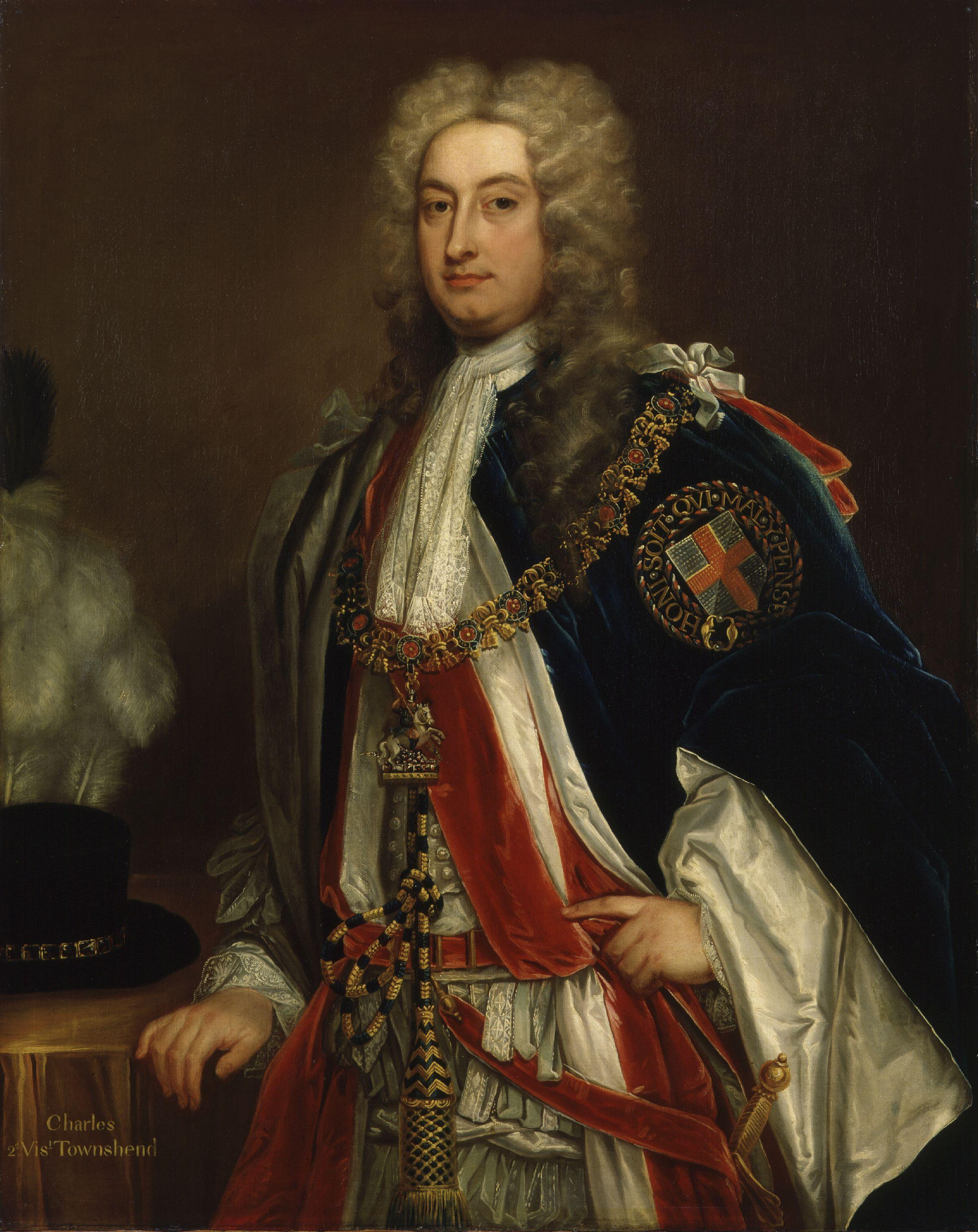
Charles Townshend (1674–1738)

In 1725, following his dismissal from the Russian Navy, Deane was enlisted as consul at St Petersburg. Deane was expelled from Russia seventeen days later. In this time, Deane produced two detailed reports for the British Government. "An Account of Affairs in Russia, June–July 1725," a brief regarding the political fallout following the death of Peter the Great. Deane also produced "The Present State of the Maritime Power of Russia" which gave explicit detail on the Baltic Fleet.

Deane later intercepted a courier for the Jacobites who had been enlisted to deliver classified intelligence to an agent in Rotterdam, detailing Jacobite plans for the coming spring. These actions, in addition to his earlier intelligence reports from St Petersburg, brought Deane to the attention of the British prime minister, Robert Walpole, as well as the secretary of state for the Northern Department, Charles Townshend, 2nd Viscount Townshend.

In 1728 Deane was promoted to British Consul to the Port of Ostend at the request of Townshend.

Deane's work at the Port of Ostend was greatly valued by the British Government with the arrangement of a good annual salary of £200 with expenses. He was noted for his effective suppression of the Ostend Company, the first attempt by the Holy Roman Empire to monopolise trade with the East Indies. Following eight years of service as British Consul in Ostend, Deane retired in 1736 to his home in Wilford, Nottinghamshire.

== Personal life and retirement ==
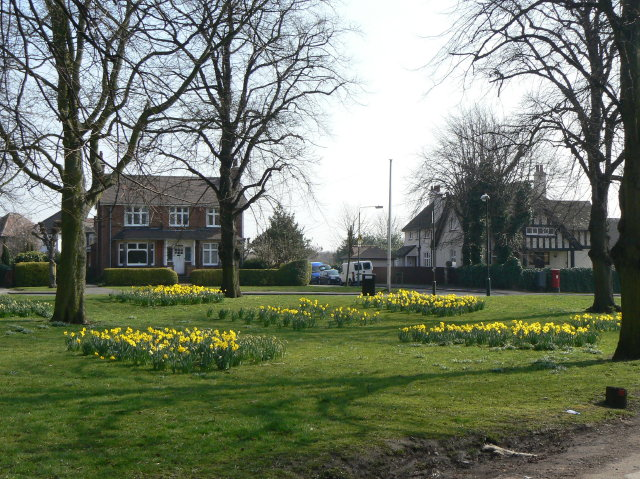
Wilford Village Green

Deane and his wife Sarah, first referenced in correspondence in 1725, had no children.

Following his departure from the Russian Navy in 1725, Deane had constructed two large Georgian houses in the village of Wilford, south of Nottingham. He frequently visited his Wilford home sometimes for several months at a time whilst employed as Consul of the Port of Ostend and retired to there in 1736. As of 2019, the two houses remain overlooking the Village Green.

Deane was enrolled as a freeman of the City of Nottingham in 1744. In 1745 he gave a considerably large contribution to the light horse regiment organized by Evelyn Pierrepont, 2nd Duke of Kingston-upon-Hull, of nearby Holme Pierrepont Hall, in support of the suppression of the Jacobite rising of 1745.

Deane died in 1762 at the age of eighty-three following a violent assault and robbery whilst walking in fields near his house; his assailant was later hanged for his crime. Deane's wife died the following day at the age of eighty-two. They were interred together in the churchyard at St Wilfrid's, Wilford.
