= Harry Iremonger =

English footballer

Personal information
- Full name: Harold Iremonger
- Date of birth: 1894
- Place of birth: Wilford, England
- Date of death: 1957 (aged 62–63)
- Position: Goalkeeper

Senior career*
| Years | Team | Apps | (Gls) |
| 1914–1919 | Nottingham Forest | 10 | (0) |
- * Club domestic league appearances and goals

Harold Iremonger (1894–1957) was an English professional footballer who played as a goalkeeper in the Football League for Nottingham Forest.

== Personal life ==
Iremonger's older brothers James and Albert were also sportsmen. On 16 December 1914, four months after the outbreak of the First World War and the day after the Football Battalion of the Middlesex Regiment was established, Iremonger and Nottingham Forest teammates Tommy Gibson and Joe Mercer travelled down to London to enlist. He served as a private and ended the war in the Royal Air Force.

== Career statistics ==
Appearances and goals by club, season and competition
| Club | Season | League | | | FA Cup | | Total | |
| Club | Season | Division | Apps | Goals | Apps | Goals | Apps | Goals |
|---|---|---|---|---|---|---|---|---|
| Nottingham Forest | 1914–15 | Second Division | 10 | 0 | 0 | 0 | 10 | 0 |
| Career total | | | 10 | 0 | 0 | 0 | 10 | 0 |
