= Boon Island =

Island in the Gulf of Maine

Coordinates: 43°7′15″N 70°28′30″W

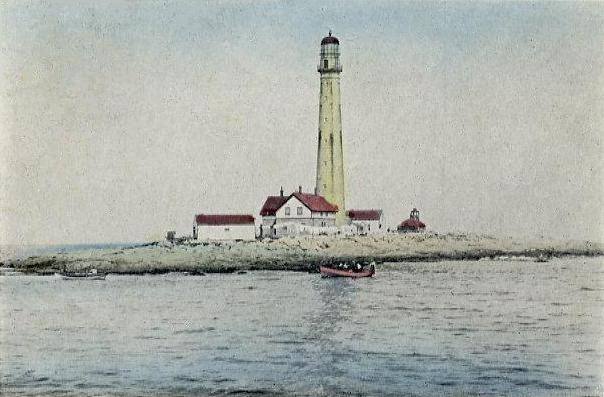
Boon Island Light in 1911

Boon Island is a barren, rocky island in the Gulf of Maine 6 mi (9.7 km) off the coast of York, Maine, United States. The island, which is approximately 300 ft (91 m) by 700 ft (210 m) at low tide, is the site of Boon Island Light, at 137 ft (42 m) high, it is the tallest lighthouse in New England. Numerous vessels have been wrecked on its rocky shoreline. John Winthrop, the English Puritan lawyer and one of the leading figures in founding the Massachusetts Bay Colony, mentions passing Boon Island in the 1600s.

== Boon Island Light ==
A wooden day beacon was erected in 1799 but lasted only five years. Fierce storms repeatedly scour Boon Island, which has an elevation of 14 feet (4.3 m) above sea level at its highest point. Violent seas can heave boulders across its surface, demolishing structures. A stone day beacon was constructed. In 1811, a stone lighthouse was built which stood 32 feet above the water, then rebuilt in 1831 to stand 49 feet. But damage from the elements was relentless. Consequently, in 1854–1855 the tallest lighthouse in New England, Boon Island Light, was built — 133 feet (40 m) of massive granite blocks at a cost of US$25,000. It had a focal plane of 137 feet (42 m). Keepers willing to live in such a desolate place were few, arriving and departing in steady succession. Only one man seemed to thrive there; William C. Williams stayed 27 years and lived past the age of 90.

In 1978, two lightkeepers on the island had to retreat from a powerful winter storm. They took shelter in the light chamber while the seas and wind demolished all other structures on the island. The water rose five feet up the tower and dislodged a number of its segments. The next day, they were rescued by helicopter. The tower was repaired and automated, no longer requiring a resident keeper. It is now powered by solar power.

== Shipwrecks ==
=== Increase (1682) ===
The wrecking of the coastal trading vessel, Increase, in the summer of 1682 is believed to be how the island derived its English name. Four survivors — three Europeans and one native American — subsisted on fish and gulls' eggs. After a month on the island, they built a fire to attract attention when they saw smoke rising from the summit of Mount Agamenticus in York. The people on Mount Agamenticus saw the smoke from the island and the castaways were soon rescued. Seeing their survival as a boon granted by God, the men are said to have dubbed it Boon Island.

However, Celia Thaxter, a 19th-century American writer of poetry and stories, described the ironically named Boon Island as "the forlornest place that can be imagined."

=== Nottingham Galley (1710) ===
More famous was the shipwreck on December 11, 1710, of the British merchant ship, Nottingham Galley, captained by John Deane. All fourteen crewmen aboard survived the initial wreck, however, two died from their injuries – the cook, who died a few days after the initial wreck, and a carpenter, who died two weeks after – and another two drowned attempting to reach the mainland on an improvised raft. The remaining ten crewmen managed to stay alive despite winter conditions with no food and no fire for twenty-four days, until finally rescued. They resorted to cannibalism, eating the carpenter after his death, which gave the incident a notoriety that it retains even today.

The story also features a conflict between the captain and members of his crew, primarily his first mate, Christopher Langman. Langman, backed by two of his crew mates, claimed that Deane turned the ship over to French privateers and then planned to wreck the ship for insurance money. When his crew learned of this, they mutinied and forced Deane to continue to Boston, resulting in its wreck on Boon Island. A vigorous public relations battle ensued in London the following summer between the captain and members of his unhappy crew, which also helped make the story famous in its day. The harrowing story was fictionalized by Kenneth Roberts in his 1956 novel Boon Island. The only non-fiction history of the event, "Boon Island: A True Story of Mutiny, Shipwreck and Cannibalism," by Andrew Vietze and Stephen Erickson, appeared in 2012. It is said that after the Nottingham Galley disaster, local fishermen began leaving barrels of provisions on Boon Island in case of future wrecks.

Speaking of provisions for shipwrecked sailors, just eight miles southwest of Boon Island lie the Isles of Shoals. On Smuttynose Island, a cottage built in the 1950s by Rozamond Thaxter, great-granddaughter of the poet Celia Thaxter, is always open to "mariners in distress of weather". It contains a barrel of provisions for survivors of shipwrecks.

In 1995, Dr. Warren Riess, University of Maine, mounted an expedition to retrieve possible artifacts from the Nottingham Galley. He and his team were successful in the effort, and the items recovered can be viewed at the Maine State Museum.

=== Empire Knight (1944) ===
In February 1944, the Empire Knight, a 428-foot (130 m) British freighter, ran aground at Boon Island and later broke into two sections. The stern section, which included the ship's cargo holds, sank in approximately 260 feet (80 m) of water, one and one half miles (2–3 km) from the Island. In August 1990, the United States Coast Guard became aware of the existence of a plan of stowage dating from 1944 for the ship indicating that 221 flasks (7,620 kg) of mercury may have been loaded onto the vessel. Investigation revealed that such flasks had been placed on the ship but had since deteriorated, releasing the mercury. An estimated 16,000 pounds (7¼ t) of mercury remain unrecovered and it is believed to have settled in the low point of the cargo hold.

== Ownership ==
In May 2000, the U.S. Coast Guard leased Boon Island Lighthouse to the American Lighthouse Foundation (ALF) for the restoration and preservation of the historic light.

In 2014 the lighthouse was sold to real estate developer Art Girard, who subsequently sold it in 2015 to Boon Island LLC.

== See also ==
- List of islands of Maine
