= Boon Island Light =

Lighthouse in Maine, United States

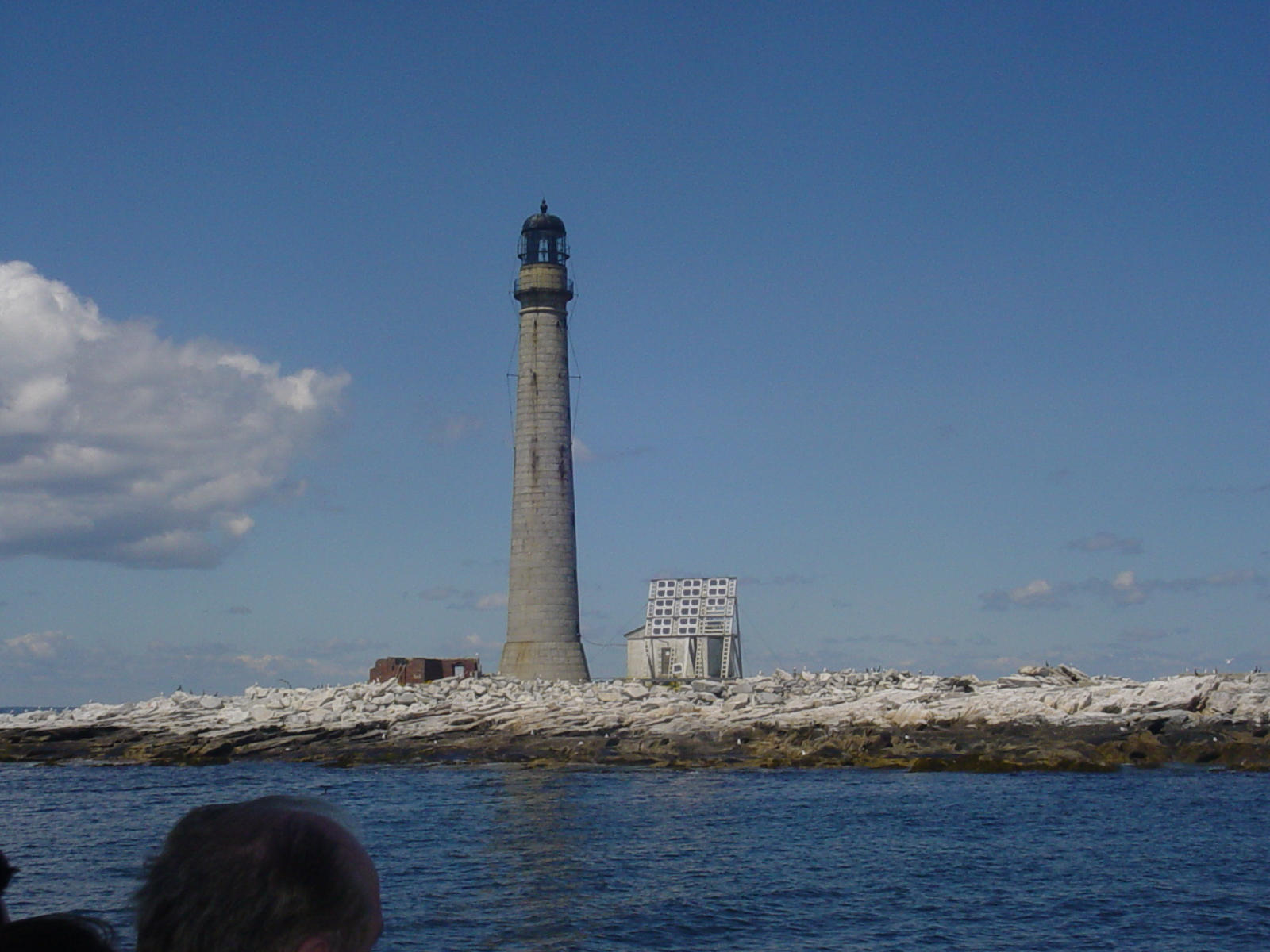
- Location: Boon Island off York beach
- Coordinates: 43°7′17.218″N 70°28′35.119″W

Tower
- Constructed: 1811
- Foundation: Surface rock
- Construction: Granite
- Automated: 1980
- Height: 41 m (135 ft)
- Shape: Gray conical tower connected to building
- Heritage: National Register of Historic Places listed place
- Fog signal: HORN: 1 every 10s

Light
- First lit: 1855 (current tower)
- Focal height: 137 feet (42 m)
- Lens: Second order Fresnel lens (original), VRB-25 (current)
- Range: 19 nautical miles (35 km; 22 mi)
- Characteristic: Flashing white 5s
- Boon Island Light Station
- U.S. National Register of Historic Places
- U.S. Historic district
- Nearest city: York, Maine
- Built: 1855
- Architect: US Army Corps of Engineers
- MPS: Light Stations of Maine MPS
- NRHP reference No.: 88000153
- Added to NRHP: March 14, 1988

Boon Island Light is located on the 300-by-700-foot (91 m × 213 m) Boon Island off the southern coast of Maine, United States, near Cape Neddick. Boon Island Light has the distinction of being the tallest lighthouse in both Maine and New England at 133 feet (41 m). The lighthouse has a focal plane at 137 feet (42 m) above mean high water. The light's beacon flashes white every 5 seconds.

== History ==
Talk of building a lighthouse on Boon Island dates back as early as 1710 when the ship Nottingham Galley ran aground on the barren outcrop that makes up the island. The crew of the Galley were forced to resort to cannibalism before being rescued. In 1799 the first day marker and a 50-foot wooden tower were established on the island, but it was washed away in the first 5 years. A stone day beacon was established in its place. In 1811 the station was converted to a full light station and a granite tower was constructed. This first tower was washed away in a storm in 1832.

The current 133 foot cylindrical brown granite tower was constructed in 1855 and originally had a second order Fresnel lens installed. At the time, it was the tallest lighthouse in New England (base to tip, but not the highest light above sea level). A new keeper's dwelling was also built at this time.

Boon Island Light suffered extensive damage in a blizzard in 1978. Several stones that make up the tower itself were washed into the sea as were all of the keepers dwellings and other outbuildings that had been on the island. As a result, the station was automated in 1980 and a solar powered beacon was installed by the United States Coast Guard. The station is currently active and controlled by the Coast Guard while the lighthouse itself is on lease to the American Lighthouse Foundation. The lighthouse was listed on the National Register of Historic Places as Boon Island Light Station on March 14, 1988, reference number 88000153.

Historical information from Coast Guard web site:

President James Madison authorized the building of Boon Island Lighthouse during the War of 1812. A new lighthouse tower was erected near the old tower in 1855, consisting of a gray granite conical tower, 133 feet above the water, 6.2 nautical miles (11.5 km; 7.1 mi) off the coast of Maine.

As Boon Island is a very flat piece of land, well surrounded by ledges, the tower appears at times to be springing up from the sea from a submerged ledge, especially when low clouds are flying. One of the most isolated stations off the Maine coast, it is also one of the most dangerous.

One story is told of how the keepers were once marooned on the island for several weeks because of storms and rough weather. Their food supplies were low and starvation seemed to be staring them in the face. Just at the point of desperation a boat appeared and they signaled for help. The keeper's message in a bottle was picked up by the passing schooner which hove to and anchored until the sea went down. Then the crew packed some food in a mackerel barrel and set it afloat. It drifted right into a little cove on the island and then the sea caught it and bounced it well up on the bank, out of the way of the surf. The hunger of the keepers was appeased until they were able to go ashore and get supplies at the village of York.

The lighthouse was purchased from the General Services Administration in 2014 for $78,000, by Art Girard, a resident of Portland, Maine. It was subsequently sold to a Boston entity, the current owner (2023)

== Legends and lore ==
During the 19th century a keeper died while on the island leaving his wife alone to tend to the station. She did so until she went insane and was found wandering the island by members of a rescue ship.

== Viewing ==
Boon Island Light is not open to the public. The only way to view the tower is by boat or aircraft.

== Keepers ==
- David Oliver (c. 1811)
- Thomas Hanna (c. 1811–1816)
- Eliphalet Grover (1816–1839)
- Mark Dennet (1840–1841)
- John Thompson (1841–1843)
- Morgan Trafton (1842 assistant keeper, lost in boating accident)
- John Kennard (1843–1846)
- Nathaniel Baker (1849)
- John Thompson (1846–1849)
- Hiram Tobey (1853)
- Caleb S. Gould (1853–1854)
- George Bowden (1854–1855)
- Josiah Tobey Jr. (assistant, 1855)
- Samuel S. Tobey (assistant, 1856)
- Christopher Littlefield (1854)
- Sam Philbrick (1854)
- Charles H. Tobey (assistant 1850, keeper 1856)
- Charles E. Thompson (1858)
- John S. Baker (assistant, 1858)
- Nathaniel Baker (1859)
- William L. Baker (assistant, 1859)

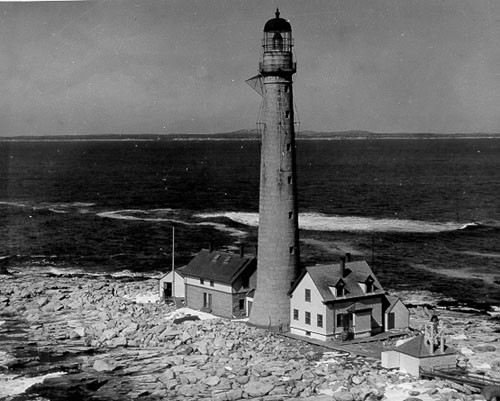
Before the loss of the keeper's house in 1978

- Cabin (?) Gray (1861)
- George B. Wallace (June 1861 – 1866)
- Benjamin Bridges (1861)
- George E. Bridges (1864)
- Richard C. Yeaton (1864)
- Charles Ramsdell (assistant 1865)
- Joshua K. Card (1867–1874)
- George H. Yeaton (assistant 1867)
- Samuel Meloon (assistant, 1868)
- Nathan White Jr. (assistant 1870)
- Alfred J. Leavitt (1874-1886?)
- Leander White (1st assistant, 1874)
- Edwin J. Hobbs (assistant, 1874–1876)
- David R. Grogan (assistant, 1876, keeper 1879)
- George O. Leavitt (assistant, 1878)
- Walter S. Amee (Ames?) (2nd assistant, 1878)
- John Kennard (1884)
- William C. Williams (1st assistant 1885, then keeper 1885–1911)
- James Burke (2nd assistant, 1886–1887, 1st assistant 1887–1890)
- Orrin M. Lamprey (1886)
- Meshach M. Seaward (2nd assistant, 1886–1900)
- Leonidas H. Sawyer (2nd assistant, 1889. keeper 1889)
- Charles W. Allen (2nd assistant, 1907–1911, first assistant 1911-?)
- Mitchell Blackwood (c. 1911)
- Harold Hutchins (c. 1923–1933)
- Fred C. Batty (assistant, c. early 1930s)
- Clinton Dalzell (assistant c. 1934)
- George Woodward (assistant?, c. 1920s)
- C. A. Tracy (c. 1935)
- Hoyt P. Smith (c. 1935)
- E. Stockbridge, assistant (c. 1935)
- Charles U. Gardner (Coast Guard relief keeper, c, 1942–1943)
- John H. Morris (Coast Guard, c. 1945)
- Ted Guice (Coast Guard assistant, c. 1945)
- Kendrick Capon (Coast Guard, c. 1950s)
- Harold L. Roberts (Coast Guard, 1956)
- Leonard John "Moon" Mullen (Coast Guard, c.1956)
- Charles Allen (1st assistant, c. 1957, served 6 years)
- Robert Brann (c. 1958)
- Arthur D. Blackburn (1965–1967)
- Dave Wells (Coast Guard, 1966)
- August "Gus" Pfister (Coast Guard, 1967–1968)
- Thomas Lee (Coast Guard, 1970–1971)
- Bob Roberts (Coast Guard, 1970s)
- Fred Kendall (1973–1975)

== See also ==
- National Register of Historic Places listings in York County, Maine
