= James Iremonger =

English cricketer

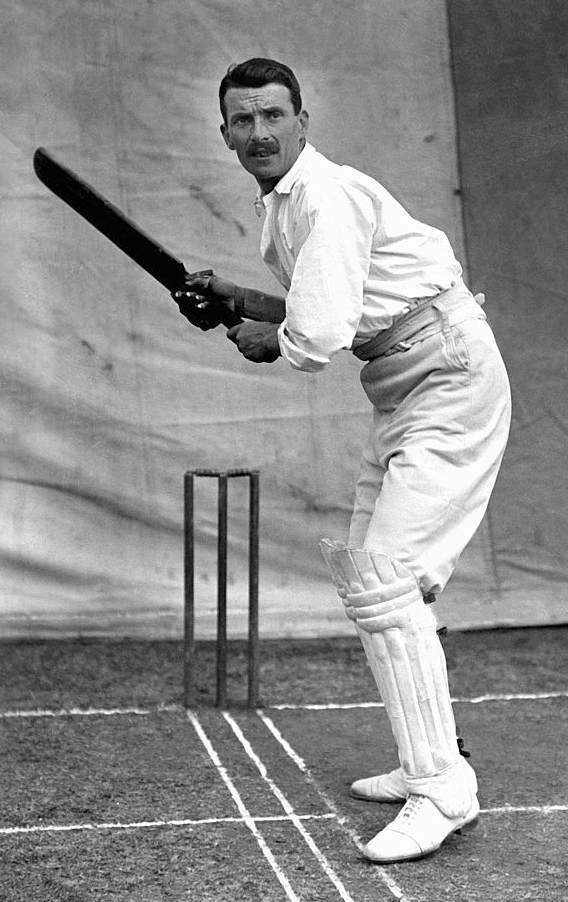
- Iremonger circa 1905

Personal information
- Born: 5 March 1876; Norton, East Riding of Yorkshire, England
- Died: 25 March 1956 (aged 80); Nottingham, England
- Batting: Right-handed
- Bowling: Right-arm medium

Career statistics
Competition	First-class
Matches	334
Runs scored	16,622
Batting average	35.06
100s/50s	31/82
Top score	272
Balls bowled	38,693
Wickets	619
Bowling average	22.98
5 wickets in innings	35
10 wickets in match	8
Best bowling	8/21
Catches/stumpings	190/–
- Source: CricketArchive, 6 November 2022
Association football career
- Position: Full back
Senior career*
Years	Team	Apps	(Gls)
1893	Wilford		
1894	Nottingham Jardines Athletic		
1895–1910	Nottingham Forest	276	(2)
Total		276	(2)
International career
1901–1902	England	2	(0)
- * Club domestic league appearances and goals

James Iremonger (5 March 1876 – 25 March 1956) was an English cricketer and one of the players most unlucky never to play Test cricket. He did play a number of minor matches on the 1911–12 Ashes tour and was considered many times between 1901 and 1905 for a place against Australia.

== Biography ==
Born 5 March 1876, Norton, East Riding of Yorkshire, England, Iremonger played 334 first-class matches for Nottinghamshire between 1899 and 1914, scoring 16,622 runs at 35.06 and taking 619 wickets with his right-arm medium-pace at 22.98. He was a Wisden Cricketer of the Year in 1903.

Iremonger had had a trial in the then-annual "Colts" match (whereby a team of twenty potential first-class cricketers played an odds match against the senior Nottinghamshire team) in 1897. It was though he had the potential to strengthen Nottinghamshire's dreadfully weak bowling, so that the county engaged him as a bowler in 1899 and he played in five matches for the first eleven. However, he took only five wickets and never more than one in an innings. It was thought he had the accuracy and the strong physique at over 90 kilograms (14 st) to succeed but lacked any spin whatsoever and thus could never beat even ordinary batsmen.

However, the following year his solid defence saw Iremonger establish himself in the first team as a batsman, but he was routinely criticised for lacking strokes and his figures with an average of only around 18 bore this out. It was thus a surprise when Iremonger jumped in the rank of batsmen in August 1901 with four centuries in successive matches and an average of 44.

For the following five years, Iremonger was one of the best batsmen in England, forming with Arthur Jones one of the best opening partnerships in the game. His exceptionally strong and watchful defence made him a very hard man to get out and he had developed a good range of strokes on the off-side – though his rather stiff style made him less than graceful to most spectators watching him. This first stage of Iremonger's career reached its peak in 1904 when he made 1,983 runs with an average above 60, including his highest score of 272 against Kent. 1907, despite Nottinghamshire winning the Championship, saw Iremonger decline badly as a batsman. He achieved a batting average of above 30 only once in the seven seasons from 1907 to 1913 and dropped down the order from 1910. Nevertheless, Iremonger always remained an extremely useful and obdurate bat in any crisis, and even in the wet summer of 1912 where he only once exceeded fifty, eight not outs gave him an average of 26.

However, from 1908, with John Gunn and Hallam declining rapidly as bowlers, Iremonger surprisingly filled the breach in the county's attack. Although he had not infrequently been tried as a change bowler, Iremonger did not take five wickets in an innings until 1908, yet at the end of that year he had taken 57 wickets and headed the Nottinghamshire bowling averages. By 1910 his developing break-back and accuracy of length made him deadly on a worn or sticky wicket. The exceptional summer of 1911, though it was thought batsmen "did not find him difficult", saw Iremonger's nagging perseverance on the hardest of pitches rated so highly that he was taken to Australia for bowling alone. He did little and was never considered for the 1912 Triangular Tournament despite maintaining his form.

His last season of 1914 saw Iremonger frequently captain Nottinghamshire in the absence of any available amateur to carry out the job, and he regained some of the batting form of ten years before. His most notable feat, however, was bowling 66 consecutive overs unchanged against Hampshire at Southampton. This is an all-time record for most overs bowled by any bowler unchanged. When county cricket resumed after the war, Iremonger did not resume his first-class career, but he did play one match for Notts' Second XI in 1927, when he was 51 years old. He coached Nottinghamshire from 1921 to 1938, when he retired.

Iremonger also played football for Nottingham Forest making his debut as a fullback in 1896 against Stoke and earned 2 caps for England. He spent fifteen years with Forest making over 300 appearances.

He is mentioned in James Joyce's Ulysses in the cabman shelter.

Iremonger lived to the age of 80, and was living in Nottingham at the time of his death on 25 March 1956.

== Family ==
James's brother Albert Iremonger, the Notts County goalkeeper, also played first-class cricket for Nottinghamshire. His other brother, Harry, also played football for Nottingham Forest.

Iremonger's son, James, was born in 1901 and played one game as a goalkeeper for Hull City A.F.C. in December 1924. He died in 1980.
