= Wilford Power Station =

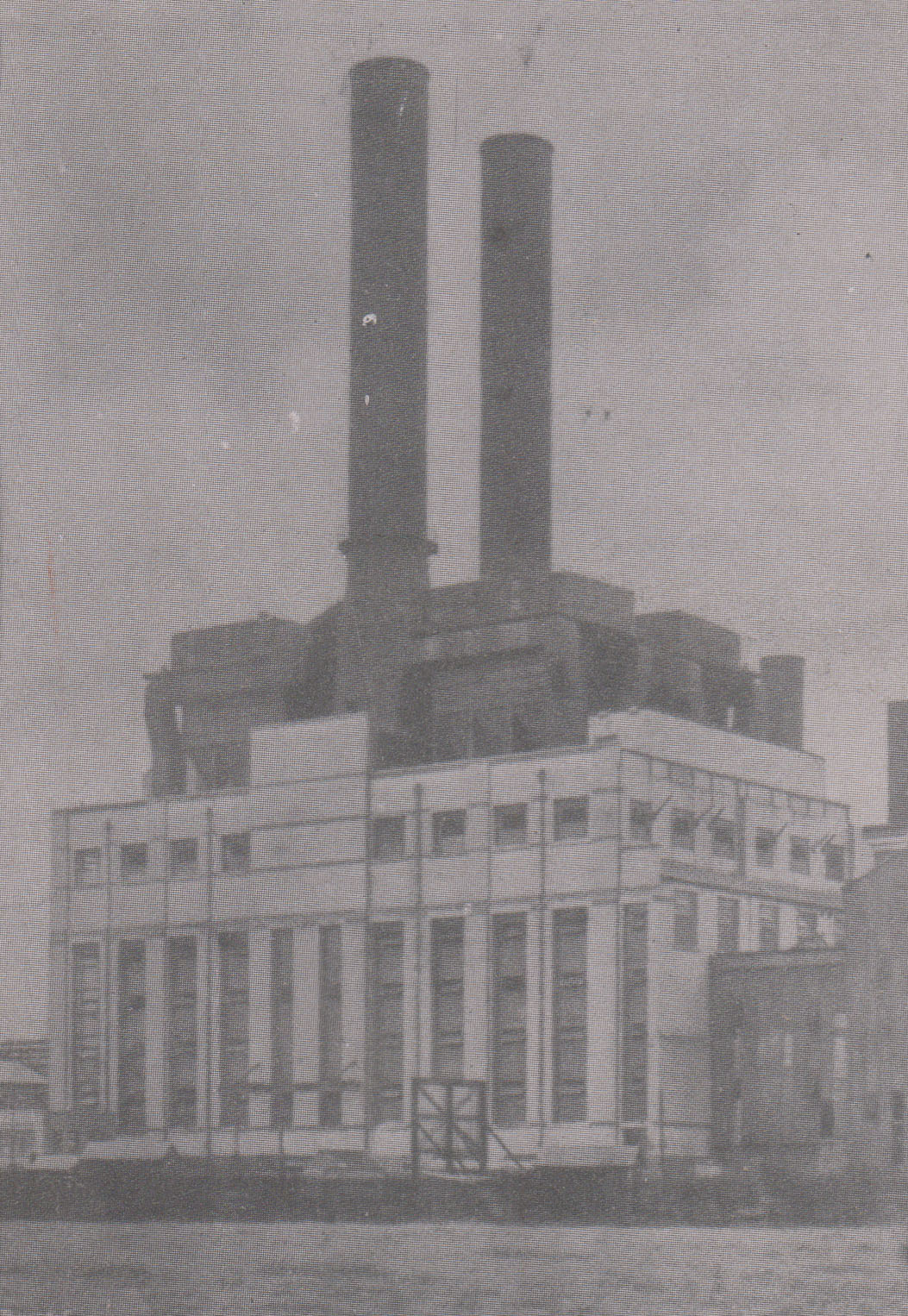
- North Wilford Power Station, February 1940
- Country: England
- Location: Nottinghamshire, East Midlands
- Coordinates: 52.931980°N 1.166837°W
- Status: Decommissioned and demolished
- Construction began: 1921
- Commission date: September 1925
- Decommission date: 1981
- Construction cost: £700,000 (1925), £1,050,000 (1928)
- Owners: Nottingham Corporation (1920–1948); British Electricity Authority (1948–1955); Central Electricity Authority (1955–1957); Central Electricity Generating Board (1958–1981)
- Operator: As owner

Thermal power station
- Primary fuel: Coal
- Turbine technology: Steam turbines
- Chimneys: 4 + 2 (1947) + 2 (1957)
- Cooling towers: none
- Cooling source: River water

Power generation
- Units operational: 3 × 10,000 kW + 1 × 1,000 kW (1925), 3 × 30 MW + 1 × 52.5 MW + 1 × 53 MW + 1 × 62 MW (1971)
- Units decommissioned: All
- Nameplate capacity: 31 MW (1928), 308.5 MW (1971)
- Annual net output: 625.46 GWh (1971)

External links
- Commons: Related media on Commons

Wilford power station was a coal-fired electricity generating station situated on the north bank of the River Trent, at Nottingham in the East Midlands.

It was also known as North Wilford power station and Nottingham power station

== History ==
Nottingham Corporation obtained a provisional order from the Board of Trade, the Nottingham Electric Lighting Order 1890 to generate and supply electricity which was first supplied in September 1894. In 1897 the plant had a generating capacity of 957 kW and the maximum load was 580 kW. A total of 480.381 MWh of electricity was sold to 482 customers which powered 38,000 lamps plus 9 public lamps. This provided an income to the corporation of £10,740-13-2.

In 1898 the plant consisted of

- 3 x 80HP Willans engines driving Siemens 48 kW dynamos
- 4 x Willans engines driving Siemens 80 kW dynamos
- 2 x Willans engines driving Siemens 220 kW dynamos

fed by steam from six Lancashire boilers.

By 1923 Nottingham Corporation operated three electricity generating stations:

- Talbot Street, with an electrical rating of 4,106 kW,
- Eastcroft (refuse) destructor, electrical rating 441 kW,
- St. Anne's, electrical rating 6,040 kW.

In addition the partly built Wilford power station had two 2,000 kW turbo-alternators available.

These stations generated a total of 23.641 GWh of electricity in 1923. This was used for lighting and domestic supplies, public lighting, traction and power. The annual revenue from sales of electricity was £263,557, and the surplus of revenue in excess of expenses was £117,210.

By 1920 Nottingham Corporation wished to develop its electricity supply and planned Wilford power station to use coal from the nearby Clifton mine.

== Construction ==
Wilford power station was authorised in 1920. In September 1921 tenders were invited by the Nottingham Corporation for three 10,000 kW turbo-alternators and one 1,000 kW combined turbo-generator-alternator. And for six water-tube boilers with mechanical stokers, super-heaters and forced draught fans.

Construction took 5 years, cost £700,000 (equivalent to £36,790,000 in 2025) and the first 30 MW section was completed and formally opened on 17 September 1925.

== Operations ==
The new station was opened on 17 September 1925 by Sir John Snell the Chairman of the Electricity Commissioners. By 1928 further plant had been commissioned. On 7 November 1928 Sir Andrew Duncan the Chairman of the Central Electricity Board inaugurated a new 20,000 kW set at the North Wilford station. The station then had a continuous rating of 58.5 MW and a maximum rating of 71 MW. The total cost of the station was then £1,050,000. The Electricity Commissioners scheduled Wilford as a ‘selected’ station.

In October 1936 a further BTH 30,000 kW turbo alternator was commissioned along with four new 200,000 lb/hr boilers.

Much of the coal came from nearby Clifton Colliery immediately north of the power station, there were also railway connections to the Nottingham branch of the Midland Main Line and the Great Central Railway. The power station provided power for Nottingham and the local surrounding area.

The cooling water system abstracted and returned up to 45,500 m^{3}/h (10 million gallons per hour) of water from the River Trent.

Upon nationalisation of the British electricity supply industry in 1948 the ownership of Wilford power station was vested in the British Electricity Authority, and subsequently the Central Electricity Authority and the Central Electricity Generating Board (CEGB). Responsibility for the local distribution and sale of electricity was transferred to the East Midlands Electricity Board.

In February 1947 a new low pressure station was commissioned to the south of the existing station. This comprised four 40 kg/s steam boilers operating at 41.4 bar and 454 °C. These supplied two 30 MW, a single 53 MW and a single 52.5 MW turbo-alternators. This gave a net electricity generating capability of 118 MW.

In May 1957 a new high pressure station was commissioned. This comprised two 38 kg/s steam boilers operating at 62.06 bar and 482 °C. There was a single 62 MW turbo-alternator (commissioned in May 1957). This gave a net electricity generating capability of 58 MW.

In 1971 Wilford power station comprised the following plant. Pulverised fuel boilers with a total capacity of 3,180,000 kg per hour of steam. There was a range of steam conditions – 250/600/900 psi (17.2/41.4/62.1 bar) and 354/427/454/482 °C. The installed capacity of the generators was 308.5 MW comprising three 30 MW, one 52.5 MW, one 53 MW and one 62 MW turbo-alternators. The total electricity output that year was 625.459 GWh. The thermal efficiency of the station was 21.02%.

The electricity output of the station was:

Electricity output of Wilford power station
Year	Output (GWh)
Low Pressure station
1946	350
1953/4	1366.24
1954/5	1243.10
1955/6	1324.70
1956/7	894.17
1957/8	779.43
High Pressure station
1957/8	86.80
Total output
1960/1	1200.7
1961/2	1056.0
1962/3	1061.8
1966/7	1147.75
1972	625.46
1978-9	269.7

=== Summary of installed plant ===
The boilers and electrical plant installed in Wilford power station is summarised as follows.

Wilford power station plant and equipment
Construction/operational phase	Boilers			Generators		
Construction/operational phase	No. and Manufacturer	Capacity (1,000 lb/h)	Steam conditions (psi and °F)	No. and Capacity	Speed (rpm)	Manufacturer
First Section (1925) and Extension (1928)	2 × Belliss and Morcom	600 (total)	–	3 × 12.5 MW 1 × 20 MW	1,500	British Thomson-Houston
First Section (1925) and Extension (1928)	1 × Hopkinson	300	–	3 × 12.5 MW 1 × 20 MW	1,500	British Thomson-Houston
Second Section (1935)	4 × International Combustion	150	625 psi and 800/850 °F	1 × 30 MW	3,000	British Thomson-Houston
Third Section (1947)	4 × International Combustion	175	625 psi and 860 °F	2 × 30 MV	3,000	British Thomson-Houston
Fourth Section (1949–50)	4 × International Combustion	320	625 psi and 860 °F	1 × 53 MW 1 × 52.5 (plus 2 × 2.5 MW house service)	3,000	British Thomson-Houston
HP Extension (1957)	2 × Mitchell Engineering	300	950 psi and 925 °F	1 × 60 MW		Metropolitan-Vickers

== Flue gas treatment ==
Wilford power station was the site of an experimental plant to remove sulphur compounds from the flue gases. A pilot plant was installed in 1957, at a cost of £220,000, to treat 56,000 ft^{3}/min (1586 m^{3}/min) of boiler flue gases using a cyclic ammonia process. A solution of ammonium salts was re-circulated over a packing through which the flue gases rise. Sulphur compounds in the gases reacted with the solution to form ammonium sulphite, bisulphite and thiosulphate. The ammonia solution was treated with sulphuric acid then further processed to yield 11 tonnes of ammonium sulphate per day and 2,000 lb/day (908 kg/day) of sulphur. The plant was shut down in 1959 because of the difficulty of obtaining ammonia, the impurities in the product and objectionable odours in the gas plume.

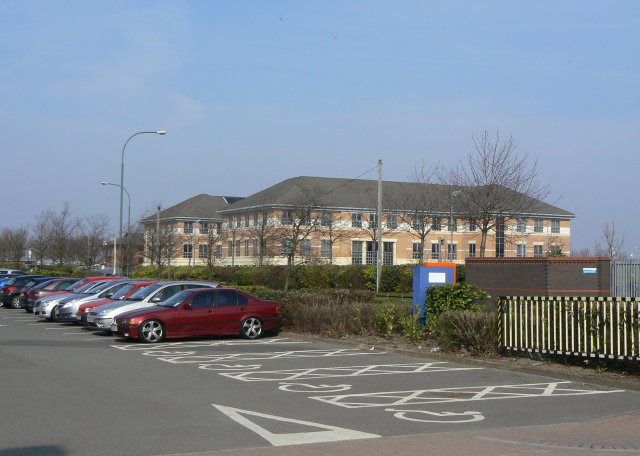
Embankment House

== Demolition and redevelopment ==
Wilford power station closed in 1981 and was demolished shortly afterwards. Much of the area was redeveloped with the neighbouring clay works and railway terminus demolished around the same time.

In 1991, the city council announced plans to build a new stadium for Nottingham Forest FC on the site, but these plans were abandoned in favour of modernising the City Ground.

The Nottingham 132 kV electricity substation is still on the site. This is fed from Ratcliffe-on-Soar power station and supplies electricity to Nottingham.

The former power station site has since been developed as a commercial site and is now called the Riverside Retail Park with multiple stores including the anchor stores of B&Q, Boots UK and Argos. The site also contains the Riverside Park and Ride for NCT and Trent Barton.

Additional land was filled in for parkland and developed for offices, including Embankment House and Riverleen House office blocks which used to be the headquarters of Experian.

== See also ==
- List of power stations in England
