= American Lighthouse Foundation =

Coordinates: 44°06′21″N 69°06′34″W

The American Lighthouse Foundation (ALF) is a 501(c)(3) non-profit organization founded in 1994 with a primary mission of lighthouse preservation. ALF's main office and storefront are headquartered in Rockland, Maine, and the organization currently has thirteen chapters that have stewardship responsibility over the following twenty-two lighthouses in Connecticut, Maine, Massachusetts, New Hampshire, and Rhode Island:

Name	State
Avery Point Light	Connecticut
Boon Island Light	Maine
Cape Elizabeth Light	Maine
Dutch Island Light	Rhode Island
Eastern Point Light	Massachusetts
Halfway Rock Light	Maine
Little River Light	Maine
Long Point Light	Massachusetts
Owls Head Light	Maine
New London Ledge Light	Connecticut
Newport Harbor Light (Goat Island)	Rhode Island
Pemaquid Point Light	Maine
Perkins Island Light	Maine
Pomham Rocks Light	Rhode Island
Portsmouth Harbor Light	New Hampshire
Prospect Harbor Point Light	Maine
Race Point Light	Massachusetts
Rockland Harbor Breakwater Light	Maine
Sandy Neck Light	Massachusetts
Whaleback Light	Maine
Wood End Light	Massachusetts
Wood Island Light	Maine
