= Halfway Rock Light =

Lighthouse in Maine, US

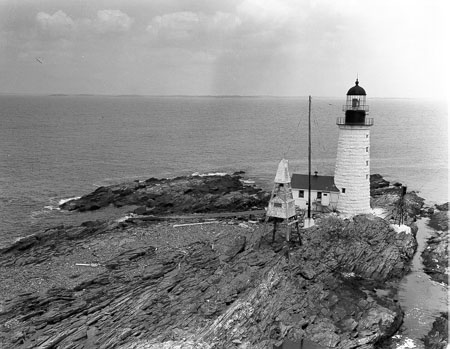
- Undated US Coast Guard photo
- Location: Casco bay off Bailey island
- Coordinates: 43°39′20.8″N 70°2′12.426″W

Tower
- Constructed: 1871
- Foundation: Granite
- Construction: Granite
- Automated: 1975
- Height: 23 m (75 ft)
- Shape: Conical
- Markings: White with black lantern
- Heritage: National Register of Historic Places listed place
- Fog signal: HORN: 2 every 30s operates continuously

Light
- First lit: 1871
- Focal height: 76 feet (23 m)
- Lens: 3rd order Fresnel lens (1871), VRB-25 (1994)
- Range: 19 nautical miles (35 km; 22 mi)
- Characteristic: Fl R 5s
- Halfway Rock Light Station
- U.S. National Register of Historic Places
- Nearest city: South Harpswell, Maine
- Architect: US Army Corps of Engineers
- MPS: Light Stations of Maine MPS
- NRHP reference No.: 88000150
- Added to NRHP: March 14, 1988

Halfway Rock Lighthouse is a lighthouse located on a barren ledge in Casco Bay, Maine. The lighthouse tower, which has a height of 76 feet (23 m), and the attached ex-boathouse are all that remains, as the other buildings have been taken away in storms. The name "Halfway Rock" comes from the position of the rock which is halfway between Cape Elizabeth and Cape Small, the southwest and northeast extremities of Casco Bay, which are about 18 nautical miles (33 km) apart.

Halfway Rock Light was added to the National Register of Historic Places as Halfway Rock Light Station on March 14, 1988.

Halfway Rock Light Station was purchased in 2014 by a private individual, Ford Reiche, per DIY Network's Building Off the Grid program that shows the reclamation and restoration of the property.

== History ==
The need for a lighthouse on Halfway Rock first came to attention when, in the year 1835, a ship called Samuel ran aground on the rock during a storm. Because the ledge is only ten feet above high tide on a calm day, it becomes hard to see during storms. The cry for a lighthouse was ignored in Washington until, again, in 1861, a ship ran aground on Halfway Rock. This time, it was taken a bit more seriously. Construction began, but was delayed time and time again due to lack of supplies and lack of workmen. Ten years later, in 1871, the first light shone from Halfway Rock, as a new light had been completed. The keepers' quarters were originally inside the lighthouse tower. An 1888 boathouse contained additional living space for the keepers in its upper story.

The light was originally produced by a third-order Fresnel lens. Its characteristic was fixed white punctuated by a red flash once every minute. A fog bell was brought to the rock in 1887. It had a bit of success, but as technology kept coming out with new innovations, the bell was replaced with a fog "trumpet" in 1905. Since this was a difficult lighthouse station to reach, in the mid-1930s, the Coast Guard began bringing a tender to bring the men onto the mainland and back out to the rock. In addition to this, there was a helicopter landing pad in case of emergency. The light was automated in 1975 and the keepers were removed. The marine railway was destroyed by the 1991 Perfect Storm. The old Fresnel lens is now at the museum at the U.S. Coast Guard Academy in New London, CT; the active optic is a VRB-25. The attached wood building was badly damaged by storms in 2007. The lighthouse was licensed to the American Lighthouse Foundation, and the organization raised funds for its restoration.

The Halfway Rock Light was sold at auction for $283,000 in September 2014. The historic building restoration was the subject of a 2017 episode of Building Off the Grid.

== See also ==
- National Register of Historic Places listings in Cumberland County, Maine
