= Highland House (Truro, Massachusetts) =

Historic house in Massachusetts, United States

- U.S. National Register of Historic Places
- U.S. Historic district – Contributing property
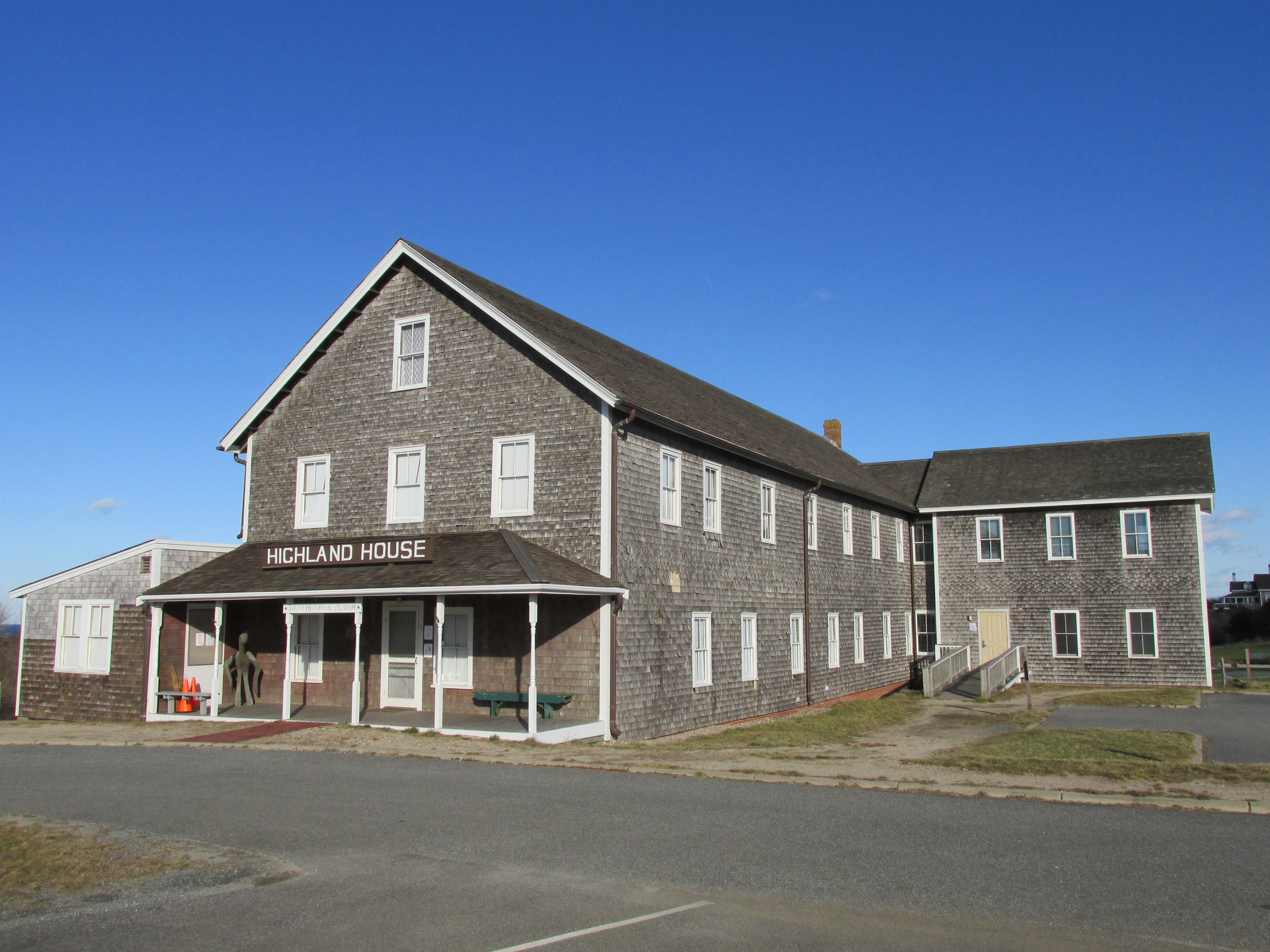
- Highland House

- Location within Cape Cod
- Location: Truro, Massachusetts
- Coordinates: 42°2′25″N 70°3′56″W
- Built: 1907
- Architects: Small, Isaac M.
- Architectural style: Colonial
- Part of: Truro Highlands Historic District (ID11000823)
- NRHP reference No.: 75000157

Significant dates
- Added to NRHP: June 5, 1975
- Designated CP: November 22, 2011

The Highland House is a historic hotel building, now serving as a museum, located at 6 Highland Light Road within the Cape Cod National Seashore in Truro, Massachusetts. It is located in the Cape Cod National Seashore near the Highland Light in the Truro Highlands Historic District. The present two-story wood-frame building was constructed in 1907 by Isaac Small, whose family had been serving tourists in the area (among them Henry David Thoreau) since 1835.

The building was listed on the National Register of Historic Places in 1975. It is now known as Highland House Museum and is operated by the Truro Historical Society as a museum of local history.

== See also ==
- National Register of Historic Places listings in Cape Cod National Seashore
- National Register of Historic Places listings in Barnstable County, Massachusetts
