= List of shipwrecks in September 1821 =

The list of shipwrecks in September 1821 includes ships sunk, wrecked, or otherwise lost during September 1821.

== 1 September ==
List of shipwrecks: 1 September 1821
Ship	State	Description
Caroline	United States	The sloop sank in a hurricane at New York.
John	(United Kingdom of Great Britain and Ireland) Nevis	The sloop was driven ashore at Guadeloupe.
Lady Georgiana	United Kingdom	The ship was lost in Carlisle Bay, Barbados.
Leopard	United States	The sloop was wrecked in a hurricane at New York.
Mercurius	Stettin	The ship was sighted in the Øresund whilst on a voyage from Stettin to Málaga, Spain. No further trace, presumed foundered with the loss of all hands.
Surrey	United Kingdom	The ship was abandoned in the Atlantic Ocean. Her crew were rescued by Enterprise (United Kingdom). She was on a voyage from Halifax, Nova Scotia, British North America to Jamaica.

== 2 September ==
List of shipwrecks: 2 September 1821
Ship	State	Description
Ann	United Kingdom	The ship was driven ashore and wrecked in the Bay of Santa Rosa, near Montevideo, Brazil with the loss of a crew member. She was on a voyage from Gibraltar to Rio de Janeiro, Brazil.
Clyde	United Kingdom	The ship was lost at near Maldonado, Brazil with the loss of a crew member. She was on a voyage from Liverpool, Lancashire to Buenos Aires, Argentina.
Josephine	France	The ship was lost at Montevideo.
Rebecca	United Kingdom	The ship departed from Trinidad for Gibraltar. No further trace, presumed foundered with the loss of all hands.

== 3 September ==
List of shipwrecks: 3 September 1821
Ship	State	Description
Blake	United States	The schooner capsized in the Atlantic Ocean with the loss of all but one of the nine people on board. The survivor and the ship's dog were rescued on 5 September by Rising Sun (United States). She was on a voyage from Portland, Maine to Charleston, South Carolina.
Charles Miller	United States	The ship was wrecked at Portland, Maine.
Conductor	United States	The schooner was driven ashore and wrecked in a hurricane at Rockaway Beach, Queens, New York with the loss of all hands.
Connecticut	United States	The steamship was driven ashore in a hurricane at New Haven, Connecticut.
Eliza	United States	The schooner was wrecked in a hurricane at Jersey City, New Jersey.
Elliot	United States	The schooner was wrecked in a hurricane off Rockaway Beach.
Enterprize	United States	The schooner was wrecked in a hurricane at Jersey City.
Glory Ann	United States	The schooner was driven ashore and wrecked in a hurricane at Rockaway Beach with the loss of all crew but her captain.
Huddart	United Kingdom	The ship was driven ashore and wrecked near Wolfe's Cove, Lower Canada, British North America. She was on a voyage from Quebec City, Lower Canada to London.
Rosomond	United States	The schooner was wrecked in a hurricane at Jersey City.
Stephen	United States	The sloop was driven ashore in a hurricane at Jersey City.
Superior	United States	The schooner was driven ashore and wrecked in a hurricane at Rockaway Beach with the loss of all hands.
Susan	United States	The ship was driven ashore in a hurricane at the Black Rock Harbor Lighthouse, Bridgeport, Connecticut. She was refloated on the next high tide.
Traveller	United States	The sloop was driven ashore in a hurricane at the Black Rock Harbor Lighthouse. She was refloated on the next high tide.
Two Catharines	United States	The ship foundered in the Atlantic Ocean off the Dutch Island Lighthouse, Rhode Island. She was on a voyage from "Ivica" to Providence, Rhode Island.
Underhill	United States	The brig was driven ashore in a hurricane at East Guilford, Connecticut.
Vulcan	United States	The full-rigged ship was driven ashore in a hurricane at Jersey City.
William	United Kingdom	The ship was wrecked on the Tuckernuck Shoals, off Tuckernuck Island, Massachusetts, United States. She was on a voyage from Jamaica to Halifax, Nova Scotia, British North America.
Winyaw	United States	The schooner was driven ashore and wrecked in a hurricane at New Rochelle, New York. Her crew were rescued.

== 4 September ==
List of shipwrecks: 4 September 1821
Ship	State	Description
Huddart	United Kingdom	The ship was wrecked at Wolf Cove, Newfoundland, British North America. She was on a voyage from Quebec, British North America to London.

== 5 September ==
List of shipwrecks: 5 September 1821
Ship	State	Description
Four Sons	United Kingdom	The ship was wrecked near Stranraer, Wigtownshire. Her crew were rescued.

== 6 September ==
List of shipwrecks: 6 September 1821
Ship	State	Description
Duke of Wellington	United Kingdom	The ship was driven ashore at Rio Real, Brazil. She was on a voyage from Liverpool, Lancashire to Bahia, Brazil.
Earl of Dalhousie	United Kingdom	The brig was wrecked on Anticosti Island, British North America. All on board, over 140 people, survived. She was on a voyage from Fort William, Inverness-shire to Quebec City, Lower Canada, British North America.

== 7 September ==
List of shipwrecks: 7 September 1821
Ship	State	Description
Duke of Wellington	United Kingdom	The ship was wrecked on the coast of Argentina north of Bahía Blanca. She was on a voyage from Liverpool, Lancashire to Bahía Blanca.

== 8 September ==
List of shipwrecks: 8 September 1821
Ship	State	Description
Hero	(United Kingdom of Great Britain and Ireland) Saint Kitts	The schooner was driven ashore in Deep Bay, Saint Kitts in a hurricane.
Hobby	(United Kingdom of Great Britain and Ireland) Saint Kitts	The sloop foundered in Mount's Bay, Saint Kitts in a hurricane.
Lion	(United Kingdom of Great Britain and Ireland) Virgin Islands	The sloop was driven ashore and wrecked in a hurricane at Basseterre, Saint Kitts.

== 9 September ==
List of shipwrecks: 9 September 1821
Ship	State	Description
Commerce	United Kingdom	The brig was driven ashore and wrecked at Saint Thomas, Virgin Islands.
General Jackson	United Kingdom	The brig was driven ashore and wrecked at Nevis.
John	(United Kingdom of Great Britain and Ireland) Saint Kitts	The schooner was driven ashore and wrecked in a hurricane at Saint Barthélemy. Her crew were rescued.
John	(United Kingdom of Great Britain and Ireland) Nevis	The sloop was driven ashore at Nevis.
Mars	(United Kingdom of Great Britain and Ireland) Dominica	The sloop was driven ashore and wrecked at Nevis. She was on a voyage from Saint Thomas to Trinidad.
Missouri	United States	The schooner foundered off Saint Barthélemy in a hurricane.
Neptune	United Kingdom	The ship was wrecked on Saaremaa, Russia. Her crew were rescued. She was on a voyage from Saint Petersburg, Russia to Pillau, Prussia.
Polly and Nancy	United States	The schooner foundered off Saint Barthélemy in a hurricane.
Rachel	United Kingdom	The brig was driven ashore on Antigua.
Wootton	United Kingdom	The ship was wrecked at Montserrat. Her crew were rescued.

== 10 September ==
List of shipwrecks: 10 September 1821
Ship	State	Description
Basseterre	United Kingdom	The sloop was wrecked in a hurricane at Saint-Barthélemy.
Charles	United States	The ship was wrecked near Cape Hatteras, North Carolina with the loss of all hands.
Industry	United Kingdom	The sloop was driven ashore in a hurricane at Saint Barthélemy.
Isabella	United Kingdom	The sloop was driven ashore in a hurricane at Saint-Barthélemy.
John	United Kingdom	The schooner was wrecked in a hurricane at Saint-Barthélemy.
Morning Star	United Kingdom	The sloop was wrecked in a hurricane at Saint-Barthélemy.
Problem	United Kingdom	The schooner was driven ashore in a hurricane at Saint-Barthélemy.
Sally	United Kingdom	The schooner was driven ashore in a hurricane at Saint-Barthélemy.
Virginia	United Kingdom	The schooner sank in a hurricane at Saint-Barthélemy.

== 11 September ==
List of shipwrecks: 11 September 1821
Ship	State	Description
Major Crogan	United States	The ship foundered whilst on a voyage from Philadelphia, Pennsylvania to Port-au-Prince, Haiti. Her crew were rescued.

== 12 September ==
List of shipwrecks: 12 September 1821
Ship	State	Description
Albert	United States	The ship was wrecked on Long Island, New York.
Boston	United States	The ship capsized in the Atlantic Ocean during a gale. Three survivors were rescued on 29 September by Maryland (United States).
Trafalgar	United Kingdom	The ship foundered in the Bristol Channel off Swansea, Glamorgan. Her crew were rescued.

== 13 September ==
List of shipwrecks: 13 September 1821
Ship	State	Description
Albert	United States	The ship was wrecked on Long Island in a hurricane.
Amie	Haiti	The ship was lost off the Isle of Pines, Cuba. She was on a voyage from Port-au-Prince to Havana, Cuba.
Olive Branch	United States	The schooner was lost at Gebara, Cuba.
Hope	(United Kingdom of Great Britain and Ireland) British North America	The ship was wrecked on Great Heneaga. Her crew were rescued. She was on a voyage from Jamaica to Saint John, New Brunswick.

== 14 September ==
List of shipwrecks: 14 September 1821
Ship	State	Description
Cosmopolita	United States	The brig was wrecked of the Florida Reef. She was on a voyage from Charleston, South Carolina to New Orleans, Louisiana.
Friendship	United Kingdom	The ship was driven ashore and wrecked on Cape Barbier, Ottoman Empire. She was on a voyage from Alexandria, Egypt to Constantinople, Ottoman Empire.
Gascogne	France	The ship foundered off Cuba with the loss of all on board. She was on a voyage from Havana, Cuba to Bordeaux, Gironde.
Johanna	Hamburg	The ship was driven ashore at Pillau. She was on a voyage from Hamburg to Memel. Johanna was subsequently wrecked.
Leopard	United States	The brig was wrecked on Exuma, Bahamas.
Marguerite	Netherlands	The brig was wrecked on the coast of East Florida. She was on a voyage from Havana, Cuba to Antwerp.

== 15 September ==
List of shipwrecks: 15 September 1821
Ship	State	Description
John	United Kingdom	The ship was wrecked on the West Hoyle Sandbank, in Liverpool Bay. Her crew were rescued. She was on a voyage from Liverpool, Lancashire to Galway.

== 16 September ==
List of shipwrecks: 16 September 1821
Ship	State	Description
Anna	United Kingdom	The ship departed from Newfoundland for Poole, Dorset. No further trace, presuned foundered in the Atlantic Ocean with the loss of all hands.
Brisk	United States	The ship was driven ashore at New Orleans, Louisiana. She was on a voyage from Campeche, Mexico to New Orleans.
Devon	United Kingdom	The ship was wrecked on a reef off Cabo Corrientes, Cuba. Her crew survived. She was on a voyage from Jamaica to Cork.

== 17 September ==
List of shipwrecks: 17 September 1821
Ship	State	Description
John & Ann	United Kingdom	The ship sank at Great Yarmouth, Norfolk.
Elizabeth	United Kingdom	The ship was severely damaged by fire at Liverpool, Lancashire.
Looe	United Kingdom	The ship was driven ashore near Berck-sur-Mer, Pas-de-Calais, France. She was on a voyage from Plymouth, Devon to Portsmouth, Hampshire.
Maryland	United States	The ship was driven ashore and wrecked at Pensacola, East Florida.

== 18 September ==
List of shipwrecks: 18 September 1821
Ship	State	Description
Mayflower	United Kingdom	The ship was wrecked on the Runnel Stone, off Land's End, Cornwall. Her crew were rescued by Charles (United Kingdom). She was on a voyage from Newport, Monmouthshire to Plymouth, Devon.
Resolution	United Kingdom	The ship was driven ashore near Cucq, Pas-de-Calais, France. She was on a voyage from Susa, Ottoman Tripolitania to London.
Sisters	United Kingdom	The ship was driven askore at Galway.
William and Margaret	United Kingdom	The ship foundered in Liverpool Bay off Rossall, Lancashire. Her crew were rescued. She was on a voyage from Oban, Argyllshire to Liverpool, Lancashire.

== 19 September ==
List of shipwrecks: 19 September 1821
Ship	State	Description
Brutus	(United Kingdom of Great Britain and Ireland) Jamaica	The sloop was wrecked on Downer's Bluff, Jamaica.
Susan and Mary	United Kingdom	The ship was driven ashore at Mockbeggar, Cheshire and was abandoned by her crew. She was on a voyage from Waterford to Liverpool, Lancashire. Susan and Mary was refloated on 21 September and taken in to Hoylake, Lancashire.

== 21 September ==
List of shipwrecks: 21 September 1821
Ship	State	Description
Sarah	United Kingdom	The ship was wrecked on the Barber Sand, in the North Sea. She was on a voyage from Newcastle upon Tyne, Northumberland to Great Yarmouth, Norfolk.

== 22 September ==
List of shipwrecks: 22 September 1821
Ship	State	Description
Fanny	United Kingdom	The ship was wrecked off Chipiona, Spain. Her crew were rescued. She was on a voyage from Cádiz to St. Lucar. Spain.

== 23 September ==
List of shipwrecks: 23 September 1821
Ship	State	Description
Aurora	United Kingdom	The ship was lost off Maranhão, Brazil. She was on a voyage from Liverpool, Lancashire to Maranhão.
Nadezhda (Надежда, 'Hope')	Imperial Russian Navy	The transport ship, a yacht, was driven ashore in the eastern part of Narva Bay. Her crew survived. She was on a voyage from Reval to Narva. Nadezhda was refloated next month. (Note: Chernyshev gives the year as 1824, presumably due to sourcing from Sokolov without noticing the 1824 to 1821 correction in the attached s:ru:errata list.)
Sally	United Kingdom	The sloop was in collision with a sloop off Barnstaple, Devon and was abandoned by her crew. She was later taken in to Barnstaple.
Sukhum (Сухум, 'Sukhumi')	Imperial Russian Navy	The brigantine was driven ashore in the mouth of the Sulina branch of the Danube, she sank three weeks later. Her crew were rescued. She was on a voyage from Sevastopol to Nikolayev.

== 24 September ==
List of shipwrecks: 24 September 1821
Ship	State	Description
Esther	United Kingdom	The ship was driven ashore and wrecked at Barnegat, New Jersey, United States. Her crew were rescued. She was on a voyage from Demerara to Saint John, New Brunswick, British North America.

== 26 September ==
List of shipwrecks: 26 September 1821
Ship	State	Description
Darien	United Kingdom	The ship was wrecked off Bardsey Island. All on board were rescued, She was on a voyage from Virginia, United States to Liverpool, Lancashire.

== 27 September ==
List of shipwrecks: 27 September 1821
Ship	State	Description
Harmonie	Prussia	The ship was lost off Barra, Outer Hebrides, United Kingdom. She was on a voyage from Liverpool, Lancashire, United Kingdom to Pillau.

== 28 September ==
List of shipwrecks: 28 September 1821
Ship	State	Description
Bee	United Kingdom	The ship was wrecked at Bideford, Devon with the loss of all hands.
John and Ann	United Kingdom	The ship was driven ashore at Great Yarmouth, Norfolk. She was on a voyage rom Saint Petersburg, Russia to London.
Mackarel	(United Kingdom of Great Britain and Ireland) Jamaica	The ship was wrecked near Port Morant. She was on a voyage from Kingston to Montecristo, Colombia.

== 29 September ==
List of shipwrecks: 29 September 1821
Ship	State	Description
Fürst Blücher	Danzig	The ship was wrecked on "Inch Island". Her crew were rescued, She was on a voyage from Danzig to Liverpool, Lancashire, United Kingdom.
John	United Kingdom	The ship was wrecked on the West Hoyle Sandbank, in Liverpool Bay. Her crew were rescued. She was on a voyage from Liverpool to Galway.
Minerva	United Kingdom	The sloop was driven ashore at Hoylake, Lancashire.
Rosalind	United Kingdom	The ship was abandoned in the North Sea (62°45′N 2°13′E). Her crew were rescued by Lucretia (United Kingdom. She was on a voyage from Arkhangelsk, Russia to London.

== 30 September ==
List of shipwrecks: 30 September 1821
Ship	State	Description
Eliza and James	United Kingdom	The ship was run down and sunk in the North Sea off Flamborough Head, Yorkshire by Good Design (United Kingdom). Her crew were rescued.
Favorite	(United Kingdom of Great Britain and Ireland) Tobago	The sloop struck a reef off Point Saline, Grenada and consequently foundered. Her crew were rescued.
Superb	United Kingdom	The ship was driven onto a sandbank off Inverkip, Renfrewshire. She was on a voyage from Málaga, Spain to Greenock, Renfrewshire. She was refloated on 3 October.
Valentine	United Kingdom	The ship struck a rock and foundered in the Mediterranean Sea off "Fano Island". Her crew survived. She was on a voyage from Livorno, Grand Duchy of Tuscany to Corfu.

== Unknown date ==
List of shipwrecks: Unknown date 1821
Ship	State	Description
Ann	United States	The ship was driven ashore at Aux Cayes, Haiti between 2 and 4 September.
Ant	United Kingdom	The ship sprang a leak and foundered in the Irish Sea off the coast of Pembrokeshire. Her crew survived.
Charming Peggy	United Kingdom	The ship was driven ashore and wrecked on the Isle of Man in early September. She was on a voyage from Cardiff, Glamorgan to Coleraine, County Antrim.
Fly	United Kingdom	The ship was lost off "Maldonada before 10 September.
Hannah	United States	The ship was lost on the Colorados. She was on a voyage from St. Jago, Jamaica to Philadelphia, Pennsylvania.
John	United States	The brig was captured by pirates off Matanzas, Cuba. She was set afire and burnt. Her crew were murdered.
Josephine	France	The ship was lost off "Maldonada" before 10 September.
Lady Stanley	United Kingdom	The ship was wrecked at Arkhangelsk, Russia in early September.
Peace	United States	The ship was driven ashore at Aux Cayes between 2 and 4 September.
Prince Regent	United Kingdom	The ship was wrecked on the Cat Keys, Bahamas before 5 September. Her crew were rescued. She was on a voyage from Jamaica to Halifax, Nova Scotia, British North America.
Repeater	United Kingdom	The ship capsized off Point Lookout, New York, United States. She was on a voyage from Norfolk, Virginia, United States to Liverpool, Lancashire.
Rover	United States	The ship was driven ashore at Aux Cayes between 2 and 4 September.
St. Nicolay	Russia	The ship was driven ashore in the White Sea. She was on a voyage from Arkhangelsk to Amsterdam, North Holland, Netherlands.
Titus	United Kingdom	The ship was driven ashore at Cape Barbier, Ottoman Empire. She was on a voyage from Alexandria, Egypt to Constantinople, Ottoman Empire. Titus was later refloated, she arrived at Constantinople on 25 September.
Young Josephine	France	The ship was lost near Maldonado, Brazil in early September with the loss of most of her crew.
