= Portsmouth Harbor Light =

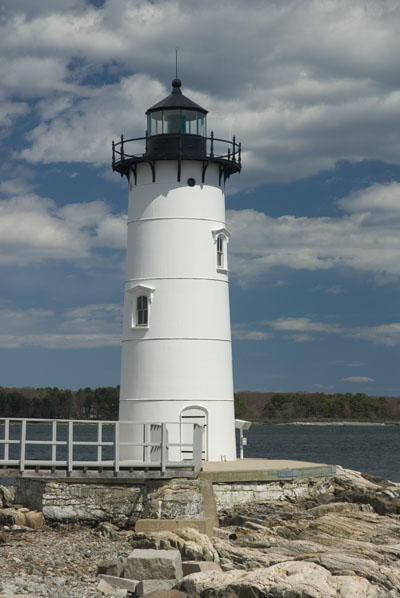
- Portsmouth Harbor Lighthouse
- Location: Portsmouth Harbor, Piscataqua River, New Castle, New Hampshire
- Coordinates: 43°4′15.7″N 70°42′30.9″W

Tower
- Constructed: 1771 (original tower); 1878 (current tower)
- Construction: Cast-iron & Brick
- Automated: 1960
- Height: 48-foot (15 m)
- Shape: Conical
- Heritage: National Register of Historic Places listed place

Light
- First lit: 1878
- Focal height: 16 m (52 ft)
- Lens: Fourth order Fresnel, 1854
- Range: 12 nautical miles (22 km; 14 mi)
- Characteristic: Fixed Green
- Portsmouth Harbor Light
- U.S. National Register of Historic Places
- Area: less than one acre
- Built: 1804
- Built by: United States Lighthouse Board
- Architect: James Chatham Duane
- Architectural style: Late Victorian
- MPS: Light Stations of the United States MPS
- NRHP reference No.: 09000816
- Added to NRHP: October 8, 2009

The Portsmouth Harbor Light is a historic lighthouse located within Fort Constitution in New Castle, New Hampshire, United States.

== History ==
The light station was established in 1771, the 10th of 11 created prior to the American Revolution. A shingled wooden tower with an iron lantern and copper roof, the lighthouse was illuminated by three copper oil lamps.

The first tower was replaced in 1804 by an 80-foot (24 m) octagonal wooden structure approximately 100 yards (91 m) to the east. In 1831 Whaleback Light was erected in the outer harbor. Twenty years later the Portsmouth Harbor light was shortened to 55 feet (17 m). In 1854, the tower was fitted with a Fourth (4th) Order Fresnel lens.

In 1878, a new 48-foot (15 m) cast-iron, brick-lined lighthouse was erected on the foundation of the 1804 tower.

The current light is a fixed green signal that is visible for 12 nautical miles (22 km; 14 mi). An acrylic cylinder surrounding the lens provides its color.

Other structures at the light station include the 1903 oil house (restored in 2004) and the 1872 keeper's house (currently United States Coast Guard offices).

The light was added to National Register of Historic Places in 2009.

== Friends of Portsmouth Harbor Lighthouses ==
The Friends of Portsmouth Harbor Lighthouses is a chapter of the American Lighthouse Foundation (ALF). Founded in 2001, its mission is to preserve the Portsmouth Harbor Lighthouses and associated structures, which since 2008 has included Whaleback Light, as well as gather, preserve, and share the history of the historic sites with the public.

The group is licensed through ALF to care for the Portsmouth Harbor light tower, oil house, and wooden walkway.

The United States Coast Guard owns Portsmouth Harbor Lighthouse and still maintains the active aids to navigation equipment.

== See also ==
- National Register of Historic Places listings in Rockingham County, New Hampshire
