= Little River Light =

Lighthouse in Maine, US

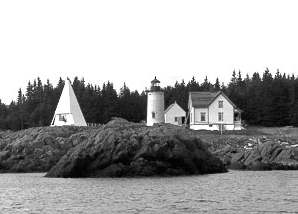
- US Coast Guard photo, no date
- Location: Cutler, Maine
- Coordinates: 44°39′3.186″N 67°11′31.544″W

Tower
- Constructed: 1846
- Automated: 1974
- Height: 12 m (39 ft)
- Shape: Cylindrical Cast Iron Tower
- Markings: White
- Heritage: National Register of Historic Places listed place
- Fog signal: HORN: 1 every 10s operates continuously

Light
- First lit: 1876 (current structure)
- Deactivated: 1975-2001
- Focal height: 56 feet (17 m)
- Lens: VRB-25
- Range: 13 nautical miles (24 km; 15 mi)
- Characteristic: Fl W 6s
- Little River Light Station
- U.S. National Register of Historic Places
- U.S. Historic district
- Nearest city: Cutler, Maine
- Built: 1876
- Architect: US Army Corps of Engineers
- MPS: Light Stations of Maine MPS
- NRHP reference No.: 88000156
- Added to NRHP: March 14, 1988

Little River Light is a lighthouse on an island at the mouth of the Little River, in Cutler, Maine. A light station was first established at this site in 1846, and the present structure was built in 1876. It is one of the only iron lighthouses in the state, and was listed on the National Register of Historic Places as Little River Light Station on March 14, 1988. The light station is now owned by the American Lighthouse Foundation, which offers overnight stays in the keeper's house, and occasional tours of the property.

== Description and history ==
The Little River is an east–west tidal inlet on the coast of Down East Maine, with the town of Cutler on its northern bank. At the mouth of the inlet stands Little River Island, near whose easternmost point the lighthouse stands. The station consists of a tower, keeper's house, oilhouse, and boathouse. The tower is an iron structure, with a supporting frame of steel and brick. It is 35 feet (11 m) tall, with an octagonal lantern house surrounded by a metal balcony and railing. Entrance is gained via a projecting gable-roofed vestibule. The keeper's house is an L-shaped two-story wood-frame structure, with a shed-roof ell across one side. The oilhouse is a small brick gable-roofed structure set a short way inland. The boathouse, a simple wood-frame structure, is located at the western end of the island, connected to the rest of the station by a wooden boardwalk.

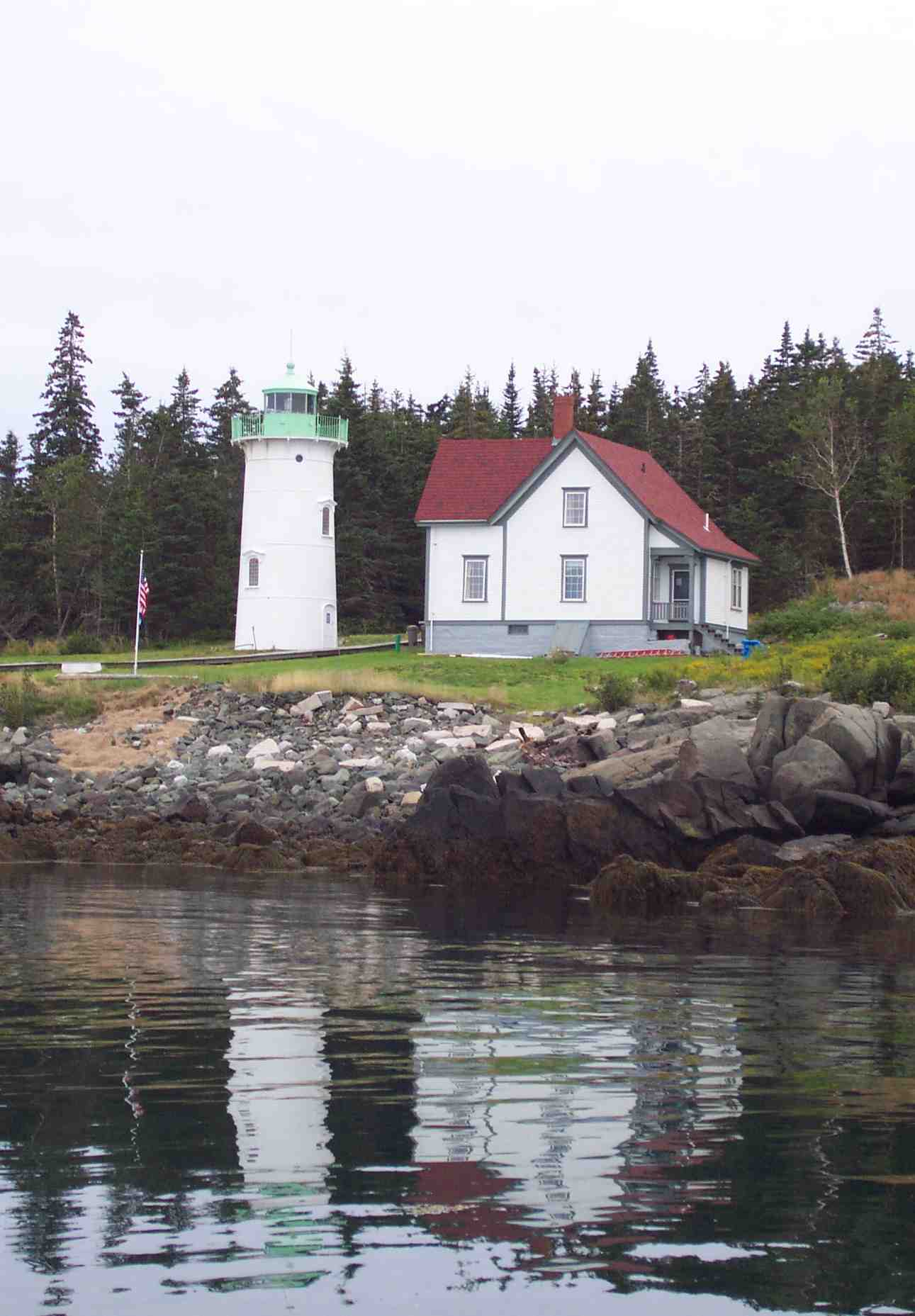
Little River Lighthouse, Cutler, ME

The light station on Little River Island was authorized in 1846, and began operation the following year. The present tower was built in 1876 by the United States Army Corps of Engineers, and the house was built in 1888, replacing an earlier stone structure. The boathouse dates to 1881, and the oilhouse was added in 1905. In 1916, the original 5th order Fresnel lens was upgraded to a 4th order. In the 1960s the Fresnel lens was removed and a DCB-10 rotating lens put in its place. The light was automated in 1975 when a modern 300mm optic was placed on a nearby steel skeleton tower. In 2001 the tower was leased to the American Lighthouse Foundation, which restored the tower, allowing the light to be displayed once again in the original lantern. A Vega revolving beacon was lit there on October 2, 2001, after 26 years of darkness in a ceremony attended by over 1000 people. Because the event was timed shortly after the events of 9–11, the relighting was noted as a "Beacon of Freedom to the World." The keeper's house has since been fully restored and is available through for overnight stays. Periodic open houses of the property are offered during the summer months.

== See also ==
- National Register of Historic Places listings in Washington County, Maine
