= USS Highland Light =

Unclassified miscellaneous vessel

History

United States
- Namesake: Highland Light
- Builder: George Lawley & Son
- Completed: 1931
- Acquired: 26 October 1940
- Stricken: 1 April 1965
- Fate: Sold to private owner

General characteristics
- Displacement: 32 tons
- Length: 68 ft 7 in (20.90 m)
- Beam: 15 ft 4 in (4.67 m)
- Propulsion: Sail
- Sail plan: Cutter rig

USS Highland Light (IX-48), an unclassified miscellaneous vessel, was the only ship of the United States Navy to have that name, which was retained from her previous owner. She was designed by Frank Payne and built by George Lawley & Son in 1931 for Dudley Wolfe, who raced her to the first under-three-day time in the Bermuda Race in 1932, a record that stood until 1974. Wolfe was killed in 1939 in a failed attempt to climb K2, and the yacht was donated to the United States Navy for use at the United States Naval Academy. The craft was acquired 26 October 1940 and remained in service at the academy until struck from the Naval Vessel Register on 1 April 1965. Highland Light has since passed through several owners and is currently for sale. The Highland Light Trophy at the USNA is constructed from the ship's wheel.

== Awards ==
- American Defense Service Medal
- American Campaign Medal
- World War II Victory Medal
- National Defense Service Medal – 2 awards
