= Truro Highlands Historic District =

Historic district in Massachusetts, United States

- U.S. National Register of Historic Places
- U.S. Historic district
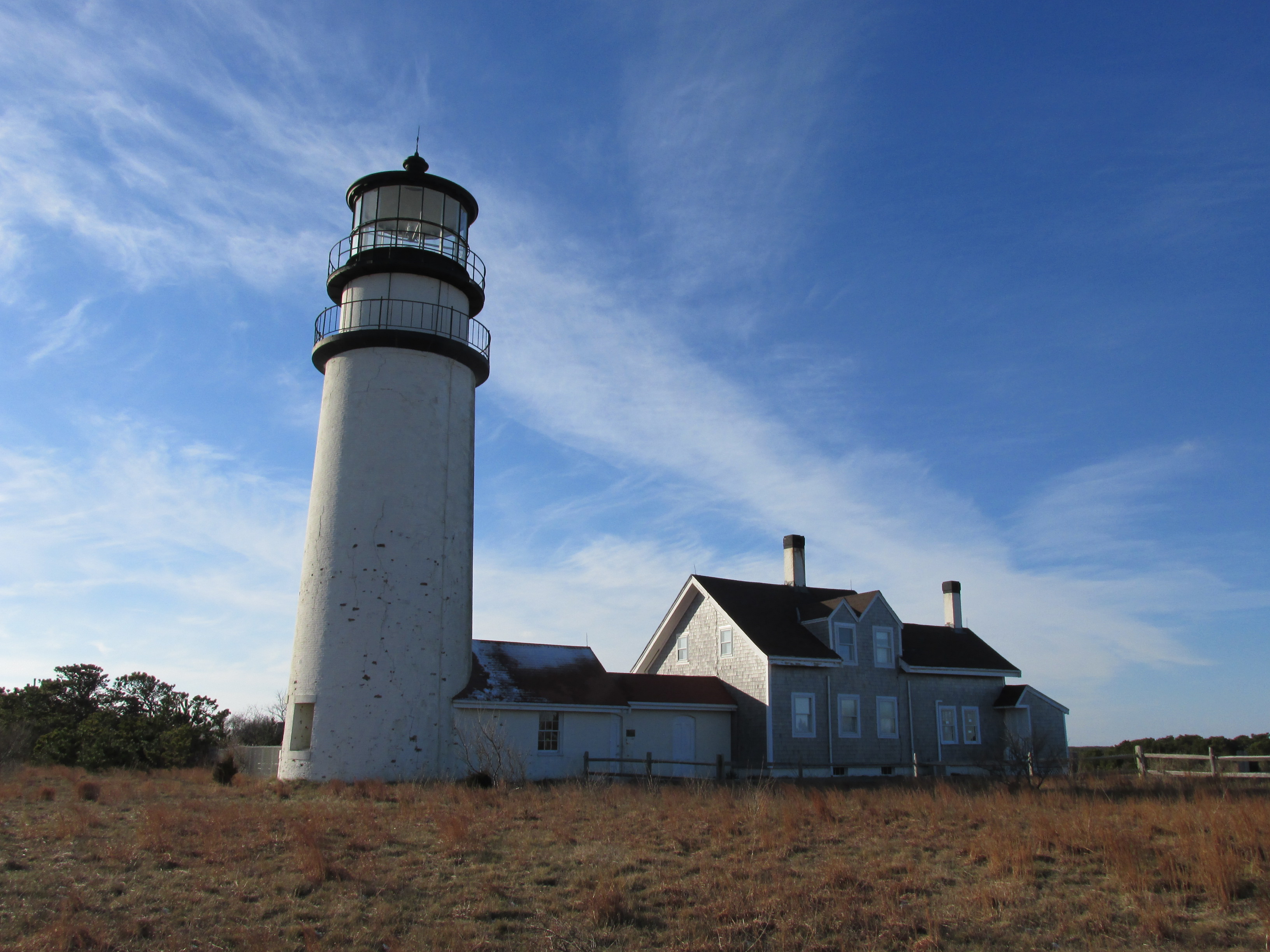
- Highland Light Station

- Location within Cape Cod Location within Massachusetts Location within the United States
- Location: Truro, Massachusetts
- Coordinates: 42°02′22″N 70°3′44″W
- Area: 85.9 acres (34.8 ha)
- NRHP reference No.: 11000823
- Added to NRHP: November 22, 2011

The Truro Highlands Historic District encompasses an area of North Truro, Massachusetts, within the Cape Cod National Seashore, that has served as a recreational destination for more than 175 years. The major features of the district, which is centered on Highland Road east of US Route 6, are the Highland Light Station, the Highland House (now a museum), and the Highland Golf Links, one of the oldest golf courses on Cape Cod.

The district was added to the National Register of Historic Places in 2011.

== See also ==
- National Register of Historic Places listings in Cape Cod National Seashore
- National Register of Historic Places listings in Barnstable County, Massachusetts
