= Egg Rock Light (Maine) =

Lighthouse in Maine, US

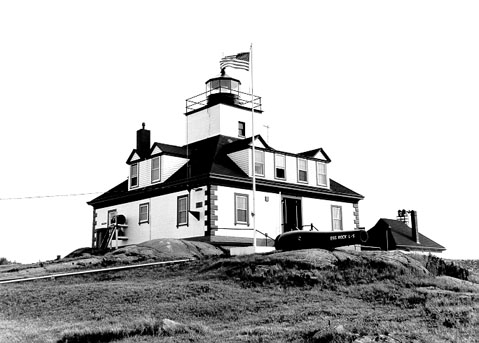
- Location: Frenchman Bay, Maine
- Coordinates: 44°21′14.188″N 68°8′18.033″W

Tower
- Constructed: 1875
- Construction: brick
- Automated: 1976
- Height: 12 m (39 ft)
- Shape: Brick Tower in middle of Wood House
- Markings: White
- Heritage: National Register of Historic Places listed place
- Fog signal: HORN: 2 every 30s

Light
- Focal height: 64 feet (20 m)
- Lens: VRB-25
- Range: 18 nautical miles (33 km; 21 mi)
- Characteristic: Fl R 5s
- Egg Rock Light Station
- U.S. National Register of Historic Places
- U.S. Historic district
- Nearest city: Winter Harbor, Maine
- Area: 11.8 acres (4.8 ha)
- Built: 1875
- Architect: US Army Corps of Engineers
- MPS: Light Stations of Maine MPS
- NRHP reference No.: 87002270
- Added to NRHP: January 21, 1988

Egg Rock Light is a lighthouse on Frenchman Bay, Maine. Built in 1875, it is one of coastal Maine's architecturally unique lighthouses, with a square tower projecting through the square keeper's house. Located on Egg Rock, midway between Mount Desert Island and the Schoodic Peninsula, it is an active aid to navigation, flashing red every 40 seconds. The light was listed on the National Register of Historic Places as Egg Rock Light Station in 1988.

== Description and history ==
The Egg Rock Light Station consists of two buildings, a combination light tower and keeper's house, and a fog station building. The keeper's house is a roughly square 1 1/2-story wood-frame building, with a hip roof pierced by dormers on all four sides. The painted brick tower, 40 feet (12 m) high, rises through the center of the house. The light is a VRB-25 aerobeacon, mounted in a 1986 replacement lantern house. It is configured to flash red every 40 seconds. The fog station is a brick structure southwest of the main building, with a gable-on-hip roof.

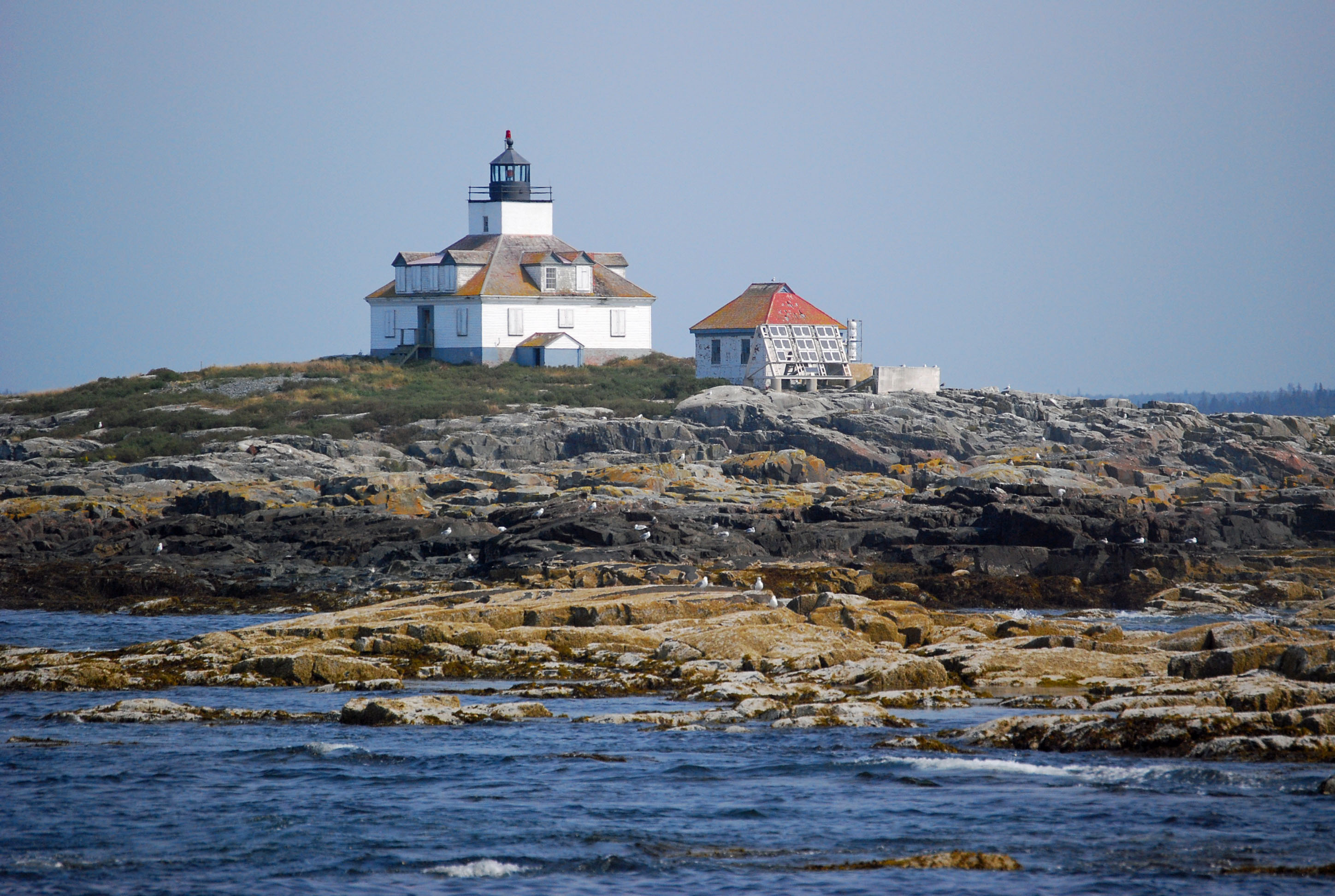
Egg Rock Light

The Egg Rock light originally was fitted with a fifth-order Fresnel lens. The fog station (originally steam-powered) was added in 1904. The station was automated by the United States Coast Guard in 1976, at which time its ancillary structures except the fog station were torn down. The lantern house was removed and the light was replaced by the present aerobeacon. After public protest, a replacement lantern house was installed in 1986. The light continues to be managed by the Coast Guard, and is not open to the public; the island and buildings are owned by the United States Fish and Wildlife Service.

== See also ==
- National Register of Historic Places listings in Hancock County, Maine
