= Eben Emerson =

American lighthouse keeper

Eben Emerson was an American lighthouse keeper who served at Wood Island Light, Maine from 1861 to 1865.

On March 16, 1865, he saved the crew of the British brig Edyth Anne from drowning in a heavy storm near the lighthouse; for this action he was commended by the Canadian government and rewarded with binoculars.

His name is also given as "Ebenezer Emerson".

== See also ==
Lighthouse Digest article
