= Wood Island Light =

Lighthouse in Maine, US

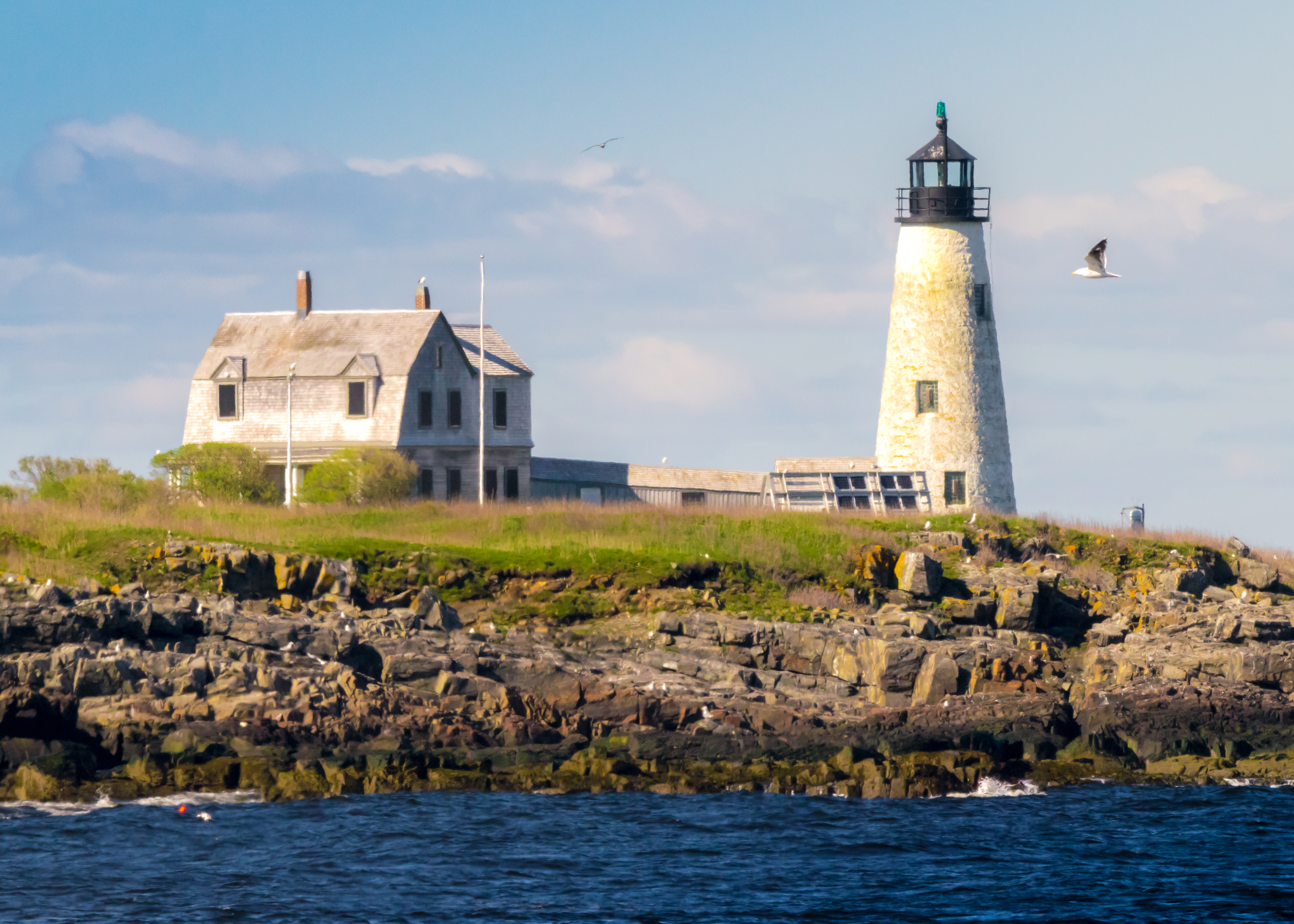
- Wood Island Light in May 2017
- Location: Biddeford, Maine
- Coordinates: 43°27′24.7″N 70°19′44.6″W

Tower
- Constructed: 1808
- Foundation: Natural Emplaced
- Construction: Granite rubble
- Automated: 1986
- Height: 47 feet (14 m)
- Shape: conical
- Markings: White with black lantern
- Heritage: National Register of Historic Places listed place
- Fog signal: Horn: 2 every 30 seconds

Light
- First lit: 1858 (current tower)
- Focal height: 71 feet (22 m)
- Lens: 4th order Fresnel lens (original), VLB-44 (current)
- Range: White: 18 nautical miles (33 km; 21 mi), green: 16 nautical miles (30 km; 18 mi)
- Characteristic: Alternating white and green lights every 10 seconds
- Wood Island Light Station
- U.S. National Register of Historic Places
- U.S. Historic district
- Nearest city: Biddeford, Maine
- Area: 5 acres (2.0 ha)
- Built: 1808
- Architect: US Army Corps of Engineers
- MPS: Light Stations of Maine MPS
- NRHP reference No.: 87002274
- Added to NRHP: January 21, 1988

Wood Island Light is an active lighthouse on the eastern edge of Wood Island in Saco Bay, on the southern coast of Maine. The light is just outside the entrance to Biddeford Pool and the end of the Saco River. The lighthouse is a 47-foot (14 m) conical white tower of granite rubble. The light itself sits 71 feet (22 m) above mean high water. Its automated beacon alternates between green and white every 10 seconds.

Wood Island Light is Maine's second-oldest lighthouse (after Portland Head Light) and the nation's eleventh-oldest. It was added to the National Register of Historic Places as Wood Island Light Station on January 21, 1988, reference number 87002274.

The United States Coast Guard maintains the active beacon of the lighthouse, while The Friends of Wood Island Light, a non-profit organization, has assisted the Coast Guard by maintaining and restoring parts of the lighthouse and keepers dwellings.

== History ==
Wood Island Light was established in 1808 under the orders of President Thomas Jefferson. The original tower was an octagonal wooden structure. After it rotted, a granite tower was erected to replace it in 1839. In 1858, the new tower was renovated to allow the installation of a 4th-order Fresnel lens. The current keepers dwellings were also built then.

In the 1960s, the original lantern room was removed and an aerobeacon was installed. This was deemed unsightly by locals and when the lighthouse was automated in 1986, a new lantern room was fabricated and installed on the lighthouse along with a VRB-25 beacon, then the latest technology. In 2013, the VRB-25 was replaced by a VLB-44, an LED beacon with a service life of ten years.

== Legends and lore ==
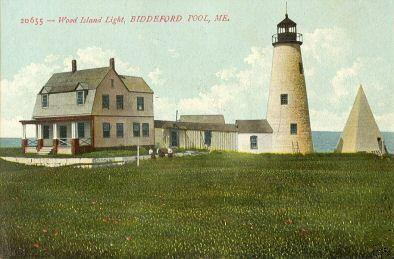
Wood Island Light in 1910

Eben Emerson served as Lightkeeper from 1861 to 1865. On March 16, 1865, he saved the crew of the British brig Edyth Anne from drowning in a heavy storm near the lighthouse; for this action he was commended by the Canadian government and rewarded with a pair of binoculars.

Thomas Henry Orcutt, a former sea captain and previous keeper at Saddleback Ledge Light, served as keeper of Wood Island Light for 19 years (1886–1905). His dog, Sailor, became famous for ringing the station's fog bell to greet passing ships by taking the bell cord in mouth and pulling it with his teeth.

In the 1890s, Wood Island Light and Wood Island were host to a grisly murder-suicide. A local squatter and part-time lobsterman was living on the west end of the island. The squatter had been involved in an earlier altercation on the mainland and was approached by a sheriff's deputy in his squatter shack on the island. The squatter murdered the sheriff's deputy. Realizing what he had done, he attempted to turn himself in to lighthouse keeper Orcutt who, in fear, turned him away. The squatter returned to his shack and committed suicide. Legend has it that the ghost of the murdered deputy still haunts the lighthouse and island.

== Keepers ==
- Benjamin Cole (1808–1809)
- Philip Goldthwaite (1809–1832)
- Tristam Goldthwaite (1832–1833)
- Abraham Norwood (1833–1841)
- John Adams (1841-unknown)
- Stephen D. Batchelder (1849-unknown)
- Nathaniel Varrell (185?)
- L.F. Varrell (185?)
- Joseph R. Bryant (1854-1861?)
- Ebenezer Emerson (1861–1865)
- Edwin Tarbox (1865–1872)
- Albert Norwood (1872–1886)
- Thomas Henry Orcutt (1886–1905)
- Charles A. Burke (1905–1914)
- C.B. Staples (1914–1917)
- W. F. Lurvey (1917–1923)
- Albert Staples (1923–1926)
- George Woodward (1927–1934)

== Viewing ==
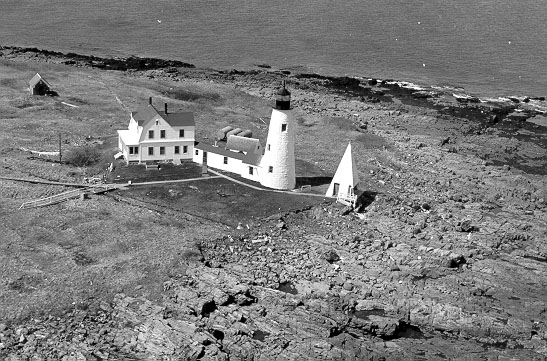
An aerial view from the USCG

Wood Island Light is viewable from just beyond the southern end of SR-208 off Biddeford Pool, Maine. To reach the best viewing spot, proceed beyond SR-208's southern terminus 0.6 miles (0.97 km) along Lester B Orcutt Blvd. There is an entrance to an Audubon trail on the left side of the road. Follow this path to the ocean. Wood Island Light is across the channel.

Friends of Wood Island Lighthouse runs seasonal tours out to the island and lighthouse from Biddeford Pool.

== Wildlife ==
The island supports a small population of deer who swim the half mile to and from Biddeford Pool. When visiting the island it is a rare treat to spot them. The best viewing can often be in winter from the East Point Sanctuary in Biddeford Pool. In winter it is not uncommon to spot snowy owls on the island. Rafts of eiders, scoters and loons are present in the winter. Brants and cormorants arrive in early spring.

== See also ==
- National Register of Historic Places listings in York County, Maine
