= Highland Light =

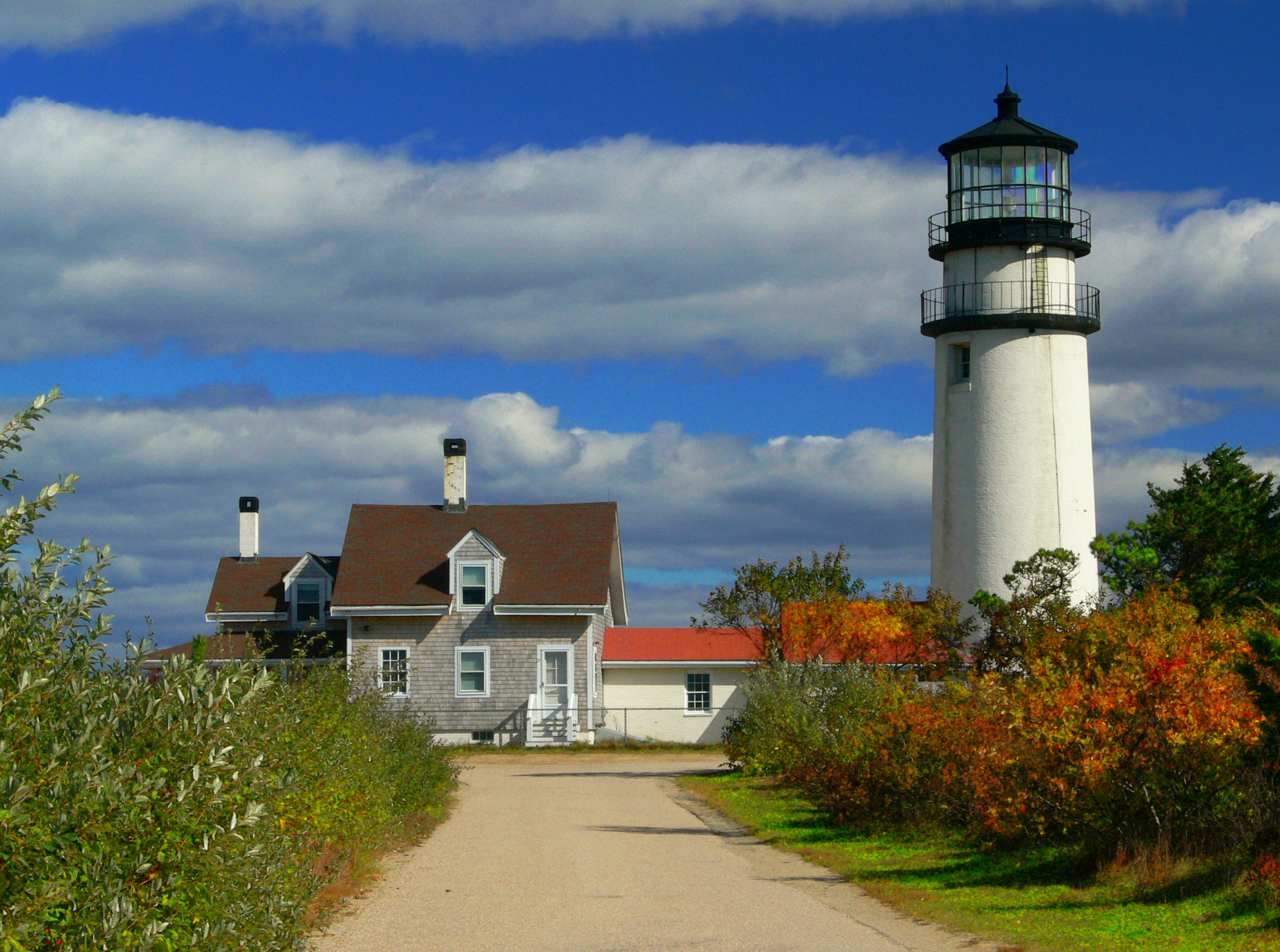
- Location: North Truro, Massachusetts
- Coordinates: 42°2′22.282″N 70°3′39.377″W

Tower
- Constructed: 1797
- Foundation: Natural/emplaced
- Construction: Brick
- Automated: 1987
- Height: 66 feet (20 m)
- Shape: Conical
- Markings: White with black lantern
- Heritage: National Register of Historic Places listed place
- Fog signal: none

Light
- First lit: 1857 (current structure)
- Focal height: 170 feet (52 m)
- Lens: 1st order Fresnel lens (original), VegaMarine LED Beacon (current)
- Range: 18 nautical miles (33 km; 21 mi)
- Characteristic: Fl W 5s, lighted continuously
- Highland Light Station
- U.S. National Register of Historic Places
- U.S. Historic district – Contributing property
- Location: Off SR 6, Truro, Massachusetts
- Area: 6.5 acres (2.6 ha)
- Built: 1857
- Architectural style: Queen Anne
- Part of: Truro Highlands Historic District (ID11000823)
- MPS: Lighthouses of Massachusetts TR
- NRHP reference No.: 87001463

Significant dates
- Added to NRHP: June 15, 1987
- Designated CP: November 22, 2011

The Highland Light (previously known as Cape Cod Light) is an active lighthouse on the Cape Cod National Seashore in North Truro, Massachusetts. The current tower was erected in 1857, replacing two earlier towers that had been built in 1797 and 1831. It is the oldest and tallest lighthouse on Cape Cod.

The grounds are open year-round, while the light is open to the public from May until late October, with guided tours available. Highland Light is owned by the National Park Service, and was cared for by the Highland Museum and Lighthouse, Inc. until 2014 when Eastern National, another non-profit group, took over the contract to operate the facility as a tourist attraction. The United States Coast Guard operates the light as an aid to navigation. The United States Navy ship USS Highland Light (IX-48) was named after the light. It is listed on the National Register of Historic Places as Highland Light Station.

== History ==
In 1797, a station authorized by George Washington was established at this point on the Cape, with a wood lighthouse to warn ships about the dangerous coastline between Cape Ann and Nantucket. It was the first light on Cape Cod. In 1833, the wood structure was replaced by a brick tower and in 1840 a new lantern and lighting apparatus was installed. In 1857 the lighthouse was declared dangerous and demolished, and for a total cost of $17,000, the current 66-foot brick tower was constructed.

On June 6, 1900, the light was changed from a fixed beam to flashing, with a new. The new Barbier, Benard & Turenne first-order Fresnel lens had four panels of 0.92 meter focal distance, revolved in mercury, and gave, every five seconds, flashes of about 192,000 candlepower nearly one-half second in duration. While the new lens was being installed, the light from a third-order lens was exhibited atop a temporary tower erected near the lighthouse; it was later sold at auction. The Highland Light was then the most powerful on the east coast of the United States. Two four-horsepower oil engines with compressors operated by an engine fueled by kerosene, were added to ensure that the fog signal could be activated within ten minutes instead of the previous 45. A new fog signal was installed in 1929, an electrically operated air oscillator, to make it audible over a greater distance.

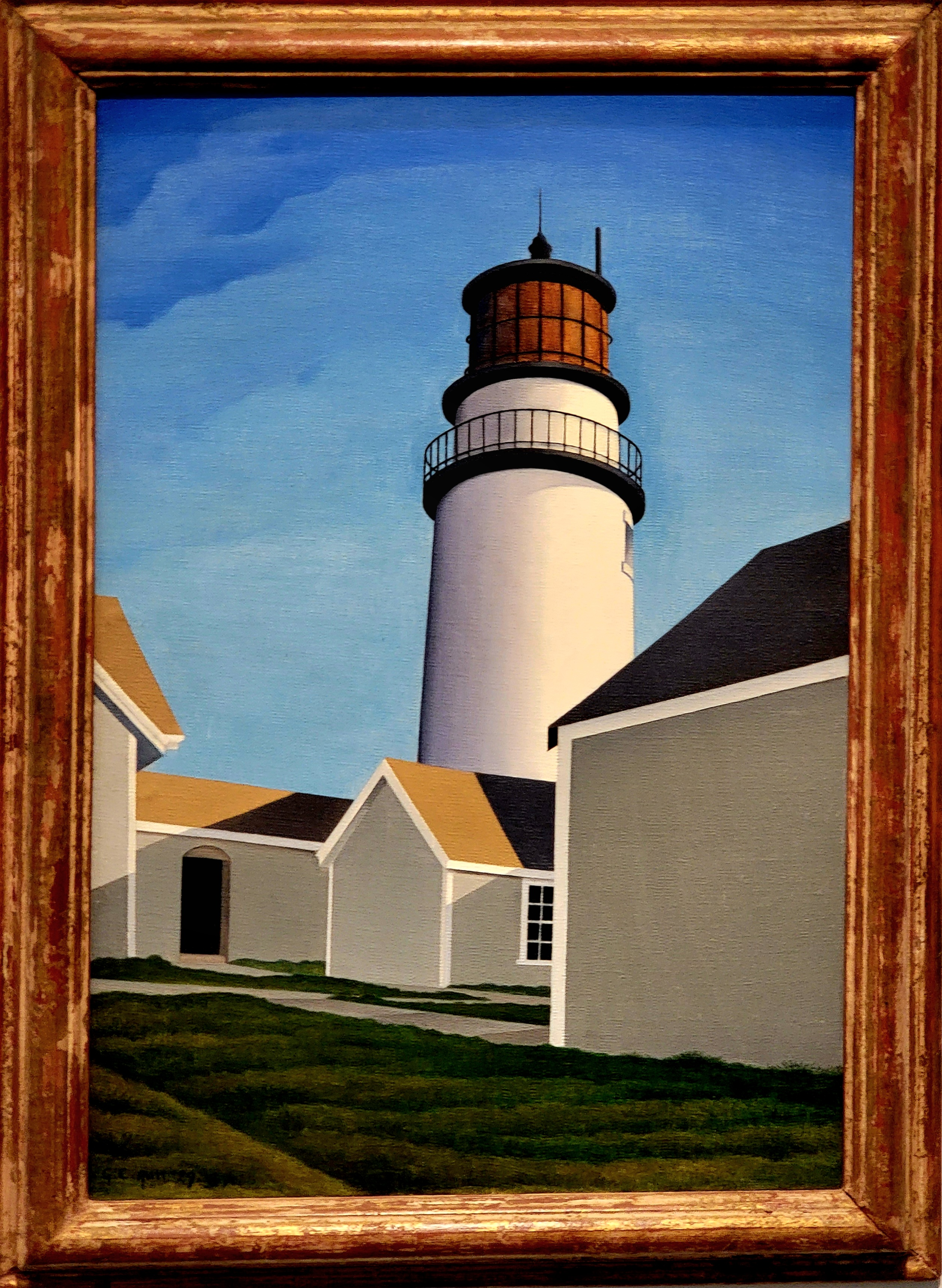
1929 painting of Highland Light by George C. Ault

The lighthouse was converted to electric operation in 1932 with a 1000-watt beacon. In 1946, Highland Light's Fresnel lens was replaced by modern aerobeacons, first by a Crouse-Hinds DCB-36 double rotating light and then by a Carlisle & Finch DCB-224, with a second unit as backup. Unfortunately, the Fresnel lens was severely damaged when it was removed, but fragments are on display in the museum on site. The light was fully automated by 1986 with a Crouse-Hinds DCB-224 rotating beacon. In 1998, a VRB-25 optical system was installed. Most recently, the light source is a Vega Marine LED beacon model 44/2.5 installed in April 2017.

The current location of the lighthouse is not the original site. It was in danger of falling down the cliff due to beach erosion, so the structure was moved 450 feet (140 m) to the west. The government funding to do so was supplemented by money raised through fund raising by the Truro Historical Society. The move was accomplished by International Chimney Corp. of Buffalo, New York and Expert House Movers of Maryland over a period of 18 days in July, 1996. The move left the light station on Cape Cod National Seashore property, bordering the Highland Golf Course. After an errant golf ball broke a window, they were replaced with unbreakable material. In 1998, the keeper's house was modified to be a gift shop and museum. The lighthouse grounds are open year-round on Highland Light Road in Truro, with tours and the museum available from a National Park Service partner, Eastern National, during the summer months.

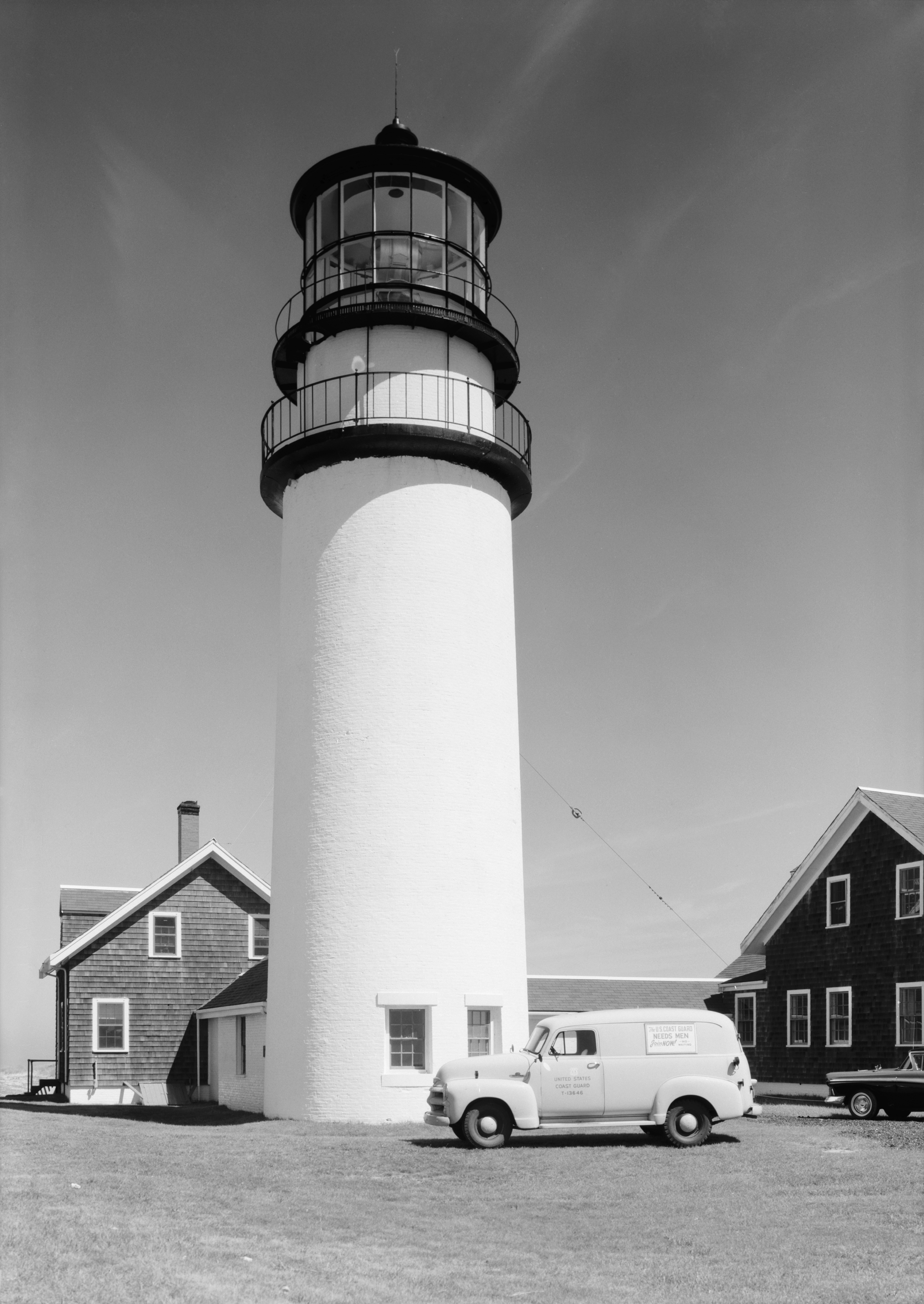
1959 photo from the Historic American Buildings Survey Collection, Library of Congress

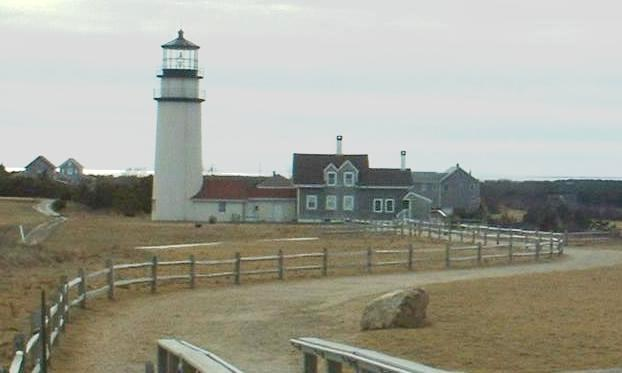
The original location of the lighthouse is indicated by the boulder in the foreground.

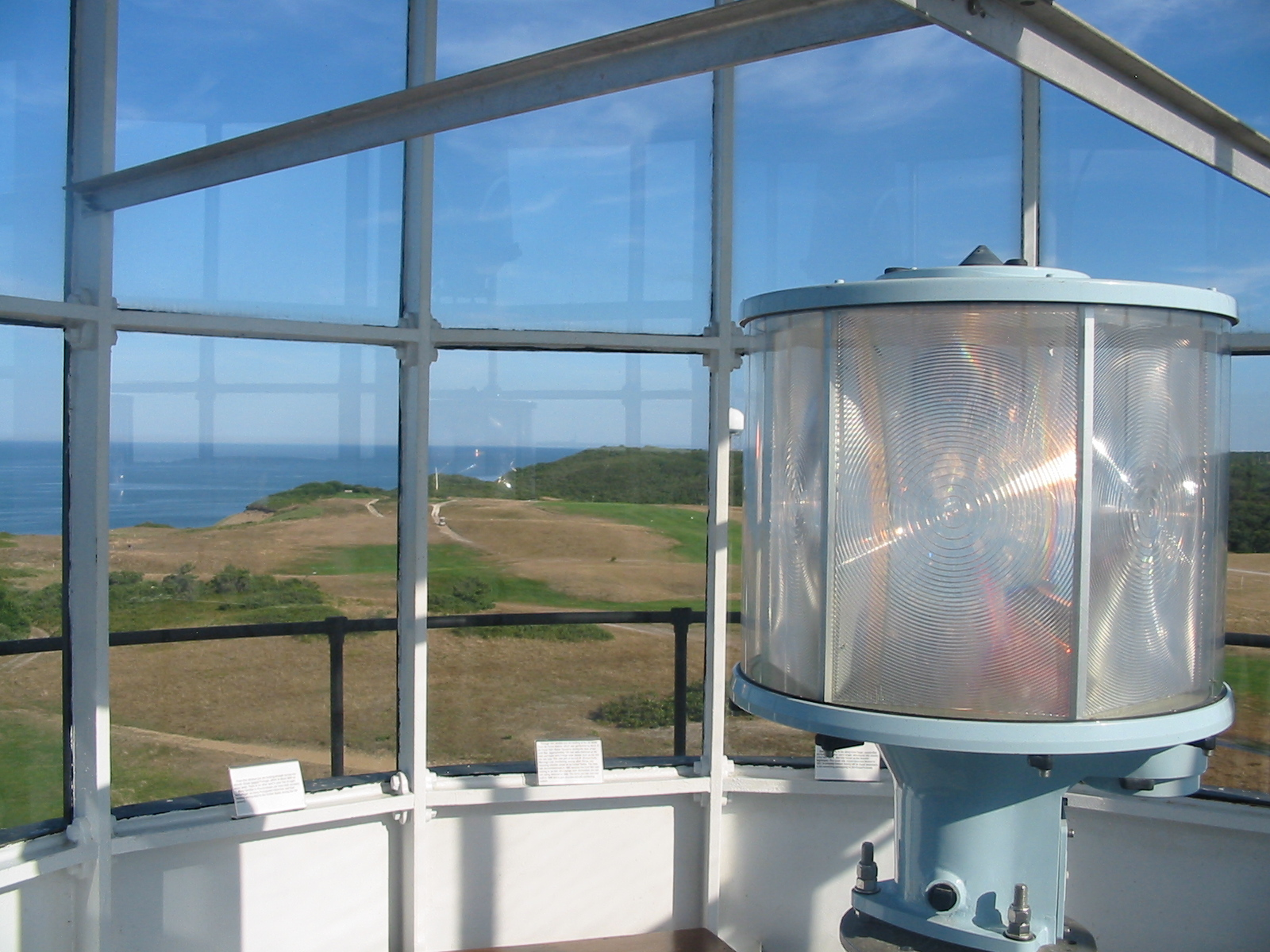
The former VRB-25 optical system

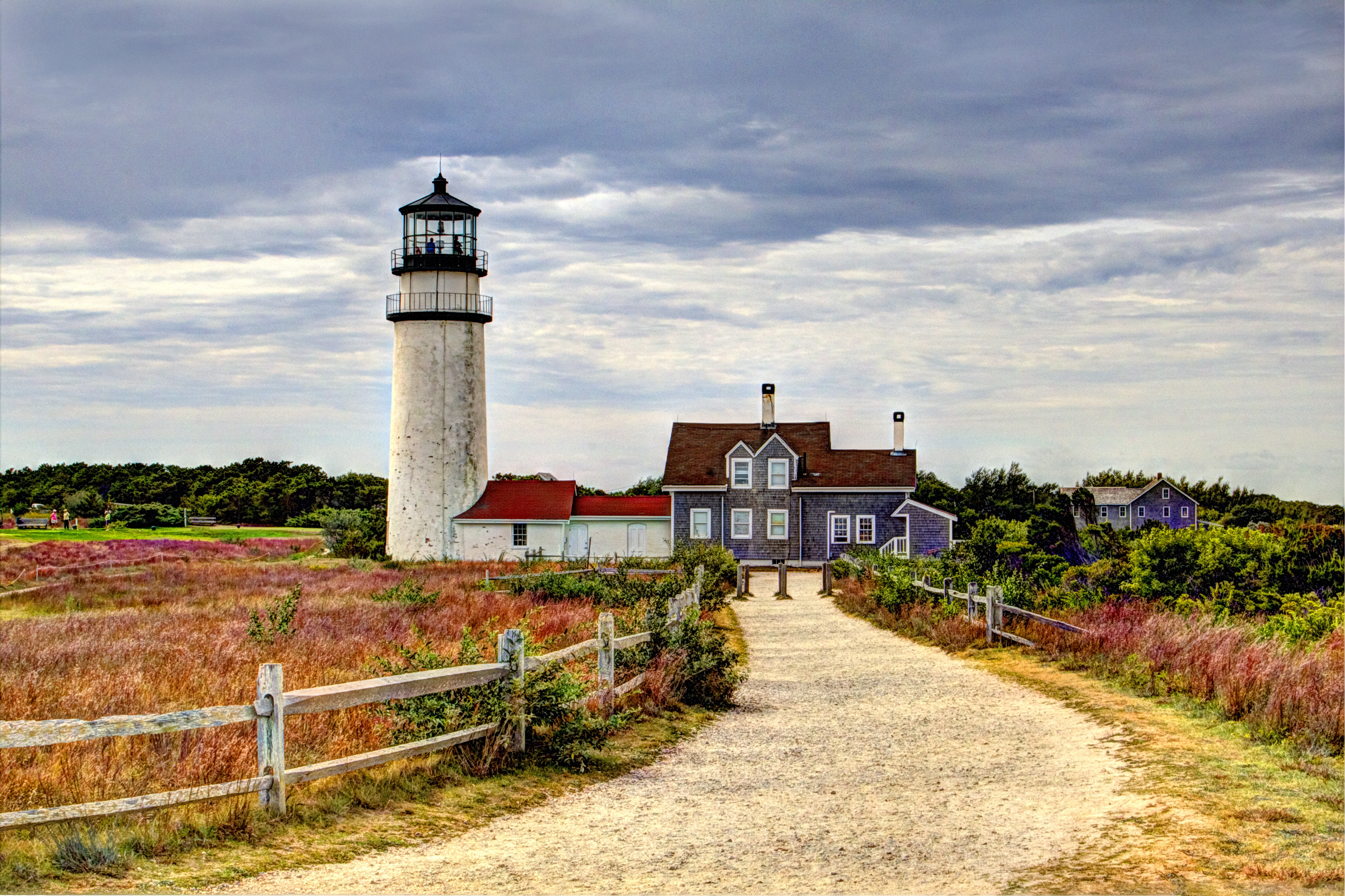
The lighthouse in September, 2014

== Highland Light in art ==
Painter Edward Hopper, who owned a summer house in Truro, painted this lighthouse in his work Highland Light, North Truro (1930). Although the light was subsequently moved, the landscape still resembles the vista painted by Hopper. The watercolor resides at the Harvard Art Museums.

== See also ==
- National Register of Historic Places listings in Barnstable County, Massachusetts
- National Register of Historic Places listings in Cape Cod National Seashore
