= Whaleback Light =

Lighthouse in Maine, US

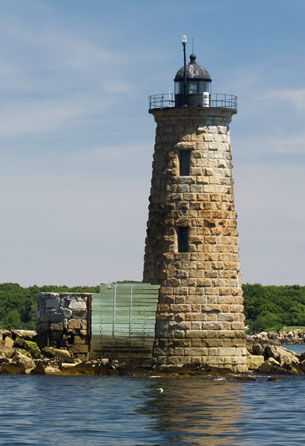
- Location: Piscataqua River entrance, Kittery, Maine
- Coordinates: 43°3′31.534″N 70°41′46.701″W

Tower
- Constructed: 1830
- Foundation: Stone / timber
- Construction: Granite blocks
- Automated: 1963
- Height: 15 m (49 ft)
- Shape: Conical
- Markings: Natural
- Heritage: National Register of Historic Places listed place
- Fog signal: HORN: 2 every 30s

Light
- First lit: 1872 (current tower)
- Focal height: 59 feet (18 m)
- Lens: Fourth order Fresnel lens, 1855 (original), VLB-44, 2009–2021, VRB-25 (Current)
- Range: 14 nautical miles (26 km; 16 mi)
- Characteristic: Grp Flash (2) White, 10s
- Whaleback Light Station
- U.S. National Register of Historic Places
- Nearest city: Kittery Point, Maine
- Area: less than one acre
- Built: 1872
- Architect: US Army Corps of Engineers
- MPS: Light Stations of Maine MPS
- NRHP reference No.: 87002278
- Added to NRHP: March 23, 1988

Whaleback Light is a historic lighthouse marking the mouth of the Piscataqua River in Kittery, Maine. It is located on a rocky outcrop offshore southwest of Fort Foster and south of Wood Island in Kittery. The present tower was built in 1872. It was listed on the National Register of Historic Places in 1988.

== History ==
The station (known in early records as "Whales Back") was established in 1830 for $20,000. The tower was upgraded in 1855 with a new lantern and a fourth order Fresnel lens. A fog bell and tower were installed in 1863. In 1869, storms had caused cracks in the tower and foundation causing a new tower to be built in 1872. This tower, still standing today, was constructed with dovetailed granite blocks alongside the original tower, which was removed in 1880. The light is 59 feet (18 m) above mean sea level, and the tower, also housed the keeper's living quarters and a storage area.

The light was automated in 1963. At some point the fog bell was replaced with a horn and in 1991, the volume of the horn was reduced because it was damaging the integrity of the structure.

In 2007, under the National Lighthouse Preservation Act of 2000, Whaleback lighthouse was made available to a suitable new steward. The American Lighthouse Foundation and its chapter Friends of Portsmouth Harbor Lighthouses submitted an application and in November 2008, became the new owners.

The light exhibits two white flashes every 10 seconds. From 2009–2021, this was produced by a modern VLB-44 LED. Due to public outcry, in 2022 the Coast Guard replaced the VLB-44 with a VRB-25, similar to what the lighthouse had used prior to 2009.

== Keepers ==
- Samuel E. Haskell (1831–1839)
- Joseph L. Locke (1839–1840)
- Zachariah Chickering (1840)
- John Kennard (1840)
- Joseph D. Currier (1841)
- Eliphalet Grover (1841–1843)
- J. Prentiss Locke (1843-unknown)
- Richard R. Lock (c. 1847)
- Jedediah Rand (1849–1853)
- Reuben T. Leavitt (1853–1859)
- Oliver P. Tucker (1859–1860)
- Gustavus A. Abbott (1860–1861)
- Joel P. Reynolds (1861–1864)
- Edward Parks (assistant, 1863–1864)
- Nathaniel P. Campbell (1864)
- Ambrose Card (assistant, then keeper 1864)
- Gilbert Amee (assistant 1864, then keeper 1864–1869)
- Mrs. M. M. Amee (assistant, 1864–1867)
- Isaac W. Chauncy (assistant, 1867–1868)
- James W. Verney (1869–1871)
- Ferdinand Barr (assistant 1868–1871, became keeper 3/22/1871)
- Emily F. Barr (assistant, 1871)
- William H. Caswell (1871–1872)
- Frank P. Caswell (assistant, 1871–1872)
- Chandler Martin (1872–1878)
- George R. Frost (assistant, 1872–1873)
- Frank L. Chauncey (assistant, 1873 and 1876–1880)
- John L. A. Martin (assistant 1874–1876)
- Leander White (1878–1887)
- John W. Lewis (assistant 1880–1882)
- Brackett Lewis (assistant 1883–1885)
- Ellison C. White (assistant 1885–1887, principal keeper 1887–1888)
- James M. Haley (1888–1893)
- Daniel Stevens (assistant 1887–1890)
- John W. Robinson (assistant 1890–1892)
- James Haley (Jr.?) (assistant 1892–1893)
- Walter S. Amee (1893–1921)
- Wallace S, Chase (assistant 1893–1894)
- Alvah J. Tobey (assistant 1894–1899)
- Joseph A. Pruett (assistant 1896–1897)
- John W. Wetzel (assistant 1897–1924)
- John P. Brooks (assistant, 1899–1915)
- Arnold B. White (1921–1941)
- W. A. Alley (c. 1935)
- Maynard F. Farnsworth (c. 1922–1940s)
- Charles U. Gardner (relief keeper, c, 1942–1943)
- Morgan W. Willis (1948–1950)
- Francis D. Hickey (Coast Guard, c. 1956–1957)
- Robert Brann (Coast Guard, c. 1957)
- Stephen H. Rogers (USCG, c. 1957–1958)
- James Pope (Coast Guard, c. early 1960s)

== Gallery ==
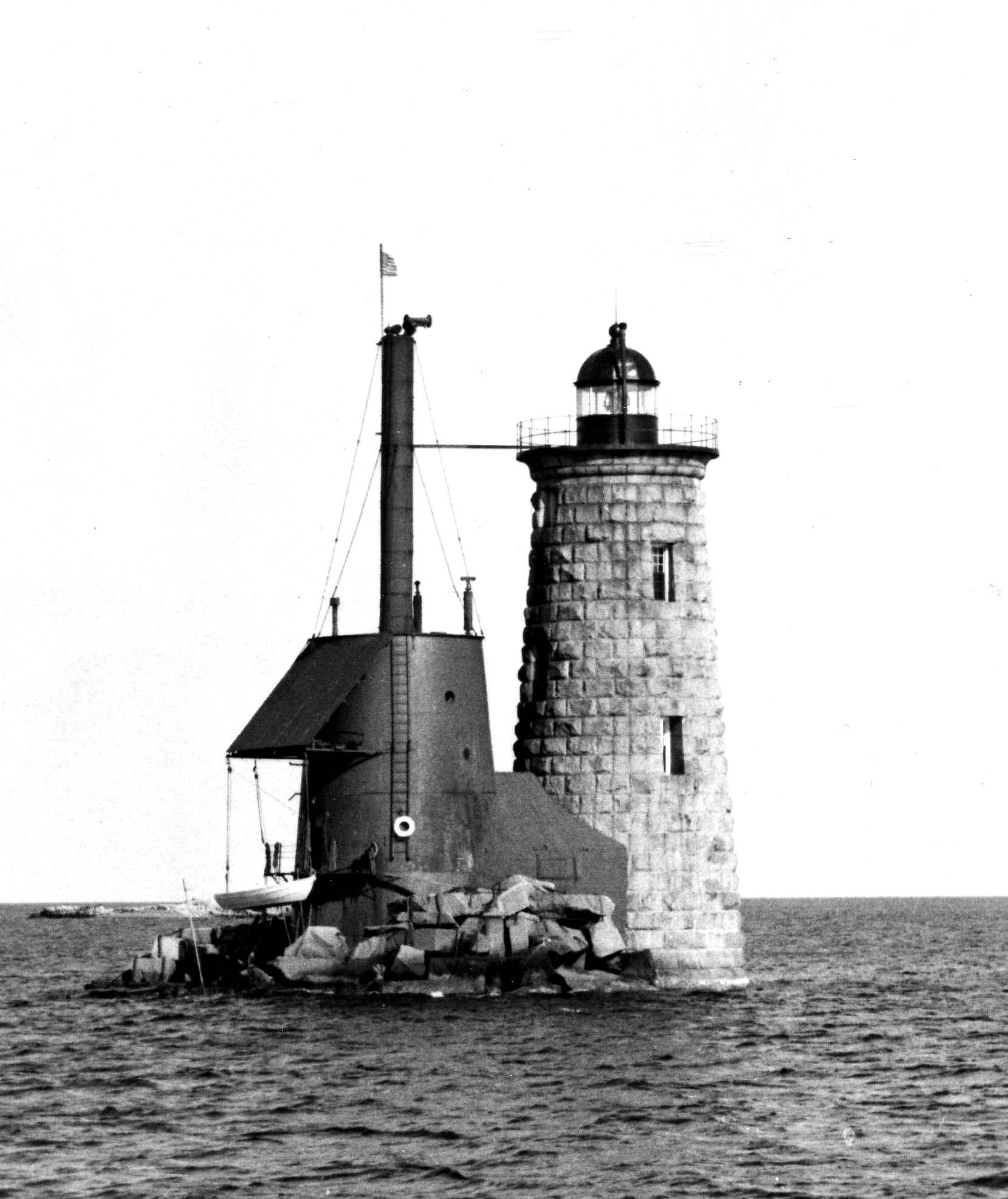
USCG photo circa 1950

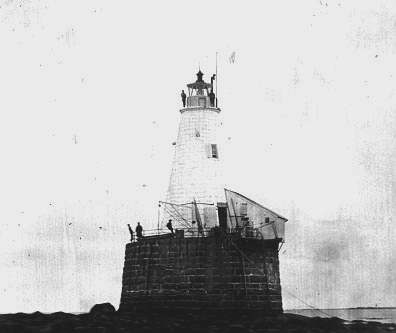
The original 1829 tower circa 1847.

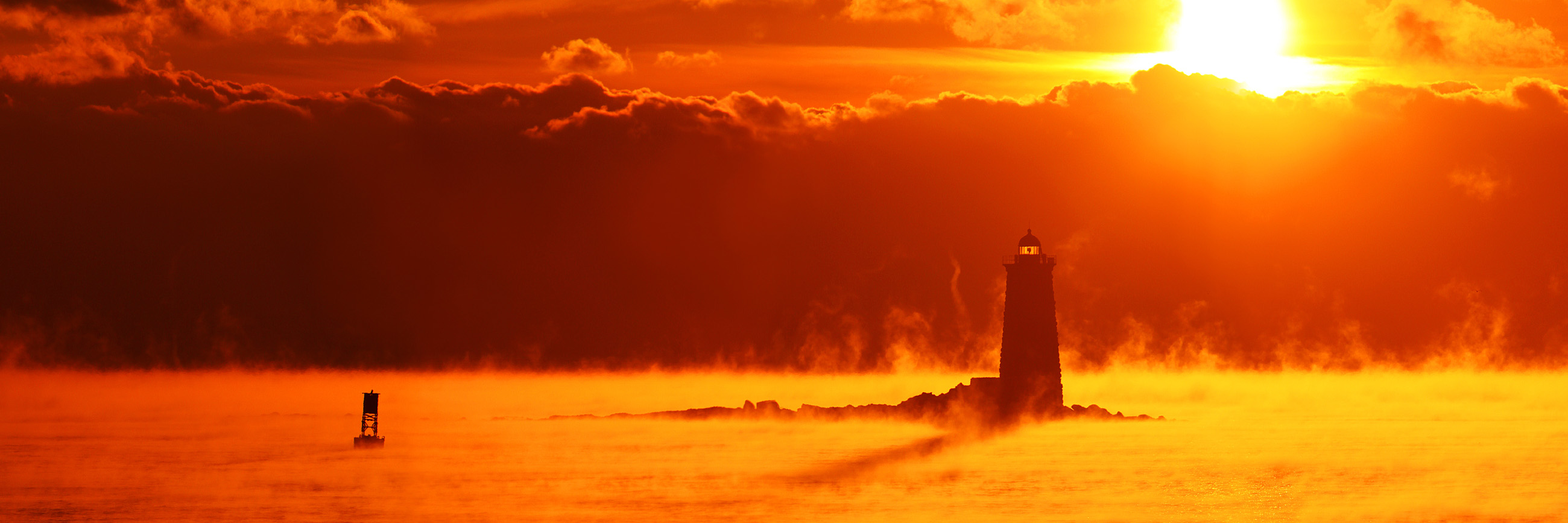
Whaleback Light circa 2009 - winter sunrise

== See also ==
- National Register of Historic Places listings in York County, Maine
