= Dutch Island Light =

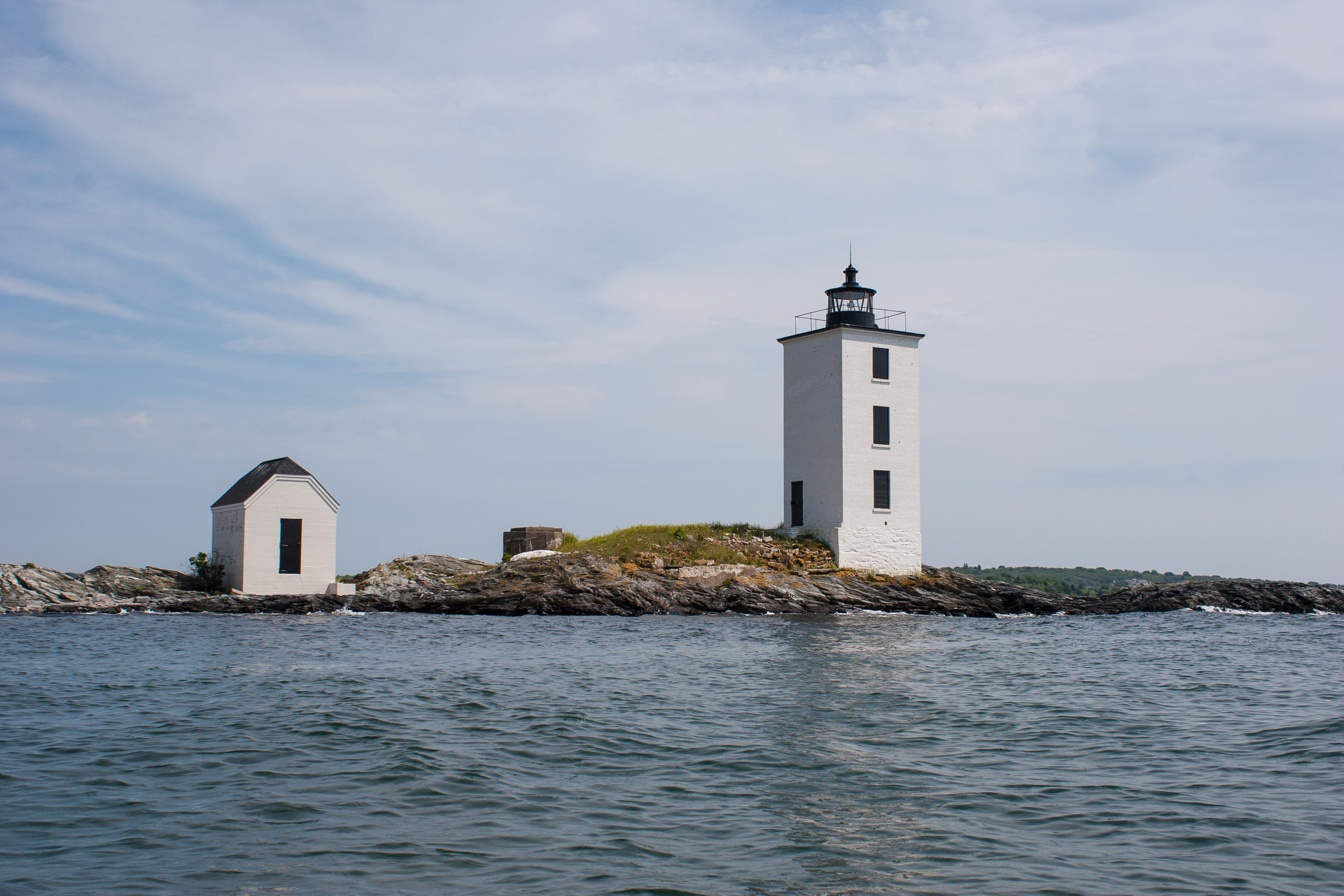
- Dutch Island light in 2009, viewed from a kayak
- Location: Jamestown, Rhode Island
- Coordinates: 41°29′48.27″N 71°24′15.35″W

Tower
- Constructed: 1826
- Foundation: Surface rock
- Construction: Brick
- Automated: 1947
- Height: 13 m (43 ft)
- Shape: Square
- Markings: White with black lantern
- Heritage: National Register of Historic Places listed place
- Fog signal: none

Light
- First lit: 1857
- Deactivated: 1979 - 2007
- Focal height: 56 feet (17 m)
- Lens: 4th order Fresnel lens (original), 9.8 inches (250 mm) (current)
- Characteristic: Flashing red 6 seconds
- Dutch Island Lighthouse
- U.S. National Register of Historic Places
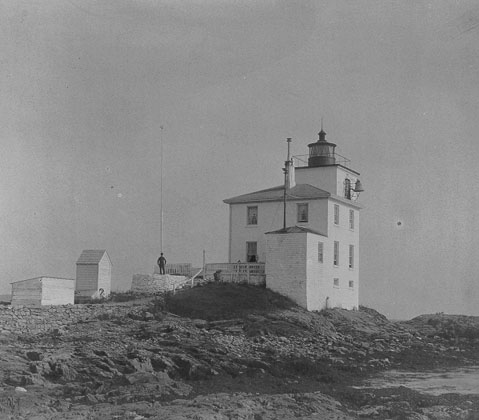
- Built: 1857
- MPS: Lighthouses of Rhode Island TR
- NRHP reference No.: 87001701
- Added to NRHP: February 25, 1988

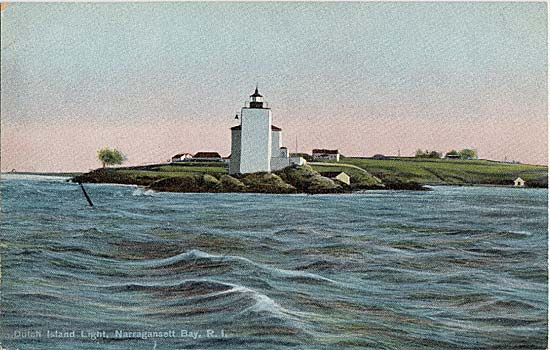
Dutch Island Light postcard

Dutch Island Light is a historic lighthouse on Dutch Island off Jamestown, Rhode Island.

In 1825 the federal government acquired 6 acres (2.4 ha) at the southern end of the island, and on January 1, 1827, Dutch Island Light was established to mark the west passage of Narragansett Bay and to aid vessels entering Dutch Island Harbor. The first 30-foot (9.1 m) tower was built of stones found on the island. The government constructed a new 42-foot (13 m) brick tower in 1857 with a fog bell added in 1878.

== Additional history ==
Dutch Island is located in the West Passage of Narragansett Bay between Jamestown and Saunderstown, Rhode Island. Originally it was called "Quetenis" by the Narragansett people, who sold it to the Dutch West India Company about 1636. The Dutch from New Amsterdam (later New York) used the island as a safe place to trade their goods to the Narragansett for meat, fish and furs. Later the English settlers of Rhode Island used the island to graze sheep.

For many years it was fortified to protect the West Passage from sea invasion. It is not known whether this included the Revolutionary War era when the Conanicut Battery was activated further south on the western shore of Conanicut (Jamestown) Island. Dutch Island was later heavily fortified with massive concrete gun emplacements. These were started with large granite store structures near the southern end of the island during the Civil War. In the late 19th century there was a battery of 15-inch (380 mm) Rodman guns (25-ton cannon which used a 50-pound charge of black powder to fire a 300-pound cannonball as far as 3 miles (4.8 km)) on the point at the southern end of the island.

In the late 1890s the Army established Fort Greble on Dutch Island. Fort Greble was an Endicott-era coastal fortification which featured long-range rifled artillery pieces and could house as many as 495 officers and men. Fort Greble was an active post until 1924 and was used for National Guard training up to World War II.

In 1825, the U.S. government bought 6 acres (24,000 m^{2}) on the southern tip of the island with the purpose of establishing a "light station". The first tower was built in 1826 using native stone from the island. It was 30 feet (9.1 m) tall. One of the first keepers was Robert Dennis, whose father had fought in the Revolution and who was also present at the Boston Tea Party. Dennis was 78 years old when he became keeper and apparently remained keeper until he was well into his nineties. His son, Robert, took his position when his father died.

According to Jeremy D'Entremont, a member of the American Lighthouse Foundation and the first Board of Directors of the Dutch Island Lighthouse Society, the lighthouse and keeper's house were described in the mid-19th century as "the worst construction of any in the state", and the lantern was described as "wretched".

In 1857, the old tower and the Keeper's House were demolished and replaced by the present 42-foot (13 m) brick tower and a four-room Keeper's House. The basic structure of this tower was described in 2007 as still being "very sound". The cost of these two structures in the 1850s was $4,000, and included a "fourth-order" Fresnel lens and a fixed white light. In 1878, a fog bell was installed on the west side of the tower to be activated by a clockwork mechanism.

In 1924, a flashing red kerosene light was installed, the lens for which was rotated by "…a very big weight on pulleys", recalls a local resident.

Keepers:

- William Dennis (1827–1843)
- Robert H. Weeden (1843–1844)
- William P. Babcock (1844–1846)
- Robert Dennis (1846–1853)
- Benjamin Congdon (1853–1859)
- M. M. Trundy (1859–1865)
- Lewis T. King (Nov. 24, 1885 to Sept. 20, 1901)

John Paul was one of the last keepers (1929–1931), and his son Louis remembered that this father kept a vegetable garden and a flock of ducks. He said that the fishing off the rocks was "excellent" and that his father would catch "…a bushel of blackfish before breakfast." He would buy a whole side of beef in Jamestown or Saunderstown, salt it thoroughly and keep it for prolonged use.

In 1947, the light was automated and lit by electricity, as a flashing red beacon. The military left the island, and in 1950 the Keeper's House was demolished because of vandalism and because toadstools and moss were growing in the house.

In 1972, the Coast Guard proposed discontinuing the light altogether. This was followed by at least 40-50 letters of protest written to the Rhode Island Department of Natural Resources and to the Coast Guard. As a result, the Coast Guard not only retained the light but even increased its intensity. Extensive vandalism, however, continued and again the proposition to discontinue the light was made in 1977. This time it was discontinued and was replaced by a flashing red buoy off the tip of the island in 1979.

== Dutch Island Lighthouse Society is formed ==
The Dutch Island Lighthouse Society was born in 2000 as a Chapter of the American Lighthouse Foundation and with the objective of restoring the lighthouse and hopefully a functioning light.

In May 2000, the lighthouse was visited by Dave Lombardi, Keith Fornal, Jeremy D'Entremont and Chris Powell of the Rhode Island Department of Environmental Management (which had jurisdiction over the island). In June 2000, Ginger Hesse and Roberta Randall of the Rhode Island State Historic Preservation Office also visited the lighthouse. The building, though needing extensive repairs, was found to be basically very sound, and they named it an Historic Building.

In the summer of 2001, DILS filed an application for funds for restoration and reactivation with an estimated cost of $120,000, and the application was "accepted". It took another 7 years to complete all the many details of design, planning, restoration and activation along with endless encounters with "red tape". Meanwhile, a set of by-laws was approved which established a board of directors.

In January 2004, DILS was accepted as a non-profit organization in the state of Rhode Island. The DILS treasurer, Betty Aschman, reported that there was $16,000 from "big donors" including the Kimball Foundation, BankNewport's Community Fund, and several family foundations. There were 188 "small" donors, and on May 21, 2004, Al Potter reported that the Society had an easement agreement with the state and the necessary insurance and project agreement. On July 1, 2004, the visitors to the island included key people from the Rhode Island Department of Transportation and Keith Lescarbeau, who was the president and owner of the Abcore Restoration Company that was already at work on Plum Beach Light.

By the spring of 2005, DILS negotiated a long-term lease from the DEM, which was in charge of the island for the state, including the lighthouse. In July of that year, engineering firm Vanasse Hangen and Brustlin (VHB) visited the lighthouse with Bill DeSantis of RIDOT, architect Richard Ventrone, Jr., and planner Arnold Robinson of the Newport Collaborative Architects. (Campbell Construction Co. had already had a site visit). Their charge was to come up with drawings and specifications that would get the job done and relight the light, and if possible, to stay within the $120,000 grant from RIDOT.

The details of their specifications had to be cleared by the DILS Building Committee, RIDOT, the town of Jamestown, the US Coast Guard and RIDEM (Parks Department) before the Society could advertise for bids. After a short time, RIDOT gave DILS permission to advertise for bids; the Building Committee reviewed the four bids. The winning bidder was Abcore Restoration of Narragansett, which had a very good reputation and had recently completed the restoration of the Plum Beach Lighthouse, also in Narragansett Bay. Keith Lescarbeau, the president and owner of Abcore, was also well known and admired in the area. The Building Committee's choice of Abcore was approved by the Board of Directors, and on July 3, 2007, Craig Amerigian agreed to serve as the DILS Project Manager and Owner Representative.

Abcore started July 25. They made a temporary landing area on the rock near the lighthouse of about 20 tires tied together and built a plywood walkway from this landing area to the lighthouse. They had a small launch with a hoist which transported all the scaffolding, ladders and supplies to the island from Jamestown. It was heartening to see the scaffolding in place and to watch the exterior gradually change from mottled brown to gleaming white with the final parging.

Another detail in the rebuilding was the fabrication and testing of a solar-powered workable light, as well as chipping away all loose material on the exterior of the tower, repairing with tuck pointing, coating with a parging (tested in Newport for appropriate whiteness) and then coating with an antifungal material. The roof had to be replaced. The glass in the tower had to be replaced with double glazing. The brass window frames needed repair and replacement, and much of the walkway also needed repair and replacement. Considerable work had to be done to the inside staircase, wooden window boards were replaced with metal ones, and the door was replaced.

The separate small "oil house" was cleaned out and fitted with a new roof and door, and the exterior was refinished.

The grant from RIDOT specifically stated that the grant money could not be used for maintenance, nor would RIDOT or the Enhancement Program pay for maintenance. The final field report was received from the Newport Collaborative Architects on November 20, 2007.

On November 17, 2007, many gathered at vantage points to see the great occasion. At the appointed time (7:00 p.m.) the "count-down" was started, the cannon fired, and founding member Shirley Sheldon pushed the button, and for the first time in 28 years Dutch Island had a flashing red light and a gleaming white lighthouse.

== Gallery ==
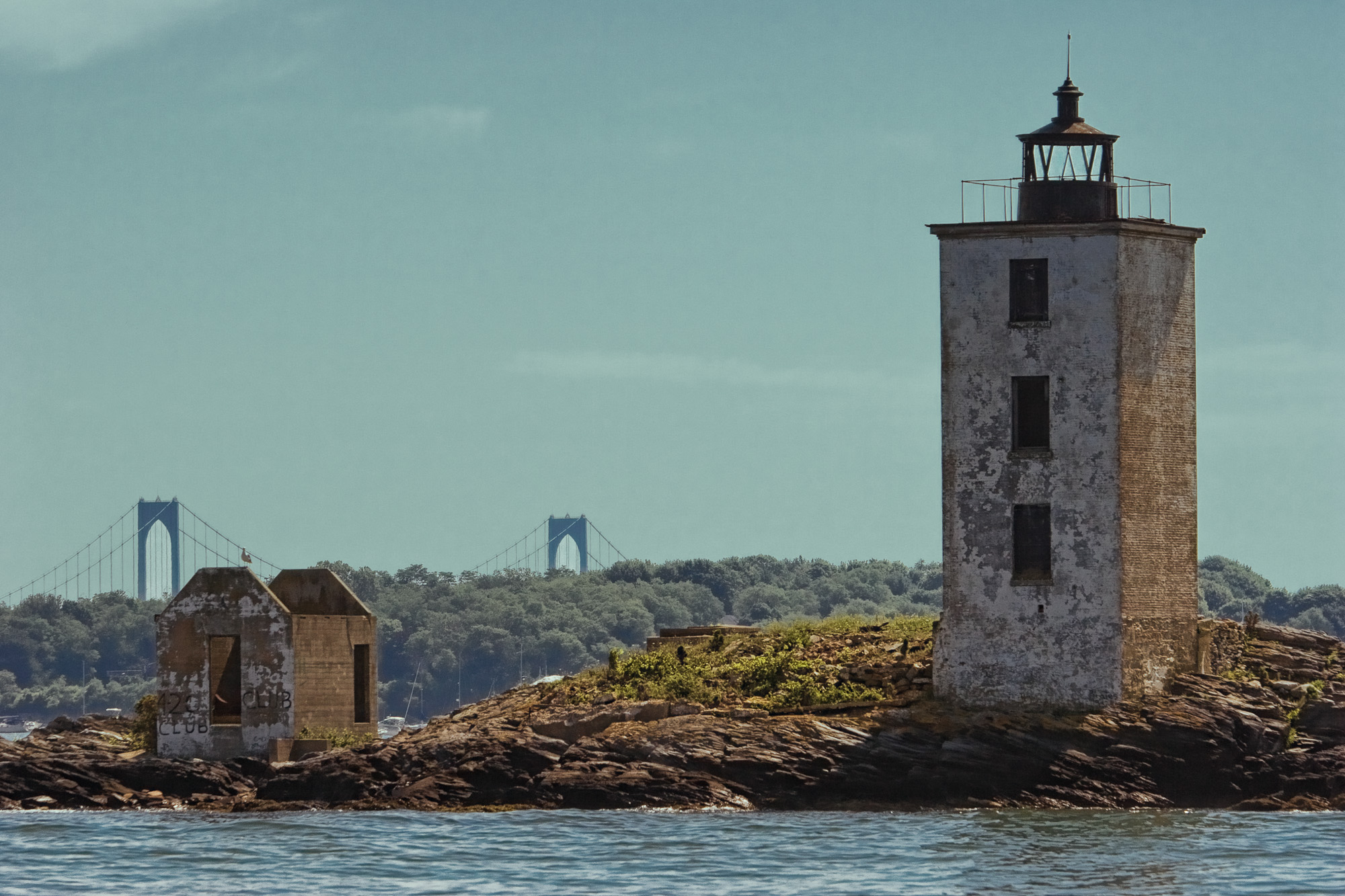
West side just before renovation, July 2007

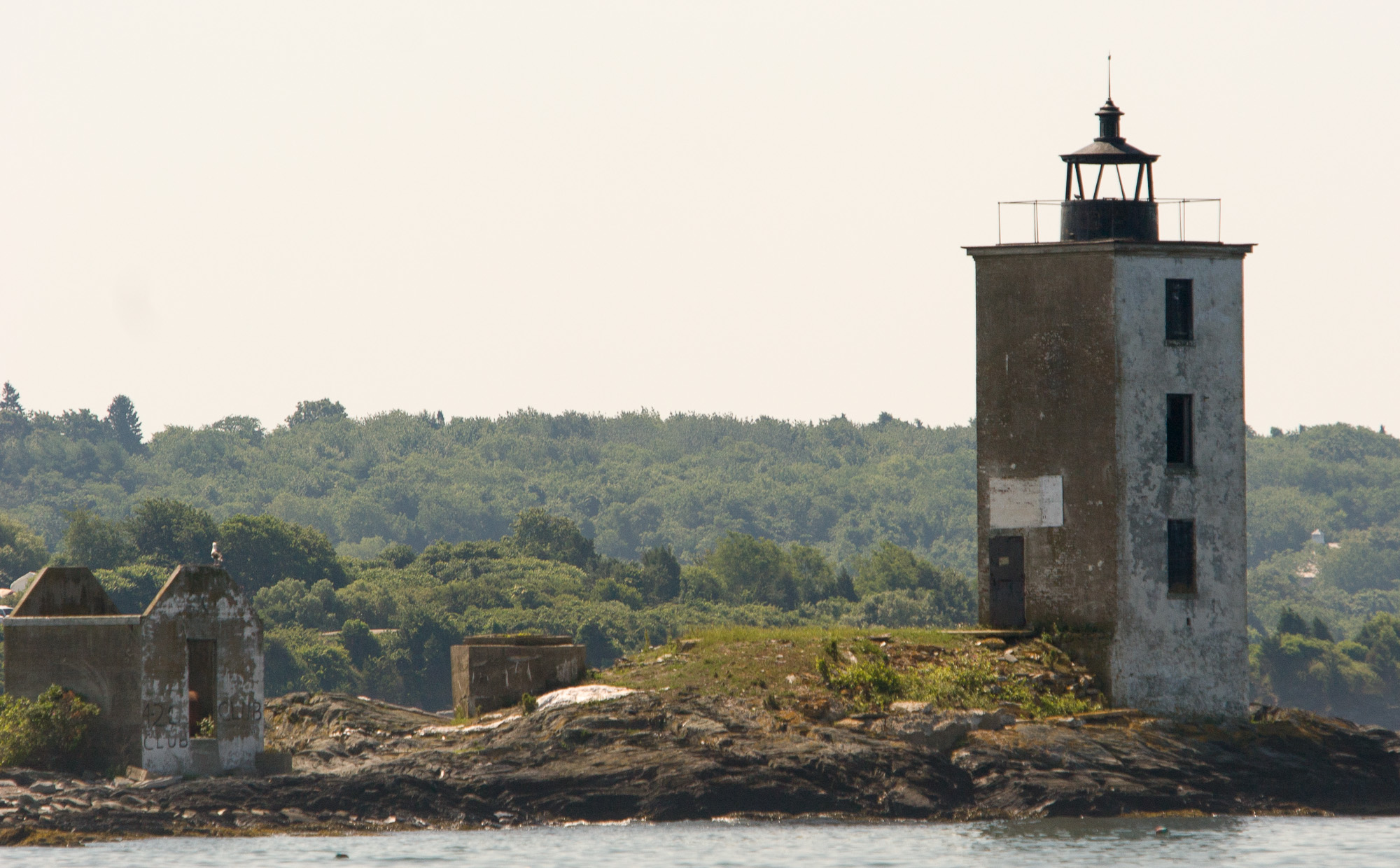
West side just before renovation, July 2007

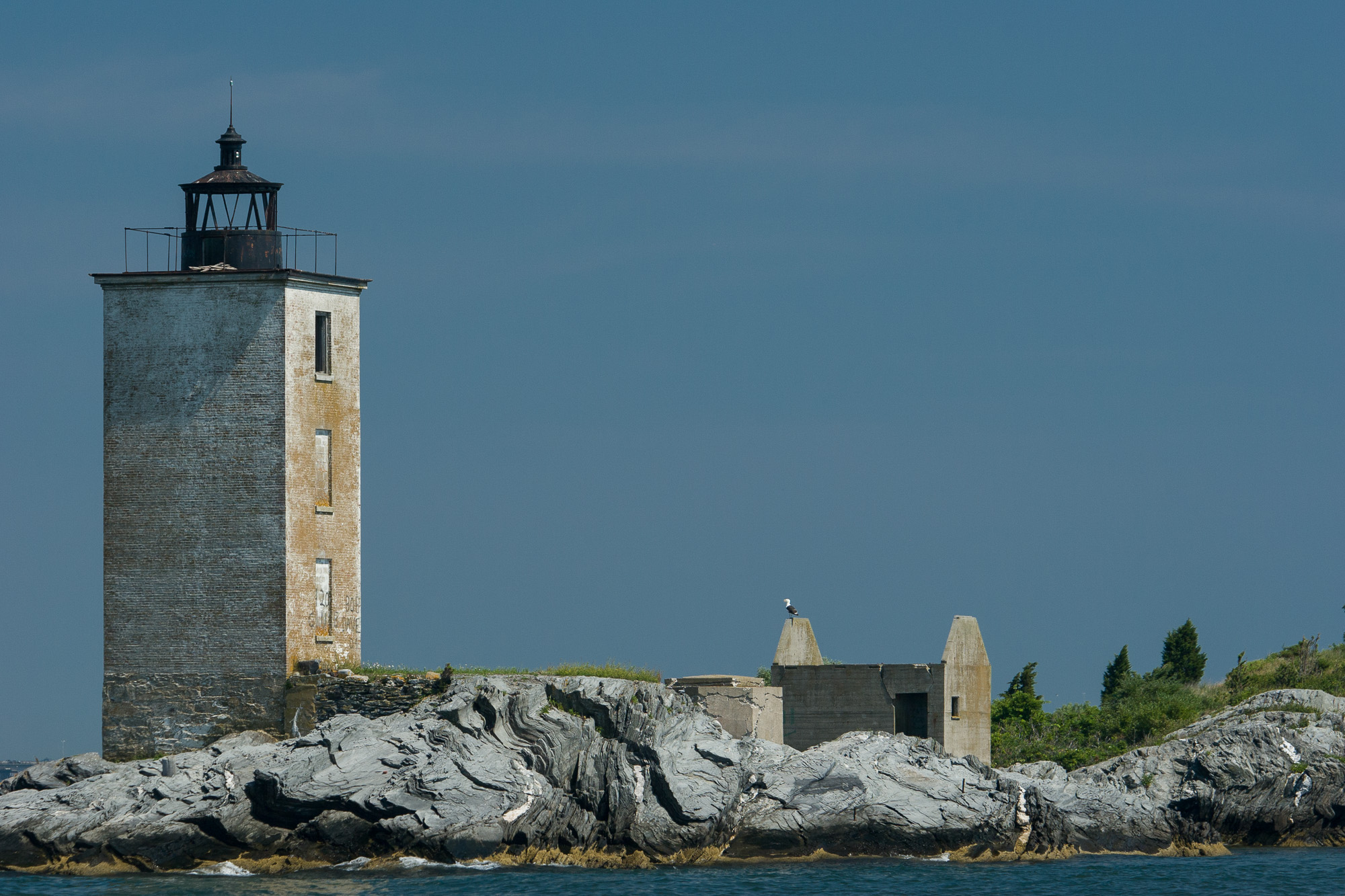
East side, just before renovation, July 2007

== See also ==
- National Register of Historic Places listings in Newport County, Rhode Island
