= VRB-25 =

Lighthouse lighting system

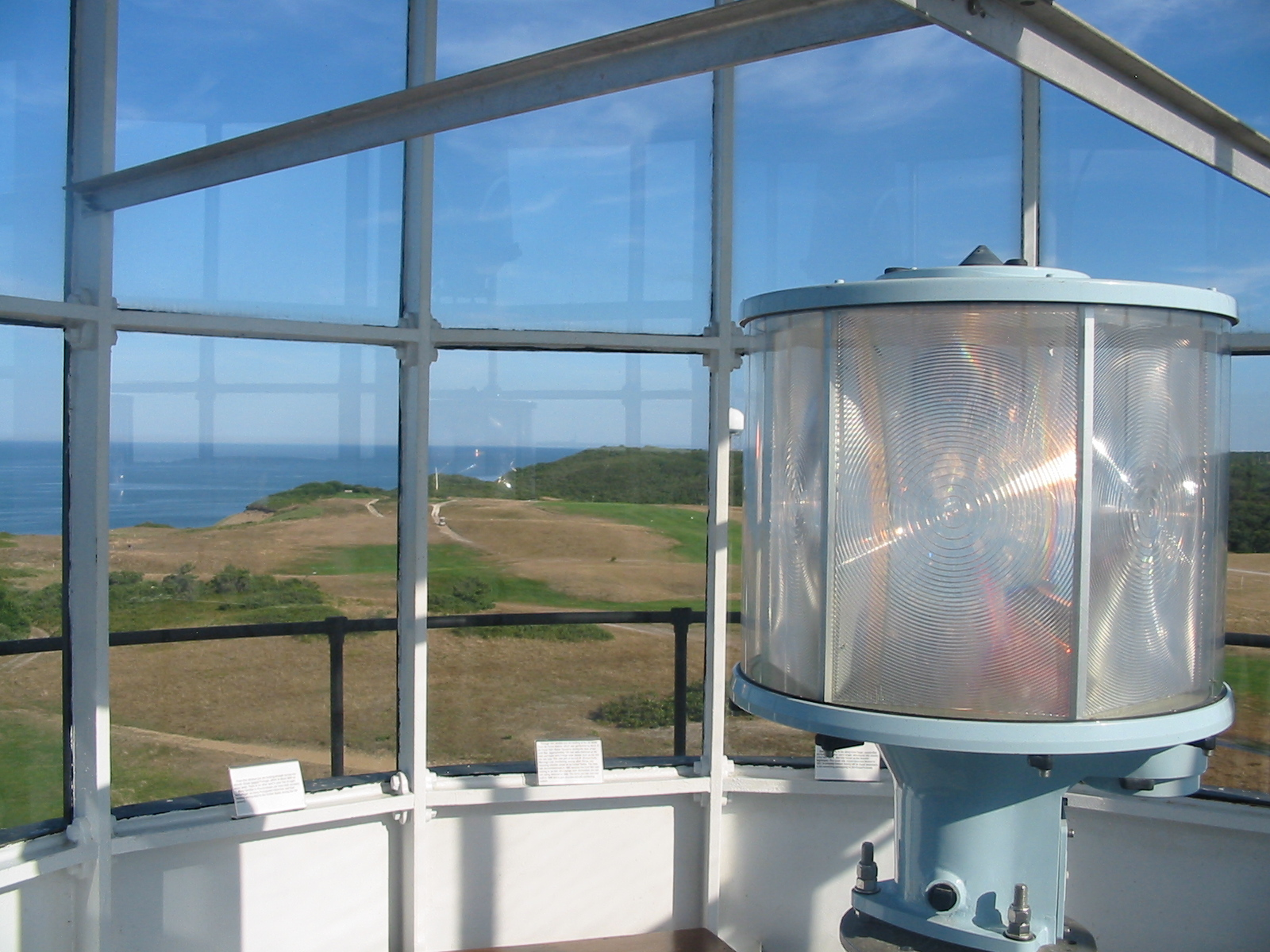
A VRB-25 at Highland Light

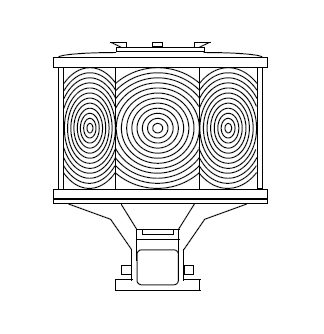
Side view of a six-lens VRB-25. For outdoor use, bird spikes are added to the top

The VRB-25 is a lighthouse optical system designed and built by Vega Industries Ltd. in Porirua, New Zealand. It was originally designed in 1993–95 with the assistance of the United States Coast Guard to meet USCG requirements for a robust mechanism requiring minimum maintenance. It has become the Coast Guard's standard 12 volt rotating beacon. The company's literature says there are more than 400 installations worldwide. More than a quarter of the active lighthouses in Maine have one installed.

== Components ==
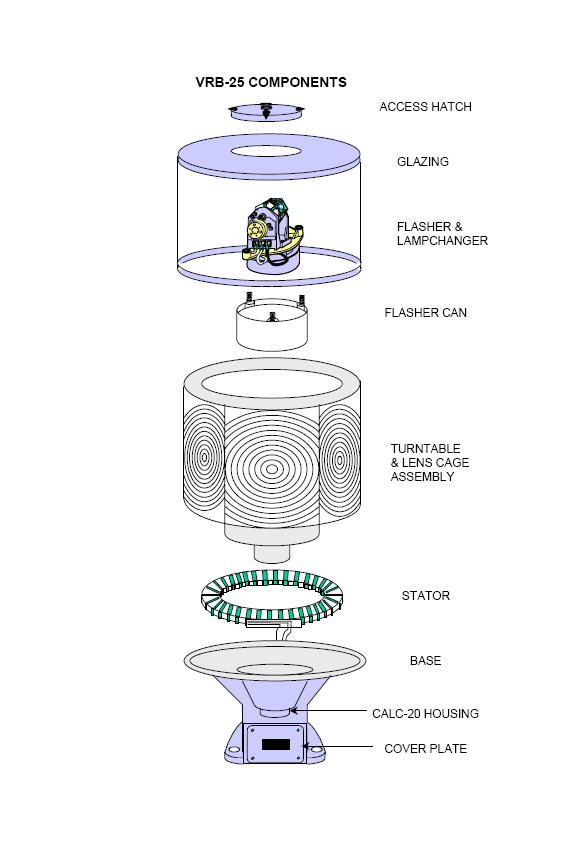
Exploded view

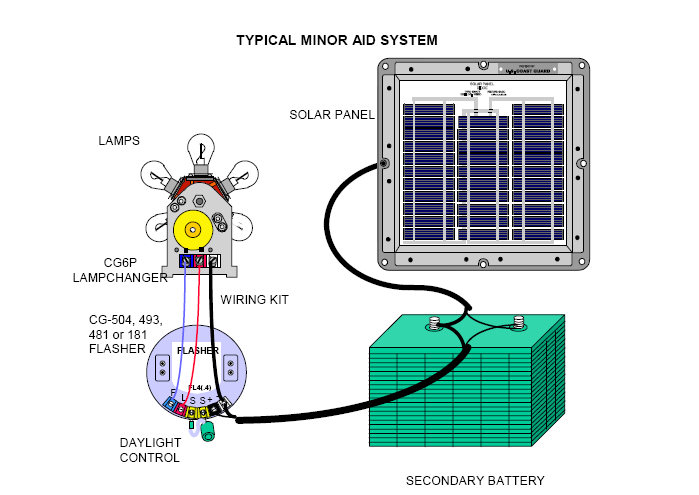
Typical electrical system, showing the lamp changer

A microprocessor controlled 12 volt DC motor drives an array of six or eight acrylic Fresnel lenses around a bulb at one of 248 speeds ranging from 0.5 to 15.9 revolutions per minute (RPM). In the simplest case, all six lenses are used, so that for Boon Island Light, which shows one flash every five seconds, the mechanism rotates at two RPM. Eight lenses are used only when required to achieve more complex characteristics.

Maximum range is achieved by using the slowest possible speed, but for grouped flashes, it is necessary to blank off lenses and rotate the mechanism faster. So, for example, for The Cuckolds Light, whose characteristic is group flashing two every six seconds, all but two of the six panels are blanked off and the mechanism rotates at ten RPM.

The mechanism is driven by a DC thirty-pole three phase brushless direct drive motor which consumes approximately 1.5 watts. The microprocessor controller keeps the motor speed within 2% of that chosen, using optical sensing of a circular pattern of alternating black and silver lines located around the bottom of the turntable. This provides a feedback signal for speed control. The unit is designed to accept voltages ranging from 11 to 30 volts. Since the life of an incandescent lamp decreases dramatically as the applied voltage increases, the lamp voltage is carefully maintained at 12.00V using pulse-width modulation.

The lamps, standard marine signal lamps which may be from 10 to 100 watts as required to produce the necessary range, typically have a life of 2,000 hours. The unit contains a bulb changing mechanism which holds six bulbs, so that a unit could go approximately three years between maintenance visits to change bulbs. The acrylic lenses and cylinder surrounding the whole mechanism are designed to be UV resistant, but still require replacement approximately every five years. In practice, since working lights are critical to navigation, the Coast Guard actually services lights more frequently. Except for that maintenance, the unit is expected to last twenty years.

== Predecessors and successors ==
In the 2010s, LED lamps began replacing incandescent lamps in lighthouse applications, so it seems likely the twenty year replacement will use an LED light source. In fact, several VLB-44 LED beacons, also made by Vega Industries, have been installed by the USCG at several locations, including White Island Light and Wood Island Light. In at least one case, a VLB-44 was removed and returned to a VRB-25 in 2022 at Whaleback Light to maintain the rotating light signature.

From the first use of lighthouses with flashing lights, the light source has been continuous, because turning a flame on and off is impractical and flashing an incandescent electric lamp reduces its life substantially. The flashing light signature seen by the observer has been achieved by rotating a lens system. Since LEDs can be flashed on and off without degrading their lives, it is likely the VRB-25 is the last use of rotating beacons in lighthouses.

== Issues ==
Although the units have been successful in their adoption, there has been occasional controversy (at Egg Rock Light in Maine, for example) when the Coast Guard has removed the lantern from the tower after installing a VRB-25. This seemed logical since the lantern required maintenance and the VRB-25 is designed to sit outside, but it changed the traditional look of the towers. After public protest, a replacement lantern house was installed at Egg Rock Light in 1986. All the VRB-25s listed below, except Piedras Blancas, still have lanterns.

While the beam is visible at its listed range, it is a more focused beam than that produced by a glass Fresnel lens. Some navigators don't like this, finding it harder to see under some conditions. It is easy to see the difference from many points around Boston Harbor, where the VRB-25 at The Graves Light and the 2nd order glass Fresnel lens at Boston Light are both visible. Of course, the original first order Fresnel lens at The Graves stood twelve feet high and weighed several tons. Its many pieces of glass required periodic careful cleaning and alignment.

== Examples of lights using the VRB-25 ==
Light	Location	Characteristic	Range (nautical miles)
Cape Moreton Light	Queensland; Australia	Fl(4) W 20s	15
DeTour Reef Light	Chippewa County; United States	Fl W 10s	16 (white), 13 (red)
The Graves Light	Boston; United States	Fl(2) W 12s	15
Mount Desert Light	Frenchboro; United States	Fl W 15s	20
Piedras Blancas Light Station	San Simeon; United States	Fl W 10s	21
Thimble Shoal Light	Norfolk; United States	Fl W 10s	18
West Point Light	Seattle; United States	Alt WR 10s	16 (white), 13 (red)
