= Downeaster (train) =

Amtrak service between Boston, Massachusetts, and Brunswick, Maine

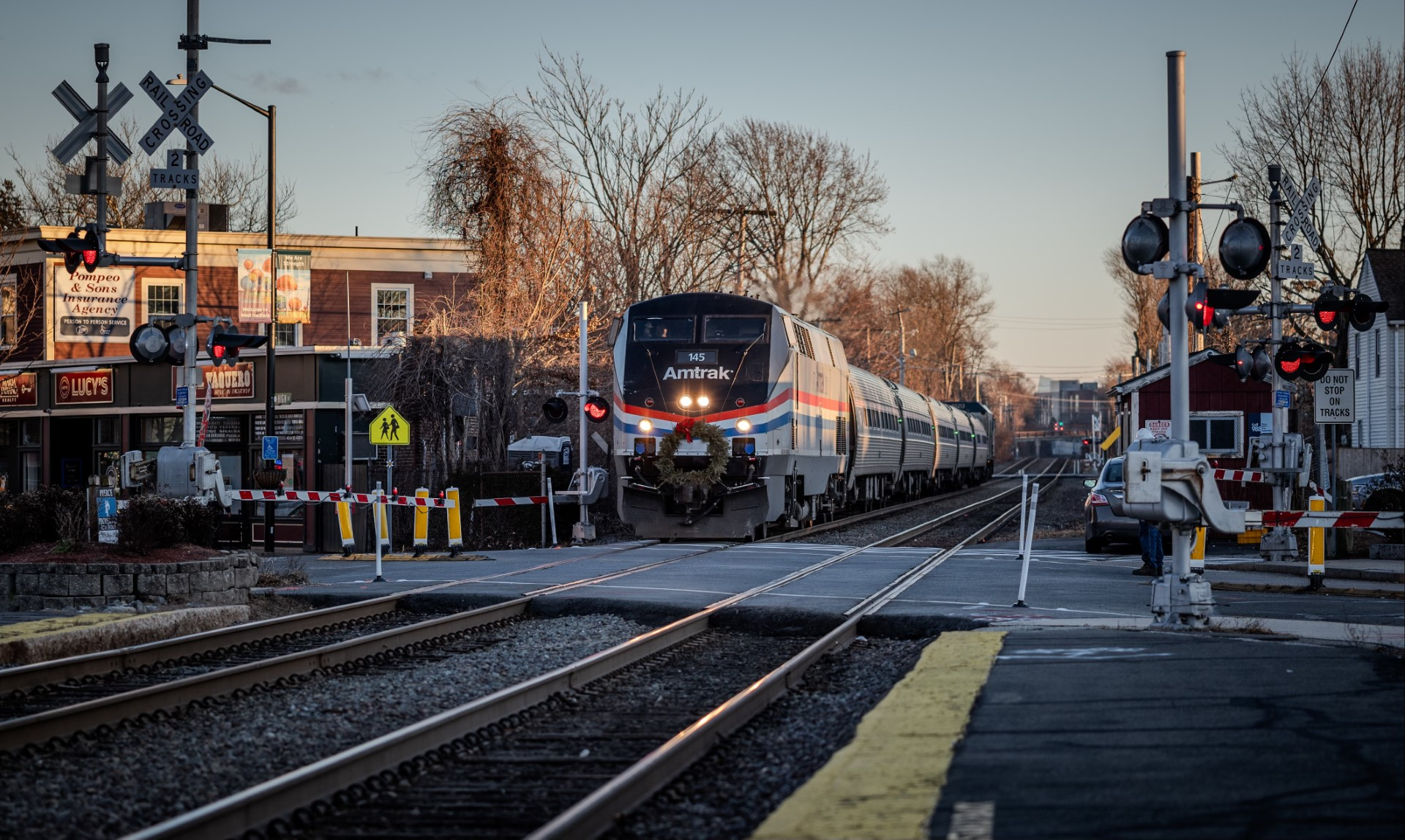
- Downeaster at the West Medford station, January 2024

Overview
- Service type: Inter-city rail
- Locale: New England
- First service: December 15, 2001
- Current operator: Amtrak in partnership with NNEPRA
- Annual ridership: 549,120 (FY 25) ▼ -7.2% (Note: Amtrak's Fiscal Year (FY) runs from October 1 of the prior year to September 30 of the named year.)
- Website: amtrakdowneaster.com

Route
- Termini: Boston North, Massachusetts; Brunswick, Maine
- Stops: 12
- Distance travelled: 145 miles (233 km)
- Average journey time: 3 hours, 20 minutes
- Service frequency: Five daily round trips
- Train numbers: 680–689 (weekdays); 690–699 (weekends)

On-board services
- Classes: Coach Class; Business Class
- Disabled access: All cars, all stations
- Catering facilities: Café
- Baggage facilities: Overhead racks

Technical
- Rolling stock: Amfleet cars GE Genesis locomotives
- Track gauge: 4 ft 8 1/2 in (1,435 mm) standard gauge
- Operating speed: 44 mph (71 km/h) (avg.); 79 mph (127 km/h) (top)
- Track owners: MBTA, CSX

The Downeaster is a 145-mile (233 km) passenger train service operated by Amtrak and managed by the Northern New England Passenger Rail Authority (NNEPRA), an agency of the state of Maine. Named for the Down East region of Maine, the train operates five daily round trips between North Station in Boston, Massachusetts, and Brunswick, Maine, with ten intermediate stops.

In fiscal 2024, the Downeaster carried 598,426 passengers, up 27.0% from the previous year. It earned ticket revenue of $13,051,548, up from $10,420,681, for a farebox recovery ratio of 50%.

== History ==
=== Previous service ===
The Downeaster follows the route historically used by the Pine Tree and Flying Yankee trains that traveled from Bangor to Boston and were operated jointly by the Boston & Maine Railroad and Maine Central Railroad. Passenger operations between Portland and Boston ceased in 1965.

=== Service resumption ===
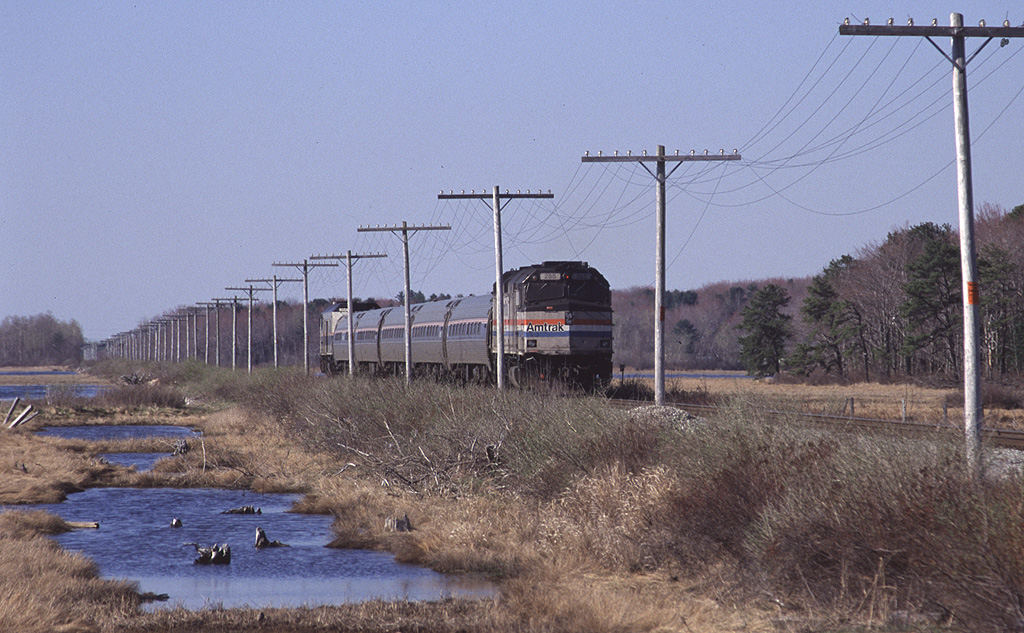
A Downeaster train travelling through Scarborough Marsh in 2002

In 1989, a group of volunteers founded TrainRiders/Northeast, a non-profit organization dedicated to bringing modern passenger rail service to Northern New England.

In 1990, at the urging of Maine's congressional delegation, Amtrak estimated the cost of creating passenger rail service at about $50 million: $30 million for infrastructure improvements and another $20 million for equipment.

The following year, Amtrak agreed to provide the equipment at no charge to the State of Maine. Earlier in that same year, the Maine Legislature adopted its first citizen-initiated bill, the "Passenger Rail Service Act", which was endorsed by the Maine DOT and signed by the governor. In 1992, Maine voters approved a $5.4 million rail bond for right-of-way improvements, and $60,000 was granted to the Maine DOT to design a Portland intermodal terminal. Later that year, Congress approved $25.5 million for more right-of-way improvements, and 1993 saw an additional $9.5 million in track improvements. By the end of 1994, total appropriations for infrastructure had reached $38.6 million.

In 1995, Governor Angus King and Commissioner of Transportation John Melrose ordered the creation of a passenger rail authority. TrainRiders/Northeast, led by Chairman Wayne Davis, worked with the state Chamber of Commerce and industry, Maine DOT, and others to convince the legislature to create the Northern New England Passenger Rail Authority in August.

Service was initially expected to start in the 1990s. Negotiations between NNEPRA, Amtrak, and Guilford Industries (now Pan Am Railways) began in 1996, but began to fail over many factors, including equipment weight and speed limits. In December 1998, a speed limit of 80 miles per hour (130 km/h) was agreed upon; the following year, the Federal Surface Transportation Board approved a limit of 79 miles per hour (127 km/h). Most right-of-way improvements were complete in 2000, but the following year, start-up was delayed again when Guilford refused to allow Amtrak to test track modulus or run trains faster than 59 miles per hour (95 km/h). The Downeaster made its first run on December 15, 2001.

=== Service improvements ===
Amtrak and NNEPRA won their protracted legal battle to operate trains at 79 miles per hour (127 km/h) after Guilford's appeal was dismissed in 2004. In August 2007, top speeds were increased from 60 miles per hour (97 km/h) to 79 miles per hour (127 km/h), cutting 20 minutes from trips between Portland and Boston. The first expansion of Downeaster service came that month, when the improvements made it possible to increase from four to five daily round trips from Portland to Boston. Amtrak plans to eventually add one or two round trips between Portland and Boston, bringing the daily total to six or seven. In 2009, NNEPRA unsuccessfully applied for federal stimulus money to increase train speeds—enough to cut 10 to 12 minutes off travel time—and increase the number of daily round trips from five to seven.

In 2011, the Downeaster became the first Amtrak train to offer free Wi-Fi service and e-ticketing.

In May 2014, NNEPRA agreed to add a station stop in Kennebunk, Maine. Like Old Orchard Beach, it would have been a seasonal stop, open from April to October. Initial plans called for a temporary platform to be erected in 2016, with a permanent platform constructed with $300,000 in town money and $800,000 in state money for 2017 or 2018. Part of the former Boston & Maine depot building, used for passenger service from 1873 to 1965, was to be leased for use as a waiting area. On October 9, 2018, the Kennebunk Board of Selectmen cancelled the station project over concerns about the suitability of the site. In November 2021, it was announced a stop in Kennebunk was back on the table, although not likely a priority ahead of other expansions and improvements.

In 2019, NNEPRA officials began looking into moving the Portland station. The Portland Transportation Center is on a branch line, which adds 15 minutes to travel time for trains to or from Brunswick. Other concerns with the current station include limited parking and its location on Thompson's Point. A new location could put the station on the main line, move it closer to downtown, and improve vehicular and pedestrian access. In 2021, a MaineDOT study endorsed moving the station to a location near the original location of Portland's Union Station.

NNERPA plans to extend an existing 2-mile (3.2 km) siding in Wells by 6 miles (9.7 km), which will allow an additional daily Brunswick-Wells round trip. Wells station will get a second platform and a footbridge. In February 2020, NNERPA was awarded a $16.9 million federal grant for the project.

In July 2019, local officials proposed an infill station in West Falmouth next to a Maine Turnpike exit.

==== High-speed rail ====
In October 2000, the Federal Railroad Administration designated a route from Boston to Portland and Auburn as one component of the Northern New England Corridor, a proposed high-speed rail project.

=== Brunswick extension ===
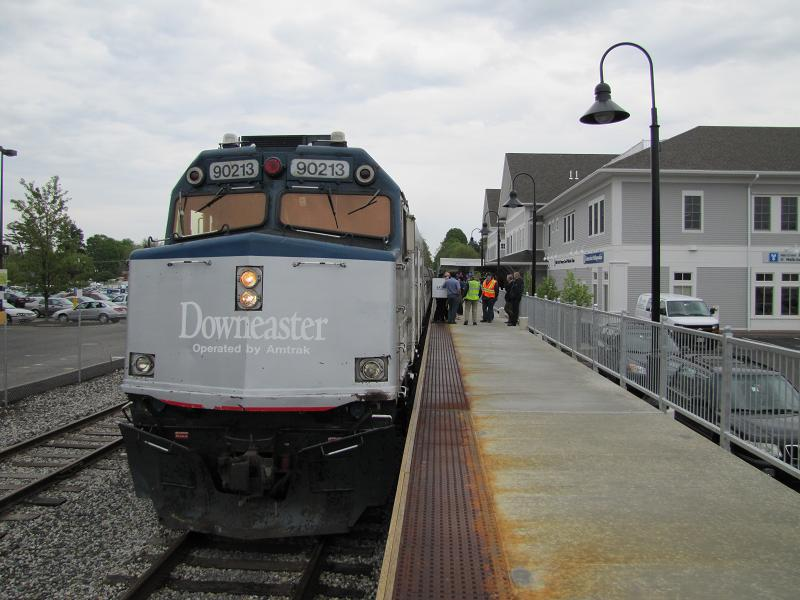
A Downeaster special train at Brunswick in June 2012, five months before the start of service

Service to Brunswick was originally intended to begin within five years of the Downeaster's 2001 launch, but was delayed by lack of funding and other obstacles. Ground was broken in October 2008 for Brunswick station, a retail development that included shops, condominiums, an inn, and office space. In January 2010, NNEPRA received a $35 million grant from the American Recovery and Reinvestment Act of 2009 for track and signal upgrades for the Portland-Brunswick line. Pan Am Railways began work on the line in summer 2010, and on May 14, 2012, the platforms in Brunswick and Freeport were declared complete. Service began on November 1, 2012, with two daily services to and from Boston.

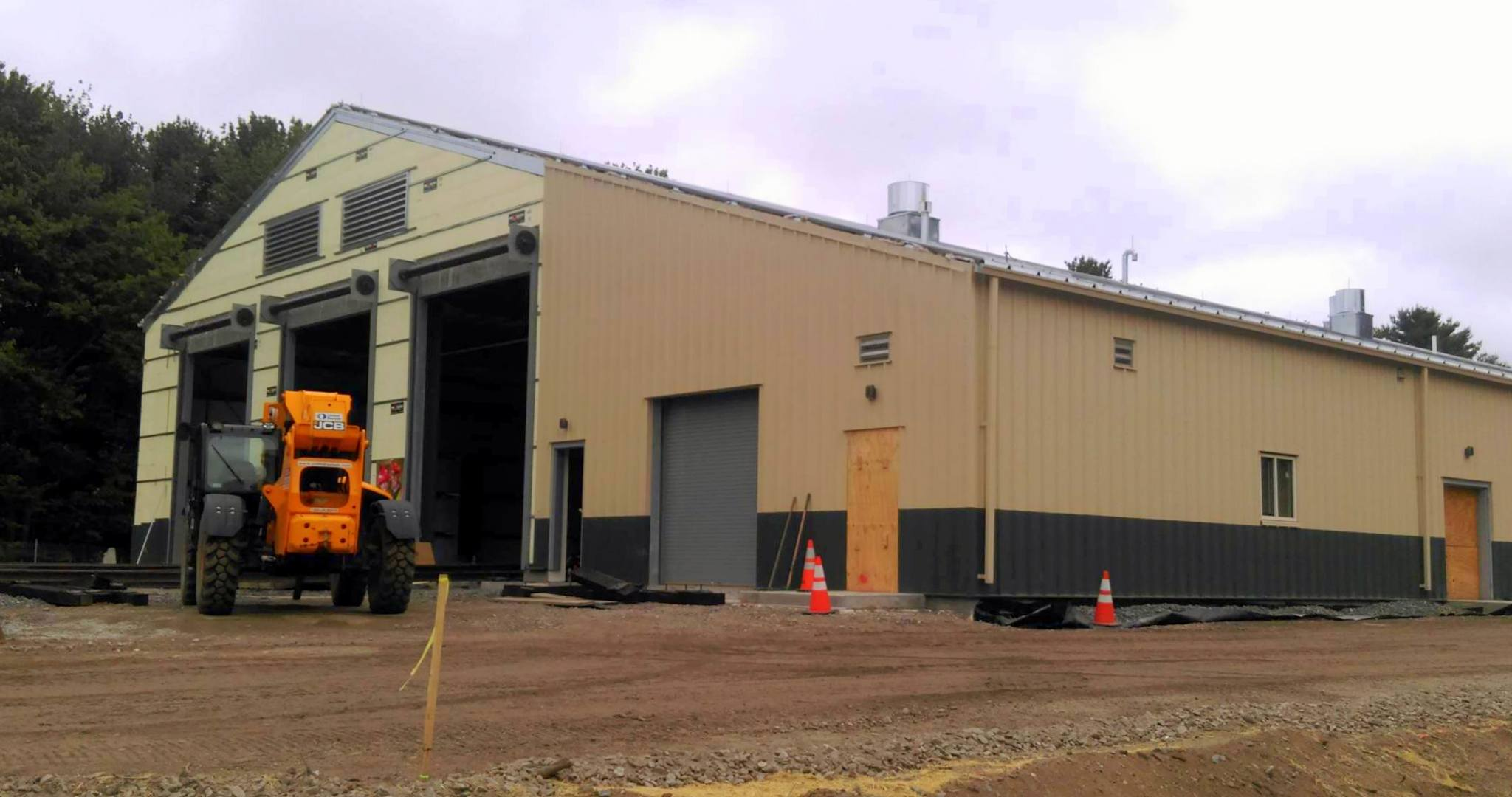
The maintenance facility under construction in July 2016

The extension to Brunswick led to the construction of an enclosed layover facility there, just west of the station; trains had previously been stored outdoors in Portland. The facility opened in November 2016, permitting a third daily Brunswick–Boston trip. NNEPRA announced plans for the facility in 2013, with construction slated to run from summer 2013 until late 2014, but local opposition delayed the project. Neighbors of the planned location demanded further environmental studies, saying they believe the facility would hurt nearby areas. State politicians became involved; Governor Paul LePage, concerned about job creation at Brunswick Landing, suggested alternate locations in eastern Brunswick. Several Democratic state legislators asked NNEPRA to build in an existing rail yard in South Portland, and to focus on the "core product" of Boston–Portland service instead. Legal challenges to the facility ended in January 2016.

In 2017 and 2018, NNEPRA constructed a 4-mile (6 km) passing track, the Royal Junction siding, on the 30-mile (48 km) single-track section of line between Portland and Brunswick to enable an increase from three to five daily round trips to Brunswick. The increase to five weekday round trips between Boston and Brunswick (with four Brunswick round trips and one Portland round trip on weekends) took place on November 12, 2018. All five weekend round trips began running to Brunswick on May 20, 2019.

=== 2015 winter and track work ===
The Downeaster's ridership, finances, and performance suffered in the first half of 2015 because of an exceptionally brutal winter and a subsequent large-scale tie replacement project funded by the NNEPRA. During its fiscal year 2015 (July 2014 to June 2015), Amtrak cancelled 488, or 13 percent, of its scheduled Downeaster trains. The trains that ran saw an on-time percentage of 30%, less than half the national average of 71%; during the tie replacement, none ran on time in May and 8% in June. Ridership dropped 18.2% (nearly 100,000 fewer riders) from the previous fiscal year.

The Downeaster resumed its full schedule on August 1, 2015, following the completion of the track repairs. By December 2015, the Downeaster was up to a monthly on-time percentage of 86%, well above the national average.

=== 2020s ===
In April 2020, the Downeaster was suspended as part of Amtrak service reductions during the COVID-19 pandemic. A single round trip resumed between Boston and Brunswick on June 15, 2020. Service was increased to four daily round trips in July 2020; the full five round trips resumed on May 3, 2021.

On June 24–27, 2021, Downeaster trains stopped at Falmouth Country Club to serve attendees of the Live and Work in Maine Open.

Design work for positive train control (PTC) over the section of the route between Haverhill and Brunswick was completed in March 2023. (The Boston–Haverhill section had PTC installed by the MBTA several years earlier.) In November 2023, Amtrak and CSX reached a construction agreement under which Amtrak will contribute over $50 million and CSX will perform the work. As of June 2024, the PTC installation is expected to be complete in 2026.

A sixth daily trip between Wells and Brunswick, which will operate in the morning and serve commuters in the Greater Portland Region, is planned to start in 2027.

== Operation ==
=== Equipment ===
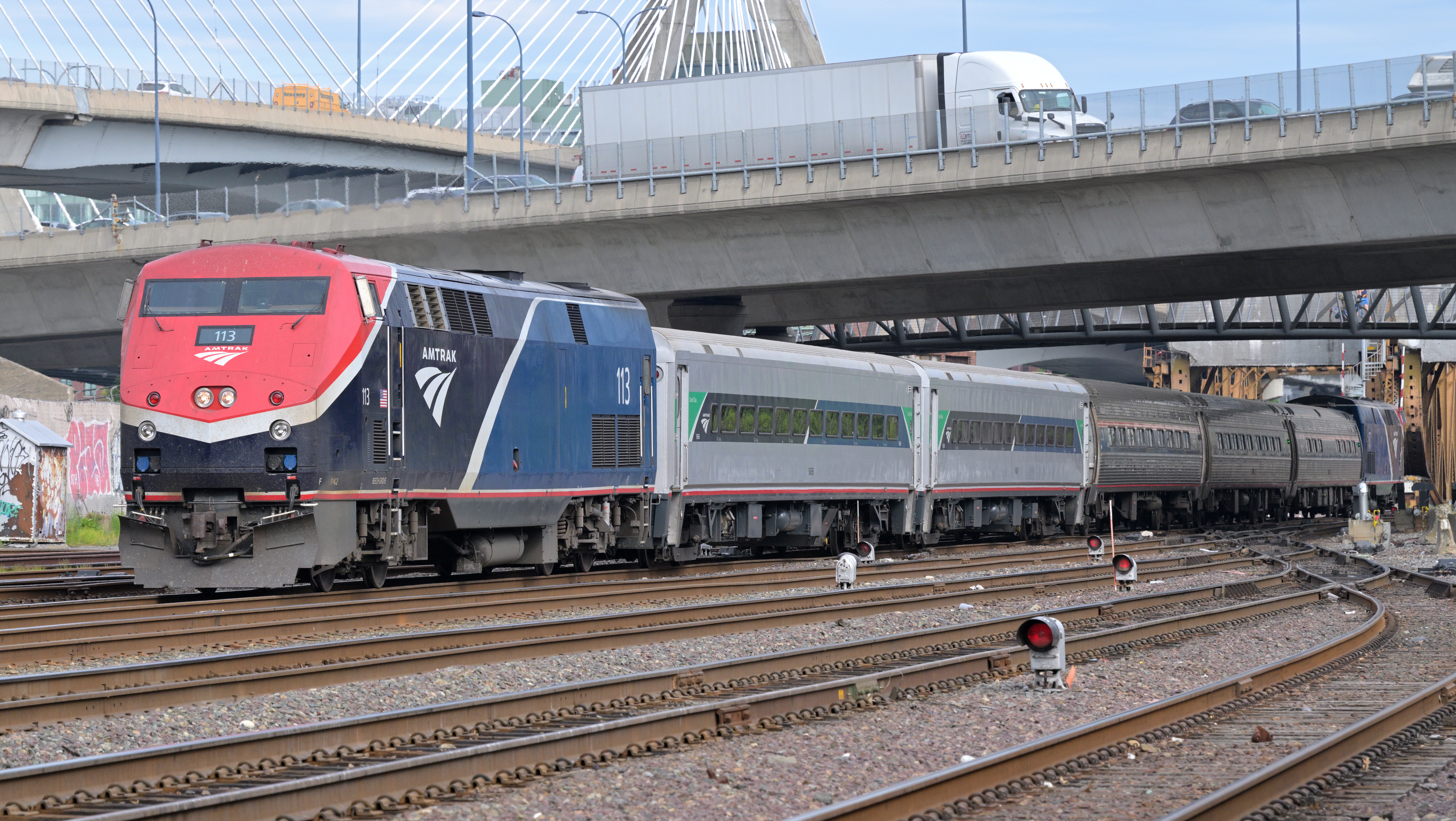
A Downeaster train departing Boston

A typical Downeaster consists of a locomotive, an Amfleet cafe/business car, and three or four Horizon and/or Amfleet coaches. A second locomotive or a Non-Powered Control Unit (a former EMD F40PH locomotive converted into a control car) runs on the southbound end of the train for push-pull operation. As of June 2026 three trainsets are used to provide service. Trains operate at speeds up to 79 miles per hour (127 km/h).

By 2031, the train's existing equipment is expected to be replaced by Amtrak Airo trainsets, Amtrak's branding for trainsets combining Siemens Venture passenger cars with a Siemens Charger diesel-electric locomotive. The trainsets for the Downeaster will include six passenger cars with a food service area and a mix of 2×2 Coach Class and 1×2 Business Class seating.

=== Classes of service ===
All classes of service include complimentary WiFi, an electric outlet (120 V, 60 Hz AC) at each seat, reading lamps, fold-out tray tables. Reservations are required on all trains, tickets may be purchased online, from an agent at some stations, a ticketing machine at most stations, or, at a higher cost, from the conductor on the train.

- Coach Class: 2×2 seating. Passengers self-select seats on a first-come, first-served basis.
- Business Class: 1×2 seating with more legroom than coach. Passengers receive complimentary soft drinks. Passengers self-select seats on a first-come, first-served basis.

Some Downeaster trains carry volunteers, coordinated by Trainriders Northeast, to inform passengers about destinations, attractions, and transfers.

=== Ridership and finances ===
Between December 2001 through 2005, annual ridership ranged from 250,000 to 300,000 passengers. In fiscal year 2011, ridership topped 500,000 for the first time. Ridership dropped sharply due to the COVID-19 pandemic, but was back up to 516,723 in fiscal year 2023. Ridership was 598,426 in fiscal year 2024 – 4% higher than the previous record in 2019.

The line's busiest station is North Station in Boston. Due in part to the route's success, North Station was the 23rd busiest Amtrak station in the country in fiscal year 2018, and the fifth busiest in New England (behind South Station, Providence, New Haven Union and Back Bay). The busiest station in Maine is the Portland Transportation Center, while Exeter is New Hampshire's busiest.

As of 2013, operational costs were around $15 million annually, $5.6 million of which is covered by Congestion Mitigation and Air Quality Improvement Program (CMAQ) funding, $8.1 million in revenues, and $1.8 million in operating subsidy from the State of Maine. 58% of the overall ridership travels to or from the state of Maine.

=== Economic impact ===
A 2008 study by the Chicago-based Center for Neighborhood Technology suggested that the Brunswick extension, combined with commercial developments along the "Downeaster Corridor", could generate several billion dollars in construction investments plus $55 million annually in tax revenue for the state of Maine.

In 2013, the Northern New England Passenger Rail Authority estimated that the Downeaster has an annual economic impact of $12 million from visitors to Maine, and directly or indirectly employs 200 people.

=== Route ===
Amtrak Downeaster

The Downeaster uses the MBTA's Lowell Line from Boston's North Station to Wilmington, the Wildcat Branch to Wilmington Junction, and the Haverhill Line to the Massachusetts–New Hampshire state line. From there to just short of Brunswick, it uses CSX Transportation's former Pan Am Railways Freight Main Line. The last mile of track in Brunswick is owned by MaineDOT. Lines south of Portland were once part of the Boston and Maine Railroad; the part south of Wilmington Junction was once the mainline and a branch of the Boston and Lowell Railroad, and the rest was the mainline of the B&M. The line north of Portland to Brunswick was once part of the Maine Central Railroad.

If the Downeaster were to run solely on the Haverhill Line, it would conflict with the local commuter rail service on a largely single-tracked rail line, since the Amtrak train makes no stops between Woburn and Haverhill. By using the Wildcat Branch to cross between the Lowell and Haverhill lines, the Downeaster can pass a Haverhill train.

Passengers are generally prohibited from purchasing Downeaster tickets to ride between Woburn and Boston, a route served by MBTA commuter trains; this keeps seats free for longer-distance passengers. This restriction is lifted during MBTA service disruptions on the Lowell or Haverhill lines.

The Downeaster is separated from the rest of Amtrak's system because there is no direct link between Boston's train stations. Downeaster passengers continuing from Boston can ride six stops on the MBTA Orange Line to Amtrak's Back Bay station, where they can make connections to Amtrak's Northeast Corridor services to New York and points south, as well as the Lake Shore Limited to Chicago.

A proposed connection is strongly supported by U.S. Senator Ed Markey, former Massachusetts governor Michael Dukakis, and others who are pushing for the connection so the diesel engines that currently haul the Downeaster can be replaced by electrified ones.

=== Station stops ===
State	Location	Station	Connections
ME	Brunswick	Brunswick	Greater Portland Metro Bus; Western Maine Transportation Services
ME	Freeport	Freeport	
ME	Portland	Portland	Concord Coach Lines; Greater Portland Metro Bus
ME	Old Orchard Beach	Old Orchard Beach	BSOOB Transit
ME	Saco	Saco	BSOOB Transit
ME	Wells	Wells	Greyhound Lines
NH	Dover	Dover	COAST
NH	Durham	Durham–UNH	UNH Campus Connector
NH	Exeter	Exeter	
MA	Haverhill	Haverhill	MBTA Commuter Rail: Haverhill Line; MEVA
MA	Woburn	Woburn–Anderson	MBTA Commuter Rail: Lowell Line; Massport: Logan Express
MA	Boston	North Station	MBTA subway: Green Line, Orange Line; MBTA Commuter Rail: Fitchburg Line, Lowell Line, Haverhill Line, Newburyport/Rockport Line; MBTA bus EZRide; MBTA ferry: F10; Seaport Ferry

== Proposed extensions ==
=== Bangor ===
There have been various proposals to extend Downeaster service from Brunswick along the old Maine Central Railroad main line to Augusta, Waterville, and Bangor, which last saw passenger train service in 1961 at Bangor Union Station.

In April 2015, Representative Michelle Dunphy and nine cosponsors introduced a bill in the Maine House that would direct MaineDOT to study the feasibility and cost of extending passenger rail to Bangor. The bill "died between houses" when legislators declined to appropriate the $300,000 cost from the highway fund. Dunphy and eight cosponsors reintroduced the bill in February 2017, but it also died in committee.

In January 2021, Senator Joe Baldacci and seven cosponsors introduced a bill similar to Dunphy's in the Maine Senate. This bill was passed unanimously through committee in May 2021, and in June 2021 was passed by the legislature and signed by Governor Janet Mills. The amended bill directs MaineDOT to study the propensity for new passenger rail or other transit between Portland and Bangor by January 1, 2023, but only if local municipalities provide 25% of the study's cost.

In March 2021, Amtrak did not include the route to Bangor in its "Amtrak Connects Us" 15-year expansion vision. Local stakeholders stated that they had not signed off on the plan, and that the omission does not preclude future service.

In April 2023, the results of the studies ordered in 2021 were published. MaineDOT concluded that a rail extension was not feasible, citing high capital costs and projected operating subsidies and limited projected ridership. Augmenting existing intercity bus service along the proposed extension corridor was recommended instead. Some politicians, including Baldacci and Auburn mayor Jason Levesque, stated that they would continue to pursue a rail extension.

=== Lewiston–Auburn ===
In 1960, the Maine Central Railroad ended passenger train service between Portland and Lewiston–Auburn, Maine's second-largest metropolitan area. Two existing rail lines have been identified as candidates for restored service along the route: the private Pan Am Railways line (expected to merge with CSX) and the state-owned St. Lawrence and Atlantic line.

An August 2011 feasibility study by MaineDOT examined a Portland-to-Auburn service, which would take 40 minutes and consist of eight daily round trips. There would be a bus connection from Auburn to downtown Lewiston. The report estimated 30,000 to 46,000 riders per year, depending on the number of direct rides to Boston versus transfers. The construction costs were placed at $107 million to $234 million, with annual operating costs of $3.5 to $9.4 million and a farebox recovery ratio of 15 to 27%.

In April 2013, NNEPRA announced that a plan for revived Portland-Lewiston–Auburn passenger rail would be released later in the year. New infrastructure needed for the route was said to include a layover facility in Brunswick (built in 2016), 4 miles (6.4 km) of new passing track in Yarmouth (the Royal Junction Siding, built in 2018), a wye in Portland, and an island platform at Portland Transportation Center.

In December 2016, NNEPRA hired VHB and WSP to produce a propensity report for the extension. Released in May 2018, the report forecast daily ridership of 250 to 330 given four round-trip trains per day, and 700 to 1,900 given 12 to 20 round-trip trains. The lower estimate alone was said to position Lewiston–Auburn as the third-busiest station of the Downeaster.

In June 2021, the Maine Legislature passed a bill directing MaineDOT to conduct an "economic evaluation study" building on the 2018 study, positioning the project for new federal funding expected from the Biden agenda. The state required municipalities to fund 10% of the $200,000 cost. Lewiston officials approved $10,000, but Auburn's city council refused, calling the project a "money pit." Portland stepped in to cover the remaining cost.

"Amtrak Connects Us" 15-year expansion vision, released in March 2021, did not include the route to Lewiston–Auburn.

==== Bethel ====
MaineDOT's 2011 study also looked into a longer extension beyond Auburn to Bethel, with intermediate stops in Auburn and South Paris. This option was estimated to draw 66,700 to 71,100 riders per year.

=== Rockland ===
Until April 1959, the Maine Central Railroad provided passenger service from Brunswick east to Rockland, Maine, via the 56-mile Rockland Branch. The State of Maine purchased the line in 1987. From 2003 to 2015, the Maine Eastern Railroad leased operation of the line, offering seasonal excursion service to Rockland. The route was popular with summer vacationers; Rockland station is within walking distance of Rockland Ferry Terminal, which serves Vinalhaven, North Haven, and Matinicus. The Canadian Pacific Railway took over operations in June 2020, but does not run passenger service.

In 2017, NNEPRA announced plans for a 2018 pilot program that would extend one weekend Downeaster round trip to Rockland between Memorial Day and Labor Day. Intermediate stops would be made in Bath, Wiscasset, and Newcastle. The proposed pilot was later pared to three weekends in summer 2018, before ultimately being cancelled when Amtrak failed to conduct a risk assessment in time. Plans for a summer 2019 pilot also fell through when time ran out to reach a contract with the Central Maine and Quebec Railway. In August 2019, local stakeholders inspected the route aboard an Amtrak track geometry car, looking toward a summer 2020 pilot. In August 2021, NNEPRA said that the extension project is on hold, though public support remains for it.

In March 2021, Amtrak included the extension to Rockland in its "Amtrak Connects Us" 15-year expansion vision, coinciding with the Biden administration's push to pass an infrastructure bill. Amtrak's map lists stops in Waldoboro and Thomaston, as well as those previously proposed in Bath, Wiscasset, and Newcastle.

Finger Lakes Railway proposed a private alternative to this extension in January 2022. Under the plan, their subsidiary Midcoast Rail Service would operate a rail shuttle to Rockland that would have timed transfers with the Downeaster in Brunswick. One daily round trip would run year-round, unlike in Amtrak's seasonal proposal. Two daily round trips would run on summer weekends. On June 12, Finger Lakes exited its lease to operate the branch after the loss of its primary freight customer, rendering the line unprofitable to operate and again putting Downeaster expansion plans on hold.

In January 2025, MaineDOT selected Maine Switching Services to operate their branch. The company's proposal included plans for seasonal excursion service but not a Downeaster extension.

=== Westbrook ===
In 2019, developers of the Rock Row development in Westbrook were looking into a rail link to the city. The rail shuttle would connect Commercial Street in Portland with high-density developments at Thompson's Point, Rock Row, and to other transit services, which would support private investments and reduce the growing congestion. A NNEPRA feasibility study estimated that it would cost about $100 million to establishing such a service—mostly infrastructure and rolling stock—and between $7 million and $13 million annually to operate, depending on the service.

== See also ==
- Railroad history of Portland, Maine
- North–South Rail Link, a proposed tunnel in Boston that would link the Downeaster service with the rest of Amtrak's network
- Public transportation in Maine
