= Cumberland and Knox Railroad =

Overview
- Main region: Maine
- Fleet: 2 leased diesel locomotives
- Parent company: Maine Switching Services
- Headquarters: 212 Depot Street; Unity, ME 04988
- Key people: Joe Feero (president)
- Locale: Brunswick to Rockland
- Dates of operation: 2025–present
- Predecessor: Midcoast Railservice (2024, on the Rockland Branch)

Technical
- Track gauge: 1,435 mm (4 ft 8 1/2 in)

Other
- Website: maineswitching.com ckrailroad.com penbayrail.com

The Cumberland and Knox Railroad (reporting mark CKRR) is a shortline railroad in the United States. It operates freight services over the Rockland Branch between Brunswick, Maine, and Rockland, Maine.

== History ==
The previous operator of the Rockland Branch, Midcoast Railservice, ceased operations in 2024 after the closure of the line's primary customer, Dragon Cement. The Maine Department of Transportation selected Maine Switching Services as the new operator in January 2025.

Maine Switching Service announced the "Cumberland and Knox Railroad" name in April 2025, and service began on May 31, 2025. In October 2025, the CKRR purchased two passenger cars from the Adirondack Railroad, and bought a 3rd coach in the winter of 2025. The Midcoast Rail Heritage Trust, the operator of the Belfast & Moosehead Lake Railroad passenger services, plans to use these passenger cars alongside CKRR locomotives as a tourist train called the Pen Bay Scenic Railroad. This service is scheduled to open in 2026.

== Roster ==
Locomotive details
Reporting mark	Number	Builder	Type	Build date	History	Status	Assigned to	Notes
LTEX	1555	EMD	GP9u	1956	Ex-DSSR 1555, nee-CP GP9 8618	Operational	Cumberland & Knox Railroad, Rockland, Maine.	Owned by Larry's Truck and Electric (LTEX)
LTEX	1585	EMD	GP9u	05/1955	Ex-DSSR 1585, nee-CP GP9u 1585, nee-CP GP9 8533	Operational	Cumberland & Knox Railroad, Rockland, Maine.	Owned by Larry's Truck and Electric (LTEX)
LTEX	1802	EMD	GP28M	1956	Ex-BNSF 1504, nee-BN 1504, nee-BN GP9 1889, nee-NP 266	Operational	Sappi Paper, Skowhegan, ME.	Owned by Larry's Truck and Electric (LTEX)
