= Rockland station =

Railway station in Rockland, Maine

Rockland
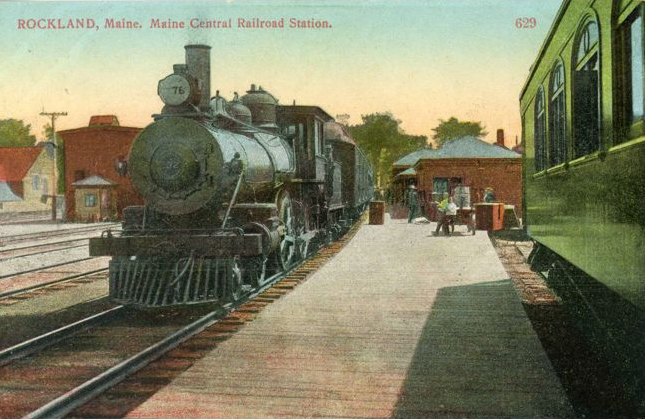
- Rockland Station, ca. 1910

General information
- Location: Union Street and Pleasant Street, Rockland, Maine
- Line: Rockland Branch
- Platforms: 1 Side platform
- Tracks: 1

Construction
- Parking: Yes

History
- Opened: 1917

Former services
Preceding station	Maine Central Railroad	Following station
Thomaston toward Brunswick	Rockland Branch	Terminus
Preceding station	Maine Eastern Railroad	Following station
Newcastle toward Brunswick	Rockland Branch	Terminus
- Rockland Railroad Station
- U.S. National Register of Historic Places
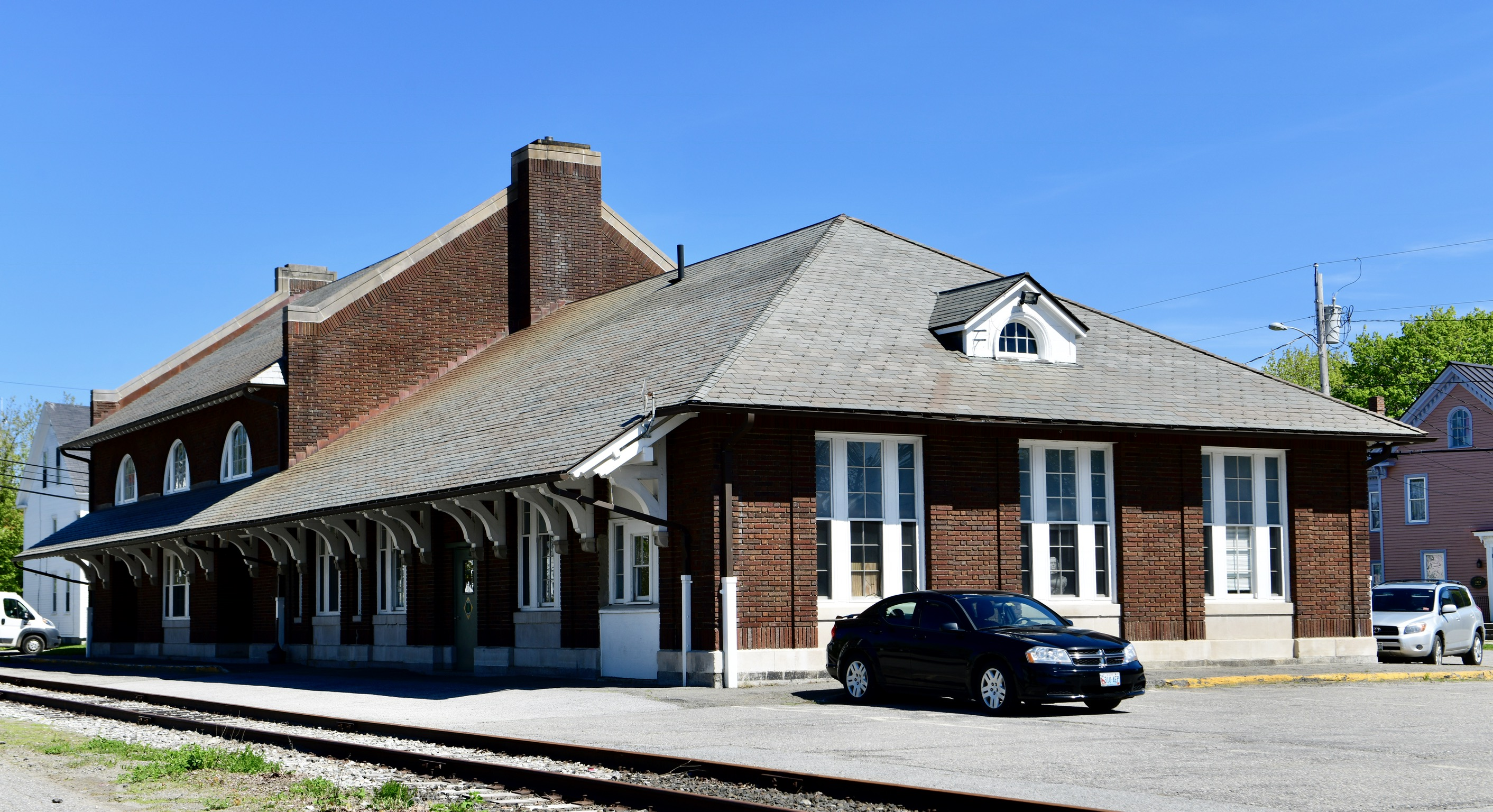
- The station in 2018

- Location within Maine Location within the United States
- Location: Rockland, Maine, USA
- Coordinates: 44°6′3″N 69°6′41″W
- Area: 1 acre (0.4 ha)
- Built: 1917
- Architect: Coolidge and Shattuck for Maine Central Railroad
- NRHP reference No.: 78000327
- Added to NRHP: February 7, 1978
Location

Rockland station is a railway station located at Union and Pleasant Streets in Rockland, Maine. It is the eastern terminus of the Rockland Branch, a state-owned track connecting Rockland and Brunswick. The historic station building was built in 1917 by the Maine Central Railroad, and was listed on the National Register of Historic Places in 1978 as Rockland Railroad Station. It presently houses a restaurant, and served for a time as Rockland's city hall. The line is presently inactive, having most recently had seasonal passenger service from 2004 to 2015 operated by the now-defunct Maine Eastern Railroad. The line would then be leased to the Central Maine and Quebec Railway (CMQ) from 2015 to 2020, then to Canadian Pacific Railway following its purchase of CMQ in 2020. CMQ originally planned to reintroduce service on the line, but not with excursions.

== Description and history ==
The Rockland Branch line was completed in 1871, and was first operated by the Knox and Lincoln Railroad. The line was leased to the Maine Central Railroad in 1891, which took over ownership in 1901 and operated passenger service until 1959. The abandoned line was purchased by the state in 1987, and has been leased over the years to several operators. The line reaches its terminus at the southern end of Rockland's downtown area, with Pleasant Street to the south and Union Street to the east.

On the south side of the track stands the 1917 station building. It is a 1 1/2 story masonry structure, built of brick and concrete. The eastern half of the building has a gabled roof with stepped ends, while the western half is only a single story in height, and is hipped at the far end. The short facade facing Union Street has no windows, but has a ceremonial entrance set in a tall round-arch opening with flanking Doric columns and pilasters. On the south side, the eastern half has three large round-arch openings, the outer two filled with multi-pane windows, and what is now the main entrance in the center one.

=== Passenger service ===
The station was the terminus for Maine Central Railroad passenger trains from Portland, along the Rockland Branch from Brunswick. Until 1958 the Maine Central Railroad ran three trains a day on the days besides Sunday and fewer trains on Sunday. In Portland's Union Station, these trains made connections to trains to Boston, New York City, Bangor and the Canadian Maritimes. In the final months, service diminished to one daily except Sunday trip in each direction, until finally discontinuing on April 4, 1959.

From 2003 to 2015, the Maine Eastern Railroad offered seasonal excursion service to the town, which connected to Amtrak's Downeaster at Brunswick. In October 2017, the Northern New England Passenger Rail Authority announced plans to extend one weekend Downeaster round trip to Rockland between Memorial Day and Labor Day beginning in 2018. Intermediate stops would be made at Bath, Wiscasset, and Newcastle. As part of preparation, Amtrak, along with the Northern New England Passenger Rail Authority, Maine Department of Transportation and the Central Maine and & Quebec Railroad, made a test run of a train on August 14.

Finger Lakes Railway proposed a private alternative to this extension in January 2022. Under the plan, their subsidiary Midcoast Rail Service would operate a rail shuttle to Rockland that would have timed transfers with the Downeaster in Brunswick. One daily round trip would run year-round, unlike in Amtrak's seasonal proposal. Two daily round trips would run on summer weekends.

=== Disposition today ===
After service ended on the line, the station was adapted for use by the city as its city hall, occupying the building until 1996. It was listed on the National Register of Historic Places in 1978 for its architectural significance, and now houses a restaurant, Trackside Station.

== See also ==
- National Register of Historic Places listings in Knox County, Maine
