= Trainriders Northeast =

- Formation: 1989; 37 years ago
- Purpose: rail passenger transportation advocacy
- Headquarters: Portland, Maine
- Region served: New England, United States
- Website: trainridersne.org

Trainriders Northeast is a non-profit citizens' organization group based out of Portland, Maine, in the United States. It was established in 1989 to advocate for the extension of passenger rail service from Boston to Portland and points north. Today Trainriders Northeast may be most well known for their role in bringing passenger service back to Portland, with the Amtrak Downeaster.

The organization was established not only to promote the extension of rail service, but to educate the public on the pros of rail. They also support comprehensive transportation planning, or creating long-term regional transportation plans.

== History ==
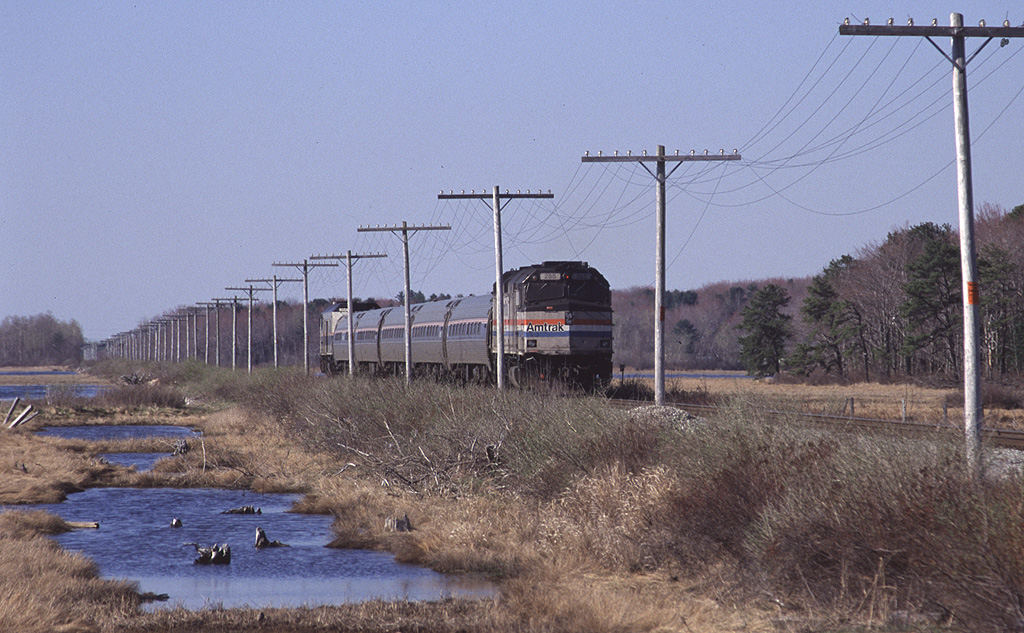
The Downeaster

Trainriders Northeast adopted five goals when they were organized in 1989, the first being the return of passenger rail service to Maine from Boston on the former Pine Tree route of the Boston & Maine and the Maine Central.

One of the original goals was to return passenger rail service from Portland to Brunswick, where Amtrak service could connect with the Maine Eastern Railroad. This was accomplished with a $35 million federal grant. The Maine Eastern Railroad operates a scenic train with service from Brunswick to Rockland, via Bath and Wiscasset. Pan Am Railways completed the work on time and on budget. The Northern New England Passenger Rail Authority initiated passenger rail service to Freeport and Brunswick in December 2012.

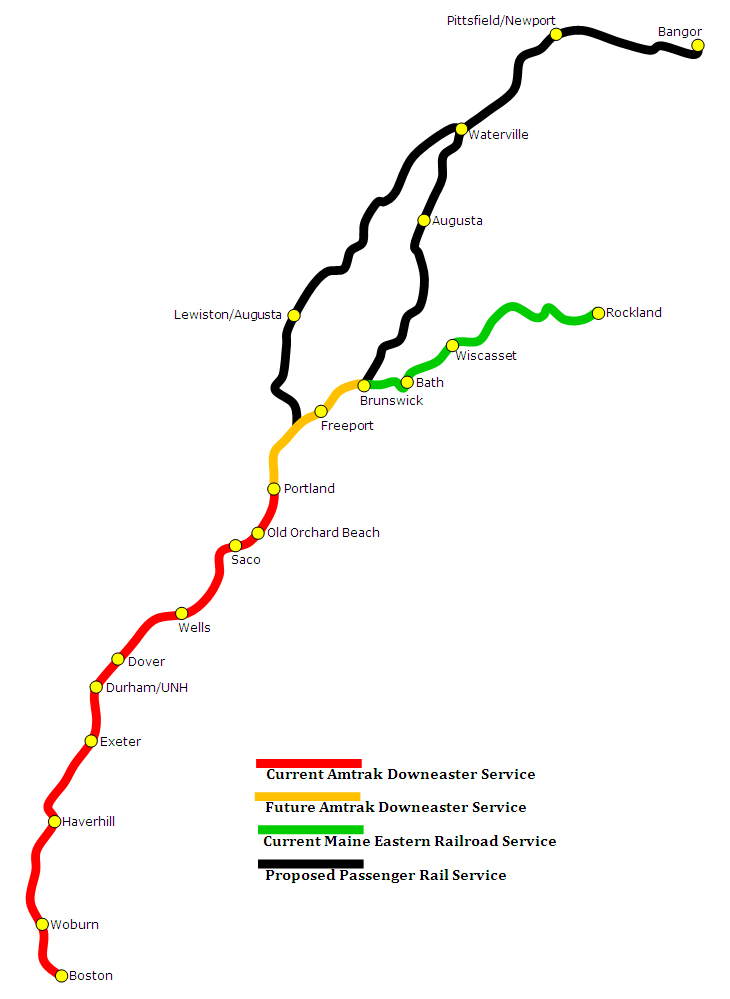
Map of routes proposed by Trainriders Northeast in 2009; service to Brunswick began in 2012

== Goals and objectives ==
Trainriders Northeast also hope to return passenger rail service to Bangor, via Lewiston – Waterville, and via Brunswick – Augusta, along with returning passenger rail service to other areas of Maine, New Hampshire, and Vermont.

The organization also states that it is in their goals to improve and upgrade the current rail system through northern New England.

== Host program ==
Trainriders Northeast sponsors a "Host" program on certain trains. Hosts are volunteers that provide passengers with information on destinations, attractions, and transfers.

== See also ==
- Railroad history of Portland, Maine
