= Maine Coast Railroad =

Overview
- Headquarters: Wiscasset, ME
- Reporting mark: MC
- Locale: Maine
- Dates of operation: 1990–2000
- Predecessor: Maine Central Railroad
- Successor: Safe Handling

Technical
- Track gauge: 4 ft 8 1/2 in (1,435 mm) standard gauge

The Maine Coast Railroad was a railroad company that operated on tracks owned by the Maine Department of Transportation between 1990 and 2000.

== History ==
The company started operations in 1990 after a contract was awarded to the Massachusetts Central Railroad (MCER) to operate the Rockland Branch between Brunswick and Rockland, Maine. The MCER chose to create a new railroad to operate the line, named the Maine Coast. During its first year, the railroad handled little traffic, but in 1991 a large cement producer on the line began shipping its product via rail. As a result of this increase in traffic, the Maine Coast acquired additional locomotives. In 1994, using funding from the Maine Department of Transportation, trackage in Rockland was rebuilt to allow freight to be transferred from the railroad to barges. The railroad closed on December 4, 2000, after losing their lease to the tracks. The lines formerly operated by Maine Coast Railroad was later operated by Maine Eastern Railroad between 2004 & 2015.

== Traffic ==
It offered both freight service and passenger service. The passenger trains operated between Wiscasset and Warren, Maine.

Freight traffic largely consisted of cement products outbound from and coal inbound to Dragon Cement and Concrete in Thomaston. There was also limited perlite and plastic products that moved along the line.

== Motive Power ==
The Maine Coast operated with a small roster of Alco and Montreal Locomotive Works locomotives, including a former Maine Central S-1 (No. 958); a former Norfolk & Western and Central Vermont RS-11 (No. 367); and two Providence and Worcester M420s (Nos. 2002 and 2004).
