= Eastern Maine Railway =

Eastern Maine Railway may refer to:

- Eastern Maine Railway (1882), a U.S. railway merged into the Maine Central Railroad in 1936
- Eastern Maine Railway (1995), a U.S. subsidiary of the New Brunswick Railway Co.

== See also ==
- Maine Eastern Railroad, a U.S. subsidiary of the Morristown and Erie Railway
