= Brunswick station (Maine) =

Train station in Brunswick, Maine

Brunswick, ME
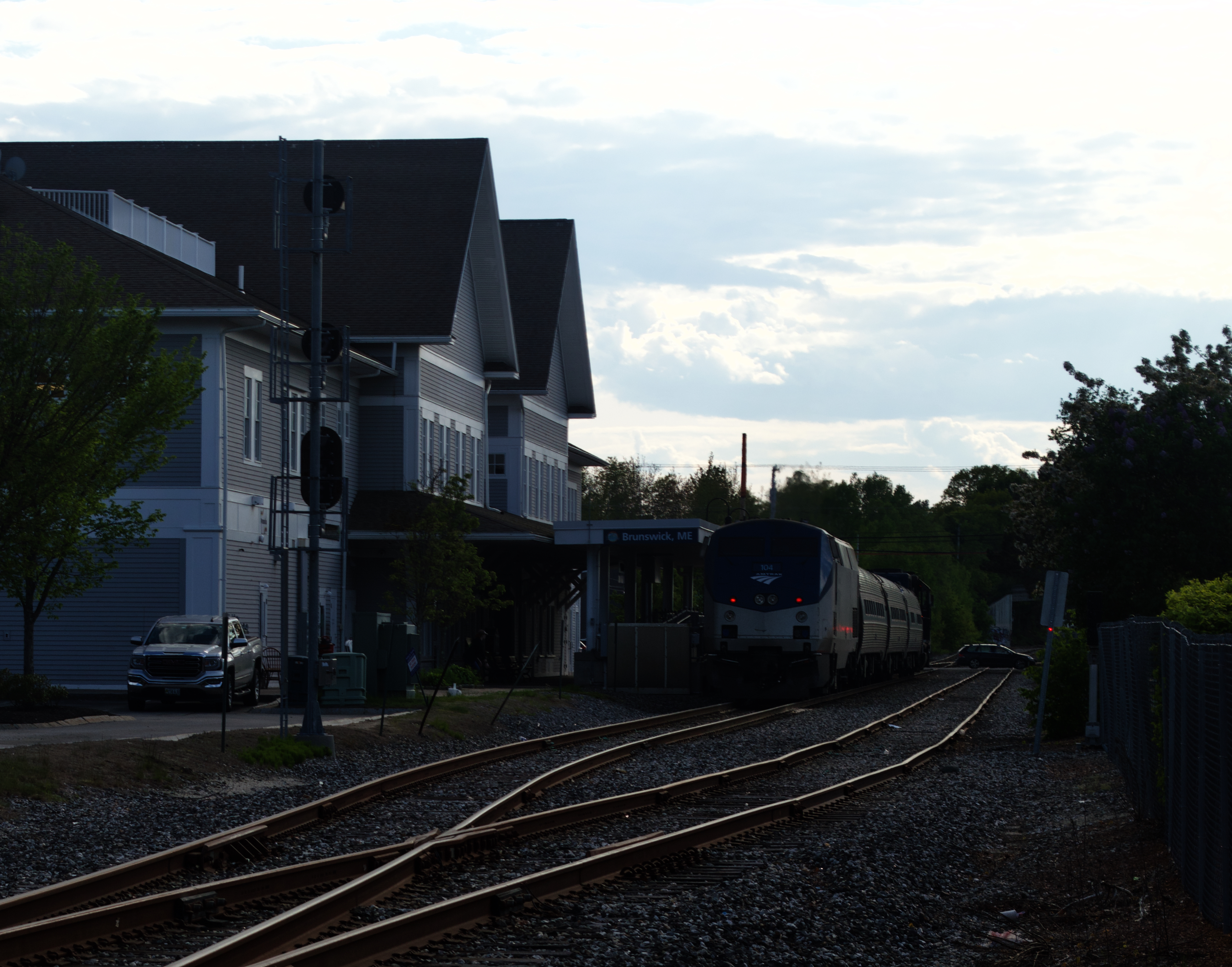
- The Downeaster at Brunswick station in 2025

General information
- Location: 16 Station Avenue; Brunswick, Maine; United States
- Coordinates: 43°54′41″N 69°57′57″W
- Line: CSX Brunswick Branch
- Platforms: 1 side platform
- Tracks: 2
- Connections: Greater Portland Metro Bus: BREEZ; Western Maine Transportation Services, Brunswick Link Bus, BlueLine Commuter Bus

Construction
- Parking: Yes
- Accessible: Yes

Other information
- Station code: Amtrak: BRK

History
- Opened: November 1, 2012

Passengers
- FY 2025: 82,813 (Amtrak)

Services
Preceding station	Amtrak	Following station
Freeport toward Boston North	Downeaster	Terminus
Former services
Preceding station	Maine Eastern Railroad	Following station
Terminus	Rockland Branch	Bath toward Rockland
Location

Brunswick station is a transportation hub and real estate development in Brunswick, Maine. The development was built on the vacant lots surrounding the railroad junction between Portland, Lewiston, Augusta, and Rockland. The station is served by the Amtrak Downeaster.

== History ==
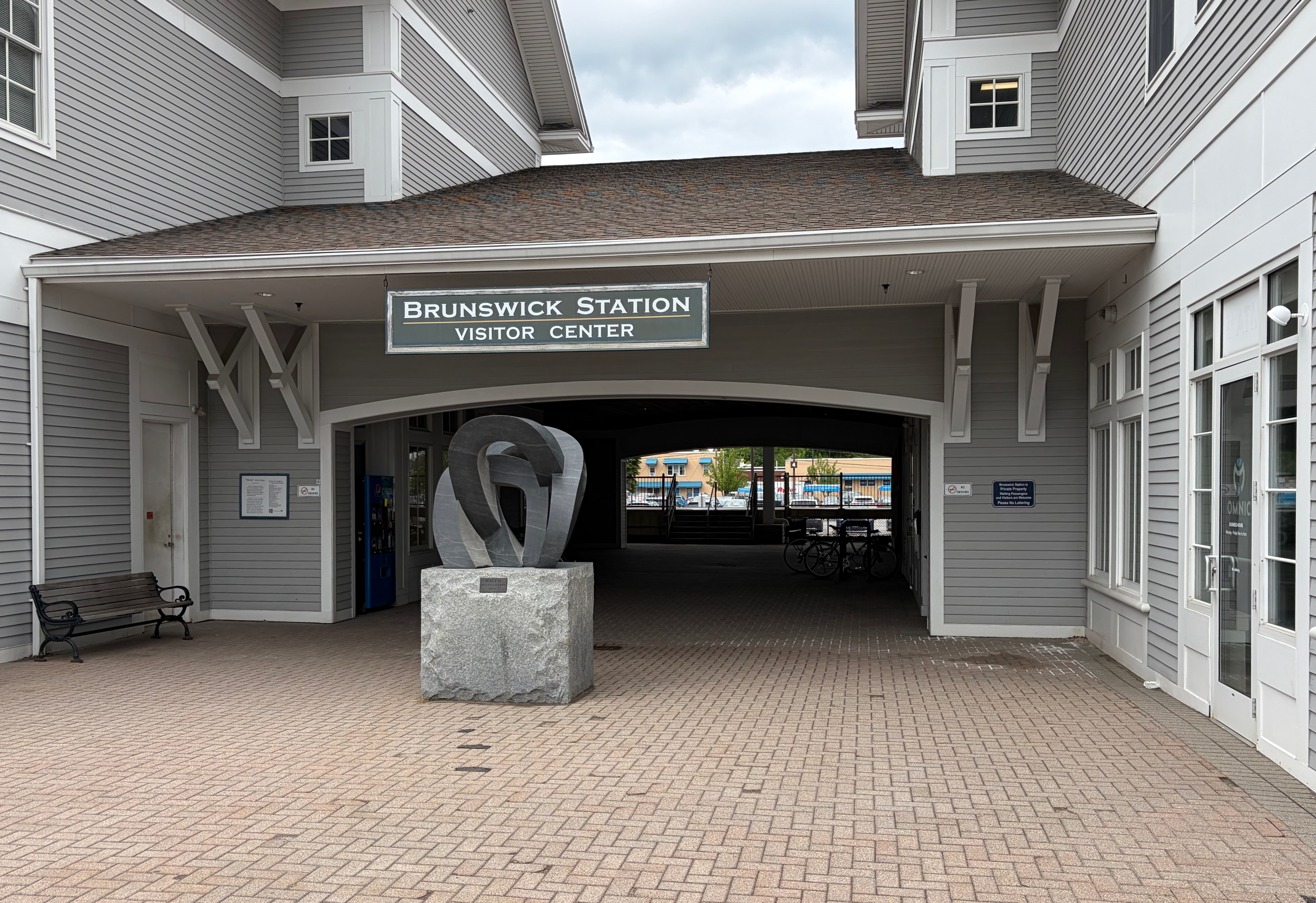
The platform is accessed by an entrance to Brunswick Visitor Center

The first steps of the project began on August 20, 1998, when the Town of Brunswick purchased the land that the development is on for $655,000. Not until 2004 (four years after Amtrak began the Downeaster's Boston-Portland service) did the town begin to consider creating a commercial development around a train station.

On May 28, 2008, the planning board approved the final plan for the station. The plan, developed by JHR Development of Maine, was submitted on January 15, 2008. The current plan was scaled down from the original proposal. Ground was broken for the station on October 18, 2008. A branch of the Bowdoin College bookstore opened in one of the buildings constructed as part of phase I of the development on October 30, 2009.

Construction of Building Three (connected to the platform) was completed in 2009, along with site work and preparation for the other buildings, including Building Four, which hosts the train station. In December 2010, construction began on Building Four (designed by Gawron Turgeon Architects, and built by Wright Ryan Construction). Mid Coast Hospital's Primary Care & Walk-In Clinic is the anchor tenant in this 20,000 square feet (1,900 m^{2}) development.

On January 28, 2010, the Northern New England Passenger Rail Authority received approval for a $35 million grant from the federal government to fund track and signal upgrades for the Portland-Brunswick line. Pan Am Railways began work on the line in spring 2010.

== Passenger train station ==
The station serves as a terminus for Amtrak's Downeaster service. The station is staffed by volunteers. In 2012, Amtrak built a longer high-level platform in preparation for the extension of Downeaster service. Service to Freeport and Brunswick began on November 1, 2012.

Maine Eastern Railroad operated passenger service between Brunswick and Rockland from 2004 to 2015. Maine Eastern used the open lot on Cedar Street prior to the construction of the first phase of Brunswick station when it began boarding passengers from a portable platform at the beginning of the 2010 season.

Limited Brunswick–Rockland excursion service was operated in 2023, but plans for a trial of regular weekend service did not come to fruition.
