= Kennebunk station =

Former train station in Kennebunk, Maine, United States

Kennebunk
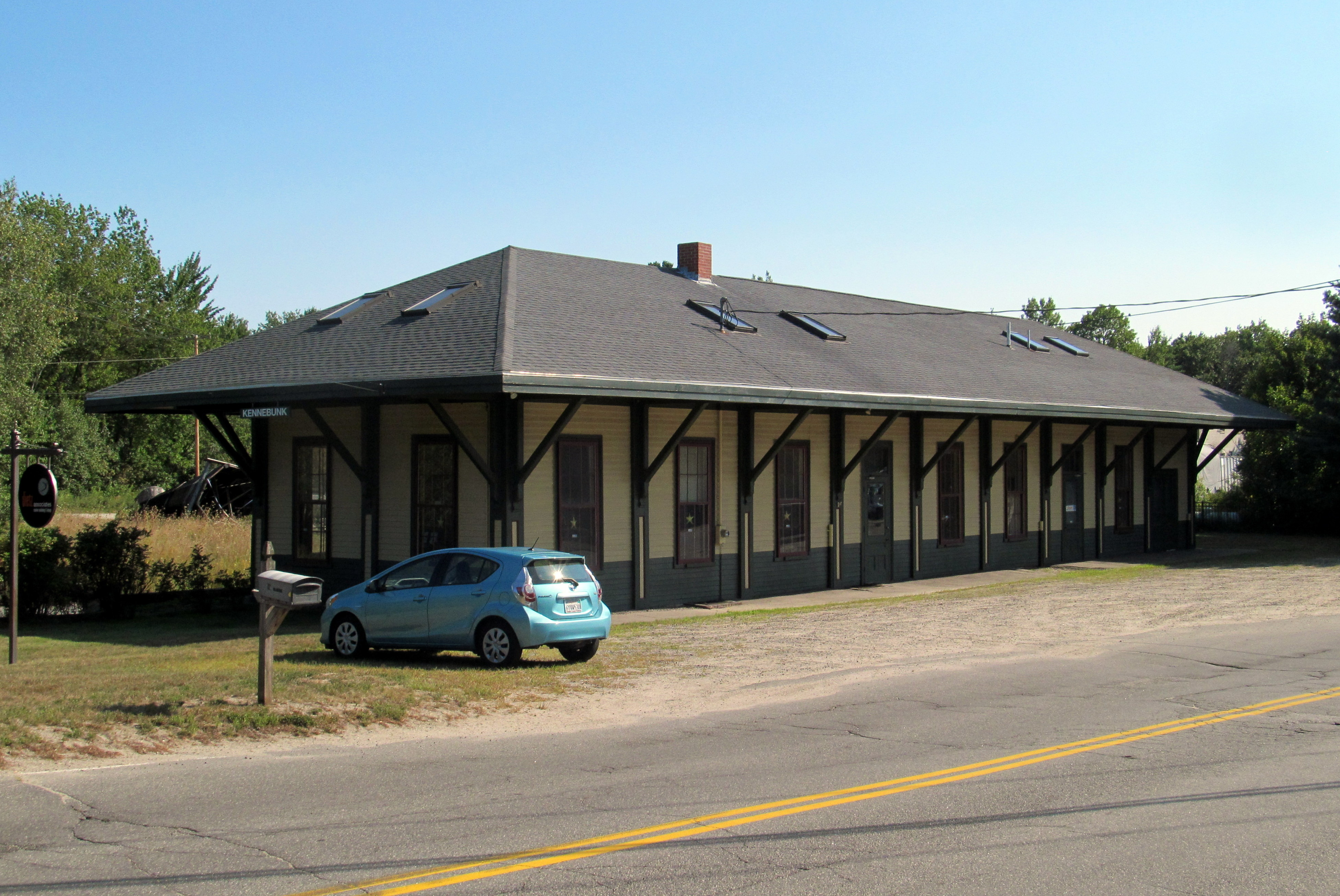
- 1873-built Kennebunk station building in September 2016

General information
- Location: Depot Street; Kennebunk, Maine
- Coordinates: 43°22′57.2″N 70°31′45.7″W
- Owner: Dietz Associates (station building)
- Line: Pan Am Railways Freight Main Line
- Tracks: 1

History
- Opened: 1873
- Closed: January 3, 1965

Former services
Preceding station	Boston and Maine Railroad	Following station
Wells Beach toward Boston	Western Route	Biddeford toward Portland
Location

Kennebunk station is a former train station located off Depot Street in Kennebunk, Maine. The station opened in 1873 and closed in 1965; it is now occupied by a private business. Planning began in 2014 to add Kennebunk as a stop on the Amtrak Downeaster route, but the town cancelled the project in 2018.

== History ==
=== Boston & Maine Railroad ===
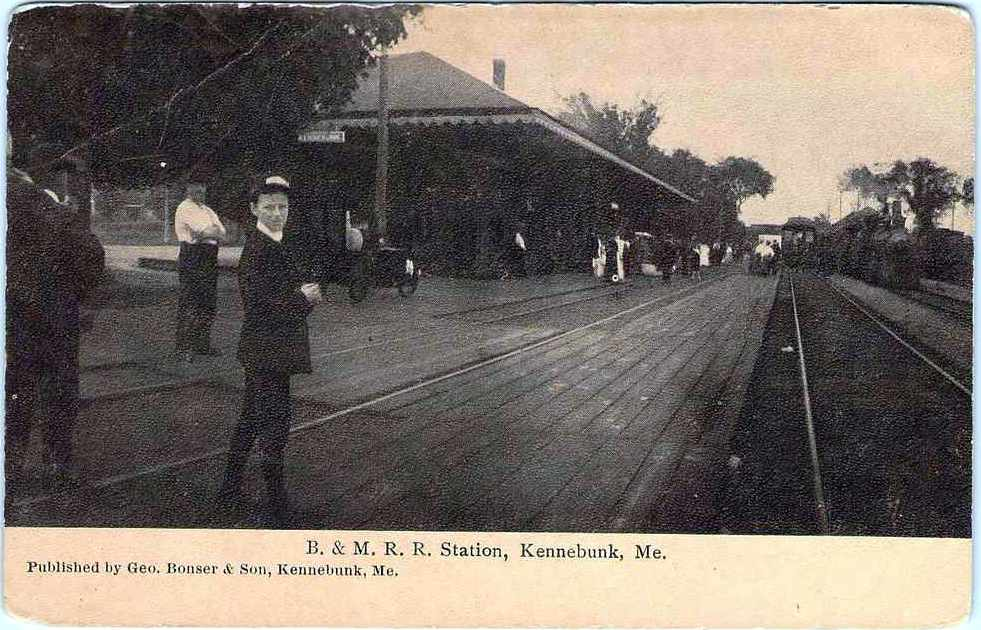
Kennebunk station around 1910, at which time it was the junction for the branch line to Kennebunkport

From the 1840s until 1873, the Boston and Maine Railroad (B&M) used the Portsmouth, Saco and Portland Railroad to reach Portland, Maine. That year, after the joint lease of the PS&P by the B&M and the Eastern Railroad ended, the B&M built an extension of its mainline from South Berwick, Maine to Portland. The foundation for a station at Kennebunk on the new line was begun in 1872 and the station opened the next year. The station was built as a single-story clapboard structure, typical of B&M stations on the line.

The Kennebunk and Kennebunkport Railroad opened in 1883 from Kennebunk to Kennebunkport, Maine. The B&M operated service on the branch until 1926. Mainline service to Kennebunk continued until the final day of service on January 3, 1965. The station building remains, largely unchanged over the past 130 years. After rail service ended, it was used by several businesses, including as the headquarters of Tom's of Maine.

=== Downeaster ===
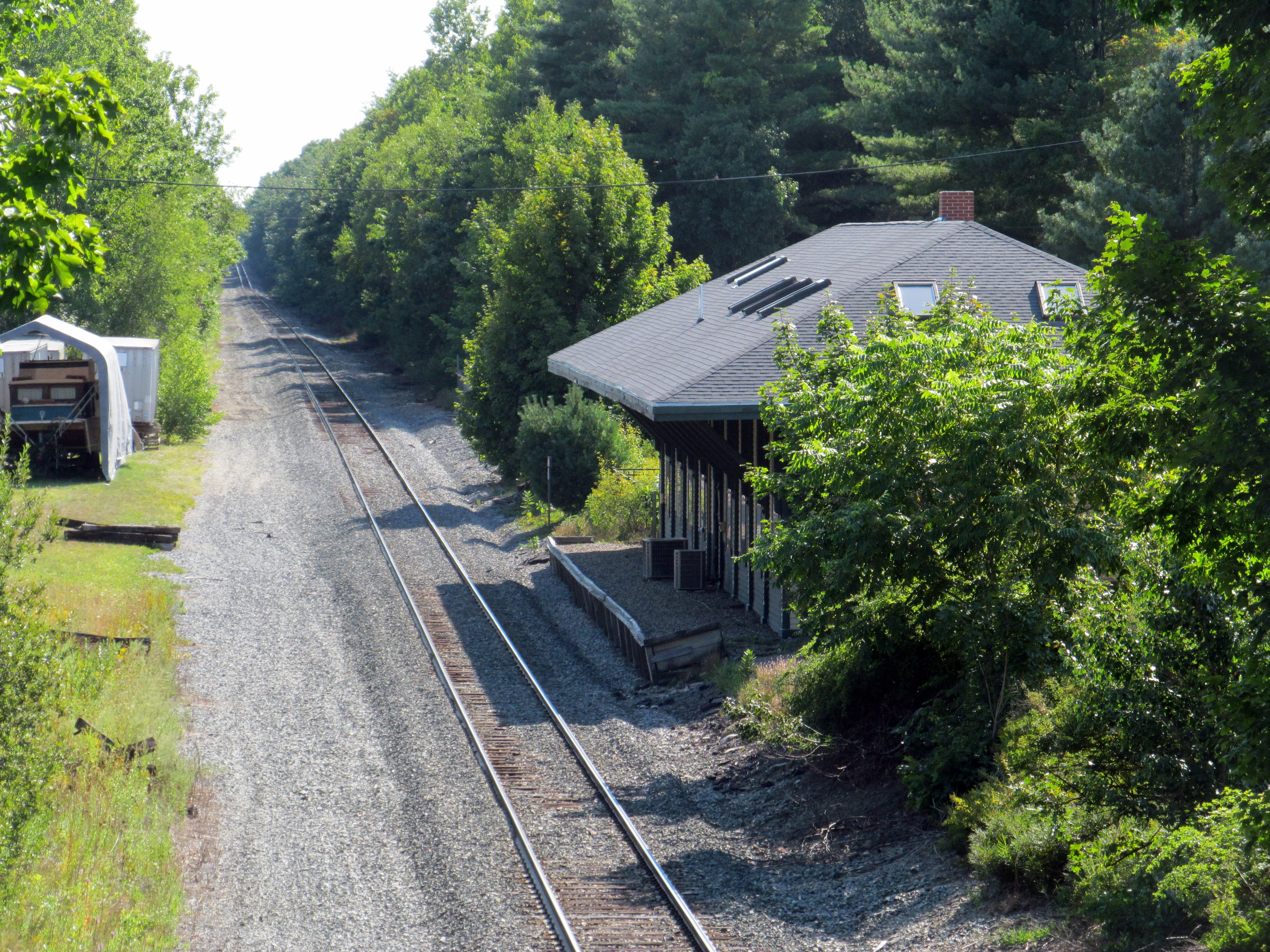
Track side of the station, where the platform would have been located

In 2001, Amtrak begun Downeaster service between Boston and Portland, which ran past but did not stop at Kennebunk. Some residents started to call for a stop at Kennebunk to attract tourists to the town, with serious discussions beginning in 2010. In May 2014, the Northern New England Passenger Rail Authority (which governs Downeaster operations) agreed to add a station stop at Kennebunk. Service as soon as 2015 was considered, but will be delayed until at least 2016 due to the timing of state funding.

In June 2014, Kennebunk voters approved a $300,000 tax increment financing (TIF) plan, which along with $60,000 from Maine Department of Transportation Congestion Mitigation and Air Quality (CMAQ) funds and another $800,000 in CMAQ funds in 2016 would supply the $1.16 million needed to build the station. In October 2014, $183,000 of the TIF money was dedicated to build a 55-space parking lot near the station. In October 2015, the town signed a grant agreement for the station, though the remaining state funds were not yet guaranteed. The town would also pay the $45,000 in annual maintenance costs from the TIF funds.

A small section of the former Boston & Maine depot building was to be leased for use as a waiting area, as required by a deed restriction placed when the property was purchased from the B&M in the 1960s. A 300-foot platform with a high-level section for accessibility was to be built behind the station building. Like Old Orchard Beach, it would have been a seasonal stop only open from April to October, though town officials hoped it might eventually be a year-round stop. By October 2015, the station was expected to be completed by 2017 or 2018. On October 9, 2018, the Kennebunk Board of Selectmen cancelled the station project over concerns about the suitability of the site.

In July 2019, the owners listed the building for sale for $939,000.
