= Freeport station (Maine) =

Train station in Freeport, Maine

Freeport, ME
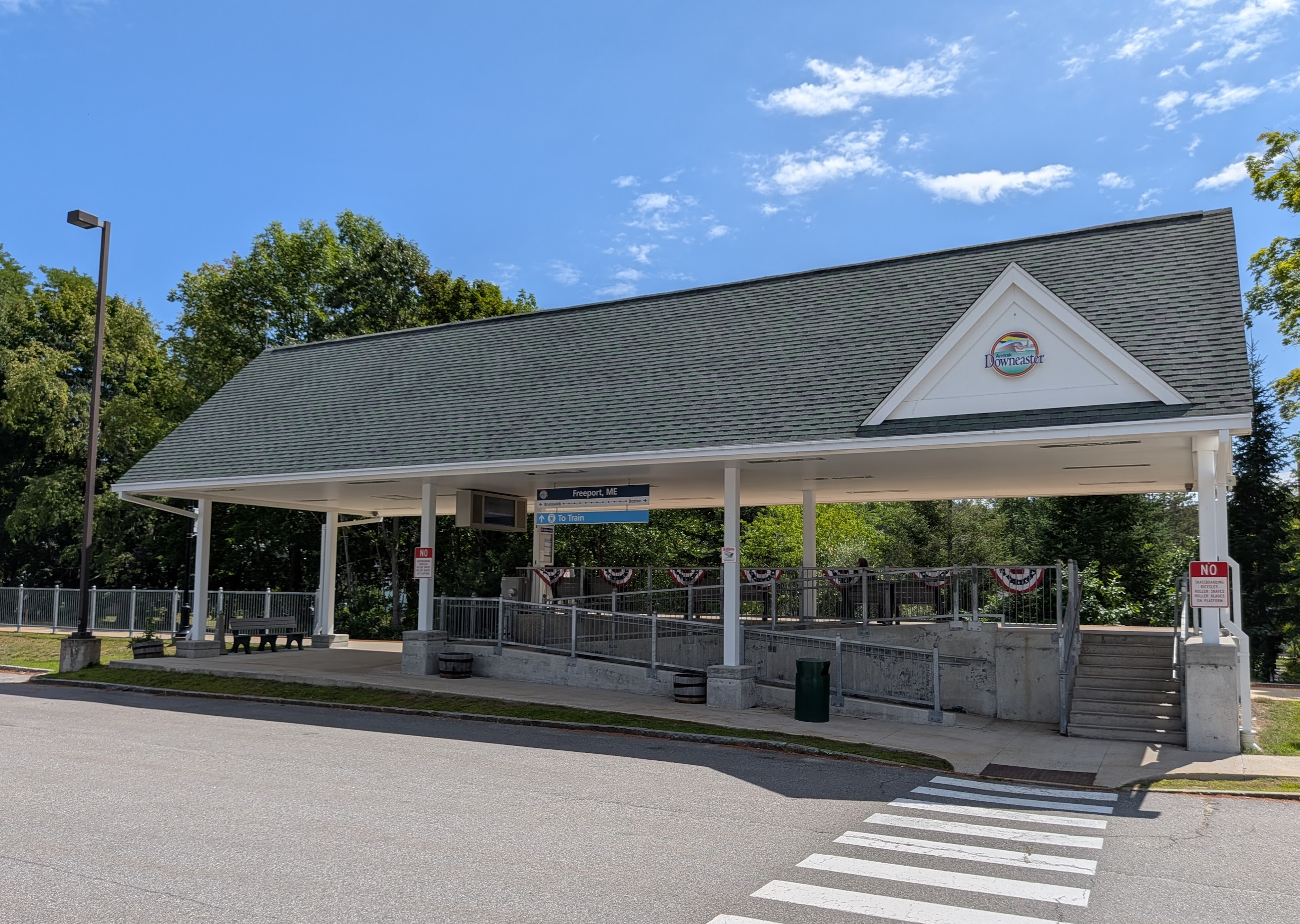
- Freeport station in 2026

General information
- Location: 23 Depot Road; Freeport, Maine; United States
- Coordinates: 43.855°N 70.103°W
- Owner: L.L.Bean, Northern New England Passenger Rail Authority, Town of Freeport
- Line: CSX Brunswick Branch
- Platforms: 1 side platform
- Tracks: 1

Construction
- Parking: Yes
- Accessible: Yes

Other information
- Station code: Amtrak: FRE

History
- Opened: November 1, 2012

Passengers
- FY 2025: 32,176 (Amtrak)

Services
Preceding station	Amtrak	Following station
Portland toward Boston North	Downeaster	Brunswick Terminus
Location

Freeport station is an Amtrak station in Freeport, Maine, served by the Downeaster. The station opened on November 1, 2012, as part of an extension of Downeaster service to Brunswick. That $38.3 million project rehabilitated 30 miles (48 km) of track between Portland and Brunswick and constructed two stations.

An earlier Freeport railway station, serving the Maine Central Railroad, stood a few yards to the northeast, at the intersection of Depot Street and Bow Street, between 1912 and 1964. It replaced the original structure, which burned in 1911. The 1912 replacement was transported 50 miles (80 km) up the coast of Maine to Boothbay, where it is now on show at Boothbay Railway Village.
