= Rockland Ferry Terminal =

State ferry terminal in Rockland, Maine

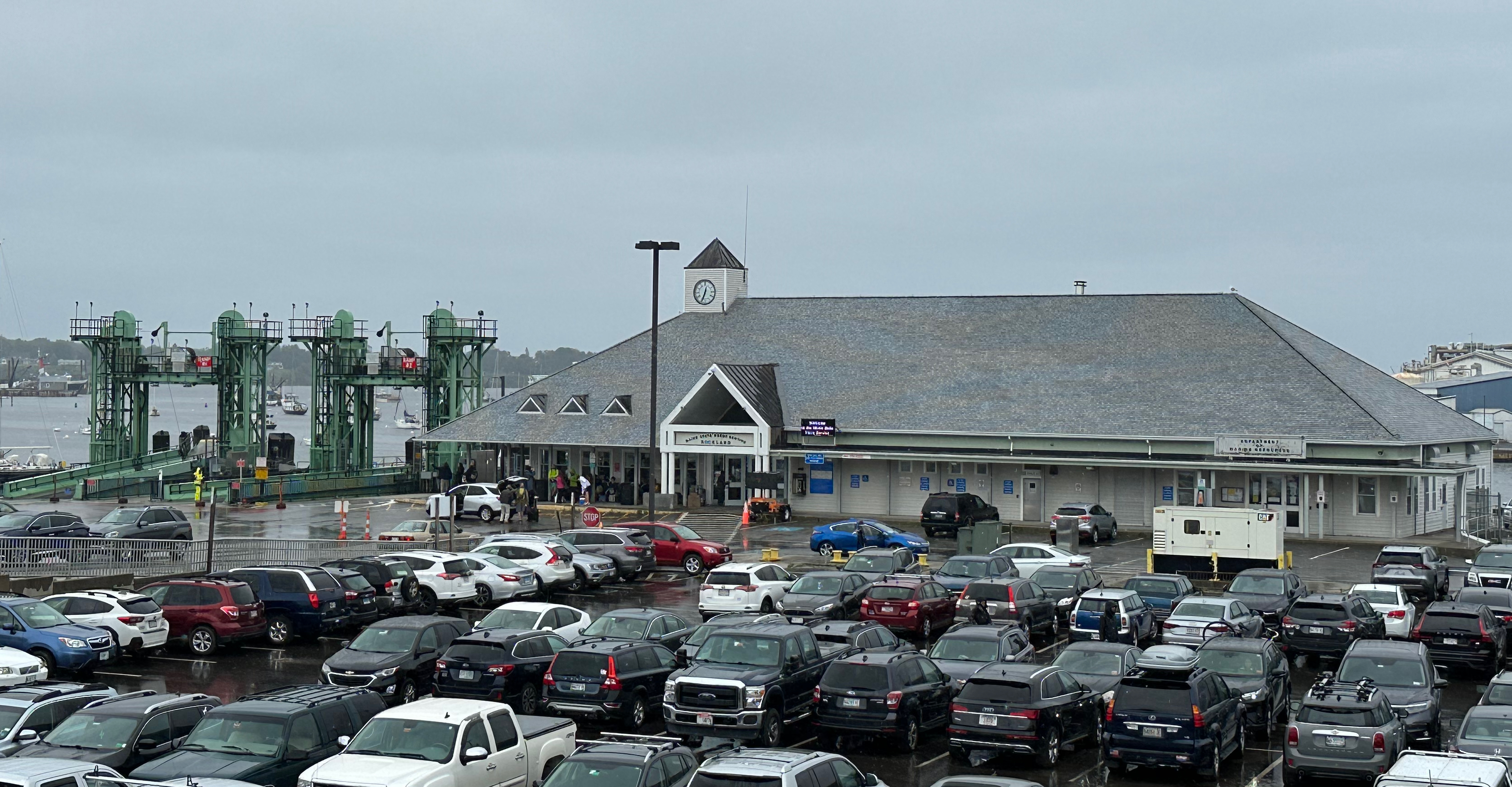
- The terminal in July 2023

General information
- Location: 517A Main Street; Rockland, ME 04841
- Coordinates: 44.10739°N 69.10808°W
- Transit authority: Maine State Ferry Service
- Connections: Concord Coach Lines

Construction
- Parking: Yes

Other information
- Station code: ROD (Amtrak)
- Website: https://www.maine.gov/mdot/ferry/rockland/
Location

Rockland Ferry Terminal is a public ferry terminal and intercity bus stop in Rockland, Maine. It is the mainland terminus for ferries to three island communities in Penobscot Bay: Vinalhaven, North Haven and Matinicus. Concord Coach Lines provides bus service to Portland, Bangor, Boston, and nearby towns.

State law requires the Maine Department of Transportation to operate the ferry routes as part of the Maine State Ferry Service. Ferries to Vinalhaven and North Haven depart several times per day, year-round. Matinicus sees 12 to 36 departures spread throughout the year. These islands are popular summer colonies that often see their populations quadruple during the tourist season. All ferries allow passengers, bicycles, motor vehicles, and freight. Reservations are recommended for cars and trucks.

== History ==
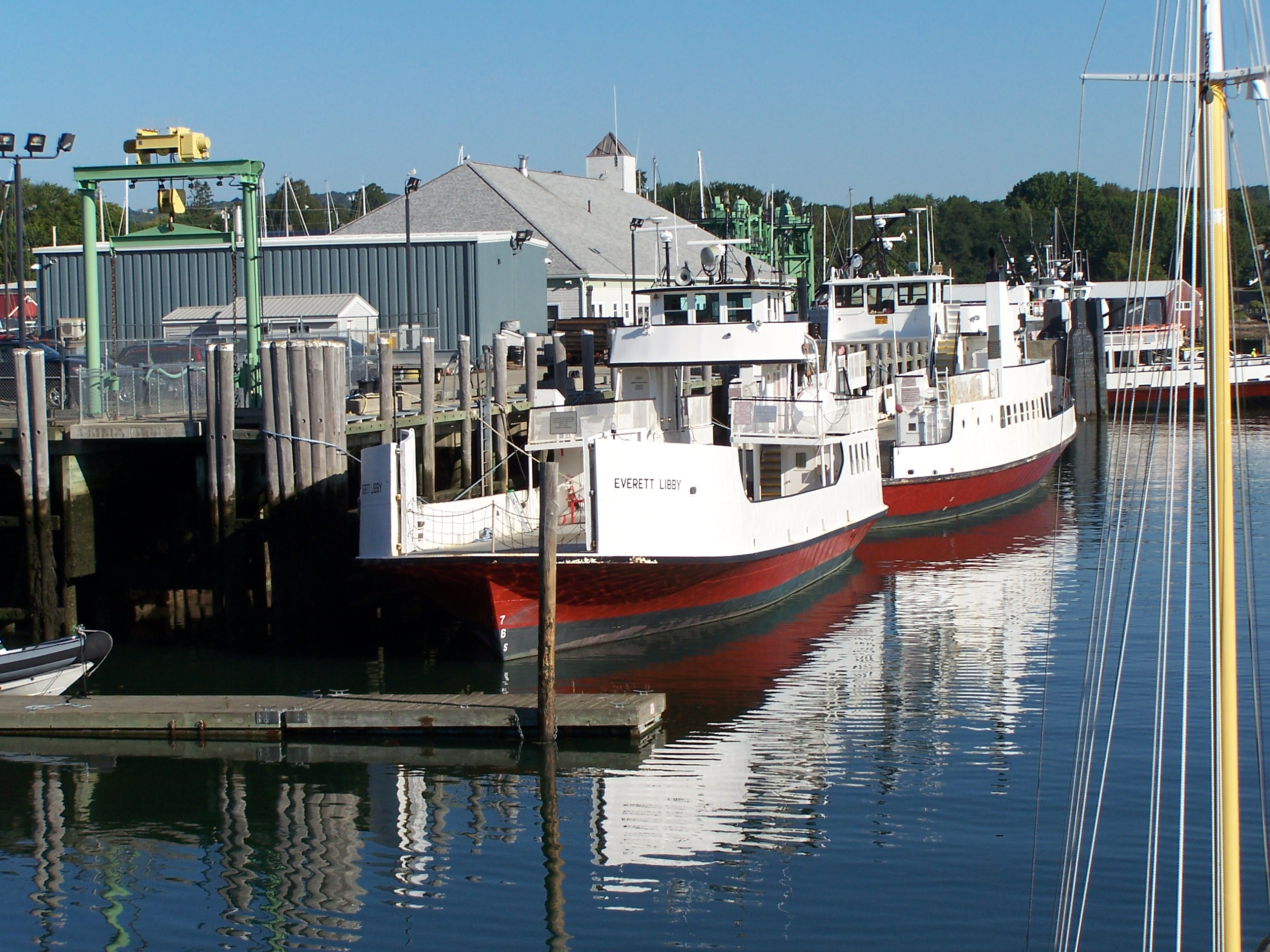
The M/V Everett Libby docked at Rockland Terminal

In December 1958, the Maine Port Authority (MPA) solicited bids for construction of a new ferry terminal in Rockland. The following month, the Rockland City Council granted approval for the MPA to build a new slip at the site for use by the Vinalhaven ferry. Though harbormaster Bertram Snow warned the new slip would be vulnerable to storm damage, the MPA agreed to accept the liability.

The current terminal building was built in the mid-1990s.

In August 2011, a man accidentally drove a car through the outer wall of the terminal building, causing a minor injury.

In March 2012, the Captain E. Frank Thompson was delivered to Rockland Terminal to serve on the Vinalhaven route, replacing the Governor Curtis. The 154-foot (47 m), 494-short-ton (448,000 kg) vessel was built by C&G Boatworks in Mobile, Alabama, on a $9.25 million contract. It was the first addition to the Maine State Ferry Service fleet in 19 years. The Governor Curtis was retained as a backup ferry and has been used when other vessels experience mechanical issues.

In a fall 2012 project, workers installed an automated ticketing system for the parking lot and backup generators for the motorized ferry ramps. A fall 2018 project added 12 parking spaces, upgraded the drainage system, and improved the traffic flow.

In March 2020, in response to the COVID-19 pandemic, the North Haven Select Board voted to block non-full-time residents from traveling to the island on the ferry. In March 2021, the terminal building was closed for several days after an employee tested positive for COVID-19, though ferry service was not suspended.

== Ferry routes ==
Mainland terminus	Island terminus	Vessel(s)	Distance	Time
Rockland	Vinalhaven	Captain Charles Philbrook, Captain E. Frank Thompson	15 mi (24 km)	1:15
Rockland	North Haven	Captain Neal Burgess	12.5 mi (20.1 km)	1:10
Rockland	Matinicus Isle	M/V Everett Libby	23 mi (37 km)	2:15

== Transit connections ==
Concord Coach Lines serves the terminal, providing year-round intercity bus service on a route between Boston South Station and Bangor. The stop is part of the Amtrak Thruway network—riders can make ticketed transfers between the bus and the Downeaster at Portland Transportation Center.
