= Rockland Branch =

Railway line in Maine

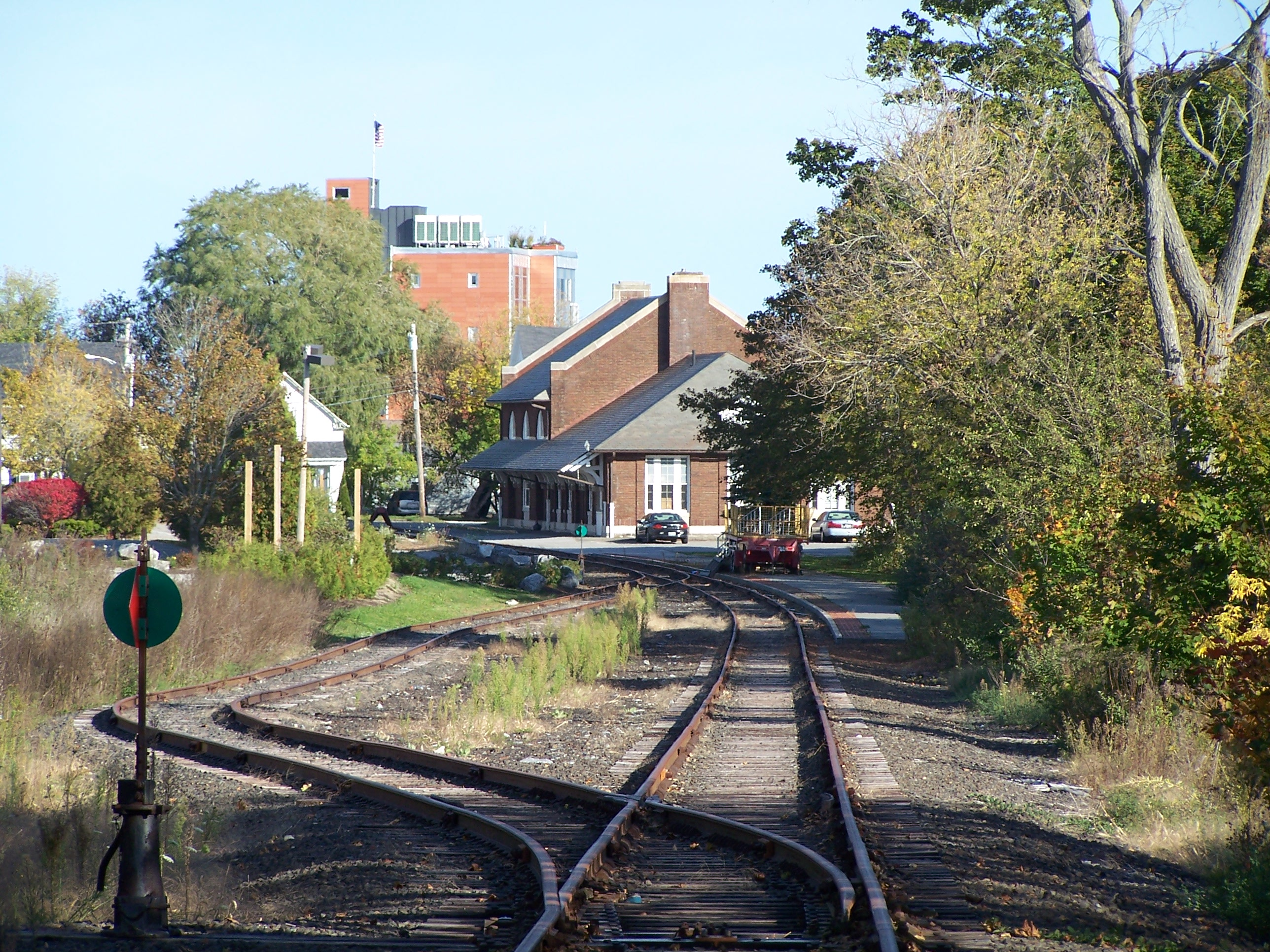
- The eastern terminus of the Rockland Branch at Rockland station

Overview
- Owner: State of Maine

Service
- Operators: Cumberland and Knox Railroad (2025-present) Former operators: Kennebec and Portland Railroad (1849-1864; known as Portland and Kennebec Railroad 1864-1874); Knox and Lincoln Railroad (1871-1891; merged into MEC in 1901); Maine Central Railroad (1874-1981); Guilford Transportation Industries (1981-1990); Maine Coast Railroad (1990-2000); Safe Handling Rail (2000-2003); Maine Eastern Railroad (2003-2015); Central Maine & Quebec Railway (2016-2020); Canadian Pacific Railway (2020-2022); Midcoast Railservice (2022-2024)

History
- Opened: 1849
- Brunswick–Bath opens: 1849
- Woolwich–Rockland opens: October 30, 1871
- Carlton Bridge opens: 1927

Technical
- Line length: 56.7 mi (91.2 km)
- Track gauge: 1,435 mm (4 ft 8 1/2 in) standard gauge

The Rockland Branch is a railway line in the United States. It runs 57 miles (92 km) from Brunswick, Maine, to Rockland, Maine. It was built in stages between 1849 and 1871 by predecessors of the Maine Central Railroad. Today, the state of Maine owns the branch. The current operator is the Cumberland and Knox Railroad, which began operation in May 2025.

== History ==
The oldest part of the Rockland Branch is the 8.5-mile (13.7 km) section between Brunswick, Maine, and Bath, Maine. This was built in 1849 by the Kennebec and Portland Railroad, as part of a line that was later extended to Portland, Maine. The Knox and Lincoln Railroad was chartered that same year to build east from Bath to Rockland, Maine. The line opened between Woolwich, Maine, across the Kennebec River from Bath, and Rockland on October 31, 1871. A train ferry connected Bath and Woolwich.

The Maine Central Railroad acquired the Portland and Kennebec Railroad, successor to the Kennebec and Portland Railroad, in 1874. After several overtures, it leased the Knox and Lincoln Railroad in 1891 and acquired it outright in 1901. Under Maine Central control, the line between Brunswick and Rockland became known as the Rockland Branch. The Maine Central purchased the Samoset destination hotel in Rockland in 1911, and offered direct passenger service for summer visitors from the large eastern cities. The completion of the Carlton Bridge over the Kennebec River in 1927 finally created an all-rail route to Rockland.

The Maine Central sold the Samoset hotel in 1941 and discontinued passenger service to Rockland on April 4, 1959. The Maine Central itself became a subsidiary of Guilford Transportation Industries in 1981. The state of Maine acquired the branch between Bath and Rockland in 1987. The Maine Coast Railroad began freight service over the branch on October 26, 1990. The state acquired the remaining part of the branch between Brunswick and Bath on February 26, 1991.

The Maine Coast Railroad ended service on December 4, 2000. Safe Handling Rail took over as interim operator of the line. The state selected the Morristown and Erie Railway as the new operator in October 2003, who in turn incorporated the Maine Eastern Railroad. The Central Maine and Quebec Railway replaced the Maine Eastern as the operator in 2016.

In 2019, Canadian Pacific Railway agreed to purchase the Central Maine and Quebec, thereby inheriting the operation of the Rockland Branch. The acquisition was completed on June 3, 2020, and the Canadian Pacific took over as operator. The Finger Lakes Railway subsidiary Midcoast Railservice succeeded the Canadian Pacific on August 1, 2022.

On August 16, 2024, Midcoast Railservice filed a petition to discontinue service on the line. This is due to the closure of their main customer, Dragon Cement, closed their plant on the line. According to Midcoast, the line was operating at a loss, generating only 5 cars per month. The Cumberland and Knox Railroad began operations on May 31, 2025.

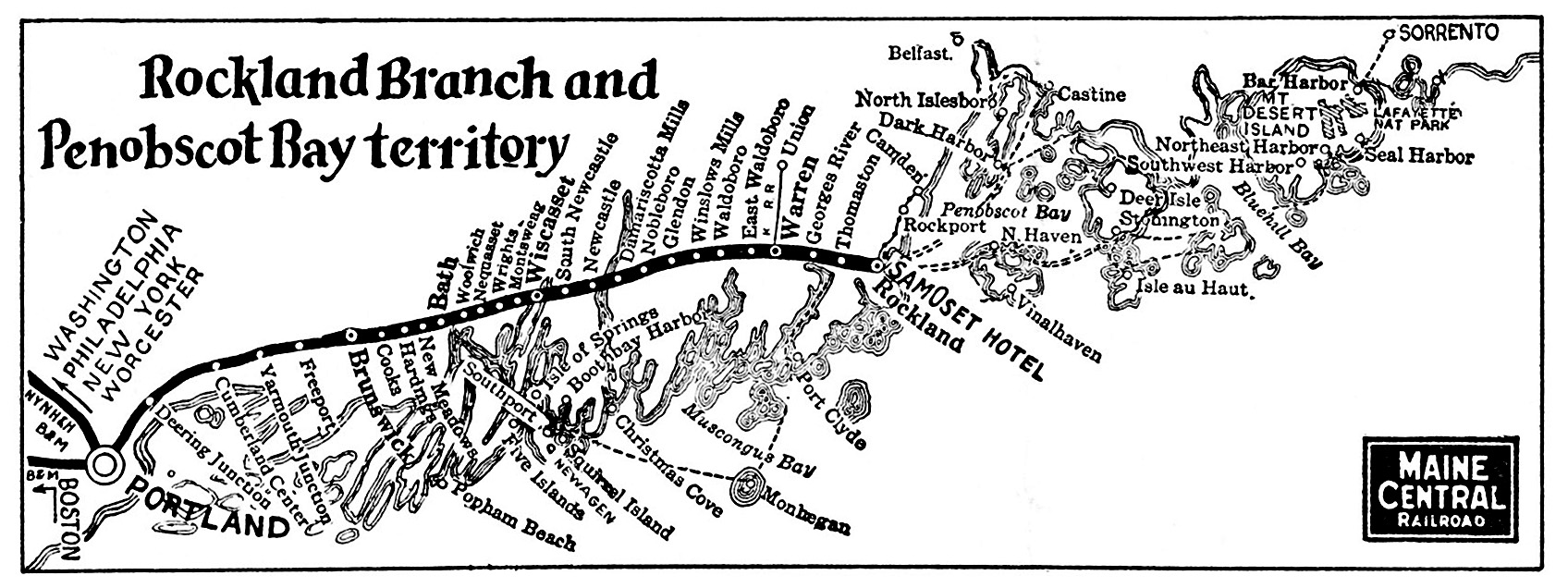
Map of the MEC Rockland Branch in 1920.

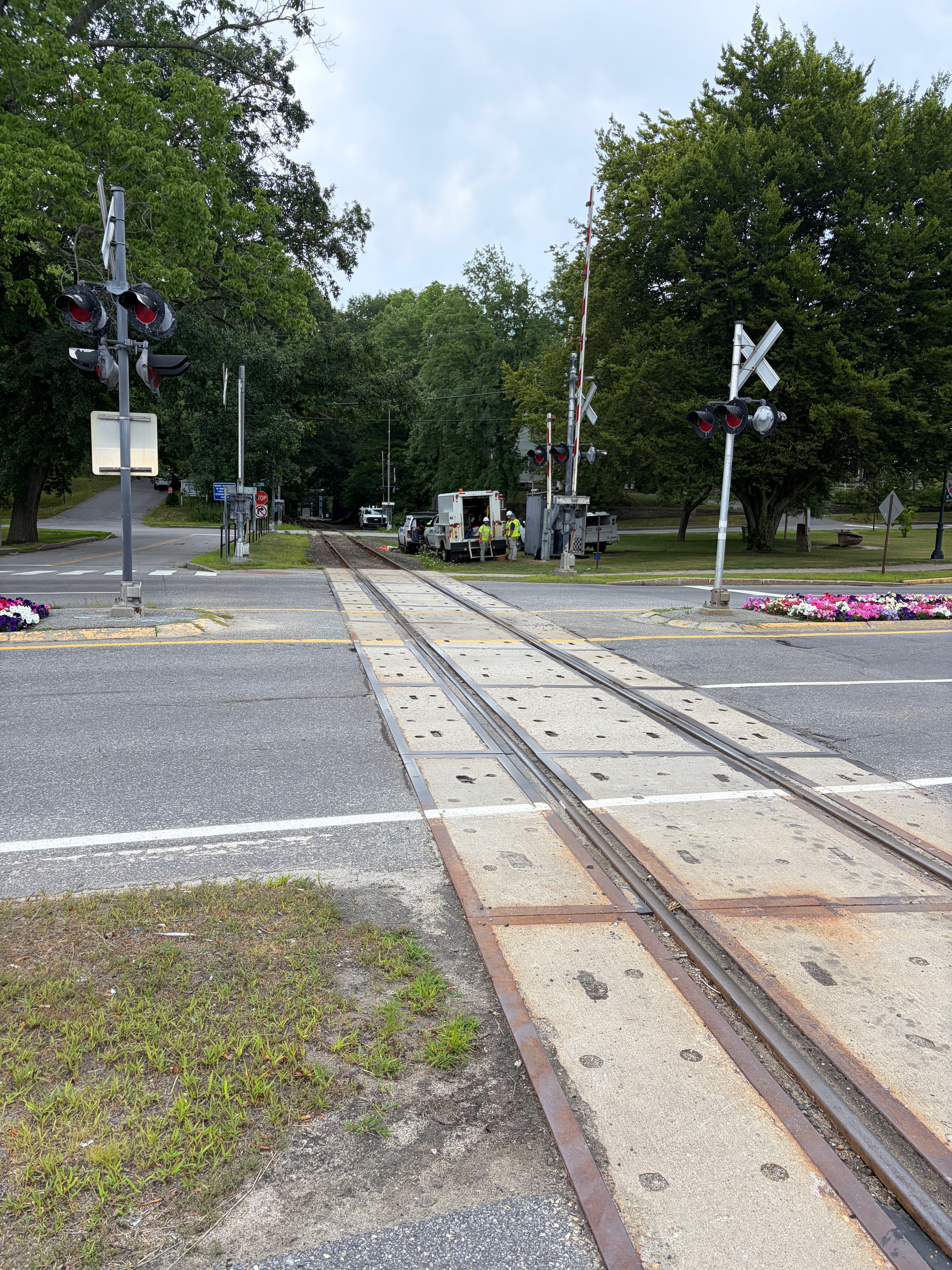
The line crossing Brunswick's Maine Street (foreground) and Park Row, a few yards east of Brunswick station.
