= Delta Southern Railroad =

Overview
- Headquarters: Tallulah, Louisiana
- Reporting mark: DSRR
- Locale: Arkansas and Louisiana
- Dates of operation: 1991–present

Technical
- Track gauge: 4 ft 8 1/2 in (1,435 mm) standard gauge
- Length: 51 miles (82 km)

Delta Southern Railroad Company (reporting mark DSRR) is a Class III short-line railroad headquartered in Tallulah, Louisiana, United States.

DSRR operates two disconnected lines, both of which interchange with Union Pacific:

- A 14-mile line from Monroe, Louisiana, to Sterlington, Louisiana
- A 37-mile line from Tallulah, Louisiana to Talla Bena, Louisiana. The line north of this is currently the subject of litigation between DSR and several entities in Louisiana and Arkansas regarding what they consider to be DSR's refusal to rehabilitate the line to make service operational to Lake Providence, Louisiana and the Port of Lake Providence, and ultimately to McGehee, Arkansas via adjoining track; the Port has filed a feeder line application with the Surface Transportation Board to acquire the line in controversy.
