= Maine Eastern Railroad =

American railroad

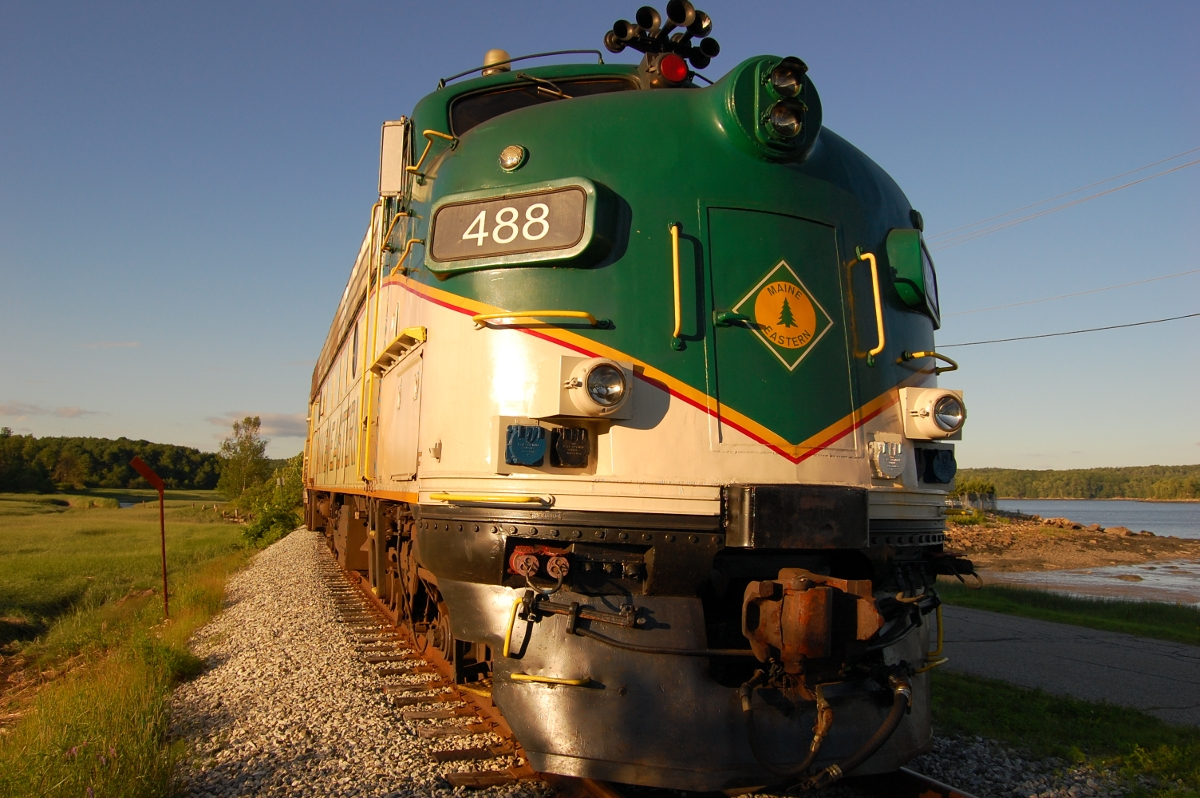
- Maine Eastern 488, ex-Amtrak 239, nee-New Haven 2016

Overview
- Headquarters: Rockland
- Reporting mark: MERR
- Locale: Maine
- Dates of operation: 2003–2015

Technical
- Track gauge: 4 ft 8 1/2 in (1,435 mm) standard gauge
- Length: Approx. 57 mi. (Rockland Branch)

Other
- Website: maineeasternrailroad.com

Maine Eastern Railroad (reporting mark MERR) was a railroad that operated in coastal Maine, between Brunswick and Rockland, on the former Maine Central Rockland Branch rail line. Maine Eastern passenger trains connected with the Amtrak Downeaster passenger train and Pan Am Railways at Brunswick station. The state of Maine did not renew the operating contract with MERR, which effectively ended operations at the end of 2015.

== History ==
Maine Eastern was a subsidiary of the Morristown & Erie Railway of New Jersey, who won the bid to operate the line in 2003. MERR provided freight service year-round, and passenger service seasonally between Brunswick and Rockland with former New Haven/Amtrak EMD FL-9 locomotives and stainless steel streamlined passenger cars. The Maine Eastern was the successor to Safe Handling Rail, which took over operation of the MaineDOT-owned line when the Maine Coast Railroad chose not to bid on a new contract. In September 2015, the Maine Department of Transportation selected the Central Maine and Quebec Railway (CMQ) to operate the line beginning on January 1, 2016. In 2020, the CMQ would be acquired by the Canadian Pacific Railway, which then absorbed the CMQ into their rail system.

Commodities moved in freight service include cement, plate steel, and perlite.

In February 2018, the Northern New England Passenger Rail Authority voted to conduct a three-weekend pilot passenger service along the line during the summer. However, Amtrak later announced that this plan would be cancelled due to time constraints in the execution of their risk-assessment plan for the rail line. Despite the cancellation, Amtrak, along with the Northern New England Passenger Rail Authority, Maine Department of Transportation and the Central Maine and & Quebec Railroad, made a test run to Rockland on August 14, 2019.

Finger Lakes Railway proposed a private alternative to this extension in January 2022. Under the plan, their subsidiary Midcoast Rail Service would operate a rail shuttle to Rockland that would have timed transfers with the Downeaster in Brunswick. One daily round trip would run year-round, unlike in Amtrak's seasonal proposal. Two daily round trips would run on summer weekends.

== Rolling stock ==
The MERR roster consisted of a former Canadian National MLW M-420s numbered 3573, and a RRPX Railroad Power Leasing Electro Motive Division GP9, numbered 764. These two locomotives were normally used for freight service, but would fill in for an FL9 if needed. For passenger operations, the MERR operated a pair of ex-Amtrak EMD F40PHs that still carried their original Amtrak numbers 265 and 291. These only ran for the 2004 season and would be replaced with ex-New Haven EMD FL-9 locomotives, 488 and 489. Both FL9s were sold to Webb Rail in 2020.

== Bibliography ==
- Solomon, Brian (2017). North American Locomotives (1st ed.). Crestline Books. ISBN 978-0-7858-3533-2.
