= Finger Lakes Railway =

Class III railroad in New York, US

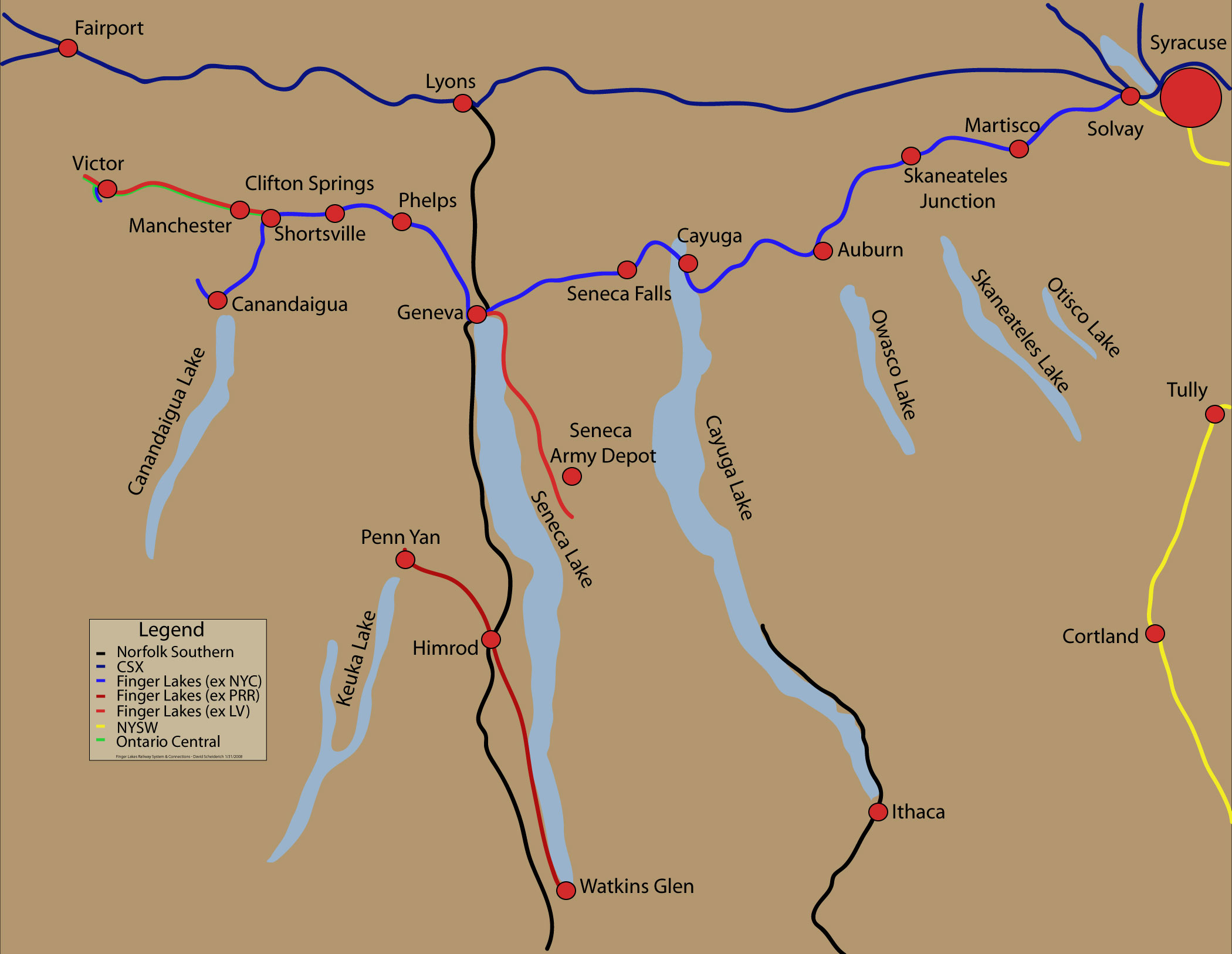

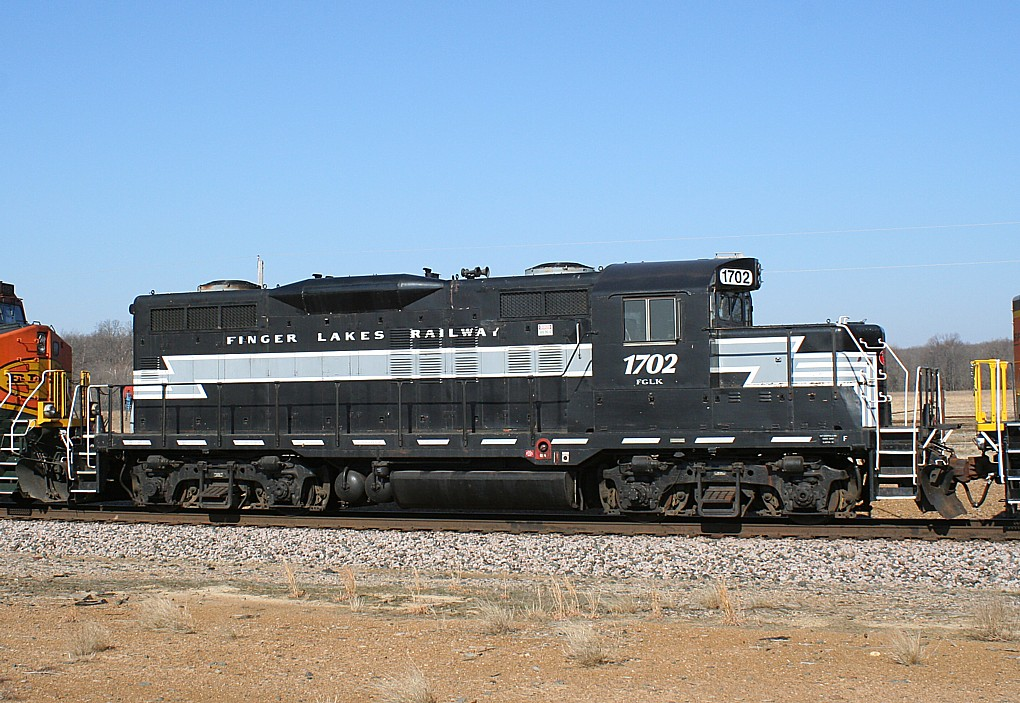
- FGLK #1702, an EMD GP9.

Overview
- Headquarters: Geneva, New York
- Reporting mark: FGLK
- Locale: New York
- Dates of operation: 1995–present

Technical
- Track gauge: 4 ft 8 1/2 in (1,435 mm)
- Length: 167 mi (269 km)

Other
- Website: http://www.fingerlakesrail.com

The Finger Lakes Railway (reporting mark FGLK) is a Class III railroad in the Finger Lakes region of New York. The company began operations on July 23, 1995, and operates in Onondaga, Cayuga, Seneca, Ontario, Schuyler and Yates counties. The FGLK operates 13 diesel locomotives on 167 miles (269 km) of ex-Conrail trackage, formerly owned by the New York Central Railroad, the Pennsylvania Railroad and the Lehigh Valley Railroad. Between 2001 and 2013, the railroad operated a heritage railroad known as the Finger Lakes Scenic Railway which offered passenger train excursions.

== Routes ==
=== Main line ===
FGLK main route runs from Syracuse to Canandaigua, New York, over a distance of 76 miles. Once part of the New York Central Railroad and known as the Auburn Road, it dates all the way back to the Auburn and Syracuse Railroad.

At Syracuse, New York the FGLK interchanges with CSX Transportation and the New York, Susquehanna and Western Railway (NYSW). Travelling west, the line passes through Solvay, Camillus, Skaneateles Junction (also known as Hartlot or Skaneateles Falls), Sennett, Auburn, Aurelius (Station name Relius), Cayuga, Seneca Falls and Waterloo. At Geneva, New York, there is a connection with Norfolk Southern Railway's Corning Secondary.

Continuing west, the line passes through Phelps Junction and Clifton Springs. In Shortsville, the railroad comes to the terminus of the Ontario Central Railroad. The line ends at Canandaigua.

=== Branch line to Kendaia/Romulus ===
The FGLK operates a portion of the ex-Lehigh Valley Railroad mainline from Geneva to Kendaia, running south on the east side of Seneca Lake. This was the Lehigh Valley's mainline from Waverly, New York, to Buffalo, New York. This line saw much action during World War II and the Cold War, with many military movements in and out of the Seneca Army Depot, until it closed in the summer of 1998. The now-closed base has a very large yard which at current time is used for rail car storage by the Finger Lakes Railway. The local industrial development agency works to attract new industries to locate at the abandoned depot because of the rail infrastructure.

=== Branch line from Penn Yan to Watkins Glen ===
The Penn Yan, New York, branch was once part of the Pennsylvania Railroad. Only a small section of this line extends from Watkins Glen to Bellona. To get to this line, the Finger Lakes Railway uses trackage rights over Norfolk Southern's Corning Secondary from Geneva to Himrod Junction, which is in the middle of the branch, from Penn Yan in the north to Watkins Glen, New York in the south.

=== Ontario Central ===
FGLK acquired the Ontario Central Railroad in October, 2007. Previously, the line had been owned by the Livonia, Avon and Lakeville Railroad. It consists of 13.3 miles (21.4 km) of ex-Lehigh Valley trackage that was part of the Sayre-Buffalo mainline that also makes up the Kendaia branch. The two railroads connect near Shortsville, New York.

=== Midcoast Railservice ===
Between August 1, 2022 & Mid-June 2024, Finger Lakes Railway subsidiary Midcoast Railservice operates the state-owned line between Brunswick, Maine and Rockland, Maine for three years.

== History of Freight service ==
The Finger Lakes Railway is predominantly a freight company. It was founded by three shortline railroad entrepreneurs, former Boston & Maine Railroad managers, Cynthia O’Connor and Michael Smith (Retired October 2024), and George Betke, Chairman of Farmrail with funding from Genesee & Wyoming.

FGLK handles about 18,000 cars of freight each year. It handles a large variety of goods serving the local agricultural and manufacturing industries. The main cargo includes plastic, clay, grain, stone, lumber and paper products, scrap steel, chemical substances, finished steel, salt, sand, soda ash, paper, potash, fertilizer, beer, phosphorus fertilizer, telephone poles and aluminum ingots, Lead waste. The Finger Lakes Railway interchanges with the Class I railroads CSX and Norfolk Southern, with connections to Canadian Pacific via Norfolk Southern. Direct Limited interchange of agricultural products is permitted between New York Susquehanna & Western Railroad in Solvay, NY.

== Heritage railroad passenger excursion trains ==
The FGLK once operated a passenger excursion service, The Finger Lakes Scenic Railway, as a heritage railroad. Operations began in October, 2001 with four coaches having been purchased second-hand from Via Rail in late 1999. The cars arrived in the winter of 1999 after the seats were replaced. Operation of the excursions ended in mid-2013.

When the excursions were being run, they included both general scenic and also seasonally-themed trips.

In 2023, FGLK was again operating passenger excursions.

A new tourist rail experience, in collaboration with multiple partners, was launched in the Summer of 2025.
