= Maine Department of Transportation =

State government agency

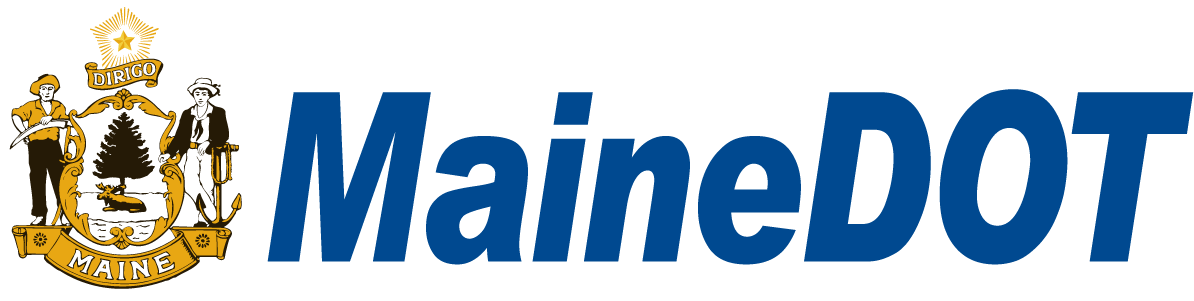

Agency overview
- Formed: 1972
- Jurisdiction: State of Maine
- Headquarters: 24 Child Street, Augusta, Maine 04330
- Website: maine.gov/dot

The Maine Department of Transportation, also known as MaineDOT, is the office of state government charged with the regulation and maintenance of roads, rail, ferries, and other public transport infrastructure in the state of Maine. An exception is the Maine Turnpike, which is maintained by the Maine Turnpike Authority. MaineDOT reports on the adequacy of roads, highways, and bridges in Maine. It also monitors environmental factors that affect the motor public such as stormwater, ice/snow buildup on roads, and crashes with moose. MaineDOT was founded in 1972 and replaced the former Maine State Highway Commission.

== Organization ==
MaineDOT is an agency that consists of several offices:

- Bureau of Planning
- Bureau of Maintenance and Operations
- Office of Passenger Transportation
- Office of Freight Transportation
- Office of Communications
- Bureau of Project Development
- Capital Resource Management
- Transportation Service Center
- Environmental Office
- Office of Legal Services and Internal Audit
- Safety Office
- Contract Procurement Office
- Office of Engineering Quality and Oversight

=== Road ===
See List of Maine State Routes, Interstate 95 in Maine, U.S. Route 1 in Maine and U.S. Route 2 in Maine.

=== Rail ===
MaineDOT owns hundreds of miles of railway track in the state, much of it acquired as the result of abandonment of rail on unprofitable lines by private carriers. The state does not itself operate a railway, instead leasing lines or engaging private contractors to operate on state-owned rails:

- Former Bangor and Aroostook Railroad line abandoned by Montreal, Maine and Atlantic Railway:
  - Madawaska to Millinocket, 233 miles (375 km) now state-owned / Irving-operated Maine Northern Railway
- Former Belfast and Moosehead Lake Railroad line:
  - 30 miles (48 km) of heritage line in Waldo County operating as Belfast & Moosehead Lake Railway
- Former Maine Central lines abandoned by Guilford:
  - Calais Branch from Bangor to Calais: mostly abandoned, but MaineDOT leases a 10-mile (16 km) segment between Brewer and Ellsworth to the Downeast Scenic Railroad.
  - Rockland Branch from Brunswick to Rockland. MaineDOT awarded a lease to the Maine Switching Service, operating the Cumberland and Knox Railroad, in January 2025. Freight operations on the branch began in May 2025.

In 2012, MaineDOT sought an operator to restore passenger service on St. Lawrence and Atlantic Railroad tracks to Lewiston and Auburn, Maine."

=== Ferry ===
Maine state law requires MaineDOT to operate regular ferry routes, known as the Maine State Ferry Service, to specific island localities along Maine's Atlantic coast. All ferries can carry passengers, vehicles, and freight. As of 2021, the service consists of six routes.

Mainland terminus	Island terminus	Vessel(s)	Distance	Time
Rockland Ferry Terminal, Rockland	Vinalhaven	Captain Richard G. Spear, Captain E. Frank Thompson	15 mi (24 km)	1:15
Rockland Ferry Terminal, Rockland	North Haven	Captain Neal Burgess	12.5 mi (20.1 km)	1:10
Rockland Ferry Terminal, Rockland	Matinicus Isle	M/V Everett Libby	23 mi (37 km)	2:15
Lincolnville	Islesboro	Margaret Chase Smith	3 mi (4.8 km)	0:20
Bass Harbor	Swan's Island	M/V Captain Henry Lee	6 mi (9.7 km)	0:40
Bass Harbor	Frenchboro	M/V Captain Henry Lee	8.25 mi (13.28 km)	0:50

The law also provides for the Maine State Ferry Service Advisory Board, which is charged with advising MaineDOT on all ferry-related matters and recommending changes via an annual report, as well as naming MaineDOT's ferry vessels and terminals. The board is composed of one member from each island served by the ferries and three members appointed by the Commissioner of Transportation, each with two-year terms.

Besides MaineDOT, coastal Maine is served by a number of other private and public ferry operators. A notable example is Casco Bay Lines, a non-profit created by emergency state legislation in 1981 to maintain ferry service between Portland and islands in the neighboring Casco Bay.

== See also ==
- Public transportation in Maine

== Sources ==
- Working with the MaineDOT: A Guide for Municipal Officials
