= Rockland, Maine =

City in Maine, United States

- City
- Aerial view of downtown

- Seal
- Nickname(s): The Lime City, Lobster Capital of the World
- Motto: "God Gives a Reward to Industry"
- Location in Knox County and the state of Maine.
- Coordinates: 44°07′30″N 69°07′54″W
- Country: United States
- State: Maine
- County: Knox
- Incorporated (town): July 28, 1848
- Incorporated (city): 1854

Area
  - Total: 15.08 sq mi (39.05 km^{2})
  - Land: 12.85 sq mi (33.28 km^{2})
  - Water: 2.23 sq mi (5.77 km^{2})
- Elevation: 184 ft (56 m)

Population (2020)
  - Total: 6,936
  - Density: 539.8/sq mi (208.42/km^{2})
- Time zone: UTC−5 (Eastern (EST))
  - Summer (DST): UTC−4 (EDT)
- ZIP code: 04841
- Area code: 207
- FIPS code: 23-63590
- GNIS feature ID: 582698
- Website: rocklandmaine.gov

Rockland is a city in and the county seat of Knox County, Maine, United States. As of the 2020 census, the town population was 6,936. The city is a popular tourist destination. It is a departure point for the Maine State Ferry Service to the islands of Penobscot Bay: Vinalhaven, North Haven and Matinicus.

== History ==
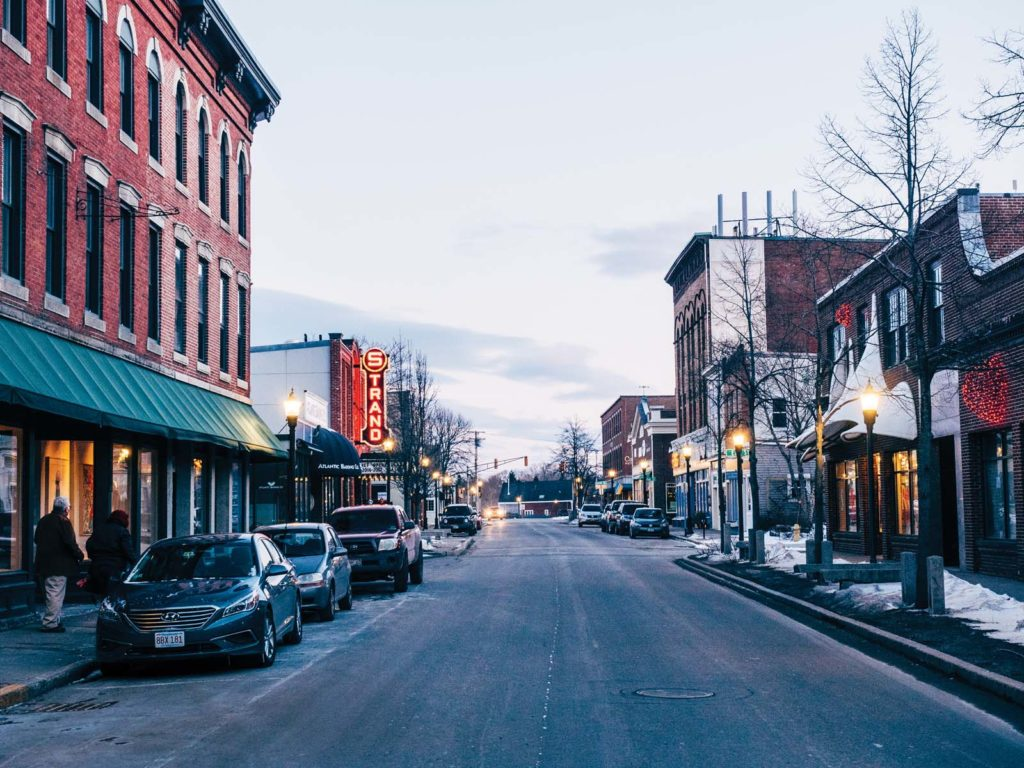
Rockland Downtown

=== Early settlement ===
In 1767, John Lermond and his two brothers from Warren established a lumber operation, building a camp to produce oak staves and pine lumber. The area became known as Lermond's Cove and was first permanently settled around 1769. When Thomaston was incorporated in 1777, Lermond's Cove became a district called Shore Village.

=== Incorporation and municipal development ===
On July 28, 1848, the area was set off from Thomaston as the town of East Thomaston. The community was renamed Rockland in 1850, reflecting its prominent limestone cliffs, and was chartered as a city in 1854.

=== Industrial boom ===
==== Lime industry dominance ====
Rockland developed rapidly due to its abundant limestone deposits and strategic coastal location. By 1854, the city operated twelve lime quarries and 125 lime kilns, making it the leading lime producer in the United States. The industry employed over 1,000 workers by 1886, with upwards of 300 vessels transporting the mineral to ports throughout the country.

==== Shipbuilding and maritime commerce ====
Shipbuilding flourished alongside the lime industry. In 1854 alone, Rockland built eleven ships, three barks, six brigs, and four schooners. The city maintained three or more shipyards, a marine railway, five sail lofts, and two boatbuilders. Maritime activity centered around fleets of Friendship Sloops that sailed between the harbor and fishing grounds across Penobscot Bay.

==== Labor movement origins ====
In March 1877, the Granite Cutters' International Union was formed in Rockland, becoming one of the earliest craft unions in the United States. The organization emerged from the region's growing granite industry, which employed skilled stoneworkers alongside the dominant lime operations.

==== Diversified manufacturing ====
By 1886, Rockland supported diverse industries beyond lime and shipbuilding, including three grain mills, two foundries, three carriage factories, six lumber mills, two machine shops, three cooperies, one tannery, four granite and marble works, two boot and shoe factories, and four printing offices.

=== Tourism development ===
The opening of the Knox and Lincoln Railroad in 1871 transformed Rockland into a tourist destination. Hotels and inns were established to accommodate visitors, culminating in the construction of The Bay Point Hotel in 1889. Located near the breakwater with commanding views of Penobscot Bay, the luxury resort offered extensive amenities and entertainment. Renamed The Samoset Hotel in 1902, it operated successfully until the Great Depression. The rise of automobile travel reduced dependence on rail service, leading to the hotel's closure in 1969 and destruction by fire in 1972. A new Samoset Resort opened in 1974.

=== 20th century transitions ===
==== Naval connections ====
In 1915, the super-dreadnought USS Nevada (BB-36) conducted sea trials and testing operations off Rockland's coast, demonstrating the city's continued importance to maritime activities.

==== Economic transformation ====
Beginning in the early 1990s, Rockland underwent significant economic restructuring, shifting from traditional fishing and industrial activities toward service industries and tourism. The downtown area was revitalized with unique shops, restaurants, art galleries, and cultural institutions. This transformation established Rockland as the commercial center of midcoast Maine.

=== Modern era ===
==== Cultural renaissance ====
Rockland emerged as a significant cultural center, anchored by institutions such as the Farnsworth Art Museum and the Center for Maine Contemporary Art. The city developed a reputation for fine dining, artisan businesses, and cultural events that attract visitors from throughout New England.

==== Contemporary recognition ====
Rockland was designated an official micropolitan area and received recognition as a Coast Guard City in March 2008, acknowledging the long-standing relationship between the community and the United States Coast Guard.

==== Housing initiatives ====
Addressing the regional housing crisis that has affected midcoast Maine, Rockland became the first Maine municipality to authorize borrowing for affordable housing development. In June 2025, voters approved a $10 million bond by a margin of 352 to 250, enabling the city to provide low-interest loans, acquire property, and fund infrastructure improvements to support affordable and workforce housing. The initiative aims to add 50 housing units annually for ten years, targeting the "missing middle" of residents who earn too much to qualify for low-income programs but cannot afford market-rate housing. Concurrent affordable housing projects include the Firefly Field development by Midcoast Habitat for Humanity, which uses volunteer labor and innovative partnerships to build homes at approximately $200 per square foot, significantly below typical construction costs.

== Geography ==
According to the United States Census Bureau, the city has a total area of 15.07 square miles (39.03 km^{2}), of which 12.84 square miles (33.26 km^{2}) is land and 2.23 square miles (5.78 km^{2}) is water. Rockland is located on Penobscot Bay and the Gulf of Maine, part of the Atlantic Ocean. About ten miles to the east are the islands of North Haven and Vinalhaven, reached by ferry from Rockland.

Rockland is crossed by U.S. 1 and 1A, and state routes 17, 73 and 90. It borders the towns of Owls Head to the southeast, Thomaston to the southwest, Warren to the northwest, and Rockport to the northeast.

=== Climate ===
The coldest month is January and the warmest month is July.

Climate data for Rockland, Maine
Month	Jan	Feb	Mar	Apr	May	Jun	Jul	Aug	Sep	Oct	Nov	Dec	Year
Record high °F (°C)	58 (14)	61 (16)	74 (23)	80 (27)	95 (35)	94 (34)	96 (36)	93 (34)	90 (32)	82 (28)	74 (23)	63 (17)	96 (36)
Mean daily maximum °F (°C)	30 (−1)	33 (1)	40 (4)	52 (11)	62 (17)	71 (22)	76 (24)	76 (24)	68 (20)	57 (14)	47 (8)	36 (2)	54 (12)
Daily mean °F (°C)	20 (−7)	24 (−4)	31 (−1)	43 (6)	53 (12)	62 (17)	68 (20)	67 (19)	59 (15)	48 (9)	39 (4)	27 (−3)	45 (7)
Mean daily minimum °F (°C)	10 (−12)	14 (−10)	22 (−6)	33 (1)	43 (6)	53 (12)	59 (15)	58 (14)	50 (10)	39 (4)	30 (−1)	18 (−8)	36 (2)
Record low °F (°C)	−22 (−30)	−20 (−29)	−11 (−24)	10 (−12)	21 (−6)	30 (−1)	43 (6)	37 (3)	28 (−2)	19 (−7)	4 (−16)	−25 (−32)	−25 (−32)
Average precipitation inches (mm)	4.26 (108)	4.00 (102)	4.80 (122)	5.02 (128)	4.14 (105)	4.06 (103)	3.43 (87)	3.28 (83)	4.51 (115)	5.14 (131)	5.71 (145)	4.99 (127)	53.34 (1,356)
Source: weather.com

== Demographics ==
Historical population
Census	Pop.	Note	%±
1850	5,052		—
1860	7,316		44.8%
1870	7,074		−3.3%
1880	7,599		7.4%
1890	8,174		7.6%
1900	8,150		−0.3%
1910	8,174		0.3%
1920	8,100		−0.9%
1930	9,075		12.0%
1940	8,899		−1.9%
1950	9,284		4.3%
1960	8,769		−5.5%
1970	8,505		−3.0%
1980	7,919		−6.9%
1990	7,972		0.7%
2000	7,609		−4.6%
2010	7,297		−4.1%
2020	6,936		−4.9%
U.S. Decennial Census

=== 2020 census ===
As of the 2020 census, Rockland had a population of 6,936. The median age was 47.9 years. 15.3% of residents were under the age of 18 and 26.3% of residents were 65 years of age or older. For every 100 females there were 90.7 males, and for every 100 females age 18 and over there were 86.0 males age 18 and over.

94.1% of residents lived in urban areas, while 5.9% lived in rural areas.

There were 3,383 households in Rockland, of which 18.8% had children under the age of 18 living in them. Of all households, 33.6% were married-couple households, 20.8% were households with a male householder and no spouse or partner present, and 34.8% were households with a female householder and no spouse or partner present. About 40.7% of all households were made up of individuals and 18.4% had someone living alone who was 65 years of age or older.

There were 3,907 housing units, of which 13.4% were vacant. The homeowner vacancy rate was 2.0% and the rental vacancy rate was 7.1%.

Racial composition as of the 2020 census
Race	Number	Percent
White	6,381	92.0%
Black or African American	44	0.6%
American Indian and Alaska Native	27	0.4%
Asian	70	1.0%
Native Hawaiian and Other Pacific Islander	2	0.0%
Some other race	72	1.0%
Two or more races	340	4.9%
Hispanic or Latino (of any race)	142	2.0%

=== 2010 census ===
Per the census of 2010, there were 7,297 people, 3,423 households, and 1,744 families living in the city. The population density was 568.3 inhabitants per square mile (219.4/km^{2}). There were 3,925 housing units at an average density of 305.7 per square mile (118.0/km^{2}). The racial makeup of the city was 95.8% White, 0.6% African American, 0.4% Native American, 0.7% Asian, 0.1% Pacific Islander, 0.2% from other races, and 2.2% from two or more races. Hispanic or Latino of any race were 1.3% of the population.

There were 3,423 households, of which 23.1% had children under the age of 18 living with them, 34.2% were married couples living together, 12.6% had a female householder with no husband present, 4.2% had a male householder with no wife present, and 49.1% were non-families. 40.0% of all households were made up of individuals, and 17.4% had someone living alone who was 65 years of age or older. The average household size was 2.06 and the average family size was 2.73.

The median age in the city was 43.5 years. 18.3% of residents were under the age of 18; 8.7% were between the ages of 18 and 24; 24.8% were from 25 to 44; 28.5% were from 45 to 64; and 19.7% were 65 years of age or older. The gender makeup of the city was 46.5% male and 53.5% female.

=== 2000 census ===
As of the census of 2000, there were 7,609 people, 3,434 households, and 1,943 families living in the city. The population density was 589.2 inhabitants per square mile (227.5/km^{2}). There were 3,752 housing units at an average density of 290.5 per square mile (112.2/km^{2}). The racial makeup of the city was 97.90% White, 0.25% African American, 0.24% Native American, 0.57% Asian, 0.03% Pacific Islander, 0.11% from other races, and 0.92% from two or more races. Hispanic or Latino of any race were 0.57% of the population.

There were 3,434 households, out of which 25.2% had children under the age of 18 living with them, 40.4% were married couples living together, 12.9% had a female householder with no husband present, and 43.4% were non-families. 36.3% of all households were made up of individuals, and 16.2% had someone living alone who was 65 years of age or older. The average household size was 2.15 and the average family size was 2.78.

In the city, the population was spread out, with 21.1% under the age of 18, 8.2% from 18 to 24, 27.3% from 25 to 44, 23.8% from 45 to 64, and 19.5% who were 65 years of age or older. The median age was 41 years. For every 100 females, there were 85.6 males. For every 100 females age 18 and over, there were 83.1 males.

The median income for a household in the city was $30,209, and the median income for a family was $37,083. Males had a median income of $27,212 versus $20,708 for females. The per capita income for the city was $16,659. About 10.4% of families and 14.7% of the population were below the poverty line, including 22.2% of those under age 18 and 8.2% of those age 65 or over.

Voter registration

Voter Registration and Party Enrollment as of November 2012
Party	Total Voters	Percentage
Unenrolled	1,732	36.02%
Democratic	1,576	32.77%
Republican	1,294	26.91%
Green Independent	206	4.28%
Total	4,808	100%

== Arts and culture ==
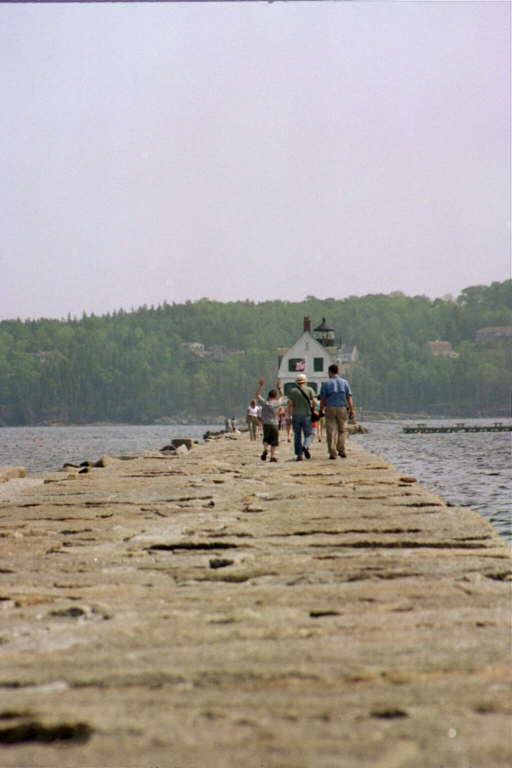
Rockland Breakwater Light

=== Attractions ===
Rockland is home to the Maine Lobster Festival, a celebration held annually in honor of the town's primary export: lobster. In the first week of August, thousands of people come from all over the world to participate in this five-day event. Rockland also is home to the Center for Maine Contemporary Art, designed by internationally recognized architect Toshiko Mori, and the Farnsworth Art Museum, a world-famous art museum containing paintings by Andrew Wyeth and other well-known New England artists. Rockland's main street also features numerous small shops and businesses including coffee shops, book stores, art supply stores, restaurants, organic markets, computer repair and toy stores. Penobscot Bay, which Rockland borders, is known internationally as one of the best recreational sailing grounds in the world. The city's breakwater, built in the 19th century, also draws tourists.

=== Sites of interest ===
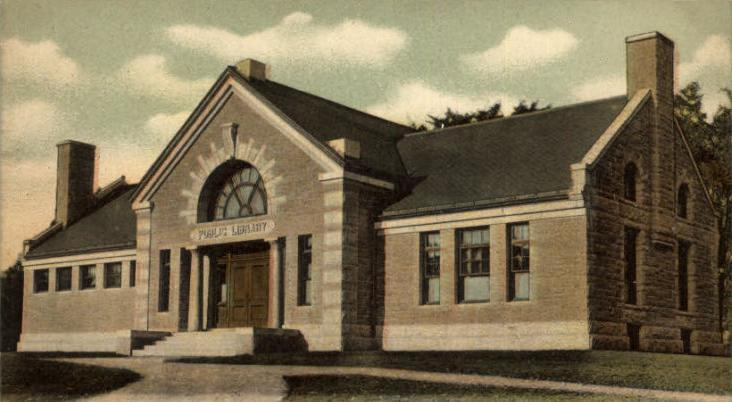
Rockland Public Library, built 1903–1904, is a Carnegie library designed by George Albert Clough

- Rockland Public Library
- Farnsworth Art Museum
- Center for Maine Contemporary Art
- Lincoln Street Center for Arts and Education
- Maine Lighthouse Museum
- Rockland Railroad Station, former terminal of the now-defunct Maine Eastern Railroad
- Maine Lobster Festival
- North Atlantic Blues Festival
- Rockland Breakwater Light
- Rockland Historical Society and Museum
- Sail Power and Steam Museum
- Maine Boats, Homes, and Harbors Show
- University College at Rockland
- The Coastal Children's Museum

== Education ==
It is in the Regional School Unit 13 school district.

Educational institutions include:

- Oceanside High School
- The Apprenticeshop
- Coastal Senior College
- Mid-Coast School of Technology
- Penobscot School
- UMA Rockland Center (formerly University College at Rockland)

The Watershed School in Camden, Maine closed in 2024.

== Infrastructure ==
=== Transportation ===
U.S. Route 1 passes through the county from the west and to the north. Maine State Route 17 goes north from the town, and Maine State Route 73 goes from the town, to the peninsula to the south.

The Maine State Ferry Service operates three ferry routes out of Rockland Ferry Terminal. There are multiple departures per day to Vinalhaven and North Haven, while ferries to Matinicus depart less regularly. Intercity buses operated by Concord Coach Lines also stop at the ferry terminal, with service to Boston, Portland, Brunswick, Bangor, and other nearby towns.

=== Rail ===
Until 1958, the Rockland was the terminus for Maine Central Railroad passenger trains from Portland, along the Rockland Branch from Brunswick. The Maine Central Railroad ran three trains a day on the days besides Sunday and fewer trains on Sunday. In Portland's Union Station, these trains made connections to trains to Boston, New York City, Bangor and the Canadian Maritimes. In the final months, service diminished to one daily except Sunday trip in each direction, until finally discontinuing on April 4, 1959.

From 2003 to 2015, the Maine Eastern Railroad offered seasonal excursion service to Rockland, Maine which connected to Amtrak's Downeaster at Brunswick. In October 2017, the Northern New England Passenger Rail Authority announced plans to extend one weekend Downeaster round trip to Rockland between Memorial Day and Labor Day beginning in 2018. Intermediate stops would be made at Bath, Wiscasset, and Newcastle. As part of preparation, Amtrak, along with the Northern New England Passenger Rail Authority, Maine Department of Transportation and the Central Maine and & Quebec Railroad, made a test run of a train on August 14.

== Notable people ==
- Adelbert Ames, Civil War general, senator and the 27th governor of Mississippi
- Hiram George Berry, Civil War general and first commander of 4th Maine Volunteer Infantry Regiment
- Alton H. Blackington, feature journalist, photojournalist and chronicler of New England; born in Rockland
- William T. Cobb, 46th governor of Maine
- Samuel Collins Jr., state senator and Associate Justice of the Maine Supreme Judicial Court
- Leo Connellan, poet
- Gertrude Elliott, actress
- Maxine Elliott, actress
- David F. Emery, US congressman
- Henry Faller, founder of Uncle Henry's
- Nathan A. Farwell, US senator
- Samuel C. Fessenden, served in the 37th U. S. Congress, served as a judge in Rockland
- Todd Field, Academy Award-nominated filmmaker
- Obadiah Gardner, US senator
- Bo Goldman, Broadway playwright and Oscar-winning screenwriter
- Edward Sturgis Ingraham, educator, publisher, mountaineer
- Isaac Smith Kalloch, mayor of San Francisco
- Charles E. Littlefield, US congressman
- Theodore E. Long, former president of Elizabethtown College
- Herbert Lord, director of the United States Bureau of the Budget
- Samizu Matsuki, artist and educator
- Edward Mazurek, state senator
- Edna St. Vincent Millay, Pulitzer Prize–winning poet
- Edward C. Moran Jr., US Representative
- Louise Nevelson, artist, emigrated from Russia to Rockland as a child
- Edward Lawry Norton, electrical engineer, developed the Norton equivalent circuit
- Walter Piston, Pulitzer Prize–winning composer
- Robert B. Rheault, former commander of all Special Forces in Vietnam
- Malcolm Robbins, Serial killer born in Rockland
- Alice Marion Shaw, composer and pianist born in Rockland
- Carrie Burpee Shaw, composer and educator born in Rockland
- Katrina Smith, state legislator
- Charles Wilbert Snow, poet, college professor, Governor of Connecticut
- James Breckenridge Speed, businessman and philanthropist
- Davis Tillson, Civil War general, state legislator and businessman
- A.C. McLoon, businessman and former mayor of Rockland
