= List of Maine railroads =

The following railroads operate in the U.S. state of Maine.

== Common freight carriers ==
- Canadian Pacific Kansas City
- Cumberland and Knox Railroad
- Eastern Maine Railway (EMRY) (Owned by New Brunswick Southern Railway)
  - Operates Woodland Rail, LLC
- Maine Northern Railway (MNRY) (Owned by New Brunswick Southern Railway)
- Pan Am Railways (PAR)
- St. Lawrence and Atlantic Railroad (SLR) (Genesee and Wyoming)
- Turners Island, LLC (TI)

== Passenger carriers ==
- Amtrak (AMTK)
- Belfast & Moosehead Lake Railway (BML)
- Downeast Scenic Railroad (DSRX)
- Seashore Trolley Museum

=== Two foot gauge railways ===
- Boothbay Railway Village (2 ft (610 mm) narrow gauge)
- Maine Narrow Gauge Railroad Co. & Museum (2 ft (610 mm) narrow gauge)
- Sandy River and Rangeley Lakes Railroad (2 ft (610 mm) narrow gauge)
- Wiscasset, Waterville and Farmington Railway (2 ft (610 mm) narrow gauge)

== Defunct railroads ==
| Name | Mark | System (Note: This is one or more of the Class I railroads that the railroad became part of, if any.) | From | To | Successor | Notes |
|---|---|---|---|---|---|---|
| Androscoggin Railroad | | MEC | 1848 | 1911 | Maine Central Railroad | |
| Androscoggin and Kennebec Railroad | | MEC | 1845 | 1862 | Maine Central Railroad | |
| Aroostook Northern Railroad | | BAR | 1897 | 1901 | Bangor and Aroostook Railroad | |
| Aroostook River Railroad | | CP | 1873 | 1989 | N/A | |
| Aroostook Valley Railroad | AVL | | 1902 | 1996 | N/A | Electric until 1946 |
| Atlantic and North-West Railway | | CP | 1886 | 1994 | Canadian American Railroad | |
| Atlantic and St. Lawrence Railroad | | CN | 1845 | 1960 | Canadian National Railway | |
| Bangor and Aroostook Railroad | BAR | BAR | 1891 | 2003 | Montreal, Maine and Atlantic Railway | |
| Bangor and Katahdin Iron Works Railway | | BAR | 1881 | 1901 | Bangor and Aroostook Railroad | |
| Bangor, Oldtown and Milford Railroad | | MEC | 1855 | 1870 | European and North American Railway | |
| Bangor and Orono Railroad | | MEC | 1847 | 1850 | Penobscot Railroad | |
| Bangor and Piscataquis Railroad | | BAR | 1861 | 1899 | Bangor and Aroostook Railroad | |
| Bangor and Piscataquis Canal and Railroad Company | | MEC | 1833 | 1855 | Bangor, Oldtown and Milford Railroad | |
| Belfast and Moosehead Lake Railroad | BML | MEC | 1868 | 2001 | N/A | Continues as a tourist railroad |
| Belfast & Moosehead Lake Railway | | MEC | 1867 | 1868 | Belfast and Moosehead Lake Railroad | |
| Boston and Maine Corporation | BM | B&M | 1963 | | | Still exists as a lessor of Pan Am Railways operating subsidiary Springfield Terminal Railway |
| Boston and Maine Railroad | B&M, BM | B&M | 1844 | 1964 | Boston and Maine Corporation | |
| Bridgton and Harrison Railway | | | 1927 | 1941 | N/A | |
| Bridgton and Saco River Railroad | | MEC | 1881 | 1930 | Bridgton and Harrison Railway | |
| Buckfield Branch Railroad | | MEC | 1847 | 1863 | Portland and Oxford Central Railroad | |
| Bucksport and Bangor Railroad | | MEC | 1873 | 1882 | Eastern Maine Railway | |
| Calais Railroad | | MEC | 1838 | 1849 | Calais and Baring Railroad | |
| Calais Railway | | MEC | 1832 | 1838 | Calais Railroad | |
| Calais and Baring Railroad | | MEC | 1849 | 1870 | St. Croix and Penobscot Railroad | |
| Canadian American Railroad | CDAC | | 1994 | 2003 | Montreal, Maine and Atlantic Railway | |
| Canadian Atlantic Railway | | CP | 1988 | 1994 | Canadian American Railroad, Eastern Maine Railway | |
| Canadian National Railway | CN | CN | 1923 | 1989 | St. Lawrence and Atlantic Railroad | |
| Canadian Pacific Railway | CP | CP | 1886 | 1988 | Canadian Atlantic Railway | |
| Central Maine and Quebec Railway | CMQ | | 2014 | 2020 | Canadian Pacific Railway | |
| Consolidated European and North American Railway | | MEC | 1872 | 1880 | European and North American Railway | |
| Dexter and Newport Railroad | | MEC | 1853 | 1939 | Maine Central Railroad | |
| Dexter and Piscataquis Railroad | | MEC | 1888 | 1939 | Maine Central Railroad | |
| Eastern Railroad | | B&M | 1847 | 1890 | Boston and Maine Railroad | |
| Eastern Maine Railway | | MEC | 1882 | 1936 | Maine Central Railroad | |
| European and North American Railway | | MEC | 1880 | 1955 | Maine Central Railroad | |
| European and North American Railway | | MEC | 1850 | 1872 | Consolidated European and North American Railway | |
| Eustis Railroad | | MEC | 1903 | 1911 | Sandy River and Rangeley Lakes Railroad | |
| Fish River Railroad | | BAR | 1901 | 1903 | Bangor and Aroostook Railroad | |
| Franklin and Megantic Railroad | | MEC | 1884 | 1897 | Franklin and Megantic Railway | |
| Franklin and Megantic Railway | | MEC | 1897 | 1908 | Sandy River and Rangeley Lakes Railroad | |
| Franklin, Somerset and Kennebec Railway | | | 1897 | 1901 | Wiscasset, Waterville and Farmington Railroad | |
| Georges Valley Railroad | | | 1889 | 1919 | Knox Railroad | |
| Grand Trunk Railway | GT | CN | 1853 | 1923 | Canadian National Railway | |
| Great Falls and South Berwick Branch Railroad | | B&M | 1841 | 1865 | Portsmouth, Great Falls and Conway Railroad | |
| Houlton Branch Railroad | | CP | 1867 | 1989 | N/A | |
| International Railway of Maine | | CP | 1881 | 1886 | Atlantic and North-West Railway | |
| Kennebec Central Railroad | | | 1889 | 1929 | N/A | |
| Kennebec and Portland Railroad | | MEC | 1836 | 1864 | Portland and Kennebec Railroad | |
| Kennebec Valley Railroad | | MEC | 1903 | 1904 | Somerset Railway | |
| Kennebec and Wiscasset Railroad | | | 1854 | 1873 | Wiscasset and Moosehead Lake Railroad | |
| Kennebunk and Kennebunkport Railroad | | B&M | 1882 | 1919 | Boston and Maine Railroad | |
| Kingfield and Dead River Railroad | | MEC | 1893 | 1897 | Kingfield and Dead River Railway | |
| Kingfield and Dead River Railway | | MEC | 1897 | 1908 | Sandy River and Rangeley Lakes Railroad | |
| Knox Railroad | | | 1919 | 1932 | N/A | |
| Knox and Lincoln Railroad | | MEC | 1864 | 1890 | Penobscot Shore Line Railroad | |
| Knox and Lincoln Railway | | MEC | 1891 | 1901 | Maine Central Railroad | |
| Leeds and Farmington Railroad | | MEC | 1865 | 1874 | Maine Central Railroad | |
| Lewiston and Auburn Railroad | | CN | 1872 | | | |
| Lewy's Island Railroad | | MEC | 1854 | 1870 | St. Croix and Penobscot Railroad | |
| Lime Rock Railroad | | | 1864 | 1942 | N/A | |
| Machiasport Railroad | | | 1845 | 1872 | Whitneyville and Machiasport Railroad | |
| Madrid Railroad | | MEC | 1902 | 1908 | Sandy River and Rangeley Lakes Railroad | |
| Maine Central Railroad | MEC | MEC | 1862 | | | Still exists as a lessor of Pan Am Railways operating subsidiary Springfield Terminal Railway |
| Maine Coast Railroad | MC | | 1990 | 2000 | | |
| Maine Eastern Railroad | MERR | | 2003 | 2015 | | |
| Maine, New Hampshire and Massachusetts Railroad | | B&M | 1836 | 1844 | Boston and Maine Railroad | |
| Maine Shore Line Railroad | | MEC | 1881 | 1888 | Maine Central Railroad | |
| Midcoast Railservice | | | 2022 | 2024 | | |
| Monson Railroad | | | 1885 | 1943 | N/A | |
| Monson and Athens Railroad | | | 1881 | 1885 | Monson Railroad | |
| Montreal, Maine and Atlantic Railway | MMA | MMA | 2002 | 2004 | Central Maine and Quebec Railway | Went bankrupt following the Lac-Mégantic derailment |
| New Brunswick Railway | | CP | 1878 | 1890 | Canadian Pacific Railway | |
| New Brunswick and Canada Railway | | CP | 1870 | 1882 | New Brunswick Railway | |
| Northern Maine Seaport Railroad | | BAR | 1904 | 1919 | Bangor and Aroostook Railroad | |
| Norway Branch Railroad | | CN | 1879 | | | |
| Oldtown and Lincoln Railroad | | MEC | 1852 | 1864 | European and North American Railway | |
| Orchard Beach Railroad | | B&M | 1876 | 1893 | Boston and Maine Railroad | |
| Palmer and Machiasport Railroad | | | 1842 | 1845 | Machiasport Railroad | |
| Patten and Sherman Railroad | | BAR | 1895 | 1901 | Bangor and Aroostook Railroad | |
| Penobscot Railroad | | MEC | 1853 | 1863 | European and North American Railway | |
| Penobscot and Kennebec Railroad | | MEC | 1845 | 1862 | Maine Central Railroad | |
| Penobscot and Lake Megantic Railroad | | CP | 1871 | 1881 | International Railway of Maine | |
| Penobscot, Lincoln and Kennebec Railroad | | MEC | 1849 | 1864 | Knox and Lincoln Railroad | |
| Penobscot Shore Line Railroad | | MEC | 1889 | 1891 | Knox and Lincoln Railway | |
| Penobscot and Union River Railroad | | MEC | 1870 | 1873 | Bucksport and Bangor Railroad | |
| Phillips and Rangeley Railroad | | MEC | 1889 | 1908 | Sandy River and Rangeley Lakes Railroad | |
| Portland and Kennebec Railroad | | MEC | 1862 | 1874 | Maine Central Railroad | |
| Portland and Ogdensburg Railroad | | MEC | 1867 | 1887 | Portland and Ogdensburg Railway | |
| Portland and Ogdensburg Railway | | MEC | 1886 | 1943 | Maine Central Railroad | |
| Portland and Oxford Central Railroad | | MEC | 1857 | 1896 | Portland and Rumford Falls Railway | |
| Portland and Rochester Railroad | | B&M | 1864 | 1900 | Boston and Maine Railroad | |
| Portland and Rumford Falls Railroad | | MEC | 1907 | 1946 | Maine Central Railroad | |
| Portland and Rumford Falls Railway | | MEC | 1890 | 1946 | Maine Central Railroad | |
| Portland and Yarmouth Electric Railway | | | 1898 | 1933 | | |
| Portland, Saco and Portsmouth Railroad | | B&M | 1837 | 1900 | Boston and Maine Railroad | |
| Portland Terminal Company | PTM | MEC | 1911 | | | Still exists as a lessor of Pan Am Railways operating subsidiary Springfield Terminal Railway |
| Portland Union Railway Station Company | | MEC | 1887 | 1911 | Portland Terminal Company | |
| Portsmouth, Great Falls and Conway Railroad | | B&M | 1865 | 1890 | Boston and Maine Railroad | |
| Rangeley Lakes and Megantic Railroad | | MEC | 1909 | 1914 | Maine Central Railroad | |
| Rockport Railroad | | | 1886 | 1896 | N/A | |
| Rumford Falls and Buckfield Railroad | | MEC | 1874 | 1896 | Portland and Rumford Falls Railway | |
| Rumford Falls and Rangeley Lakes Railroad | | MEC | 1894 | 1936 | N/A | |
| Safe Handling Rail, Inc. | | | 2000 | 2003 | | |
| St. Croix and Penobscot Railroad | | MEC | 1870 | 1899 | Washington County Railroad | |
| Sandy River Railroad | | MEC | 1879 | 1908 | Sandy River and Rangeley Lakes Railroad | |
| Sandy River and Rangeley Lakes Railroad | | MEC | 1908 | 1935 | N/A | |
| Sanford and Eastern Railroad | | | 1949 | 1961 | N/A | |
| Schoodic Stream Railroad | | BAR | 1906 | 1907 | Bangor and Aroostook Railroad | |
| Sebasticook and Moosehead Railroad | | MEC | 1886 | 1910 | Maine Central Railroad | |
| Somerset Railroad | | MEC | 1860 | 1883 | Somerset Railway | |
| Somerset Railway | | MEC | 1904 | 1911 | Maine Central Railroad | |
| Somerset Railway | | MEC | 1883 | 1904 | Kennebec Valley Railroad | |
| Somerset and Kennebec Railroad | | MEC | 1848 | 1874 | Maine Central Railroad | |
| Van Buren Bridge Company | VB | BAR | 1913 | 2003 | Montreal, Maine and Atlantic Railway | |
| Washington County Railroad | | MEC | 1893 | 1903 | Washington County Railway | |
| Washington County Railway | | MEC | 1903 | 1911 | Maine Central Railroad | |
| Waterville and Wiscasset Railroad | | | 1895 | 1901 | Wiscasset, Waterville and Farmington Railroad | |
| Whitneyville and Machiasport Railroad | | | 1872 | 1892 | N/A | |
| Wiscasset and Moosehead Lake Railroad | | | 1873 | 1876 | Wiscasset and Quebec Railroad | |
| Wiscasset and Quebec Railroad | | | 1876 | 1901 | Wiscasset, Waterville and Farmington Railroad | |
| Wiscasset, Waterville and Farmington Railroad | | | 1901 | 1906 | Wiscasset, Waterville and Farmington Railway | |
| Wiscasset, Waterville and Farmington Railway | | | 1907 | 1933 | N/A | |
| York and Cumberland Railroad | | B&M | 1846 | 1865 | Portland and Rochester Railroad | |
| York Harbor and Beach Railroad | | B&M | 1883 | 1927 | N/A | |

Private carriers

- Bald Mountain Railroad
- Eagle Lake and West Branch Railroad
- Ray Lumber Company
- Schmick Handle & Lumber Company
- Seboomook Lake and Saint John Railroad
- South Bog Railway
- Wild River Railroad

Passenger carriers

- Acadian Railway
- Green Mountain Cog Railway

Electric

- Androscoggin Electric Company
- Aroostook Valley Railroad (AVL)
- Atlantic Shore Railway
- Atlantic Shore Line Railway
- Auburn, Mechanic Falls and Norway Street Railway
- Auburn and Turner Railroad
- Augusta, Hallowell and Gardiner Railroad
- Augusta and Waterville Railway
- Augusta, Winthrop and Gardiner Railway
- Bangor Railway and Electric Company
- Bangor, Hampden and Winterport Railway
- Bangor and Northern Railroad
- Bangor, Orono and Old Town Railway
- Bangor Street Railway
- Bath Street Railway
- Benton and Fairfield Railway
- Biddeford and Saco Railroad
- Brunswick Electric Railroad
- Brunswick and Yarmouth Street Railway
- Calais Street Railway
- Camden and Rockport Street Railroad
- Cumberland County Power and Light Company
- Eliot Bridge Company
- Fairfield and Shawmut Railway
- Hampden and Winterport Railway
- Hampden and Winterport Electric Railway and Light Company
- Kittery and Eliot Street Railway
- Lewiston and Auburn Horse Railroad
- Lewiston, Augusta and Waterville Street Railway
- Lewiston, Brunswick and Bath Street Railway
- Lewiston, Winthrop and Augusta Street Railway
- Mousam River Railroad
- Norway and Paris Street Railway
- Old Town Electric Company
- Old Town, Orono and Veazie Railway
- Old Town Street Railway
- Portland Railroad
- Portland and Brunswick Street Railway
- Portland and Yarmouth Electric Railway
- Portland, Gray and Lewiston Railroad
- Portland–Lewiston Interurban
- Portsmouth, Dover and York Street Railway
- Portsmouth, Kittery and York Street Railway
- Public Works Company
- Rockland, South Thomaston and Owls Head Railway
- Rockland, South Thomaston and St. George Street Railway
- Rockland Street Railway
- Rockland, Thomaston and Camden Street Railway
- Sanford and Cape Porpoise Railway
- Skowhegan and Norridgewock Railway and Power Company
- Somerset Traction Company
- Thomaston Street Railway
- Waterville and Fairfield Railroad
- Waterville and Fairfield Railway and Light Company
- Waterville, Fairfield and Oakland Railway
- Waterville and Oakland Street Railway

Not completed

- Portland and Rutland Railroad
- Portland, Rutland, Oswego and Chicago Railroad

== Bibliography ==
- Association of American Railroads (2003), Railroad Service in Maine (PDF). Retrieved May 11, 2005.
- Hilton, George W. (1990). American Narrow Gauge Railroads. Stanford, California: Stanford University Press. ISBN 0-8047-2369-9.
