= 1846 in rail transport =

This article lists events related to rail transport that occurred in 1846.

== Events ==
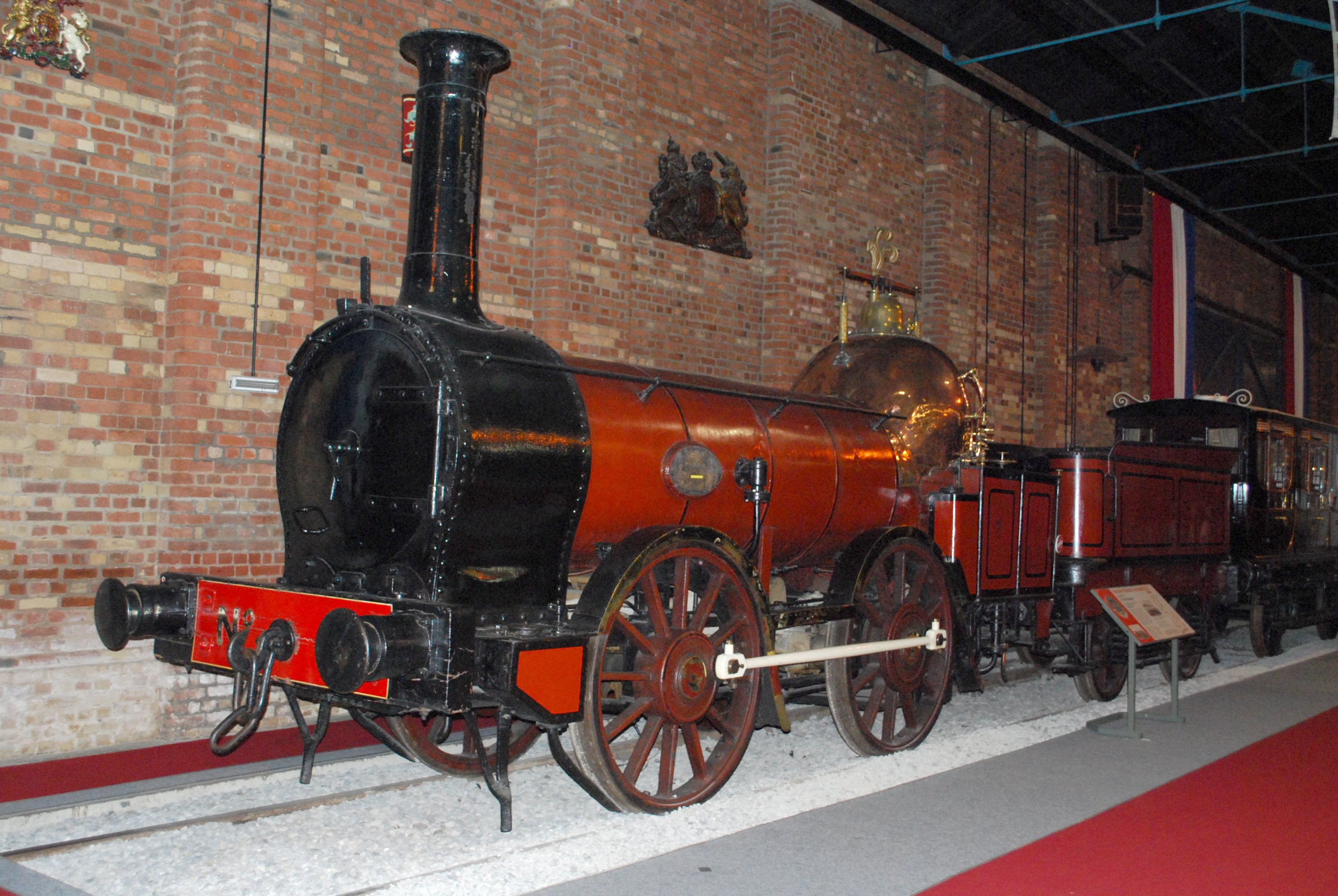
Furness Railway No. 3, entered service February 1846 in the north of England

=== January events ===
- January 9 – Barentin Viaduct on the Paris–Le Havre railway collapses soon after its completion by English engineers.
- January 13 – Opening of the Milan–Venice railway's 3.2 km (2.0 mi) bridge over the Venetian Lagoon between Mestre and Venice in Italy.

=== March events ===
- March 26 – John M. Forbes becomes president of the Michigan Central Railroad.

=== June events ===
- June 14 – The first Gare du Nord station in Paris, France, is opened.
- June 20 – The Paris–Lille railway is opened in France.
- June 22 – The North British Railway is opened to public traffic between Edinburgh and Berwick-upon-Tweed, the first line to cross the border between Scotland and England. Waverley Station is opened.
- June 26 – The Great Northern Railway (Great Britain) is authorised by Act of Parliament with powers to construct a direct line from London to York with a loop via Boston, 233.5 mi (375.8 km) with a capital of £5,600,000, the largest single scheme ever approved by Parliament.

=== July events ===
- July 1 – The Leeds and Bradford Railway opens between Leeds and Bradford, West Yorkshire, England.
- July 15 – The first railway line in Hungary opens between Pest and Vác.
- July 16 – The London and North Western Railway is formed in England by amalgamation of the London and Birmingham Railway, Grand Junction Railway and Manchester and Birmingham Railway.

=== August events ===
- August 11 – First section of Furness Railway in England opens to mineral traffic; passengers are first carried on December 1.
- August 18 – Gauge Act passed by the Parliament of the United Kingdom rules that new railways in Great Britain should be built to standard gauge and 5 ft 3 inches in Ireland unless otherwise authorised.
- August 28 – Railway Mania reaches its zenith as the Parliament of the United Kingdom closes its session having passed 272 Acts setting up new railway companies.

=== September events ===
- September 21 – The town of Kendal, England, declares a public holiday for the opening of the Kendal, Oxenholme and Lancaster section of the Lancaster and Carlisle Railway; the first revenue trains are operated on September 22.
- September 28 – The East Lancashire Railway opens to the public from Clifton Junction to Rawtenstall in England.

=== November events ===
- November 10 – Portland Company established by John A. Poor and Septimus Norris of the Norris Locomotive Works.

=== December events ===
- December 17 – The Lancaster and Carlisle Railway is opened throughout to Carlisle.

== Births ==
=== April births ===
- April 13 – Lucius E. Johnson, president of the Norfolk and Western Railroad 1904–1921 (d. 1921).

=== October births ===
- October 6 – George Westinghouse, American inventor; developed the Westinghouse air brake (d. 1914).
