= John A. Poor =

John Alfred Poor
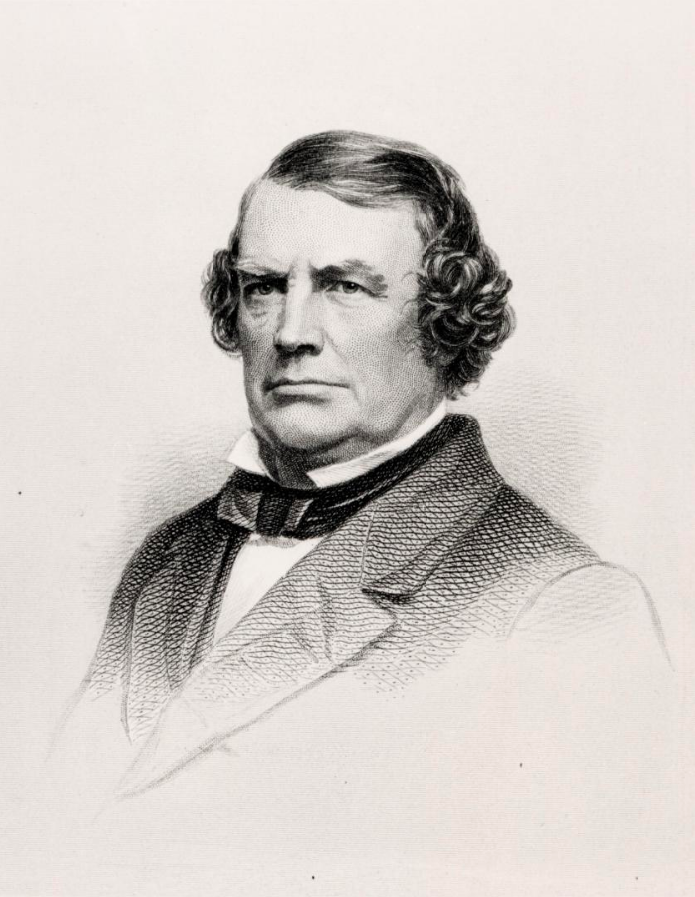
- Engraving circa 1860
- Born: January 8, 1808; East Andover, Massachusetts, U.S.
- Died: September 6, 1871 (aged 63); Portland, Maine, U.S.
- Occupations: Lawyer, editor, and entrepreneur
- Known for: Portland Company; Grand Trunk Railway; York and Cumberland Railroad; European and North American Railway

John Alfred Poor (January 8, 1808 – September 6, 1871) was an American lawyer, editor, and entrepreneur best remembered for his association with the Grand Trunk Railway and his role in developing the railroad system in Maine. He was the older brother of Henry Varnum Poor of Standard & Poor's, who was his partner in some business ventures. John Poor was an articulate man standing 6 feet, two inches (1.9 m) tall and weighing over 250 pounds (110 kg). He learned the geography and commerce of northern New England during travels as a young man; and developed an early appreciation for the potential of railroads. His commanding presence was enhanced by early speaking experience as a teacher and attorney. He had a unique ability to assemble the necessary resources to build early railroads, although he left the routine work of operations to others.

== Early life ==
John Poor was born in East Andover, Massachusetts (now Andover, Maine), to Dr. Silvanus Poor and Mary (Merrill) Poor. He became a school teacher at Bethel, Maine, before undertaking the study of law. He was admitted to the Maine Bar in 1834 and established a law practice in Bangor, Maine, with his brother Henry Varnum Poor. John was inspired by his first viewing of a steam locomotive on the Boston and Worcester Railroad in 1834.

== Railroads ==
Poor promoted the concept of a railroad from Montreal to Portland, Maine. Montreal would gain access to an ice-free seaport while the Saint Lawrence River was frozen; and Portland would gain commercial opportunities from the transfer of Canadian exports in its harbor. Portland writer, critic, and investor, John Neal wrote of the necessity "to drive Boston out of the business and secure [a] monopoly." Poor's vision was realized when Portland became the winter seaport of the transcontinental Grand Trunk Railway.

The Montreal Board of Trade weighed the benefits of rail connection to Portland or Boston. Portland was 100 miles closer to Montreal and Portland was a half day closer to European ports; but Portland's population of 16,000 could hardly offer the financial support for railroad construction promised by Boston businessmen. As Boston representatives presented their case, John Poor made a 300-mile (500-km) trip through the White Mountains during a February blizzard. Poor left Portland shortly after midnight February 5, 1845, but the wind driven snow made it very difficult to follow the road. His sleigh covered 7.5 miles (12.5 km) to Falmouth, Maine, in three hours. After breakfast at Leach's Tavern, he traveled 40 miles (65 km), and had frostbite on his nose and one ear by the time he reached South Paris, Maine, at nightfall. He traveled to his home town of Andover on February 6, after obtaining help from residents of Rumford, Maine to break a path through snowdrifts higher than a horse's back. He then traveled another 40 miles (65 km) to reach Colebrook, New Hampshire, at midnight. Colebrook residents helped Poor carry his sleigh and lead the horses through Dixville Notch where howling winds formed a 20-foot snowdrift. Poor rested in Sherbrooke, Quebec before venturing forth through unbroken snow 18 inches (46 cm) deep in temperatures of -18 °F (-27 °C) and crossed the ice-covered Saint Lawrence river at dawn on February 9. After resting 3 hours in his Montreal hotel room, Poor addressed the Montreal Board of Trade as they considered a resolution in support of the railway to Boston. Poor convinced the Canadians to delay support of the railway to Boston, and subsequent debate resulted in approval of the St. Lawrence and Atlantic Railroad to Portland. Poor had frostbitten feet and developed pneumonia upon his return to Portland that spring.

In 1846, Poor turned his attention to building locomotives for Portland's railway. After discussions with Norris Locomotive Works Poor organized, and became first president of, the Portland Company on August 8, 1846. Portland Company's locomotive erecting shops opened for business in October 1847.

In 1849, John Poor purchased the American Railroad Journal, and his brother Henry Varnum Poor became manager and editor. Standard & Poor's traces its history back to this publication.

John Poor began promoting a railway from Portland to Halifax, Nova Scotia, in 1850. He became a director of the European and North American Railway in 1867. The railway was completed a month after his death in 1871. He was president of the York and Cumberland Railroad in 1851, and president of the Penobscot and Kennebec Railroad in 1852. He died at his home in Portland, Maine, on September 6, 1871. He was president of the Portland, Rutland, Oswego and Chicago Railroad at the time. His ambitious vision for Portland's rail connection with Chicago was never realized, but his European and North American Railway became the eastern end of the transcontinental Canadian Pacific Railway.

== Legacy ==
The City of Portland passed the following resolutions in 1871 in respect to the memory of John A. Poor:

"Resolved, that among the many laborious, energetic and far-seeing business men of Portland, to whom we are indebted for the consideration we now enjoy, both at home and abroad, the Honorable John A. Poor, who called away on Tuesday morning last, stood foremost - head and shoulders above the rest.

"As not merely a business man, but as a statesman, large-hearted, sagacious, indefatigable and self sacrificing, it was not for the present, but for the future, that he underwent such labor for nearly thirty years, as resulted in sudden death at the age of sixty-three, when the grandest of all his magnificent undertaking wanted but a few days of completion.

"Resolved, That to his labor, knowledge and foresight, we are indebted for the Atlantic & St. Lawrence Railway, now the Grand Trunk, whereby our valuation has nearly quadrupled since 1842, the season of our greatest depression and discouragement;

"For the opening of Commercial Street now lined on both sides with large business houses and resulting in the Marginal Way, one hundred feet in width, around our whole city, front and back, and over three miles in length, giving us an uninterrupted water front, worth million to us, in connection with our unrivaled harbor;

"For the opening of our Portland Works, where engines and cars of the best workmanship have been built, year after year in large numbers not only for the railroads of Maine, but for other and very distant regions, during the last twenty years;

"For the establishment of our Gas Works, after they had come to a full stop; And for much that has been done first and last for the flourishing Rochester Road, now on its way to New York;

"For the original movement, which resulted in the hydrographic survey of our state by that able and conscientious engineer, Walter Wells, whereby our whole country has been brought acquainted with the astonishing accumulation of water power within our territory for manufacturing purposes.

"Resolved, That to John A. Poor we are indebted for the project of out European and North American Railway, now nearly completed - as part of the Trans-continental and Inter-oceanic railway through Portland, Rutland, Oswego, and Chicago - which, had he lived, would soon be in successful operation, a great highway for the nations, opening the West, by a direct line, the nearest, safest and cheapest transportation, for five hundred million bushels of wheat which Baring Brothers have already provided a market for, and for whatever else the overflowing West may desire to be rid of; enriching the farmers and connecting the Old World with the New, China, Japan, and the East with all Europe, through our territory, leaving us to take toll both ways, and bringing the commercial world acquainted with our magnificent harbor, and our unequaled facilities for a large business; all the other enterprises mentioned, though successful, being but preliminary and subordinate to this, now so near its consummation.

"Resolved, That while we desire to bear sad testimony to the world of the departed, we cannot withhold our sympathy from his wife and child, thought we are aware that, for a season, their loss will be but aggravated by such evidence, because we believe that after a time it may be among the greatest of their earthly consolations."

The Liberty ship SS John A. Poor was named for him.
