= Portland and Rochester Railroad main line =

Former railway line in the United States

Overview
- Locale: Maine and New Hampshire
- Termini: Portland, Maine; Rochester, New Hampshire

History
- Opened: 1853
- Closed: 1961

Technical
- Line length: 52.5 mi (84.5 km)
- Track gauge: 1,435 mm (4 ft 8 1/2 in) standard gauge

The main line of the Portland and Rochester Railroad was a railway line in the states of Maine and New Hampshire. It was constructed between 1850 and 1871 by the Portland and Rochester Railroad and its predecessor, the York and Cumberland Railroad. It ran 52.5 miles (84.5 km) from Portland, Maine, to Rochester, New Hampshire. The line became part of the Boston and Maine Railroad in 1900 and formed the company's Worcester, Nashua and Portland Division along with the line of the Worcester, Nashua and Rochester Railroad. The line was gradually abandoned between 1911 and 1961.

== History ==
The York and Cumberland Railroad, incorporated in 1846, constructed its initial line between Portland, Maine, and Bar Mills, Maine, on the Saco River, between 1850 and 1853. Its Portland depot was located on Preble Street, facing toward Back Cove. The company was reorganized as the Portland and Rochester Railroad in 1865, and extended the line southwest to Rochester, New Hampshire, in 1871. The Worcester and Nashua Railroad, through the Nashua and Rochester Railroad, reached Rochester from the south in 1874. On the Portland end, connections were built to the east with the Grand Trunk Railway (1874) and Union Station (1891).

The Boston and Maine Railroad (B&M) took stock control of the Portland and Rochester Railroad in 1890 and merged the company in 1900. The B&M abandoned the eastern end of the line between the Maine Central Railroad main line at Deering Junction and the Preble Street station in 1911. Passenger service ended on June 25, 1932. The B&M sold the line to the Sanford and Eastern Railroad in 1949. The Sanford and Eastern abandoned the section between Rochester and Springvale, Maine, in 1952. It abandoned the remainder of the line in 1961.
