= Sanford and Eastern Railroad =

Overview
- Parent company: Pinsly Railroad Company
- Locale: Maine and New Hampshire
- Dates of operation: 1949–1961

Technical
- Track gauge: 1,435 mm (4 ft 8 1/2 in)
- Track length: 48 miles (77 km)

The Sanford and Eastern Railroad was a railway company in the United States. It was established by the Pinsly Railroad Company in 1949 to operate the Portland and Rochester Railroad main line. The company's holdings also included a short branch line acquired from the Atlantic Shore Line Railway. The company ceased operations in 1961.

== History ==
The Portland and Rochester Railroad main line ran between Portland, Maine, and Rochester, New Hampshire, and had belonged to the Boston and Maine Railroad (B&M) since 1900. The Pinsly Railroad Company acquired the line between Westbrook, Maine, and Rochester in 1949 and created the Sanford and Eastern Railroad to own and operate the line. The Sanford and Eastern also acquired a 2.2-mile (3.5 km) branch between Springvale, Maine, and Sanford, Maine, from the Atlantic Shore Line Railway. The Sanford and Eastern ended electric operation over this branch line. In 1951, the Sanford and Eastern owned two diesel locomotives: a GE 70-ton switcher and a GE 44-ton switcher.

The company abandoned the line between Rochester and Springvale in 1952. The principal customer on the remainder of the line was the Goodall mills in Sanford. With the closure of the mills the company struggled and ceased operations in 1961. Both lines were abandoned.
