= Worcester, Nashua and Rochester Railroad =

American railroad

Map

The Worcester, Nashua and Rochester Railroad was a railroad line that was to link the city of Worcester, Massachusetts, to the city of Portland, Maine, via the New Hampshire cities of Nashua and Rochester, by merging several small shortline railroads (typical of the earliest North American railways) together.

== History ==
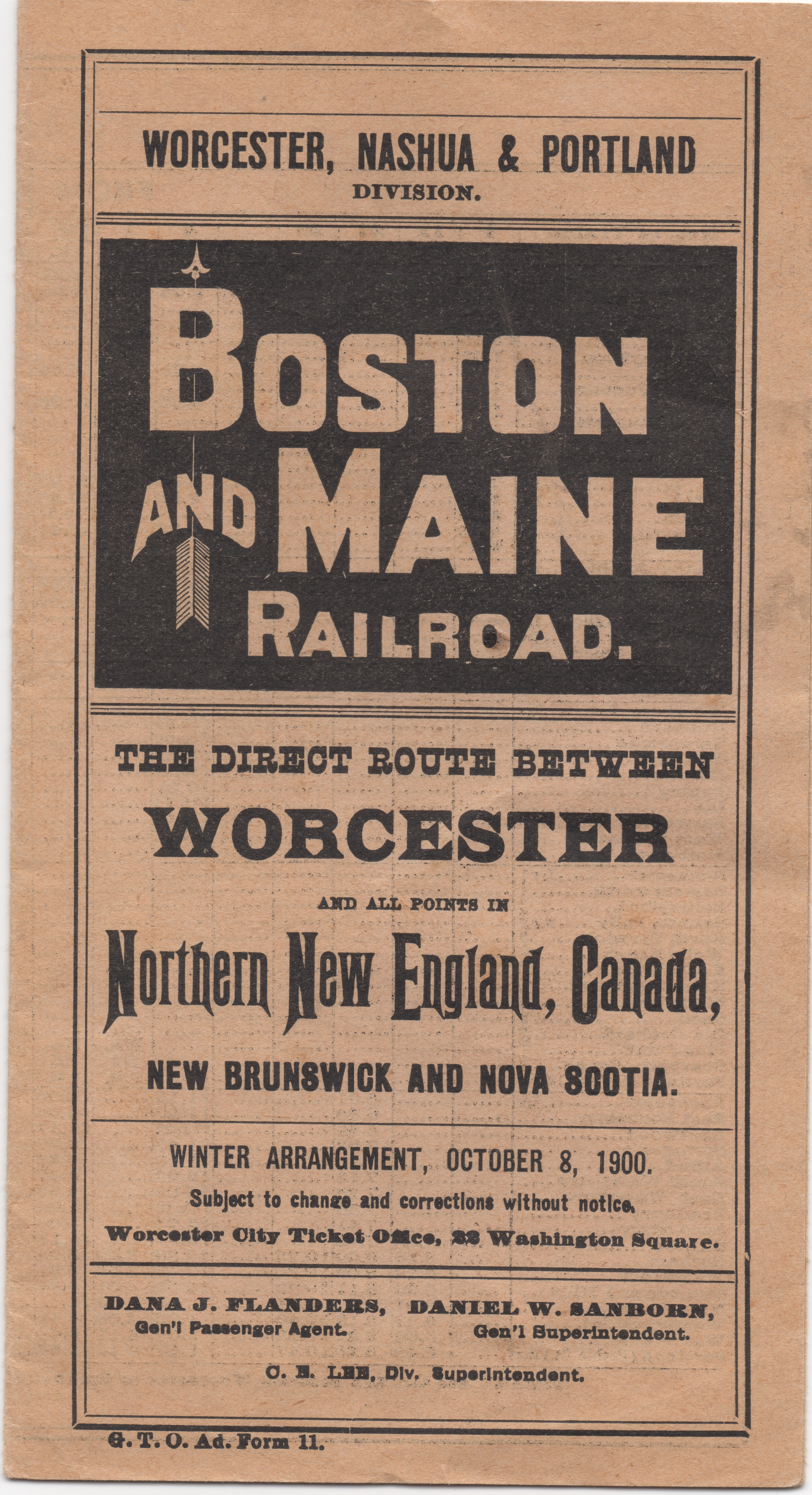
Boston & Maine Railroad timetable for the Worcester, Nashua & Portland Division, October, 1900

In 1845, Worcester was becoming an important railroad junction in central Massachusetts, with numerous rail lines linking the city to Boston, Springfield, Providence, Rhode Island, and Norwich, Connecticut, with another line linking it to Albany, New York. But there was not a rail link with the cities in northern New England.

The Worcester and Nashua Railroad was organized in 1845 to link Worcester to the growing mill city of Nashua. The line opened as far as Groton Junction (now Ayer) in July 1848 and to Nashua in December. The line opened up New Hampshire to southern and western New England and plans were made to connect the line with southern Maine.

The Nashua and Rochester Railroad was formed in 1847, extending a railway line to Rochester, New Hampshire, on the Maine border. The Worcester and Nashua (W&N) leased the Nashua and Rochester (N&R) in 1874, and the two companies merged into the Worcester, Nashua and Rochester Railroad in 1883. The Boston and Maine Railroad leased the line in 1886. This acquisition also included the continuation from Rochester to Portland, via the York and Cumberland Railroad which was formed in 1846. It opened to Gorham, Maine, in 1851 under the direction of Maine railroad pioneer John A. Poor and was extended in 1853. The York and Cumberland was reorganized as the Portland and Rochester Railroad in 1867, with a connection to the Grand Trunk Railway in Portland, and was completed to Rochester in 1871. The three lines were tied together by the B&M as its Worcester, Nashua and Portland Division and covered over 147 miles (237 km).

By 1901, the B&M found they had three parallel lines between Massachusetts and Maine, due to the various mergers and leasings. There was enough business for all three lines during the first decade and a half of the new century, but by 1915, passenger service was rerouted down the Stony Brook line, and freight service had dropped off as well. By 1930, the construction of a new wye in North Chelmsford rerouted all freight up the Stony Brook and the Nashua and Lowell Railroad to reach New Hampshire.

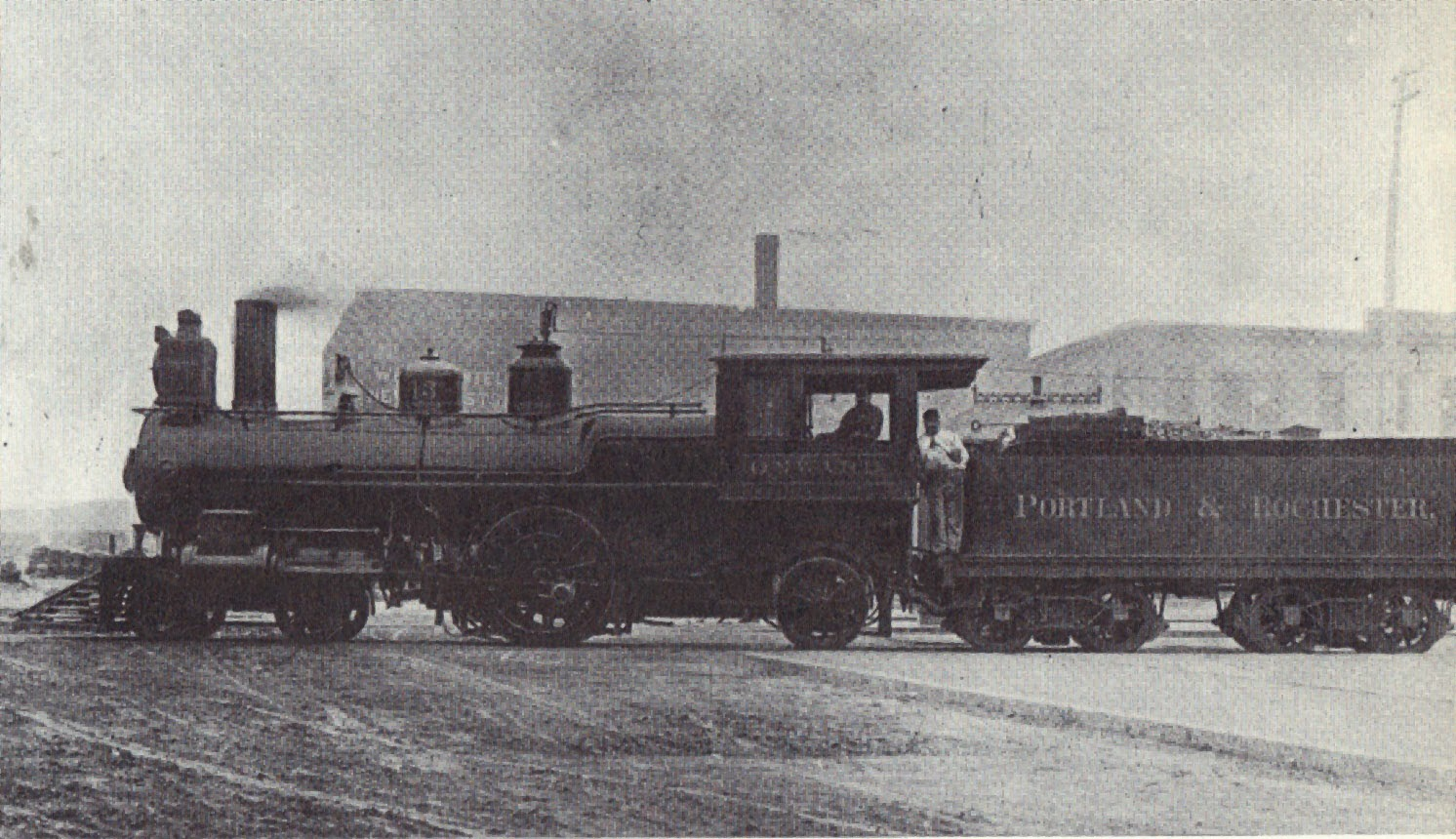
A locomotive of Portland and Rochester Railroad

The B&M began the process of abandoning portions of the WN&P division in 1932 when two large sections were discontinued from Hudson to Fremont, New Hampshire, and from Epping to Gonic, New Hampshire. Service between Gonic and Rochester lasted until 1982.

The next abandonment came in 1942 when the line was cut off from Hollis, New Hampshire, to a point one mile from Union Station in Nashua. Later that year, the line was wiped out from Union Station across the Merrimack River to Hudson.

The portion of the line in Maine between Rochester and Springvale was gone in 1952, but the line from Springvale to Westbrook operated from 1949 to 1961 as the shortline Sanford and Eastern Railroad, which also operated trackage between Springvale and Sanford that was once part of the Atlantic Shore Line interurban system. Today only portions of the line in Westbrook and Portland still see traffic, being serviced by the Portland Terminal Company.

Paper mills along the line between Ayer and Hollis kept the train moving north of Ayer Junction until 1981 when the B&M stopped all service. In 1982, the line north of Ayer Junction was abandoned and the tracks removed two years later. The Commonwealth of Massachusetts acquired this portion of the right of way; in 2002 it was officially opened as the Nashua River Rail Trail. The one mile of track between Union Station in Nashua and an industrial park was abandoned finally in 1993.

The W&N still survives between Ayer and Worcester, operated by CSX whereby it is now designated as that railroad's New England Division, Worcester Sub-Division. The line sees daily through-freight usage. In 2011, the MBTA acquired trackage rights on the line to allow for future passenger service. After acquiring Pan Am in 2022, CSX rebuilt the line to allow 25 miles per hour (40 km/h) between Worcester and Clinton, and 40 miles per hour (64 km/h) between Clinton and Harvard. Norfolk Southern started running intermodal trains over the line between Worcester and Ayer as part of trackage rights obtained during CSX's acquisition of Pan Am Railways.

== Stations ==
Milepost	State	Town / City	Station	Location	Notes
0.00	MA	Worcester	Worcester Union Station		
0.76	MA	Worcester	Lincoln Square		
2.92	MA	Worcester	Barber		Connection with Worcester and Hillsboro Branch
3.52	MA	Worcester	Greendale		
4.21	MA	Worcester	Bradley		
4.61	MA	Worcester	Summit		
8.76	MA	West Boylston	West Boylston		
10.16	MA	West Boylston	Oakdale		Connection with Central Massachusetts Railroad
11.90	MA	Sterling	Sterling Junction		Connection with Fitchburg & Worcester Railroad
14.93	MA	Clinton	Clinton Junction		Connection with Central Massachusetts Railroad
16.76	MA	Clinton	Clinton		
18.09	MA	Lancaster	Thayer		
19.19	MA	Lancaster	Lancaster		
23.19	MA	Harvard	Still River		
25.39	MA	Harvard	Harvard		
28.01	MA	Ayer	Ayer		
31.54	MA	Groton	Groton		
36.18	MA	Pepperell	Pepperell		
39.69	NH	Nashua	Hollis		
45.16	NH	Nashua	Nashua Main Street		
45.86	NH	Nashua	Nashua Union Station		
48.28	NH	Hudson	Hudson		
52.05	NH	Windham	Anderson		
56.00	NH	Windham	Windham		
59.97	NH	Derry	Hubbard		
61.85	NH	Hampstead	Hampstead		
64.64	NH	Sandown	Sandown		
69.59	NH	Fremont	Fremont		
74.03	NH	Epping	Epping		
79.21	NH	Lee	Lee		
87.68	NH	Barrington	Barrington		
92.18	NH	Rochester	West Gonic		
94.31	NH	Rochester	Rochester		
96.88	NH	Rochester	Rindgemere		
103.78	ME	Lebanon	Eastwood		
110.58	ME	Sanford	Sanford and Springvale		Connection to Atlantic Shore Line
114.46	ME	Alfred	Alfred		
118.79	ME	Waterboro	Waterboro		
121.86	ME	Waterboro	Wescott		
126.94	ME	Hollis	Bradbury		
129.09	ME	Buxton	Bar Mills		
131.56	ME	Buxton	Buxton		
136.63	ME	Gorham	Gorham		
140.40	ME	Westbrook	Westbrook		
141.31	ME	Westbrook	Cumberland Mills		
144.38	ME	Portland	Deering Junction		
145.45	ME	Portland	Woodfords		
147.00	ME	Portland	Portland Union Station		
