= York and Cumberland Railroad =

York and Cumberland Railroad may refer to:

- York and Cumberland Railroad (Maine), 1846-1865, predecessor of the Boston and Maine Railroad
- York and Cumberland Railroad (Pennsylvania), 1846-1854, predecessor of the Northern Central Railway (Pennsylvania Railroad system)
