= Septimus Norris =

Septimus Norris (1818 – 1862) was an American mechanical engineer and steam locomotive designer. He was the youngest of three brothers all active in the field — his eldest brother William Norris founded the Norris Locomotive Works of Philadelphia, Pennsylvania, and Richard Norris took over the firm in about 1841. The other two brothers were primarily businessmen, while Septimus was an engineer. He worked for the Norris firm under William's management, but did not continue under Richard's; railway historian John H. White, Jr. believes animosity existed between Septimus and Richard. Septimus later worked for the Portland Company and the Schenectady Locomotive Works.

According to "The Original History of the Baldwin Locomotive Works, 1831-1923" by Paul T. Warner, as contained in "The Locomotives That Baldwin Built" by Fred Westing, the US patent for the 4-6-0 "ten wheeler" was issued to Norris in 1846, and Norris built then tested the first one in April 1847.
