= Portland and Rochester Railroad =

Overview
- Locale: Maine and New Hampshire
- Dates of operation: 1865–1900
- Predecessor: York and Cumberland Railroad
- Successor: Boston and Maine Railroad

Technical
- Track gauge: 1,435 mm (4 ft 8 1/2 in)

The Portland and Rochester Railroad was a railway company in the United States. It was established in 1865 to reorganize the York and Cumberland Railroad, whose line ran from Portland, Maine, to Bar Mills, Maine. The Portland and Rochester extended the line southwest to Rochester, New Hampshire. The company was merged into the Boston and Maine Railroad in 1900. The Portland and Rochester Railroad main line became part of the B&M's Worcester, Nashua and Portland Division along with the line of the Worcester, Nashua and Rochester Railroad.

== History ==
The York and Cumberland Railroad was incorporated in 1846 to challenge the Portland, Saco and Portsmouth Railroad. It eventually completed a line between Portland, Maine, and Bar Mills, Maine, on the Saco River. The railroad lacked the ability to push further south to connections with other railroads, and was reorganized on November 1, 1865, as the Portland and Rochester Railroad.

With financial backing from Portland, the Portland and Rochester Railroad began building south, and reached Rochester, New Hampshire, in 1871. A new through route was created when the Worcester and Nashua Railroad, through the Nashua and Rochester Railroad, reached Rochester from the south in 1874. In Portland, the Portland and Rochester built two small branches: a connection along Back Cove to connect with the Grand Trunk Railway, and a short branch to reach Union Station. These opened in 1874 and 1891, respectively.

The Worcester and Nashua and Nashua and Rochester merged to become the Worcester, Nashua and Rochester Railroad in 1883; the Boston and Maine Railroad leased the merged company in 1886. The B&M gained stock control of the Portland and Rochester in the 1880s but it remained independent until 1900. Under B&M control the Portland and Rochester Railroad main line formed the northern end of the company's Worcester, Nashua and Portland Division.
