= Sandown Depot =

- Sandown Depot, Boston and Maine Railroad
- U.S. National Register of Historic Places
- NH State Register of Historic Places
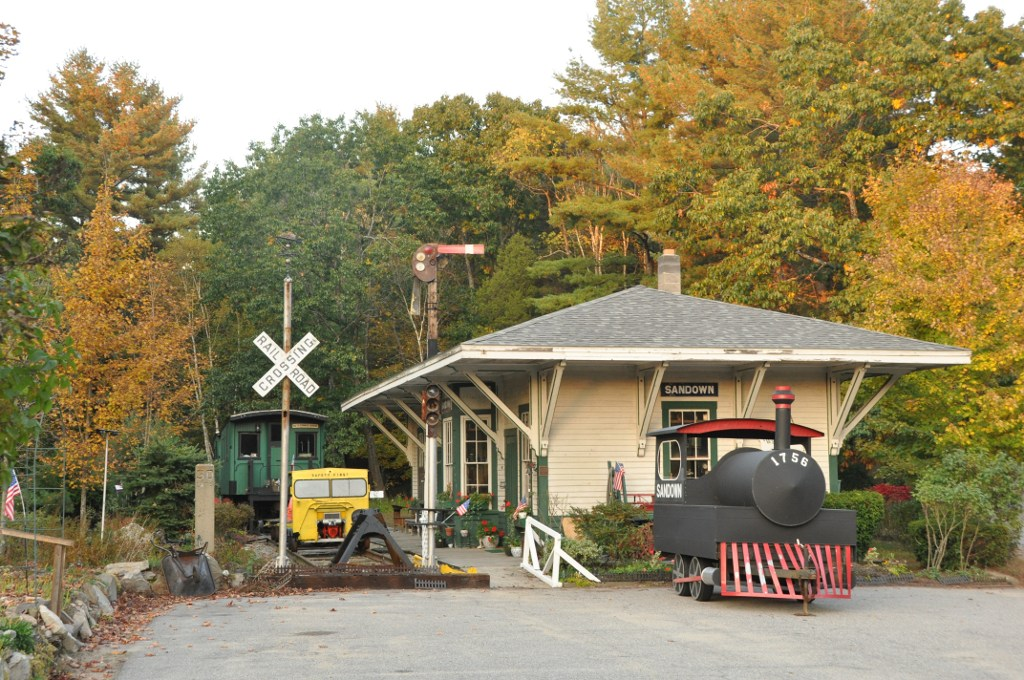

- Location within New Hampshire Location within the United States
- Location: Depot Rd., Sandown, New Hampshire
- Coordinates: 42°55′46″N 71°11′8″W
- Area: less than one acre
- Built: 1873
- NRHP reference No.: 86002167

Significant dates
- Added to NRHP: September 4, 1986
- Designated NHSRHP: April 25, 2011

The Sandown Depot is a former railroad station of the Boston and Maine Railroad in Sandown, New Hampshire. Built in 1873–74, it is the best-preserved of stations built by the Nashua and Rochester Railroad to survive, remaining relatively unaltered since its construction, and still at its original location. It is now a local history museum, and was listed on the National Register of Historic Places in 1986, and the New Hampshire State Register of Historic Places in 2011.

== Description and history ==
The former Sandown Depot is located on the north side of the village center of Sandown, just off Main Street between Depot Road and the former railroad right-of-way now occupied by the Rockingham Recreational Trail. It is a single-story wood-frame structure, measuring about 20 by 50 feet (6.1 m × 15.2 m). Its exterior is finished in wooden clapboards, and it is covered by a broad low-pitch hip roof, whose eaves extend well beyond the structure and are supported by large knee brackets. The track side of the building has a projecting window bay near the center, next to which a semaphore mast rises through the roof. The interior is divided into sections historically used as passenger waiting areas (one each for men and women), freight storage, and the station master's office and telegraph dispatch. Portions of the interior have been modernized.

This station was built in 1873–74 by the Nashua and Rochester Railroad, which was eventually absorbed by the Boston and Maine Railroad. The station was a major location on a heavily traveled single track, with support services including a telegraph office, post office, freight depot, and a large siding area with capacity for 62 cars. It consequently became a major point of civic activity in the rural town. Rail traffic declined in the early 1930s, and the rails were taken up in 1935. The depot building was used by the state highway department as a storage facility between 1934 and 1977, and has since been converted to a local history museum.

== See also ==
- National Register of Historic Places listings in Rockingham County, New Hampshire
