= Henry Varnum Poor =

American financial analyst (1812–1905)

- Born: December 8, 1812; East Andover, Massachusetts, U.S.
- Died: January 4, 1905 (aged 92); Brookline, Massachusetts, U.S.
- Education: Bowdoin College (BA)
- Occupations: Lawyer, financial analyst
- Known for: Founder of Standard & Poor's

Henry Varnum Poor (December 8, 1812 – January 4, 1905) was an American financial analyst and founder of H.V. and H.W. Poor Co, which later evolved into the financial research and analysis bellwether, Standard & Poor's.

== Biography ==
Born in East Andover, Massachusetts (now Andover, Maine), to Sylvanus and Mary (Merrill) Poor, he was the first of his family to attend college, graduating from Bowdoin in 1835. He was descended from General Enoch Poor of the Revolutionary War. He joined his uncle's law firm, being called to the bar in 1838. Later Henry and his brother John Poor established a law practice in Bangor, Maine. By investing money in Maine's growing timber industry, the Poor brothers made a fortune. John became a minor railway magnate in association with the European and North American Railway, and was heavily involved in the building of the Maine rail network.

In 1849, John purchased the American Railroad Journal, of which Henry became manager and editor. In 1860, Henry Poor published History of Railroads and Canals in the United States, an attempt to compile comprehensive information about the financial and operational state of U.S. railroad companies. He later established H.V. and H.W. Poor Co. with his son, Henry William, and published a follow-up book, Poor's Manual of the Railroads of the United States, a guide for investors which was updated annually. Standard & Poor's traces its history back to this publication.

In 1862, Henry Poor was appointed a government commissioner to the newly chartered Union Pacific Railroad and left his position as editor of the Journal. That year he was elected as the railroad company's first Secretary. He left the company shortly thereafter.

Poor was a resident of Tuxedo Park, New York, which was founded by his good friend Pierre Lorillard in 1886. He also served as a co-founder of the American Geographical Society in 1851.

He died in Brookline, Massachusetts, at the age of 92.

== Publications ==
- Henry Varnum Poor. History of Railroads and Canals in the United States (1860) (online)
- Henry Varnum Poor. Poor's Manual of Railroads (1868) (online)
