= Bangor, Oldtown and Milford Railroad =

Railroad in Maine, US, 1836 to 1869

Bangor Old Town and Milford Railroad (B, O & M) is a defunct railroad and the first to be incorporated within the state of Maine, in the New England region of the Northeastern United States.

Originally chartered in as the Old Town Railway in 1832 the railway began service between Bangor, Maine, and Old Town, Maine November 30, 1836, and was acquired and subsequently dismantled by the European & North American Railroad in December 1869

== History ==
The First charter for the Old Town Railway Company was granted by the State of Maine in 1832 to Ira Wadleigh, Amos Roberts, Charles Ramsdell, Isaac Damon, Ebenezer French. Rufus Dwinel, and Edward and Samuel Smith were listed as owners[3] The Charter allowed for the construction of a railroad from Bangor to Old Town. Chief Engineer, Joseph W. Taney led a crew who surveyed the route and then began construction.

The railroad was to be standard gauge (4’-8 1/2”) and 11 miles long, running from the wharves of Bangor, along Harlow and Exchange Streets and out Stillwater Avenue to Old Town.

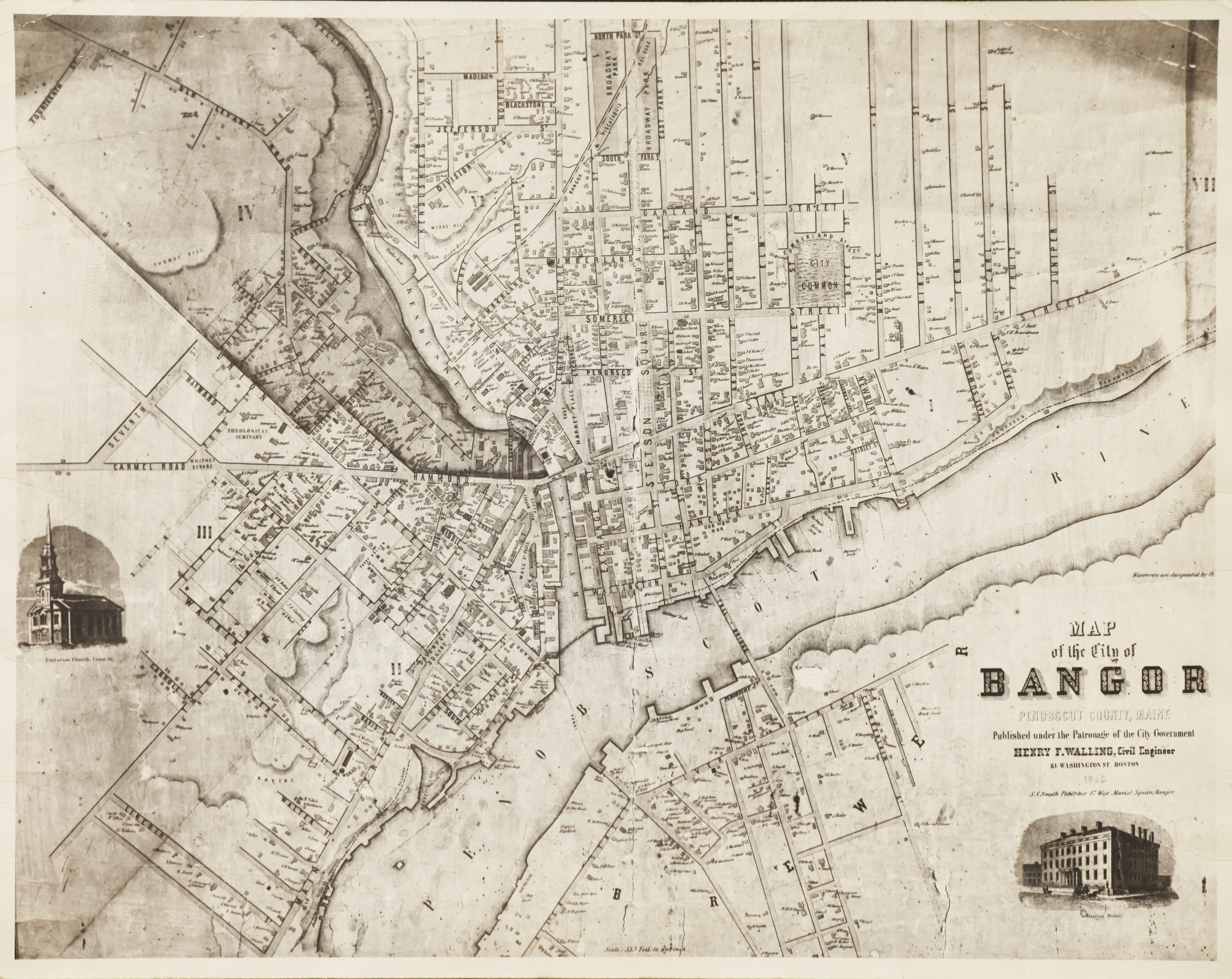
Detail of map of the City of Bangor, ME, 1853, showing location of terminus of B.& P. R.R.

The initial rails were of strap-iron laid on wood rails and cross ties.

Grading of the roadbed as well as piers for some of the bridges were started and then halted due to lack of funds. The railway was then acquired by the rival company Bangor & Piscataquis County Railroad Co. (for $50,000, which according to a Mr. Wadleigh, speaking in the 1870s, was never paid to the previous owners). However it was soon found that this charter was poorly improperly worded and work was again delayed.

On February 1, 1833, a new charter was granted to Moses Greenleaf, Henry W. Fuller, Benjamin P. Gilman (among others) under the name Bangor & Piscataquis Canal & Railroad Company (B. & P. C. & R. R. Co.) and after a sharp dispute the Bangor & Piscataquis County Railroad Co. was absorbed by the new Bangor & Piscataquis Canal & Railroad Company and in 1835 work once again resumed on the right-of-way.

The first train made passage over the railroad on November 6, 1836, and it formally opened to the public on November 28, 1836. The train was run on a trial basis for the first winter of ‘36-37 to verify that the new technology could run throughout the harsh winter months (a key component of the railroads usefulness was to provide transportation of lumber and goods between Bangor and Old Town when the Penobscot River was blocked by ice). The initial winter was deemed a success and the train ran Monday through Saturday through the winter only losing 2 or 3 days to inclement weather.

The railroad experienced an extended period of successful operation from 1837 to 1858.

Several Bangor residents were pivotal in the promotion of the railroad. Edward and Samuel Smith were key promoters, Edward's name is frequently mentioned in advertisements of corporation meetings in the local paper Bangor Daily Whig & Courier, but the railroad was primarily funded and controlled by Boston investors as witnessed by a list of their officers: President, Eliphalet Williams (Boston, MA); treasurer, William Hale(Boston, MA); superintendent, Hon. William Jackson, (Newton, MA); Engineer, A. W. Hoyt, (Deerfield, MA); assistant secretary and treasurer John Boardman, (Bangor, ME).

Of note is that the initial capitalization was listed at $300,000 (the initial stock sold at 18% premium due to initial public interest), and the project cost $354,000 upon completion ($30,000/mile including equipment and stations)

Harold Walker quoting Poor's Manual from 1860 lists the average yearly earrings of the railroad during this time from 1837 to 1859 as $9,973. The peak year of 1853 saw earnings of $24,235 and resulted in the only dividend paid by the railroad. Earnings were always modest and dropped off after 1853 (see Veazie years below) with a deficit of $2,337 logged in 1859

The Maine legislature authorized the sale of the railroad in 1847 and on November 1, 1849, it was sold (at a considerable loss) to a new company for only $60,000.

At this time the track was re-laid with heavier “chair” or “bull-head” rail and a single span of a planned bridge to Milford, to the north, was constructed.

General Samuel Veazie, a prosperous local mill owner through a series of lawsuits negotiated control of the railroad in 1854 On March 14, 1855, The name of the road was changed to Bangor, Old Town and Milford.

Veazie completed the bridge (costing $110,000) across the Penobscot river to mills located in Millford but did not continue the rails further to the north.

In 1867 the railroad was again upgraded with “t” type rails. Samuel Veazie died on March 12, 1868, and the control of the railroad was assumed by his heirs. During December 1869 the railroad suspended scheduled trains.

The last train ran on April 16, 1870[2]. and the line was sold by the heirs of the late Gen. Veazie to the European and North American Railroad.

Meanwhile in 1847 Daniel White, I. Washburn, Jr., Eben Webster, et al., incorporated a competing rail line, the Bangor & Orono Railroad Company, to build a railroad from Bangor to the village of Stillwater in Orono on the west bank of the Penobscot river. The new railroad was completed to Old Town, Bradley and Milford and the name changed to Penobscot Railroad Company in 1850. The competing railroad was plagued by financial troubles and incurred severe damage to bridges crossing the Stillwater and Penobscot during the spring of 1856[2] but occupied a more commercially viable route.

When the Bangor, Old Town and Milford was purchased by the European and North American Railroad they then removed the rails and bridges from the original western right-of-way running along Stillwater Avenue to focus traffic on the newer eastern right-of-way running along the west-bank of the Penobscot river.

The final removal of equipment from the old right-of-way, via a work train, was completed in June 1870.

== Equipment ==
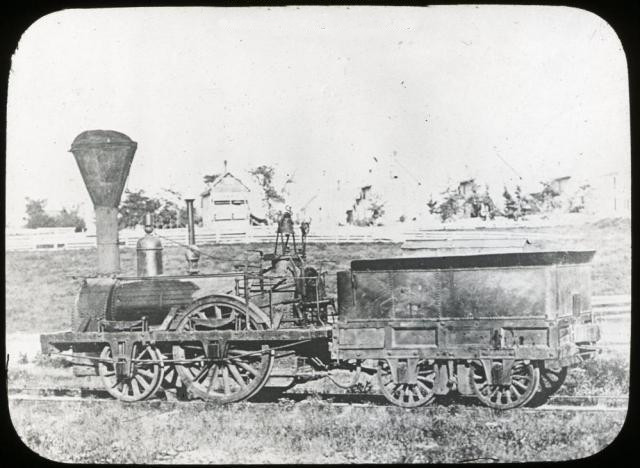
The Pioneer is one of the first two locomotives bought by the Bangor and Piscataquis Canal Rail Road

=== Locomotives ===
The new railroad acquired the first locomotive imported to the state of Maine, a British Planet Class designed by Robert Stephenson. As the road continued to grow it eventually operated seven locomotives in addition to other rolling stock.

Locomotive Roster
Name	Assigned No.	Date Acquired	Builder	Whyte notation	Driver Dia.	Cylinder Size	Note:
"Pioneer"	No.1	1832	Stephenson/Rothwell/Other	2-2-0	4'6"	11"dia x 16"	Builder likely Stephenson but perhaps under contract
"Bangor"	-	1836	Rothwell	2-2-0	4'6"	15"dia x 16"	Also known as "Number 6" or "Bib Smith"; Wrecked in 1855
"Boston"	No.2	1845	Hinkley & Drury	4-2-0	5'0"	11 1/2"dia x 20"	Builder's Number 51; Purchased from Old Colony R.R. as "Gov. Carver" 1851, sold in 1858.
"John Eliot"	-	1848	Hinkley & Drury	4-4-0	5'0"	14dia x 18"	Builders no. 153, Purchased from Old Colony
"Aroostook"	No.3	1858	Portland Co.	4-4-0	5'0"	13"dia x 20"	Builder's no. 91
"Milford"	No.4	1869	Hinkley & Wms.	4-4-0	5'2"	14" dia x 22"	Example
"St. Louis"/"Gen. Veazie"	No.5	1851	Lewis Kirk	4-4-0	5'0"	15" dia x 20"	purchased in 1858 as "St. Louis", renamed "Gen. Veazie." in 1867

=== Rolling stock ===
The Portland (Me.) Eastern Argus, for November 7, 1836, quotes the Bangor Advertiser, reporting that as the railway was about to open that there were six well finished carriages. They were given the names 'Bangor,' 'Orono,' 'Old Town,'Kenduskeag,' 'Boston' [only four names provided] The original carriages were shipped from England and were 18’ long and were described as being similar to the typical 1st or 2nd class British carriages of the period.

They were divided into individual compartments with doors that exited to the sides to open foot-boards for boarding and use of the conductor. The doors were locked from the exterior by the conductor after boarding. Tickets were collected through the window openings.

The passenger carriages were equipped with wheel-brakes similar to domestic stage-coaches of the period.

Carriages were linked by shackles of 3-layers of thick leather fastened with copper rivets. The shackles were passed over vertical pins extending from a beam extending from the underside of the carriages front and back.

The railroad later purchased additional passenger cars for $1,200 each from Davenport, Bridges and Kirk, of Cambridge, MA

By 1869 the railroad listed 2- passenger cars, 1-Baggage car, 9- 14’ long flat cars, 2-30’ long flat cars, and 9- 10’ long box cars. The freight cars were typically not equipped with brakes and were stopped or kept from rolling by passing a “stout stick” through the spokes of the car wheels.
