= Henry William Poor =

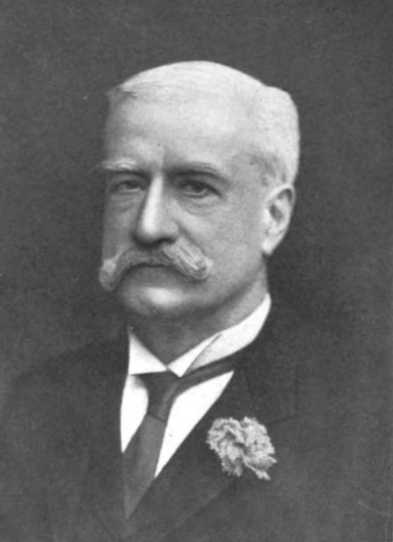
- Born: June 16, 1844; Bangor, Maine
- Died: April 13, 1915 (aged 70); New York, New York
- Education: Harvard College
- Occupations: Banker, stockbroker, writer
- Spouse: Constance Evelyn Brandon (m. 1880)
- Children: 5

Henry William Poor (June 16, 1844 – April 13, 1915) was an American banker, stockbroker, and author.

== Biography ==
=== Early life ===
Henry William Poor was born in Bangor, Maine in 1844, the son of Henry Varnum Poor. The family moved to New York City when he was five years old, and he spent his youth there. He attended Harvard College, graduating in 1865. The firm that he and his father established in 1868, H. V. & H. W. Poor, which published the annually-updated reference book for investors Poor's Manual of the Railroads of the United States; the publication was a predecessor of what was to become Standard & Poor's.

He married Constance Evelyn Brandon on February 4, 1880, and they had five children. He was also reputed to be a participant in orgies in New York, with his friend Stanford White.

=== Career ===
He became prominent as a stockbroker and investor, but had to liquidate his business in 1908 following some major losses.

He was also widely known as a book collector and a patron of the arts.

=== Death ===
He died in New York City on April 13, 1915.
