= Knox and Lincoln Railroad =

Overview
- Dates of operation: 1849–1901
- Successor: Maine Central Railroad

Technical
- Track gauge: 1,435 mm (4 ft 8 1/2 in)
- Length: 48.57 miles (78.17 km)

The Knox and Lincoln Railroad was a railway company in the United States. It was chartered in 1849 and opened a line between Woolwich, Maine, and Rockland, Maine, in 1871. The Maine Central Railroad leased the company in 1891, at which point its line became part of the Rockland Branch. The company was merged with the Maine Central in 1901.

== History ==
The Kennebec and Portland Railroad began building between Bath, Maine, on the Kennebec River, and Yarmouth Junction in 1849. The Penobscot and Kennebec Railroad was chartered that same year to build east from Bath to Rockland, Maine. As Penobscot and Kennebec Railroad was already the name of a railroad in central Maine, the company was renamed the Penobscot, Lincoln and Kennebec Railroad. The name was changed again 1864 to the Knox and Lincoln Railroad. The company opened a line between Woolwich, Maine, on the east bank of the Kennebec across from Bath, and Rockland, Maine, on October 31, 1871. A train ferry connected Bath and Woolwich.

The company constructed a 2-mile (3.2 km) branch to serve Rockland's docks in the mid-1880s. The Maine Central Railroad first attempted to acquire the company in 1871 and again in the early 1880s. The Maine Central leased the company in 1891, after some machinations involving the creation of the short-lived Penobscot Shore Line Railroad and Knox and Lincoln Railway. The latter name persisted until the Maine Central acquired the company outright on February 20, 1901. Under the Maine Central, the company's line was combined with the Maine Central's line between Brunswick, Maine, and Bath to create the Rockland Branch. The Kennebec River was finally bridged in 1927 with the construction of the Carlton Bridge.
