= S&P Global Ratings =

American credit rating agency

- Type: Subsidiary
- Industry: Financial services
- Predecessor: Poor's Publishing; Standard Statistics
- Founded: 1860; 166 years ago 1941; 85 years ago (present corporation status)
- Founder: Henry Varnum Poor
- Headquarters: 55 Water Street, Lower Manhattan, New York City., U.S.
- Key people: Yann Le Pallec (President, since November 1, 2024)
- Revenue: ▲US$4.72 billion (2025)
- Parent: S&P Global
- Website: spglobal.com/ratings/

S&P Global Ratings (previously Standard & Poor's and informally known as S&P) is an American credit rating agency (CRA) and a division of S&P Global that publishes credit ratings on debt issued by companies, governments and structured finance vehicles. S&P is considered the largest of the Big Three credit-rating agencies, which also include Moody's Ratings and Fitch Ratings. Its former equity and fund research business was sold to CFRA in 2016 equity-index products sit with S&P Dow Jones Indices.

== Corporate history ==
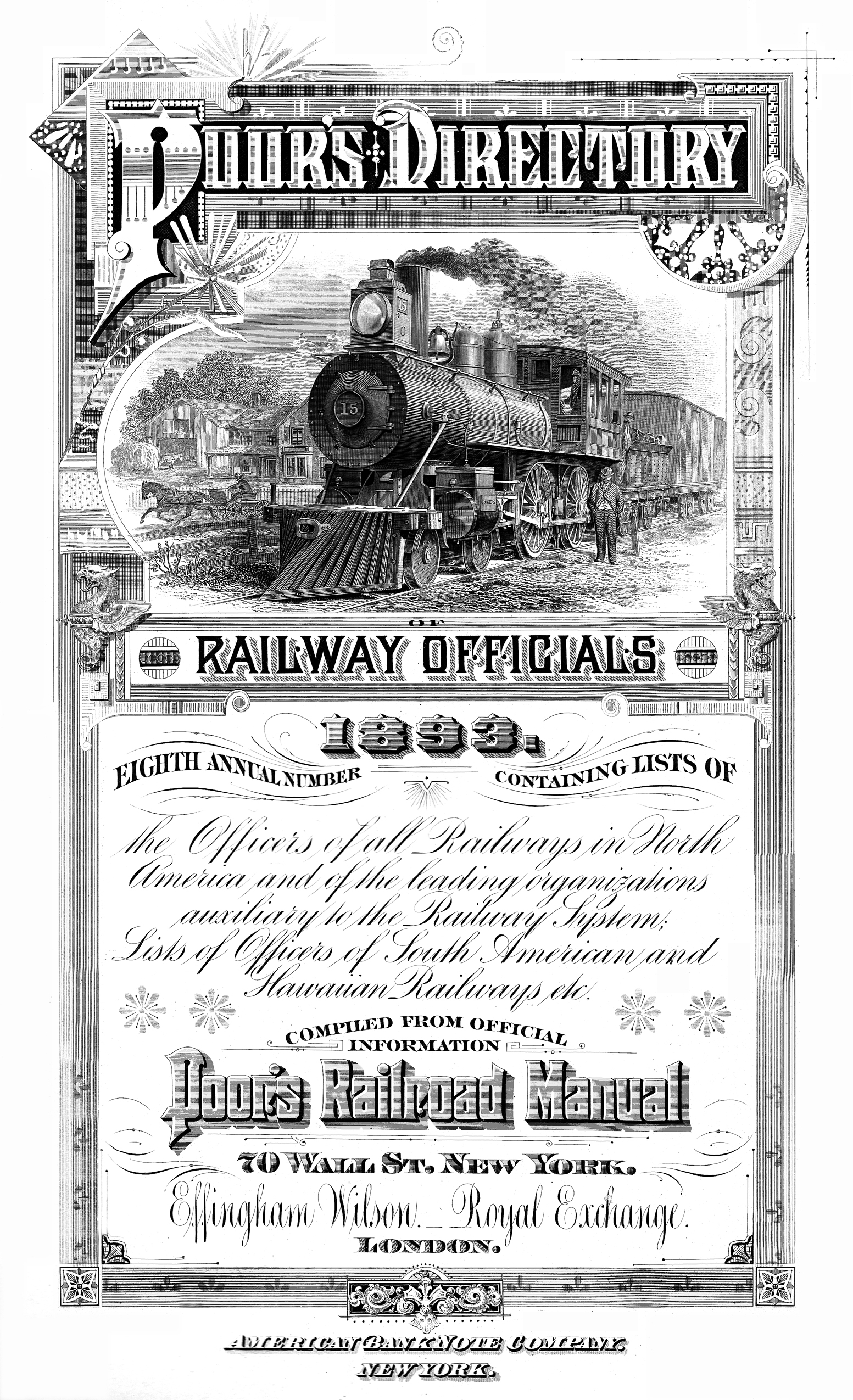
Poor's Directory of Railroad Officials, 1893 (frontispiece)

The company traces its history back to 1860, with the publication by Henry Varnum Poor of History of Railroads and Canals in the United States. This book compiled comprehensive information about the financial and operational state of U.S. railroad companies. In 1868, Henry Varnum Poor established H. V. and H. W. Poor Co. with his son, Henry William Poor, and published two annually updated hardback guidebooks, Poor's Manual of the Railroads of the United States and Poor's Directory of Railway Officials.

In 1906, Luther Lee Blake founded the Standard Statistics Bureau, with the view to providing financial information on non-railroad companies. Instead of an annually published book, Standard Statistics would use 5-by-7-inch cards, allowing for more frequent updates.

In 1941, Paul Talbot Babson purchased Poor's Publishing and merged it with Standard Statistics to become Standard & Poor's Corp. In 1966, the company was acquired by The McGraw-Hill Companies, extending McGraw-Hill into the field of financial information services.

== Credit ratings ==
As a credit rating agency (CRA), the company issues credit ratings for the debt of public and private companies, and public borrowers such as governments, governmental agencies, and cities. It is one of several CRAs that have been designated a nationally recognized statistical rating organization (NRSRO) by the U.S. Securities and Exchange Commission.

=== Long-term credit ratings ===
Countries by Standard & Poor's long-term sovereign rating. Legend: AAA / AA+ / AA / AA- / A+ / A / A- / BBB+ / BBB / BBB-; BB+ / BB / BB- / B+ / B / B- / CCC+ / CCC / CCC- / SD/D

S&P rates borrowers on a scale from AAA to D. Intermediate ratings are offered at each level between AA and CCC (such as BBB+, BBB, and BBB−). For some borrowers issuances, the company may also offer guidance (termed a "credit watch") as to whether it is likely to be upgraded (positive), downgraded (negative) or stable.

==== Investment grade ====
- AAA: An obligor rated 'AAA' has extremely strong capacity to meet its financial commitments. 'AAA' is the highest issuer credit rating assigned by Standard & Poor's.
- AA: An obligor rated 'AA' has very strong capacity to meet its financial commitments. It differs from the highest-rated obligors only to a small degree. Includes:
  - AA+: equivalent to Moody's Aa1 (high quality, with very low credit risk, but susceptibility to long-term risks appears somewhat greater)
  - AA: equivalent to Aa2
  - AA−: equivalent to Aa3
- A: An obligor rated 'A' has strong capacity to meet its financial commitments but is somewhat more susceptible to the adverse effects of changes in circumstances and economic conditions than obligors in higher-rated categories.
  - A+: equivalent to A1
  - A: equivalent to A2
- BBB: An obligor rated 'BBB' has adequate capacity to meet its financial commitments. However, adverse economic conditions or changing circumstances are more likely to lead to a weakened capacity of the obligor to meet its financial commitments.

==== Non-investment grade (also known as speculative-grade) ====
- BB: An obligor rated 'BB' is less vulnerable in the near term than other lower-rated obligors. However, it faces major ongoing uncertainties and exposure to adverse business, financial, or economic conditions, which could lead to the obligor's inadequate capacity to meet its financial commitments.
- B: An obligor rated 'B' is more vulnerable than the obligors rated 'BB', but the obligor currently has the capacity to meet its financial commitments. Adverse business, financial, or economic conditions will likely impair the obligor's capacity or willingness to meet its financial commitments.
- CCC: An obligor rated 'CCC' is currently vulnerable, and is dependent upon favorable business, financial, and economic conditions to meet its financial commitments.
- CC: An obligor rated 'CC' is currently highly vulnerable.
- C: highly vulnerable, perhaps in bankruptcy or in arrears but still continuing to pay out on obligations
- R: An obligor rated 'R' is under regulatory supervision owing to its financial condition. During the pendency of the regulatory supervision, the regulators may have the power to favor one class of obligations over others or pay some obligations and not others.
- SD: has selectively defaulted on some obligations
- D: has defaulted on obligations and S&P believes that it will generally default on most or all obligations
- NR: not rated

=== Short-term issue credit ratings ===
The company rates specific issues on a scale from A-1 to D. Within the A-1 category, it can be designated with a plus sign (+). This indicates that the issuer's commitment to meet its obligation is very strong. Country risk and currency of repayment of the obligor to meet the issue obligation are factored into the credit analysis and reflected in the issue rating.

- A-1: obligor's capacity to meet its financial commitment on the obligation is strong
- A-2: is susceptible to adverse economic conditions however the obligor's capacity to meet its financial commitment on the obligation is satisfactory
- A-3: adverse economic conditions are likely to weaken the obligor's capacity to meet its financial commitment on the obligation
- B: has significant speculative characteristics. The obligor currently has the capacity to meet its financial obligation but faces major ongoing uncertainties that could impact its financial commitment on the obligation
- C: currently vulnerable to nonpayment and is dependent upon favorable business, financial and economic conditions for the obligor to meet its financial commitment on the obligation
- D: is in payment default. Obligation not made on due date and grace period may not have expired. The rating is also used upon the filing of a bankruptcy petition.

== Governance scores ==
S&P has had a variety of approaches to reflecting its opinion of the relative strength of a company's corporate governance practices. Corporate governance serves as investor protection against potential governance-related losses of value, or failure to create value.

=== CGS scores ===
S&P developed criteria and methodology for assessing corporate governance. It started issuing Corporate Governance Scores (CGS) in 2000. CGS assessed companies' corporate governance practices. They were assigned at the request of the company being assessed, were non-public (although companies were free to disclose them to the public and sometimes did) and were limited to public U.S. corporations. In 2005, S&P stopped issuing CGS.

=== GAMMA scores ===
S&P's Governance, Accountability, Management Metrics and Analysis (GAMMA) scores were designed for equity investors in emerging markets and focused on non-financial-risk assessment, and in particular, assessment of corporate governance risk. S&P discontinued providing stand-alone governance scores in 2011, "while continuing to incorporate governance analysis in global and local scale credit ratings".

=== Management and Governance criteria ===
In November 2012, S&P published its criteria for evaluating insurers and non-financial enterprises' management and governance credit factors. These scores are not standalone, but rather a component used by S&P in assessing an enterprise's overall creditworthiness. S&P updated its management and governance scoring methodology as part of a larger effort to include enterprise risk management analysis in its rating of debt issued by non-financial companies. "Scoring of management and governance is made on a scale of weak, fair, satisfactory or strong, depending on the mix of positive and negative management scores and the existence and severity of governance deficiencies."

== Downgrades of countries ==
=== Downgrade of U.S. long-term credit rating ===
On August 5, 2011, following enactment of the Budget Control Act of 2011, S&P lowered the US's sovereign long-term credit rating from AAA to AA+. The press release sent with the decision said, in part:

- The downgrade reflects our opinion that the fiscal consolidation plan that Congress and the Administration recently agreed to falls short of what, in our view, would be necessary to stabilize the government's medium-term debt dynamics.
- More broadly, the downgrade reflects our view that the effectiveness, stability, and predictability of American policymaking and political institutions have weakened at a time of ongoing fiscal and economic challenges to a degree more than we envisioned when we assigned a negative outlook to the rating on April 18, 2011.
- Since then, we have changed our view of the difficulties in bridging the gulf between the political parties over fiscal policy, which makes us pessimistic about the capacity of Congress and the Administration to be able to leverage their agreement this week into a broader fiscal consolidation plan that stabilizes the government's debt dynamics any time soon.

The United States Department of the Treasury, where Acting Assistant Secretary for Economic Policy John Bellows had first called S&P's attention to its $2 trillion error in calculating the ten-year deficit reduction under the Budget Control Act, commented, "The magnitude of this mistake – and the haste with which S&P changed its principal rationale for action when presented with this error – raise fundamental questions about the credibility and integrity of S&P's ratings action." The following day, S&P acknowledged in writing the US$2 trillion error in its calculations, saying the error "had no impact on the rating decision" and adding:

In taking a longer term horizon of 10 years, the U.S. net general government debt level with the current assumptions would be $20.1 trillion (85% of 2021 GDP). With the original assumptions, the debt level was projected to be $22.1 trillion (93% of 2021 GDP).

In 2013, S&P was sued by the Department of Justice for its role in the 2008 mortgage crisis. Although it initially alleged that this suit was brought in retaliation for its downgrade, S&P retracted this allegation as part of its master settlement agreement.

=== Downgrade of France's long-term credit rating ===
On November 11, 2011, S&P erroneously announced the cut of France's triple-A rating (AAA). French leaders said that the error was inexcusable and called for even more regulation of private credit rating agencies. On January 13, 2012, S&P truly cut France's AAA rating, lowering it to AA+. This was the first time since 1975 that Europe's second-biggest economy, France, had been downgraded to AA+. The same day, S&P downgraded the rating of eight other European countries: Austria, Spain, Italy, Portugal, Malta, Slovenia, Slovakia and Cyprus.

== Publications ==
The company publishes The Outlook, a weekly investment advisory newsletter for individuals and professional investors, published continuously since 1922. Credit Week is produced by Standard & Poor's Credit Market Services Group. It offers a comprehensive view of the global credit markets, providing credit rating news and analysis. Standard & Poor's offers numerous other editorials, investment commentaries and news updates for financial markets, companies, industries, stocks, bonds, funds, economic outlook and investor education. All publications are available to subscribers.

S&P Dow Jones Indices publishes several blogs that do not require a subscription to access. These include Indexology, VIX Views and Housing Views.

== Criticism ==
=== Role in the 2008 financial crisis ===
Credit rating agencies such as S&P have been cited for contributing to the 2008 financial crisis. Credit ratings of AAA (the highest rating available) were given to large portions of even the riskiest pools of loans in the collateralized debt obligation (CDO) market. When the real estate bubble burst in 2007, many loans went bad due to falling housing prices and the inability of bad creditors to refinance. Investors who had trusted the AAA rating to mean that CDO were low-risk had purchased large amounts that later experienced staggering drops in value or could not be sold at any price. For example, institutional investors lost $125 million on $340.7 million worth of CDOs issued by Credit Suisse Group, despite being rated AAA by S&P.

Companies pay S&P, Moody's, and Fitch to rate their debt issues. As a result, some critics have contended that the credit ratings agencies are beholden to these issuers in a conflict of interests and that their ratings are not as objective as they ought to be, due to this "pay to play" model.

In 2015, Standard and Poor's paid $1.5 billion to the U.S. Justice Department, various state governments, and the California Public Employees' Retirement System to settle lawsuits asserting its inaccurate ratings defrauded investors.

=== Criticism of sovereign debt ratings ===
In April 2009, the company called for "new faces" in the Irish government, which was seen as interfering in the democratic process. In a subsequent statement they said they were "misunderstood".

S&P acknowledged making a US$2 trillion error in its justification for downgrading the credit rating of the United States in 2011, but stated that it "had no impact on the rating decision".

=== Australian Federal Court decision ===
In November 2012, Judge Jayne Jagot of the Federal Court of Australia found that "A reasonably competent ratings agency could not have rated the Rembrandt 2006-3 CPDO AAA in these circumstances"; and "S&P's rating of AAA of the Rembrandt 2006-2 and 2006-3 CPDO notes was misleading and deceptive and involved the publication of information or statements false in material particulars and otherwise involved negligent misrepresentations to the class of potential investors in Australia, which included Local Government Financial Services Pty Ltd and the councils, because by the AAA rating there was conveyed a representation that in S&P's opinion the capacity of the notes to meet all financial obligations was 'extremely strong' and a representation that S&P had reached this opinion based on reasonable grounds and as the result of an exercise of reasonable care when neither was true and S&P also knew not to be true at the time made."

In conclusion, Jagot found Standard & Poor's to be jointly liable along with ABN Amro and Local Government Financial Services Pty Ltd.

== Antitrust review ==
In November 2009, ten months after launching an investigation, the European Commission (EC) formally charged S&P with abusing its position as the sole provider of international securities identification codes for United States of America securities by requiring European financial firms and data vendors to pay licensing fees for their use. The EC said in its statement of objections which lays the groundwork for an adverse finding against S&P: "This behavior amounts to unfair pricing ... The (numbers) are indispensable for a number of operations that financial institutions carry out – for instance, reporting to authorities or clearing and settlement – and cannot be substituted."

S&P has run the CUSIP Service Bureau, the only International Securities Identification Number (ISIN) issuer in the US, on behalf of the American Bankers Association. In its formal statement of objections, the EC alleged "that S&P is abusing this monopoly position by enforcing the payment of licence fees for the use of US ISINs by (a) banks and other financial services providers in the EEA and (b) information service providers in the EEA". It claims that comparable agencies elsewhere in the world either do not charge fees at all, or do so on the basis of distribution cost, rather than usage.

== See also ==
- Global Industry Classification Standard
- List of countries by credit rating
- Nationally recognized statistical rating organization
- Moody's Ratings
- Fitch Ratings
