= William Norris (locomotive builder) =

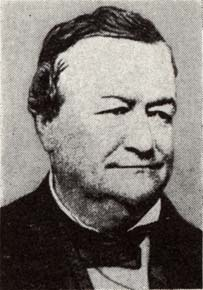
William Norris, Founder of the Norris Locomotive Works

William Norris (July 2, 1802 – January 5, 1867) was an American steam locomotive builder. He founded the Norris Locomotive Works and through this company pioneered the use of the 4-2-0 (the Norris type) locomotive type in America during the 1840s.

In 1837, William Norris was elected as a member to the American Philosophical Society.
