= Poor's Manual of the Railroads of the United States =

- Author: Henry Varnum Poor
- Language: English
- Subject: Reference/Railroads
- Publisher: H.V. and H.W. Poor Co.
- Publication date: 1868-1924
- Publication place: United States
- Media type: Book
- LC Class: HE2721
- Preceded by: History of Railroads and Canals in the United States
- Text: Poor's Manual of the Railroads of the United States at HathiTrust

Poor's Manual of the Railroads of the United States, later shortened to Poor's Manual of Railroads, was a reference book by Henry Varnum Poor intended for investors and published annually from 1868 to 1924.

== History ==
Each volume detailed the history, ownership, equipment, and finances of railroads in the United States, including maps of the largest railroad systems at that point in time. Later editions would limit the scope to steam-powered railroads while expanding the coverage to include Canada and the principal railroads of Mexico, Cuba, and Central America.

In addition to the 57 annual volumes that were published, supplements were occasionally produced under the title Intermediate Manual of Railroads, and a companion Directory of Railway Officials was also introduced. In 1922, a collaboration with Moody's resulted in a collection of the Manual with other financial documents under the title Moodys Manual of Railroads and Corporation Securities.

Henry Varnum Poor initially published the books with his son, Henry William Poor, as a follow-up to his 1860 book History of Railroads and Canals in the United States. The Manual's success led to annual updates funded by advertisements inside the book from manufacturers, banks, and insurance companies that did business in the railroad industry. After the author's death in 1905, the works would continue to be released by Poor's Publishing Company, a predecessor of Standard & Poor's.
