= Androscoggin Railroad =

Overview
- Parent company: Maine Central Railroad (1871–1911)
- Dates of operation: 1848–1911
- Successor: Maine Central Railroad

Technical
- Track gauge: 1,435 mm (4 ft 8 1/2 in)
- Previous gauge: 5 ft 6 in (1,676 mm)

The Androscoggin Railroad was a railway company in the United States. It was incorporated in 1848 and completed its initial line in 1852. Its main line ran between Brunswick, Maine, and Farmington, Maine, and it also had a branch to Lewiston, Maine, for a total length of 67.5 miles (108.6 km). The Maine Central Railroad leased the company in 1871 and merged it in 1911.

== History ==
The Androscoggin and Kennebec Railroad completed a 5 ft 6 in (1,676 mm) line between Danville Junction, on the Atlantic and St. Lawrence Railroad, and Waterville, Maine, in 1849. The Androscoggin Railroad was incorporated on August 10, 1848, to build north from the Androscoggin and Kennebec at Leeds Junction, northeast of Lewiston, Maine, to Farmington, Maine. In December 1952, the Androscoggin opened a line, also 5 ft 6 in (1,676 mm), to Livermore Falls, Maine. The full line to Farmington opened in June 1859.

A dispute with the Androscoggin and Kennebec led the Androscoggin to begin building a new 4 ft 8 1/2 in (1,435 mm) line south to Brunswick, Maine, and a connection with the Kennebec and Portland Railroad. The company also planned to convert its original line to Farmington to standard gauge, leading to further legal disputes with the Androscoggin and Kennebec. The 26-mile (42 km) line to Brunswick, and a 5-mile (8.0 km) branch to Lewiston, opened in 1861. The gauge conversion of the original route was also completed that year.

The financing of the Brunswick extension was unconnected to the original mortgage on the line between Leeds and Farmington. When the company defaulted on that mortgage in 1865, a new company, the Leeds and Farmington Railroad, was formed to acquire it. The Androscoggin Railroad continued to own and operate the newer line to Brunswick and Lewiston. The Androscoggin leased the Leeds and Farmington in 1867, and was itself leased by the Maine Central Railroad on June 29, 1871. The Maine Central merged the Leeds and Farmington on November 16, 1874, and the Androscoggin on August 19, 1911.

== Lines ==
Under the Maine Central, the company's lines were organized into two branches. The Farmington Branch, 47.8 miles (76.9 km) long, ran from Farmington via Leeds Junction to Crowley's Junction, where the line to Lewiston diverged. The 19.6-mile (31.5 km) branch between Lewiston and Brunswick was designated the Lewiston Branch, sometimes also called the Lower Lewiston Branch. Portions of both are extant.
