= Sanford Mills Historic District =

Historic district in Maine, United States

- U.S. National Register of Historic Places
- U.S. Historic district
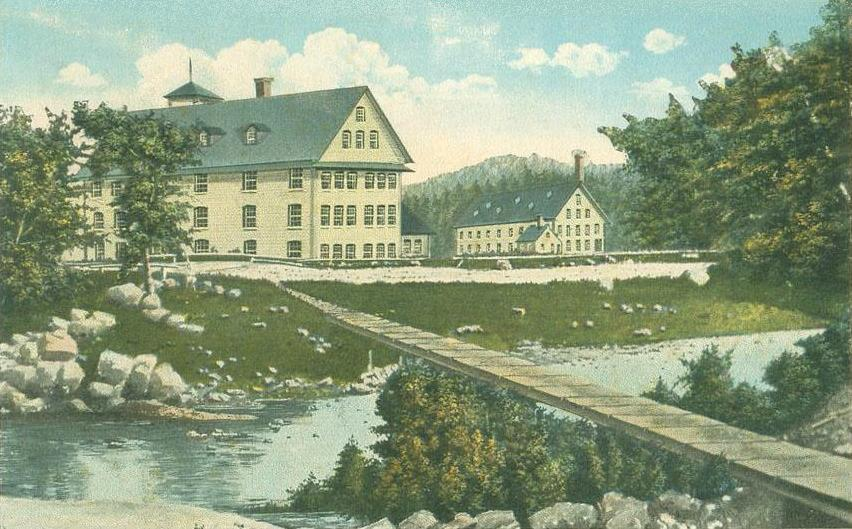
- Postcard view of the original Sanford Mills, c. 1919

- Location within Maine Location within the United States
- Location: Bounded by Washington St., Pioneer Ave., Emery St., and Weaver Dr., Sanford, Maine
- Coordinates: 43°26′24″N 70°46′17″W
- Area: 7.5 acres (3.0 ha)
- Built: 1910
- Architect: Clark, George A.; et al.
- Architectural style: Italianate, Modern Movement
- NRHP reference No.: 09000880
- Added to NRHP: November 4, 2009

The Sanford Mills Historic District encompasses a large industrial complex in the center of Sanford, Maine, United States. From 1867 to 1955, the property was the site of a major textile manufacturing operation that was a major local employer. The site, flanking the Mousam River just north of Sanford's central business district, was listed on the National Register of Historic Places in 2009.

== Description and history ==
The Sanford Mills complex occupies about 7.5 acres (3.0 ha) of land, roughly bounded by Washington Street, Weaver Drive, Emery Street, and Pioneer Avenue. It includes fourteen buildings, the oldest surviving one dating to 1882, and the heavily channelized stretch of the Mousam River, along with two river crossings. The buildings on the site are reflective of two significant phases of construction. The first is the pre-1890 phase, in which predominantly wood-frame structures were built, although some of these buildings were later added onto in brick and concrete, while the latter phase, after 1910, involved exclusively brick and concrete construction.

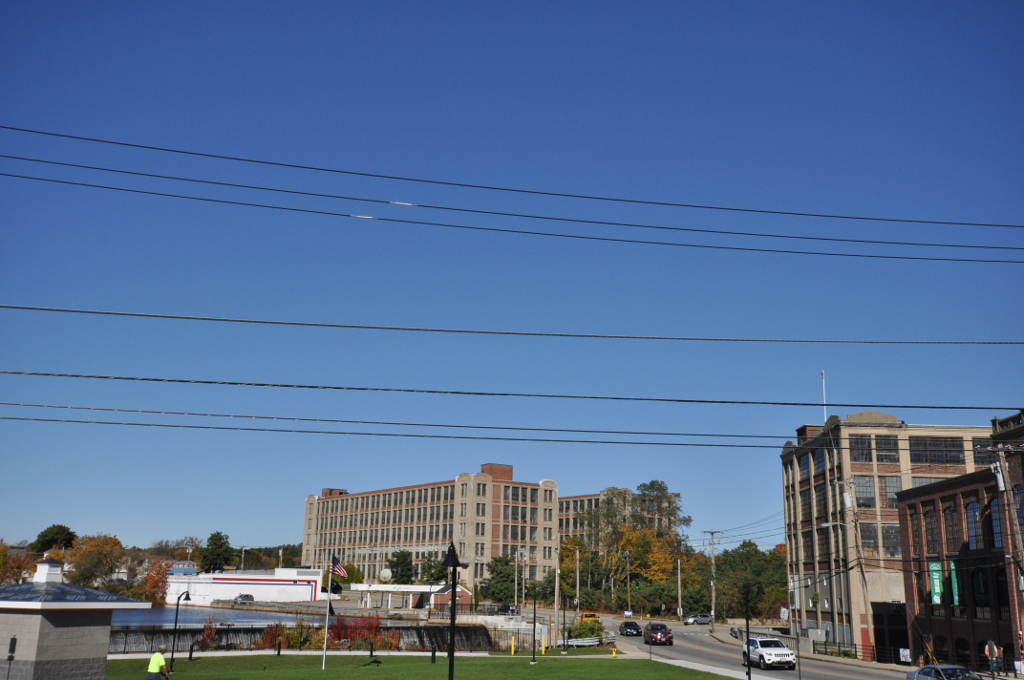
Former mills in 2015

The Mousam River in the Sanford area was used for industrial purposes beginning in the 18th century, when grist mills and saw mills were built along its banks. The town was also the site of a cottage industry in textile manufacture in the early 19th century. In 1867 Thomas Goodall, an English immigrant who had established a successful mill in Troy, New Hampshire, arrived in Sanford, purchased a number of the mills and associated water rights, and enlarged an existing flannel mill. Goodall successfully produced heavy, richly decorated plush mohair fabrics. The buildings Goodall constructed before 1882 have all been demolished, many of them during the modernization phase in the 1910s. The Goodall family operated the mills until 1953, when they sold them to the Burlington Mills Corporation. Burlington shut the mills down in 1955. The buildings are now used by a variety of smaller businesses.

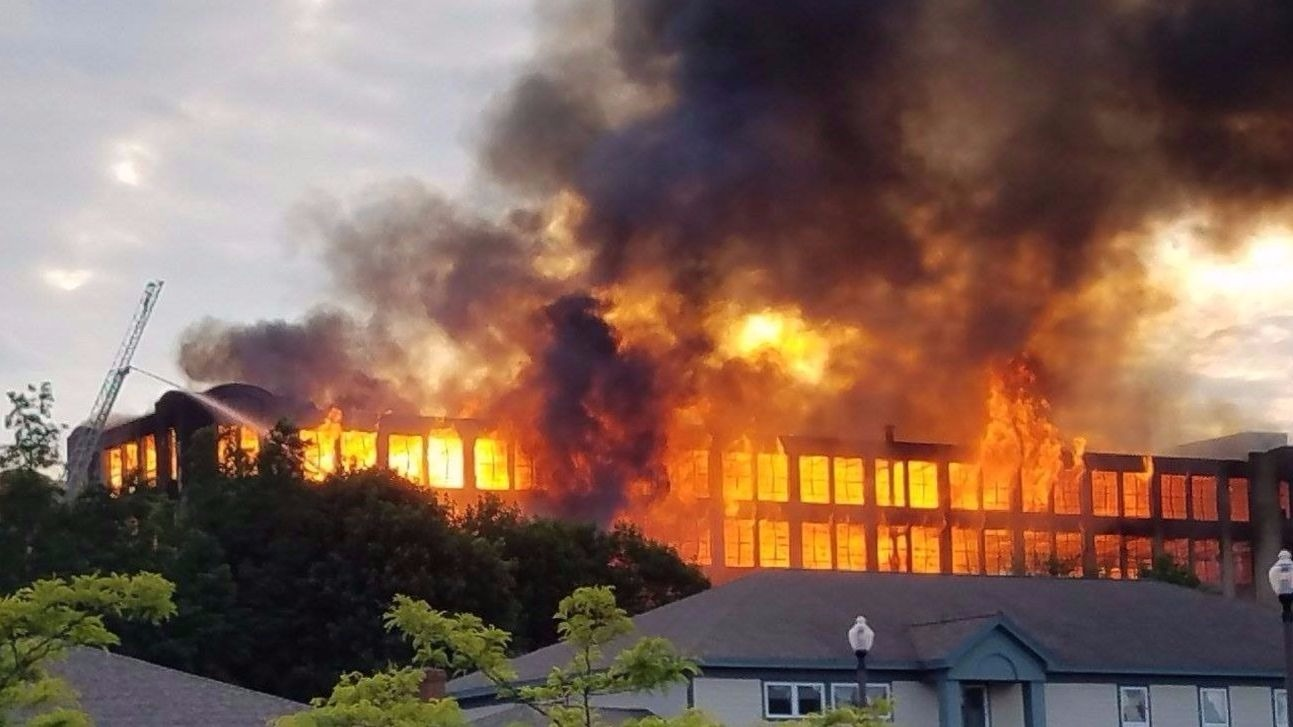
2017 mill fire

In 2017, the largest mill fire Sanford firefighters have ever battled erupted on Friday, June 23. The flaming five-story back building of the former Stenton Trust Mill complex at 13 River Street drew more than 100 firefighters from 20 communities to battle the blaze. The 294,000-square-foot complex, which was built in 1922 as a textile mill, includes two five-story brick and concrete buildings and a one-story connecting structure. Three boys from Sanford, two 13-year-olds and a 12-year-old, were charged two days later with felony arson in connection with the massive fire. Later, two of the boys pleaded guilty to counts of criminal mischief. The mills' demolition began in September, 2018 with the city working with the EPA to ensure all hazardous materials were removed.

== See also ==
- National Register of Historic Places listings in York County, Maine
