= York and Cumberland Railroad (Maine) =

Overview
- Dates of operation: 1846–1865
- Successor: Portland and Rochester Railroad

Technical
- Track gauge: 1,435 mm (4 ft 8 1/2 in)
- Length: 18 miles (29 km)

The York and Cumberland Railroad was a railway company in the United States. It was incorporated in 1846 and opened a line between Portland, Maine, and Bar Mills, Maine, in 1853. The company was reorganized as the Portland and Rochester Railroad in 1865. Its line, which formed the eastern end of the Portland and Rochester Railroad main line, became part of the Boston and Maine Railroad and was subsequently abandoned.

== History ==
The Portland, Saco and Portsmouth Railroad completed a line between its titular cities in 1842, giving it a monopoly on traffic between Portland, Maine, and points south. The York and Cumberland Railroad was incorporated on July 30, 1846, in an attempt to break that monopoly. Between 1850 and 1853 the company constructed an 18-mile (29 km) line from Portland to Bar Mills, Maine, on the Saco River. The company was authorized to continue southwest and form connection with a company in New Hampshire, but this proved beyond its resources.

The company was reorganized as the Portland and Rochester Railroad on November 1, 1865. The new company received financial support from the city of Portland, and finally reached Rochester, New Hampshire, in 1871. The complete line became the Portland and Rochester Railroad main line, and eventually part of the Boston and Maine Railroad's Worcester, Nashua and Portland Division. The line was abandoned between 1911 and 1961.
