= Portland, Rutland, Oswego and Chicago Railroad =

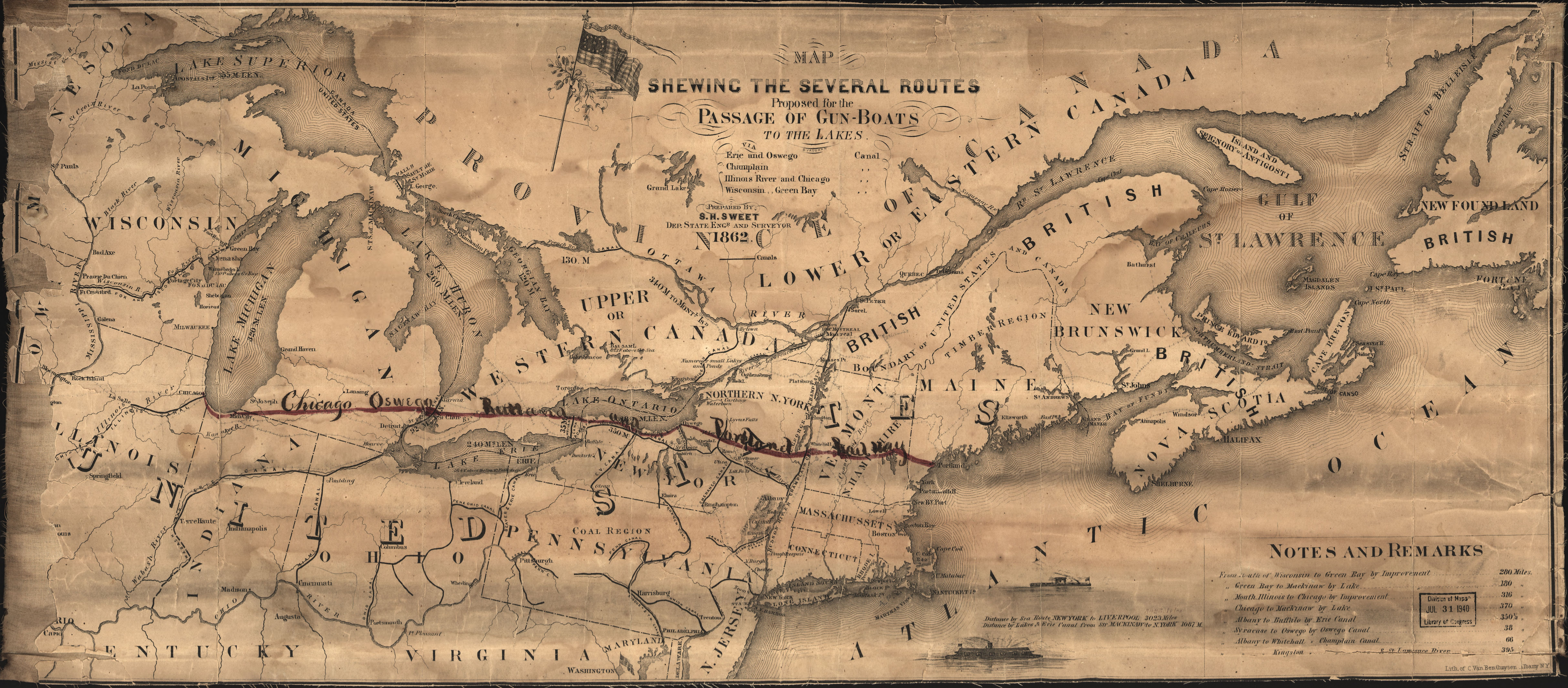
The line drawn on an 1862 map

The Portland, Rutland, Oswego and Chicago Railroad was a plan for a railroad between Portland, Maine and Chicago, Illinois, proposed as the first step of a transcontinental railroad. The plans were made by John A. Poor of Portland in the 1860s, but he died in 1871 before they could be finalized.

== History ==
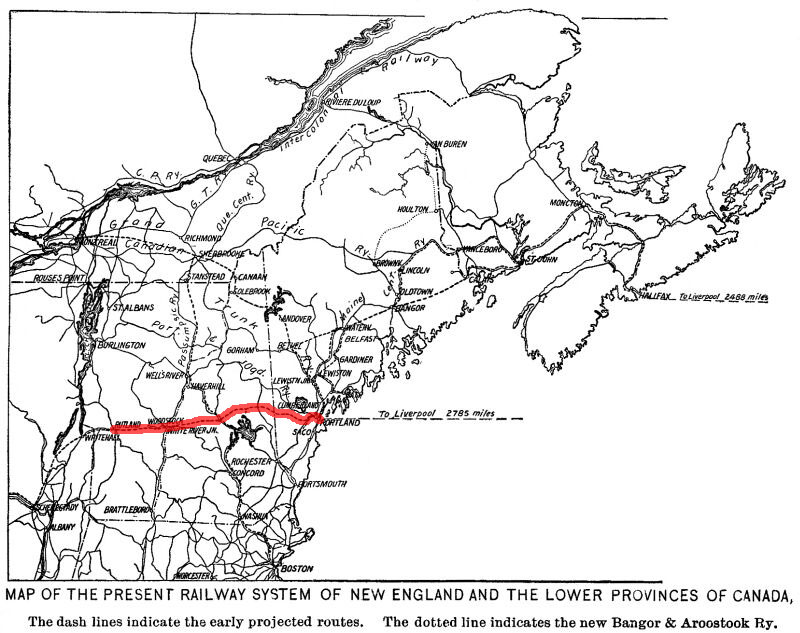
The Portland and Rutland Railroad

The Portland and Rutland Railroad was chartered in Maine on March 6, 1868 and in New Hampshire on July 3, 1868. The companies were authorized to build a railroad from Portland west to Danbury, New Hampshire on the Northern Railroad. From Danbury to White River Junction, Vermont, the line would use the Northern Railroad, and it would use the full length of the Woodstock Railroad west to Woodstock, Vermont. The Rutland and Woodstock Railroad was chartered to continue the line to Rutland.

The New England and Oswego Railroad was chartered in 1870 in New York, as a connection from Fort Ann on the Rensselaer and Saratoga Railroad's Saratoga and Whitehall Railroad west to the port of Oswego on Lake Ontario. Between Rutland and Fort Ann traffic would use the R&S's Troy, Salem and Rutland Railroad, Rutland and Whitehall Railroad and Saratoga and Whitehall Railroad.

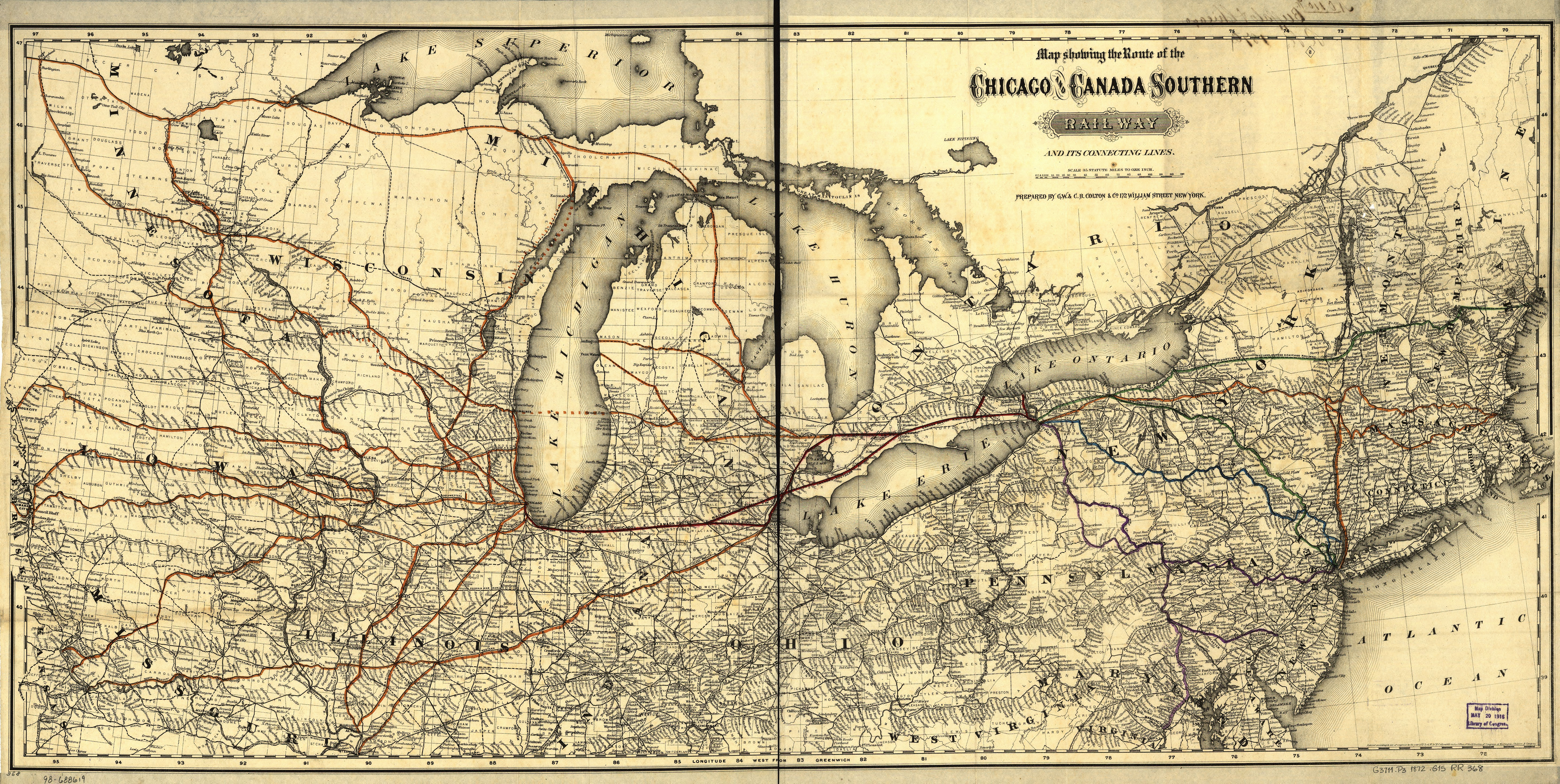
1872 map, using the Chicago and Canada Southern Railway instead of the Michigan Air-Line Railroad

In 1871 the Portland and Rutland, Rutland and Woodstock and New England and Oswego merged to form the Portland, Rutland, Oswego and Chicago Railroad, planned to continue west from Oswego along the Lake Ontario Shore Railroad, Canada Southern Railway and Michigan Air-Line Railroad to Chicago. In July of that year, five of the six independent companies along the line agreed to merge, and a meeting was scheduled for September 29 to try again. However, John A. Poor died on September 5 and the project died. The three companies west of Oswego went on to become part of the New York Central Railroad system.
