= Norris Locomotive Works =

American steam locomotive manufacturing company

Coordinates: 39.9617°N 75.1667°W

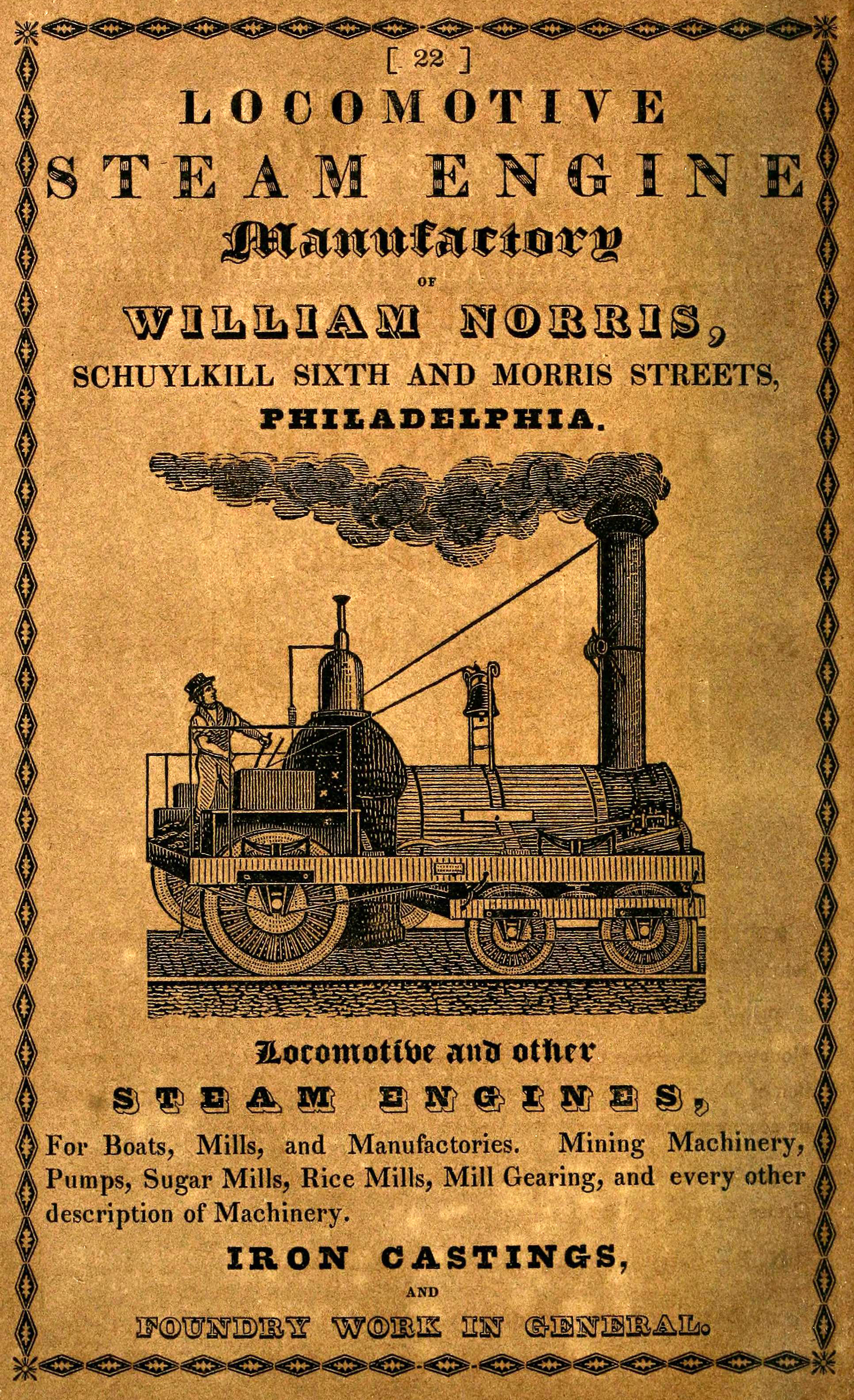
An 1842 advertisement for the Norris Locomotive Works

The Norris Locomotive Works was a steam locomotive manufacturing company based in Philadelphia, that produced nearly one thousand railroad engines between 1832 and 1866. It was the dominant American locomotive producer during most of that period and the first major exporter of American locomotives, selling its popular 4-2-0 engines to railways in Europe and building the first locomotive used in South America.

== History ==
=== Origin ===
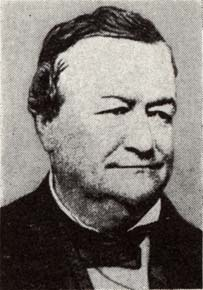
William Norris, founder of Norris Locomotive Works

The company was started in 1832 as the American Steam Carriage Company by William Norris (1802–1867) and Major Stephen H. Long (1784–1864), a military topographical engineer and explorer. The two men had experimented with steam engine building for years and, as early as 1829, designed a locomotive to burn anthracite coal. Norris and Long also built an engine called the Black Hawk, which performed with partial success on the Boston and Providence Railroad and the Philadelphia and Columbia Railroad in the early 1830s. Long later left the firm and William Norris was joined by his brother Septimus, who patented several locomotive-related inventions. The two brothers reformed the enterprise into the Norris Locomotive Works.

=== Growth and success ===
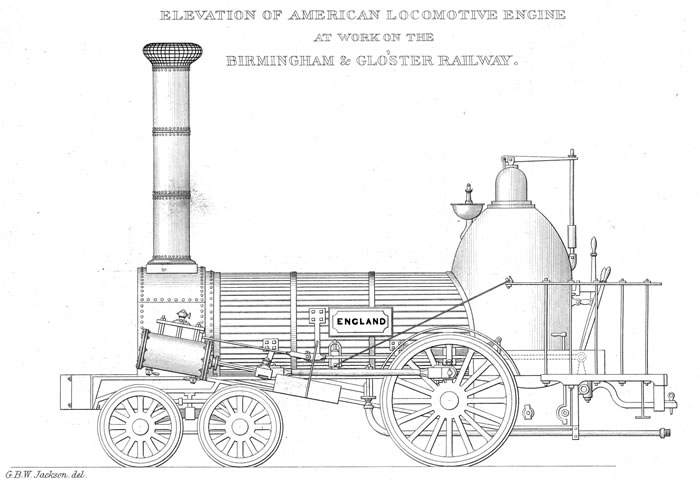
The England locomotive, built in America for the British Birmingham and Gloucester Railway

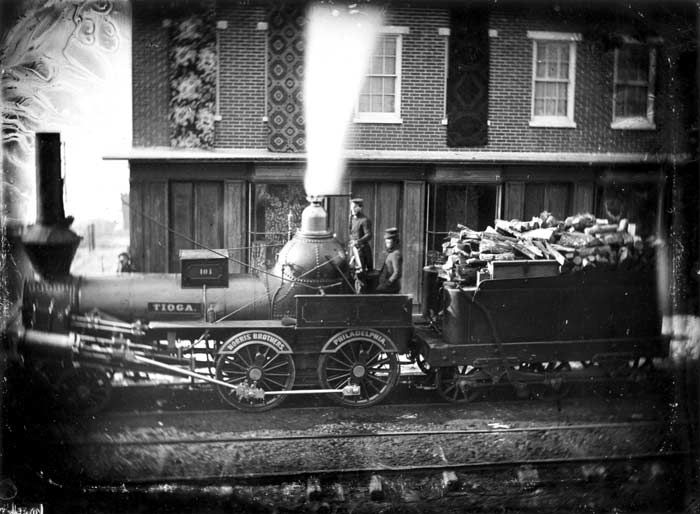
The Tioga leaving the Norris Works in 1848

One of the most historic events in railroading history occurred on July 10, 1836, when the Norris Brothers ran a test of a 4-2-0 locomotive on the Belmont Inclined Plane of the Philadelphia and Columbia Railroad The two-track incline ran from the Schuylkill River for 2,805 ft (0.855 km) towards present-day Belmont Avenue, rising one foot in 15 for a total of 187 ft (57 m). Named George Washington, the 14,400 lb (6,500 kg) engine hauled a load of 19,200 lb (8,700 kg), including 24 people riding on the tender and a freight car up the grade at 15 mph (24 km/h). This engine, the first in the world to ascend a hill by its own power, proved that a steam locomotive could climb a grade while pulling a load. So notable was this accomplishment that reports published in engineering journals emphatically doubted its occurrence. A second, more formal trial with an even greater load proved the engine's capabilities on July 19, 1836. Norris 4-2-0s were exported to England for the Lickey Incline about 1842, English manufacturers having declined to supply.

Norris built the Lafayette for the Baltimore and Ohio Railroad the following year based on plans of the George Washington. Named after the American Revolutionary War hero Marquis de Lafayette, this new 4-2-0 engine was the B&O's first locomotive to feature a leading truck and may have been the first standardized production model locomotive in the entire world. Innovations included positioning of cylinders outside and adjacent to the smokebox with pistons connecting to the face of the drive wheels instead of a crank axle, the four-wheel swiveling pilot truck, inside bar frame support, and placement of the two drivers ahead of the firebox (this supposedly offered greater power output as more of the locomotive's weight rested on the drivers and therefore increased tractive effort). The Lafayette established the configuration that American steam locomotives would follow until the end of the steam era.

In 1847, the Norris Works built the first ten-wheel locomotive in America: the Chesapeake. Operated by the Philadelphia and Reading Railroad, this was also the world's first 4-6-0 locomotive. It weighed 22 short tons (20.0 t; 19.6 long tons) and had 14.5 in × 22 in (370 mm × 560 mm) cylinders and 46 in (1,168 mm) diameter driving wheels. Initially a wood-burning locomotive, the Chesapeake was converted to burn anthracite coal in 1862, and ran for about another fifteen years. Some authorities claim that Septimus Norris came up with the design, but other sources attribute it to master builder John Brandt of the Erie Railway.

There were nine Norris brothers altogether, six of them had been involved in locomotive building at some point. William Norris' enterprise was renamed Norris Brothers when brothers Richard and Octavius joined it in 1844 during a period of financial distress and reorganization that included William's gradual departure from the business. The firm later became Richard Norris and Son. Other locomotive factories, operated independently (and unsuccessfully) by various Norris brothers later opened in Lancaster, Pennsylvania, and Schenectady, New York.

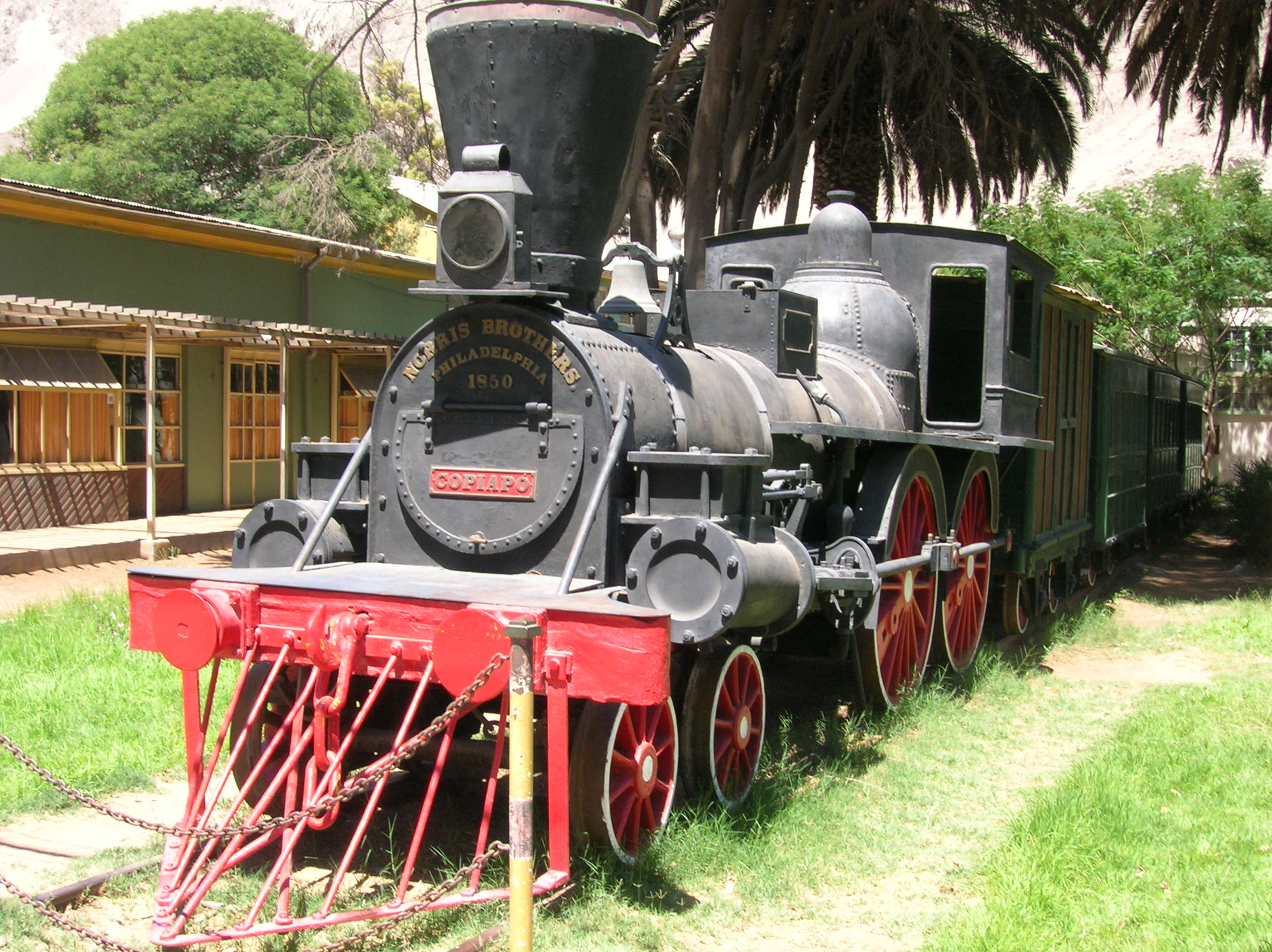
La Copiapó, the first locomotive in South America, was built by Norris in 1850

The Norris Locomotive Works sold many locomotives overseas, as noted above. This company was the first American exporter of locomotives—and perhaps of large mechanical devices generally. As early as 1840, thirty percent of the firm's production until then had been for foreign markets. Norris machines operated in England, France, the states of the German Confederation (including Prussia, Austria and Saxony), Belgium, Italy, Canada, Cuba and South America (The Copiapó, built in 1850 for Chilean Railroad, was the first locomotive in all of South America). These engines influenced contemporary and subsequent locomotive design in many of these countries.

William Norris had several large-scale operating models constructed as presentation pieces to rulers of several nations. Such sovereigns included Tsar Nicholas I of Russia and King Louis Philippe I of France, who was so pleased with his model that he gave Norris a gold medal and a gold box. A quarter-sized 4-4-0 locomotive and tender were built for Commodore Matthew C. Perry to deliver as a gift on his second expedition to Japan in 1854. A small circular railway - which also included a miniature passenger car made by another manufacturer and a mile of track — was set up near Yokohama, making it the first railway built in the Far East.

=== Demise ===
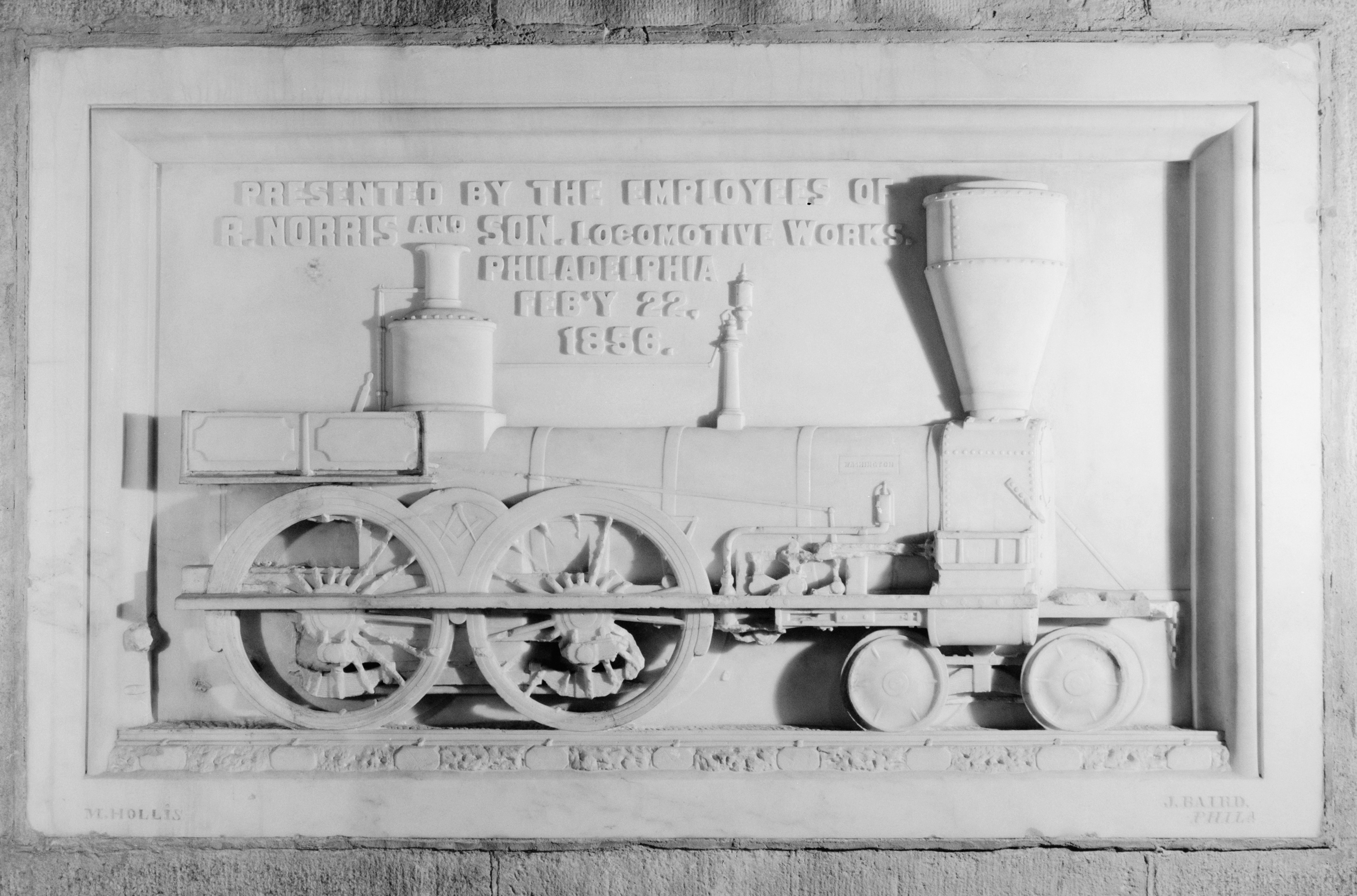
A commemorative stone in the Washington Monument presented by employees of the Norris Locomotive Works on February 22, 1856, George Washington's birthday; The 4-4-0 locomotive depicted bears the name Washington on its nameplate.

Richard Norris and Son was the largest locomotive maker in the United States, if not the world, during the 1850s. Employing many hundreds of men, the factory consisted of some ten buildings spread over several city blocks at what is now the campus of the Community College of Philadelphia. The firm reached its peak in 1857–58, after which time, the Norris family seems to have lost interest in the business. Manufacturing quality and output fell during the Civil War and the plant closed in 1866, although deliveries continued for a year or two.

The firm's factory complex was located in the area around 17th and Hamilton Streets in Philadelphia, Pennsylvania, on several acres of what had once been the famous Bush Hill estate of Andrew Hamilton, used as a hospital during the 1793 Philadelphia yellow fever epidemic. The site was near the right-of-way of the Philadelphia and Columbia Railroad, which crossed through Philadelphia just north of Callowhill Street. This route was later owned by the Reading Railroad.

The property lay idle until the adjacent Baldwin Locomotive Works, which had surpassed Norris as the largest locomotive builder in the U.S., acquired the site in 1873. The Norris buildings stood until 1896, when part of the property was cleared for construction of the third United States Mint in Philadelphia. Still standing, that building has been adapted as part of the Community College of Philadelphia. No trace of either the Norris or Baldwin factories remains in that part of Philadelphia.
