= Bar Mills, Maine =

- Village
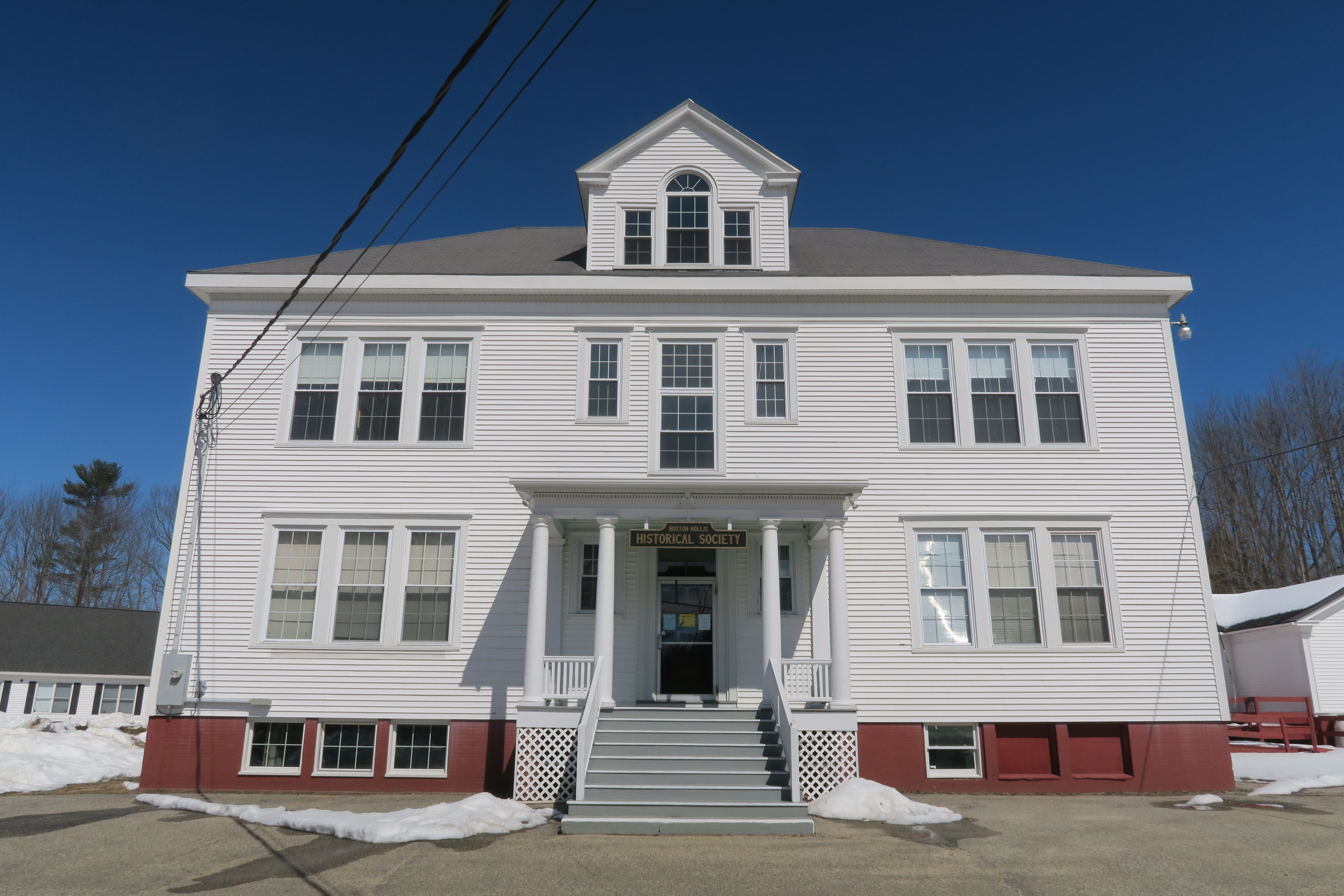
- Buxton Hollis Historical Society

- Location within Maine Location within the United States
- Coordinates: 43°36′47″N 70°32′59″W
- Country: United States
- State: Maine
- County: York
- Town: Buxton
- Elevation: 144 ft (44 m)
- Time zone: UTC-5 (Eastern (EST))
  - Summer (DST): UTC-4 (EDT)
- ZIP Code: 04004
- Area code: 207
- GNIS feature ID: 561589

Bar Mills is an unincorporated village in the town of Buxton, York County, Maine, United States. The community is located along the Saco River at the junction of state routes 4A and 112. Bar Mills has a post office with ZIP code 04004.
