= Portland, Saco and Portsmouth Railroad =

Map

The Portland, Saco and Portsmouth Railroad (PS&P) was a railroad in Maine that ran from Portland via Saco to South Berwick.

== History ==
It began operations in 1842. In 1843, an agreement was made between the Boston and Maine Railroad and the Eastern Railroad to share the railroad for their respective train services between Portland and Boston. In 1872, the PS&P was bought by the Eastern Railroad, and in 1884, the Boston & Maine took over the Eastern Railroad, including the PS&P, operating it as its Eastern Division.

In the 2000s, portions of the PS&P were converted to a rail trail known as the Eastern Trail.
