= Atlantic Shore Line Railway =

Electric trolley line in Maine

- Company type: Transportation
- Industry: Interurban
- Predecessor: Mousam River Railroad. Sanford and Cape Porpoise Railway. Portsmouth Kittery and York Street Railway. Portsmouth, Dover and York Street Railway.
- Founded: February 9, 1900; 126 years ago

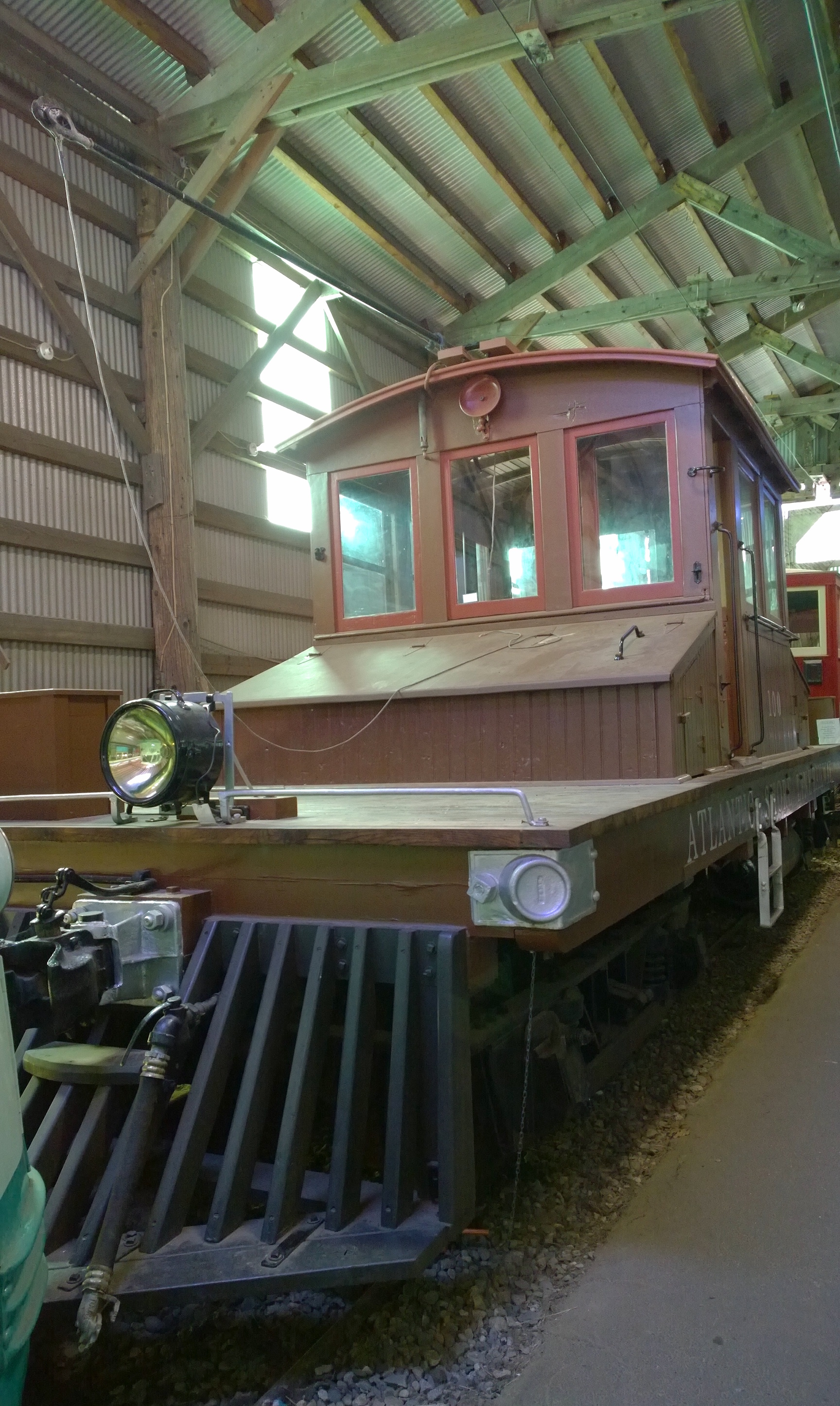
Atlantic Shore Line locomotive 100 is preserved at the Seashore Trolley Museum.

The Atlantic Shore Line (ASL) was an electric trolley line providing passenger and freight service to many towns in York County, Maine, in the United States. The ASL was the second-longest trolley line in Maine, encompassing over 87 miles (140 km) of track.

== Beginnings ==
A charter for the Atlantic Shore Line Electric Railroad was first issued in March 1893 by the Maine legislature. The charter allowed for the building of an electric railroad from Biddeford, through the towns of Kennebunkport and Wells, to York Beach. In October 1899, articles of association were filed for the Atlantic Shore Line Railway by a group which included officers of the Mousam River Railroad and the Sanford & Cape Porpoise Railway. The charter of the railroad was approved on February 9, 1900, following a hearing at the State House in Augusta.

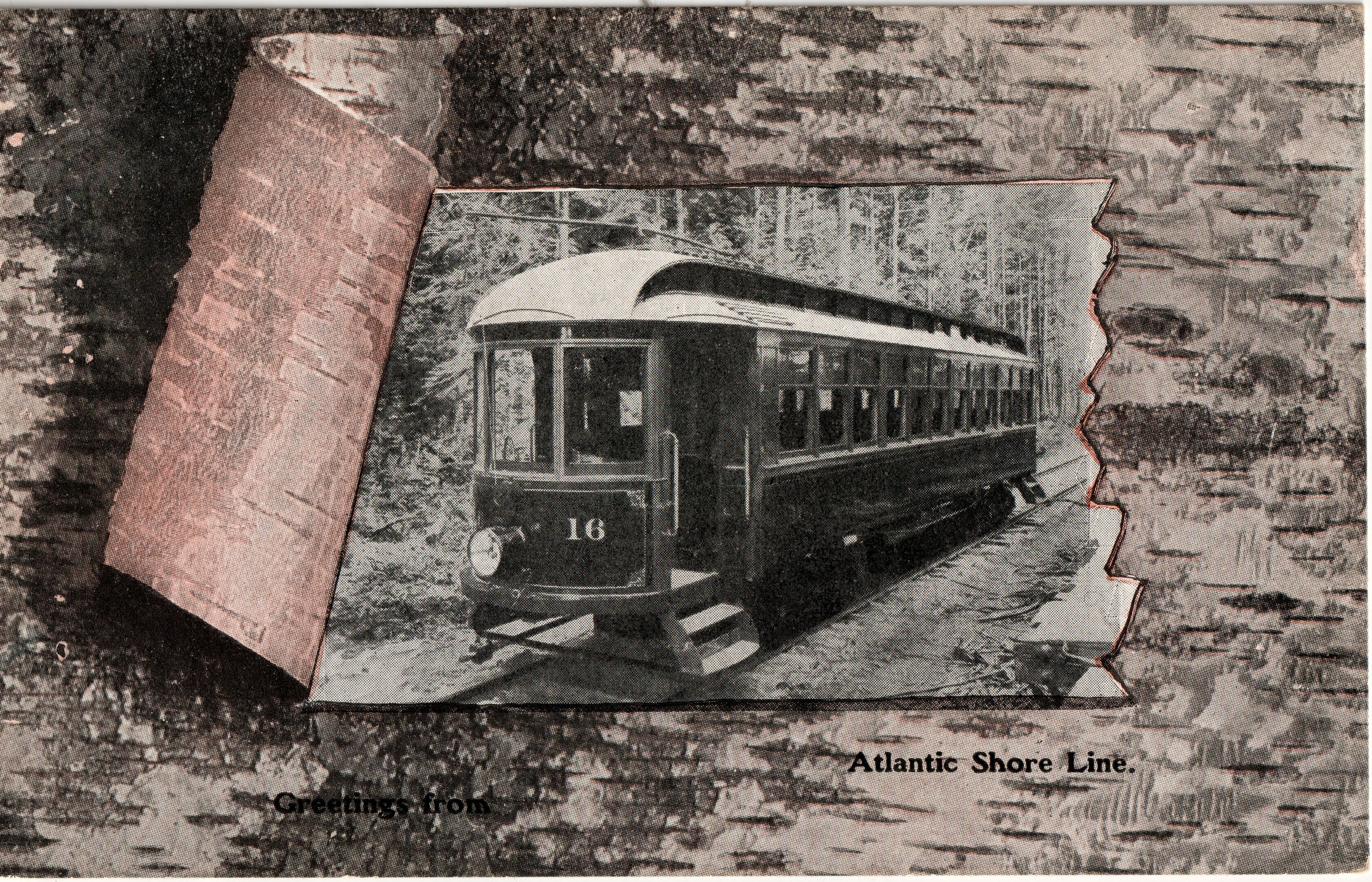
Locomotive 16 of the Atlantic Shore Line in service

== Route ==
From the Town House Square carbarn in Kennebunkport (the site currently across the street from the Kennebunkport Historical Society), ASL trolley service connected Cape Porpoise, Kennebunkport, Biddeford, Kennebunk, Alfred, Sanford, Springvale, Wells, Ogunquit, York, York Beach, Kittery, Eliot and South Berwick. The line also connected with Dover, New Hampshire, through South Berwick and with Portsmouth, New Hampshire, via ferry service from Kittery (the ASL ferry "Kittery" was built in Kennebunkport in 1900).

Electricity was provided from a power plant at Kittery Point, which was originally built by the Sanford Power Company.

== Operations ==
Electric freight service continued until June 1949, when a small diesel locomotive replaced the electric locomotives.

In 1939 the Seashore Electric Railway was formed with the intent to preserve electric cars for future operation.

4 miles (6 km) of the ASL right-of-way between Town House Square and Biddeford off Log Cabin Road in Kennebunkport have been preserved by the Seashore Trolley Museum. The museum has developed its demonstration railway upon 2 miles (3 km) of the old right of way. The museum has also completed the restoration of electric locomotive ASL #100, the only remaining original piece of rolling stock from the Atlantic Shore Line Railway system.
