= Maine Central diesel locomotives =

Maine Central Railroad began operating diesel locomotives in 1935, and had retired all steam locomotives by 1954. That time interval was a joint operating period with the Boston and Maine Railroad (B&M). This article describes diesel locomotives owned by Maine Central through the period of joint operation and later independent operation prior to Guilford Rail System control in 1981.

== Locomotive purchasing history ==
Maine Central made annual purchases of new steam locomotives from 1899 through 1920. Changing economic climate following World War I terminated routine annual purchases. Economic restructuring in the early 1920s included purchasing a few modern steam locomotives in 1923 and 1924 while eliminating subsidiary branch lines serving Bridgton, Belfast and Franklin County. J. G. Brill Company 68 horsepower (51 kW) Model 55 gasoline-powered baggage-mail motor car number 700 was purchased in 1922 and scrapped in 1930. Attempts to offer passenger service enticing people off Maine roads included the purchase of the last two new steam locomotives in 1930 followed by joint purchase of the Budd Company Flying Yankee streamliner in 1935. Two gasoline-powered switchers were purchased while exploring options to decrease operating costs through the Great Depression. Maine Central number 1 was Whitcomb Locomotive Works builders number 12981 built in 1929, acquired in 1932 and sold to National Fireworks Company in 1941. Number 2 was Plymouth Locomotive Works builders number 3957 built in 1938 and sold to New England Shipbuilding Corporation in 1942.

Maine Central's first wholly owned diesel-electric locomotive was an Ingersoll Rand 600 horsepower (450 kW) railcar built as demonstrator OE-600 in 1933. The rear of the railcar included the railway post office and baggage compartments. The railcar became Maine Central number 901 in 1935; and pulled a coach or two over the eastern division between Bangor, Maine and Vanceboro, Maine until 1947. It then spent two years pulling Rumford Branch passenger trains before conversion to unpowered maintenance of way tool car number 950.

Builder	Type	Class	Notes
ALCO	HH660	DS-2	
ALCO	RS-2	DRS-1b	
ALCO	RS-3	DRS-1d	
ALCO	RS-11	DRS-1f	
ALCO	S-1	DS-3	
ALCO	S-2	DS-4b	
ALCO	S-3	DS-3	
ALCO	S-4	DS-4d	
EMD	E7A	DP	
EMD	F3A/B	DF-3	steam generator
EMD	F3A	DF-4	
EMD	GP7	DRS-3	class DRS-3a = MU & dynamic brakes class DRS-3b = MU & steam generator class DRS-3d = steam generator
EMD	GP38	DRS-4	
EMD	SW7	DS-5	
EMD	SW9	DS-5	
GE	44-ton switcher	DS-1	
GE	U18B	Independence	
GE	U25B		

== Paint schemes ==
Diesel locomotives were painted black with white lettering through World War II. Road engines built through the period of joint operation shared the B&M paint scheme of maroon with gold stripes first applied to B&M EMD FTs. Only the Maine Central lettering and herald were different. Maine Central followed B&M practice of applying horizontal red stripes outlined in white across the nose of black ALCO and General Electric switchers after B&M purchased ALCO RS-2 demonstrator number 1500 wearing that paint scheme in May, 1948.

The period of joint operations ended in 1953 when Maine Central established separate corporate headquarters in Portland, Maine, and modified the road engine paint scheme by retaining the gold stripe pattern while substituting forest green for the B&M maroon background color. Only two ALCO RS-3s, two ALCO RS-11s, a single EMD SW9 and the last four EMD GP7s were delivered wearing green and gold, but several road switchers and most of the EMD E7s and F3s were later repainted in that scheme. ALCO S-4s delivered in 1954 were painted in a simplified green paint scheme with yellow lettering and fewer stripes. Most of the ALCO road switchers, S-4 number 313, S-1s 954 and 958, 44-ton switcher 11, and GP7s 564, 566, 569 and 571 were later repainted in the less complex green scheme.

EMD GP38s replacing older cab units in 1966 introduced new safety yellow paint schemes. The GP38s were painted yellow with green lettering. Similar yellow paint schemes were applied to all subsequent road switcher purchases until Guilford control. Most of the GP7s were similarly repainted beginning in 1972. RS-11s 801 and 802 were painted yellow in 1977 and 1981, respectively. Yellow paint covered the formerly striped noses of many ALCO switchers, although cabs and hoods remained black.

== Class DS yard switchers ==
Maine Central purchased two ALCO HH series locomotives in 1939 after observing operation of earlier purchases of these switchers by subsidiary Portland Terminal Company. Ten similar ALCO S-1 and S-3s were purchased by 1953. These switchers worked in the larger yards and replaced 4-6-0s on the Harmony branch. Maine Central also purchased seven GE 44-ton switchers between 1941 and 1947 for use in Augusta, Brunswick, Livermore Falls, Vanceboro, Eastport, and the unconnected upper and lower yards at Lewiston. The Brunswick assignment proved too heavy for a 44-ton switcher; but they eliminated need for firemen and 0-6-0 maintenance crews in the remaining locations. The 660 horsepower (490 kW) ALCO switchers served as summer replacements when the 44-ton switchers required maintenance; but the ALCOs lacked electric hood heaters which allowed the 44-ton switchers to sleep in unheated engine houses through winter months without freezing the engine blocks. ALCOs replaced 44-ton switchers at some locations in the mid 1970s; but light rail on the Eastport branch required a 44-ton switcher until service to Eastport was discontinued in 1978.

Number	Class	Type	Works number	Built	Retired	Notes
11	DS-1	GE 44-ton	13095	9/1941	3/1974	only GE switcher painted green; sold
12	DS-1	GE 44-ton	15037	8/1942	9/1975	sold
13	DS-1	GE 44-ton	27973	5/1945	3/1974	sold
14	DS-1	GE 44-ton	27974	5/1945	12/1977	sold
15	DS-1	GE 44-ton	27975	5/1945	12/1974	sold as Conway Scenic Railroad # 15
16	DS-1	GE 44-ton	28488	5/1946	1985	sold as Aroostook Valley Railroad # 14
17	DS-1	GE 44-ton	28348	5/1947	4/1974	sold
951	DS-2	HH660	69087	9/1939	3/1967	scrapped
952	DS-2	HH660	69088	9/1939	2/1968	scrapped
953	DS-3	S-1	69411	1/1941	1975	traded for U18B
954	DS-3	S-1	73085	1/1945	1975	traded for U18B
955	DS-3	S-1	73589	10/1945	1975	traded for U18B
956	DS-3	S-1	75350	7/1947	1975	traded for U18B
957	DS-3	S-1	77107	10/1949	1982	
958	DS-3	S-1	77108	10/1949	1982	
959	DS-3	S-1	77109	10/1949	1975	traded for U18B; became North Stratford Railroad # 959
960	DS-3	S-1	77110	10/1949	1982	
961	DS-3	S-3	80290	3/1953	1975	traded for U18B
962	DS-3	S-3	80291	3/1953	4/1981	

== Class DP (EMD E7A) ==
Maine Central purchased seven EMD E7s in 1946 and 1948 to operate in a power pool with B&M E7s for passenger service between B&M points south of Portland and Maine Central points north of Portland. The first four were part of a cancelled order for the Rock Island Railroad; and operated for a few months wearing a Rock Island paint scheme with Maine Central lettering. Maine Central soon repainted the Rock Island E7s to match the B&M paint scheme with Maine Central lettering. Two of the E7s were scrapped when Maine Central terminated passenger service in 1960. The remaining five pulled mail and express trains on the former Gull schedule. They were sold to the Kansas City Southern Railroad (KCS) when the Gull express service ended in 1963.

Number	Works number	Built	Retired	Notes
705	3366	6/1946	10/1963	Rock Island paint; sold as KCS # 6
706	3367	6/1946	10/1963	Rock Island paint; sold as KCS # 7
707	3368	6/1946	10/1963	Rock Island paint; sold as KCS # 11
708	3369	6/1946	10/1963	Rock Island paint; sold as KCS # 12
709	6647	7/1948	9/1962	sold as KCS # 20
710	6648	7/1948	9/1960	scrapped
711	6649	7/1948	12/1960	scrapped

== Class DF (EMD F3) ==
In 1947 and 1948, Maine Central purchased eight EMD F3As and two F3Bs as their first diesel freight locomotives. Class DF-3 were built with "chicken wire" grills and steam generators for possible use on passenger trains; but all Maine Central F3s spent most of their lives pulling freight trains on the main line and Mountain Division. Class DF-4 had the EMD F7-style grills and were sometimes called F5s. The F3s were traded in for EMD GP38s in 1966.

Number	Class	Type	Works number	Built	Retired	Notes
671A	DF-3	F3A	4494	12/1947	12/66	traded for GP38
671B	DF-3	F3B	4496	12/1947	11/66	traded for GP38
672A	DF-3	F3A	4495	12/1947	12/66	traded for GP38
672B	DF-3	F3B	4497	12/1947	11/66	traded for GP38
681	DF-4	F3A	5695	11/1948	12/66	traded for GP38
682	DF-4	F3A	5696	11/1948	12/66	traded for GP38
683	DF-4	F3A	5697	11/1948	11/66	traded for GP38
684	DF-4	F3A	5698	11/1948	12/66	traded for GP38
685	DF-4	F3A	5699	11/1948	7/66	traded for GP38
686	DF-4	F3A	5700	11/1948	11/65	wrecked and scrapped

== Class DS branch line switchers ==
Maine Central purchased three ALCO S-2s in 1949 to handle heavy cuts of freight cars in the Bangor and Waterville yards similar to the work Portland Terminal Company S2s were doing in the Rigby Yard at the southern end of the Maine Central main line. Class DS-4b S-2s also worked in Rockland and Rumford. Class DS-4d were similar but equipped for multiple-unit (MU) operation to pull branch line freight trains. Four S-4s delivered in 1954 were the only green Maine Central ALCO switchers until numbers 313, 954 and 958 were similarly repainted.

Three maroon and gold MU-equipped EMD SW7s and an SW-9 were purchased in 1950 and 1951, and a similar green and gold SW9 purchased in 1953 became Maine Central class DS-5. These EMD switchers worked as helpers and local freight engines on the Mountain Division until 1958. They then handled local freights out of Portland until being assigned to Bangor in 1966 for Bucksport Branch freight trains.

Number	Class	Type	Works number	Built	Retired	Notes
301	DS-4b	S-2	76593	2/1949	7/1978	
302	DS-4b	S-2	76594	2/1949	1980	
303	DS-4b	S-2	76595	2/1949	1980	
311	DS-4d	S-4	78008	8/1950	1980	the first S-4 type built by ALCO; MU cab end only; sold to Orrington, Maine chemical plant
312	DS-4d	S-4	78020	8/1950	1980	MU cab end only
313	DS-4d	S-4	79502	12/1951	1981	
314	DS-4d	S-4	81096	9/1954	1981	
315	DS-4d	S-4	81097	9/1954	1980	
316	DS-4d	S-4	81098	9/1954	1980	
317	DS-4d	S-4	81099	9/1954	1981	
331	DS-5	SW7	12370	9/1950		
332	DS-5	SW7	12371	9/1950		
333	DS-5	SW7	12372	9/1950		
334	DS-5	SW9	14754	8/1951		
335	DS-5	SW9	19044	12/1953		

== Class DRS road switchers ==
Purchase of maroon and gold road switchers began with five ALCO RS-2s in 1949. Maine Central then purchased five class DRS-3b EMD GP7s with dynamic brakes for freight service, and ten class DRS-3b with steam generators for passenger service. In 1953 Maine Central purchased four green and gold GP7s with dynamic brakes and two green and gold ALCO RS-3s with steam generators. All steam locomotives were retired by 1954, but Maine Central purchased two green and gold ALCO RS-11s in 1956 to meet operational requirements after experience demonstrated diesel locomotive maintenance needs and availability. A class DRS-3d maroon and gold GP7 with steam generator but no MU equipment was acquired in 1957. Portland Terminal Company had been using the GP7 as a mileage equalizer pulling commuter trains out of North Station until replaced by Budd Rail Diesel Cars.

After some experimentation in other locations, the ALCO road switchers were based at Bangor and usually worked on the eastern division between Bangor and the New Brunswick border. Steam generators were removed from most of the EMD GP7s as their assignments became increasingly focused on freight trains west of Bangor. Steam generators were retained on GP7s 571 through 574 after regularly scheduled passenger service ended in 1960. Through the 1960s these four GP7s pulled extra trains of New Haven Railroad coaches carrying children to summer camps in Maine.

Three of the RS-2s were traded in for GP38s in 1966. GP7s started working on the eastern division when thirteen new GP38s were delivered in 1966 and 1967. GP7s replaced remaining ALCO RS-2s and RS-3s when ten new GE U18Bs arrived in 1975. The U18Bs were individually named after Maine personalities and places of the American Revolutionary War in recognition of the United States Bicentennial. Maine Central was one of two railroads in America to purchase the U18B. The U18Bs were noted for having reliability issues and being underpowered.

After the bicentennial, Maine Central began purchasing used locomotives including fourteen GE U25Bs from the liquidated Rock Island Railroad. Five of the U25Bs were cannibalized for parts to make the remaining nine operational. Availability of nine U25Bs for freight service allowed GP7s to replace the remaining ALCO switchers for yard assignments.

Number	Class	Type	Works number	Built	Retired	Notes
225		U25B	35701	9/1965		former Rock Island # 225 purchased 6/1980
226		U25B	35702	9/1965		former Rock Island # 226 purchased 6/1980
228		U25B	35704	9/1965		former Rock Island # 228 purchased 6/1980
229		U25B	35705	9/1965		former Rock Island # 229 purchased 6/1980
230		U25B	35706	9/1965		former Rock Island # 230 purchased 6/1980
231		U25B	35707	9/1965	1/1987	former Rock Island # 231 purchased 6/1980; wrecked
232		U25B	35708	9/1965		former Rock Island # 232 purchased 6/1980
234		U25B	35710	9/1965		former Rock Island # 234 purchased 6/1980
238		U25B	35714	9/1965		former Rock Island # 238 purchased 6/1980
251	DRS-4	GP38	32660	11/1966		
252	DRS-4	GP38	32661	11/1966		
253	DRS-4	GP38	32662	11/1966		
254	DRS-4	GP38	32663	11/1966		
255	DRS-4	GP38	32664	11/1966		
256	DRS-4	GP38	32665	11/1966		
257	DRS-4	GP38	32666	11/1966		
258	DRS-4	GP38	32667	11/1966		
259	DRS-4	GP38	32668	11/1966		
260	DRS-4	GP38	32669	11/1966		
261	DRS-4	GP38	32670	11/1966		
262	DRS-4	GP38	32671	11/1966		
263	DRS-4	GP38	33280	9/1967		
400	Independence	U18B	40720	5/1975		named General Henry Knox
401	Independence	U18B	40721	5/1975		named Hannah Weston, who carried gunpowder to Jeremiah O'Brien's forces at Machias, Maine
402	Independence	U18B	40722	5/1975		named General John Stark
403	Independence	U18B	40723	5/1975		named General Peleg Wadsworth
404	Independence	U18B	40724	5/1975		named Kenneth Roberts
405	Independence	U18B	40725	6/1975		named Arundel, the historical novel written by Kenneth Roberts
406	Independence	U18B	40726	6/1975		named Colonel John Allen, who dissuaded Abnaki from assisting loyalists
407	Independence	U18B	40727	6/1975		named Unity, the sloop commanded by Jeremiah O'Brien.
408	Independence	U18B	40728	6/1975		named Battle of the Bagaduce
409	Independence	U18B	40729	6/1975		named Ethan Allen
450		EMD GP9	A2018	8/1963		the last GP9 built; former Algoma Central Railway # 171 purchased 6/1981
469		RS-3	78291	9/1950	6/1967	former RI # 469 purchased 11/1965; relettered but not repainted; traded for GP38 # 263
551	DRS-1b	RS-2	76634	1/1949	11/1966	traded for GP38
552	DRS-1b	RS-2	76635	1/1949	12/1966	traded for GP38
553	DRS-1b	RS-2	76636	1/1949	1975	sold as Providence and Worcester Railroad # 1501
554	DRS-1b	RS-2	76637	2/1949	1977	repainted with unique yellow cab and green hoods; scrapped
555	DRS-1b	RS-2	76638	2/1949	12/1966	traded for GP38
556	DRS-1d	RS-3	80566	11/1953	4/1975	scrapped
557	DRS-1d	RS-3	80567	11/1953	4/1975	sold as Wolfeboro Railroad # 101
561	DRS-3a	GP7	12362	10/1950		
562	DRS-3a	GP7	12363	10/1950		
563	DRS-3a	GP7	12364	10/1950		
564	DRS-3a	GP7	12365	10/1950		renumbered # 470 in 12/1982
565	DRS-3a	GP7	12366	10/1950		
566	DRS-3a	GP7	19041	11/1953		
567	DRS-3a	GP7	19042	11/1953		
568	DRS-3a	GP7	19302	12/1953		
569	DRS-3a	GP7	19303	12/1953		
571	DRS-3b	GP7	12367	9/1950		rebuilt with crew cab in 12/1985 as # 471
572	DRS-3b	GP7	12368	9/1950		repainted in original maroon and gold scheme in 12/1978
573	DRS-3b	GP7	12369	9/1950		repainted in unique simplified green paint scheme in 1963, and again in 1977 with another unique green paint scheme with silver trucks as Maine Central's last steam-generator-equipped locomotive; repainted in original maroon and gold following a wreck in 1981.
574	DRS-3b	GP7	14755	10/1951		repainted green and gold in 1963; rebuilt with chopped nose and painted yellow in 8/1972
575	DRS-3b	GP7	17416	10/1952		
576	DRS-3b	GP7	17417	10/1952		
577	DRS-3b	GP7	17418	10/1952		
578	DRS-3b	GP7	17419	10/1952		rebuilt with chopped nose and painted yellow in 1/1972
579	DRS-3b	GP7	17420	10/1952		rebuilt with chopped nose and painted yellow in 10/1980
580	DRS-3b	GP7	17421	10/1952		became the last GP7 wearing original maroon paint in 1980
581	DRS-3d	GP7	13533	12/1950		former Portland Terminal Company # 1081 acquired 3/1957
590		GP7	17770	2/1953		former Louisville and Nashville Railroad (L&N) # 439 purchased 12/1978 and rebuilt with chopped nose in 9/1979
591		GP7	17764	2/1953		former L&N # 433 purchased 12/1978 and rebuilt with chopped nose in 1/1980
592		GP7	8872	3/1950		former L&N # 388 purchased 12/1978 and rebuilt with chopped nose in 12/1980
593		GP7	8878	12/1950		former L&N # 393 purchased 12/1978 and rebuilt with chopped nose in 7/1980
801	DRS-1f	RS-11	81616	6/1956		scrapped 1984
802	DRS-1f	RS-11	81617	6/1956		former Portland Terminal Company # 1082 acquired 11/1956
