= Maine Central Railroad main line =

Railway line in the United States of America

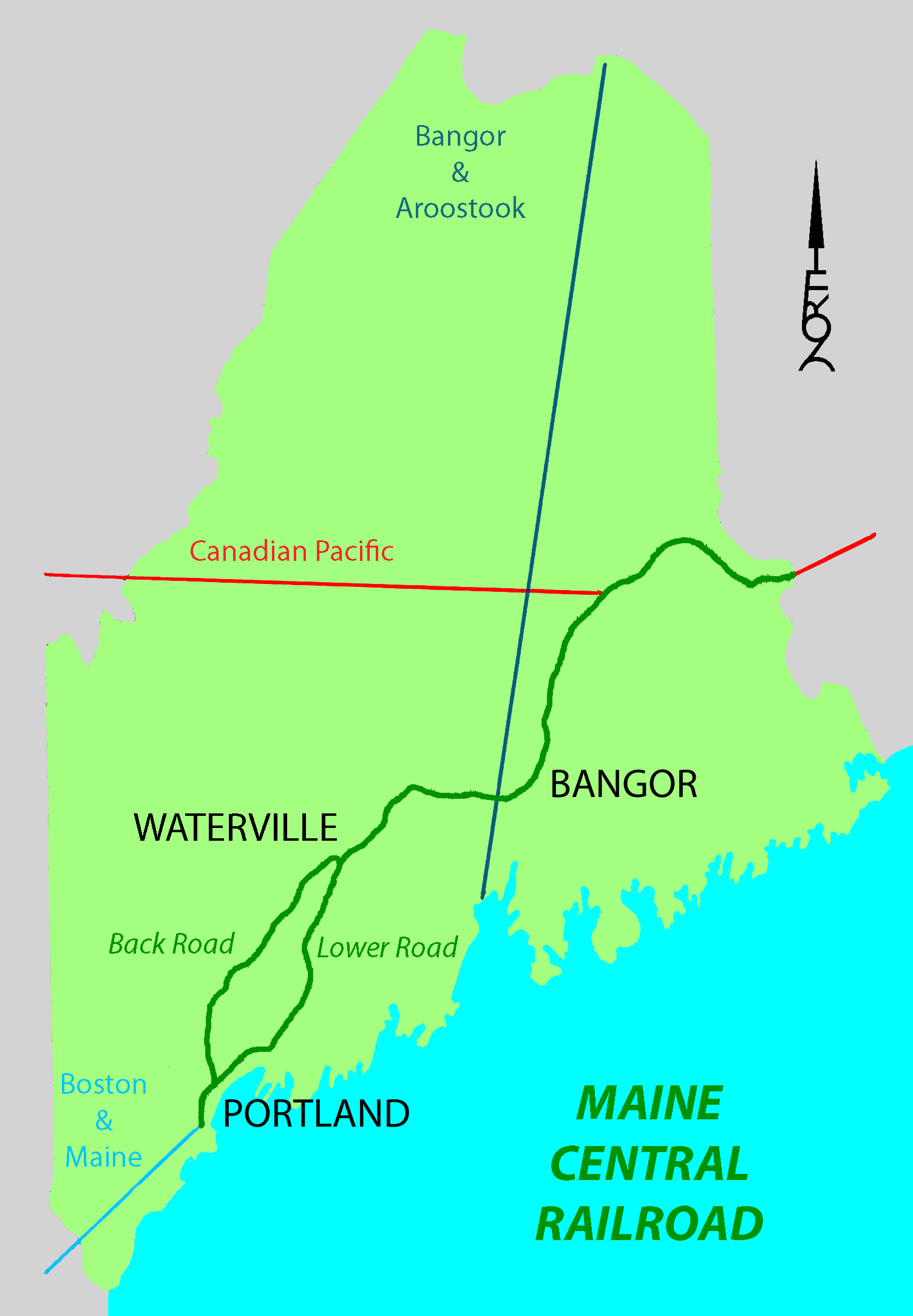
Maine Central Railroad main line in dark green.

The Maine Central Railroad Company main line extended from Portland, Maine, east to the Canada–US border with New Brunswick at the Saint Croix–Vanceboro Railway Bridge. It is the transportation artery linking Maine cities to the national railway network. Sections of the main line had been built by predecessor railroads consolidated as the Maine Central in 1862 and extended to the Canada–US border in 1882. Through the early 20th century, the main line was double track from South Portland to Royal Junction, where it split into a lower road through Brunswick and Augusta and a back road through Lewiston which converged at Waterville into single track to Bangor and points east. Westbound trains typically used the lower road with lighter grades, while eastbound trains of empty cars used the back road. This historical description does not include changes following purchase of the Maine Central Railroad by Guilford Transportation Industries in 1981 and subsequent operation as part of Pan Am Railways.

== Portland Terminal Company ==
Portland had been the terminal of several railroads whose independent yard facilities were consolidated as the Portland Terminal Company in 1911. After 1922, most freight trains originated or terminated in South Portland's Rigby Yard on what had originally been Boston and Maine Railroad (B&M) property.

- Milepost 0: Commercial Street Station had been established in 1842 as the northern terminal of the B&M predecessor Portland, Saco and Portsmouth Railway and became the southern terminal of the connecting standard gauge Kennebec and Portland Railroad.
- Milepost 1.6: Portland Union Station opened in 1888 and was used by main line passenger trains until razed in 1961. Union Station was the junction with the Portland and Ogdensburg Railway opened in 1870 and leased as the Maine Central Mountain Division in 1888.
- Milepost 3.0: Woodfords
- Milepost 4.1: Deering Junction with the former Worcester, Nashua and Rochester Railroad branch of the B&M.

== Kennebec and Portland Railroad ==
The Kennebec and Portland Railroad was chartered in 1836, and completed from Portland to Augusta in 1851. It was reorganized as the Portland and Kennebec Railroad in 1862, leased as the Maine Central lower road main line in 1870, and purchased in 1874.

- Presumpscot River bridge
- Milepost 7.9: West Falmouth station opened in 1850.
- Milepost 11.0: Cumberland Center station opened in 1850.
- Milepost 13.2: Royal Junction with the back road main line.
- Royal River bridge
- Milepost 15.0: Yarmouth Junction with the Grand Trunk Railway (later Canadian National Railway Berlin subdivision)
- Milepost 20.5: Freeport station opened in 1848.
- Milepost 29.2: Brunswick was the junction with the Maine Central Railroad Rockland Branch and Lewiston branch.
- Androscoggin River bridge
- Milepost 30.3: Topsham station opened in 1851.
- Milepost 36.9: Bowdoinham station opened in 1851.
- Milepost 44.5: Richmond station opened in 1851.
- Milepost 47.4: Iceboro station opened in 1851.
- Milepost 55.9: Gardiner was the junction with the 2-mile Maine Central Cobbosseecontee branch originally serving water-powered mills along the stream of the same name.
- Milepost 60.2: Hallowell station opened in 1851.
- Milepost 62.3: Augusta operated a Maine Central local switcher serving industries from Gardiner to Augusta.

== Somerset & Kennebec Railroad ==
The Somerset and Kennebec Railroad was chartered in 1848 and completed from Augusta to Waterville in 1853. It became the northern end of the lower road main line in 1874 after being leased to the Portland and Kennebec Railroad in 1864, and to the Maine Central in 1870.

- Kennebec River bridge
- Milepost 73.7: Vassalboro station opened in 1853.
- Milepost 80.1: Winslow station opened in 1853.
- Kennebec River bridge
- Milepost 81.7: Waterville, where the slightly longer back road main line MP 85.2 rejoined the lower road main line MP 81.7. Maine Central shops were located here, and this was the junction of an 18-mile branch to Skowhegan, which was the northern terminal of the Somerset & Kennebec.

== Penobscot & Kennebec Railroad ==
The Penobscot and Kennebec Railroad was chartered in 1845 and completed a Portland gauge line from Waterville to Bangor. It was leased as an eastern extension to the Portland gauge Androscoggin and Kennebec Railroad in 1856, and merged into Maine Central as the eastern end of the Portland Division main line in 1862.

- Kennebec River bridge
- Milepost 84.6: West Benton station opened in 1855.
- Milepost 90.2: Clinton station opened in 1855.
- Milepost 95.5: Burnham Junction with the Belfast and Moosehead Lake Railroad which was leased as the Maine Central Belfast branch from 1871 to 1925.
- Milepost 102.5: Pittsfield junction with the Sebasticook and Moosehead Railroad built in 1886 and leased as the Maine Central Harmony branch in 1910. Sebasticook River bridge
- Milepost 106.8: Detroit station opened in 1855.
- Milepost 109.6: Newport Junction with the Dexter and Newport Railroad built in 1868 and leased as the Maine Central Foxcroft branch in 1869. A large milk processing plant filled milk cars destined for Boston.
- Milepost 112.2: East Newport station opened in 1855.
- Milepost 118.0: Etna station opened in 1855.
- Milepost 121.9: Carmel station opened in 1855.
- Milepost 131.3: Northern Maine Junction interchange with the Bangor and Aroostook Railroad was completed in 1905. Potatoes grown in Aroostook County and paper manufactured in Millinocket and Madawaska contributed a significant proportion of freight carried by the Maine Central.
- Milepost 137.0: Bangor Union Station: Bangor was the division point between Maine Central's Portland and Eastern divisions, and junction with the Maine Central Railroad Bucksport Branch and Maine Central Railroad Calais Branch.

== European & North American Railway ==
The European and North American Railway was chartered in 1850, and opened from Bangor to Vanceboro in 1871. It was leased as the Maine Central Eastern Division main line in 1882, and purchased in 1955 for $125 per share or $3,114,500 payable in cash or bonds at the election of the E&NA shareholders.

- Milepost 140.8: Veazie station opened in 1869.
- Milepost 145.0: Orono station opened in 1869. Stillwater River bridge
- Milepost 145.3: Webster station opened in 1869.
- Milepost 149.2: Old Town station opened in 1869.
- Penobscot River bridge
- Milepost 150.0: Milford station opened in 1869.
- Milepost 159.6: Greenbush station opened in 1869.
- Milepost 167.4: Passadumkeag station opened in 1869.
- Milepost 172.0: Enfield junction with a 3.5-mile (5.6 km) branch to Howland from 1891 to 1963.
- Milepost 181.4: Lincoln station opened in 1869.
- Milepost 192.2: Winn station opened in 1869.
- Milepost 194.7: Mattawamkeag interchange with the International Railway of Maine, completed by the Canadian Pacific Railway in 1889 and operated as their International of Maine Division.
- Mattawamkeag River bridge

== Canadian Pacific Railway ==
Canadian Pacific's transcontinental route to Saint John, New Brunswick, included trackage rights over the (former European and North American Railway) Maine Central Eastern Division main line from Mattawamkeag to the Canada–US border. This section of the main line saw some of the heaviest traffic on any portion of the Maine Central during winter months before modern icebreakers were able to keep the Saint Lawrence Seaway open; and most of it was Canadian Pacific trains exercising trackage rights. Canadian Pacific purchased the line from Maine Central on December 17, 1974, for $5.4 million. Maine Central retained trackage rights and subsequently operated this portion of their former main line as the Vanceboro Branch.

- Milepost 202.9: Kingman station opened in 1871.
- Milepost 205.9: Drew station opened in 1871.
- Milepost 212.1: Wytopitlock station opened in 1871.
- Milepost 215.3: Bancroft station opened in 1871.
- Milepost 224.6: Danforth station opened in 1871.
- Milepost 250.7: Vanceboro junction with Canadian Pacific Railway transcontinental route through New Brunswick.

== Back Road alternate main line ==
Maine Central operated parallel main lines between Royal Junction and Waterville. The northerly inland main line was known as the back road, and the slightly shorter main line up the Kennebec River was the lower road. Maine Central mileposts east of Waterville computed mileage via the lower road. The line between Royal Junction and Danville Junction was built to provide a wholly owned route to Portland in place of the Grand Trunk Railway connection from Danville Junction originally used by the former Androscoggin and Kennebec Railroad. This was the only portion of the Maine Central main line built by the Maine Central rather than predecessor companies.

- Milepost 13.2: Royal Junction with the lower road main line.
- Milepost 21.2: Gray station opened in 1871.
- Milepost 25.8: New Gloucester station opened in 1871.

== Androscoggin & Kennebec Railroad ==
The Androscoggin and Kennebec Railroad was chartered in 1845 and completed a Portland gauge railroad from Danville Junction to Waterville in 1849. The line was merged into the Maine Central in 1862 and standard-gauged in 1871 to become the back road main line.

- Milepost 30.7: Danville Junction interchange with the Grand Trunk Railway (later Canadian National Railway Berlin subdivision)
- Milepost 32.9: Rumford Junction with the Portland and Rumford Falls Railway completed in 1894 and operated as the Maine Central Rangeley branch from 1907 to 1952.
- Little Androscoggin River bridge
- Milepost 36.2: Auburn station opened in 1848.
- Androscoggin River bridge
- Milepost 37.0: Lewiston upper station opened in 1848. Lewiston operated a Maine Central local switcher serving local distribution warehouses, textile mills, and shoe manufacturing plants.
- Milepost 44.5: Greene station opened in 1849.
- Milepost 47.6: Leeds Junction with the Portland gauge Androscoggin Railroad completed to West Farmington in 1859 and converted to standard gauge in 1861. It operated as the Maine Central Farmington branch from 1871 and was later called the Maine Central Rumford Branch.
- Milepost 51.0: Monmouth station opened in 1849.
- Milepost 56.6: Winthrop station opened in 1849.
- Milepost 62.3: Readfield station opened in 1849.
- Milepost 70.2: Belgrade station opened in 1849.
- Milepost 79.2: Oakland junction with the Somerset Railroad opened in 1875 and operated as the Maine Central Kineo branch after 1911.
- Milepost 85.2: Waterville, where the back road rejoined the lower road.
