= Machias station =

- Machias Railroad Station
- U.S. National Register of Historic Places
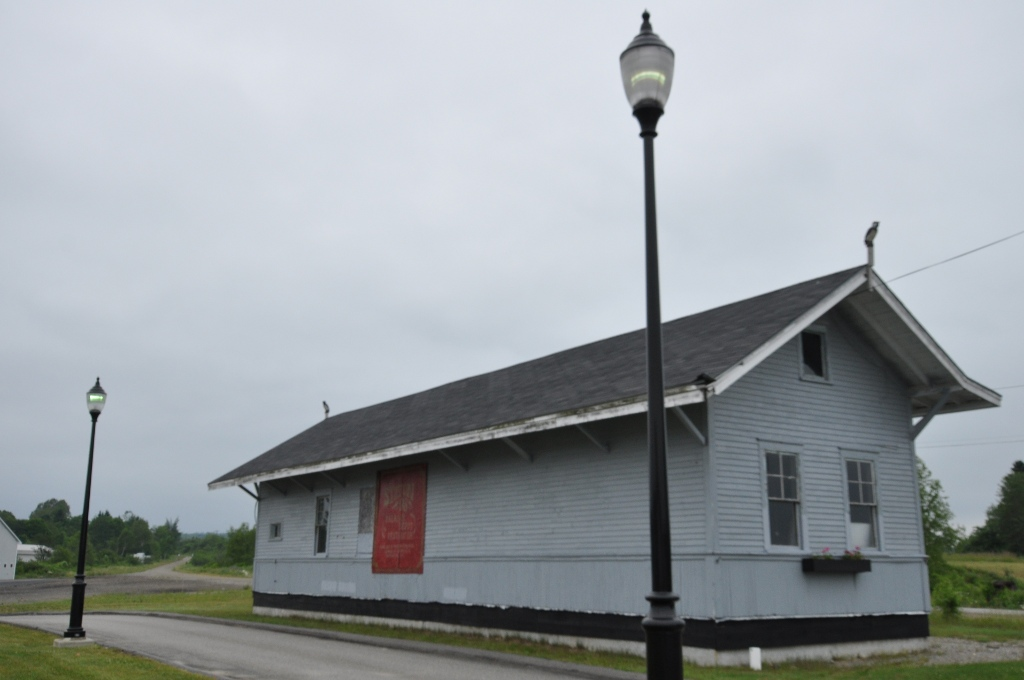

- Location within Maine Location within the United States
- Location: 27 East Main Street, Machias, Maine
- Coordinates: 44°43′10″N 67°27′8″W
- Area: less than one acre
- Built: 1898
- Architect: Varney, Howard
- Architectural style: Washington County RR Station
- NRHP reference No.: 92001293
- Added to NRHP: October 2, 1992

The Machias Railroad Station is a historic railroad station near the junction of Court and Main Streets (US Routes 1A and 1, respectively) in Machias, Maine. Built in 1898, it is one of five surviving stations built by the ambitious but unsuccessful Washington County Railroad. It was added to the National Register of Historic Places on October 2, 1992. The station was restored in 2015 for use as a visitor center and community meeting space.

== Description and history ==
The former Machias railroad station stands on the north side of United States Route 1, at the eastern fringe of its downtown area. Just to its north runs the multiuse Downeast Sunrise Trail, which occupies the former railroad right-of-way of the Washington County Railroad. The station is a long rectangular single-story wood-frame structure, with a gable roof that has broad overhanging eaves supported by chamfered braces. The walls are clad in weatherboard. A three-sided ticket booth projects on the track side, next to an operable switching signal. The track side facade features two large freight entrances, one at ground level, the other raised about 2 feet (0.61 m) above the ground to facilitate direct offloading from freight cars. The interior has retained most of its original woodwork, despite conversion of its passenger waiting area into a freight storage area in the 1950s.

The Washington County Railroad was incorporated in 1894, began construction on its rail lines the following year, and ran its first train in 1899, delayed by funding issues. Despite lofty projections of profitability, the line, which ran between Brewer and Calais, was financially unsuccessful, and its assets were auctioned in 1903 and leased to the Maine Central Railroad. During its brief lifespan, the railroad constructed 24 stations, most according to a standardized design, of which five survive. The Machias station was built in 1898 and enlarged in 1910. In 1957 the building was converted to a freight depot, at which time the freight doors on the track side were added and interior alterations made. The rail line was abandoned in 1985.

The building is now owned by the town, which granted a $1 lease to the local chamber of commerce. The chamber in 2015 embarked on a fundraising campaign to complete restoration of the interior for use as a visitors center and meeting space.

== See also ==
- National Register of Historic Places listings in Washington County, Maine

Preceding station	Maine Central Railroad	Following station
Whitneyville toward Washington Junction	Washington County Railway	East Machias toward Calais
