= Brunswick Branch =

The Brunswick Branch is a railroad line in Maine, United States, which was operated by the Maine Central Railroad. It is now part of the Pan Am Railways system.

The Brunswick Branch junctions with the Maine Central's mainline at Royal Junction and continues through the center of Yarmouth before meeting the St. Lawrence and Atlantic Railroad (ex-Canadian National Railway, née-Grand Trunk Railway) at Yarmouth Junction. The tracks cross at a 90-degree angle. The Brunswick Branch continues through Freeport, where the line crosses under U.S. 1. After going through the center of Freeport, the line ends in Brunswick, where it meets the Rockland Branch, which is now owned by the Maine Department of Transportation and leased to the Canadian Pacific Railway.

The Brunswick Branch is the southern end of the former Lower Road.

== Route mileposts ==
- Milepost 0: Royal Junction with the former Maine Central Back Road.
- Milepost 1.8: Yarmouth Junction with St. Lawrence and Atlantic Railroad
- Milepost 7.3: Freeport
- Milepost 16: Brunswick junction with the Maine Eastern Railroad and former Lewiston Branch.
