= Downeast Scenic Railroad =

Heritage railroad in Ellsworth, Maine

- Locale: Maine
- Terminus: Calais

Commercial operations
- Name: Calais Branch
- Built by: Maine Central Railroad
- Original gauge: 4 ft 8 1/2 in (1,435 mm)

Preserved operations
- Owned by: Track owned by Maine DOT
- Operated by: Downeast Rail Heritage Trust
- Reporting mark: DSRX
- Length: 4 miles (6.4 km) (2010); 13 miles (21 km) (2019)
- Preserved gauge: 4 ft 8 1/2 in (1,435 mm)

Commercial history
- Opened: 1898
- Closed to passengers: 1957
- Closed: (?)

Preservation history
- 2005: Downeast Rail Heritage Trust founded
- 2010: Open
- Headquarters: Ellsworth

Website
- http://www.downeastscenicrail.org/

The Downeast Scenic Railroad (reporting mark DSRX) is a heritage railway in Ellsworth, Maine which is owned and operated by the Downeast Rail Heritage Trust, which is a 501(c)3 charitable organization founded in the fall of 2005. The railroad operates over the historic Calais Branch which was once part of the Maine Central Railroad. Operations are out of Washington Junction and runs west towards Brewer. The railroad inaugural run was Saturday, 24 July 2010, with invited guests on board. The first 4 miles (6.4 km) to Ellsworth Falls have been completed, but work continues on the line west of Ellsworth Falls from Ellsworth to Green Lake where the railroad plans to run excursion trains in the near future.

== Equipment ==
=== Locomotives ===
Locomotive details
Number	Builder	Type	Build	Status	Notes
1055	Alco	S-4	1950	Operational	Acquired from the Conway Scenic Railroad, on April 9, 2010 and arrived at Washington Jct. on May 23, 2010. Ex-Conway Scenic and nee-Portland Terminal unit. This engine is the primary engine used to pull the excursion trains.
54	General Electric	70-ton switcher	1948	Operational	Acquired from the Belfast and Moosehead Lake Railroad. This ex-Belfast and Moosehead Lake unit was the first engine for the Downeast Scenic and is the backup unit. This engine had the honors to pull the inaugural train on July 24, 2010.
53	Davenport Locomotive Works	30-ton switcher	1949	Operational	This unit was donated by R&R Contracting, and refurbished by Independent Locomotive Services of Bethel, Minnesota. This unit (which was delivered in August 2009) spent a majority of its life working the ore docks in Duluth, Minnesota. This engine is used as needed to help in switching duties around the Washington Junction railyard.
470	Alco	4-6-2	1924	Under restoration	Owned by New England Steam Corporation. Purchased from the city of Waterville, ME in November 2015, 470 was the last steam engine to operate for the Maine Central Railroad on June 13, 1954.

=== Rolling stock ===
Rolling stock details
Number	Builder	Type	Build Date
82	Russell Snow Plow Company	Snow plow	1952
155	Laconia Car Company	Passenger car	1910
102	Delaware and Hudson Railroad	Combination passenger / Baggage car	1904
124	Magor Car Corporation	Open-air car	1964
26	Magor Car Corporation	Flatcar	1964
214	Bethlehem Car Works	Flatcar	1944
46	American Car and Foundry	Hopper car	1944
2608	Reading Company	Caboose	1926
