= Edwin Noyes =

Maine state senator

Edwin Noyes was a railroad developer and state legislator in Maine. He served in the Maine Senate in 1850.

Noyes worked for the Androscoggin and Kennebec Railroad and its successor Maine Central.
