= Yarmouth Junction station =

Coordinates: 43.81547°N 70.19029°W

The station building in the 19th century

Yarmouth Junction station was a passenger rail station in Yarmouth, Maine, United States. It stood to the west of East Elm Street at Depot Road, at the junction of the former Grand Trunk Railway (now the St. Lawrence and Atlantic Railroad) and the Maine Central Railroad (now Guilford Rail System's Kennebec & Portland), around 0.9 miles (1.4 km) north of the town's Railroad Square, where today's 1906-built Grand Trunk station stands. The Amtrak Downeaster utilizes the former Maine Central Railroad line, which passes to the northwest of town. The Yarmouth Junction station building is now gone, but the junction itself is still active.

There have been discussions about developing the line between Yarmouth Junction and Brunswick, Maine.

== History ==
In 1915, the Portland Stock Yards and Trading Company leased around 40 acres (16 ha) of land at the junction to support its shipment facilities down in Portland, Maine, the state's most populous city. It built stables (which could accommodate around one thousand horses), granaries, a hospital and offices. Around the same time, troops of the French Army were forming there from points to the west in preparation to ship out from Portland on steamships.

== References in popular culture ==
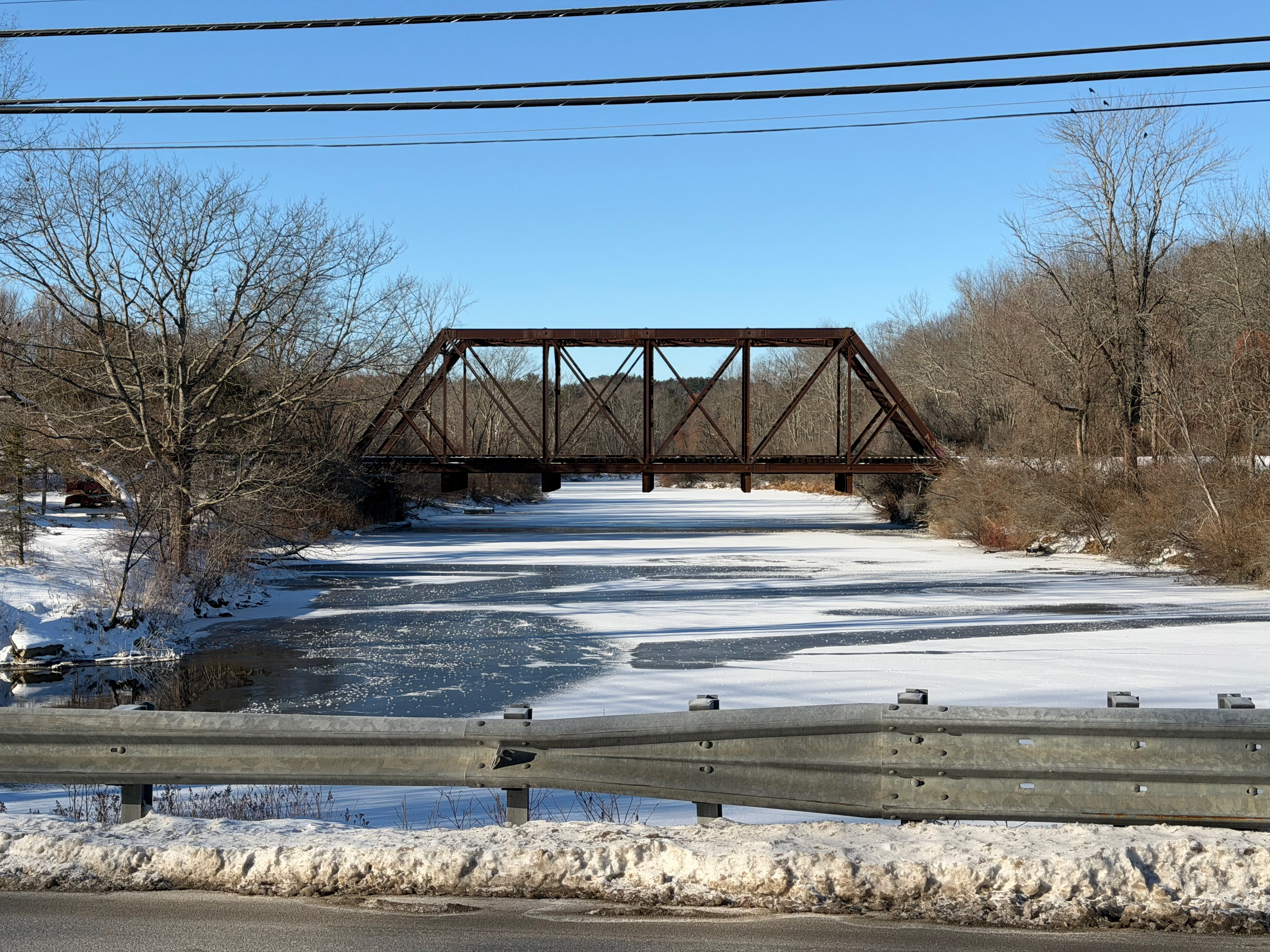
The St. Lawrence and Atlantic Railroad trestle

Patches of snow still dotted the ground when 20-year-old Maren Madsen arrived by train at Yarmouth Junction in May 1892.

She had just returned from visiting family in her native Denmark, and having returned to Yarmouth on a Sunday, there was no taxi service available. At the depot north of town, she set out walking along the tracks, suitcase in hand, her eyes locked on the smokestacks of the sprawling Forest Paper Co. mill complex on the Royal River.

Just above Fourth Falls, she crossed the narrow planks of the train trestle on her hands and knees, fearful of the deep water swirling below. She was eager to get back to work and see old friends.

"That's what I was aiming for," Maren Madsen Christensen wrote in her memoir, Fra Jyllands Brune Heder til Landet Over Havet (Eng: From Jutland's Brown Heather to the Land Across the Sea). Christensen, a native of Ølgod, Denmark, died in 1965, aged 93. She is buried in Yarmouth's Riverside Cemetery alongside her husband, Christian (m. July 3, 1894), who predeceased her by 29 years, and two of their four children: son Einar and daughter Gloria. (Einar served in the United States Army; Gloria in the U.S. Navy.) Another, daughter Marie, died after giving birth in 1919. She is buried in Walnut Hill Cemetery in North Yarmouth, Maine, alongside her husband, Ernest Hayes Allen. Another daughter, Thora, married Sidney Maurice Hamilton. They are interred in Portland's Evergreen Cemetery.

Preceding station	Canadian National Railway	Following station
North Yarmouth toward Montreal	Montreal – Portland	Yarmouth toward Portland
Preceding station	Maine Central Railroad	Following station
Cumberland Junction toward Portland	Main Line	Freeport toward Bangor
