= Bangor Union Station =

Train station in Bangor, Maine from 1907 to 1961

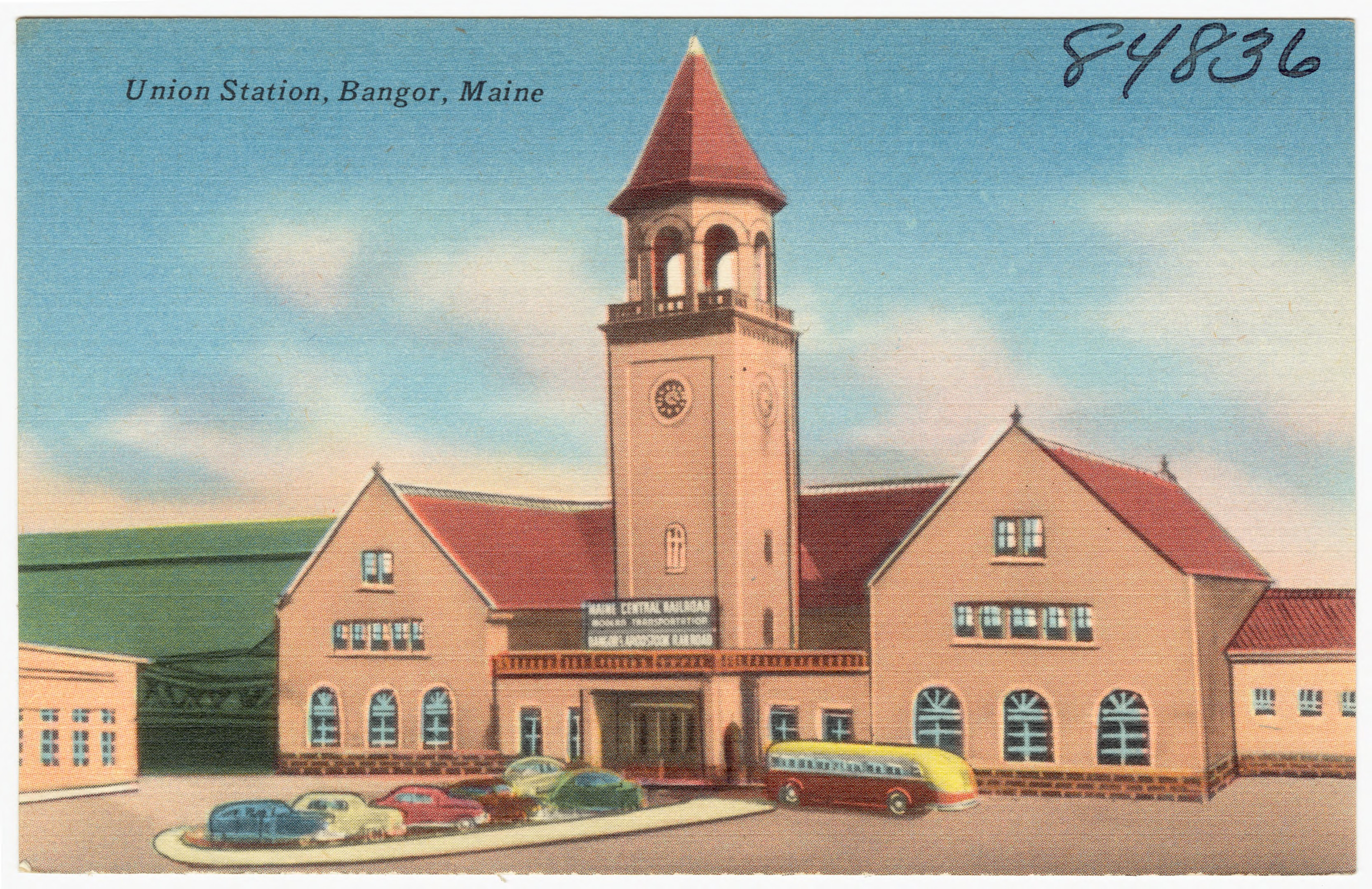
- Circa-1940 postcard of the station

General information
- Location: Exchange Street at Washington Street; Bangor, ME
- Coordinates: 44.799°N 68.767°W
- Line: Maine Central Railroad
- Tracks: 8
- Connections: Bangor and Aroostook Railroad

History
- Opened: 28 July 1907
- Closed: 30 November 1961

Former services
Preceding station	Bangor and Aroostook Railroad	Following station
Terminus	Main Line	Northern Maine Junction toward Grand Isle
North Bangor toward South LaGrange	Searsport – South LaGrange	Reverses direction
Northern Maine Junction toward Searsport	Searsport – South LaGrange	Reverses direction
Preceding station	Maine Central Railroad	Following station
Northern Maine Junction toward Portland	Main Line	Terminus
Terminus	Bangor – Bar Harbor	Brewer Junction toward Mt. Desert Ferry
Terminus	Bangor – Vanceboro	Mt. Hope toward Vanceboro
Brewer Junction toward Bucksport	Bucksport – Bangor	Terminus
Location

Bangor Union Station was a passenger train station in Bangor, Maine. Long the state's second-largest railroad station, it was served by the Maine Central Railroad and the Bangor and Aroostook Railroad. In 1961, the railroads ended service to the station, which was then demolished to avoid an annual property tax of $10,788 on an assessed valuation of $372,000.

The station site is now occupied by the Penobscot Plaza Shopping Center.

== Construction ==
The station was designed for the Bangor & Aroostook and the Maine Central by architect Henry B. Fletcher, who had designed stations for the Boston and Maine Railroad. Built under the supervision of Elbridge A. Johnston, the station was 154 feet (47 m) long and 82 feet (25 m) wide with a 40-foot (12 m)-by-29-foot (8.8 m) wing and a separate 250-foot (76 m)-by-30-foot (9.1 m) building for baggage, mail, and package express rooms. The station with a clock tower on the front was built of buff-colored brick with brownstone trimmings and base. The 130-foot (40 m) clock tower was capped with a steeply peaked roof above an open octagonal cupola. The principal entrance was defined by a porte-cochère opening into an 18-foot (5.5 m) vestibule to a 41-foot (12 m)-by-84-foot (26 m) waiting room with an adjoining dining room, kitchen, and storeroom. A women's retiring room and toilet were to the right side of the vestibule, and the ticket office, agent's office, news stand, smoking room, and men's toilet were on the opposite side of the vestibule. Marble flooring was used in the entrance, waiting room, dining room, smoking room, and women's retiring room. The station included a 500-foot (150 m) train shed covering eight tracks.

== Location ==
The station was built on the west bank of the Penobscot River estuary, just upstream of the confluence with Kenduskeag Stream. The train shed extended upstream from the station, covering tracks between the station and the Penobscot River. Three tracks ran through and the remaining five were stubs extending downstream. The Maine Central Eastern Division main line extended upstream from the station to connect with the Canadian Pacific Railway to the Maritimes at Vanceboro, Maine. Maine Central Eastern Division branch line trains to Calais, Bar Harbor, or Bucksport required backing moves to cross the Penobscot River bridge approach upstream of the station. The stub tracks served trains crossing Kenduskeag Stream departing or arriving from the Bangor and Aroostook or from the Maine Central Portland Division to the Boston and Maine Railroad connection at Portland, Maine.
