= Washington County Railroad =

Washington County Railroad or Railway may refer to:

- Washington County Railroad (1980), short line in Vermont
- Washington County Railroad (1900–1901), predecessor of the Pittsburgh and West Virginia Railway in Pennsylvania
- Washington County Railroad (1856–1868), predecessor of the Southern Pacific Company in Texas
- Washington County Railroad (1864), predecessor of the Baltimore and Ohio Railroad in Maryland
- Washington County Railway (1903–1911), predecessor of the Maine Central Railroad in Maine
  - Washington County Railroad (1893–1903), predecessor of the above
