= Somerset Railroad =

Somerset Railroad may refer to:

- Somerset Railroad (New York), operated by CSX Transportation to serve a power plant near Buffalo
- Somerset Railroad (Maine), predecessor of the Maine Central Railroad, branching from the main line near Waterville
