= Falls Road Railroad =

Short-line railway joining Lockport and Brockport, New York, U.S.

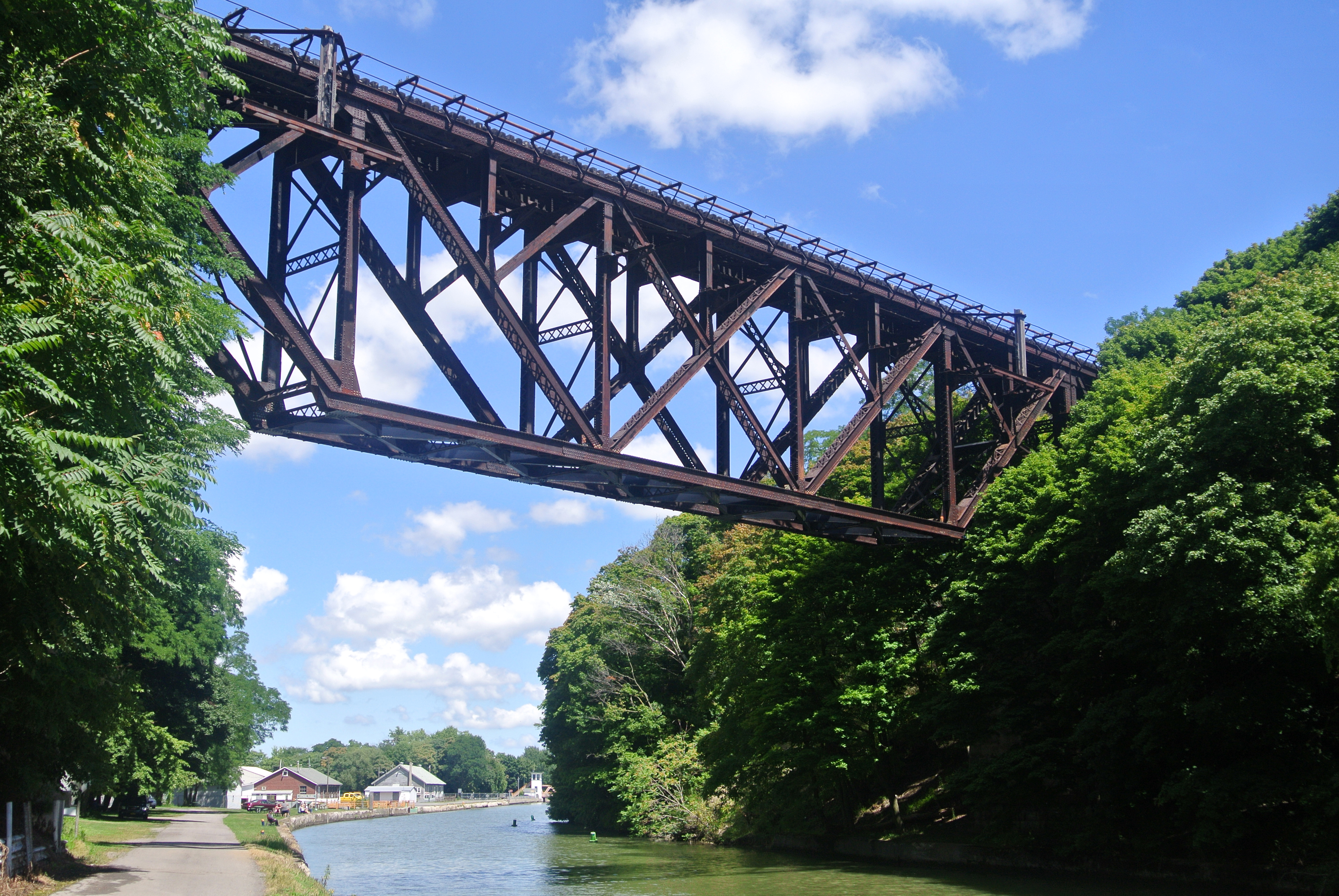
- Bridge used by the Falls Road Railroad in Lockport, New York

Overview
- Headquarters: Batavia, New York
- Reporting mark: FRR
- Locale: New York
- Dates of operation: 1996–present

Technical
- Track gauge: 4 ft 8 1/2 in (1,435 mm) standard gauge

Other
- Website: Genesee Valley Transportation, FRR Subsidiary

The Falls Road Railroad (reporting mark FRR) is a Class III short line railroad owned by Genesee Valley Transportation (GVT). The railroad operates in Niagara, Orleans, and Monroe counties in New York.

== Operations ==
The railroad's right-of-way consists of 41.69 miles (67.09 km) of track, known as the Falls Road Branch, originally part of the New York Central Railroad linking Niagara Falls and Rochester. The line passed to the Penn Central and then to Conrail ownership before being acquired on October 15, 1996. Dispatching is handled by Genesee Valley's operations center in Scranton, Pennsylvania. A yard and engine house are maintained in Lockport, NY, where the railroad interchanges with CSX. The railroad is known for its use of Alco locomotives.

The name Falls Road originates from the Lockport and Niagara Falls Railroad, and was adopted by New York Central. In 1994, Conrail abandoned twelve miles (19 km) of track between Rochester and Brockport, New York; the Falls Road Branch now terminates in Brockport, west of Owens Road at Mile Post 16.60. The Falls Road provides rail service to several fertilizer, transload, and produce customers in the area, as well as the Western New York Energy, LLC ethanol plant near Medina, New York. In June 2024, the Falls Road entered into a new contract with Tropicana shipping orange juice to Brockport for distribution by truck into southern Canada. An engine house will be built and maintained in Brockport to assist the railroad in handling the added traffic.

== Niagara & Western New York ==
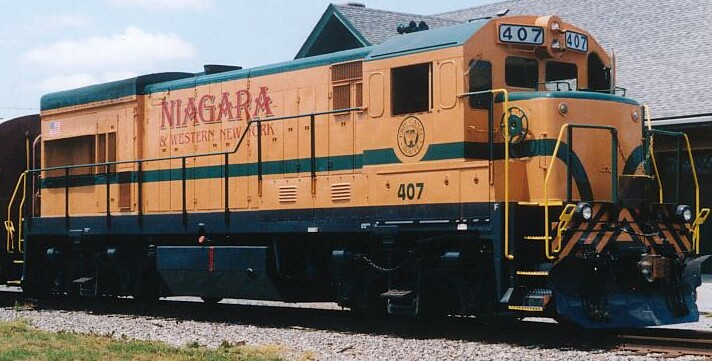
Niagara and Western New York Railroad excursion train at Medina in 2002

The Niagara & Western New York Railroad (reporting mark NIAX) was a short-lived company that operated a heritage railroad and excursion train service over the tracks of the Falls Road Railroad. Trains operated between Lockport and Medina, New York for a single season in 2002. Three locomotives were leased from Guilford Rail System: two GE U18Bs and one EMD GP7, all of Maine Central Railroad heritage. The railroad operated three passenger cars.
As of 2025 the Falls Road operates occasional excursion service for the Medina Railroad Museum utilizing the museum's passenger cars.
