= Kennebec and Portland Railroad =

American railroad company

Overview
- Dates of operation: 1836–1864
- Successor: Portland and Kennebec Railroad

Technical
- Track gauge: 1,435 mm (4 ft 8 1/2 in)
- Length: 71.2 miles (114.6 km)

The Kennebec and Portland Railroad was a railway company in the United States. It was chartered in 1836, and constructed its original line between Portland, Maine, and Augusta, Maine, between 1849 and 1851. This line became part of the Maine Central Railroad main line. The company also built a branch line from Brunswick, Maine, to Bath, Maine. The company was consolidated with the Portland and Kennebec Railroad in 1864; that company became part of the Maine Central Railroad in 1874.

== History ==
The company was chartered by the Maine legislature on April 1, 1836, but disputes over its northern terminus delayed development. An early figure in the development of the Kennebec and Portland Railroad was Robert Hallowell Gardiner, grandson of Silvester Gardiner, who had founded Gardiner, Maine. Gardiner proposed a railroad that would connect Portland, Maine, to Gardiner, and then run west via railroad or canal to Winthrop, Maine. This was opposed by interests in Augusta, Maine, including future senator Reuel Williams.

Construction of the Kennebec and Portland Railroad main line finally began in 1849. In that year it opened between Bath, Maine, and Yarmouth Junction, northwest of Yarmouth, Maine, where it crossed the St. Lawrence and Atlantic Railroad. In 1850 it was extended south to Portland. The northern extension to Augusta opened on December 29, 1851.

The railroad ran into financial difficulties and the Portland and Kennebec Railroad was incorporated in 1862 to replace it. The older company was formally consolidated with the newer one on January 1, 1864.
