= Sebasticook and Moosehead Railroad =

- Map of the Sebasticook and Moosehead Railroad and the MEC's extension of it to Harmony

Overview
- Locale: central Maine
- Dates of operation: 1886–1910

Technical
- Track gauge: 4 ft 8 1/2 in (1,435 mm) standard gauge
- Length: 17.5 miles (28.2 km)

The Sebasticook and Moosehead Railroad was a 19th-century Maine railroad which became the 20th century Harmony Branch of the Maine Central Railroad.

== History ==
Monson, Maine, wanted a railroad to transport slate from their quarries to customers outside of Maine. The Monson and Athens Railroad built south from Monson, while the Sebasticook and Moosehead built north along the Sebasticook River from the Maine Central at Pittsfield. Track was completed from Pittsfield to Hartland in 1886, but the Monson end of the line stopped at a connection with the Bangor and Aroostook Railroad.

The seaport city of Wiscasset, Maine, began building the Wiscasset and Quebec Railroad inland in 1894 to increase trade through their harbor. Plans to include the Sebasticook and Moosehead as part of Wiscasset's route to Quebec were thwarted by inability to negotiate a crossing of the Maine Central line.

The Sebasticook and Moosehead had been extended as far as Mainstream by 1901 as an independent railroad receiving a share of revenues from traffic transferred to the Maine Central at Pittsfield. As part of the New England transportation monopoly organized by the New York, New Haven and Hartford Railroad, Maine Central leased the Sebasticook and Moosehead in 1910, purchased the company in 1911, and extended the line to Harmony in 1912. The line was known as Maine Central's Harmony Branch until 1966. It became known as the Hartland Branch when the extension from Hartland to Harmony was abandoned that year. The remaining Hartland Branch was abandoned in 1983.

Original Locomotives: 1886-1911

#1, Taunton Locomotive Works 4-4-0 Built in 1866 as Old Colony #87. Sold in 1886 to the S&M. Scrapped 1897.

1st #2, Rhode Island Locomotive Works 0-4-4t Built new in 1892 as number 2 for the S&M. Traded to the Maine Central 1896 for Second #2 in 1896. Became Maine Central #105. Renumbered in 1900 as #3. Scrapped 1920.

2nd #2, Portland Company 4-4-0 Built 1871 for the Portland & Ogdensburg Railway as their #5. Became Maine Central Railroad #105 in 1888 when the P&O was leased to the Maine Central. Traded in 1896 for S&M's First number 2 and became their Second number 2. Scrapped by 1901.

3rd #2, Hinkley Locomotive Works 4-4-0 Built at an unknown date. Purchased used by the Somerset Railroad in 1888 as their Second number 2. Sold to the S&M in 1901, and was not renumbered. Scrapped 1911.

#3, Rhode Island Locomotive Works 4-4-0 Built 1889 as Upper Coos & Hereford Railroad #4. Became Maine Central #129 in 1890 when the UC&H was leased to the Maine Central. Renumbered to 83 in 1900. Sold in 1900 to the S&M as #3. Reacquired by the Maine Central when the S&M was leased in 1911, again, becoming #83. Scrapped 1915.

== Railway mileposts ==
- Milepost 0: Pittsfield on the Maine Central main line
- Milepost 3.9: West Palmyra
- Milepost 6.1: Thompson's
- Milepost 8.1: Hartland agent's station
- Milepost 8.6: Dupont's
- Milepost 13.2: Cyr's
- Milepost 15.5: Mainstream
- Milepost 17.5: Harmony agent's station
