= Dexter and Newport Railroad =

Overview
- Locale: central Maine
- Dates of operation: 1868–1868

Technical
- Track gauge: 4 ft 8 1/2 in (1,435 mm) standard gauge
- Length: 29.5 miles (47.5 km)

Maine Central Railroad constructed a Foxcroft Branch in two stages after completing its main line from Portland to Bangor. The Dexter and Newport Railroad was completed in 1868 northward from Newport Junction on the Maine Central main line to Dexter. The completed railroad was leased by the Maine Central the following year. An extension northward from Dexter to Foxcroft on the Piscataquis River was completed in 1889 as the Dexter and Piscataquis Railroad. The branch became a major pulpwood loading point through the 1970s; but was abandoned in 1990.

== Railway mileposts ==
- Milepost 0: Newport Junction on the Maine Central main line
- Milepost 2.0: Camp Benson
- Milepost 7.0: Corinna agent's station
- Milepost 9.5: Lincoln's Mills
- Milepost 11.6: Moody's
- Milepost 15.3: Dexter agent's station
- Milepost 17.9: Lily Pond
- Milepost 20.0: Silver's Mills agent's station
- Milepost 22.5: West Dover
- Milepost 24.2: Starbird's
- Milepost 24.8: Sand Hills
- Milepost 29.5: Dover and Foxcroft agent's station
