= Gull (train) =

Overview
- Service type: Inter-city rail
- Status: Discontinued
- First service: March 2, 1930
- Last service: September 5, 1960
- Former operators: Boston and Maine Railroad; Maine Central Railroad; Canadian Pacific Railway; Canadian National Railway

Route
- Termini: North Station (Boston); Halifax
- Distance travelled: 730 miles (1,170 km)
- Average journey time: 24 hours
- Service frequency: Daily
- Train number: Southbound: 8, northbound: 23

On-board services
- Sleeping arrangements: Pullman section, drawing room, compartment
- Catering facilities: Dining car

The Gull was an international passenger train service between Boston, United States, and Halifax, Canada, which operated from 1930 to 1960. Journey time was approximately 24 hours. Westbound trains left Halifax shortly after breakfast and crossed the Canada–United States border in the late evening, as eastbound trains were leaving Boston's North Station to cross the border about dawn. Travel was over the Boston and Maine Railroad from Boston to Portland, Maine, then over the Maine Central Railroad to the border between Vanceboro, Maine, and Saint Croix, New Brunswick, then over the Canadian Pacific Railway to Saint John, New Brunswick, and over the Canadian National Railway to Halifax.

== Equipment ==
Through sleeping cars between Boston and Halifax were the core of service initiated 2 March 1930. Through coaches operated between Boston and Saint John. Canadian National operated through coaches between Saint John and Halifax with a dining car between Halifax and Moncton, New Brunswick, and a buffet car between Moncton and Saint John. Through sleeping cars were carried between Boston and Bangor, Maine, and transferred to connecting trains over the Maine Central between Bangor and Calais, Maine, and over the Bangor and Aroostook Railroad between Bangor and Van Buren, Maine. Connecting Bangor & Aroostook trains carried through coaches between Boston and Van Buren and a buffet car between Bangor and Van Buren. Until 1946 the Gull made connections with Canadian National branch line service at Saint John to Prince Edward Island and at Moncton to Newfoundland via Sydney, Nova Scotia.

The Gull carried a diverse assortment of baggage cars, express cars, and mail cars from the five railroads offering through service. These were often conventional heavyweight cars, but included Bangor & Aroostook open-platform, steel-underframe wood baggage cars in the years before World War II, and Boston & Maine converted troop sleeper baggage cars after the war. Boston received fish from the Maritimes in express reefers and milk from Newport, Maine, in Pfaudler milk cars leased to HP Hood. The train often included Boston & Maine lightweight American Flyer coaches built in the 1930s by the Pullman Company's Osgood Bradley Car Company plant in Worcester, Massachusetts. Stainless steel coaches started appearing in the train after a joint order by Maine Central and Boston & Maine in 1947. Stainless steel sleeping cars were delivered to the Bangor & Aroostook and Boston & Maine in 1954. The train was typically pulled by 4-6-2 steam locomotives, although Maine Central and Boston & Maine EMD E7s were used in the United States after World War II.

== Merchandise-Mail trains ==
The Gull was the last non-RDC train using North Station when service was discontinued 5 September 1960. Head-end cars had outnumbered cars for passengers during the final years of operation, and the Maine Central attempted to retain that traffic using their EMD E7s to pull merchandise-mail trains on the former Gull schedule. These trains resembled passenger trains with a string of baggage and express cars no longer needed for passenger service followed by a combine car serving as a caboose. Lightweight baggage cars had been unusual on this route until the Bangor and Aroostook's American Flyer cars were purchased by the Maine Central in 1961. Without direct connections to Boston, the service was uncompetitive with highway trucks and was discontinued 30 September 1963.
