= Androscoggin and Kennebec Railroad =

Former railroad company in Maine, US

Overview
- Locale: central Maine
- Dates of operation: 1847–1862

Technical
- Track gauge: 4 ft 8 1/2 in (1,435 mm) standard gauge
- Previous gauge: converted from 5 ft 6 in (1,676 mm) in 1871

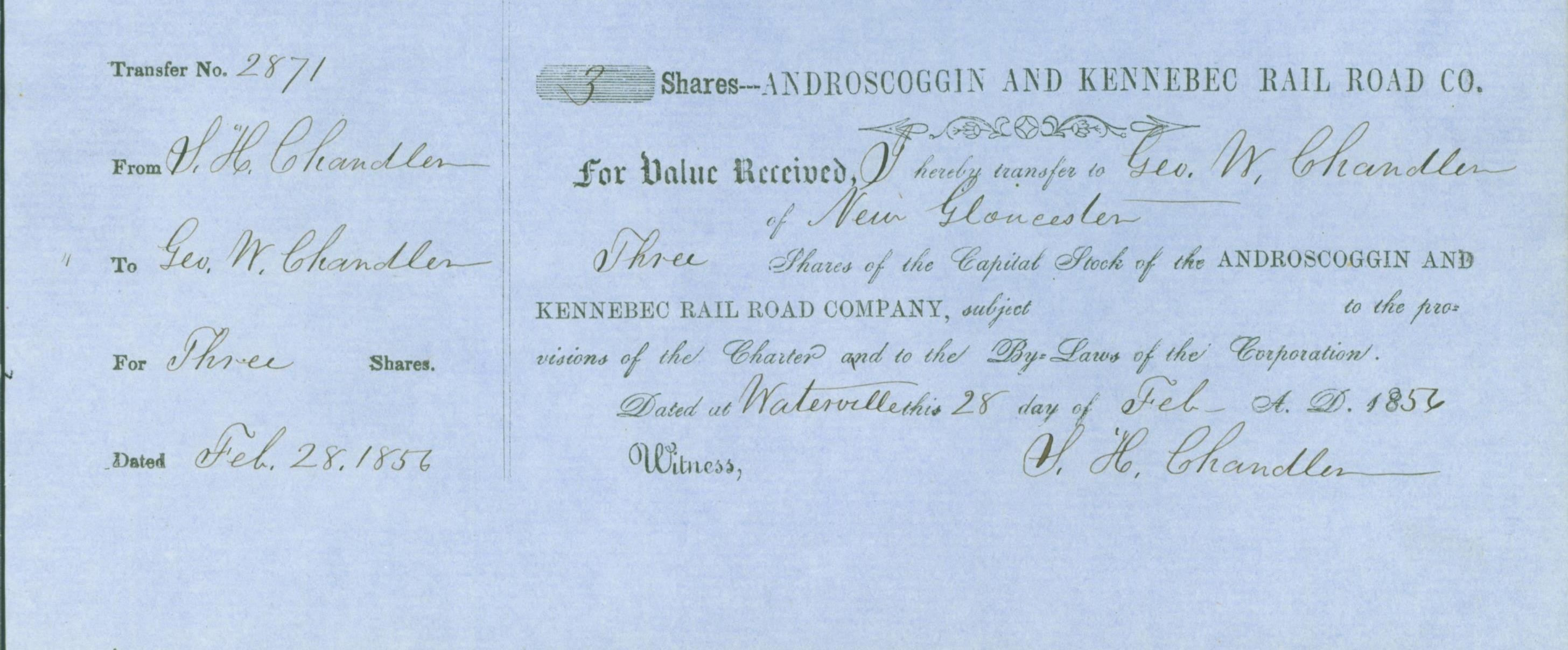
Transfer certificate of the Androscoggin and Kennebec Rail Road Company, issued 28 February 1856

The Androscoggin and Kennebec Railroad (A&K) is a historic U.S. railroad which operated in Maine.

The Androscoggin and Kennebec Railroad Co. received a charter on March 28, 1847, and by January 1850 had built a line between Waterville, Maine, and Danville, Maine (now Auburn). At Waterville, the A&K connected with the Penobscot and Kennebec Railroad (P&K). At Danville, the A&K connected with the Atlantic and St. Lawrence Railroad, which opened in 1853 and was subsequently sold to Grand Trunk Railway.

In 1846, the year that the P&K was chartered, a law was enacted permitting both the P&K and A&K to consolidate under a new name. The legislation was not acceptable to both companies, thus the A&K was chartered in 1847. The P&K and A&K did not merge until after the contentious section of the previous merger legislation was repealed on September 9, 1862. The following month on October 28, 1862, the A&K and P&K merged to form the Maine Central Railroad.

Edwin Noyes worked for it.0
