= Portland and Ogdensburg Railway =

Railway in Maine and New York

Portland & Ogdensburg Railway
- Full extent of the Portland and Ogdensburg Railway, with the Ogdensburg and Lake Champlain
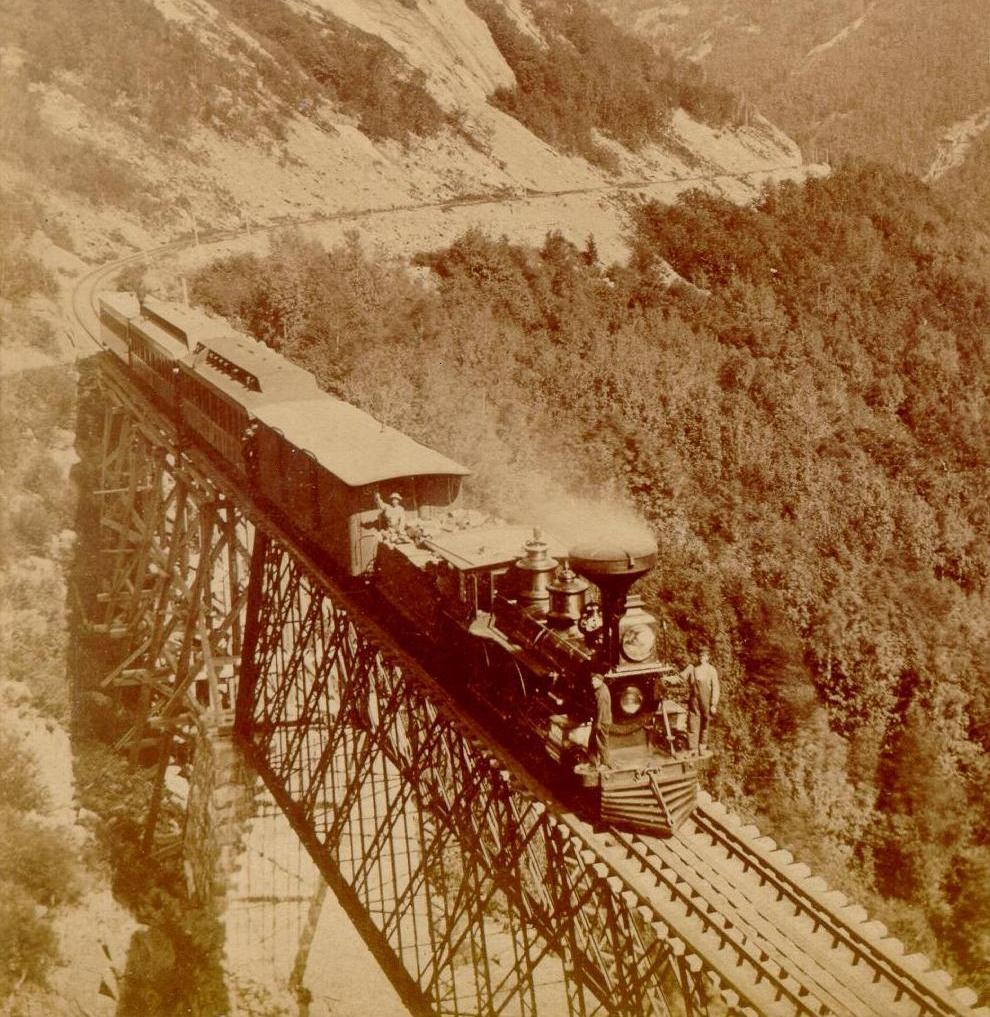
- Willey Brook Bridge in the White Mountains

Overview
- Locale: west from Portland, Maine

Technical
- Track gauge: 4 ft 8 1/2 in (1,435 mm) standard gauge

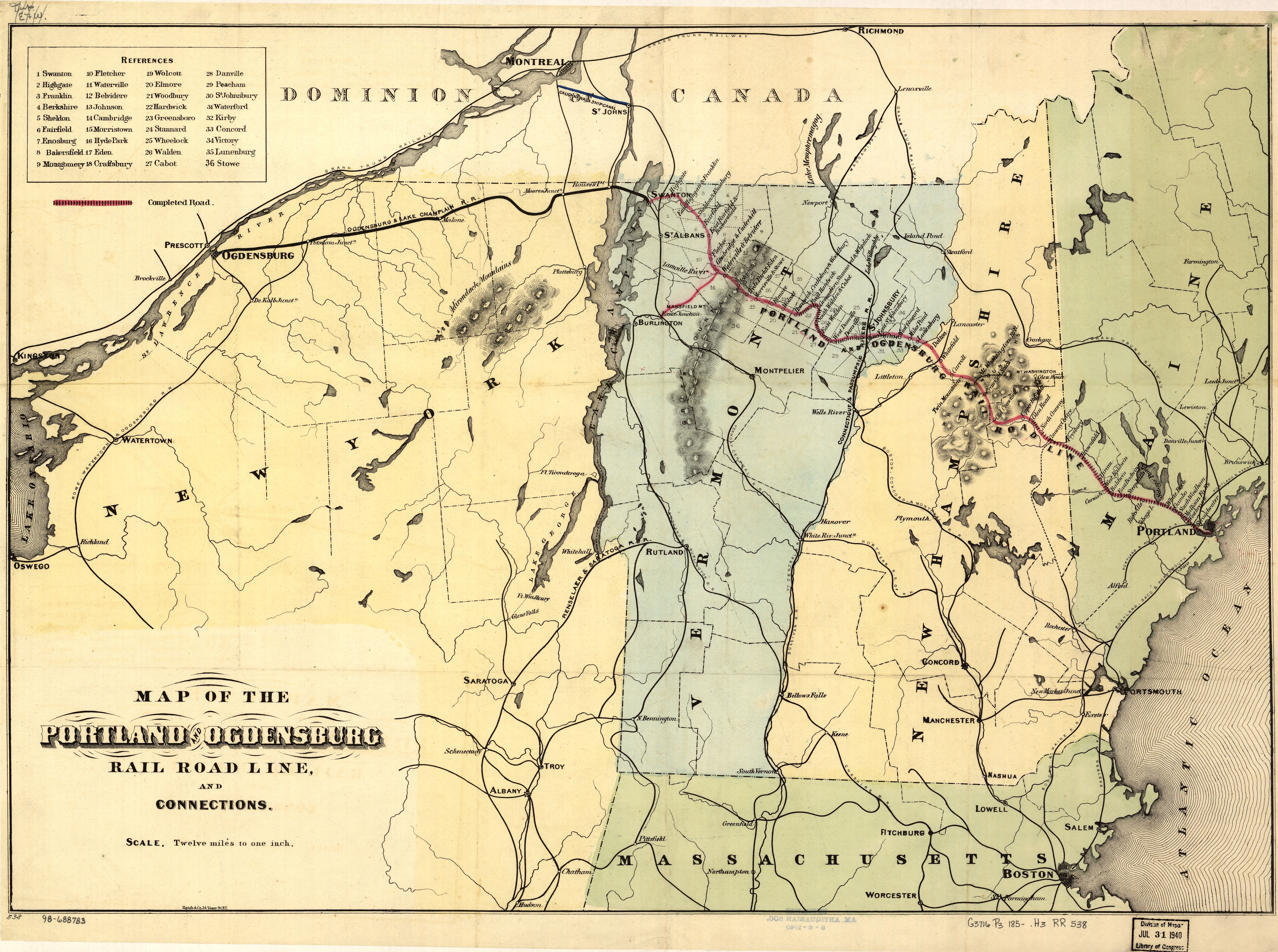
1870s map

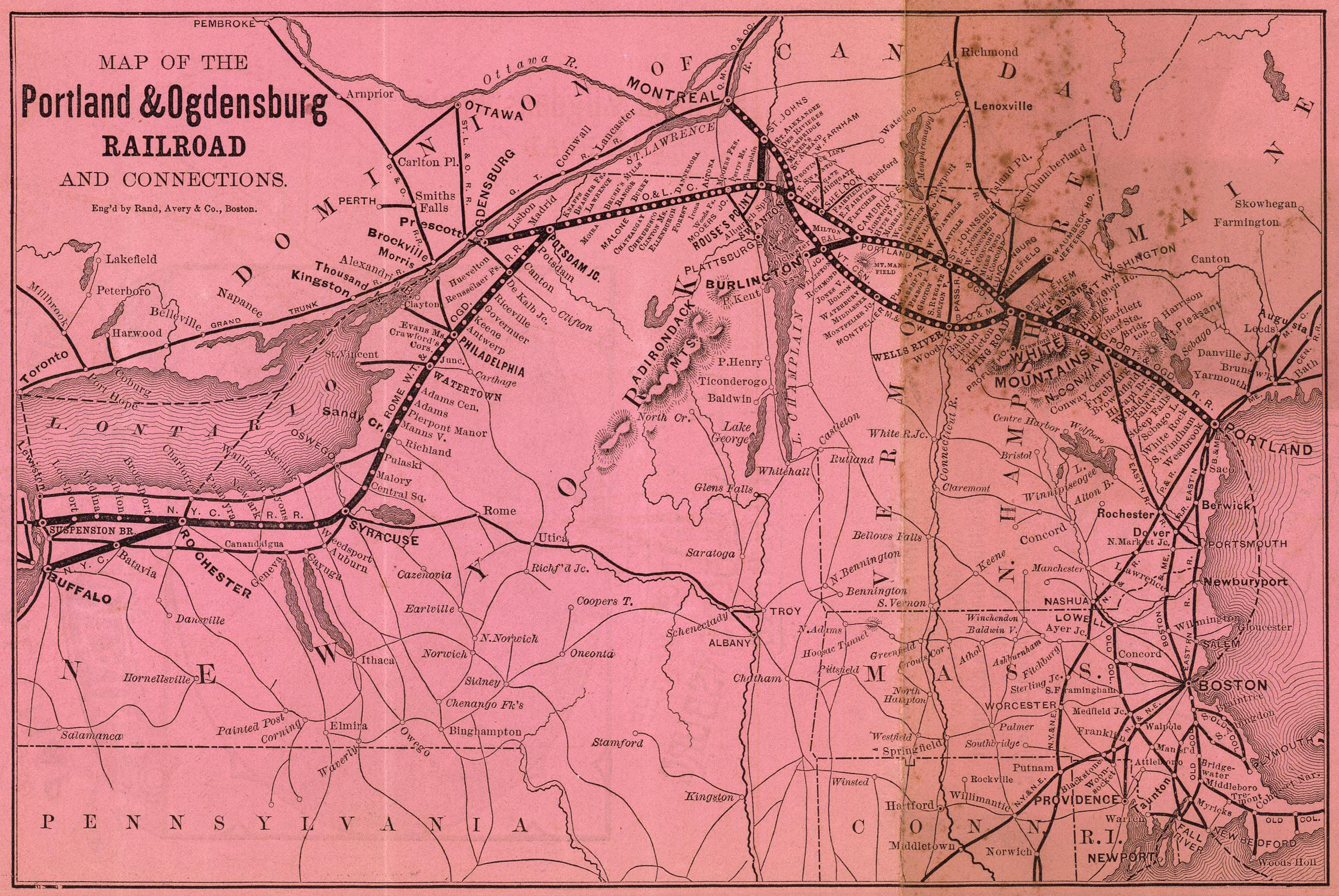
1879 map

The Portland & Ogdensburg Railroad was a railroad planned to connect Portland, Maine to Ogdensburg, New York. The plan failed, and in 1880 the Vermont section was reorganized and leased by the Boston & Lowell Railroad. In 1886, the Maine and New Hampshire section was reorganized as the Portland & Ogdensburg Railway. That part was leased to the Maine Central Railroad in 1888, and in 1912 the Maine Central leased the eastern part of the Vermont section from the Boston & Maine Railroad, the successor to the B&L.

== History ==
With the growth of the American Midwest and Upper Canada, transportation between those areas and the outside world became an issue. The natural connector was the Great Lakes and St Lawrence River, but the river had rapids in some areas and froze in the winter. Alternative transportation to an ice-free port by rail was possible, and Boston increased in importance as a result, but Boston's monopoly position proved bothersome to Great Lakes and especially Montreal interests, who began to look for alternatives. Portland, Maine, was the most northerly ice-free port on the east coast of North America, and attracted attention as an outlet. The problem was building a railroad from a lake or river port to Portland. Montreal's solution was the St. Lawrence and Atlantic Railroad, but this left Great Lakes interests out.

The Portland & Ogdensburg Railroad was chartered on February 11, 1867 to run from Portland to Fabyan, a junction at Carroll, New Hampshire in the White Mountains, where the Boston, Concord & Montreal Railroad would continue west. In the summer of that year John Neal and other Portland business representatives traveled to Oswego, New York to determine the route's feasibility and determined it so. The two companies' track joined in a ceremony at the summit of Crawford Notch on August 7, 1875, then opened on August 16, 1875.

In 1864, the Essex County Railroad was chartered to run from St. Johnsbury, Vermont, on the Connecticut & Passumpsic Rivers Railroad, east to Lunenburg on the border with New Hampshire. The Montpelier & St. Johnsbury Railroad was chartered in 1866 to run west from St. Johnsbury to Montpelier. The Lamoille Valley Railroad was chartered in 1867 to run from West Danville on the planned M&SJ northwest to Swanton. The three companies were consolidated on August 7, 1875 to form the Vermont Division of the Portland & Ogdensburg Railroad, and the construction that had started was continued, except that the part of the M&SJ west of West Danville was never built.

Construction on the Vermont Division began in 1871, and was complete in 1877. To connect between the two divisions, the company at first used trackage rights over the Boston, Concord and Montreal Railroad from Fabyan to Dalton, New Hampshire, but soon built its own alignment. West of Swanton, the P&O was allied with the Ogdensburgh & Lake Champlain Railroad, running west from Rouses Point, New York to Ogdensburg, and used the Vermont & Canada Railroad to access it.

The Montreal, Portland & Boston Railway opened in 1876 from Montreal, Quebec to the national border, and was planned to continue into Vermont as a branch of the P&O.

Just after completion of the Vermont Division the company went bankrupt, was taken over by the receiver on October 19, 1877. The Vermont Division was reorganized as the St. Johnsbury & Lake Champlain Railroad on January 31, 1880. On August 9, 1882 the Montreal, Portland & Boston Railway leased it, but it was soon taken over by the Boston & Lowell Railroad.

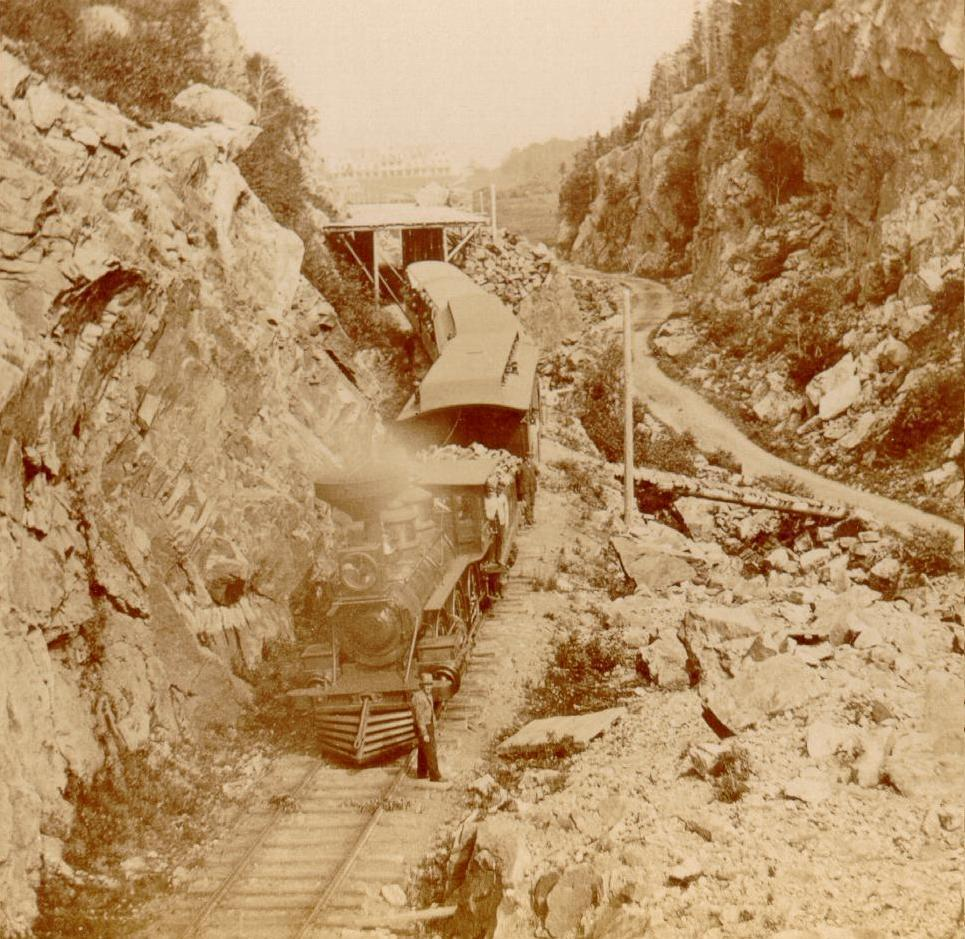
Gates of Crawford Notch, "the Big Cut", looking northwest c. 1880s

The main division was reorganized on June 8, 1884 as the Portland & Ogdensburg Railway, and on August 20, 1888, the Maine Central Railroad leased it as their Mountain Division (some of which survives as the Conway Scenic Railroad, a heritage railroad). In July 1912, the Maine Central Railroad leased the old Vermont Division, but on August 1, 1927 the lease was terminated, and a new lease was made on only the part east of St. Johnsbury. The remainder of the Vermont Division operated as the St. Johnsbury & Lake Champlain Railroad until reorganized as the St. Johnsbury & Lamoille County Railroad in 1948.

== Locomotives ==
Main Division Locomotives
Number	Name	Builder	Type	Date	Works number	Notes
1st #1	Presumpscot		4-4-0	1847		ex-Boston and Providence Railroad scrapped 1879
2nd #1	Presumpscot	Souther	4-4-0	1851		ex-Portland and Kennebec Railroad #6 Richmond then Maine Central Railroad purchased 1879 rebuilt to 0-4-0 scrapped 1885
2	Saco	Portland Company	4-4-0	1870	183	re-boilered after boiler explosion in 1874 became Maine Central Railroad #102 in 1888
3	Sebago	Portland Company	4-4-0	1870	182	became Maine Central Railroad #103 in 1888
4	Ossipee	Portland Company	4-4-0	1870	173	became Maine Central Railroad #104 in 1888
5	Fryeburg	Portland Company	4-4-0	1871	189	became Maine Central Railroad #105 in 1888
6	Pequawket	Portland Company	4-4-0	1873	246	became Maine Central Railroad #106 in 1888
7	Carrigain	Portland Company	2-6-0	1872	221	re-boilered in 1884 became Maine Central Railroad #107 in 1888
8	Crawford	Portland Company	4-4-0	1875	329	became Maine Central Railroad #108 in 1888
9	Frankenstein	Portland Company	2-6-0	1875	330	became Maine Central Railroad #109 in 1888
10	Resolution	Portland Company	2-6-0	1881	404	became Maine Central Railroad #110 in 1888
11	Webster	Portland Company	4-4-0	1882	452	became Maine Central Railroad #111 in 1888
12	Kearsarge	Hinkley Locomotive Works	4-4-0	1884	1574	became Maine Central Railroad #112 in 1888
13	Chocarua	Portland Company	2-6-0	1884	537	became Maine Central Railroad #113 in 1888
14	Avalon	Portland Company	2-6-0	1884	538	became Maine Central Railroad #114 in 1888
15	Willey	Portland Company	4-4-0	1884	529	became Maine Central Railroad #115 in 1888
16	Willard	Portland Company	4-4-0	1884	530	became Maine Central Railroad #116 in 1888

Vermont Division Locomotives
Number	Name	Builder	Type	Date	Works number	Notes
1	St. Johnsbury	Portland Company	4-4-0	1871	190	became St. Johnsbury and Lake Champlain Railroad #1 in 1880
2	Lamoille	Portland Company	4-4-0	1871	196	became St. Johnsbury and Lake Champlain Railroad #2 in 1880
3	Swanton	Portland Company	4-4-0	1871	204	became St. Johnsbury and Lake Champlain Railroad #3 in 1880
4	Hyde Park	Portland Company	4-4-0	1871	202	became St. Johnsbury and Lake Champlain Railroad #4 in 1880 then sold to Wild River Railroad about 1891
5	Essex	Portland Company	4-4-0	1871	207	became St. Johnsbury and Lake Champlain Railroad #5 in 1880
6	Maquam	Mason Machine Works	4-4-0	1872	593	became St. Johnsbury and Lake Champlain Railroad #6 in 1880
7	Mansfield	Mason Machine Works	4-4-0	1872	595	became St. Johnsbury and Lake Champlain Railroad #7 in 1880
