= GE U18B =

American diesel-electric locomotive

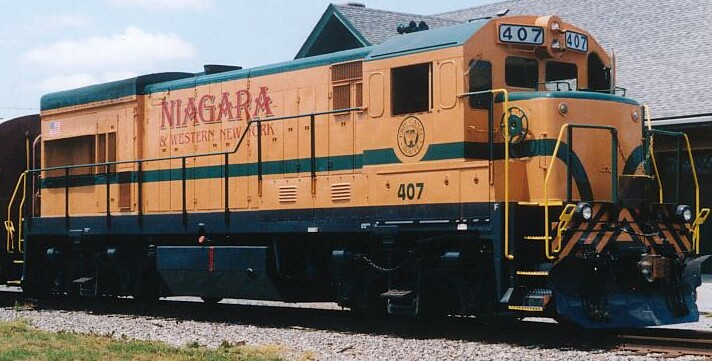
- A Maine Central Railroad U18B, on lease to the short-lived Niagara and Western New York Railroad, July 2002
Type and origin
- Power type: Diesel-electric
- Builder: General Electric
- Model: U18B
- Build date: March 1973 – October 1976
- Total produced: 163
Specifications
- Configuration
  - AAR: B-B
  - UIC: Bo′Bo′
- Gauge: 4 ft 8 1/2 in (1,435 mm) standard gauge
- Length: 54 ft 8 in (16.66 m)
- Prime mover: GE 7FDL-8
- Engine type: V8 4-stroke diesel
- Aspiration: Turbocharger
- Displacement: 5,344 cu in (87.57 L)
- Cylinders: 8
- Cylinder size: 9 in × 10.5 in (228.6 mm × 266.7 mm)
- Transmission: DC generator, DC traction motors
- Loco brake: Straight air, Dynamic
- Train brakes: 26-L Air
Performance figures
- Power output: 1,800 hp (1.34 MW)
Career
- Operators: Maine Central Railroad, Seaboard Coast Line Railroad
- Numbers: 400 - 409 (Maine Central) 250 - 392 (Seaboard Coast Line)
- Nicknames: Baby Boats
- Locale: North America
- Retired: 1994 (from class 1 revenue service)
- Disposition: Some units in service on Shortline use

The GE U18B diesel-electric locomotive was introduced by GE Transportation as a branch line road switcher locomotive in 1973. It was the only North American locomotive powered by the 8-cylinder 7FDL engine. The U18B was not a popular seller with GE only making 163 of them, and they were mostly purchased by Maine Central and Seaboard Coast Line. Due to their size, the locomotives were given the nickname Baby Boats. Railroads lost interest in specialized road units entering the 1970s. The U18Bs were noted for having reliability issues and being underpowered. The Maine Central referred to their U18Bs as the Independence class and named their units after revolutionary war heroes. GE included information about a B18-7 locomotive (which would have followed the U18B) in its 1978 "Series-7 Road Locomotives" service manual, but none of these updated units were ordered, sold, or built. 8 ex CSX U18Bs, nos. 9500 - 9508, can be found in service on the Pickens Railway located in the Upstate Region of South Carolina, no. 9501 being used as a parts source.

== Original Owners ==
Image	Railroad	Quantity	Numbers	Notes
	Maine Central Railroad	10	400–409	Blomberg trucks; part of a cancelled SCL order
	Ferrocarriles Nacionales de México	45	9000–9044	AAR type-B trucks
	Providence and Worcester Railroad	1	1801	FB-2 trucks
	Seaboard Coast Line Railroad	105	250–261, 300–392	325-392 with Blomberg trucks, all others FB-2. All to CSX. 10 additional units on order but cancelled
	Texas Utilities	2	101–102	AAR type-B trucks

== See also ==
- Maine Central
- Seaboard Coast Line
