= Penobscot and Kennebec Railroad =

Overview
- Locale: central Maine
- Dates of operation: 1845–1862

Technical
- Track gauge: 4 ft 8 1/2 in (1,435 mm) standard gauge
- Previous gauge: converted from 5 ft 6 in (1,676 mm) by 1871

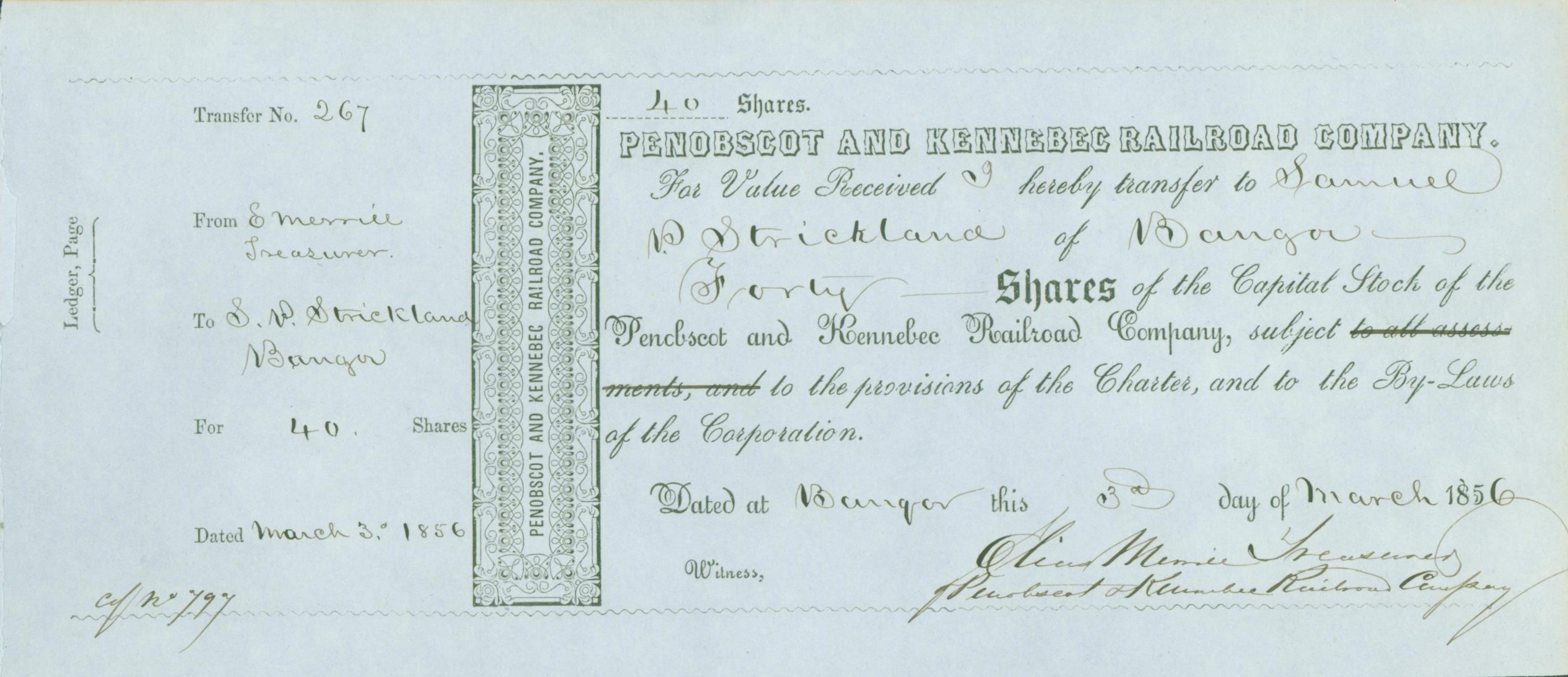
Transfer Certificate of the Penobscot and Kennebec Railroad Company, issued 3 March 1856

The Penobscot and Kennebec Railroad (P&K) is a historic U.S. railroad which operated in Maine.

The Penobscot and Kennebec Railroad Co. received a charter on April 5, 1845, and built a line between Bangor, Maine and Waterville, Maine. At Waterville the P&K connected with the Androscoggin and Kennebec Railroad (A&K). At North Maine Junction, the A&K connected with the Bangor and Piscataquis Railroad.

In 1845 the year that the P&K was chartered, a law was enacted permitting both the P&K and A&K to consolidate under a new name. The legislation was not acceptable to both companies, thus the A&K was chartered in 1847. The P&K and A&K did not merge until after the contentious section of the previous merger legislation was repealed on September 9, 1862. The following month on October 28, 1862, the A&K and P&K merged to form the Maine Central Railroad.
