= Somerset Railroad (Maine) =

Railroad line in the United States

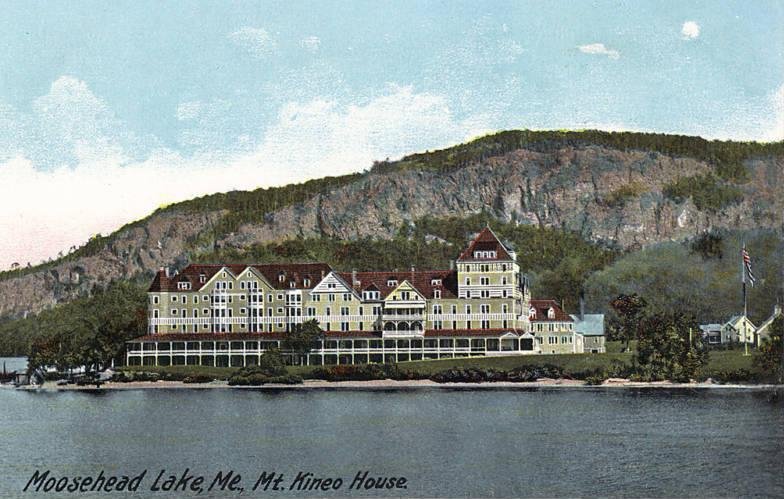
- The Mt. Kineo House in 1908

Overview
- Locale: Maine
- Dates of operation: 1873–1911
- Successor: Maine Central Railroad

Technical
- Track gauge: 4 ft 8 1/2 in (1,435 mm)
- Length: 91 miles (146 km)

The Somerset Railroad was built to serve Kennebec River communities and later extended through timberlands to a large wooden Victorian era destination hotel on Moosehead Lake. The railway became part of the Maine Central Railroad in 1911; and a portion remained in intermittent operation by Pan Am Railways until 2013.

== History ==
Somerset Railroad was chartered in 1860 to build north along the Kennebec River from the Maine Central Railroad "back road" at Oakland, Maine. The line originally shared the Maine Central Portland gauge of 5 ft 6 in (1,676 mm). Construction reached Norridgewock in 1873, Madison in 1875, and North Anson in 1877. The company defaulted in 1879 and was reorganized as the standard gauge Somerset Railway in 1884 before construction continued to Solon in 1889 and Bingham in 1890. The reorganized company extended the line to Moosehead Lake in 1906 and built a large resort hotel called the Mount Kineo House. The railroad had fifteen plush upholstered coaches, nine baggage cars, and twelve combination smoking-baggage cars with leather seats in the smoking section. Hotel patrons arrived on through Pullman cars from large eastern cities, and reached the hotel by steamboat from the railroad terminal at Kineo Station. Maine Central railroad purchased the Mount Kineo House with the Somerset Railway; and the railway became the Kineo branch of the Maine Central Railroad in 1911. Aboriginal forests had been converted to lumber and pulpwood before the last passenger train over the branch ran in September, 1933; and the line north of Bingham was dismantled that year. The Mount Kineo House was razed in 1938.

Mount Kineo was not the only destination sought by passengers on the Old Somerset Railroad. Many prominent figures of the time, such as Theodore Roosevelt and Henry David Thoreau, ventured to Maine's Somerset County in search of wilderness. Lake Moxie Station became the jumping off point for sporting camps and remote destinations north along the current U.S. Route 201 all the way up to The Forks, Lake Parlin, and Upper Enchanted Township.

Bingham became an important loading point for pulpwood floated down the Kennebec River to Wyman Dam until environmental regulations curtailed log driving in the 1970s. The former Madison Paper Industries paper mill at Madison was the last major customer on the branch originating or terminating 3,000 annual carloads in 1973. A portion of the line from Oakland to Madison remained in operation by Pan Am Railways until service was ended in 2013. Access to the remaining section of line from Madison to Embden is gated off at the former Madison Paper Industries mill. Track from Embden to Bingham has been removed but the roadbed remains in use as a rail trail. On June 24, 2021, Pan Am Railways had filed with the Surface Transportation Board to formally abandon the remaining section of line from Oakland to Madison and Embden. On November 30, 2021, The State of Maine announced the acquisition of a 32 mile section of the former rail line from Oakland north to Embden for conversion into a multi-use rail trail.

As of July 2022, all remaining track and ties have been removed with the exception of grade crossings covered by asphalt and the bridges.

As of October 2024, remaining grade crossing on Main St in Norridgewock has been removed.

== Railway mileposts ==
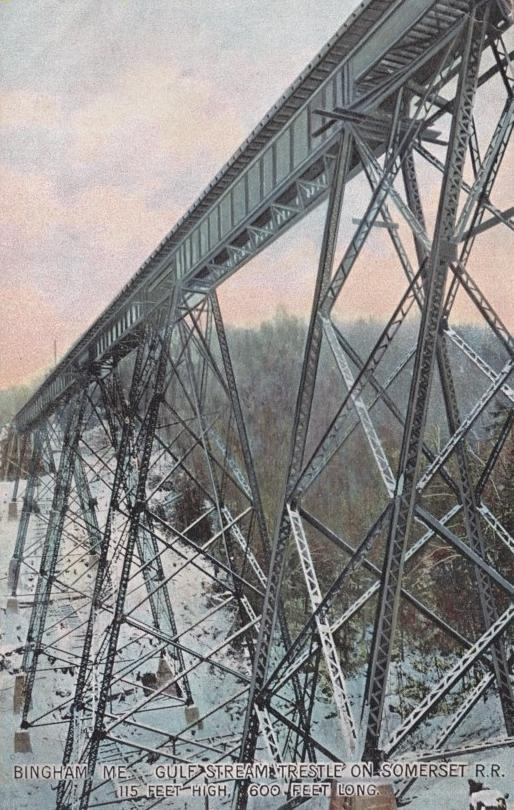
Gulf Stream Trestle at Bingham

- Milepost 0: Oakland on the Maine Central Back Road; location of railroad shops
- Milepost 5.5: Otis Hill
- Milepost 10.5: Bangs
- Milepost 13: Norridgewock
- Milepost 17: Totmans
- Milepost 20.9: Madison paper mill
- Milepost 21.3: Anson
- Milepost 25.3: North Anson
- Milepost 30.4: Embden
- Milepost 33.9: Solon pulp mill, potato house, and corn cannery
- Milepost 36.1: Merrills
- Milepost 41: Bingham
- Milepost 48.2: Deadwater sawmill
- Milepost 52.2: Bald Mountain logging branch
- Milepost 60.1: Mosquito
- Milepost 64.7: Lake Moxie sawmill
- Milepost 85.3: Somerset Junction (with the Canadian Pacific Railway International of Maine Division)
- Milepost 91.5: Kineo Station

== Early locomotives ==
Number	Name	Builder	Type	Date	Works number	Notes
	General Veazie	Kerk				former European and North American Railway locomotive leased from Maine Central Railroad during initial railway construction
	Somerset	Hinkley Locomotive Works	4-4-0			purchased used after service on the Portland, Saco & Portsmouth and Eastern railroads; replaced by Caratunk
1	Caratunk	Hinkley Locomotive Works	4-4-0			used locomotive purchased to replace Somerset
2	Black Dinah					used as a yard shunter after delivery of Old Point
2	Old Point	Portland Company	4-4-0	1869	150	purchased 1875
2		Manchester Locomotive Works	4-4-0	1901	1760	last locomotive to bear this number; became Maine Central Railroad # 84
3	Norridgewock		4-4-0			
4	Carrabassett		4-4-0			
5	Moxie		4-4-0			
6	Bombazeen		4-4-0			
7	Messalonskee	Manchester Locomotive Works	4-4-0	1900	1743	purchased new; became Maine Central Railroad # 85
10		American Locomotive Company (Manchester)	4-4-0	1907	41438	purchased new for passenger service; became Maine Central Railroad # 86
12		American Locomotive Company (Manchester)	4-4-0	1907	41439	purchased new for passenger service; became Maine Central Railroad # 87
20		Baldwin Locomotive Works	4-6-0	1905	26269	purchased new for freight service; became Maine Central Railroad # 106
21		Baldwin Locomotive Works	4-6-0	1905	26270	purchased new for freight service; became Maine Central Railroad # 107
22		American Locomotive Company (Manchester)	4-6-0	1906	41437	purchased new for freight service; became Maine Central Railroad # 108
23		American Locomotive Company (Manchester)	4-6-0	1906	41437	purchased new for freight service; became Maine Central Railroad # 109
