= Bucksport Branch =

Railroad line in Maine, United States

The Bucksport Branch is a railroad line in Maine that was operated by the Maine Central Railroad,and Pan Am Railways, it is currently operated by CSX Transportation.

The Bucksport Branch junctions with the mainline at Bangor and continues south down the Penobscot River valley, passing through Brewer and terminating at Bucksport.

This 19 mi (31 km) branch was chartered in 1873 as the Bucksport and Bangor Railroad after its grade had been surveyed in the autumn of 1872. Construction of the line began in the spring of 1873 with trains beginning to run regularly over its whole length on December 21, 1874. The company was reorganized as the Eastern Maine Shoreline Railway in 1882, and leased as the Maine Central Bucksport branch in 1883. The last passenger train from Bangor to Bucksport ran on 27 January 1932. In the latter decades of Maine Central operation, two freight trains per day were typically pulled by a cab-to-cab pair of Maine Central's EMD SW7s and SW9s until the locomotives were assigned elsewhere in the Guilford system. The paper mill at the end of the Bucksport Branch has been the primary customer of the line for many years and with its shutdown by mill owner Verso Paper Corporation The rail traffic on the line will diminish until another large customer can be found. The last rail car removal was on December 11, 2014. The train consist was GMTX 3005 and MEC 374, pulling sixteen tank cars and three boxcars.

== Route mileposts ==
- Milepost 0: Bangor.
- Milepost 1.2: Brewer Junction with the former Calais Branch.
- Milepost 9.4: South Orrington chemical plant originating or terminating 2,000 annual carloads in 1973.
- Milepost 19.3: Bucksport large paper mill and Penobscot Bay seaport originating or terminating 18,000 annual carloads in 1973.
