= Calais Branch =

Railroad line in Maine, United States

Map

The Calais Branch is a mothballed railroad line in Maine that was operated by the Maine Central Railroad Company (MEC).

The Calais Branch is 127 miles (204 km) long and connects Brewer to Calais. It was constructed in 1898 and carried freight and passengers over the years. Passenger service was discontinued in 1957 and freight service was discontinued over the majority of the western end of the line in 1984. The line also includes a spur to Eastport which joins the Calais Branch at Ayers Junction.

== History ==
The Calais Railway was chartered in 1832 as one of the first railway charters granted by the state of Maine. Construction started in 1835. The company was reorganized as the Calais Railroad in 1838 and opened a 2 miles (3.2 km) railway from Calais to Salmon Falls in 1839. Horses pulled cars over the railway until it was abandoned in 1841. The railway was re-activated and extended to Baring in 1852 as the Calais & Baring Railroad. Lewy's Island Railroad was chartered in 1854, and extended the railway from Baring through New Brunswick to Princeton in 1857. The railway was reorganized as the Saint Croix & Penobscot Railroad (StC&P) in 1870. The Washington County Railroad was chartered in 1893 to take control of StC&P and connect it to MEC's Bar Harbor branch at Washington Junction. The Washington County Railroad was completed in 1898, and became the Calais branch in 1911 after MEC gained controlling stock interest in 1904.

The Calais Branch was the longest of three MEC Eastern Division branches converging near Bangor. Trains leaving Bangor for Calais first traveled 31.5 miles (50.7 km) over the Bar Harbor branch. The Calais branch was considered to include the Bar Harbor branch after passenger service to Mount Desert Ferry was discontinued in 1937, and the first 1.2 miles (1.9 km) from Bangor to Brewer Junction have recently been considered part of the Bucksport branch.

== Route ==
- Milepost 0: Bangor
- Milepost 1.2: Brewer Junction with the 18-mile (29 km) Bucksport branch
- Milepost 10.5: Holden
- Milepost 17.3: Green Lake
- Milepost 29.1: Ellsworth
- Milepost 31.5: Washington Junction with the 10.8-mile (17.4 km) branch to Mount Desert Ferry
- Milepost 40.8: Franklin
- Milepost 55.8: Unionville
- Milepost 60.3: Cherryfield
- Milepost 66.1: Harrington
- Milepost 69.9: Columbia
- Milepost 77.2: Jonesboro
- Milepost 84.8: Whitneyville
- Milepost 88.7: Machias
- Milepost 110.6: Dennysville
- Milepost 117.4: Ayers Junction with the 16.4-mile (26.4 km) Eastport branch
- Milepost 130.0: Saint Croix Junction with the 17.8-mile (28.6 km) Princeton branch to Woodland
- Milepost 133.5: Calais

== Decline ==
The last passenger train from Bangor to Calais operated on 25 November 1957. Diesel-era freight service often used ALCO RS-2s, RS-3s and RS-11s between Bangor and Calais. A GE 44-ton switcher working out of Calais over the light rail of the Eastport branch was believed to be the last use of that model locomotive in regularly scheduled freight service on a class I railroad until the Eastport branch was abandoned in 1978. The paper mill at Woodland provided most of the traffic in the later years of operation. The mill originated or terminated over 6,000 carloads in 1973, while cumulative pulpwood and lumber loading at Ellsworth, Franklin, Cherryfield, Columbia Falls, Whitneyville, Machias, and Dennysville contributed less half that volume.

== Current ==
The Brewer–St. Croix Junction segment was abandoned in 1987 and later acquired by the Maine Department of Transportation (MaineDOT).

The Downeast Scenic Railroad leased the 30 mi (48 km) Brewer–Washington Junction segment in 2006 for operation as a heritage railway between Ellsworth and Green Lake. The Washington Junction–Ayers Junction segment was dismantled in 2011; its right of way is used for an interim rail trail, the Down East Sunrise Trail.

An isolated eastern section of the Calais Branch is in operation between St. Croix Junction and Milltown, where there is a connection with the New Brunswick Southern Railway at the Milltown Railway Bridge into Canada. At St. Croix Junction, the Woodland Spur continues northwest to Woodland, running through New Brunswick, Canada for several miles along the way. Together, these operable sections of the Calais Branch and the Woodland Spur measure 11.83 mi (19.04 km) in length.

The Woodland Spur is the only MEC trackage that crossed into New Brunswick. The spur was owned and operated by Pan Am Railways until being sold in 2012 to Woodland Rail; Woodland Rail has now contracted operation to New Brunswick Southern Railway.
