= Maine Central Railroad =

Defunct American Class I railway

Maine Central Railroad Company

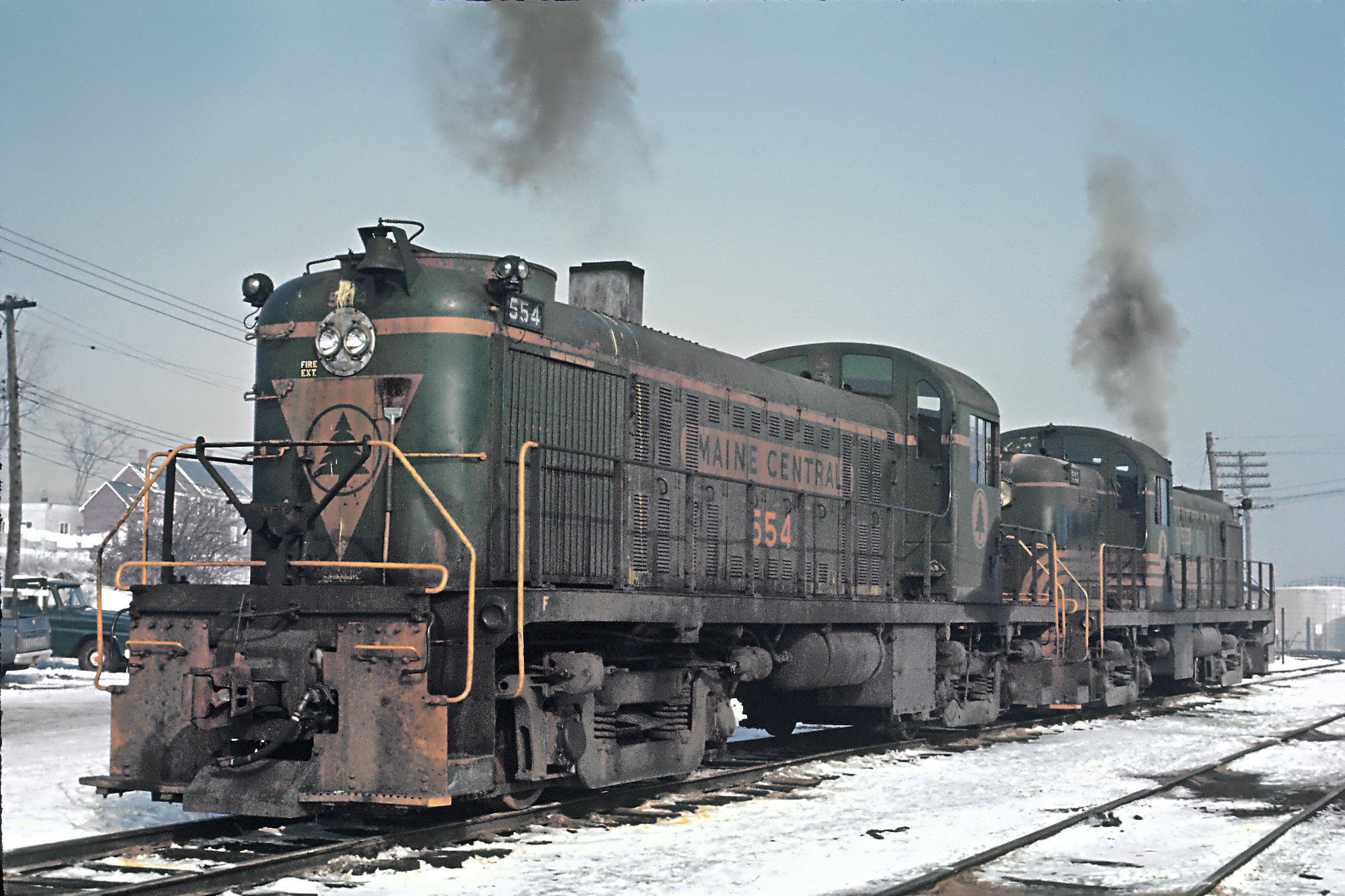
- Maine Central RS2 554 at Bangor, Maine. (1970)

Overview
- Headquarters: Portland, Maine
- Reporting mark: MEC
- Locale: Maine; New Brunswick; New Hampshire; Vermont; Quebec
- Dates of operation: 1862–1981
- Successor: Guilford Transportation Industries

Technical
- Track gauge: 4 ft 8 1/2 in (1,435 mm) standard gauge
- Previous gauge: originally 5 ft 6 in (1,676 mm) gauge on some lines
- Length: 1,121 miles (1,804 kilometers)

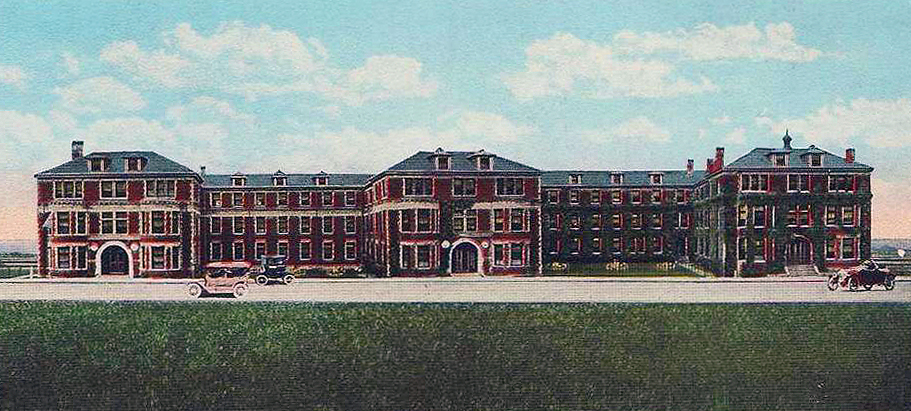
Maine Central headquarters, at 222 Saint John Street in Portland, built in 1916, seen here in 1920

The Maine Central Railroad (reporting mark MEC) was a U. S. class 1 railroad in central and southern Maine. It was chartered in 1856 and began operations in 1862. By 1884, Maine Central was the longest railroad in New England. Maine Central had expanded to 1,358 miles (2,185 km) when the United States Railroad Administration assumed control in 1917. The main line extended from South Portland, Maine, east to the Canada–United States border with New Brunswick, and a Mountain Division extended west from Portland to St. Johnsbury, Vermont, and north into Quebec. The main line was double track from South Portland to Royal Junction, where it split into a "lower road" through Brunswick and Augusta and a "back road" through Lewiston, which converged at Waterville into single track to Bangor and points east. Branch lines served the industrial center of Rumford, a resort hotel on Moosehead Lake and coastal communities from Bath to Eastport.

At the end of 1970, it operated 921 miles (1,482 km) of road on 1,183 miles (1,904 km) of track; that year, it reported 950 million ton-miles of revenue freight. The Maine Central remained independent until 1981, when it was purchased by Guilford Transportation Industries and became part of what is now CSX Corporation.

== History ==
=== Charter and creation ===
The Maine Central was created in 1862 through the merger of the Androscoggin and Kennebec Railroad and the Penobscot and Kennebec Railroad, resulting in a line from Danville (now Auburn) to Bangor. The line connected with the Grand Trunk Railway on its Portland-Chicago mainline at Danville and with the Bangor and Piscataquis Railroad in Bangor. As a result of its connection with the Grand Trunk, the Maine Central initially operated on a track gauge of 5 ft 6 in (1,676 mm) known as "Canadian" or "Portland gauge".

=== Expansion ===
Maine Central purchased the Portland and Kennebec Railroad, which ran from Portland to Augusta and was built to standard track gauge, since it connected with the Boston and Maine Railroad at Portland. By 1871, the Maine Central completed its conversion to standard gauge to facilitate interchange of cars.

The MEC established rail service to the Penobscot Bay in 1871 by leasing (for fifty years) the then just-completed 33-mile (53 km) of track built by the Belfast and Moosehead Lake Railroad (B&ML). The B&ML's grade ran the length of Waldo County from the port town of Belfast inland to Burnham Junction, where its single track connected with the MEC's Portland to Bangor mainline. Maine Central operated the road as its "Belfast Branch" for the next 55 years, but on June 30, 1925, MEC President Morris McDonald — after repeated public denials — gave the B&ML (and the city of Belfast as its majority owner) the required six months notice that it would not renew its by then year-to-year lease when it expired on December 31, 1925. The reason eventually given was a net loss to the MEC on the Belfast Branch operations of $113,230 for the year 1924. The B&ML took over operation of its road on January 1, 1926. It continued to exchange passengers and mail with the MEC at their jointly owned station at Burnham Junction until 1960 and freight interchange traffic until 2002.

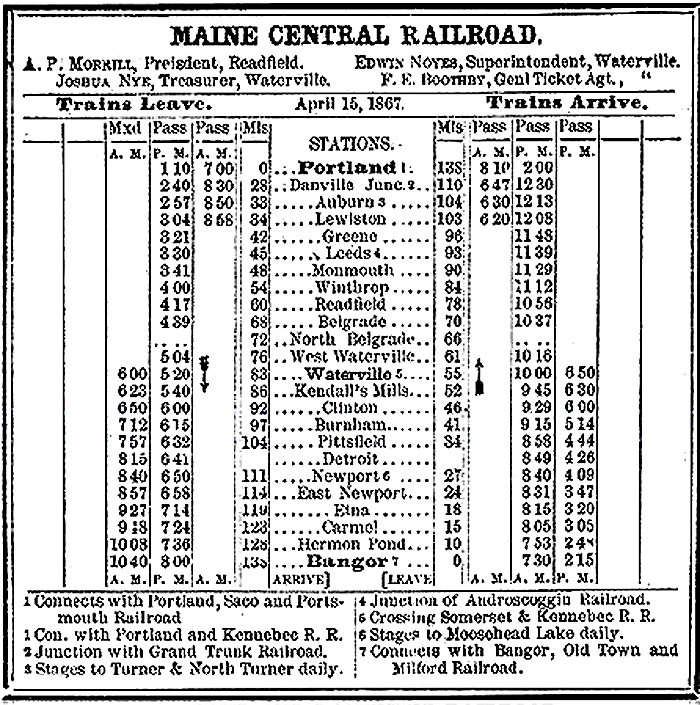
MEC Portland-Bangor 1867

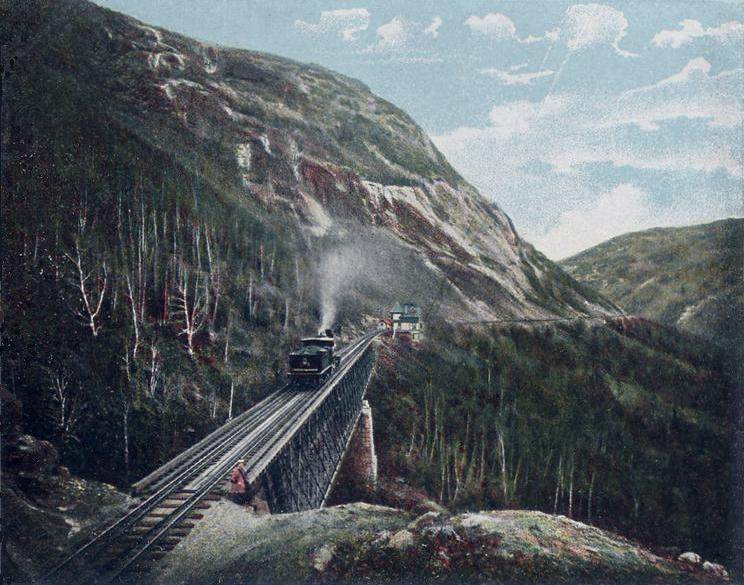
MEC locomotive crossing the Willey Brook Bridge in New Hampshire, c. 1906

In 1882, Maine Central leased the European and North American Railway (E&NA) between Bangor and Vanceboro. In 1889, the Canadian Pacific Railway purchased trackage rights from the Maine Central on the portion of the former E&NA from Mattawamkeag to Vanceboro. This Maine Central trackage formed part of the CPR's Montreal-Saint John mainline, upon completion of the International Railway of Maine. This line was an important rail route for Canadian war material heading to the port of Saint John for shipment overseas to Europe. In the months before the United States entered World War I, a German Army lieutenant attempted to blow up the railway bridge which crossed the St. Croix River at the international boundary. The lieutenant was arrested by Washington County sheriff Still Woodman, who later became chairman of Maine's Highway Department.

In 1888, the Maine Central leased the Portland and Ogdensburg Railroad, which ran from Portland, through the White Mountains of New Hampshire via Crawford Notch, and into St. Johnsbury, Vermont, where it connected with the Southeastern Railway (owned by the Canadian Pacific Railway). Maine Central also operated a line southeast from Bangor along the coast through Machias to Calais, with branches to Bucksport, Bar Harbor and Eastport. Maine Central gained stock control of the Sandy River and Rangeley Lakes Railroad in 1911 and the Bridgton and Saco River Railroad in 1912, and operated both as narrow gauge branch lines.

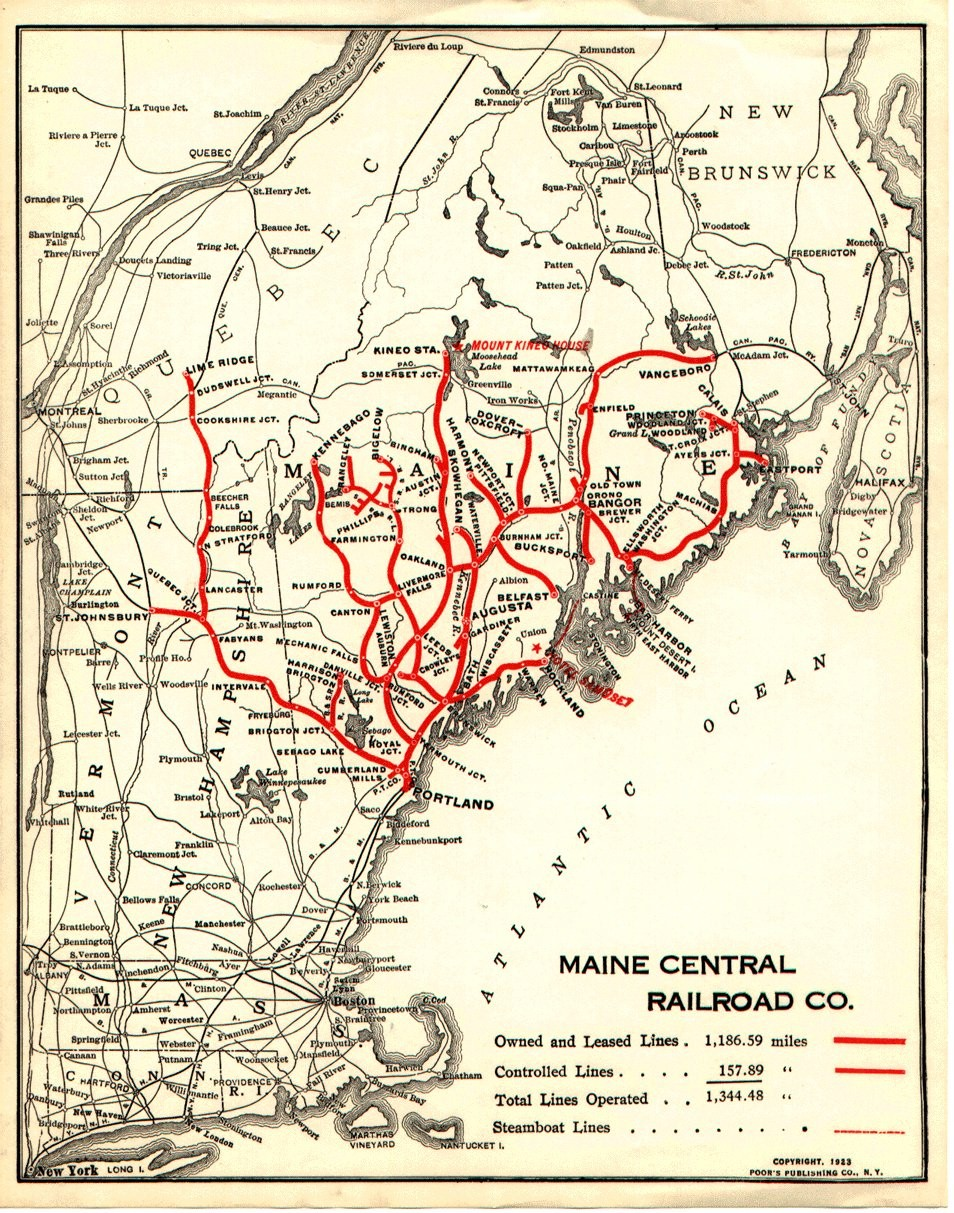
MEC system map. (1923)

The Maine Central was at its height by 1917 when it became nationalized during World War I under the United States Railroad Administration, having trackage which extended over 1,358 miles (2,185 km). It ran from Vanceboro, Calais and Eastport in the east, to Portland in the south, St. Johnsbury, Vermont in the west, and to Lime Ridge, Quebec in the north. It also operated resorts and coastal steamships and ferries.

The main repair facilities for locomotives and cars were located in Waterville, Maine. The first primitive shops were built in the 1850s, but by the 1880s it was apparent that these could no longer handle modern equipment. The city of Portland, Maine vied with Waterville to become the new shop site, but the railroad decided to remain in Waterville and constructed new, modern shops north of the old ones along the Kennebec River. By 1915 about 2,000 people were employed at the roundhouse, shops, and yards.

=== Chronology ===
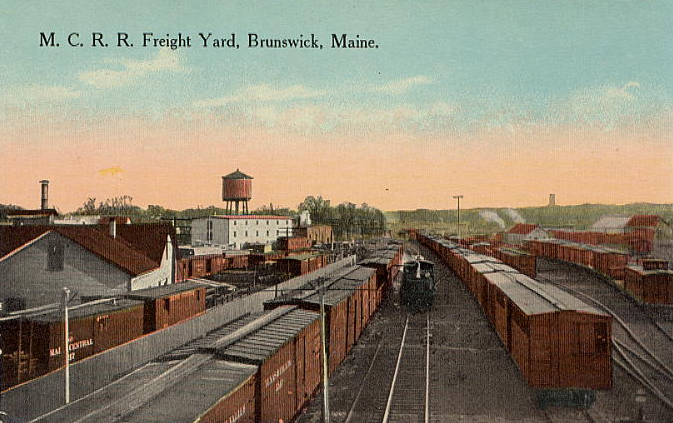
An MEC rail yard at Brunswick, Maine, on a c. 1910 postcard

- 1862 Merger of the Androscoggin & Kennebec and Penobscot & Kennebec created a Portland gauge Maine Central Railroad mainline from Danville Junction to Bangor.
- 1869 Maine Central leased the Foxcroft branch.
- 1870 Maine Central leased the competing standard gauge Portland & Kennebec Railroad from Portland to Skowhegan as the "lower road" mainline and Skowhegan branch; and completed the "back road" mainline from Royal Junction to Danville Junction.
- 1871 Maine Central leased the Belfast branch, Farmington branch, and Lewiston branch.
- 1882 Maine Central leased the European and North American Railway as the Eastern Division mainline from Bangor to Vanceboro; and gained majority stock control of Maine coastal steamboat service.
- 1883 Maine Central leased the Bucksport Branch.
- 1884 Maine Central leased the Bar Harbor branch.
- 1888 Maine Central leased the Portland and Ogdensburg Railroad as the Mountain Division from Portland to Saint Johnsbury, Vermont.
- 1888 Portland Union Station opened.
- 1890 Maine Central leased the Quebec Division.
- 1891 Maine Central leased the Rockland Branch.
- 1904 Maine Central gained majority stock control of the Calais Branch.
- 1907 Maine Central leased the Portland and Rumford Falls Railway as the Livermore Falls branch and Rangeley branch.
- 1907 Bangor Union Station opened.
- 1910 Maine Central leased the Harmony branch.
- 1911 Maine Central purchased the Kineo House and Kineo branch; formed the Portland Terminal Company; and gained majority stock control of the Sandy River and Rangeley Lakes Railroad.
- 1912 Maine Central gained majority stock control of the Bridgton and Saco River Railroad; and purchased the Samoset Hotel in Rockland.

=== Retraction ===
MEC "pine tree" herald

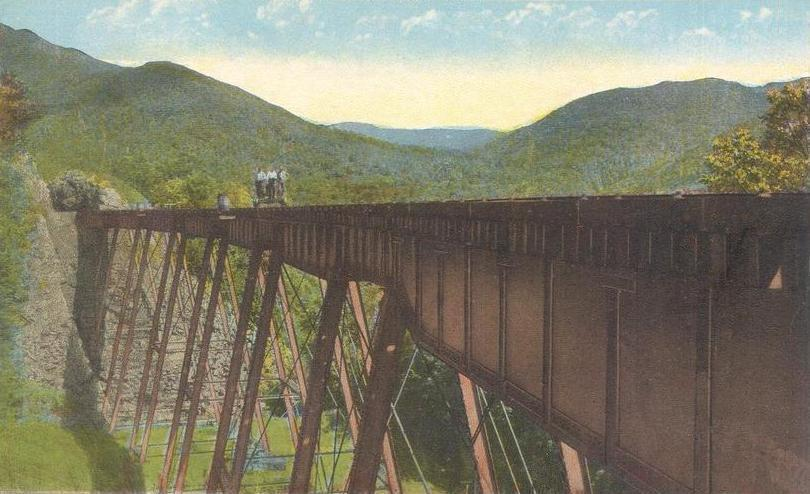
Frankenstein Trestle in New Hampshire, c. 1920

Following World War I, Maine Central began retracting. It sold or abandoned lines such as the narrow gauge and logging branches, as well as its hotels, ferries and steamships. In the 1930s it began to change its locomotives from steam-powered to diesel-powered. Beginning in 1933, Maine Central entered into a "joint management" agreement with the Boston and Maine Railroad, with which it shared the Portland Terminal Company (a switching railroad in Portland).

Faced with increased competition from cars, trucks and buses, Maine Central operated its last passenger train on September 5, 1960, and continued to reduce its freight business to reflect changing traffic.

=== Guilford ===
In 1980, the railroad was purchased by U.S. Filter Corporation and was then sold in 1981 to Guilford Transportation Industries, which later purchased the Boston and Maine Railroad (and thereby the Portland Terminal) in 1983 and the Delaware and Hudson Railway in 1984. Initially Guilford operated the system intact, although the system now permitted run-through traffic between central Maine and Boston. By the mid-1980s, Guilford began to rationalize its system and fully one-third of Maine Central's trackage was eliminated, including the "Mountain Division" from Portland to St. Johnsbury, Vermont; the "Rockland Branch" from Brunswick to Rockland; the "Calais Branch" from Bangor to Calais; and the "Lower Road" from Augusta to Brunswick. Guilford also forced many management and salary changes, resulting in a major strike against the company in 1986. Guilford Transportation also moved the Maine Central's headquarters from Portland to North Billerica, Massachusetts, in the mid-1980s.

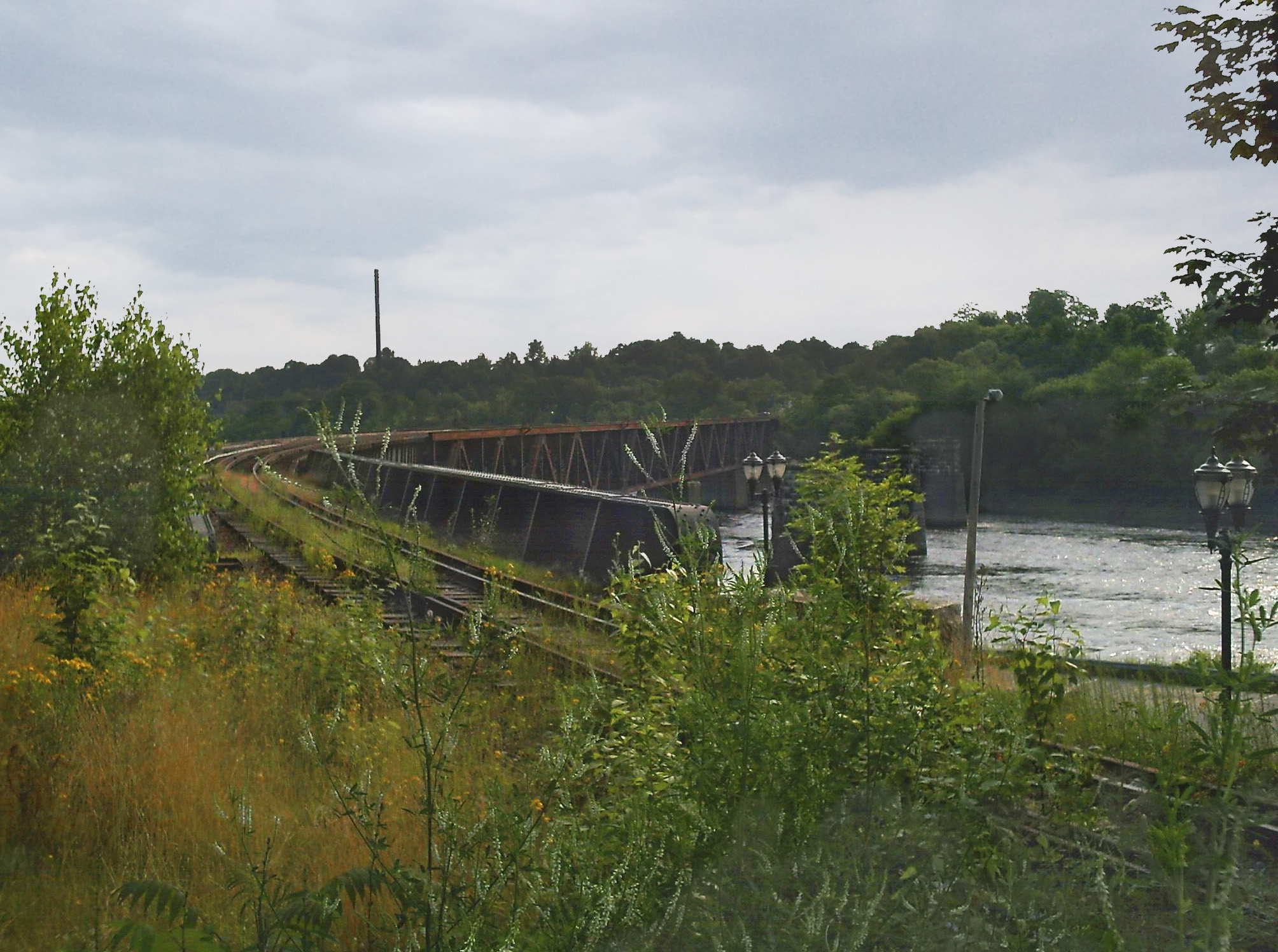
Former Somerset & Kennebec track over the Kennebec River near Augusta, Maine, July 8, 2006

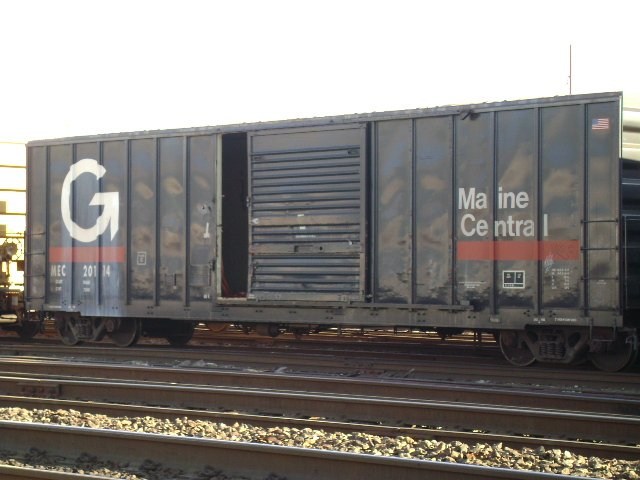
Maine Central boxcar in Guilford livery

One of the instigating factors which led to the labor strife at Guilford relates to a corporate reorganization at one of the company's former Maine Central properties. After the Calais Branch was abandoned, a small portion of trackage between Calais and Woodland remained in service to a pulp mill. It was joined to the rest of the North American rail network through a connection with the Canadian Pacific Railway at St. Stephen, New Brunswick, and operated through New Brunswick territory for several miles between Calais and Woodland. In order to avoid union agreements that the rest of the rail system was forced to follow, Guilford leased this operation to an obscure B&M subsidiary known as Springfield Terminal Railway, because shortlines operate under different federal rules. Eventually, the corporate reorganization under Springfield Terminal would extend to the full extent of Guilford operations, and attempting to run a class 1 under short line rules would lead to years of union troubles.

The former Maine Central locomotive shops in Waterville continue as Guilford's main repair shops.

In the early 1990s, Guilford ended its practice of putting the full "Maine Central" name on the long hoods of MEC locomotives. Instead, the locomotives would wear the "Guilford Rail System" moniker, with small "MEC" reporting marks underneath the cab windows.

On November 1, 2003, the Morristown and Erie Railway (M&E) took over the former Maine Central "Lower Road" (main line) and Rockland Branch routes (aided by significant public funding from the state Department of Transportation). M&E operated these state-owned lines as the Maine Eastern Railroad. Prior to M&E, the Rockland Branch had been operated by Safe Handling, and before that, the Maine Coast Railroad. In April 2025, the Cumberland & Knox Railroad, a subsidiary of Maine Switching Services, finalized its deal with the Maine Department of Transportation to operate the 56-mile Rockland Branch. Several railroad preservation and promotion groups are seeking to have the state-owned Calais Branch and Mountain Division routes reactivated for use by short line or tourist rail operations.

==== Pan Am Railways and CSX ====
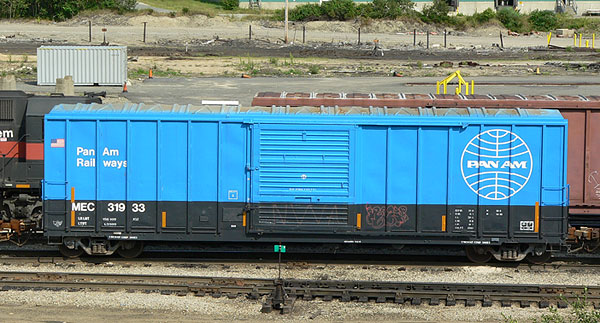
A former Maine Central boxcar painted in the new Pan Am Railways livery in 2005

In March 2006, Guilford Transportation Industries changed its name to Pan Am Railways (PAR), reflecting the purchase of Pan American World Airways brand in 1998. PAR began repainting locomotives in the sky-blue Pan Am colors shortly thereafter. Pan Am was acquired by CSX Corporation in 2022.

== Passenger operations ==
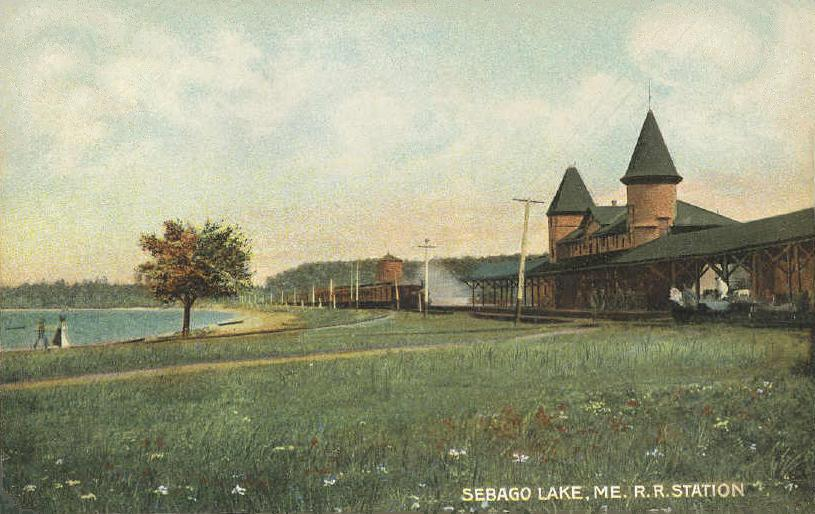
Passenger station in Standish, Maine, c. 1907

The MEC passenger trains, often advertised as "M.C. R.R." in the early 20th century, were essential to the sporting camp movement as early as the 1880s when people from Boston, New York, Philadelphia, and Detroit would make their way north to hunt and fish in the western mountains and the Maine North Woods. From Portland's Union Station, the MEC had unnamed trains to Bangor via Lewiston, to Bangor via Augusta, to Rockland, to Calais via Ellsworth, to Farmington and to Montreal via North Conway.

In 1908, the railroad established the Tacoma Inn at the junction of Woodbury Pond and Sand Pond on the Tacoma Lakes in Litchfield. In 1915, the Tacoma Inn hosted the High Diving White Horses, named King and Queen, who jumped from a high platform into Sand Pond. The railroad operated the inn until 1932.

Among the named trains operated by the MEC prior to ending passenger service in 1960 were the Bar Harbor Express, Down Easter, Flying Yankee, Gull, Katahdin, Kennebec, Mountaineer, Penobscot, Pine Tree, and Skipper. The Down Easter name is in use by Amtrak (now spelled Downeaster), which began passenger service between Boston and Brunswick, Maine, in 2001.

== Current operations ==
- Brunswick Branch
- Rumford Branch
- Calais Branch/Woodland Spur

== Abandoned ==
- Mountain Division
- Rockland Branch (now owned by MaineDOT and leased to Canadian Pacific Railway)
- Kineo Branch
- Calais Branch
- Bucksport Branch

== Preserved trackage ==
The Conway Scenic Railroad (reporting mark CSRX) is a heritage railroad in North Conway, New Hampshire, United States, owned by Profile Mountain Holdings Corp. The railroad operates over two historic railway routes: a line from North Conway to Conway that was formerly part of the Conway Branch of the Boston and Maine Railroad, and a line from North Conway through Crawford Notch to Fabyan that was once part of the Mountain Division of the Maine Central Railroad. The Conway line is owned by Conway Scenic, and the Mountain Division is owned by the State of New Hampshire.

== See also ==
- Maine Central Diesel Roster
- U18B
