= Maine's 7th State Senate district =

American legislative district

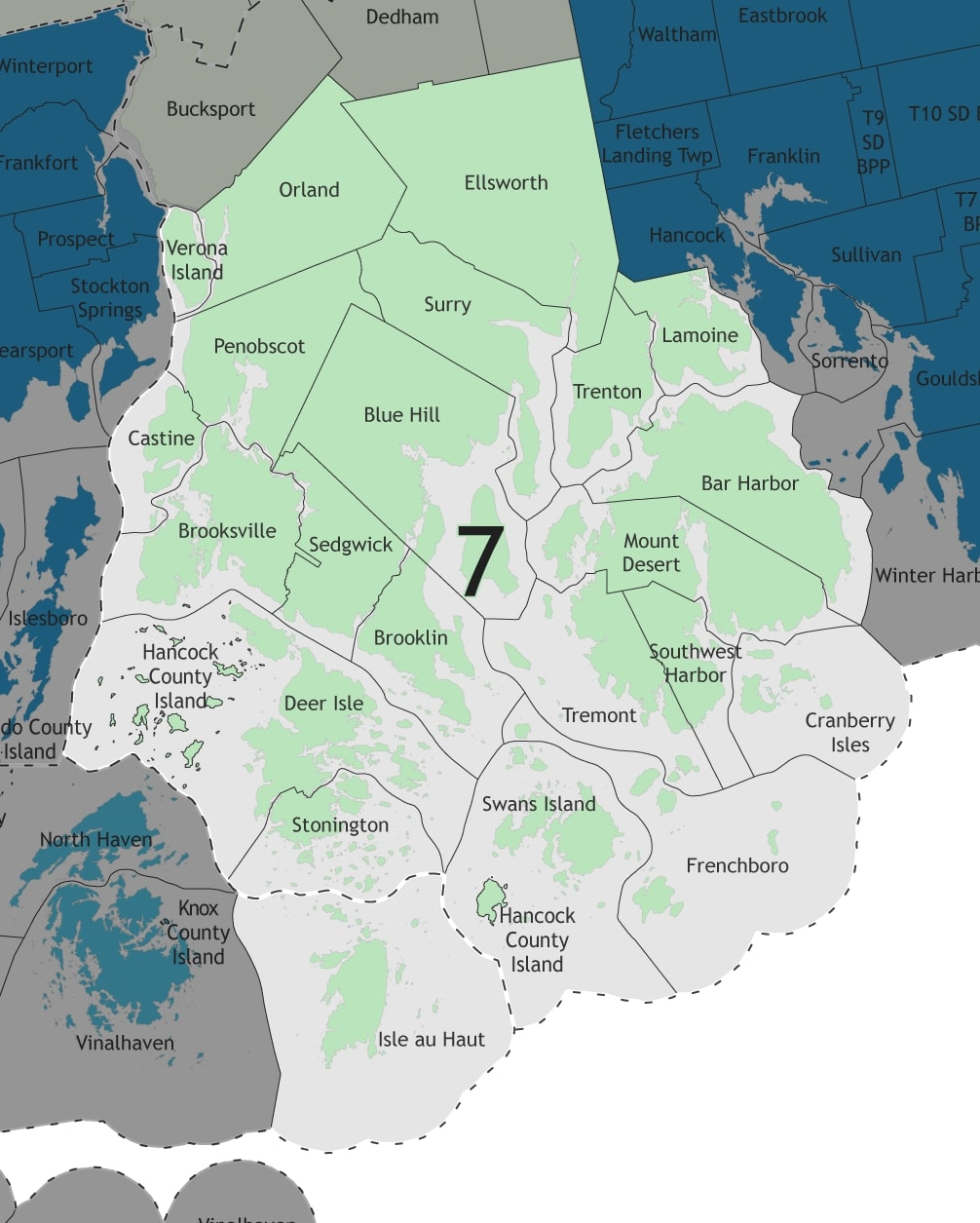
Senator
Nicole Grohoski; D–Ellsworth
- Registration: 41.1% Democratic; 25.2% Republican; 33.7% No party preference
- Population (2020): 38,183

Maine's 7th State Senate district is one of 35 districts in the Maine Senate. It has been represented by Democrat Nicole Grohoski since 2022.

== Geography ==
District 7 is made up of the southwestern corner of Hancock County.It also includes the town of Isle au Haut of Knox County.

Hancock County - 67.3% of county

Knox County - 0.2% of county

Hancock:

City:

- Ellsworth

Towns:

- Bar Harbor
- Blue Hill
- Brooklin
- Brooksville
- Castine
- Cranberry Isles
- Deer Isle
- Frenchboro
- Lamoine
- Mount Desert
- Orland
- Penobscot
- Sedgwick
- Southwest Harbor
- Surry
- Swans Island
- Tremont
- Trenton
- Verona Island

Knox:

Town:

- Isle au Haut

== Recent election results ==
=== 2022 - Special ===
2022 Maine State Senate special election, District 7
Party	Candidate	Votes	%
Democratic	Nicole Grohoski	6,506	63.4
Republican	Brian Langley	3,635	35.4
Green	Benjamin Meiklejohn	115	1.1
Total votes		10,256	100.0
Democratic hold			

Elections prior to 2022 were held under different district lines.

=== 2022 ===
2022 Maine State Senate election, District 7
Party	Candidate	Votes	%
Democratic	Nicole Grohoski	12,811	59
Republican	Brian Langley	8,913	41
Total votes		21,724	100.0
Democratic hold			

=== 2024 ===
2024 Maine State Senate election, District 7
Party	Candidate	Votes	%
Democratic	Nicole Grohoski	15,962	62
Republican	Sherman Hitchens	9,606	38
Total votes		25,298	100.0
Democratic hold			

== Historical election results ==
=== 2012 ===
2012 Maine State Senate election, District 7
Party	Candidate	Votes	%
Democratic	Rebecca Millett	13,950	64.2
Republican	Michael Wallace	7,788	35.8
Total votes		21,738	100

=== 2014 ===
2014 Maine State Senate election, District 7
Party	Candidate	Votes	%
Republican	Brian Langley	10,384	53.2
Democratic	Theodore Koffman	8,458	43.3
Blank votes	None	674	3.5
Total votes		19,517	100
Republican gain from Democratic			

=== 2016 ===
2016 Maine State Senate election, District 7
Party	Candidate	Votes	%
Republican	Brian Langley	13,218	55.8
Democratic	Moira O'Neill	10,476	44.2
Total votes		23,694	100
Republican hold			

=== 2018 ===
2018 Maine State Senate election, District 7
Party	Candidate	Votes	%
Democratic	Louis Luchini	13,361	64.1
Republican	Richard Malaby	7,486	35.9
Total votes		20,849	100
Democratic gain from Republican			

=== 2020 ===
2020 Maine State Senate election, District 7
Party	Candidate	Votes	%
Democratic	Louis Luchini	14,280	55
Republican	Brian Langley	11,672	45
Total votes		25,952	100
Democratic hold			
