= Hancock County Jail =

- U.S. National Register of Historic Places
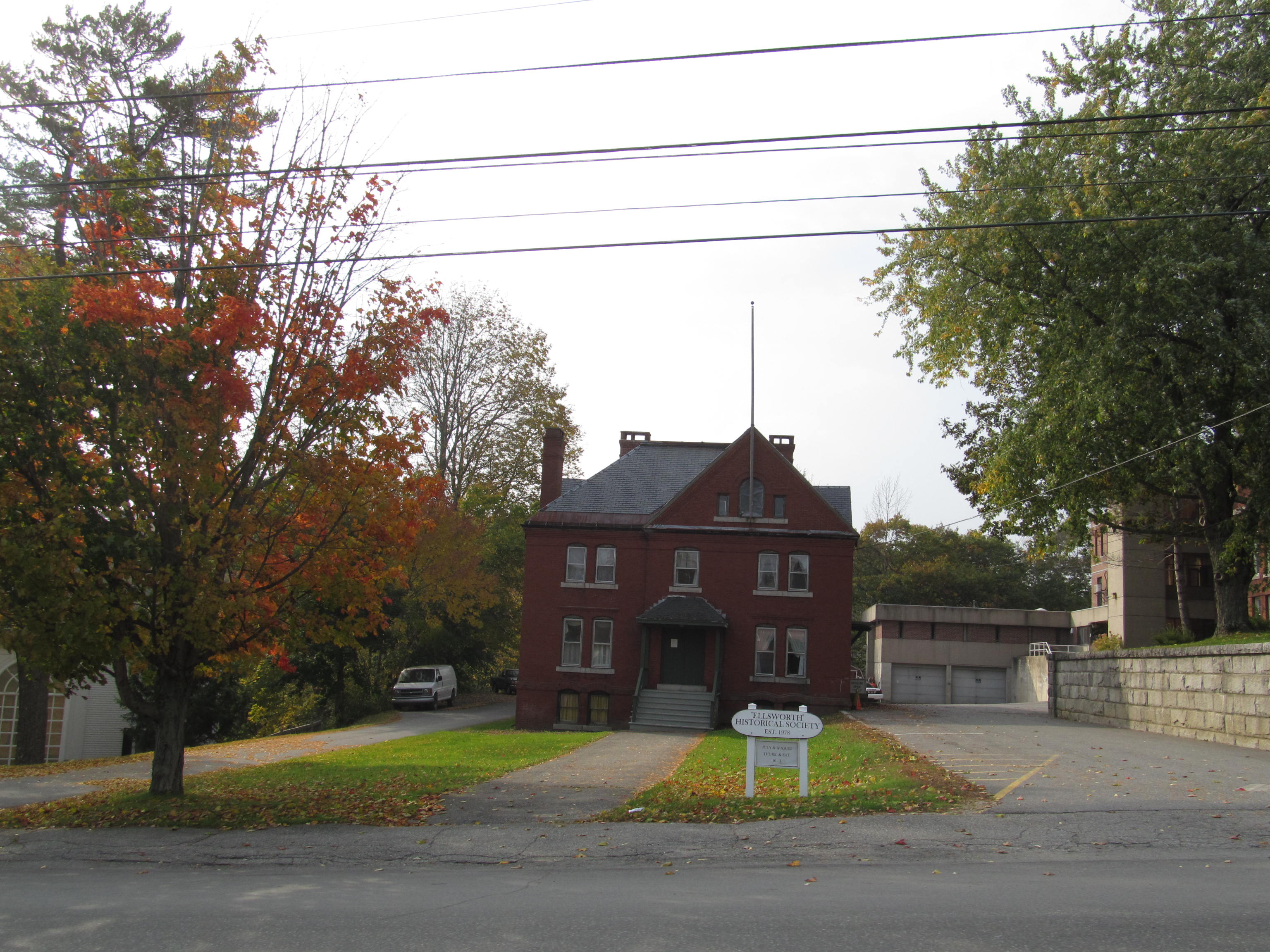

- Location within Maine Location within the United States
- Location: 40 State St., Ellsworth, Maine
- Coordinates: 44°32′32″N 68°25′34″W
- Area: 0.1 acres (0.040 ha)
- Built: 1885
- Built by: J & J Philbrook
- Architect: Francis H. Fassett
- Architectural style: Queen Anne, Renaissance
- NRHP reference No.: 07001445
- Added to NRHP: January 24, 2008

The former Hancock County Jail is located at 40 State Street in Ellsworth, the county seat of Hancock County, Maine, United States. Built in 1885–86, it has a well-appointed living space for the jailer in the front, and a series of cells in the back. It was operated as a jail until the early 1970s, and is now home to the Ellsworth Historical Society, which operates it as a museum. It was listed on the National Register of Historic Places in 2008 for its architectural and historical significance.

== Description and history ==
The former Hancock County Jail is on the west side of State Street, between the Hancock County Courthouse to the north and the Ellsworth Public Library to the south. Its lot is bounded on the west by the Union River. The jail is a 2 1/2-story brick and granite building, with a dormered hip roof and a slightly elevated granite foundation. The front facade is five bays wide, with the three on the right projecting slightly and topped by a large gable. The outer bays consists of closely spaced pairs of windows, while that in the center has the main entry and a single sash window above. The gable has a Palladian window outlined in a brick arch. On the north and south facades the distinction between the jailer's residence (the front) and the jail portion (the rear) of the building is evident.

The interior of the jailer's residence has a central hall plan, with four major rooms on each floor, and a central stairwell with an elegantly turned railing and newel post. The parlor and dining room are well-appointed, with decorative fireplace surrounds. The room at the northwest served as the jailer's office, and has a separate entrance to the outside and access to the jail through a heavy metal door. Other rooms at the back of the residence also have "wicket" openings, coverable by heavy metal fixtures, through which the jailer could monitor and communicate with the prisoners. The rear of the building has thick granite exterior walls, and houses fourteen cells divided by brick walls. The cells are 6 by 10 feet (1.8 m × 3.0 m), with 8-foot (2.4 m) ceilings.

The jail was the second built for the county. The county hired Portland architect Francis H. Fassett to draft plans in 1885, and the building was completed the following year. It is one of several surviving county jails in Maine which include both cells and jailer's quarters. The facility served as a jail until the early 1970s; it is not known how many jailers or county sheriffs resided in the jailer's quarters, due in part to the destruction of county records by a fire at the adjacent courthouse in 1933. The last county sheriff prior to the jail's closure converted the office into an evidence locker, and did not live on the premises.

The building is now home to the Ellsworth Historical Society, which rescued it from demolition in 1980. The museum is generally open on Thursdays and Saturdays in July and August, or by appointment.

== See also ==
- National Register of Historic Places listings in Hancock County, Maine
