= Maine Central 470 =

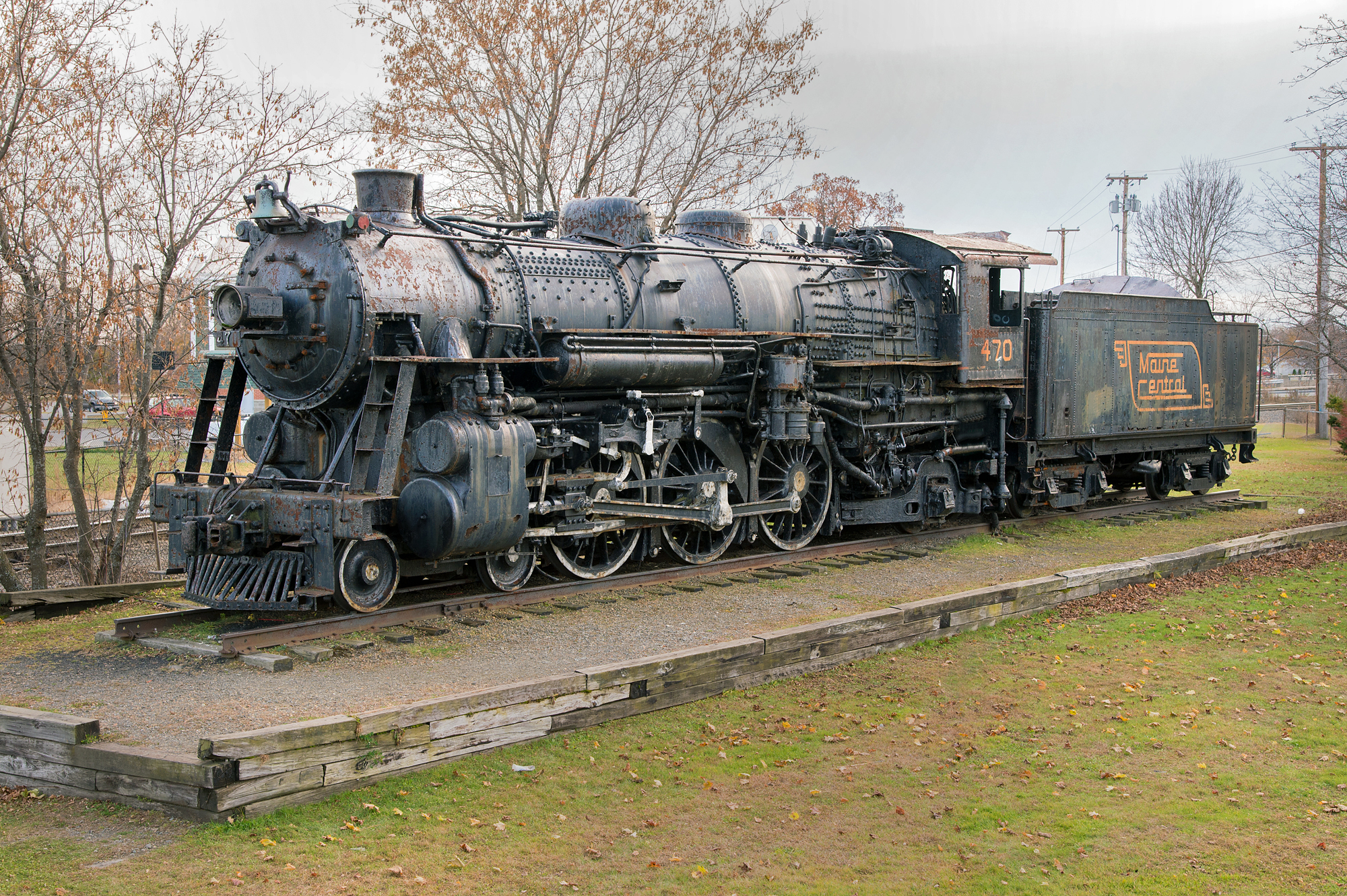
- Maine Central 470 on static display in Waterville, Maine, in September 2013
Type and origin
- Power type: Steam
- Builder: American Locomotive Company (Schenectady Works)
- Serial number: 65555
- Build date: May 1924
- Rebuild date: 1933
Specifications
- Configuration
  - Whyte: 4-6-2
  - UIC: 2′C1′
- Gauge: 4 ft 8 1/2 in (1,435 mm)
- Leading dia.: 33 in (0.838 m)
- Driver dia.: 73 in (1.854 m)
- Trailing dia.: 46 in (1.168 m)
- Length: 75 ft 0 in (22.86 m)
- Height: 14 ft 7 1/2 in (4.46 m)
- Loco weight: 280,600 lb (127.3 tonnes)
- Tender weight: 190,800 lb (86.5 tonnes)
- Total weight: 471,400 lb (213.8 tonnes)
- Fuel type: Coal
- Fuel capacity: 26,000 lb (12 tonnes)
- Water cap.: 9,200 US gal (35,000 L; 7,700 imp gal)
- Firebox
  - Grate area: 56.5 sq ft (5.25 m^{2})
- Boiler pressure: 195 lbf/in^{2} (1.34 MPa)
- Heating surface
  - Firebox: 311.7 sq ft (28.96 m^{2})
  - Tubes and flues: 2,664.8 sq ft (247.57 m^{2})
  - Total surface: 3,033 sq ft (281.8 m^{2})
- Superheater
  - Heating area: 636 sq ft (59.1 m^{2})
- Cylinders: Two, outside
- Cylinder size: 24 in × 28 in (610 mm × 711 mm)
- Valve gear: Baker
- Valve type: Piston valves
- Loco brake: Air
- Train brakes: Air
- Couplers: Knuckle
Performance figures
- Tractive effort: 47,700 lbf (212.18 kN)(With Booster)
Career
- Operators: Maine Central Railroad
- Class: C-3
- Number in class: 5th of 5
- Nicknames: Old 470
- Locale: Maine
- Delivered: May 1924
- Last run: June 13, 1954
- Retired: June 17, 1954
- Preserved: October 28, 1962
- Current owner: New England Steam Corporation
- Disposition: Undergoing restoration to operating condition
- Specifications are following a Class C-3 Modification. 1933

Maine Central 470 is a 4-6-2 "Pacific" type steam locomotive, built by the American Locomotive Company (ALCO) in May 1924 for the Maine Central Railroad (MEC). Currently owned by the New England Steam Corporation, it is being restored to operating condition at Washington Junction in Hancock, Maine.

== History ==
=== Revenue service and retirement ===
In the early 1920s, passenger traffic was rising on the Maine Central Railroad (MEC), particularly for stops between Boston, Massachusetts, and Bangor, Maine, and so the railroad was buying larger and more powerful engines to boost capacity and speed. Among them was the American Locomotive Company's popular 4-6-2s, which ALCO vigorously promoted to the railroads, especially in the passenger-dense East Coast.

In May 1924, ALCO's plant in Schenectady, New York, produced the locomotive designated as builder's number 65555. MEC bought the locomotive for $62,296.90 (the equivalent of ±$839,000 in present-day U.S. dollars) and numbered it 470. Delivery was expected during the summer of 1924.

During its 30 years of service, No. 470 pulled named passenger trains including The Gull, the Bar Harbor Express, and the Kennebec Limited.

The engine was the last steam locomotive to be operated by Maine Central Railroad. Its final run on Sunday, June 13, 1954, was nationally publicized and attracted widespread spectators along the route. Passenger service had been in steady decline, and Maine Central discontinued all passenger service in Maine six years later.

After its final run, Engine No. 470 was transferred to the Railroad's Maintenance Shops in Waterville where it was drained, winterized and towed to a display plinth near the public railroad station on June 17, 1954. On October 28, 1962, in celebrating Maine Central Railroad's centennial anniversary, the locomotive was presented as a gift to the City of Waterville.

=== Sale and restoration ===
In 2012, after being exposed to the elements and subsequent hazard to the public, the City of Waterville requested bids for the sale or restoration of the No. 470 locomotive. Of the six bids that were received, only one bidder planned to keep the locomotive in Maine.

On December 3, 2013, the City Council of Waterville voted to sell the No. 470 locomotive to the Maine-based non-profit New England Steam Corporation (NESCo), which entered a delayed purchase and sale agreement with the city, vowing not to disturb the locomotive until it had raised the purchase price and the anticipated moving costs. On November 5, 2015, the NESCo purchased No. 470 for $25,000 and prepared to move it to the Downeast Scenic Railroad in Ellsworth, Maine.

Between July and August 2016, NESCo moved No. 470 to Washington Junction in Hancock, Maine. In cooperation with the Downeast Scenic Railroad, they plan a complete restoration, returning the No. 470 locomotive to operating service. That effort is now underway; a new tender cistern and coal bunker were placed on the tender frame on November 13, 2022. The nonprofit has spent more than $500,000 on the restoration, with an estimate of a total cost of $2 million in finishing the project.

== See also ==
- Atlanta and West Point 290
- Atlantic Coast Line 1504
- Boston and Maine 3713
- Florida East Coast 153
- Norfolk and Western 578
- Pennsylvania Railroad 1361
- Reading and Northern 425
- Southern Pacific 2467
- Southern Pacific 2472
- Southern Pacific 2479
- Southern Railway 1401
- U.S. Sugar 148
