= Mary Agnes Tincker =

American novelist

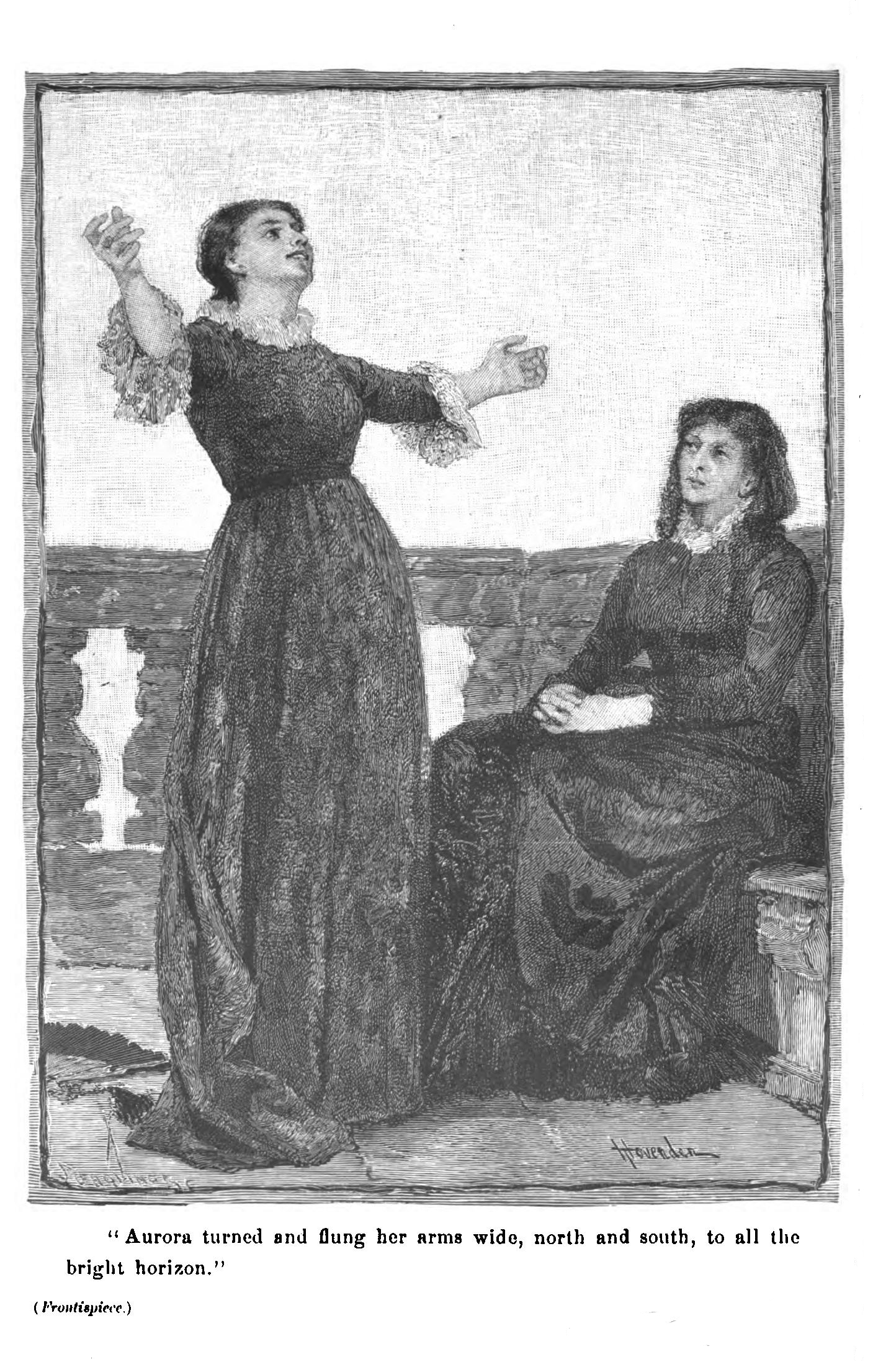
Frontispiece from The Jewel in the Lotos by Thomas Hovenden 1884.

Mary Agnes Tincker (July 18, 1833 – December 4, 1907) was an American novelist. She published about a dozen novels and many short stories. She was made a member of the Ancient Academy of Arcadia of Rome, and of the American Academy of Political and Social Science, Philadelphia.

== Life and works ==
Tincker was born in Ellsworth, Maine, daughter of Richard Tinker and Mehitable Jellison; descendant of Thomas Tinker, of the Mayflower, and of Benjamin Jellison, a Presbyterian, of Scots, Irish and English extraction, who was an extensive land-owner in Maine and Canada, but, having adhered to the Loyalist cause during the revolution, his estate was confiscated. He then settled on a grant of land in New Brunswick, where he began life anew. Mary Tincker's father was deputy sheriff and subsequently high sheriff of Hancock County, and at the time of his death was warden of the Maine state prison. She was educated at the high-school in Ellsworth, and at the academy in Blue Hill, Maine. At the age of thirteen she began teaching in the public schools. At fifteen her first literary work was printed. Her father was a prosperous Congregational farmer but his daughter was so shocked by an incident in which a Roman Catholic priest was tarred-and-feathered by a mob of Know-Nothing agitators, that she converted to Roman Catholicism in protest at the age of twenty.

=== Civil War ===
In 1863, she procured a recommendation from Governor John A. Andrew of Massachusetts as a volunteer nurse for the wounded of the Civil War, and served in ward 6, Judiciary Square Hospital, at Washington, D. C., until she herself fell ill. On her recovery, making her residence in Boston, she was there wholly engrossed in journalistic and literary work. Short stories from her pen appeared in the early numbers of The Catholic World. During this period she wrote her earliest novels, "The House of Yorke" and " Grapes and Thorns," both of which were in the fourth edition in 1872, and "A Winged World, and other Sketches" (1873).

=== Europe ===
In 1873 she went to Europe, where she remained fourteen years visiting France, England and Spain. She resided in Italy many years, and immersed herself in the language and customs. She had many expatriate American friends, whom she used as inspiration in some of her novels, a practice of which they did not always approve. (Note: From The Literary World, Vol 12 (1881): "— No book published in Boston, this long time, has made more talk than Miss Tincker's By the Tiber, which we review elsewhere. That it is a personal matter has been taken for granted in some quarters, and a long communication in the Boston Advertiser, severely censuring the author for showing up real people under thin disguises, must have made the publishers chuckle. In particular, this writer associates the "Miss Cromo" of the book with Miss Anne Hampton Brewster, an American lady resident in Rome, whose letters to the Advertiser have long been a feature of that paper.") Much time was spent in Assisi and Palestrina. It was followed by Grapes and Thorns (1873–74) and Six Sunny Months (1876–77). The latter was the first fruit of her sojourn in Italy (1873–1887).

=== Rise to prominence ===
"Six Sunny Months" was written in Italy in 1878, and " Signor Monaldini's Niece " in 1879. (Note: The following appeared in The Literary World, Vol. 10 (1879): "TABLE TALK". . . The Author of “Signor Monaldini's Niece." Her name is not "Harriet," but Mary Agnes; and not "Tinker," but Tincker. That she went to Rome to live about six years ago, is true; but that "she was there converted to the Roman Catholic Church," is hardly correct. The change in her religious views took place more than twenty years ago, about the time of the Know-Nothing excitement, while she was living in Ellsworth, Maine. For a little while after that, until a permanent teacher could lie found, she taught a school of Catholic children whom their parents thought the politico-religious excitement of the time had caused to be ill-used in the public schools. Upon the death of her father, her mother being already dead, Miss Tincker fell to writing for a livelihood, and some of her early stories were published in Harper's and Putnam's Magazines. Much of her work appeared under a pseudonym. During the war, she was sent to Washington by Gov. Andrew of Massachusetts, and there she nursed the soldiers in the Columbia Hospital and at the Barracks in Judiciary Square. Several of her works which preceded Signor Monaldini's Niece have appeared in book form, among which are The House of Yorke, Grapes and Thorns, and Six Sunny Months. Referring to her literary work, the following extract is of interest. It is from a letter written by Miss Tincker at Assisi, Italy, July 18, 1879, to a friend in this city: “My chief encouragement to write came from an editor of the Atlantic when it was published by Phillips, Sampson & Co. I do not know who he was, but I can yet repeat almost all his letter by heart. He rejected the article I sent — it was intended as the initial one of a series — telling me that I was on the wrong track, but he encouraged me to write. "You cannot fail to win success," he said. I have often wished that I might be able to thank him for that note, for I was young, poor, helpless, and discouraged, when it came to me, and it helped me then and afterward. Through all the trash that I have had to write for bread, and which I repudiate as my real work, I have always had a vision of something worthier to be done if ever the time should come when I could stop to do it. The time has never come. Signor Monaldini's Niece was written under the same desperate pressure, and half of it was not copied at all. As for the criticisms of it, I almost agree with them; the praises astonish me. The episode of Miss Conroy is unpleasant, but I am not sure that I did wrong in writing it, though perhaps I did. I have always thought that poor ladies who have neither husbands nor homes are cruelly treated by the world. My experience as a member of that society is full of examples of coarseness, reaching almost to brutality, in people calling themselves "ladies," "gentlemen," and "Christians," examples which I shall never forget, and which I recall with an almost incredulous astonishment. Of course I have had beautiful examples of opposite characteristics, but they have been as rare as carbone bianco. My idea in Miss Conroy was to show what such circumstances might lead to with some persons, and those not the worst in the world, and I wanted her to speak for herself. Of course she will be condemned by most. I only pity her. As to the ending of the story — that the majority of readers are responsible for. I knew that Camilla should die. She was and is dead in my mind. In my first sketch of the last chapter, she was carried down to the Duomo at midnight, and she never came back. But, as my pen in copying reached that point, I recollected—people like a story to end well, they don't like to be made sad—the publishers, if I find any, will say, etc., etc. My clamorous rent came in, all my needs of money found voice and threatened mc: “You will fail if you leave the readers with tears in their eyes." Well, I sighed, and submitted. I galvanized an image of my poor, pretty Camilla and sat a company of shadowy monks saying a Te Deum for her, and a shadowy lover embracing her; while, slipping out into the moonlight, my real Cappucini went bearing their burden down between the olive trees and murmuring a De profundis, which no one heard but Don Filippo and me. It was the mournfulness of that true ending that made me call the story "The Hall of Cypresses," which the publishers changed to its present title." Miss Tincker, never of robust health, went to Assisi last spring, after a severe illness of several months, in the hope, which has been fulfilled, of regaining something of her usual strength. Even while writing Signer Monaldini’s Niece, she was an invalid and obliged to lie in bed for a considerable part of each day. Norman C. Perkins, The literary world, Vol. 10 (1879)) The latter was published both in England and America, and immediately called forth such universal approbation from the critics and the reading world that she found herself famous overnight. By the Tiber (1881), (Note: From The Literary World, Vol 12 (1881): By the Tiber, (1881) Roberts Brothers, $1.50.; "Our readers generally are familiar with the history of the "No Name Novels," that series of anonymous stories which Roberts Brothers, of Boston, have been publishing at intervals during the past two or three years. One of the ablest and best of the series was Signor Monaldini's Niece, a picture of Roman life, which appeared in 1879. Its author proved to be a Miss Mary Agnes Tincker, formerly of Ellsworth, Me., who had become a Roman Catholic and taken up her abode in Rome. A sketch of her appeared in the Literary World of Sept. 27> 1879. Miss Tincker has now published through the same hands, but outside of the "No Name" series, another novel called By the Tiber. By the Tiber is a dramatic and powerful work detailing the experiences of a Penobscot girl, Valeria Ellsworth, in Rome. Miss Ellsworth is represented as an author and a Roman Catholic, who has established herself in the Eternal City because of its varied fascinations for her religious and aesthetic nature. She quickly becomes a prominent figure in a group of Italians, and of foreigners resident in Rome, among whom are several strongly drawn types of manhood and womanhood, agreeable and disagreeable — counts, countesses, and cardinals; a Miss Cromo, who is a most unpleasant American, a Miss Pendleton, a Miss Chaplin, a Mr. Willis, and so on. Miss Ellsworth has an individuality of her own, and friction is soon excited between her and her surroundings, the dire results of which are precipitated by a domestic tragedy of which she becomes the unintentional witness. For, tired of the jealousies and bickerings of the circle with which she is at first connected, Miss Ellsworth has taken an apartment in a dwelling overlooking the gardens of the Count and Countess Belvedere. The Countess Belvedere, a seductive and unprincipled woman, has a guilty intrigue with her bright-faced gardener, Vittorio, himself an illegitimate son of an Italian noble; and of their secret meetings in the garden Valeria finds herself a hidden spectator. The revelation of such perfidy under her very windows is a severe shock to her nervous system. By-and-by there is a mysterious midnight encounter in the garden, an indistinguishable figure is stabbed to death, and the bleeding body is hustled into a hasty grave at the foot of the wall. All this, too, Valeria sees, and the effect of it is to throw her into a violent fever. Now come her real trials. After what has happened, the Countess, it would seem, is suspicious of the American lodger in the apartment overlooking the garden, and a course of intolerable persecution is begun, with the aim of driving her away. But Valeria will not be driven. In time this plot finds support in the American colony, the impression being made that Miss Cromo and others are bought up by the Countess Belvedere in behalf of her effort to get rid of witnesses and obliterate evidence. When at last Valeria falls ill and her fever runs into delirium, a plan is contrived by Miss Cromo to get her into an insane asylum; and this, by deceitful means, is made successful. Valeria becomes an inmate of the Villa Barberini. In time she recovers, but only to find herself a prisoner, with no possibility of release, except she will leave Rome. The story ends, leaving her Apparently in this hopeless incarceration. It is a tragic, passionate, pitiful, powerful tale, abounding with the most exquisite glimpses of Italian landscape, fiery with indignation and invective towards personal wrong, tender with a woman's heart of love and beauty, fervid in its homage toward Pope and priest and church, rough and biting in its scorn for social hypocrisies and meanness. There are really two stories intertwined — the misfortunes of Valeria and the romance of Vittorio. The latter gives a rich color of its own to the book. The handsome Vittorio, Marco his father, Rosa his sister, and the whole picture of Italian peasant life in which they are the central figures, furnish a beautifully artistic element; while the interviews between Vittorio and the Countess in the garden, and between each of them successively with the Cardinal after their secret is discovered, are managed with consummate skill. Bruno's flight after the murder of Vittorio, and Marco's night of grief in the boat on the Mediterranean, are described with an intensity of effect worthy of Victor Hugo. The gossips are very busy, as we write, with the question whether this book is autobiographical. That it is written out of real life, we cannot question. Moreover, there are passages in it so incoherent, it is marked by such sudden transitions from style to style, as to suggest a mind which has been sorely overwrought at some time, if not brought into a condition of abnormal excitement. But, whatever its foundation and history, it is a most remarkable work; like one of Turner's landscapes, tempestuous, lurid, glowing, dashed with both spray and sunshine; as worthy of being read as any novel of the past twelve-month, and destined to make a sensation, whether truth or imagination.") The Jewel in the Lotus (1884); (Note: From Literary World, Vol 14 (1883): The Jewel in the Lotus, "Miss Tincker's new novel perhaps is not a great work of fiction, nor can it be regarded as quite the equal, in an artistic sense, of her first work, Signor MonaldinPs Niece; but the book is one the reading of which brings refreshment to the wearied reviewer. There is not a dull page in it. The story, though the simplest, is at the farthest remove from the commonplace and trivial; it is elevated and beautiful throughout by the presence of a Christian spirit and a rich imagination. The recondite, and as it may be thought, fantastic title of the book, is suggestive of the high motive inspiring the author's work and of the influence she would fain have it exert. The distinctly religious tendency of Miss Tincker's latest writing has nothing of sectarianism in it. Her Roman Catholicism has rationalized and broadened itself so that little now is left of it that is not pure Christianity. Some readers will be likely to say that her literary art has suffered from the intrusion of this new element, and that such chapters as that in which Glenlyon and Father Segneri discuss the errors of Romanism mar the artistic completeness of the fiction. Be that as it may, the author writes a/ter a clear theory of her own as to the duties of the novelist. "We lay great stress on the early education of children [she says by the mouth of Father Segneri] but the poet and the novelist appeal to the undying child in the heart of man. When they are bad they can go back, under the years, to the child's heart and smooth out all traces of early virtuous teaching. When they are good, they recall and strengthen the early aspirations in every heart that was ever capable of aspiring. . . . Let us use the same weapons for truth that others use for falsehood, and let us not undervalue them. If Aurora wishes to be a poetess, let her sing, since she has a religious mind and a good heart." This girl-poet, Aurora Coronari, with the starry eyes and the beautiful soul, is in one sense scarcely so prominent a figure as others in the story, and yet she is felt continually as the bright pervading presence of the whole. It is a lovely picture, that of the fine old man Glenlyon between the two fresh, young shapes of Aurelia and Aurora, "morning-gold and morning-red." The English girl, with her passionless nature, her cool gentleness, her tranquil affectionateness, is a very delicately-contrived foil to the Italian girl whose soul is all one pure, ardent flame of enthusiasm for the beautiful and true. "There's the balance of a bird, and the balance of a sensible girl," said Glenlyon. "Aurora has both; and both together make the balance of an angel, I should say. I hardly like that way of judging people, sister. Nothing is better balanced than a four-legged stool. Aurelia is a sweet woman; so is this Italian girl; and she is a poet besides." The episode of Aurelia's entanglement with Don Leopoldo furnishes that melodramatic element which none of Miss Tincker's novels has been without, but which in her hands escapes degeneration into coarse sensationalism, being always more or less in keeping with the Italian scenes and characters of her books. Moreover, in this case, it serves a purpose in making us like Aurelia the better for her temporary aberration from the way of calm, self-regarding discretion Miss Tincker's character-painting is never blotchy or vague; her personages, both principal and subordinate ones, are invariably sketched with a perfect, and fine decision of outline. Every one in this novel, from Glenlyon to the servants in the kitchen, has his separate and rounded individuality. Even Mrs. Armandale, who appears but once to say a few words, is discriminated with one sharp, clear stroke. "She was rather pretty, had an air of conscious elegance and beatitude, and was a good sort of woman, though rather frothy." The sketch of the American heiress is notably spirited, without exaggeration. To draw every-day people well is however a less difficult task than to paint an Aurora. Miss Tincker is an idealist who in these days of realism is not afraid to conceive according to the inspiration of her own poetic genius, and the exquisite simplicity and delicacy with which the person of the young Italian girl is put before us is proof of her artistic strength. The novel is full of beautiful pictures, and has certain passages we should be glad to quote, such as that descriptive of a brigand's religious faith, on page 72; but we must be content to leave these to the reader to discover.") Aurora (1885), were all written at this time and won her great fame. The Catholic World, trying to downplay the scandalous reception of some of her books from this time, wrote, "They reflected, for the most part, the beauty of Italy."

The Two Coronets (1887); (Note: SYNOPSIS: Two Coronets (1889). "Beatrice Giorgini, an Italian contessa whose parents contract a secret marriage, an unequal match as to birth and fortune, and, dying young, one by violence, leave their child in charge of Betta, a faithful nurse, who takes her to her mother's mother, an old peasant. At her grandmother's death she becomes companion to a relative of her father; marries don Leonardo, her father's cousin and one of the witnesses to the secret marriage, and uses him to prove her legitimacy and his own treachery.") and San Salvador (1889), were written after she returned to America and also sold well.

=== Translations ===
Her Grapes and Thorns was translated into French by the Marchioness of San Carlos de Pedroso, (Note: The author of Les Américains chex eux (1890) ("Americans At Home"). She was American born but spent most of her life in France. She married a Spanish marquès, thereby acquiring the title, Madame la Marquise de San Carlos de Pedrano. The Atlantic monthly, Vol 66, reviewed her book in 1890, not realizing that she was an American expatriate and praised her perception as an "unbiased foreigner." She also ran a "finishing school" in Paris for the daughters of the wealthy.) By the Tiber into German by Baroness Butler, and Two Coronets, by Heusel.

=== Last book ===
Her last book, fittingly called Autumn Leaves, was issued in 1898, and contained matter contributed not long before to The Catholic World. Tincker died in Boston.

== Bibliography ==
- The House of Yorke (1872)
- A Winged Word (1873), and other sketches and stories, The Catholic Publication Society
- Grapes and Thorns; or, A Priest's Sacrifice (1874)
- By the Tiber (1881) Roberts Bros.
- The Jewel in the Lotos (1884) J.B. Lippincott & Co.
- San Salvador (1878)
- Signor Monaldini's Niece (1879)
- Two Coronets (1889) Houghton, Mifflin & Company
- Aurora (1890)
- The Life Beyond (1892), (Note: From: The Life Beyond(1892) "But I followed a frog just now, as he went upwards, and all at once he went to the side of the water, and began to disappear, and presently he was gone. Did he leave this world, do you think? And what can there be beyond ?") adapted from the work of Margaret Gatty
- Autumn leaves (1899)

=== Short stories ===
- "Sister Sylvia" (1900) in Stories by American Authors, Scribner & Sons (short story)
- "From the Garden of a Friend"
- "Six Sunny Months, And Other Stories" (1878)
