= Ellsworth Public Library =

Library in Ellsworth, Maine

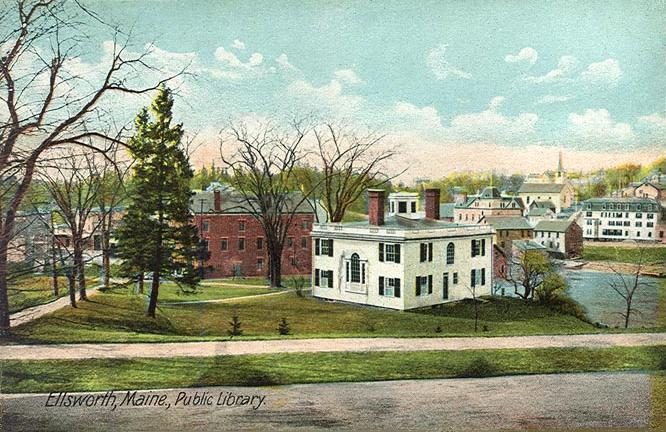
- Location: Ellsworth, Maine, United States
- Type: Public
- Established: 1897

Collection
- Size: 41,000

Access and use
- Circulation: 162,000
- Population served: 7,741

Other information
- Budget: $650,579
- Employees: 9
- Website: www.ellsworth.lib.me.us
- Col. Meltiah Jordan House; Ellsworth Public Library
- U.S. National Register of Historic Places
- Location: 20 State St., Ellsworth, Maine
- Coordinates: 44.542222°N 68.425556°W
- NRHP reference No.: 74000154
- Added to NRHP: August 13, 1974

The Ellsworth Public Library is the public library serving Ellsworth, Maine. It is located at 20 State Street in the city's central business district in a historically and architecturally significant Federal style house built in 1817, that was listed on the National Register of Historic Places in 1974.

== History ==
The Federal-style building was built in 1817 by Colonel Meltiah Jordan and is commonly known as the Tisdale House after Seth Tisdale, one of its owners. The house has been a public library since 1897 when George Nixon Black gave the remodeled building to the City of Ellsworth with the enduring condition "That the premises conveyed shall be always used for a public library."

A three-story addition, designed by Bingham & Woodward and financed by a municipal bond issued by the City of Ellsworth, was completed in 1991.

== Architecture ==
The library is set facing roughly southeast on the west side of State Street (between it and the Union River), just south of the old Hancock County Jail (now a historical society museum), and across the street from Ellsworth City Hall. It is a two story wood frame structure, with a low hip roof topped by an octagonal cupola and ringed by a low balustrade. The walls are sheathed in clapboards. The front facade is five bays wide with a center entrance sheltered by a Greek Revival portico supported by four fluted Doric columns and topped by a low balustrade. The right side facade is dominated by a large Palladian window that fills the center bay. There are pilasters at the corners of the building. The house was built in 1817 by Colonel Meltiah Jordan for his son Benjamin.

The house was listed on the National Register of Historic Places (as the "Col. Meltiah Jordan House") in 1974.

== See also ==
- National Register of Historic Places listings in Hancock County, Maine
