= Louis Luchini =

American politician and long-distance runner

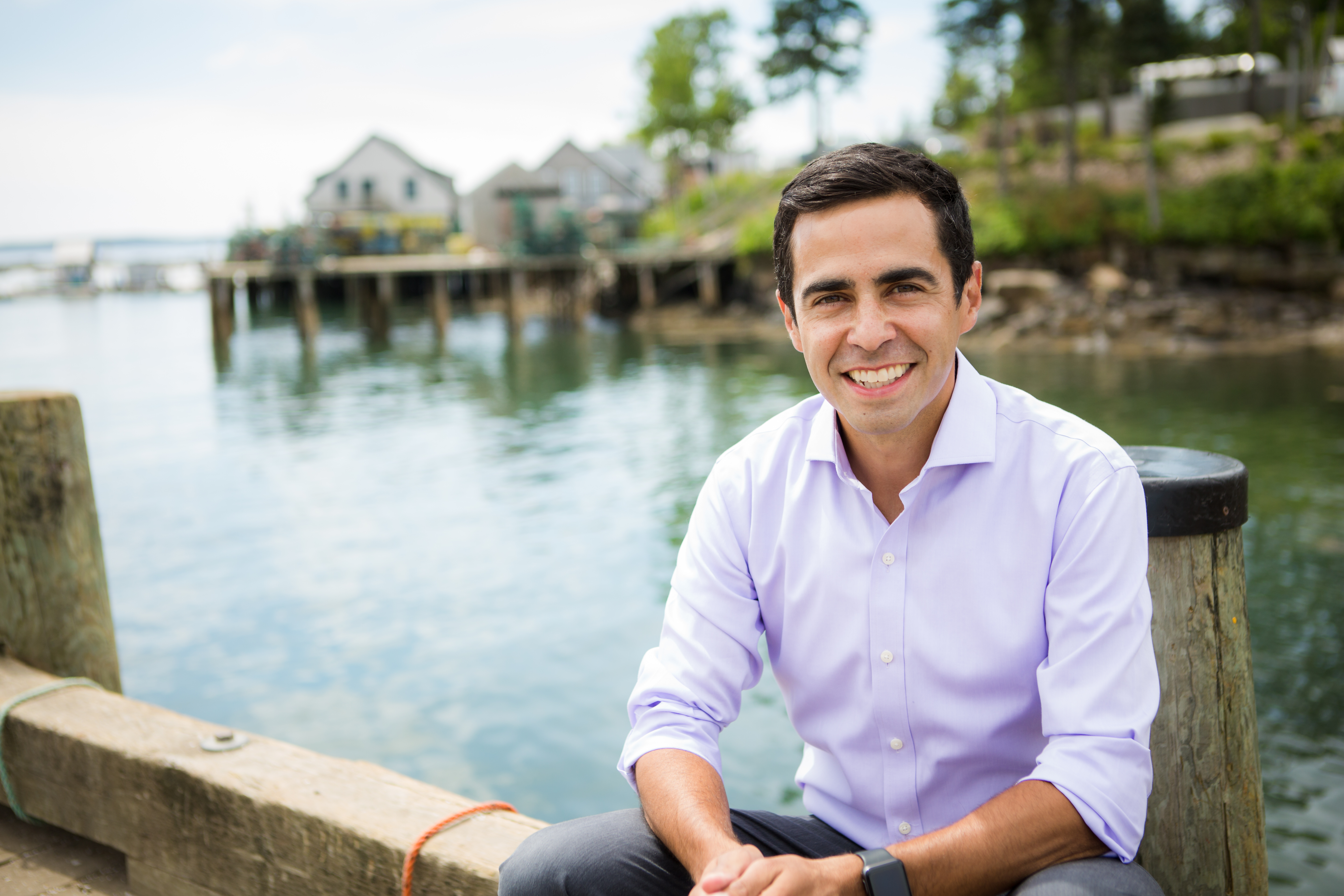

Member of the Maine Senate from the 7th district
- In office December 5, 2018 – January 18, 2022
- Preceded by: Brian Langley
- Succeeded by: Nicole Grohoski

Member of the Maine House of Representatives from the 38th & 132nd district
- In office December 2010 – December 2018
- Preceded by: Brian Langley
- Succeeded by: Nicole Grohoski

Personal details
- Born: May 24, 1981 (age 45) Ellsworth, Maine
- Party: Democratic
- Education: Stanford University
- Occupation: Professional runner, high school cross-country coach
- Website: https://luchini.mainecandidate.com/

Louis Luchini (born May 24, 1981) is an American Democratic politician and former professional long-distance runner from Maine. Luchini served in the Maine Senate representing District 7, Hancock County from 2018 to 2022. Luchini was born and raised in Ellsworth, Maine and began running competitively in middle school. He was a state champion runner at Ellsworth High School and continued to Stanford University where he earned a degree in human biology and was an all-American runner. Luchini graduated from Stanford in 2004 and signed a contract with Nike to run professionally, also participating in the U.S. Olympic Trials in 2004 and 2008. He returned to Maine in 2009, joined the cross-country coaching staff at Ellsworth High School and ran for the Maine House of Representatives in 2010. Luchini served four terms in the Maine House before running successfully for the Senate in 2018. In 2020, Luchini was re-elected to Senate District 7 for a second two-year term. In January 2022, he resigned from the Senate to accept a job in the U.S. Small Business Administration.

== Early life, education & running career ==
Luchini was born on May 24, 1981 in Ellsworth to Louis Luchini Sr. and Cheryl Higgins. In fifth grade, he became interested in running after watching an older brother's participation in the sport, and by eighth grade Luchini began to compete seriously.

=== Ellsworth High School ===
Luchini helped the Ellsworth Cross Country team win state championships in both 1996 and 1998. As a junior, he placed 11th in the Foot Locker Cross Country Championships and as a senior, he placed second. He graduated from Ellsworth High School in 1999.

=== Stanford University ===
Luchini was recruited to run for Stanford University and majored in human biology, intending to pursue a career in medicine. The Stanford team won NCAA Division I cross country championships in both 2002 and 2003, winning the 2003 contest by 150 points. Luchini earned 11 All-America citations at Stanford. He finished fifth at the 2002 NCAA Division I Cross Country Championships, sixth at the 2003 NCAA Division I Cross Country Championships, and 37th at the 2000 IAAF World Cross Country Championships – Junior men's race. He graduated from Stanford in 2004.

=== Professional career ===
After graduation, Luchini signed a professional running contract with Nike. In 2004 and 2008, he competed in the U.S. Olympic Trials. In 2009, Luchini returned to Maine and worked as an assistant coach to the Ellsworth High School cross country team. As a resident of Ellsworth, Luchini won the Maine Men's division of the 2011 Beach to Beacon 10K. He assumed the role of head coach for Ellsworth in 2015. In 2018, the girls' team won a state title for the first time in 40 years.

Luchini is one of only four men from Maine who have competed in at least two U.S. Olympic Trials and won the Maine title at the Beach to Beacon 10K, along with Ben True, Riley Masters, and Matt Rand. In August 2020, Luchini was named to the Maine Running Hall of Fame.

== Maine Legislature ==
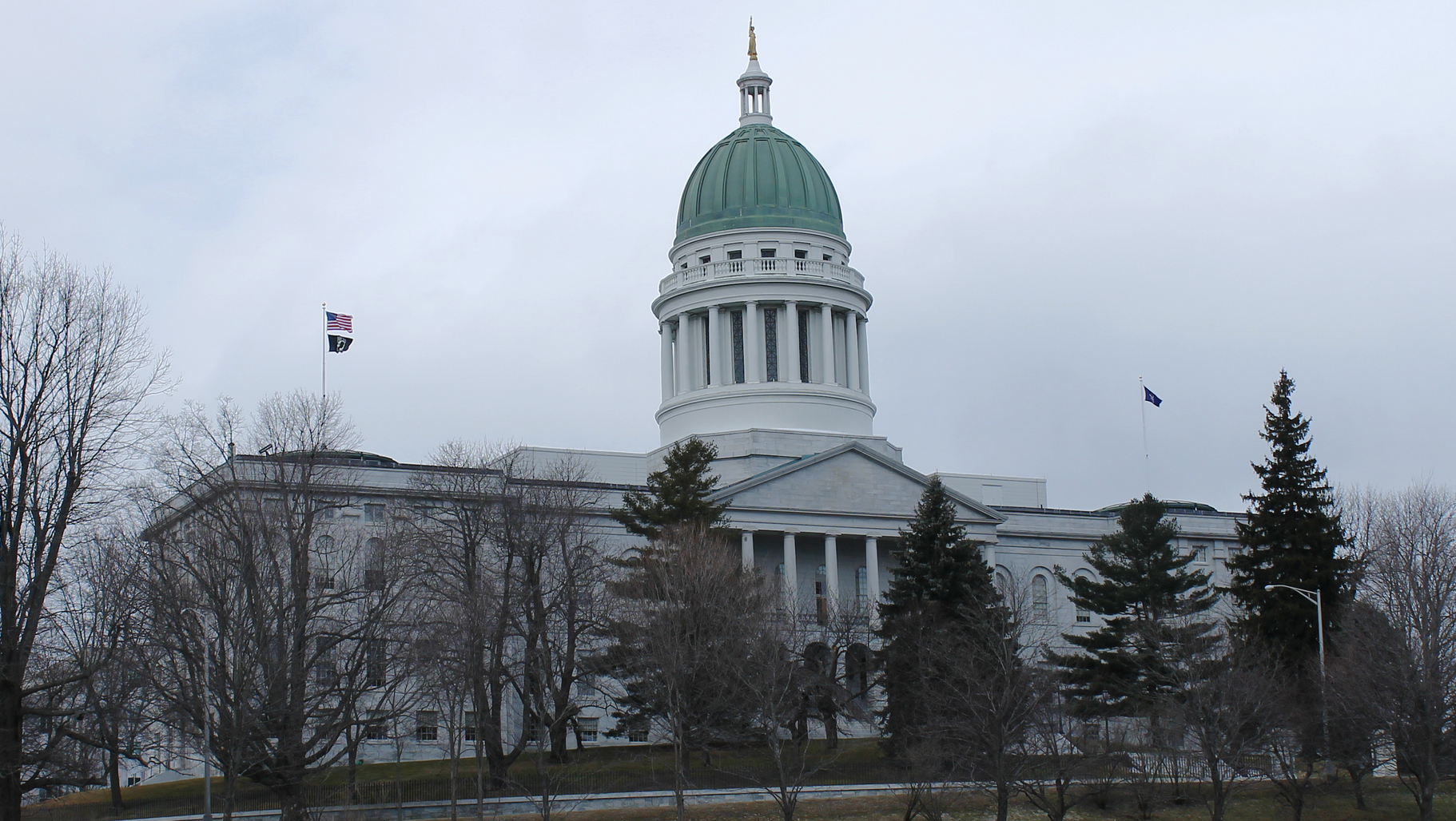
The Maine State Capitol

When he returned to Maine in 2009, Luchini was approached by local friends and acquaintances, including fellow Mainer and Nike professional runner Matt Lane, to run for state legislature. In a 2017 interview, Luchini explained "I’ve always loved this community, so when people asked, I definitely willing to do it. Sports can feel like a selfish endeavor so to give back with public service feels great."

=== House ===
In the 2010 Maine House District 38 race, Luchini defeated Republican Michael Povich 54%-46%. In 2012, he ran unopposed in the Democratic primary and won against Republican Matthew Foster 61.5%-38.5% in the general election. Luchini beat Republican R. Frederick Ehrlenbach in the 2014 House District 132 general election—Maine had undergone redistricting and re-numbering of its legislative districts—62%-38%, and in 2016 he defeated Republican David Edsall 63%-37%. During his time in the House, Luchini served as the House Chair of the Veterans and Legal Affairs Committee and as chair of the House Ethics Committee. In 2017, he was named Legislator of the Year by the American Legion.

=== Senate ===
In late March 2018, Luchini announced that he would run as a Clean Elections candidate for Maine Senate District 7. He defeated fellow Democrat Ian Schwartz 68%-32% in the Democratic primary, and beat Republican Richard Malaby in the general election 64%-36%. In 2020, Luchini ran unopposed in the Senate District 7 Democratic primary and defeated Republican Brian Langley, who had preceded Luchini in both his House and Senate seats, 55%-45%. He serves on the Innovation, Development, Economic Advancement and Business committee and is the chair of the Veterans and Legal Affairs committee. On 18 January 2022, Luchini announced his resignation in order to take a job as an advocate within the United States Small Business Administration.

==== Voting record ====
In 2017, Luchini supported a bill to restore Maine's tipped minimum wage and sponsored legislation to extend Maine's deadline for legalizing adult possession of marijuana.

In 2018, he introduced a bill increasing regulations for signature-gatherers on citizen ballot initiatives, and voted in favor of a $45 million tax break for Bath Ironworks. He also voted to uphold Governor Paul LePage's veto of a bill that would have allowed Bar Harbor to establish a port authority.

In 2019, Luchini voted to uphold religious exemptions to school vaccination requirements, amending a proposed new law to eliminate all but medical exemptions for school attendance statewide.

In 2020 and 2021, he introduced legislation to legalize and regulate sports betting in Maine.

== Electoral record ==
=== Maine House ===
2010 Maine House District 38 General Election
Party	Candidate	Votes	%
Democratic	Louis Luchini	2,305	54.0%
Republican	Michael Povich	1,966	46.0%
Total votes		4,271	100.0%

2012 Maine House District 38 Democratic primary
Party	Candidate	Votes	%
Democratic	Louis Luchini		100.0%
Total votes			100.0%

2012 Maine House District 38 General Election
Party	Candidate	Votes	%
Democratic	Louis Luchini	3,118	61.5%
Republican	Matthew Foster	1,954	38.5%
Total votes		5,072	100.0%

2014 Maine House District 132 Democratic primary
Party	Candidate	Votes	%
Democratic	Louis Luchini		100.0%
Total votes			100.0%

2014 Maine House District 132 General Election
Party	Candidate	Votes	%
Democratic	Louis Luchini	2,508	61.7%
Republican	R. Frederick Ehrlenbach	1,560	38.3%
Total votes		4,068	100.0%

2016 Maine House District 132 Democratic primary
Party	Candidate	Votes	%
Democratic	Louis Luchini		100.0%
Total votes			100.0%

2016 Maine House District 132 General Election
Party	Candidate	Votes	%
Democratic	Louis Luchini	3,228	63.0%
Republican	David Edsall	1,893	37.0%
Total votes		5,121	100.0%

=== Maine Senate ===
2018 Maine Senate District 7 Democratic primary
Party	Candidate	Votes	%
Democratic	Louis Luchini	3,405	68.4%
Democratic	Ian Schwartz	1,571	31.6
Total votes		4,976	100.0%

2018 Maine Senate District 7 General Election
Party	Candidate	Votes	%
Democratic	Louis Luchini	13,363	64.1%
Republican	Richard Malaby	7,486	35.9%
Total votes		20,849	100.0%

2020 Maine Senate District 7 Democratic primary
Party	Candidate	Votes	%
Democratic	Louis Luchini	6,294	100.0%
Total votes		6,294	100.0%

2020 Maine Senate District 7 General Election
Party	Candidate	Votes	%
Democratic	Louis Luchini	14,280	55.0%
Republican	Brian Langley	11,672	45.0%
Total votes		25,952	100.0%
