= Maine Central class L 4-4-0 =

Maine Central class L
Type and origin
- Power type: Steam
- Builder: Schenectady Locomotive Works
- Build date: 1893–1894
Specifications
- Configuration
  - Whyte: 4-4-0
  - UIC: 2'B
- Gauge: 4 ft 8 1/2 in (1,435 mm)
- Wheelbase: 46 ft 9 in (14.25 m) including tender
- Loco weight: 110,000 lb (49.9 tonnes)
- Total weight: 184,000 lb (83.5 tonnes)
- Fuel type: Coal
- Cylinders: Two
Performance figures
- Tractive effort: 17,000 lbf (75.6 kN)
Career
- Retired: 1925-1947
- Disposition: All scrapped

Maine Central Railroad Class L locomotives were intended for main line passenger service. They were of 4-4-0 wheel arrangement in the Whyte notation, or "2'B" in UIC classification. They were transferred to branch line passenger service as replaced by class N 4-6-0 locomotives beginning in 1899. Ten numbered 191 to 201 survived United States Railroad Administration operations to appear on a 1923 roster. All were retired between 1925 and 1947 and were scrapped from 1945-1955 . None were preserved.
