= Woodlawn Museum =

Historic house in Maine, United States

- Black House
- U.S. National Register of Historic Places
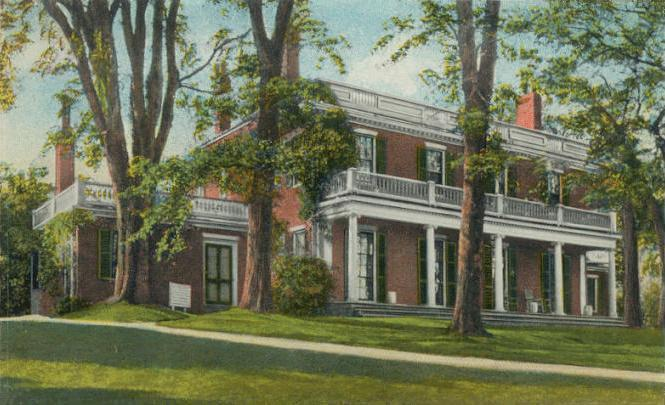

- Location within Maine Location within the United States
- Location: 19 Black House Drive, (ME 172), Ellsworth, Maine
- Coordinates: 44.53608°N 68.43345°W
- Area: 178 acres (72 ha)
- Built: 1824-1827
- Architectural style: Federal
- NRHP reference No.: 69000026
- Added to NRHP: December 23, 1969

Woodlawn, also known locally as the Black House, is a 180-acre (73 ha) historic estate located a quarter mile from downtown Ellsworth, Maine, at 19 Black House Drive. The Black House Museum is open to the public seasonally and the grounds are open every day, dawn to dusk. The museum was home to three generations of the Black family and features many of their possessions. The family patriarch, John Black, was an agent for a major landowner in the region, and built the mansion house in 1824–27. There are over two miles of hiking trails, a nationally sanctioned croquet court, gardens, fields, and forest open to the public all year. The Black House Museum was listed on the National Register of Historic Places in 1969.

== Description and history ==
Philadelphia businessman William Bingham purchased a very large tract of land in Maine not long after the American Revolutionary War, and sold half of it in 1792 to an English company. The company sent John Black, then just eighteen, to Maine to act as its agent. Black worked in cooperation with Bingham's agent, David Cobb, eventually marrying Mary Cobb, his daughter. Mary and John had eight children and John, at the age of 44, built this three-story brick mansion with elegant Federal and Greek Revival styling. Bricks for the house were shipped from Philadelphia, and construction by masons from Boston took three years (1824–27). The building's main facade features a porch across the full width of the main block, supported by Doric columns and topped by a balustrade. The roof is surrounded by a balustrade with panel sections. A single story addition to the left of the main block also has a roof ringed by a balustrade.

Behind the main house is an attached Ell that was used for cooking and housework, then became home to the resident caretakers. It now provides staff offices. Behind these buildings an event space is under construction that sits on the footprint of a carriage and horse barn. There is also a small sleigh barn and a newly constructed carriage barn with a permanent exhibition. The family tomb is located near the southern end of the property. The estate was given, complete with most of the contents, to the Hancock County Trustees of Public Reservations in 1928 as indicated in the will of George Nixon Black Jr. The Trustees manage the property as a museum, park and event space.

Facilities on the estate include three miles of field walking and forest hiking trails, the only regulation size croquet court in the state, a community garden, sledding and skating in the winter as well as many community events. The barn events venue will be open year-round and will be available for rent as well as serving as the archival storage facility and educational programming. Downeast Senior College is based at Woodlawn and operates from the former Caretaker's Cottage near the trailhead.
