= Brian Langley =

Maine State Senator

Member of the Maine Senate from the 7th district
- In office 2010–2018
- Preceded by: Dennis Damon
- Succeeded by: Louis Luchini

Member of the Maine House of Representatives from the 38th district
- In office December 2008 – December 2010
- Preceded by: Robert H. Crosthwaite
- Succeeded by: Louis Luchini

Personal details
- Party: Republican
- Spouse: Jane Bromley
- Profession: Restaurant owner and schoolteacher

Brian Langley is an American politician, restaurant owner and schoolteacher from Maine. Langley was a Republican State Senator from Maine's 28th District, representing much of Hancock County, including the population centers of Bar Harbor and Ellsworth. He was first elected to the Maine State Senate in 2010 after defeating Democrat James Schatz and Green Independent Lynne Williams. He previously served one term from 2008 to 2010 representing Ellsworth, Otis and Trenton in the Maine House of Representatives. He studied at the University of Southern Maine and Syracuse University and taught culinary arts at the Hancock County Technical Center. Langley could not run for reelection in 2018 due to term limits. He ran again for the 7th district again against his successor, Democrat Louis Luchini, and lost. Luchini resigned in early 2022 and Langley announced his candidacy for the special election to replace him. On June 14, 2022, Langley lost the special election to Nicole Grohoski to fill the vacant seat for Senate District 7. In a rematch of the Special Election, Langley again lost the General Election to Nicole Grohoski on November 8, 2022.

Langley owns the Union River Lobster Pot Restaurant in his hometown of Ellsworth. He is a board member of the First Congregational Church in Ellsworth. During his time in the Maine Senate, Langley chaired the Education committee and served on the Marine Resources Committee. He was a strong supporter of Technical Education. His support of innovation led to the passage of legislation for "Innovative School Districts" and allowing charter schools to operate in Maine, a policy which he helped pass as law in 2011.

Maine House of Representatives
Preceded by Robert H. Crosthwaite	Member of the Maine House of Representatives from the 38th district 2008–2010	Succeeded by Louis Luchini
Maine Senate
Preceded by Dennis Damon	Member of the Maine Senate from the 28th district 2010–2014	Succeeded by Anne Haskell
Preceded by Rebecca Millett	Member of the Maine Senate from the 7th district 2014–2018	Succeeded by Louis Luchini
