= Agassiz Bedrock Outcrop =

- U.S. National Register of Historic Places
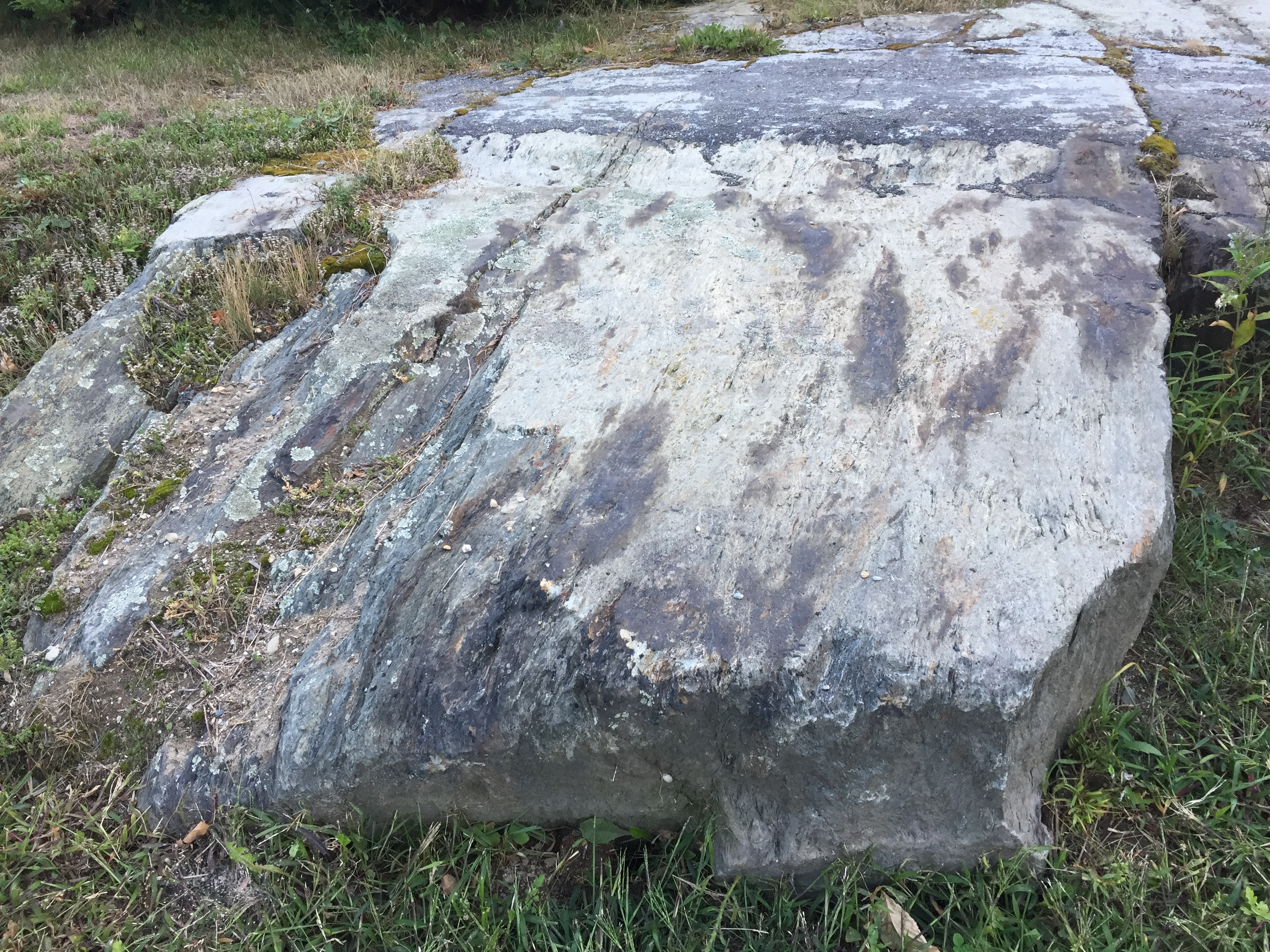

- Location within Maine Location within the United States
- Location: 406 State St. Ellsworth, Maine
- Coordinates: 44°33′40″N 68°26′19″W
- Area: 1.2 acres (0.49 ha)
- Built: 1864
- NRHP reference No.: 03000014
- Added to NRHP: February 13, 2003

The Agassiz Bedrock Outcrop is a geographic feature of Ellsworth, Maine that is significant in the history of geology. Located at 406 State Street (U.S. Route 1A), it is an outcrop of Ellsworth schist marked with striations created by glacial action between 25,000 and 13,000 years ago. This outcrop was analyzed by Harvard University geologist Louis Agassiz in 1864 and described in his groundbreaking 1867 paper, Glacial Phenomena in Maine. It was listed on the National Register of Historic Places in 2003.

== Description and history ==
The outcrop consists of an extended patch of bedrock on the southwest side of State Street, of which two sections are presently visible on the surface. They are located at the southeast and northeast corners of the property at 406 State Street, whose gravel driveway runs over the bedrock between the two visible sections. The southeastern section is about 20 feet (6.1 m) square, with a smooth surface on which several parallel grooves are scratched. The northeastern section is about 30 by 50 feet (9.1 m × 15.2 m), with a series of deep grooves. It is in particular possible to trace grooves made by stones dragged by the glacier by extending the trajectory of the grooves from one section across the parking area to the other. The buildings and other improvements on the property are not historically significant.

The mid-19th century was a period of significant debate within the geological community about the nature of markings found in northern New England similar to those found here. A common belief was that they were caused by drifting icebergs during the Flood of Noah, as recounted in the Bible. The first hypothesis involving a massive glacier was proposed in 1859 by John DeLaski, an amateur geologist from Rockland, Maine, which did not receive significant scientific press until 1864. That summer, Louis Agassiz, then a professor at Harvard, vacationed in Maine, and examined a variety of bedrock locations from the coast as far inland as Mount Katahdin. His 1867 paper, Glacial Phenomena in Maine, described his findings from this trip, and proposed that North America, like much of northern Europe, had been covered by ice sheets. He specifically mentioned the "splendid polished surfaces" found at Ellsworth Falls, "with scratches and furrows pointing due north" as one piece of evidence in support of his argument.

== See also ==
- National Register of Historic Places listings in Hancock County, Maine
- Agassiz Rock, a small park with glacial erratics in Massachusetts also studied by Agassiz
