= The Grand (Ellsworth, Maine) =

- U.S. National Register of Historic Places
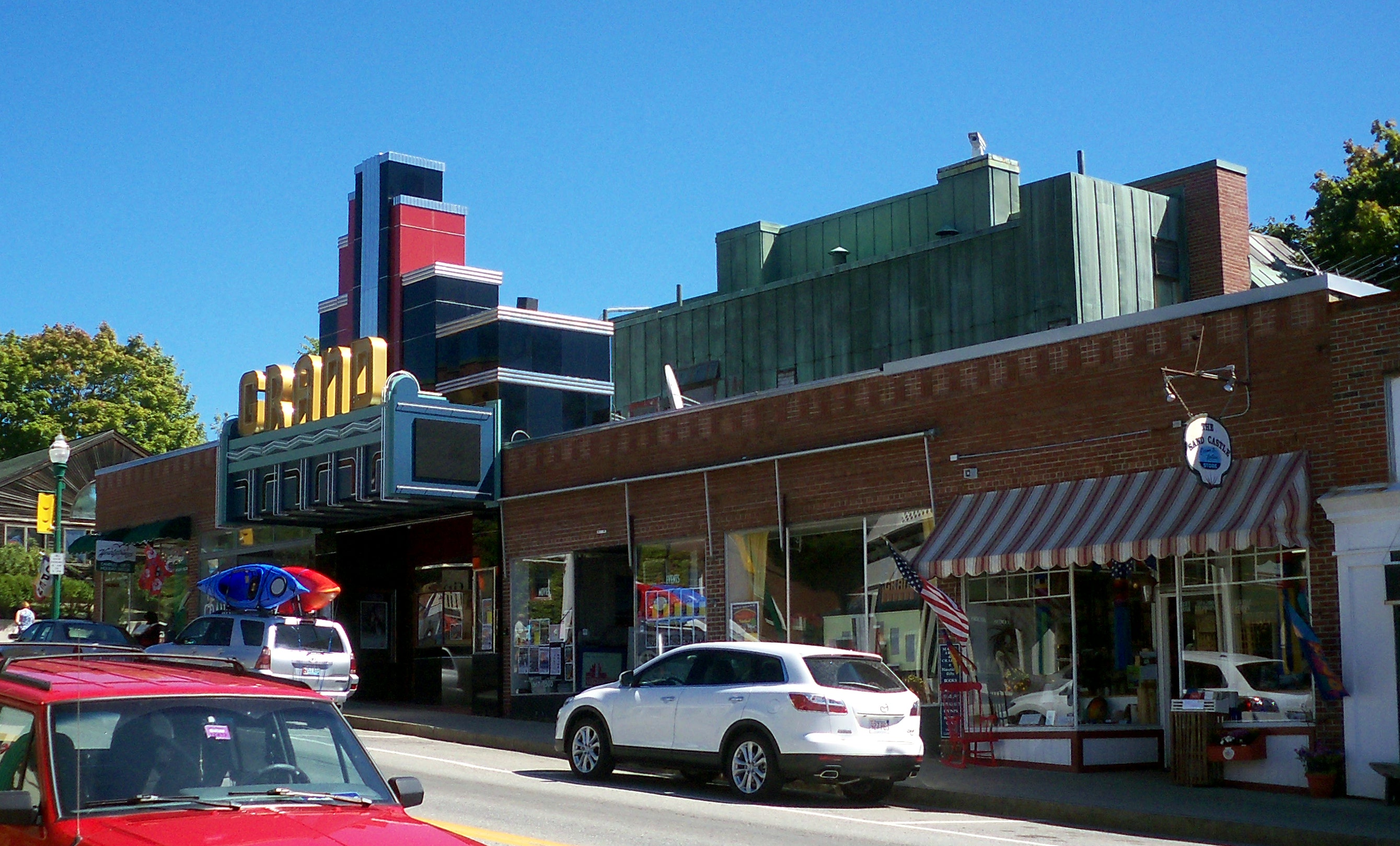

- Location within Maine
- Location: 163, 165, 167, 169, & 173 Main St., Ellsworth, Maine
- Coordinates: 44°32′30″N 68°25′22″W
- Area: less than one acre
- Built: 1938
- Built by: William McPherson
- Architect: Krokyn & Browne
- Architectural style: Art Deco
- NRHP reference No.: 12000452
- Added to NRHP: August 1, 2012

The Grand is a Non-Profit performing arts center on Main Street (United States Route 1) in Ellsworth, Maine. Built in 1938, it is a significant local example of Art Deco architecture, with a prominent marquee and a stepped steel-and-glass tower. It was listed on the National Register of Historic Places on August 1, 2012.

== Description and history ==
The Grand (Hancock County Auditorium Associates) is a 501(c)3 Non-Profit performing arts center presenting film, live theater, live broadcasts from The Metropolitan Opera and National Theatre in London, music and educational opportunities. Its mission is to "foster social interaction and growth in artists and audiences through arts, entertainment and education".

An arsonist destroyed much of the Ellsworth business district in 1933, apparently starting a fire the city's first movie theatre, the Bijou. The Grand was built in 1938 as part of the recovery effort. It was designed by Boston architects Krokyn & Brown, and is a single-story brick building which includes five storefront spaces and a rear two-story auditorium, designed for showing movies, with an original capacity of 730 patrons. The storefronts are each three bays wide and are separated from one another by brick piers. Four of the five have recessed center entrances flanked by plate glass windows; the fourth, which has been joined to an adjacent unit, has three plate glass windows. The storefronts (two to the left of the theatre entrance, three to the right) are unified under patterned brick lintels. Due to the sloping terrain, the three leftmost fronts are at a higher elevation than those to the right. The theatre entrance has flanking sections of polished granite and black Vitrolite glass which house display cases for playbills, set on either side of a recessed entrance area consisting of a pair of doorways on either side of a ticket booth. The full width of the front is sheltered by a marquee with Art Deco styling, topped by the theatre's name in large stylized lettering. Behind the marquee rises a stepped Art Deco tower, consisting of stepped sections of black and red Vitrolite glass, with horizontal bands of stainless steel trim and a central wide vertical band of stainless steel.

The entrance opens into a large lobby area housing concession stands, and giving access to restroom facilities and the auditorium beyond. The acoustic ceiling tiles are arranged in patterns echoing those on the exterior of the building, and there is gold-painted Art Deco trim accenting the walls. On the south side of the lobby is the ornamented entry to a room that was originally used as a smoking chamber. The gold Art Deco trim is continued into the auditorium space.

The Grand served as a movie theatre from 1938 to 1962. The theatre was purchased by a nonprofit in 1975 and was reopened for a benefit performance that year. It has since served as a performance hall for theatre, concerts, and Met Opera HD broadcasts, among other events. It was listed on the National Register of Historic Places in 2012, citing its locally distinctive architecture, and its long-running role as a major entertainment venue in the region. Its capacity was reduced by renovations after the 1975 purchase to 480 to provide space for a stage.

== See also ==
- National Register of Historic Places listings in Hancock County, Maine
