= Maine Central class C 4-6-2 =

Class of American 4-6-2 locomotive

Maine Central class C
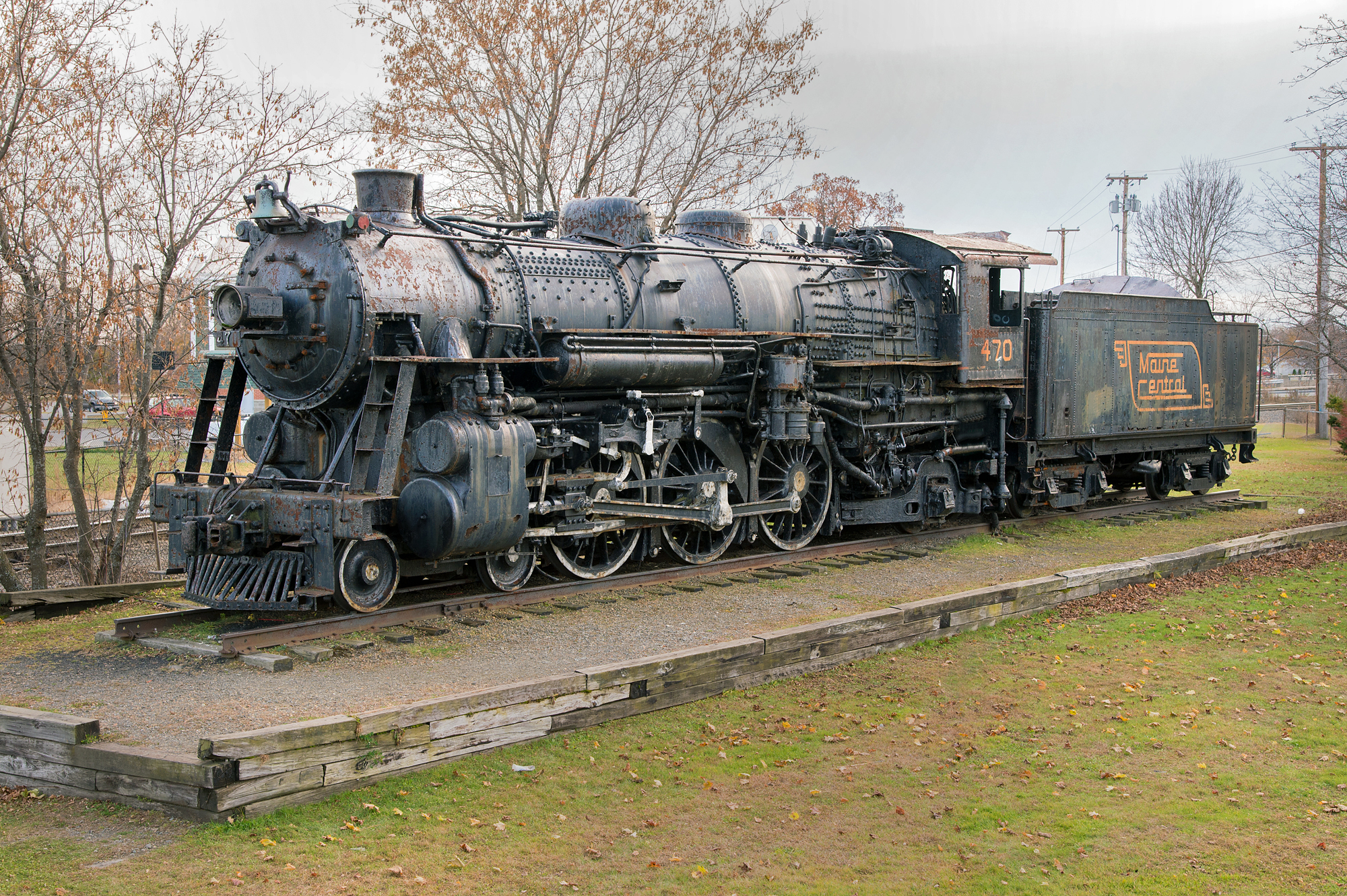
- Maine Central No. 470
Type and origin
- Power type: Steam
- Builder: ALCO
- Build date: 1907–1924
- Total produced: 21
Specifications
- Configuration
  - Whyte: 4-6-2
  - UIC: 2'C1'
- Gauge: 4 ft 8 1/2 in (1,435 mm)
- Leading dia.: 33 in (838 mm)
- Driver dia.: 73 in (1,854 mm)
- Trailing dia.: 46 in (1,168 mm)
- Wheelbase: 33 ft 8 in (10.26 m)
- Length: 75 ft 0 in (22.86 m) including tender
- Height: 14 ft 7 1/4 in (4.45 m)
- Loco weight: 228,000 lb (103.4 tonnes)
- Total weight: 367,000 lb (166.5 tonnes)
- Fuel type: Coal
- Fuel capacity: 11 t
- Water cap.: 7,000 US gal (26 m^{3})
- Firebox
  - Grate area: 50 sq ft (4.65 m^{2})
- Boiler pressure: 200 lbf/in^{2} (14 kg/cm^{2})
- Cylinders: Two
- Cylinder size: 22 in × 28 in (559 mm × 711 mm)
- Valve gear: Walschaerts
Performance figures
- Tractive effort: 32,000 lbf (142.3 kN)
Career
- Retired: 1954
- Preserved: 1 C-3 No. 470 preserved
- Disposition: One preserved, remainder scrapped

Maine Central Railroad Class C locomotives were intended for main line passenger service. They were of 4-6-2 wheel arrangement in the Whyte notation, or " 2'C1' " in UIC classification. They replaced earlier class N 4-6-0 locomotives beginning in 1907. Class C locomotives pulled named passenger trains until replacement by diesel locomotives after World War II.

== Sub-classes ==
All were built in American Locomotive Company's plant at Schenectady, New York and were numbered from 450 to 470 as delivered. The original C class were builders numbers 42439 & 42440 delivered in 1907, 46036-46038 in 1909, 47731 in 1910, and 49205-49206 in 1911. Sub-class C-1 consisted of builders numbers 50940 & 50941 built in 1912, and 52985-52986 & 53291 completed in 1913. Builders numbers 54568 through 54570 arrived in 1914 as sub-class C-2 with weight increased to 238,500 lb (108.2 tonnes).

=== Sub-class C-3 ===
The last five Maine Central Pacifics were built with booster engines. Increasing cylinder diameter to 24 inches (610 mm) increased tractive effort to 36,500 lbf (162.4 kN) or 46,800 lbf (208.2 kN) with the booster. Enlarged tenders held 13 tons of coal and 9,100 US gal (34 m^{3}) of water. Builders numbers 57885 through 57887 were delivered in 1917 with weight increased to 268,300 lb (121.7 tonnes). Building of new 4-6-2s was interrupted by World War I when the United States Railroad Administration (USRA) authorized construction of non-standard class O 4-6-0s because Maine Central Pacifics were so much smaller than USRA Light Pacifics. The final two class C engines were builders numbers 65554 and 65555 delivered in 1924. Number 470 was preserved in Waterville, Maine after pulling the last Maine Central steam-powered train on 13 June 1954.

== Replacement ==
The last steam locomotives built for Maine Central were class D 4-6-4s numbered 701 and 702 from Baldwin Locomotive Works in 1930. The Budd Company Flying Yankee train set and unstreamlined 600 horsepower (450 kW) oil-electric rail car number 901 arrived in 1935. EMD E7s numbered 705 through 711 began pulling main line passenger trains in 1946. Steam-generator-equipped road switchers pulled a declining number of branch line passenger trains from 1950 until Maine Central discontinued all passenger service in 1960.
