= Maine Central class N 4-6-0 =

Maine Central class N
Type and origin
- Power type: Steam
- Builder: ALCO
- Build date: 1899–1906
- Total produced: 15
Specifications
- Configuration
  - Whyte: 4-6-0
  - UIC: 2'C
- Gauge: 4 ft 8 1/2 in (1,435 mm)
- Fuel type: Coal
- Cylinders: Two

Maine Central Railroad Class N locomotives were intended for main line passenger service. They were of 4-6-0 wheel arrangement in the Whyte notation, or "2'C" in UIC classification. All were built at the Schenectady Locomotive Works which became the American Locomotive Company (ALCO) in 1901. They replaced earlier class L 4-4-0 locomotives beginning in 1899. They were transferred to branch line passenger service as replaced by class C 4-6-2 locomotives beginning in 1907. Most were scrapped during the Great Depression and none survived World War II.

| Number | Works number | Date | Engine weight | Tractive effort | Notes |
|---|---|---|---|---|---|
| 275 | 4965 | 1899 | 140,600 lb (63.8 tonnes) | 21,300 lbf (94.7 kN) | |
| 276 | 4966 | 1899 | 140,600 lb (63.8 tonnes) | 21,300 lbf (94.7 kN) | |
| 277 | 5359 | 1899 | 140,600 lb (63.8 tonnes) | 21,300 lbf (94.7 kN) | |
| 278 | 5360 | 1899 | 140,600 lb (63.8 tonnes) | 21,300 lbf (94.7 kN) | |
| 279 | 6066 | 1901 | 142,000 lb (64.4 tonnes) | 21,300 lbf (94.7 kN) | |
| 280 | 6067 | 1901 | 142,000 lb (64.4 tonnes) | 21,300 lbf (94.7 kN) | |
| 281 | 6068 | 1901 | 142,000 lb (64.4 tonnes) | 21,300 lbf (94.7 kN) | |
| 282 | 27660 | 1903 | 147,800 lb (67.0 tonnes) | 21,300 lbf (94.7 kN) | |
| 283 | 27661 | 1903 | 147,800 lb (67.0 tonnes) | 21,300 lbf (94.7 kN) | |
| 284 | 29723 | 1904 | 156,000 lb (70.8 tonnes) | 21,800 lbf (97.0 kN) | |
| 285 | 29724 | 1904 | 156,000 lb (70.8 tonnes) | 21,800 lbf (97.0 kN) | |
| 286 | 30450 | 1905 | 156,000 lb (70.8 tonnes) | 21,800 lbf (97.0 kN) | |
| 287 | 30451 | 1905 | 156,000 lb (70.8 tonnes) | 21,800 lbf (97.0 kN) | |
| 288 | 40081 | 1906 | 158,000 lb (71.7 tonnes) | 23,000 lbf (102.3 kN) | |
| 289 | 40082 | 1906 | 158,000 lb (71.7 tonnes) | 23,000 lbf (102.3 kN) | |
