= Ellsworth Congregational Church =

Historic church in Maine, United States

- U.S. National Register of Historic Places
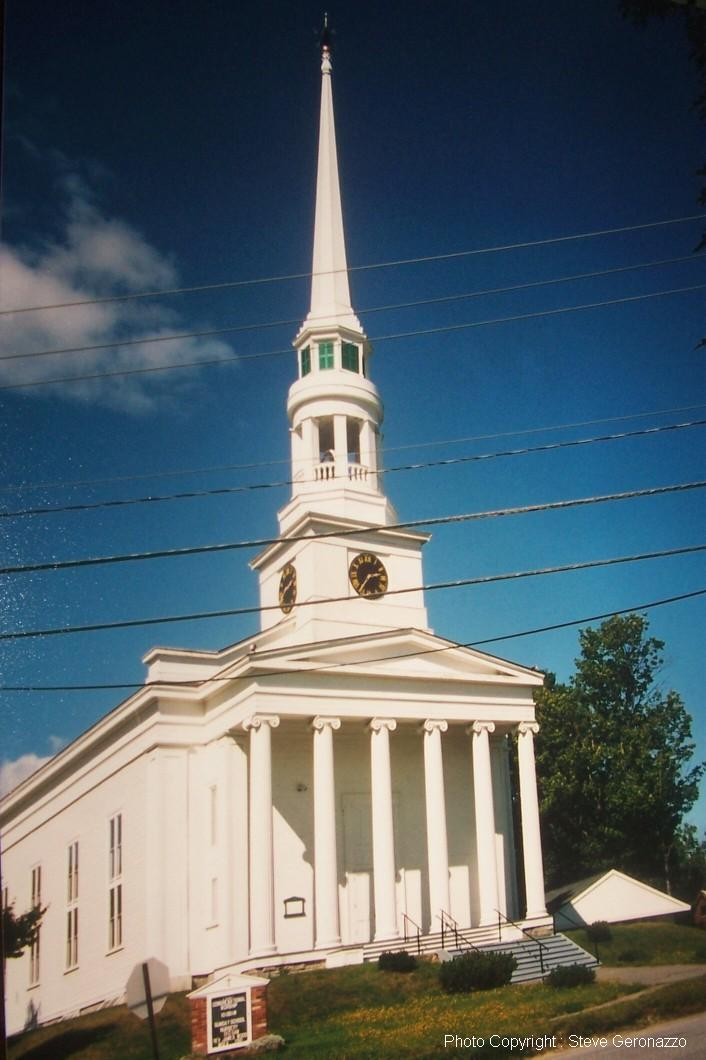

- Location within Maine Location within the United States
- Location: 2 Church St., Ellsworth, Maine
- Coordinates: 44°32′37″N 68°25′52″W
- Area: less than one acre
- Built: 1846
- Architect: Lord, Thomas
- Architectural style: Greek Revival
- NRHP reference No.: 73000108
- Added to NRHP: April 23, 1973

The Ellsworth Congregational Church is a historic church at 2 Church Street in Ellsworth, Maine, United States. The congregation was organized in 1812, and is affiliated with the United Church of Christ. Its present Greek Revival building was constructed in 1846, and was listed on the National Register of Historic Places in 1973 for its architectural significance. The current pastor is the Reverend Cynthia Priem.

== Architecture and history ==
The church is sited on a rise on the north side of Ellsworth's central business district, at the corner of Church and State Streets. It is a large wood-frame structure with Greek Revival styling. Its body is 2 1/2 stories in height, and is topped at the front by a multi-stage tower: its first stage is square, housing a clock, and is topped by an octagonal belfry with an open balustrade. Above the belfry is a round section supporting an octagonal windows stage, above which the steeple rises to a weathervane. The front of the church has a projecting Greek temple front, with six fluted Doric columns supporting a triangular gabled pediment. The building's corners are pilasters. A wing extends from the rear northeast corner, apparently a replacement for another building that was on the site in an 1881 photo. A modern parish hall is attached to the northwest of the building via a passageway.

The Ellsworth congregation was organized in 1812, and its sanctuary was built in 1846 by Thomas Lord, a master builder from Blue Hill. The building is notable for surviving a 1933 fire which devastated much of Ellsworth's business district.

== See also ==
- National Register of Historic Places listings in Hancock County, Maine
