= Nicole Grohoski =

American politician

Member of the Maine Senate from the 7th district
- Incumbent
- Assumed office July 6, 2022
- Preceded by: Louis Luchini

Member of the Maine House of Representatives from the 132nd district
- In office December 5, 2018 – July 6, 2022
- Preceded by: Louis Luchini
- Succeeded by: Mark Worth

Personal details
- Born: Ellsworth, Maine
- Party: Democratic
- Education: Middlebury College
- Occupation: Cartographer, GIS Specialist

Nicole Grohoski is an American cartographer, naturalist, and politician from Maine. She is a Democrat representing District 7 in the Maine Senate. Grohoski was born in Ellsworth, Maine and attended Ellsworth High School, the Maine School of Science and Mathematics, and Middlebury College, earning degrees in chemistry and environmental science. She served two terms in the Maine House of Representatives before running for the Maine Senate in a special election in June 2022. Grohoski was re-elected to Senate District 7 in November 2022 and is currently serving her second term.

== Early life and education ==
Grohoski was raised in Ellsworth, Maine by Jackie Grohoski, a school nurse, and Ed Grohoski, an electrician and veteran of the Vietnam War. Nicole attended Ellsworth High School, the Maine School of Science and Mathematics, and Middlebury College where she received a bachelor's degree in chemistry and environmental studies in 2005.

== Political career ==
In 2018, Grohoski ran for election to represent District 132 (Ellsworth and Trenton) in the Maine House of Representatives and defeated Republican Mark Remick to win. She was re-elected in 2020. On June 14, 2022, Grohoski won a special election to fill a vacated Senate seat in Maine's Senate District 7 (most of Hancock County) through December 7, 2022. She won re-election to the Maine Senate on November 8, 2022 against Republican Brian Langley.

== Personal life ==
Grohoski lives in Ellsworth and works for a small mapping company. She volunteers with the Green Ellsworth citizens' initiative, is on the Board of Directors for the Northern Forest Canoe Trail, and drives for Meals on Wheels.

== Electoral record ==
2018 general election: Maine House of Representatives, District 132
Party	Candidate	Votes	%
Democratic	Nicole Grohoski	2,396	54.3%
Republican	Mark Remick	2,014	45.7%

2020 general election: Maine House of Representatives, District 132
Party	Candidate	Votes	%
Democratic	Nicole Grohoski	3,099	55.3%
Republican	Michelle Kaplan	2,505	44.7%

2022 special election: Maine Senate, District 7
Party	Candidate	Votes	%
Democratic	Nicole Grohoski	6,506	63.4%
Republican	Brian Langley	3,635	35.5%
Green	Benjamin Meiklejohn	115	1.1%

2022 general election: Maine Senate, District 7
Party	Candidate	Votes	%
Democratic	Nicole Grohoski	12,811	59%
Republican	Brian Langley	8,913	41%
