= Ellsworth, Maine =

City in Maine, United States

- City
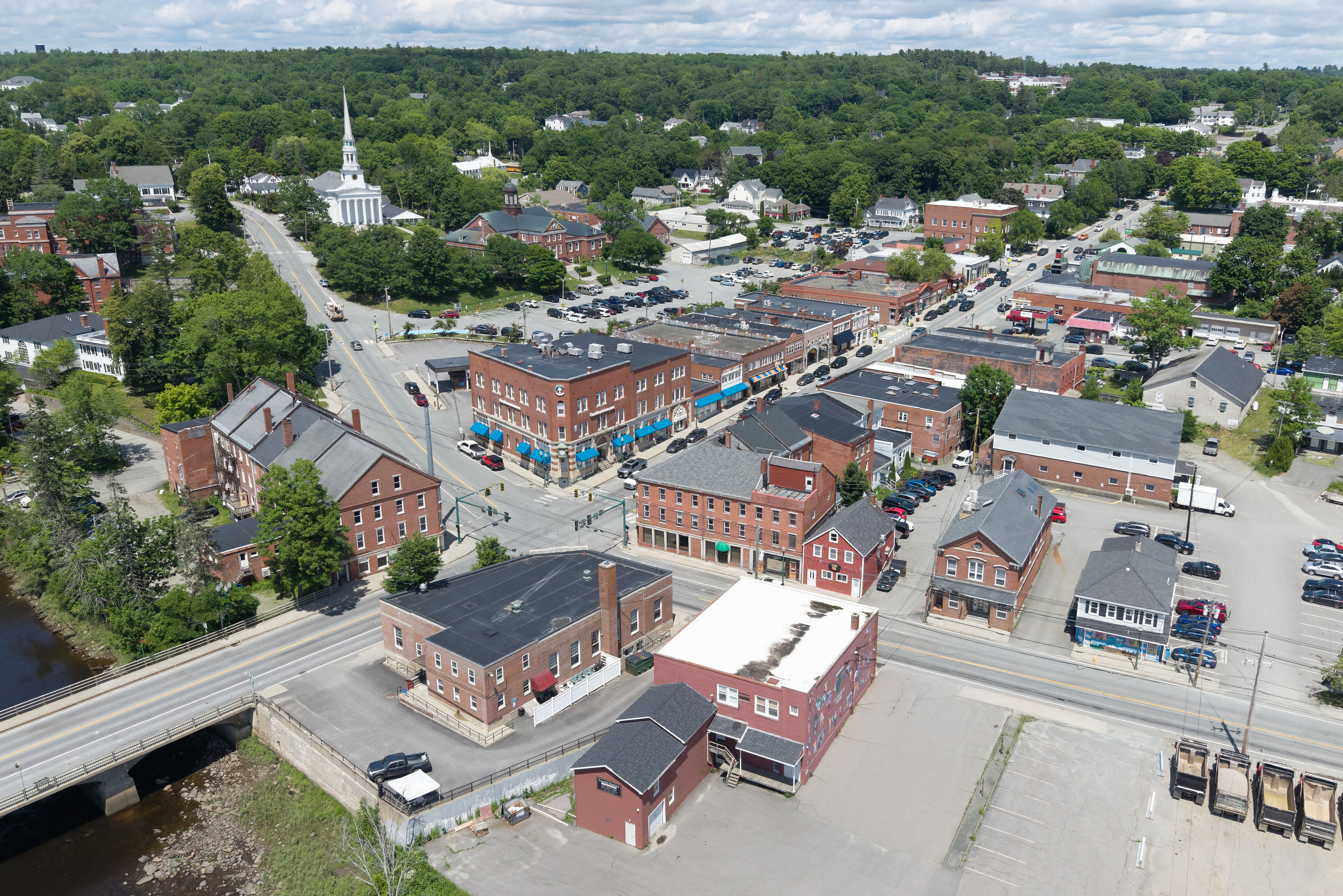
- Aerial view of downtown along the Union River

- Seal Logo

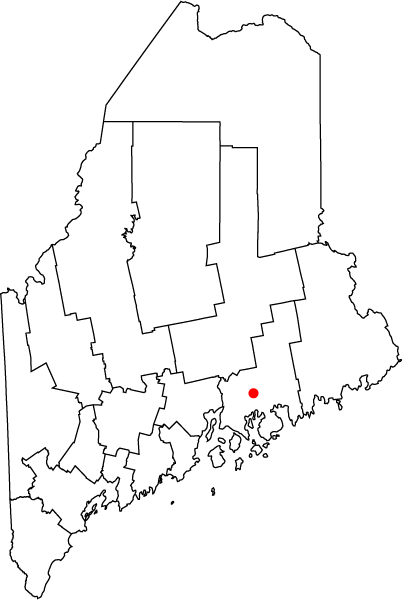
- Location of city of Ellsworth in the state of Maine
- Coordinates: 44°35′03″N 68°32′43″W
- Country: United States
- State: Maine
- County: Hancock
- Settled: 1763
- Incorporated (town): February 26, 1800
- Incorporated (city): February 8, 1869
- Villages: Ellsworth Falls; North Ellsworth; West Ellsworth

Government
  - City manager: Charles Pearce

Area
  - Total: 93.92 sq mi (243.25 km^{2})
  - Land: 79.29 sq mi (205.35 km^{2})
  - Water: 14.63 sq mi (37.90 km^{2})
- Elevation: 302 ft (92 m)

Population (2020)
  - Total: 8,399
  - Density: 106/sq mi (40.9/km^{2})
- Time zone: UTC−5 (Eastern (EST))
  - Summer (DST): UTC−4 (EDT)
- ZIP code: 04605
- Area code: 207
- FIPS code: 23-23200
- GNIS feature ID: 582465
- Website: ellsworthmaine.gov

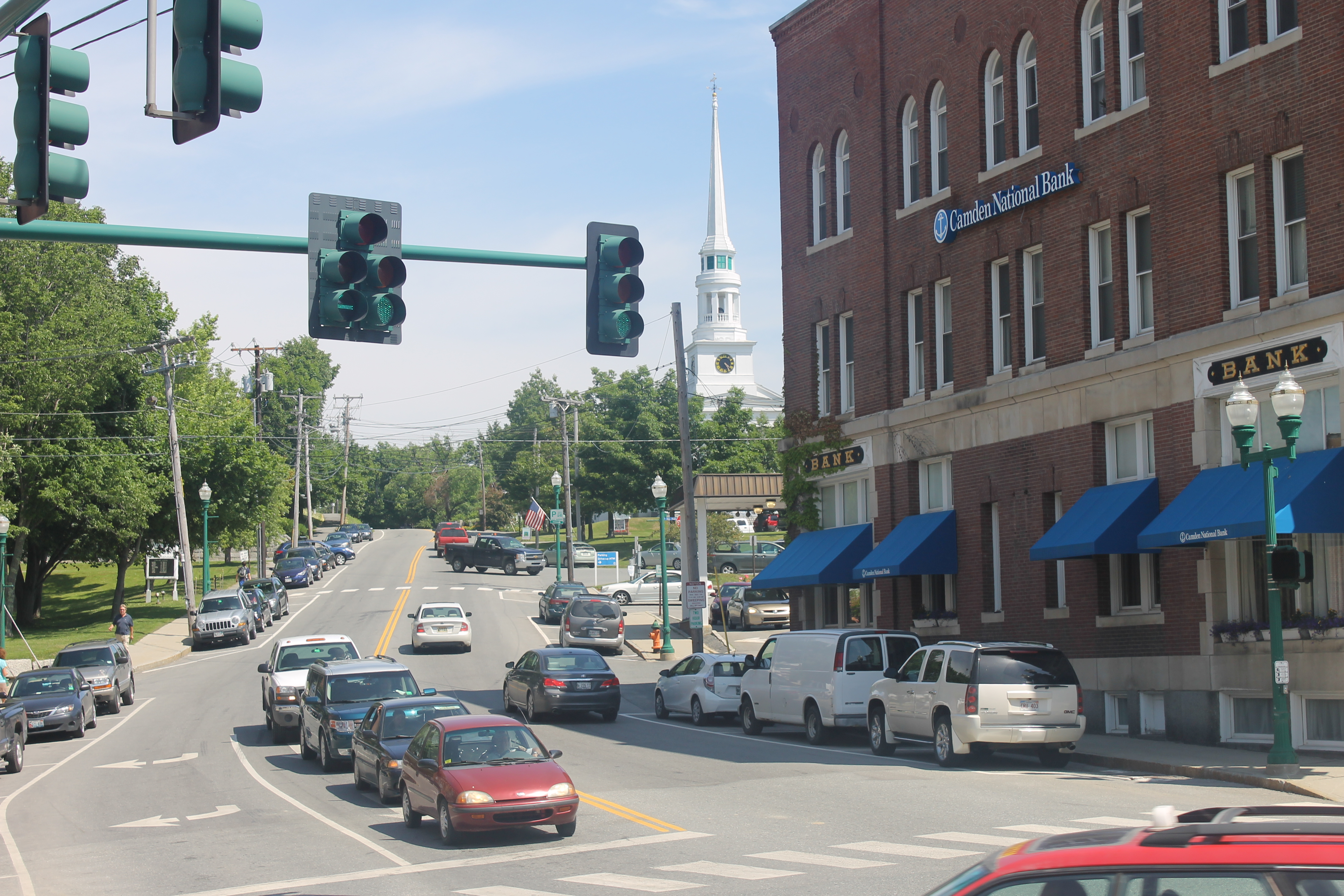
Traffic alongside the Camden National Bank downtown; Ellsworth is now the fastest growing city in the state of Maine.

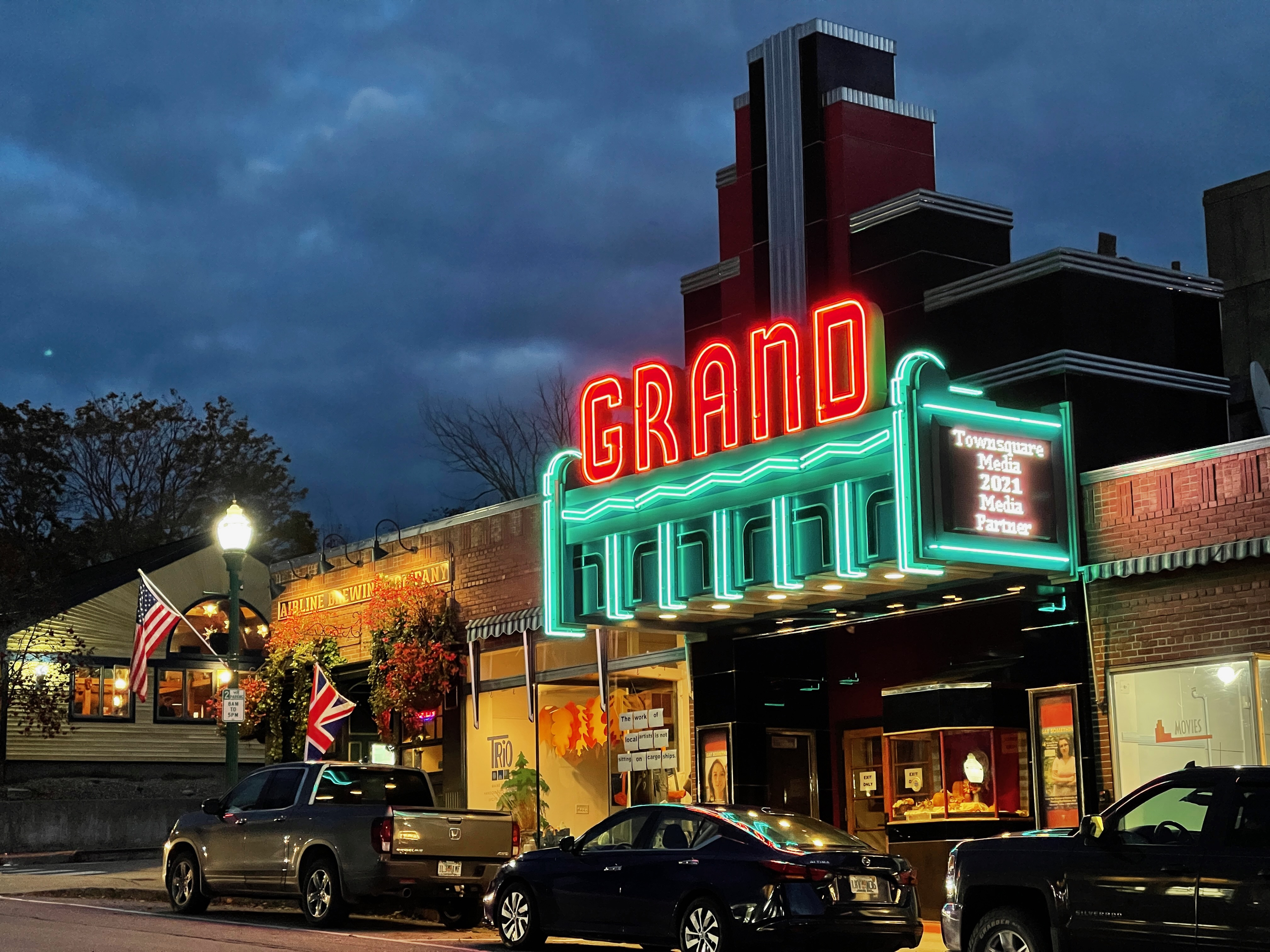
The neon lights of The Grand's marquee light up Main Street in downtown Ellsworth, Maine at dusk.

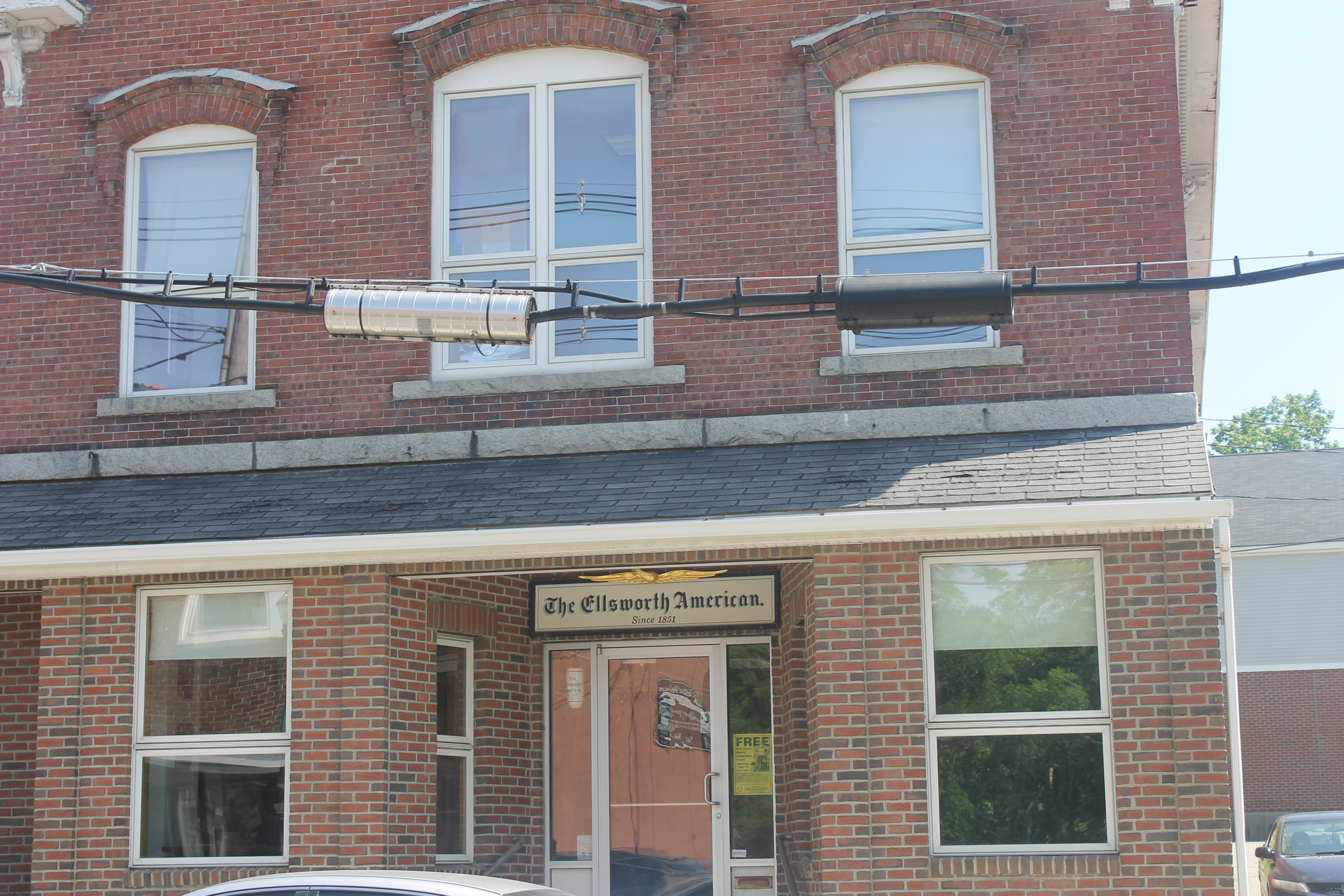
The Ellsworth American newspaper has operated since 1851.

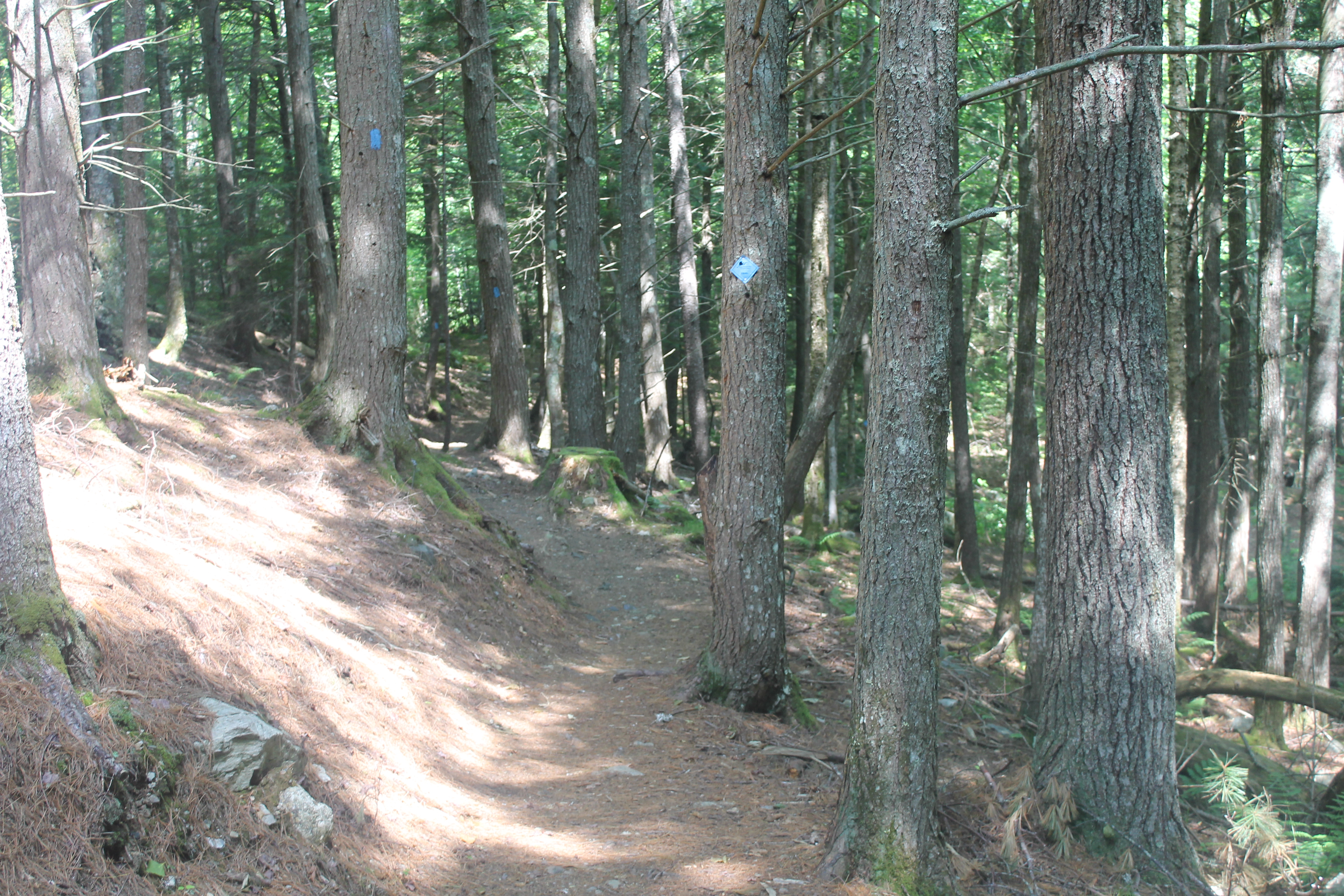
A glimpse of Indian Point Preserve Trail, a rural enclave in Ellsworth

Ellsworth is a city in and the county seat of Hancock County, Maine, United States. The 2020 Census determined it had a population of 8,399. Named after United States Founding Father Oliver Ellsworth, it contains historic buildings and other points of interest, and is close to Acadia National Park.

== History ==
=== Early history and indigenous peoples ===
According to the history of the Passamaquoddy people, the Ellsworth area was originally inhabited by members of the Passamaquoddy and Penobscot tribes: "Both groups speak closely related Algonquian languages, although anthropologists generally group the Passamaquoddies linguistically with the Maliseets and the Penobscots with the Abenakis."

The first European who made definite mention of the area was Thevet, a French explorer, in 1556. Martin Pring and Captain Weymouth, the English explorers, sailed along the shores of Penobscot Bay in 1603 and 1605, and DeMonts, the Frenchman, explored some portions of the coast in 1604 and 1605. According to George J. Varney's 1886 Gazetteer of the State of Maine, there is a tradition that Rosier, the historian of Weymouth's expedition, explored Deer Island thoroughfare, making a halt at the bold promontory in Brooksville, known as Cape Rosier. They found the county occupied by a tribe of Indians, who with those on Passamaquoddy waters, were noted for their long journeys in canoes; whence the general name for these Indians, Etechmins.

=== Colonial period (1604–1763) ===
DeMonts claimed the country in the name of the King of France in the true Catholic style, setting up a cross and calling the country "Acadie." By this name it continued to be known until the capture of Quebec by General James Wolfe in 1759. When Weymouth came in 1605, he also claimed the country in the name of his King, James I of England. Thus the two leading powers of Europe became adverse claimants of the soil of Hancock County, and the wars these claims occasioned kept the county an almost unbroken wilderness during the provincial history of Maine.

It is likely that the French who founded a colony at Somes Sound on Mount Desert Island in 1613, under the patronage of Madame de Guercheville, explored the Ellsworth area and what is now the watershed of the Union River. Varney believes that there were French settlements of some kind or another as close to Ellsworth as Trenton, Oak Point, Newbury Neck and Surry. The French named this colony Saint-Sauveur.

The Ellsworth area was disputed between the English and the French throughout the 17th century and well into the 18th century, occasioning intermittent warfare which was known to the English as the French and Indian Wars. Native American inhabitants may have converted to Roman Catholicism and fought with the French against the British until the fall of Quebec City to the British in 1759. After the 1763 signing of the Treaty of Paris by the governments of the United Kingdom, France, Spain and Portugal, Ellsworth became part of the Commonwealth of Massachusetts.

=== Settlement and incorporation (1763–1800) ===
The modern history of Ellsworth begins with the settlement of the Union River area around 1763 by a party of English led by entrepreneurs Benjamin Milliken and Benjamin Joy, from present-day southern Maine and New Hampshire, who intended to build dams and sawmills to exploit the area's timber and water power. They applied for grants offered by the Commonwealth of Massachusetts to encourage settlement of the Hancock County area. Historian Albert H. Davis in his History of Ellsworth, Maine, published in Lewiston, Maine, in 1927, relates what is known of this early expedition and points to the northern end of the present Water Street, just to the south of the present bridge across the Union River, as the site of the earlier crude buildings erected by the pioneers.

The first grants of land in the county were six townships, each six miles square, between the rivers Penobscot and Union (then known as the Donaqua), which were granted to David Marsh et al., by the General Court of Massachusetts, upon conditions, one of which was that they should settle each township with 60 Protestant families within six years. These grants were No. 1, Bucksport; 2, Orland; 3, Penobscot; 4, Sedgwick; 5, Blue Hill; and 6, Surry. Six other townships east of the Union River were granted on the same terms; three of which are in this county, viz.: No. 1, Trenton, granted to Eben Thorndike, et al.; 2, Sullivan, to David Bean, et al.; and 3, Mount Desert (Island) to Governor Bernard. The surveys were made by Samuel Livermore; and as there were three of the townships on each side of the river, it gave rise to the name which the stream now bears.

In 1773 the first schooner was built at Ellsworth. This was the Susan and Abigail, named after daughters of the two most prominent citizens, American Loyalist Benjamin Milliken and Benjamin Joy. The vessel carried pine shingles and oak staves in annual voyages to the West Indies. In the years up to the beginning of the 20th century, many schooners of various sizes were built in Ellsworth shipyards along the Union River.

Oliver Ellsworth

Albert Davis records that in the latter part of the 18th century, Ellsworth was known as the Union River Settlement and was adjacent to the settlements of Surry (to the east) and Trenton (to the south). Later it was organized as Plantation No. 7 and at times called Bowdoin and New Bowdoin. In 1798 the inhabitants petitioned to be incorporated under the name Sumner. That name having been already taken by a settlement in present-day Oxford County, Maine, the town was incorporated by the Commonwealth of Massachusetts in 1800 as Ellsworth, named for Oliver Ellsworth, the Connecticut delegate to the 1787 National Convention that was then working on a Constitution for the new United States of America, and later the third Chief Justice of the Supreme Court. Oliver Ellsworth had proposed the use of "the United States" to identify the government under the authority of the Constitution during the Constitutional Convention proceedings beginning on June 20, 1787.

Davis reports that in the late 1770s, there were British raids on the Union River Settlement, with attempts to appropriate local cattle. However, there were no formal battles in the Ellsworth area during the Revolutionary War.

=== Early statehood and growth (1800–1860) ===
In 1838, Ellsworth became the county seat of Hancock County, replacing Castine. The 1838 county buildings still stand, west of the Union River, on Bridge Hill.

By 1859, when the town's population was 4,009, Ellsworth had developed into a significant industrial center. Industries included nine sawmills, two gristmills, one tannery, one carding machine, one pottery maker, eight brickyards, thirteen shipbuilders, five pail factories, two edge tool factories, one carriage manufacturer and eight box-making establishments.

=== Civil War era and late 19th century (1860–1900) ===
Between 1860 and 1865, Ellsworth sent 653 soldiers to fight in the Civil War, according to historian Albert Davis. This was at a time when there were only 847 (male) voters in the area. Military training was held in front of the county buildings on Bridge Hill, west of the Union River, at the site of the present Civil War Monument.

In 1869, Ellsworth was incorporated as a city by the Maine Legislature. The first City Hall was Hancock Hall, which stood at the corner of Main Street and School Street. It was destroyed by the Great Ellsworth Fire of 1933.

In 1888, electricity was introduced into the Ellsworth area.

The disputed city elections in 1896 resulted in the appointment of two separate Ellsworth police forces, each of which threatened to arrest the other.

=== 20th century: challenges and modernization (1900–present) ===
Work on the Ellsworth hydro-electric dam began in 1907, at the site of one of the original Benjamin Milliken Union River dams. This led to the creation of the present Leonard's Lake just north of the city.

Ellsworth's first major disaster of the 20th century was the Great Flood of 1923. A spring freshet rushed over the dam and carried off the metal Union River Bridge, along with many buildings along the river, such as the Dirigo Theater, the Foundry and many wharves and warehouses. This event marked the end of Ellsworth's prominence as a shipping center. The present concrete bridge was finished in 1924.

The Great Fire of 1933 destroyed most of Ellsworth's downtown commercial district, on the east side of the Union River. New buildings were built in brick, mainly in Art Deco style. The unique Ellsworth City Hall dates from this period. Many old houses outside the business district survived the conflagration.

The 1960s and 1970s saw the development of an Ellsworth business district on High Street, which is the direct route to and from Bar Harbor and Acadia National Park. This area is now the largest shopping district in Hancock County, with several shopping centers and many large stores, stretching nearly to the Ellsworth-Trenton boundary.

=== Historical images ===
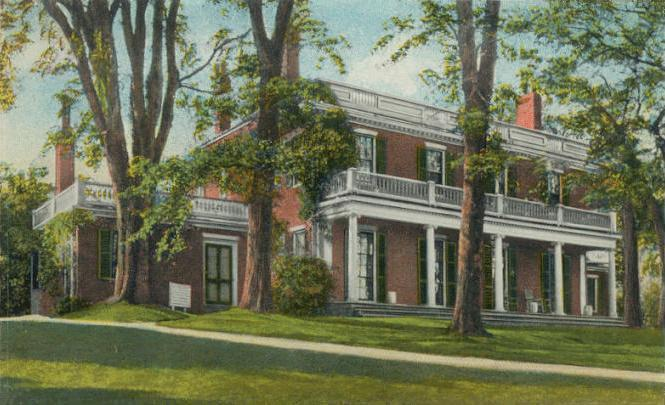
Col. John Black House, built 1824–1827 after a pattern book design by Asher Benjamin; now part of Woodlawn Museum.

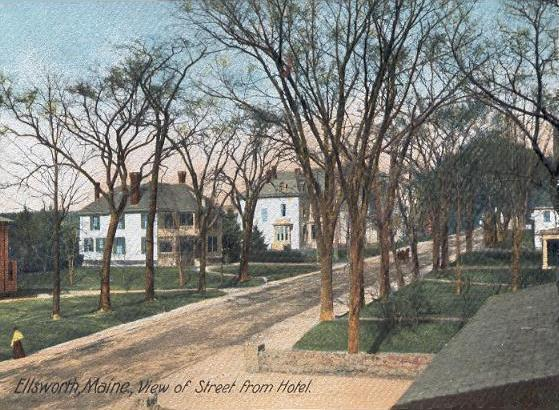
Street scene c. 1905

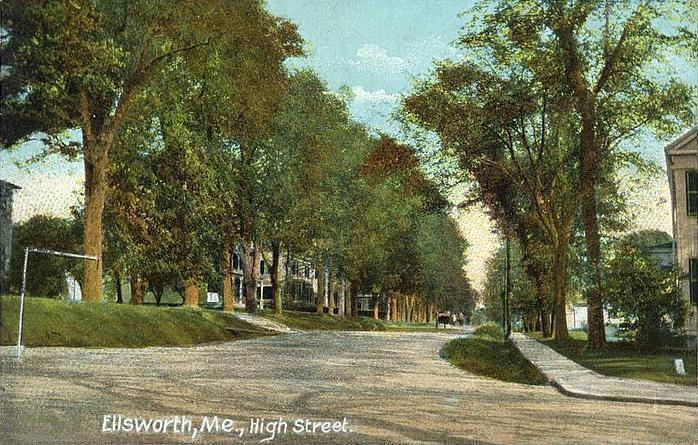
High Street in 1907

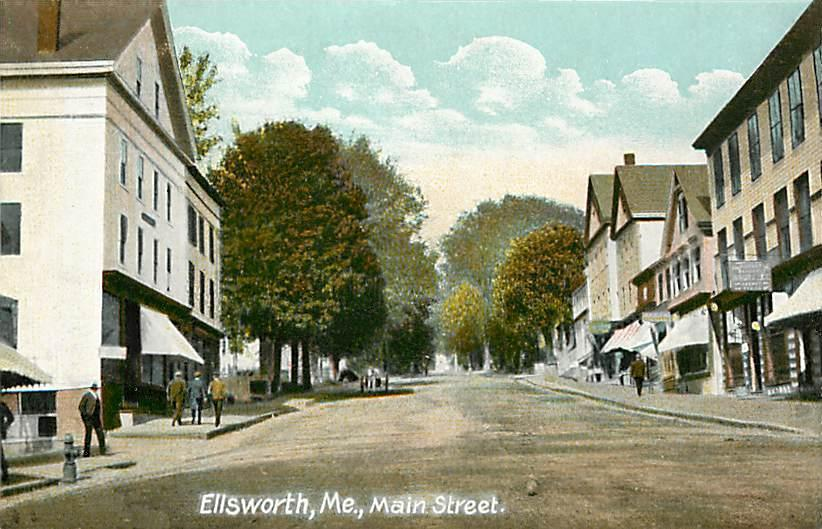
View of Main Street in 1907.

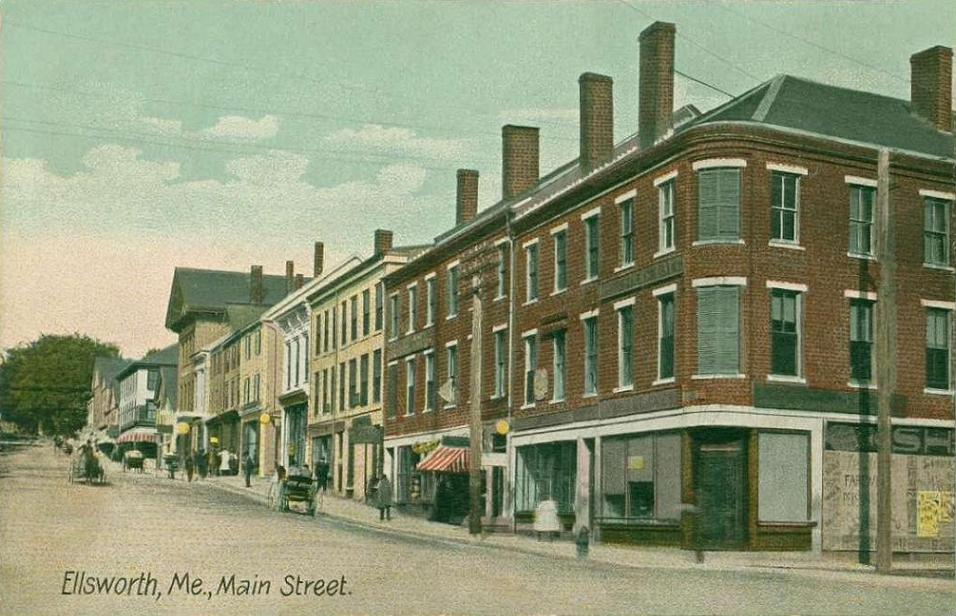
Main Street in 1910.

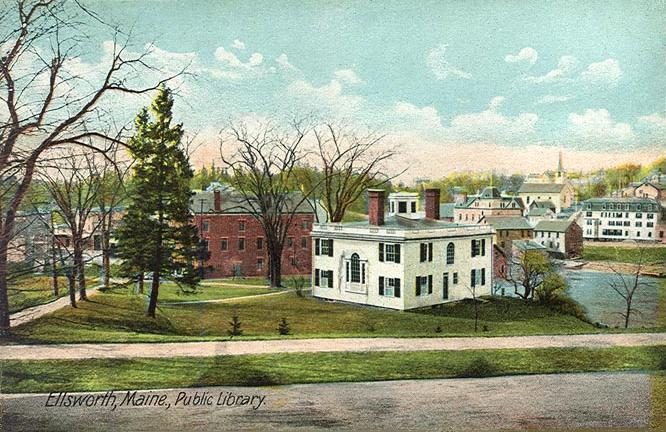
Ellsworth Public Library

== Geography ==
According to the United States Census Bureau, the city has a total area of 93.92 sq mi (243.25 km^{2}), of which 79.28 sq mi (205.33 km^{2}) is land and 14.64 sq mi (37.92 km^{2}) is water. Located at the head of navigation, Ellsworth is drained by the Union River. Ellsworth Falls is the location of the Agassiz Outcrop Maine Geological Survey: Maine ACF, a National Historic Landmark, notable for its early recognition as evidence of glaciation.

The city is served by U.S. Route 1 and U.S. Route 1A, in addition to state routes 3, 172, 179, 180, 184 and 230.

=== Climate ===
Ellsworth has a humid continental climate (Köppen: Dfb) of the warm summer type. As much of Maine winters are harsh and snowy throughout the season, even being at latitudes similar to southern France, such discrepancies are due to the western patterns and the Labrador Current. In places to the northwest of the city, as around Branch Lake, the USDA hardiness zone is 5a, while in the urban area it is 5b, as is much of the state's coastline.

== Demographics ==
Historical population
Census	Pop.	Note	%±
1800	227		—
1810	614		170.5%
1820	892		45.3%
1830	1,385		55.3%
1840	2,263		63.4%
1850	4,009		77.2%
1860	4,658		16.2%
1870	5,257		12.9%
1880	5,052		−3.9%
1890	4,804		−4.9%
1900	4,297		−10.6%
1910	3,549		−17.4%
1920	3,058		−13.8%
1930	3,557		16.3%
1940	3,911		10.0%
1950	3,936		0.6%
1960	4,444		12.9%
1970	4,603		3.6%
1980	5,179		12.5%
1990	5,975		15.4%
2000	6,456		8.1%
2010	7,741		19.9%
2020	8,399		8.5%
U.S. Decennial Census

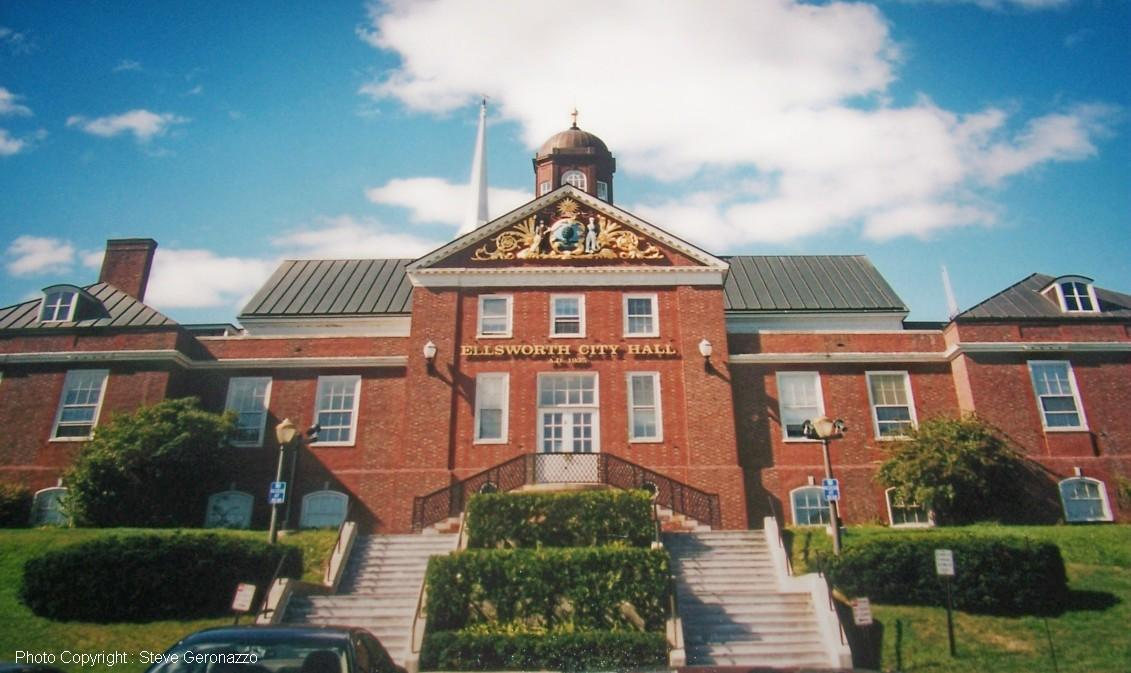
Ellsworth City Hall (1935)

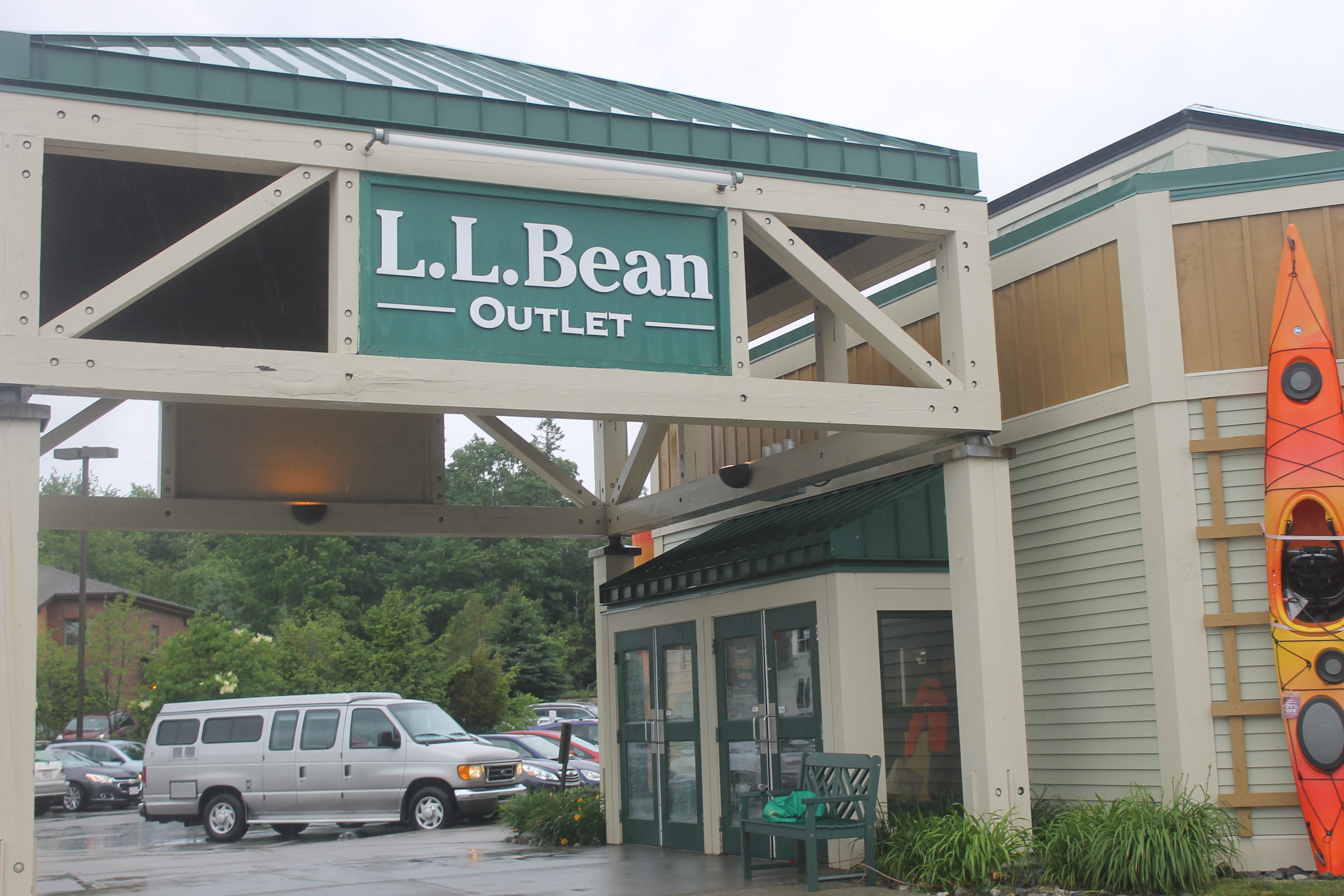
L.L. Bean Outlet in Ellsworth

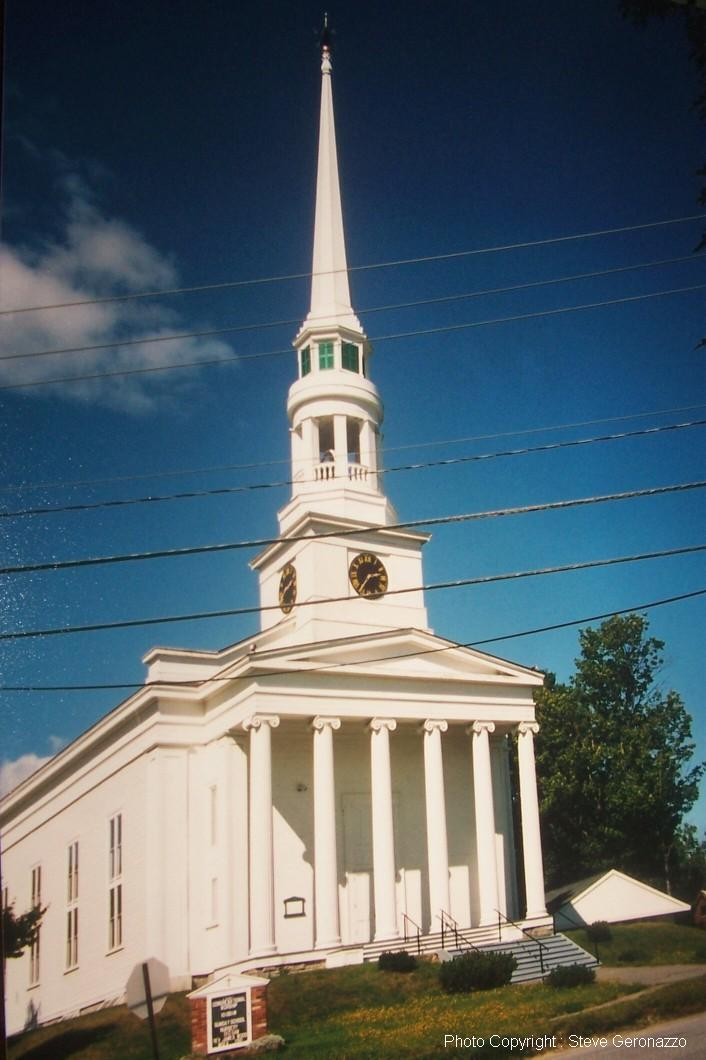
The First Congregational Church of Ellsworth is a United Church of Christ congregation.

=== 2020 census ===
As of the 2020 census, Ellsworth had a population of 8,399. The median age was 44.4 years. 19.6% of residents were under the age of 18 and 22.1% were 65 years of age or older. For every 100 females, there were 92.4 males, and for every 100 females age 18 and over, there were 89.1 males age 18 and over.

0.0% of residents lived in urban areas, while 100.0% lived in rural areas.

There were 3,680 households in Ellsworth, of which 24.0% had children under the age of 18 living in them. Of all households, 43.2% were married-couple households, 18.4% were households with a male householder and no spouse or partner present, and 28.6% were households with a female householder and no spouse or partner present. About 33.6% of all households were made up of individuals, and 15.1% had someone living alone who was 65 years of age or older.

There were 4,584 housing units, of which 19.7% were vacant. The homeowner vacancy rate was 2.4% and the rental vacancy rate was 6.2%.

Racial composition as of the 2020 census
Race	Number	Percent
White	7,663	91.2%
Black or African American	90	1.1%
American Indian and Alaska Native	48	0.6%
Asian	118	1.4%
Native Hawaiian and Other Pacific Islander	1	0.0%
Some other race	53	0.6%
Two or more races	426	5.1%
Hispanic or Latino (of any race)	183	2.2%

=== 2010 census ===
As of the census of 2010, there were 7,741 people, 3,305 households, and 2,048 families residing in the city. The population density was 97.6/sq mi (37.7/km^{2}). There were 4,240 housing units at an average density of 53.5/sq mi (20.7/km^{2}). The racial makeup of the city was 96.7% White, 0.7% African American, 0.4% Native American, 1.1% Asian, 0.1% Pacific Islander, 0.3% from other races, and 0.9% from two or more races. Hispanic or Latino of any race were 1.4% of the population.

There were 3,305 households, of which 29.3% had children under the age of 18 living with them, 47.0% were married couples living together, 10.6% had a female householder with no husband present, 4.3% had a male householder with no wife present, and 38.0% were non-families. 30.2% of all households were made up of individuals, and 12% had someone living alone who was 65 years of age or older. The average household size was 2.27 and the average family size was 2.81.

The median age in the city was 41.9 years. 21.5% of residents were under the age of 18; 7.1% were between the ages of 18 and 24; 25.3% were from 25 to 44; 29.9% were from 45 to 64; and 16.1% were 65 years of age or older. The gender makeup of the city was 47.5% male and 52.5% female.

=== 2000 census ===
In the 2000 census, there were 6,456 people, 2,755 households, and 1,782 families in the city. The population density was 81.5/sq mi (31.5/km^{2}). There were 3,442 housing units at an average density of 43.4/sq mi (16.8/km^{2}). The racial makeup ofwas 97.79% White, 0.19% African American, 0.29% Native American, 0.42% Asian, 0.03% Pacific Islander, 0.29% from other races, and 0.99% from two or more races. 0.65% of the population were Hispanic or Latino of any race.

There were 2,755 households, of which 27.7% had children under 18 living with them, 51.4% were married couples living together, 10.1% had a female householder with no husband present, and 35.3% were non-families. 29.1% of all households were made up of individuals, and 11.8% had someone living alone 65 years or older. The average household size was 2.26 and the average family size 2.75.

In the city, the population was 21.9% under 18, 6.7% from 18 to 24, 29.0% from 25 to 44, 25.2% from 45 to 64, and 17.2% who were 65 or older. The median age was 40. For every 100 females, there were 88.3 males. For every 100 females age 18 and over, there were 86.4 males.

The median income for a household was $35,938, and the median for a family $41,884. Males had a median of $31,455 versus $22,188 for females. The per capita income for the city was $21,049. 9.2% of the population and 5.7% of families were below the poverty line. 9.4% of those under 18 and 8.3% of those 65 and older were below the poverty line.

== Education ==
Ellsworth High School is in Ellsworth, Maine, and is the only high school in the Ellsworth Public Schools. Shenna Bellows, who later became the 50th Secretary of State of Maine, graduated from Ellsworth High School in 1993, and was later inducted into the Ellsworth High School Hall of Fame.

== Sites of interest ==
- Birdsacre—Stanwood Homestead Museum & Wildlife Sanctuary
- Ellsworth Historical Society Building
- Ellsworth Public Library
- The Grand—performing arts theatre, listed on the National Register of Historic Places (NRHP)
- Telephone Museum
- Woodlawn Museum—the Black House, NRHP-listed

== Notable people ==
- Johannes Bapst, missionary and educator
- Robert H. Crosthwaite, state representative and city councilor
- Curt Fullerton, MLB baseball player
- Nicole Grohoski, State Senator
- Eugene Hale, U.S. Senator
- Marsden Hartley, painter
- Jordon Hudson (born 2001), pageant contestant
- Brian Langley, State Senator
- Clarence Cook Little, geneticist
- Louis Luchini (born 1981), State Senator
- Asa McGray, Free Will Baptist minister
- Betsy Flagg Melcher, artist
- Benjamin Milliken (1728-1791), American Loyalist and founder of Ellsworth (fled to Canada)
- Bryant Moore (1894-1951) United States Army major general
- Frank A. Moore (1844–1918), politician and judge
- John A. Peters (1822–1904), U.S. Congressman
- John A. Peters (1864–1953), U.S. Congressman (nephew of John A. Peters of 1822)
- Graham Platner, oyster farmer, harbormaster, and withdrawn candidate for the U.S. senate
- Darryl Pollard (born 1964), NFL football player
- Fulton J. Redman, state Congressman and candidate for the US Senate and Governor
- Dick Scott (born 1962), MLB shortstop with the Oakland Athletics
- Cordelia Stanwood, teacher, ornithologist, and wildlife photographer
- Tim Sylvia, former UFC Heavyweight champion
- Mary Agnes Tincker, novelist
- John Hay Whitney, publisher and ambassador
- James Worth (born 1948), better known as J. Mark Worth, state representative and resident of Ellsworth
