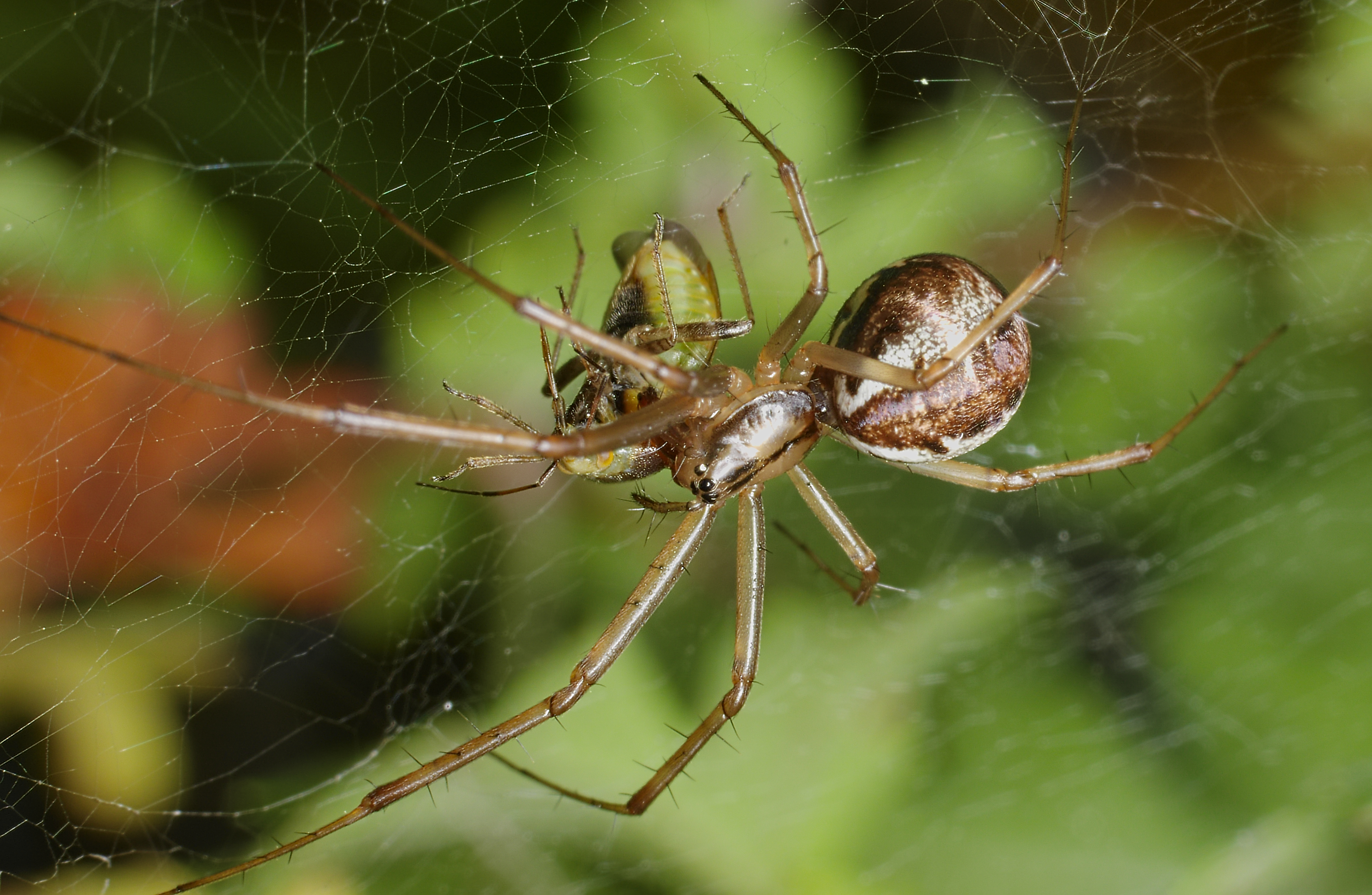

Scientific classification
- Kingdom: Animalia
- Phylum: Arthropoda
- Subphylum: Chelicerata
- Class: Arachnida
- Order: Araneae
- Infraorder: Araneomorphae
- Family: Linyphiidae
- Genus: Linyphia
- Species: L. triangularis

Binomial name
- Linyphia triangularis (Clerck, 1758)

= Linyphia triangularis =

Species of spider

Linyphia triangularis is a European species of spider in the family Linyphiidae first described by Carl Alexander Clerck in his 1758 Svenska Spindlar.

== Description ==
Linyphia triangularis grows up to 6 millimetres (0.24 in) long. The carapace is pale brown with darker markings along the edges and down the centre line; the opisthosoma has a coarsely serrate brown band against a white background, with further brown markings along the sides. The legs are greyish brown, and bear many long spines.

== Distribution ==
Linyphia triangularis is abundant throughout Europe. It has been introduced to the U.S. state of Maine, having been first reported there on 28 August 1983 at Stover Corner. It has been recorded from at least 15 of the state's 16 counties, and is now abundant within Acadia National Park and some other coastal parts of the state.

== Ecology ==
Mating behaviour

Linyphia triangularis lives in a wide range of habitats, where it may be found among low bushes and vegetation. It spins a horizontal sheet-web, and rests on the underside of the web for its prey. Adults are active in the late summer and autumn. The prey are snared by "barrage lines" above the web, and fall onto the horizontal sheet, where they are killed by L. triangularis, but are not wrapped in silk.
