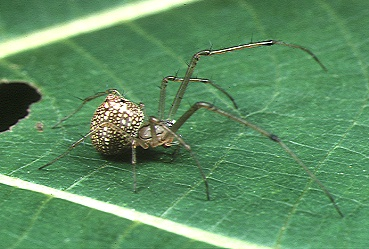
- female from Okinawa
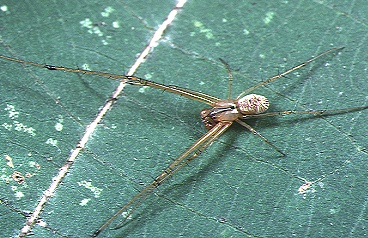
- male from Okinawa

Scientific classification
- Kingdom: Animalia
- Phylum: Arthropoda
- Subphylum: Chelicerata
- Class: Arachnida
- Order: Araneae
- Infraorder: Araneomorphae
- Family: Tetragnathidae
- Genus: Tylorida
- Species: T. striata

Binomial name
- Tylorida striata (Thorell, 1877)

Synonyms
- Meta striata Thorell, 1877; Meta stellimicans Simon, 1885; Argyroepeira bigibba Thorell, 1887; Argyroepeira striata Thorell, 1887; Tylorida stellimicans Simon, 1894; Tylorida magniventer Bösenberg & Strand, 1906; Linyphia nicobarensis Tikader, 1977; Sternospina concretipalpis Schmidt & Krause, 1993; Tylorida nicobarensis Breitling, 2015

= Tylorida striata =

Striated Tylorida

Species of spider

Tylorida striata is a species of spider in the family Tetragnathidae. It was first described by Tamerlan Thorell in 1877. The species has a wide distribution across tropical Asia and northern Australia.

== Taxonomy ==
T. striata was originally described as Meta striata by Thorell in 1877 based on a female specimen. The species has undergone numerous taxonomic revisions and has accumulated several synonyms over time. Notable synonymizations include Tylorida magniventer (Bösenberg & Strand, 1906), which was synonymized by Tanikawa in 2005, and Sternospina concretipalpis (Schmidt & Krause, 1993), which was synonymized by Dimitrov et al. in 2008.

Most recently, Sankaran et al. (2017) synonymized Tylorida nicobarensis, which had been transferred from the genus Linyphia by Breitling in 2015.

== Distribution ==
T. striata has been recorded from the Comoros, India, China, and Southeast Asia extending to northern Australia (Queensland). The species is widely distributed across tropical and subtropical regions of Asia, with records from countries including Japan, Philippines, Malaysia, Indonesia, and various islands in the Indo-Pacific region.

== Description ==
T. striata shows sexual dimorphism typical of many orb-weaving spiders. Female specimens range in body length from 3.75 to 4.97 mm. The species can be distinguished from related species by specific morphological features, including the absence of ventral cone-like macrosetae on the male tibiae I and II, metatarsi and tarsi.

The spider displays characteristic body coloration and patterning, with paired tubercles present on the apex of the abdomen. The species constructs typical orb webs and has been observed in various habitats across its range.
