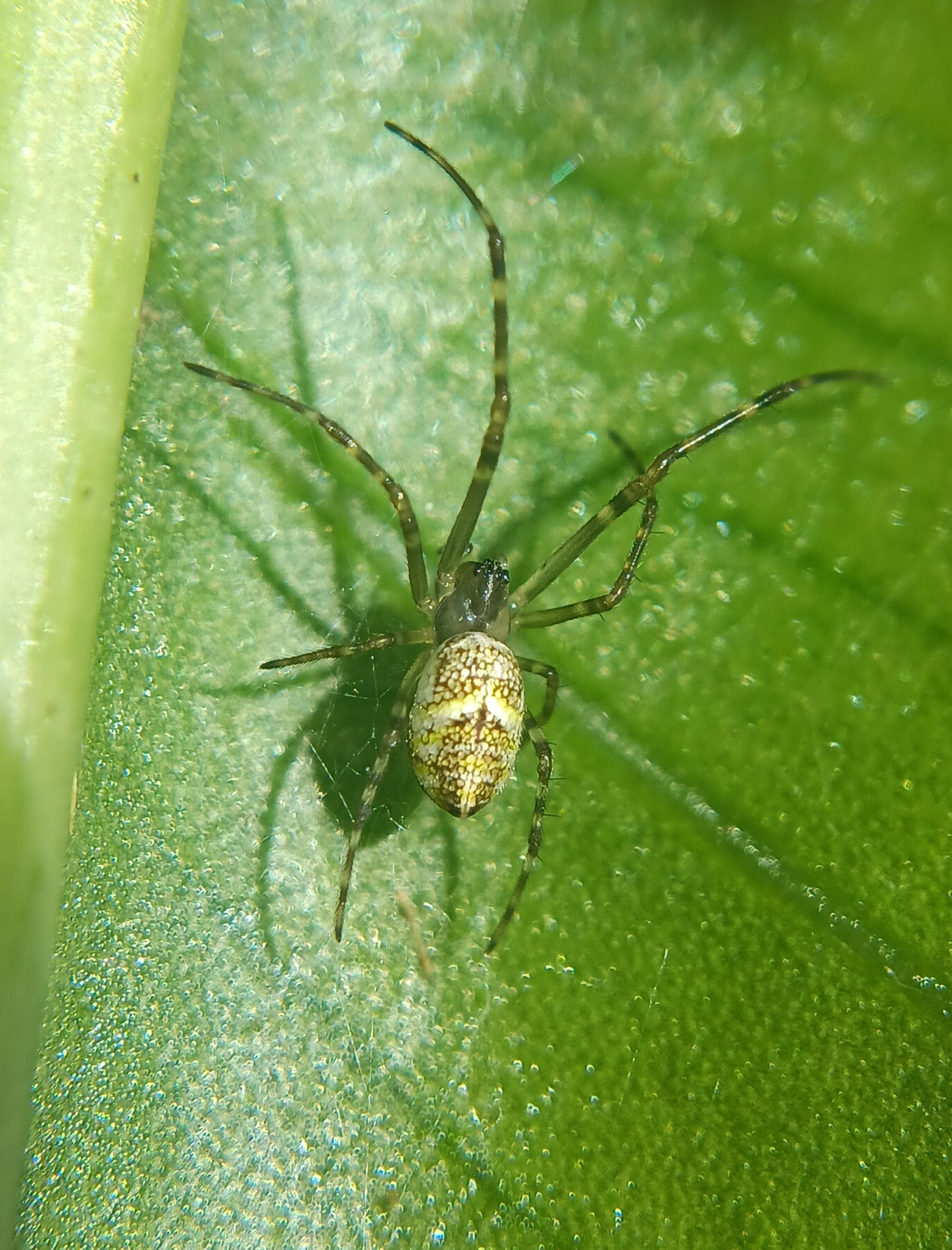
- female from the Philippines

Scientific classification
- Kingdom: Animalia
- Phylum: Arthropoda
- Subphylum: Chelicerata
- Class: Arachnida
- Order: Araneae
- Infraorder: Araneomorphae
- Family: Tetragnathidae
- Genus: Tylorida
- Species: T. ventralis

Binomial name
- Tylorida ventralis (Thorell, 1877)

Synonyms
- Meta ventralis Thorell, 1877; Argyroepeira ventralis (Thorell, 1887); Leucauge ventralis (Pocock, 1904); Anopas ventralis (Archer, 1951); Leucauge pondae Tikader, 1970; Leucauge sphenoida Wang, 1991

= Tylorida ventralis =

Big-bellied Tylorida

Species of spider

Tylorida ventralis is a species of long-jawed orb weaver spider in the family Tetragnathidae. It has a wide distribution ranging from Pakistan and India to Japan, Taiwan, and New Guinea.

== Taxonomy ==
The species was originally described by Tamerlan Thorell in 1877 as Meta ventralis from specimens collected in Kendari, Southeast Sulawesi, Indonesia. It was subsequently placed in various genera including Argyroepeira, Leucauge, and Anopas before being transferred to Tylorida by Chrysanthus in 1975.

Two former species, Leucauge pondae Tikader, 1970 and Leucauge sphenoida Wang, 1991, were synonymized with T. ventralis in 2002 and 2017 respectively.

== Distribution ==
T. ventralis has been recorded from Pakistan, India, China, Myanmar, Thailand, Laos, Japan, Taiwan, and New Guinea. The species shows a wide distribution across tropical and subtropical Asia, with records spanning from the Indian subcontinent through Southeast Asia to the Western Pacific.

== Description ==
T. ventralis exhibits considerable intraspecific variation in coloration, with two main color morphs recognized: Silver and Yellow morphs, along with three distinct varieties. The original description by Thorell describes females with a body length of approximately 7 millimeters and males around 4.75 millimeters.

The female has a pale testaceous cephalothorax with darkened lateral margins and a median longitudinal band on the thoracic part. The abdomen is oblong when viewed from the side, with a broadly truncated posterior end and the upper-posterior angle elevated into a small tubercle or cone. The abdomen shows a sub-testaceous or greyish coloration with white and black spots scattered across the surface. The ventral side displays two large sub-rectangular black spots along the midline and irregular black spots on each side.

Males are longer and narrower than females, with longer legs. The male chelicerae are distinctive, being narrower and slightly longer than in females, with a strong tooth on the inner side. The palps are long and slender with a large, thick, shortly sub-ovate bulb.
