= Acadia Night Sky Festival =

Annual event in Maine, United States

The Acadia Night Sky Festival was an annual celebration of the starlit skies above Acadia National Park on Maine's Mount Desert Island and the Schoodic Peninsula. The festival takes place every September.

Hosted by the Bar Harbor Chamber of Commerce and other local organizations, the festival attracted speakers, researchers, photographers, and artists to the area, in addition to dozens of workshops. Stargazing is one popular activity, with the view of the Milky Way notable in late summer and early fall. Acadia has been described as one of the top national parks for celestial views.

In 2023, the National Park Service held "Acadia Night Sky Week," a series of free public programs for visitors. The NPS provided shuttle services to the festival.

The Acadia Night Sky Festival in Maine is no longer active and officially concluded in 2022.
