= Great Head Trail =

Trail in Acadia National Park, Maine, USA

Great Head Trail is a trail 1.4 miles (2.3 km) long. The trail is located in Acadia National Park in Maine on the Great Head Peninsula.

== The Trail ==
Great Head Trail is rated as a moderate difficulty. At a distance of 1.4 miles this trail wraps around the Great Head Peninsula on the east side of Sand Beach in Acadia National Park. From the parking area located on the left side of Park Loop Road granite steps lead down to Sand Beach. Ahead of you are the cliffs head in that direction towards the trail. It is recommended to walk on the compressed sand next to the beach, this is a much easier walk. Close to the base of a rocky outcropping called The Bee Hive is a reflected tidal pool. Many hikers climb the 520 ft (158 m) summit. At the top of the summit it is a very nice easy hike to Great head where there is a beautiful view of the rocky coast, the ocean below, and Otter Point.

== Otter Point ==
The summit of Great Head Trail overlooks the western promontory, Otter Point. The slightly smaller Otter Cliffs rise over a rocky shore that lines the southern shore. A forest of spruce trees and Otter Cove create a beautiful secluded area, great for hiking and camping. One of the finest drives in the park, Park Loop Road, loops around Otter Point, providing scenes of ocean, dark forest, pink granite, and spectacular, glistening light. There are some old remnants of cottages as well as an old U.S. Naval Radio Station, which have now become the Fabbri rest area.

== History ==
Originally the Great Head/Sand Beach lot was part of a grant given by the Massachusetts General Court to the De Gregories. Eventually the property was sold to Louisa P. Satterlee of Manhattan for $100. The property is made up of 166 acres and includes much forest land and a sand beach. When Louisa died in October 1946 she left the property to her husband, Herbert L. Satterlee, who then died in the spring of 1947 giving the land to his daughter Eleanor Morgan Satterlee. Eleanor eventually conveyed the land to the United States Government on May 25, 1949. That is when the land became Acadia National Park.

== Statistics ==
Activity Type:	Hiking
Nearby City:	Bar Harbor
Length:	1.5 total miles
Elevation Gain:	200 feet
Trail Type:	Loop
Skill Level:	Easy for children
Duration:	1.5 hours
Season:	April–October
Top Elevation:	160 feet
Local Contacts:	Acadia National Park
