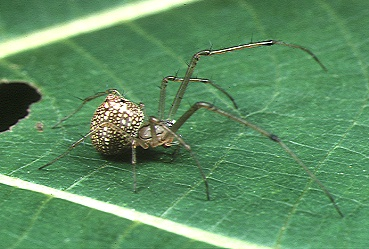
- Tylorida striata female

Scientific classification
- Kingdom: Animalia
- Phylum: Arthropoda
- Subphylum: Chelicerata
- Class: Arachnida
- Order: Araneae
- Infraorder: Araneomorphae
- Family: Tetragnathidae
- Genus: Tylorida; Simon, 1894

Type species
- T. striata (Thorell, 1877)

Species
- 8, see text

Synonyms
- Anopas Archer, 1951; Sternospina Schmidt & Krause, 1993

= Tylorida =

Genus of spiders

Tylorida is a genus of long-jawed orb-weavers that was first described by Eugène Louis Simon in 1894.

== Species ==
As of November 2019 it contains eight species, found in Oceania, Africa, and Asia:

- Tylorida flava Sankaran, Malamel, Joseph & Sebastian, 2017 – India
- Tylorida marmorea (Pocock, 1901) – India, China
- Tylorida mengla Zhu, Song & Zhang, 2003 – China
- Tylorida mornensis (Benoit, 1978) – Seychelles
- Tylorida seriata Thorell, 1899 – West Africa, Cameroon
- Tylorida striata (Thorell, 1877) (type) – Comoros, India, China, SE Asia to Australia (Queensland)
- Tylorida tianlin Zhu, Song & Zhang, 2003 – China, Laos
- Tylorida ventralis (Thorell, 1877) – India to Taiwan, Japan, New Guinea

In synonymy:

- T. concretipalpis (Schmidt & Krause, 1993) = Tylorida striata (Thorell, 1877)
- T. cylindrata (Wang, 1991) = Tylorida marmorea (Pocock, 1901)
- T. magniventer Bösenberg & Strand, 1906 = Tylorida striata (Thorell, 1877)
- T. nicobarensis (Tikader, 1977) = Tylorida striata (Thorell, 1877)
- T. pondae (Tikader, 1970) = Tylorida ventralis (Thorell, 1877)
- T. sataraensis Kulkarni, 2014 = Tylorida marmorea (Pocock, 1901)
- T. sphenoida (Wang, 1991) = Tylorida ventralis (Thorell, 1877)
- T. stellimicans (Simon, 1885) = Tylorida striata (Thorell, 1877)
