= George Dorr =

American preservationist

- Dorr on the Beachcroft Path at Huguenot Head in the first part of the 20th century
- Born: George Bucknam Dorr; December 29, 1853; Jamaica Plain, Massachusetts, U.S.
- Died: August 5, 1944 (aged 90); Bar Harbor, Maine, U.S.
- Occupation: Preservationist

George Bucknam Dorr (December 29, 1853 – August 5, 1944) was an American preservationist. Known as the "father of Acadia National Park," he spent most of his adult life overseeing the park's formation and expansion.

Charles William Eliot called the first meeting of what would evolve into the Hancock County Trustees of Public Reservations in 1901, but it was Dorr's vision that ensured the lands would be protected and preserved for future generations.

== Acadia National Park ==
Dorr's rock and spring canopy at Sieur de Monts

Dorr first visited Mount Desert Island as a fifteen-year-old in 1868, on a vacation with his parents. On that visit they decided to buy oceanfront property at Compass Harbor, just outside downtown Bar Harbor. They did not start on the construction of the 58-acre, 30-room Old Farm (also Oldfarm), designed by Maine architect Henry Richards, until 1878, however. The remains of this residence are still visible, the main house having been demolished in 1951. The remains are part of Acadia National Park today, having been accepted into it in 1942. Their summer neighbor was Harvard University president Charles William Elliot.

Dorr purchased a small spring at Sieur de Monts in 1909 and carved the words SWEET WATERS OF ACADIA into a nearby rock. Atop the spring, Maine architect Frederick Lincoln Savage designed an octagonal canopy structure in the Italian Renaissance Revival style.

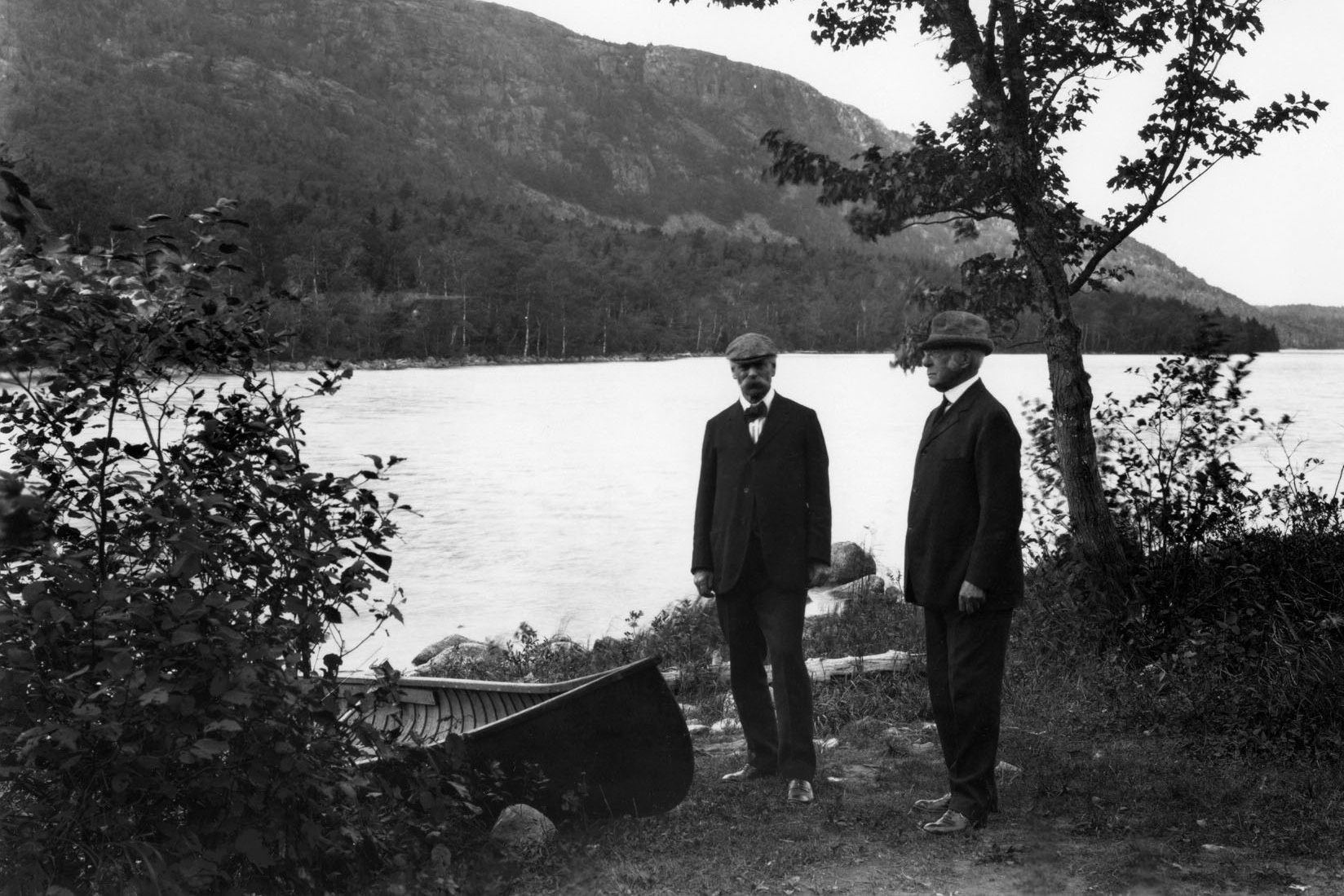
George Dorr and Charles W. Eliot on the shore of Jordan Pond

In 1913 Dorr received word that the Maine Legislature was considering revoking the nonprofit status of the Trustees. He travelled up from Boston, Massachusetts, to Augusta, Maine, and spent several days fighting the measure. He was successful, but he also realized that the lands he had fought hard to own needed the greater protection of the federal government. He was soon on his way to Washington, D.C., meeting with the powers that be.

In 1916, President Woodrow Wilson created Sieur de Monts National Monument. Dorr chose to have Wilson sign off on the national monument status rather than wait for Congress to act on the national park. The National Park Service was established that August, however, and Acadia was designated a national park, under the name Lafayette National Park, in 1919. It was given its current name in 1929. Dorr served as its superintendent from its foundation until his death.

John D. Rockefeller Jr. began construction of a carriage-road system on private land in 1913. It was developed and expanded as public land with the help of Dorr. About 45 miles (72 km) of carriage roads are maintained and accessible within park boundaries. Granite coping stones along carriage road edges act as guard rails; they are nicknamed "Rockefeller's Teeth."

Dorr initially believe that his personal fortune could support purchasing land on behalf of the park forever, but it proved not possible. He had declined any salary except for one dollar a month as the first custodian of the national monument, but after the park became Acadia in 1929, he accepted a regular salary.

Despite income from his highly successful Mount Desert Nurseries, Dorr's inheritance was depleted in the decade preceding the inauguration of Franklin D. Roosevelt as President. Roosevelt's federally-funded social programs allowed the park to develop rapidly.

Saved to future generations as it has been to us, in the wild primeval beauty of the nature it exhibits, of ancient rocks and still more ancient sea, with infinite detail of life and landscape interest between, the spirit and mind of man will surely find in it in the years and centuries to come an inspiration and a means of growth as essential to them ever and anon as are fresh air and sunshine to the body. - George B. Dorr

== Personal life ==
Dorr was born in Jamaica Plain, Massachusetts, in 1853, to Charles Hazen Dorr (1821–1893) and Mary Gray Ward (1820–1901), affluent parents whose textile fortunes he inherited.

He was an 1874 graduate of Harvard University. Dorr's philosophy connections led him to serve on the department's visiting committee for two decades. He also led fundraising for a new building, Emerson Hall, to house the department, as well as helping the university acquire properties between Harvard Yard and the Charles River. He also graduated from the University of Oxford.

Dorr, a lifelong bachelor, swam in Frenchman Bay almost daily. He suffered a heart attack in 1934 during one of these swims and was told he had six months to live; he lived for a further decade, however.

Chronic vision difficulties also plagued Dorr through his life, and he lost his sight in his final years, when he was living an impoverished life in the 1879-built Storm Beach Cottage at Old Farm. Concerned about the future existence of his Old Farm property, Dorr reportedly offered it to Franklin D. Roosevelt as a summer retreat, but the President declined. Maine's tough winters meant the mansion had fallen into disrepair by 1951. A new roof was needed, as well as other structural repairs, estimated to cost around $30,000. After the National Park Service performed part of the demolition, John D. Rockefeller Jr. donated $5,000 to tear the remnants down. Only Storm Beach Cottage remains standing.

== Death ==
Dorr died in 1944, aged 90. In his honor, the National Park Service and the executors of his estate renamed the mountain that overlooks Sieur de Monts Spring as Dorr Mountain. A memorial stone was placed in his family lot at Mount Auburn Cemetery, in his native Massachusetts, where he was cremated; his ashes were returned to Bar Harbor, where they were scattered.

== See also ==
- John Muir
