= Linyphia rita =

Scientific classification
- Domain: Eukaryota
- Kingdom: Animalia
- Phylum: Arthropoda
- Subphylum: Chelicerata
- Class: Arachnida
- Order: Araneae
- Infraorder: Araneomorphae
- Family: Linyphiidae
- Genus: Linyphia
- Species: L. rita

Binomial name
- Linyphia rita Gertsch, 1951

Species of spider

Linyphia rita is a species of sheetweb spider in the family Linyphiidae. It is found in the United States.
