= Blackwoods Campground =

- U.S. National Register of Historic Places
- U.S. Historic district
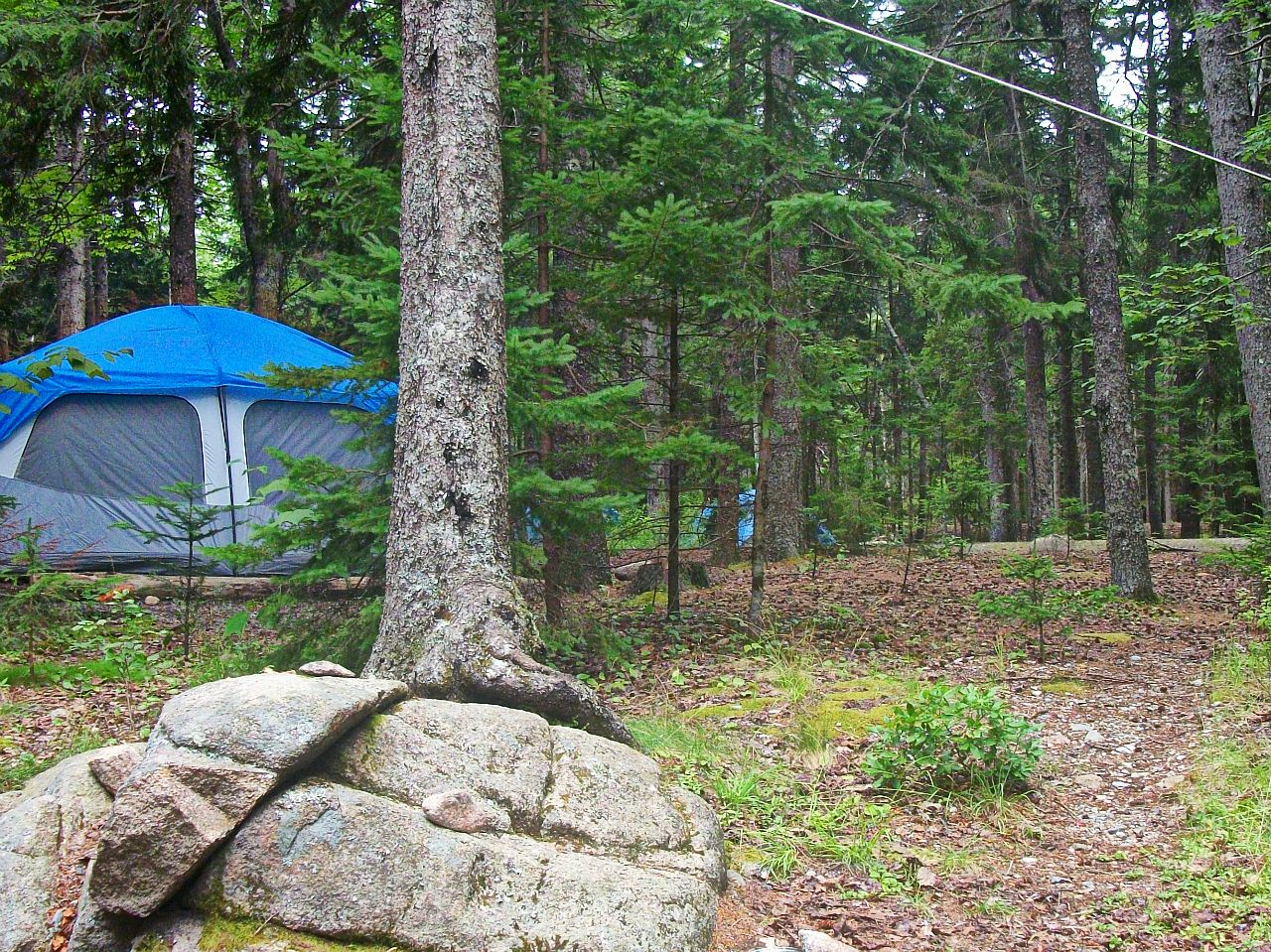
- A campsite at Blackwoods

- Location within Maine Location within the United States
- Nearest city: Bar Harbor, Maine
- Coordinates: 44°18′38″N 68°12′15″W
- Area: 160 acres (65 ha)
- Built: 1935
- Built by: Civilian Conservation Corps et.al.
- Architectural style: Historic Campground
- MPS: Acadia National Park MPS
- NRHP reference No.: 07000612
- Added to NRHP: June 29, 2007

Blackwoods Campground is located on the east side of Mount Desert Island, off Maine State Route 3 in Acadia National Park. Construction on the site was begun by the Civilian Conservation Corps (CCC) in 1935, and reaching its present appearance (with modest alterations since) around 1961, with the completion of Loop B. The campground has 306 individual campsites, several group campsites, and offers only limited amenities, which include potable water and restrooms, but not showers or electrical hookups. Campsites may be reserved up to six months in advance. The portion of the campground built by the CCC, which includes its core and Loop A, was listed on the National Register of Historic Places in 2007.

== Description ==
Acadia National Park is located on Mount Desert Island, just off the coast of central Maine. The island has two large lobes separated by Somes Sound, with the park occupying a large part of the eastern lobe, and a smaller part of the western one. Blackwoods Campground is located at near the southeasternmost point of the eastern lobe, on the western side of Otter Cove, and is accessible via Maine State Route 3.

The campground has a winding access road, which runs south and then west from SR 3, leading to the central administration area, with a checkin station and the camp's "central court". From there, Loop A is located to the west, while Loop B is located to the north. An amphitheater, used for ranger-led activities, is located between the two loops, and there is a short trail leading from Loop A down toward the shore. The campground is separated from the shore by the park's loop road. Loop A has 160 campsites (although this number has historically varied and is subject to change), and is served by six comfort stations. Loop B has about 140 sites, and is served by 5 comfort stations. The campground's water is provided from a tank north of Loop B.

== History ==
Acadia National Park was created in 1916 as the Sieur de Monts National Monument. Master planning for the park in the 1920s included provision for the establishment of campgrounds, reflecting a growing trend in the popularity of camping at that time. Between 1927 and 1932 the park established Beark Brook Campground. Funding for other campgrounds did not arrive until the 1930s, when the Civilian Conservation Corps (CCC) was established to provide jobs and to improve the nation's park infrastructure. Funding for the construction of Blackwoods Campground was secured in 1936. The Blackwoods area, on land given to the park by John D. Rockefeller Jr., was surveyed by a CCC crew and a plan was drafted that included the central court and three loops containing 400 campsites. The design reflected the latest thinking on campground layout, and included provisions for trailer camping, then a relatively recent innovation. Between 1938 and 1942 the CCC built the camp road, the central court, and 100 sites on Loop A. Due to the onset of American participation in World War II, the checkin station was left unfinished.

After the war ended, a few comfort stations were added, as was an amphitheater (which was replaced by the present one in 1975). Loop B was built in the 1960s as part of a funding program celebrating the 50th anniversary of the National Park Service. Since then, only modest changes have been made to the campground. Its access road was widened, and a new checkin station was built in 1978 after the old one was destroyed by fire. The number of campsites has fluctuated over the years, as new sites have been added to the existing loops, and extant sites have in some cases been abandoned, and in other cases been combined. The planned third loop has not been built.

== See also ==
- National Register of Historic Places listings in Hancock County, Maine
- National Register of Historic Places listings in Acadia National Park
