= Charles T. How =

American real-estate developer and lawyer (1840–1909)

- Born: Charles T. How; 1840
- Died: October 8, 1909 (aged 68–69); Prangins, Switzerland
- Occupation(s): Real-estate developer, lawyer

Charles T. How (1840 – October 8, 1909) was an American lawyer and real-estate developer who began the development of mansions (also known as cottages) in Bar Harbor, Maine, in the late 19th century.

== Early life ==
How was born in 1840.

== Career ==
Upon visiting Bar Harbor in 1870, he began the process of buying large amounts of land in and around the town, eventually becoming its largest landowner.

Around a decade later, Bar Harbor's summer population, who visited from the east-coast metropolises, were having cottages built for them, rather than having to book hotel rooms for themselves. These included Blair Eyrie, Mizzentop, Stanwood and The Turrets.

How lived in Boston, at the Brunswick Hotel, during the winter months, and moved north to Bar Harbor for the rest of the year, arriving in early spring to prepare for that year's influx of visitors. He stayed at the Belmont Hotel, which was owned by his brother, John, and nephew, Waldron Bates. His parents and sisters stayed at the Cleftstone.

The chairperson of the Bar Harbor Society for several years, he also founded the Village Improvement Association.

When Bar Harbor's supply of water began to struggle, How founded the Eden Water Company as a competitor to the Bar Harbor Water Company. How's venture did not need to pump any water, for the simple threat of this competition resulted in the established company improving its service.

How also donated what is believed by many to be the first parcel of land in the future Acadia National Park. He gifted Fawn Pond (just to the west of Hulls Cove) to the Village Improvement Association in 1906.

== Death ==
How died while in Prangins, Switzerland, on October 8, 1909. He was aged 68 or 69.

== Legacy ==
The former master bedroom at Bar Harbor's Cleftstone Manor is named for him. In addition, plaques honoring How have been placed at the intersection of Woodbury and Cleftstone Roads and at Fawn Pond.

In 1911, the summer residents of Bar Harbor created a memorial to How in Woodbury Park, a four-acre gift to the town from How, to honor his work in the town.
