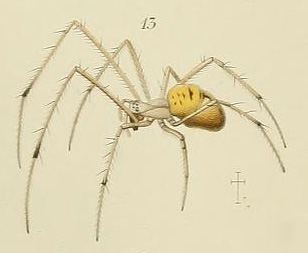
- drawing of female from original description

Scientific classification
- Kingdom: Animalia
- Phylum: Arthropoda
- Subphylum: Chelicerata
- Class: Arachnida
- Order: Araneae
- Infraorder: Araneomorphae
- Family: Linyphiidae
- Genus: Linyphia
- Species: L. sagana

Binomial name
- Linyphia sagana Dönitz & Strand, 1906

= Linyphia sagana =

Species of spider

Linyphia sagana is a species of spider in the family Linyphiidae (sheet weaver spiders). It is endemic to Japan.

== Etymology ==
The species name sagana refers to Saga, a region in Japan, indicating the area where the holotype was collected.

== Taxonomy ==
Linyphia sagana was first described by Friedrich Karl Wilhelm Dönitz and Embrik Strand in 1906 as part of their comprehensive work on Japanese spiders.

== Distribution ==
L. sagana is endemic to Japan, where it was originally discovered and described.

== Description ==
Only the female has been described for this species. The original description by Dönitz and Strand indicates a total length of 5 mm for the female specimen.

The female has a greyish-brown cephalothorax and extremities, with the opisthosoma being yellow above and brown below. A distinctive feature is a hill-like elevation running across the opisthosoma immediately behind the front third, rising gently and sloping steeply behind, with whitish coloration. Along the sides of the abdomen runs a narrow black line, with a somewhat longer black transverse line both in front of and behind the hill-like elevation. The opisthosoma shows inconspicuous black striations on the yellow background, which gradually transitions to brown towards the posterior end and belly.

The brown ventral surface of the opisthosoma displays yellow spots behind the epigyne, becoming darker posteriorly. The sides show beautiful wavy lines that are deeply grooved, and these lines also extend across the posterior section of the abdominal back. The extremity tips of the first pair of legs are black, and all extremities are abundantly but finely haired with scattered black bristles.
