= Acadia National Park =

National park in Maine, United States

- IUCN category V (protected landscape/seascape)
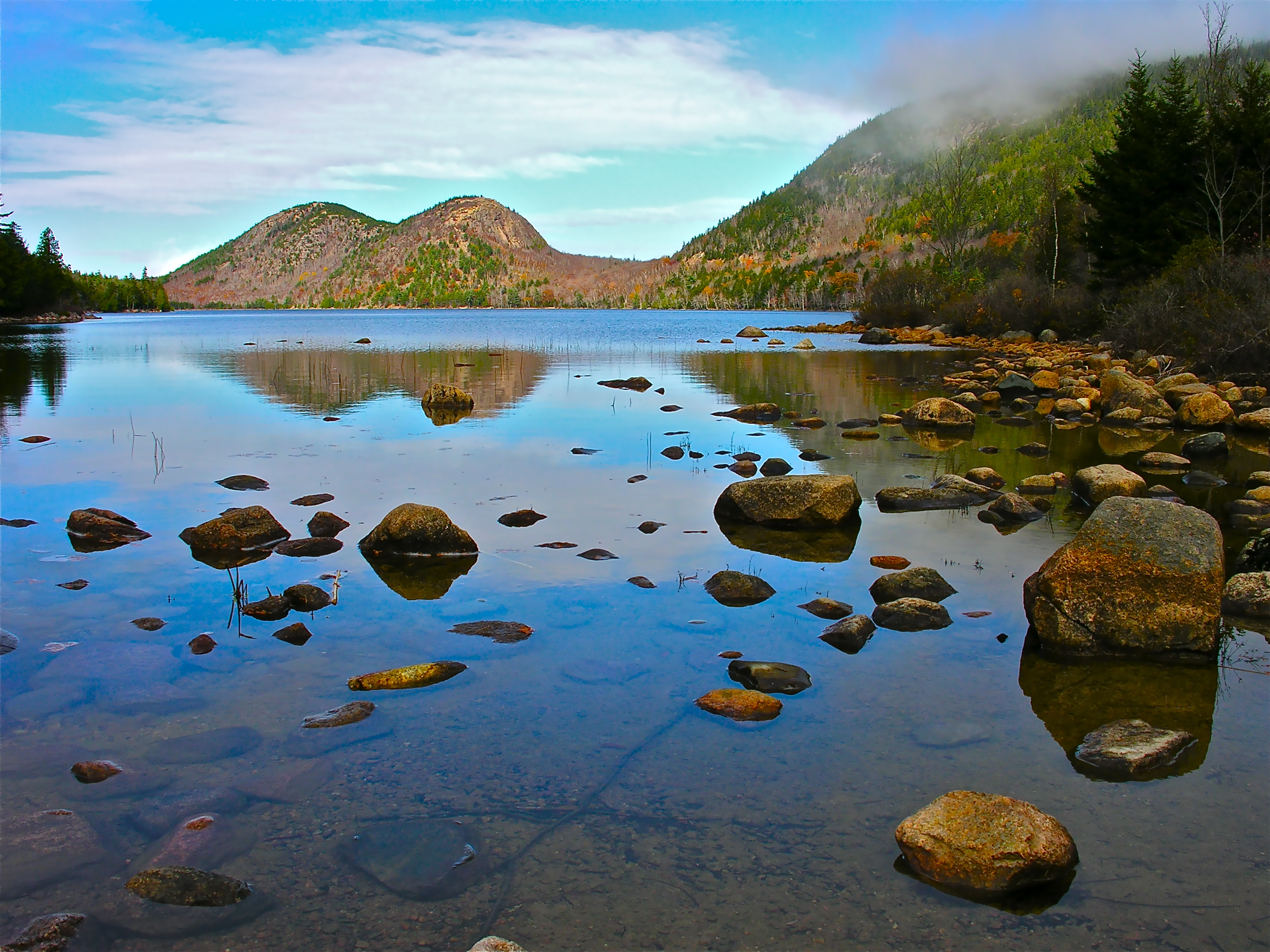
- Jordan Pond and The Bubbles in Acadia

- Location within Maine Location within the United States
- Interactive map of Acadia National Park
- Location: Hancock and Knox counties, Maine, United States
- Nearest city: Bar Harbor
- Coordinates: 44°21′N 68°13′W
- Area: 49,075 acres (198.60 km^{2}); 861.46 acres (348.62 ha; 3.4862 km^{2}) private (in 2017)
- Established: July 8, 1916 (as Sieur de Monts National Monument); February 26, 1919 (as Lafayette National Park); January 19, 1929 (as Acadia National Park)
- Visitors: 4,079,318 (in 2025)
- Governing body: National Park Service
- Website: nps.gov/acad

Central coast of Maine
National park areas are shaded green

Acadia National Park is a national park of the United States located along the mid-section of the Maine coast, southwest of Bar Harbor. The park includes about half of Mount Desert Island, part of Isle au Haut, the tip of the Schoodic Peninsula, and portions of sixteen smaller outlying islands.

The park contains the tallest mountain on the Atlantic Coast of the United States (Cadillac Mountain), exposed granite domes, glacial erratics, U-shaped valleys, and cobble beaches. Its mountains, lakes, streams, wetlands, forests, meadows, and coastlines contribute to a diversity of plants and animals. Woven into this landscape is a historic carriage road system financed by John D. Rockefeller Jr. In total, it encompasses 49,075 acres (19,860 ha; 76.680 sq mi; 198.60 km^{2}) as of 2017.

Acadia has a rich human history, dating back more than 10,000 years ago with the Wabanaki people. The 17th century brought fur traders and other European explorers, while the 19th century saw an influx of summer visitors, then wealthy families. Many conservation-minded citizens, among them George B. Dorr (the "Father of Acadia National Park"), worked to establish this first U.S. national park east of the Mississippi River and the only one in the Northeastern United States. Acadia was initially designated Sieur de Monts National Monument by proclamation of President Woodrow Wilson in 1916, then renamed and redesignated Lafayette National Park in 1919. The park was renamed Acadia National Park in 1929.

Recreational activities from spring through autumn include car and bus touring along the Park Loop Road; hiking, bicycling, and horseback riding on carriage roads (motor vehicles are prohibited); fishing; rock climbing; kayaking and canoeing on lakes and ponds; swimming at Sand Beach and Echo Lake; sea kayaking and guided boat tours on the ocean; and various ranger-led programs. Winter activities include cross-country skiing, snowshoeing, snowmobiling, and ice fishing. Two campgrounds are located on Mount Desert Island, another campground is on the Schoodic Peninsula, and five lean-to sites are on Isle au Haut. The main visitor center is at Hulls Cove, northwest of Bar Harbor. Park visitation reached an all-time high of 4,079,318 recreation visits in 2025, surpassing the previous record of about 4.07 million set in 2021.

== Geography ==
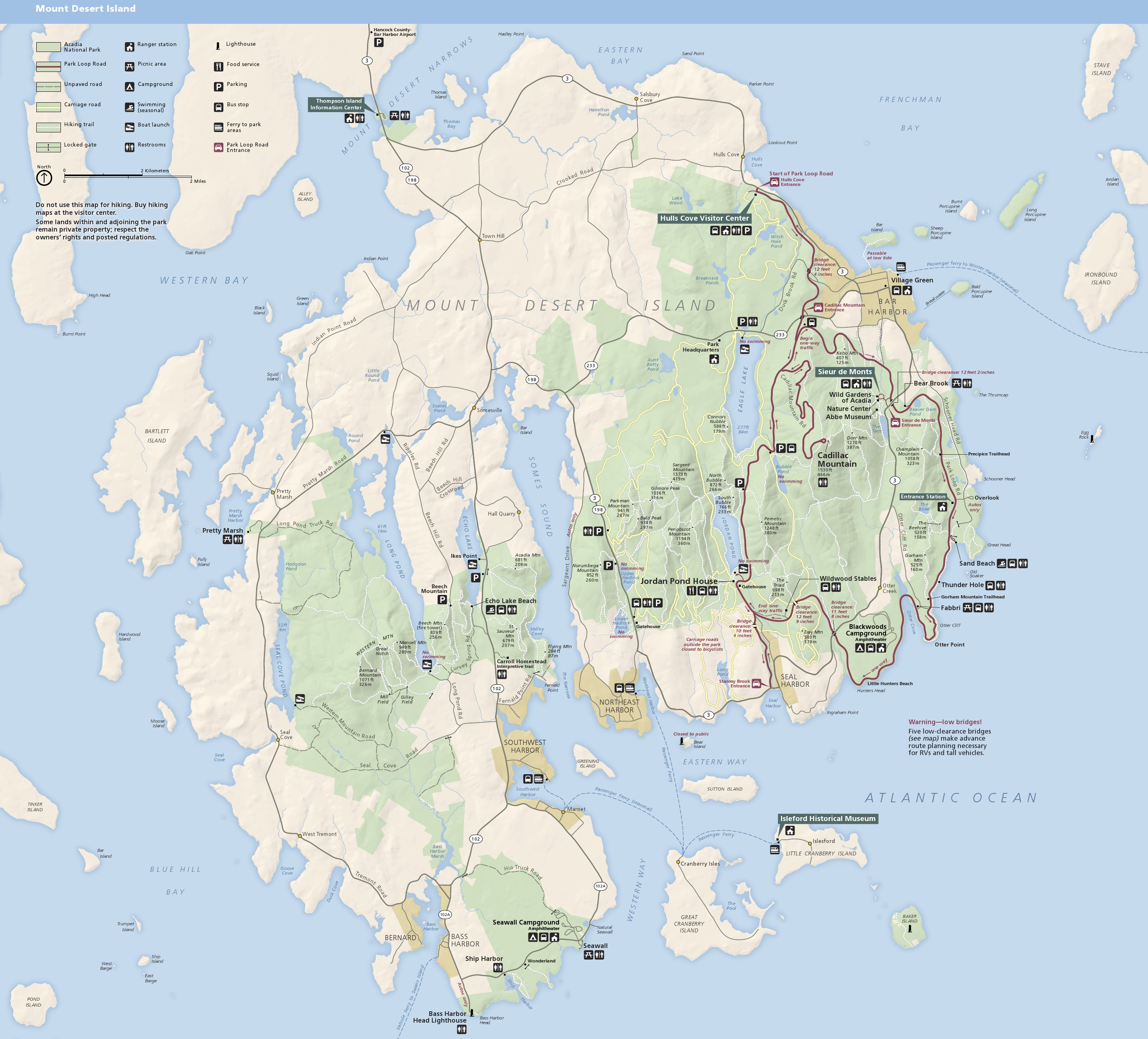
Mount Desert Island map (click map to enlarge)

The park includes mountains, an ocean coastline, woodlands, lakes, and ponds. In addition to nearly half of Mount Desert Island, the park designation also preserves a portion of the Schoodic Peninsula on the mainland, as well as the majority of Isle au Haut and Baker Island, all of Bar Island, three of the four Porcupine Islands (Sheep, Bald and Long), the Thrumcap (an islet), part of Bear Island, and Thompson Island in Mount Desert Narrows, as well as several other islands and islets. Bar Island, which can be visited on foot over a sandbar around low tide, and the Porcupine Islands are in Frenchman Bay by Bar Harbor. About 57 mi (92 km) of carriage roads were designed and financed by John D. Rockefeller Jr. on Mount Desert Island, 45 miles (72 km) of which continue to be maintained inside the park.

Acadia National Park encompasses a total of 49,075 acres (19,860 ha; 76.680 sq mi; 198.60 km^{2}) as of December 31, 2017. At least 30,200 acres (12,200 ha; 47.2 sq mi; 122 km^{2}) on Mount Desert Island are included in the park, along with 2,900 acres (1,200 ha; 4.5 sq mi; 12 km^{2}) on Isle au Haut, about 200 acres (81 ha; 0.31 sq mi; 0.81 km^{2}) on smaller islands, and 2,366 acres (957 ha; 3.697 sq mi; 9.57 km^{2}) on the Schoodic Peninsula. (Note: Total acreage figure as of 2017; Mount Desert Island, Schoodic Peninsula, and smaller islands acreage figures as of 2006; Isle au Haut acreage figure as of 2015; acreage figures may have increased in subsequent years as private land is acquired by the National Park Service.) As of 2015, the permanent park boundary, as established by act of Congress in 1986, included 12,416 acres (5,025 ha; 19.400 sq mi; 50.25 km^{2}) of privately owned land under conservation easements managed by the National Park Service, which plans to acquire the land at some point.

=== Features ===
The mountains of Acadia National Park overlook the Atlantic Ocean, island lakes, and pine forests. More than twenty named mountains rise in the park, ranging from 284 ft (87 m) at Flying Mountain's summit to 1,530 ft (470 m) at Cadillac Mountain's summit. Cadillac Mountain, named after the French explorer Antoine de la Mothe Cadillac, is on the eastern side of the island. Cadillac is the tallest mountain along the eastern coastline of the United States. The summit of Cadillac is the first place in the United States where one may watch the sunrise from October 7 through March 6, due to its eastern location and height.

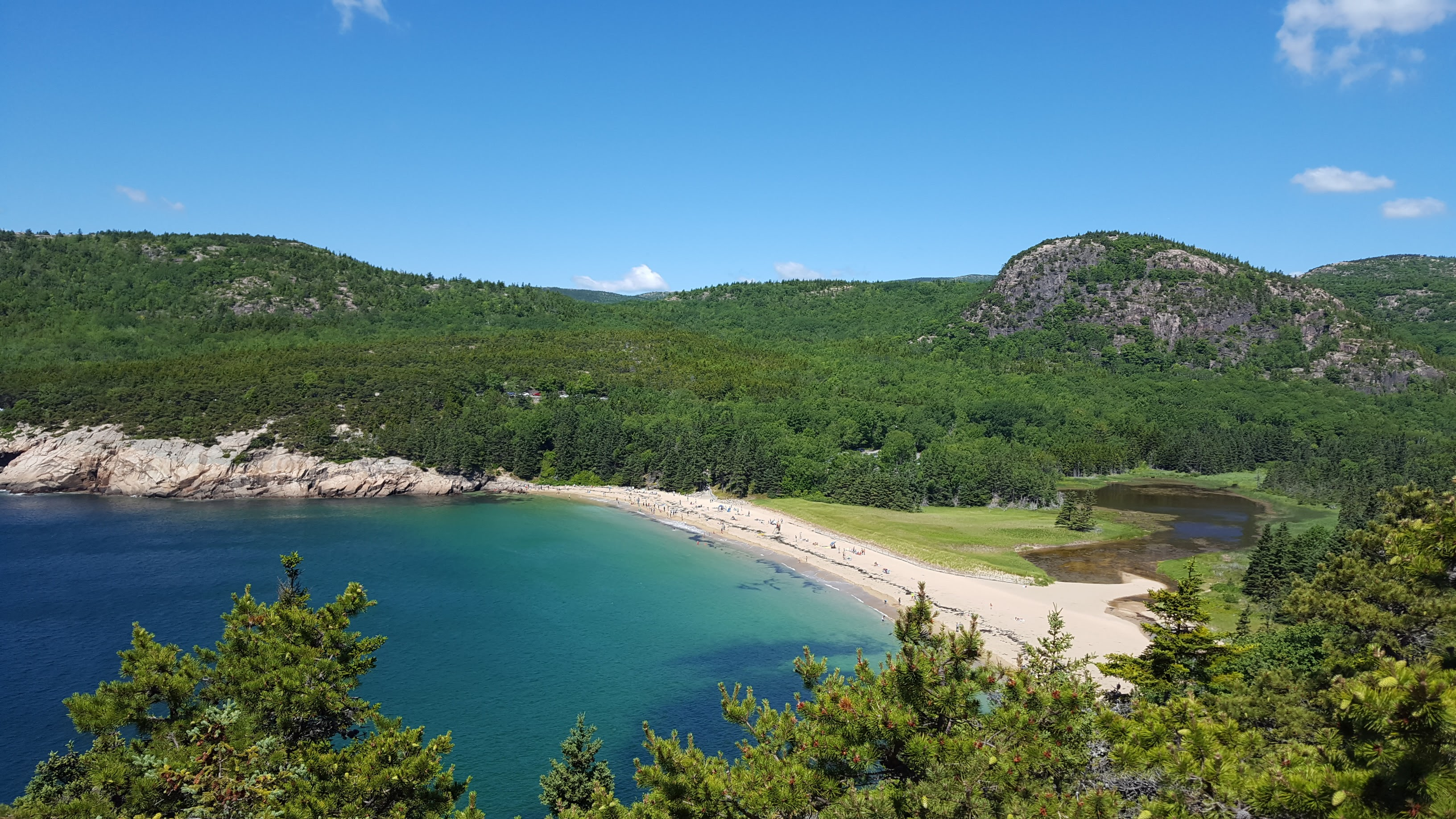
Sand Beach and the Beehive (mountain to the right)

The 27-mile (43 km) Park Loop Road leads to many scenic viewpoints along the coast, through forests and to the top of Cadillac Mountain. The road traverses the eastern side of Mount Desert Island in a one-way, clockwise direction from Bar Harbor to Seal Harbor, passing features such as the Tarn (a pond), Champlain Mountain (location of a popular, exposed cliffside trail named Precipice), the Beehive (another, smaller mountain), Sand Beach (a saltwater swimming area), Gorham Mountain, Thunder Hole (a crevasse into which waves crash loudly), Otter Cliff, Otter Cove, Seal Harbor, Jordan Pond, Pemetic Mountain, the Bubbles, Bubble Rock, Bubble Pond, Eagle Lake, and the side road to the summit of Cadillac Mountain. Some of the island's west side features include Echo Lake and beach (a designated freshwater swimming area), Acadia Mountain, Beech Mountain, Long Pond, and Seal Cove Pond. Bass Harbor Head Light is situated atop a cliff on the southernmost tip of the west side of the island. Baker Island Light and Bear Island Light are the other two lighthouses managed by Acadia.

Somes Sound is a five-mile (8 km) long fjard formed during a glacial period that nearly divides the island in half. The sound is 130 ft (40 m) deep at its deepest point, and is bordered by Norumbega Mountain to the east, and Acadia Mountain and Saint Sauveur Mountain to the west. The towns of Southwest Harbor and Northeast Harbor face one another across the inlet to Somes Sound.

== History ==
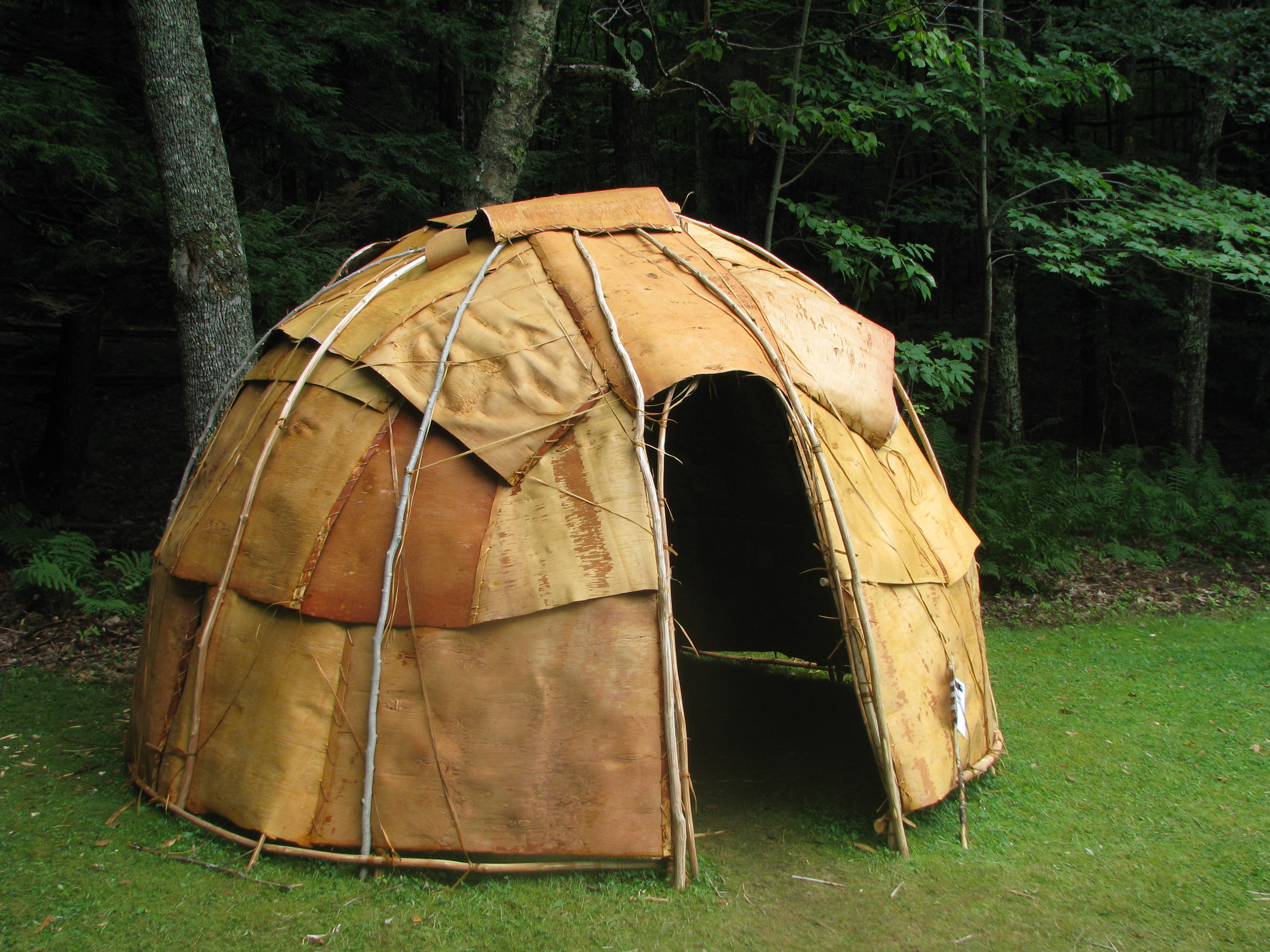
Replica of a Penobscot birch bark wigwam

=== Native people ===
Native Americans have inhabited the area called Acadia for at least 12,000 years, including the coastal areas of Maine, Canada, and adjacent islands. The Wabanaki Confederacy ("People of the Dawnland") consists of five related Algonquian nations—the Maliseet, Mi'kmaq, Passamaquoddy, Abenaki and Penobscot. Some of the nations call Mount Desert Island Pemetic ("range of mountains"), which has remained at the center of the Wabanaki traditional ancestral homeland and territory of traditional stewardship responsibility to the present day. The etymology of the park's name begins with the Mi'kmaq term akadie ("piece of land") which was rendered as l'Acadie by French explorers, and translated into English as Acadia.

The Wabanaki traveled to the island in birch bark canoes to hunt, fish, gather berries, harvest clams and basket-making resources like sweetgrass, and to trade with other Wabanakis. They camped near places like Somes Sound.

In the early 17th century, Asticou was the chieftain of the greater Mount Desert Island area, one district of an intertribal confederacy known as Mawooshen led by the grandchief Bashaba. Castine (Pentagoet in the native language) was the grandchief's favored rendezvous site for the Wabanaki tribes. The site is located just west of Mount Desert Island at the mouth of the Bagaduce River in eastern Penobscot Bay. From 1615, Castine developed into a major fur trading post where French, English, and Dutch traders all fought for control. Sealskins, moose hides, and furs were traded by the Wabanakis for European commodities. By the early 1620s, warfare and introduced diseases, including smallpox, cholera and influenza, had decimated the tribes from Mount Desert Island southward to Cape Cod, leaving about 10 percent of the original population.

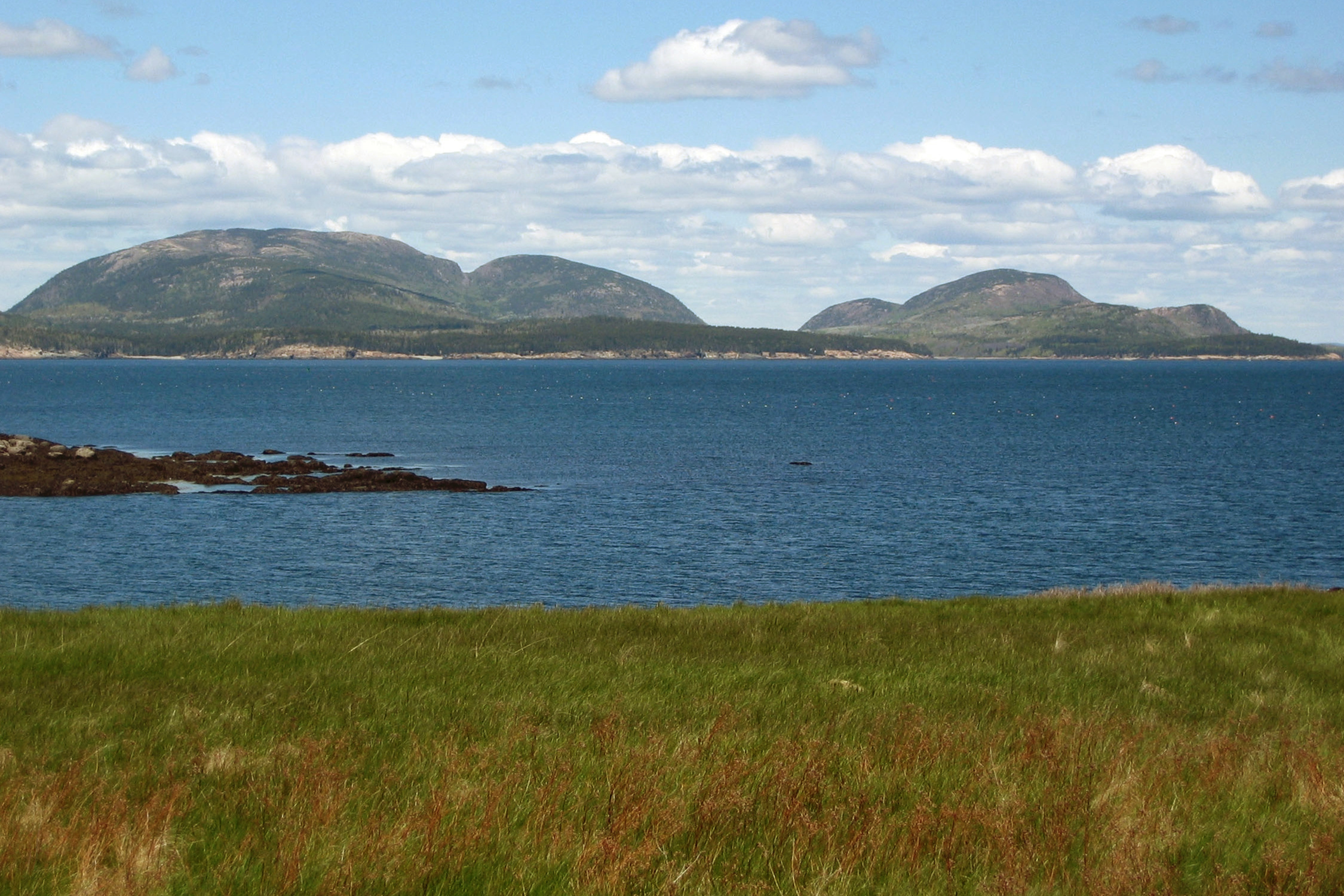
Mount Desert Island from Baker Island

The border established between the United States and Canada after the American Revolution split the Wabanaki homelands. The confederacy was dissolved around 1870 due to pressure from the American and Canadian governments, though the tribal nations continued to interact in their traditional ways. In the nineteenth century, Wabanakis sold handmade ash and birch bark baskets to travelers. The Wabanaki performed dances for summer tourists and residents at Sieur de Monts and the town of Bar Harbor. Wabanaki guides led canoe trips around Frenchman Bay and the Cranberry Islands.

For two years, 1970–71, the nations operated a Wabanaki educational center called T.R.I.B.E. (Teaching and Research in Bicultural Education) on the west side of Eagle Lake. American Indian land claims in Maine were legally settled in 1980 and 1991. The annual Bar Harbor Native American Festival began in 1989, jointly sponsored by the tribes and the Abbe Museum. The Maine Indian Basketmakers Alliance was formed in 1993, assisting in the coordination of the annual festival with the museum.

Currently, each tribe has a reservation and government headquarters located within their territories throughout Maine. Some Wabanakis live on Mount Desert Island, while others visit for board meetings at the Abbe Museum, to advise on and perform in exhibitions, for craft demonstrations, and to gather sweetgrass and sell handmade baskets at the annual festival.

=== Exploration ===
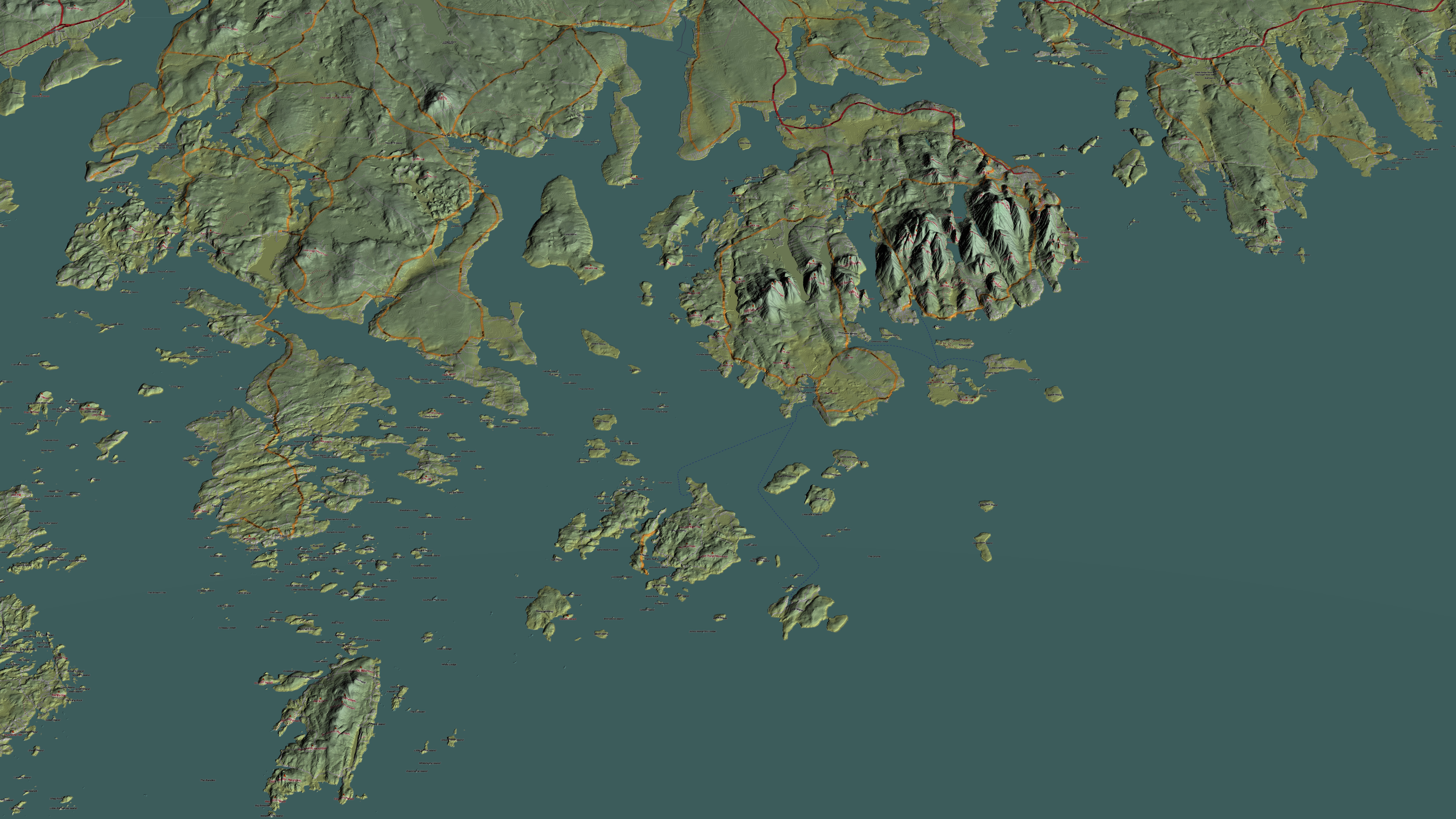
Aerial view, 3D computer-generated image

The Italian explorer Giovanni da Verrazzano sailed along the coast of Mount Desert Island during an expedition for the French Crown in 1524. He was followed by Estêvão Gomes, a Portuguese explorer for the Spanish Crown in 1525. French explorer Jean Alfonse arrived in 1542. Alfonse entered Penobscot Bay and recorded details about the fur trade. Portuguese navigator Simon Ferdinando guided an English expedition in 1580.

A few hundred people were living on Mount Desert Island when Samuel de Champlain arrived in 1604. Two Wabanakis led Champlain to Mount Desert Island, which he named Isle des Monts Deserts (Island of Barren Mountains) due to its barren peaks; he named Isle au Haut (High Island) due to its height.

While he was sailing down the coast on 5 September 1604, Champlain wrote:

That same day we also passed near an island about four or five leagues [12–15 mi; 19–24 km] in length, off which we were almost lost on a little rock, level with the surface of the water, which made a hole in our pinnace close to the keel. The distance from this island to the mainland on the north is not a hundred paces. It is very high and cleft in places, giving it the appearance from the sea of seven or eight mountains one alongside the other. The tops of them are bare of trees, because there is nothing there but rocks. The woods consist only of pines, firs, and birches.

=== Settlement ===
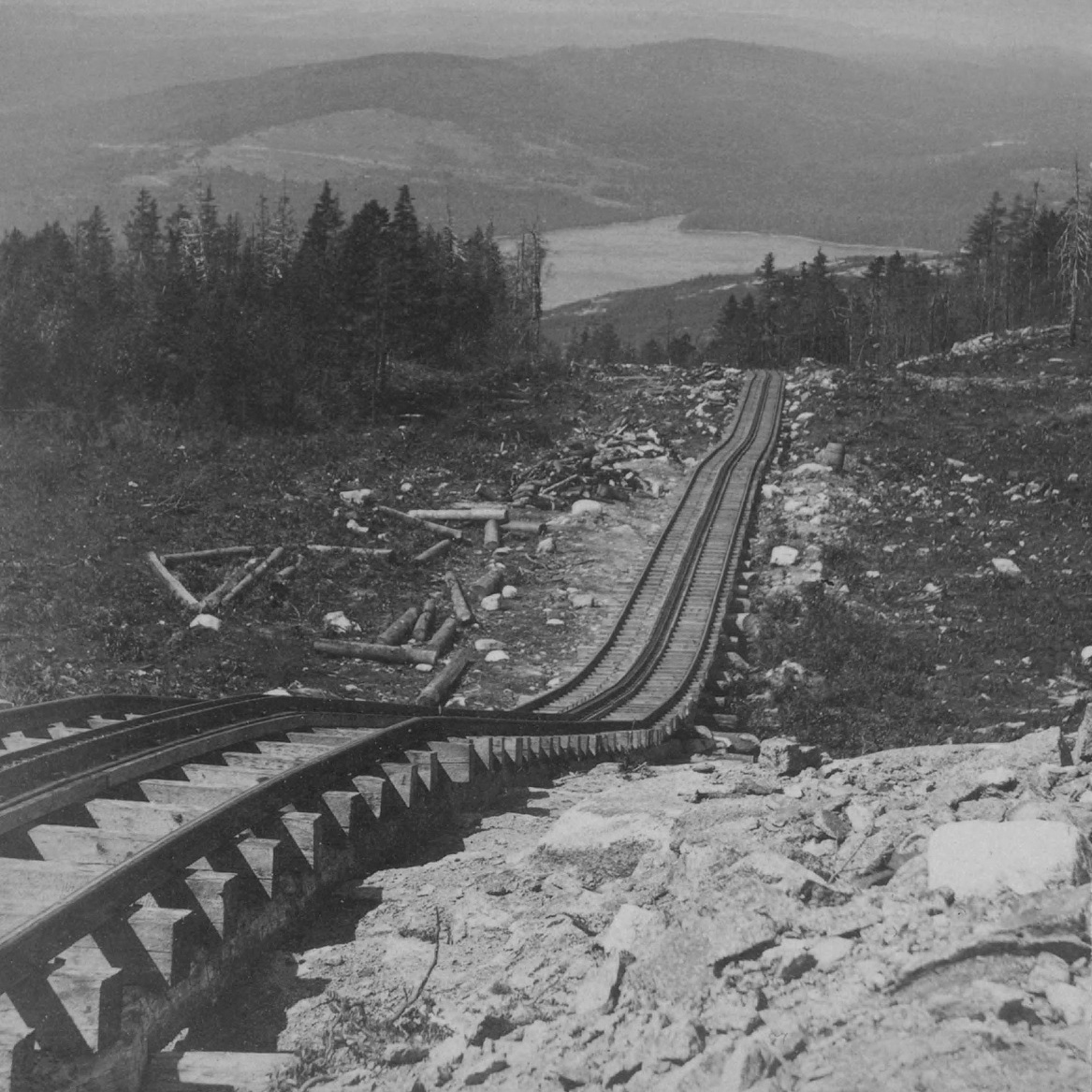
The Green Mountain Cog Railway ran from Eagle Lake to Cadillac Mountain's summit from 1888 to 1890.

The first French missionary colony in America was established on Mount Desert Island in 1613. The colony was destroyed a short time later by an armed vessel from the Colony of Virginia as the first act of overt warfare in the long struggle leading to the French and Indian Wars. The island was granted to Antoine de la Mothe Cadillac by King Louis XIV in 1688, but ceded to Great Britain in 1713 as part of the Peace of Utrecht. Massachusetts governor Sir Francis Bernard, 1st Baronet, assumed control of the island in 1760. In 1790, Massachusetts granted the eastern half of the island to Cadillac's granddaughter, Mme. de Gregoire, while Bernard's son John retained ownership of the western half. The first record of summer visitors vacationing on the island was in 1855, and steamboat service from Boston was inaugurated in 1868. The Green Mountain Cog Railway was built from the shore of Eagle Lake to the summit of Cadillac Mountain in 1888. In 1901, the Maine Legislature granted Hancock County a charter to acquire and hold land on the island in the public interest. The first land was donated by Mrs. Eliza Homans of Boston in 1908, and 5,000 acres (2,000 ha; 7.8 sq mi; 20 km^{2}) had been acquired by 1914.

=== Rusticators ===
Artists and journalists had revealed and popularized the island in the mid-1800s. Painters came from the Hudson River School, including Thomas Cole and Frederic Church, inspiring patrons and friends to visit. The term rusticator was used to describe these early visitors who stayed in the homes of local fishermen and farmers for modest fees. In 1867, Clara Barnes Martin published the popular guidebook, Mount Desert on the Coast of Maine. The accommodations soon became insufficient for the increasing amount of summer visitors, and by 1880, thirty hotels were operating on the island. Tourism was becoming the major industry.

=== Cottagers ===
For a select few Americans, the 1880s and the Gay Nineties meant affluence on a scale without precedent. Mount Desert Island, being remote from the cities of the east, became a summer retreat for families such as the Rockefellers, Morgans, Fords, Vanderbilts, Carnegies, and Astors. These families, with the help of developers such as Charles T. How, constructed elegant estates, which they called cottages. Luxury, refinement, and large gatherings replaced the buckboard rides, picnics, and day-long hikes of the rusticators. For more than forty years, the wealthy dominated summer activity on Mount Desert Island, but the Great Depression and World War II brought an end to the extravagance.

=== Park origins ===
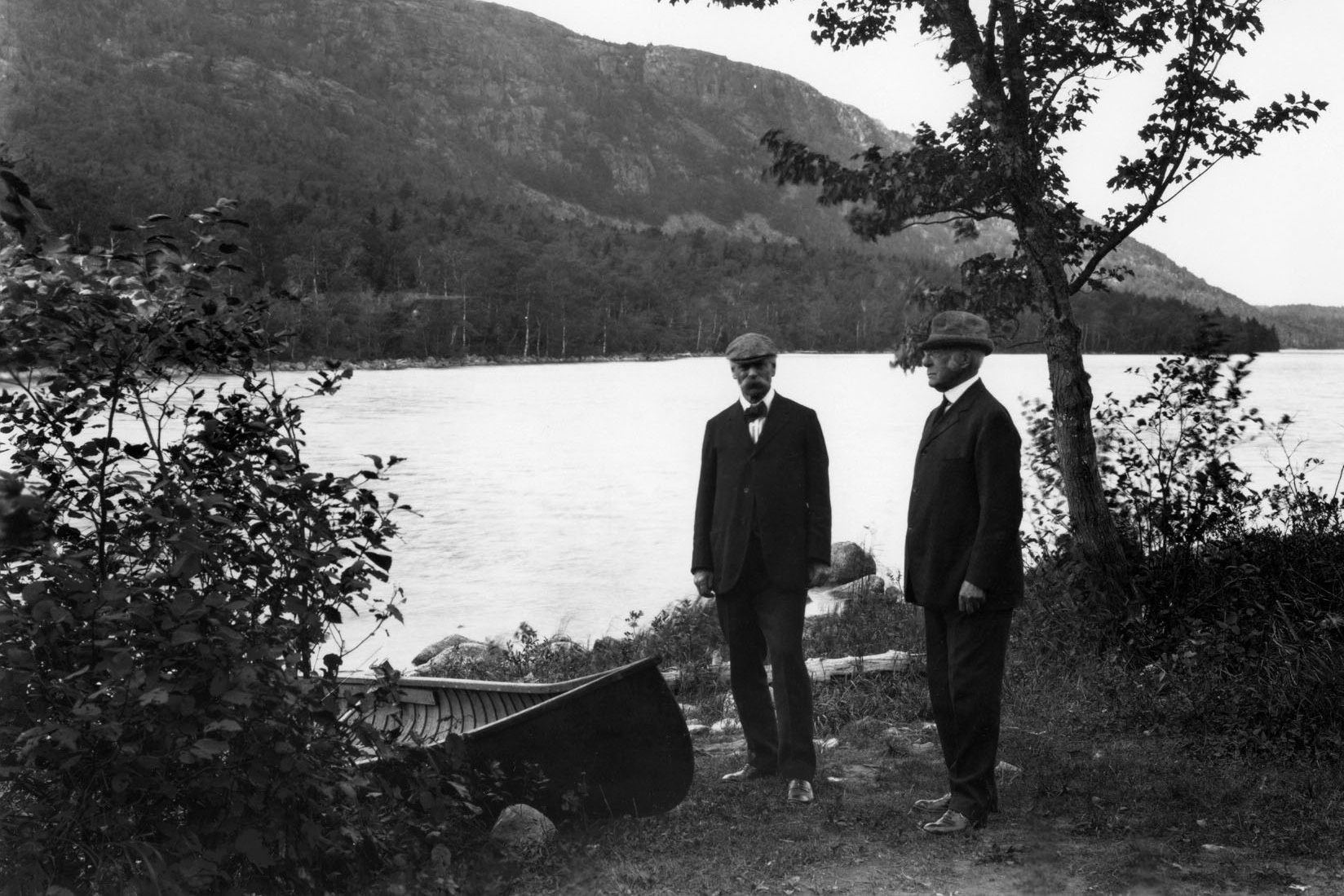
George B. Dorr and Charles W. Eliot on the shore of Jordan Pond.

The landscape architect Charles Eliot is credited with the idea for the park. George B. Dorr, called the "Father of Acadia National Park", along with Eliot's father Charles W. Eliot (president of Harvard from 1869 to 1909), supported the idea both through donations of land and through advocacy at the state and federal levels. Dorr later served as the park's first superintendent. President Woodrow Wilson first established its federal status as Sieur de Monts National Monument on July 8, 1916, administered by the National Park Service. It was the first national park created from private lands gifted to the public.

We have entered on an important work; we have succeeded until the Nation itself has taken cognizance of it and joined with us for its advancement...No one who had not made the study of it which I have can realize how various and truly wonderful the opportunities are which the creation of this Park now opens, alike in wild life ways and splendid scenery. To lose by want of action now what will be so precious to the future, whether for the delight of men or as a means to study, would be no less than tragic.

— George B. Dorr, 1916, Acadia National Park: Its Origin and Background (1942), pp. 53 and 55

Congress redesignated the national monument as Lafayette National Park on February 26, 1919, the first American national park east of the Mississippi River and the only one in the Northeastern United States. The park was named after the Marquis de Lafayette, an influential French participant in the American Revolution. Jordan Pond Road was started in 1922 and completed as a scenic motor highway in 1927. The Cadillac Mountain Summit Road, begun in 1925, was completed in 1931.

The name of the park was changed to Acadia National Park on January 19, 1929, in honor of the former French colony of Acadia, which once included Maine. In 1929 Schoodic Peninsula was donated to Acadia by John Godfrey Moore's second wife Louise and daughters Ruth and Faith. Keeping up with the taxes on the Schoodic land became a drain on the family finances and they thought this would be a fitting way to honor John Godfrey Moore. There was an unspoken stipulation in the discussions — the heirs were anglophiles that did not want to have their land as part of Lafayette National Park. Conservationist George Dorr suggested the name Acadia, and the deal went through after the name changed, ensuring the expansion.

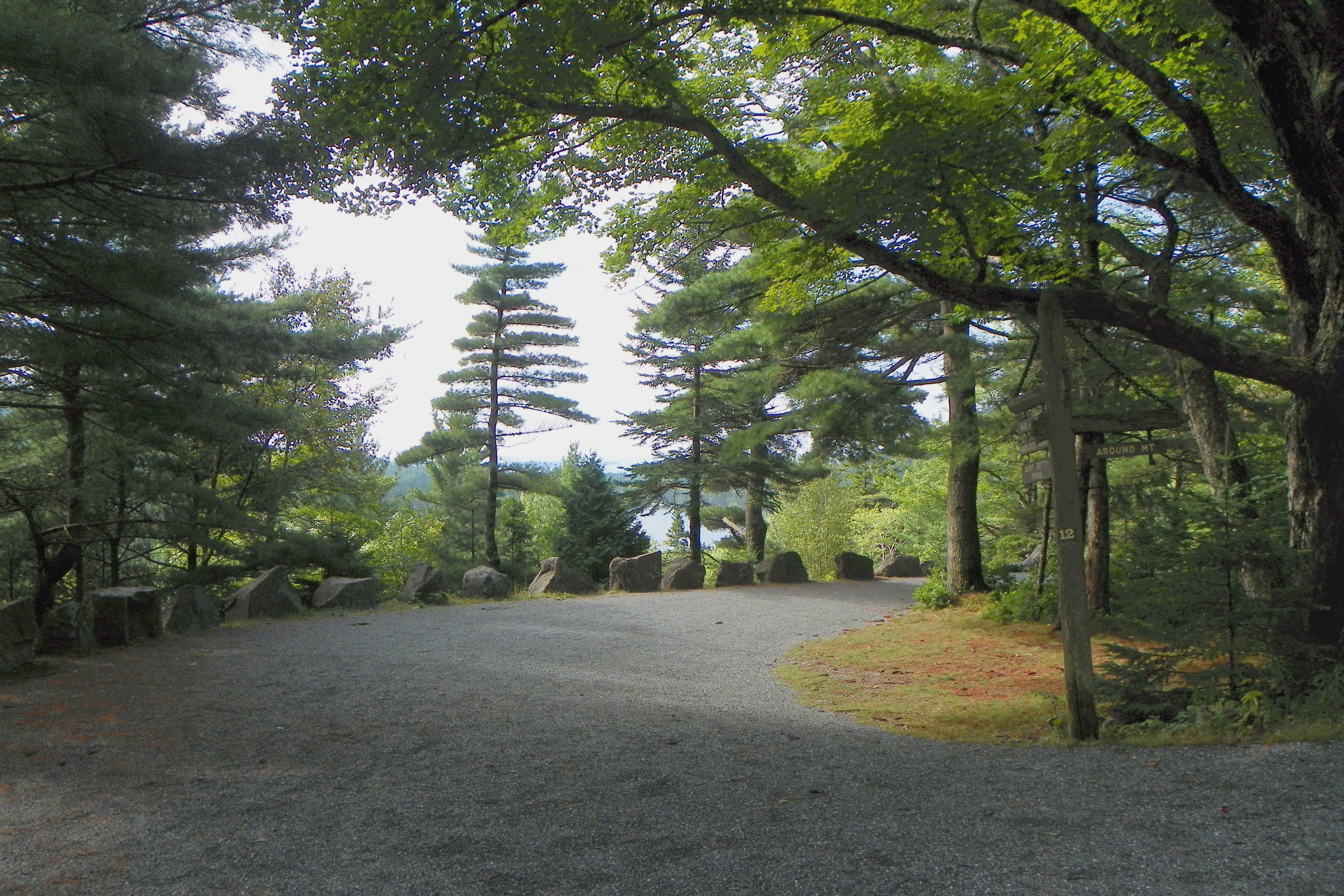
Carriage road with "Rockefeller's Teeth" (granite coping stones).

From 1915 to 1940, the wealthy philanthropist John D. Rockefeller Jr. financed, designed, and directed the construction of a network of carriage roads throughout the park. He sponsored the landscape architect Beatrix Farrand, whose family owned a summer home in Bar Harbor named Reef Point Estate, to design the planting plans for the carriage roads (c. 1930). The network originally encompassed about 57 miles (92 km) of crushed stone carriage roads with 17 stone-faced, steel-reinforced concrete bridges (16 financed by Rockefeller), and two gate lodges—one at Jordan Pond and the other near Northeast Harbor. About 45 miles (72 km) of carriage roads are maintained and accessible within park boundaries. Granite coping stones along carriage road edges act as guard rails; they are nicknamed "Rockefeller's Teeth". The carriage roads are open from the end of the spring mud season, generally in late April, through the summer, autumn, and winter months, until the following spring thaw causes another closure in March to prevent damage to the gravel surface.

Acadia National Park's first naturalist, Arthur Stupka, also had the distinction of being the first NPS naturalist to serve in any of the NPS's eastern United States districts. He joined the park staff in 1932, and in the capacity of park naturalist he wrote, edited and published a four-volume serial entitled Nature Notes from Acadia (1932–1935).

=== Administrative history ===
==== Superintendents ====
Superintendent	Start	End
George B. Dorr	February 26, 1919	May 8, 1944
Benjamin L. Hadley (acting)	July 8, 1944	November 20, 1944
Benjamin L. Hadley	November 20, 1944	March 31, 1953
Charles R. Scarborough (acting)	July 15, 1952	November 4, 1953
Frank R. Givens	December 4, 1953	October 17, 1959
Harold A. Hubler	October 18, 1959	December 30, 1965
Thomas B. Hyde	January 30, 1966	May 4, 1968
John M. Good	April 21, 1968	August 8, 1971
Keith E. Miller	August 22, 1971	September 9, 1978
Lowell White	October 9, 1978	November 15, 1980
Warner Forsell (acting)	November 16, 1980	May 30, 1981
Ronald N. Wrye	May 31, 1981	July 19, 1986
Robert Joseph Abrell (acting)	July 20, 1986	January 31, 1987
John A. Hauptman	January 2, 1987	March 23, 1991
Leonard V. Bobinchock (acting)	March 24, 1991	April 5, 1991
Robert W. Reynolds	May 5, 1991	1994
Leonard V. Bobinchock (acting)	1994	1994
Paul Haertel	1994	2002
Leonard V. Bobinchock (acting)	2002	2003
Sheridan Steele	2003	2015
Kevin Schneider	2015	

=== Fire of 1947 ===
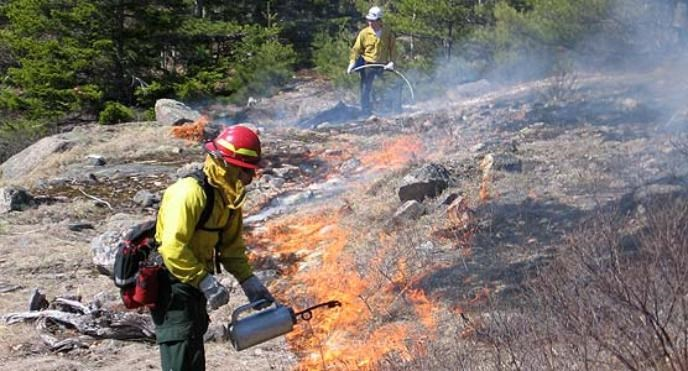
Firefighters at a prescribed burn, keeping vistas clear and reducing wildfire risk

Beginning on October 17, 1947, more than 10,000 acres (4,000 ha; 16 sq mi; 40 km^{2}) of Acadia National Park burned in a fire that also destroyed an additional 7,000 acres (2,800 ha; 11 sq mi; 28 km^{2}) of Mount Desert Island outside the park. The fire began along Crooked Road west of Hulls Cove (northwest of Bar Harbor). The forest fire was one of a series of fires that consumed much of Maine's forest in a dry year. The fire burned until November 14, and was fought by the Coast Guard, Army Air Corps, Navy, local residents, and National Park Service employees from around the country. Sixty-seven of the historic summer cottages along Millionaires' Row, along with 170 other homes, and five hotels were destroyed. Restoration of the park was substantially supported by the Rockefeller family. Regrowth has occurred naturally with new deciduous forests consisting of birch and aspen enhancing the colors of autumn foliage, adding diversity to tree populations, and providing for the eventual regeneration of spruce and fir forests.

== Climate ==
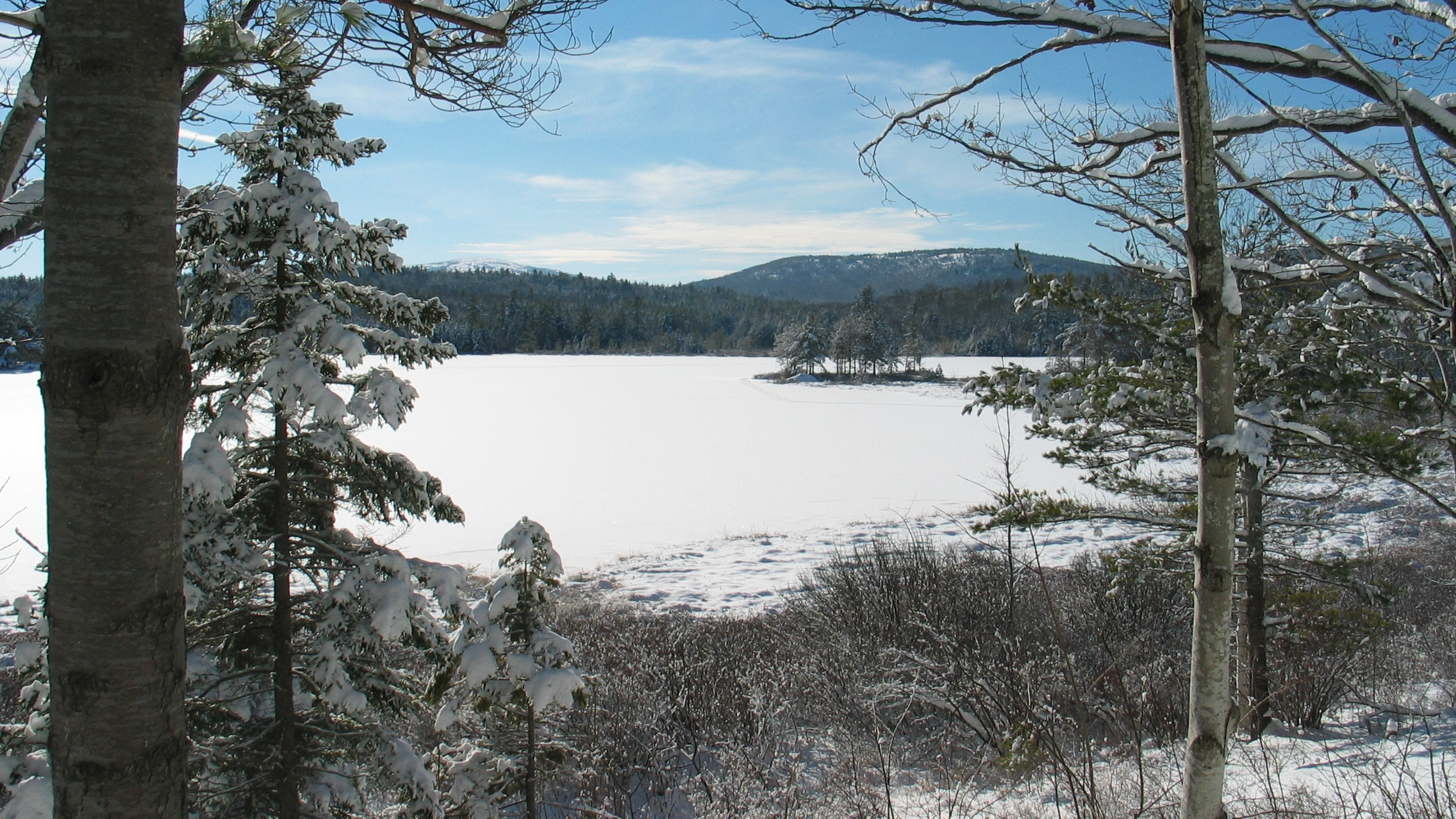
Frozen lake and snowy trees

The region is characterized by a large seasonal variation in temperature with warm to hot summers that are often humid, and cold to severely cold winters. According to the Köppen climate classification system, Mount Desert Island has a warm-summer humid continental climate (Dfb). The average annual temperature in the park is 47.3 °F (8.5 °C). July is the warmest month with an average of 69.7 °F (20.9 °C), while January is the coldest month with an average of 23.8 °F (−4.6 °C). The record high and low temperatures are 96 °F (36 °C) and −21 °F (−29 °C), respectively. The plant hardiness zone is 5b with an average annual extreme minimum air temperature of −11.4 °F (−24.1 °C).

Average annual precipitation in Bar Harbor is 55.54" (1411 mm). November is the wettest month with 5.89" (150 mm) of precipitation on average, while July is the driest month with 3.27" (83 mm). Precipitation days are spread evenly throughout the year with December averaging the most days with about 14, while August averages the least with about 9. The annual average days with precipitation is 139. Snow has been recorded from October to May, although the majority falls from December to March. The snowiest month is January with 18.3" (46 cm), and the annual average is 66.1" (167 cm).

Climate data for Acadia National Park, Maine, 1991–2020 normals, extremes 1982–2014
Month	Jan	Feb	Mar	Apr	May	Jun	Jul	Aug	Sep	Oct	Nov	Dec	Year
Record high °F (°C)	57 (14)	61 (16)	82 (28)	85 (29)	96 (36)	95 (35)	96 (36)	94 (34)	95 (35)	83 (28)	71 (22)	63 (17)	96 (36)
Mean daily maximum °F (°C)	32.5 (0.3)	34.9 (1.6)	41.6 (5.3)	53.2 (11.8)	64.5 (18.1)	73.9 (23.3)	79.3 (26.3)	78.3 (25.7)	70.9 (21.6)	58.5 (14.7)	47.8 (8.8)	37.8 (3.2)	56.1 (13.4)
Daily mean °F (°C)	23.8 (−4.6)	26.2 (−3.2)	33.3 (0.7)	44.0 (6.7)	54.7 (12.6)	63.9 (17.7)	69.7 (20.9)	69.0 (20.6)	61.9 (16.6)	50.6 (10.3)	40.3 (4.6)	30.1 (−1.1)	47.3 (8.5)
Mean daily minimum °F (°C)	15.1 (−9.4)	17.5 (−8.1)	25.0 (−3.9)	34.8 (1.6)	44.8 (7.1)	53.8 (12.1)	60.2 (15.7)	59.7 (15.4)	52.8 (11.6)	42.8 (6.0)	32.7 (0.4)	22.4 (−5.3)	38.5 (3.6)
Record low °F (°C)	−21 (−29)	−18 (−28)	−11 (−24)	8 (−13)	24 (−4)	32 (0)	36 (2)	35 (2)	31 (−1)	16 (−9)	3 (−16)	−13 (−25)	−21 (−29)
Average precipitation inches (mm)	4.48 (114)	3.84 (98)	4.94 (125)	5.15 (131)	4.50 (114)	4.28 (109)	3.27 (83)	3.45 (88)	4.22 (107)	5.86 (149)	5.89 (150)	5.66 (144)	55.54 (1,411)
Average snowfall inches (cm)	17.0 (43)	16.8 (43)	15.5 (39)	4.7 (12)	trace	0.0 (0.0)	0.0 (0.0)	0.0 (0.0)	0.0 (0.0)	0.2 (0.51)	3.0 (7.6)	14.6 (37)	71.8 (182.11)
Average precipitation days (≥ 0.01 in)	12.1	9.8	12.2	11.6	13.5	12.1	10.8	9.3	10.7	11.5	11.4	13.7	138.7
Average snowy days (≥ 0.1 in)	6.3	5.3	4.5	1.2	0.0	0.0	0.0	0.0	0.0	0.0	1.2	4.5	23.0
Source 1: NOAA (snow/snow days 1981–2010)
Source 2: XMACIS2

== Geology ==
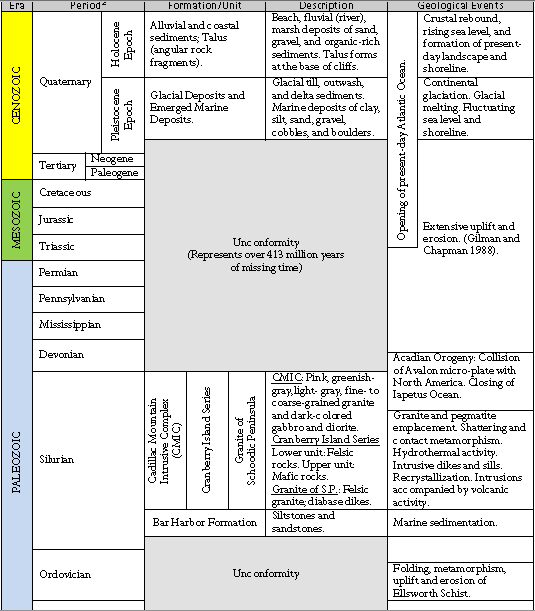
Geologic column for the park region (click image to enlarge)

The Cadillac Mountain Intrusive Complex is part of the Coastal Maine Magmatic Province, consisting of over a hundred mafic and felsic plutons associated with the Acadian Orogeny. Mount Desert Island bedrock consists mainly of Cadillac Mountain granite. Perthite gives the granite its pinkish color. The Silurian age granite ranges from 424 to 419 million years ago (Mya). Diabase dikes trend north–south through the complex. Almost 300 million years of erosion followed before the deposition of glacial features during the Pleistocene. Glacial polish, glacial striations, and chatter marks are evident in granitic surfaces. Other glacier-shaped features include The Bubbles (two rôche moutonnées) and the U-shaped valleys of Sargent Mountain Pond, Jordan Pond, Seal Cove Pond, Long Pond, Echo Lake, and Eagle Lake. Somes Sound is a fjard and terminal moraines form the southern end of Long Pond, Echo Lake, and Jordan Pond. Bubble Rock is an example of a glacial erratic.

=== Bedrock formation ===
More than 500 Mya, layers of mud, sand and volcanic ash were buried beneath the ocean where high pressure, heat and tectonic activity created a metamorphic rock formation called the Ellsworth Schist. White and gray quartz, feldspar, and green chlorite comprise the schist, which is the oldest rock in the Mount Desert Island region. Erosion and shifting of tectonic plates eventually brought the schist to the surface.

About 450 Mya, an ancient continental fragment, or micro-terrane, called Avalonia collided with North America. The collision buried the schist along with accumulations of sand and silt, creating the Bar Harbor Formation which consists of brown and gray sandstone and siltstone layers. Material from volcanic flows and ash were also deposited on the formation, creating the volcanic rock found on the Cranberry Islands. Further volcanic activity introduced igneous rocks into the Bar Harbor Formation. As the igneous intrusions cooled, crystallized minerals formed including a gabbro composed of dark, iron-rich minerals.

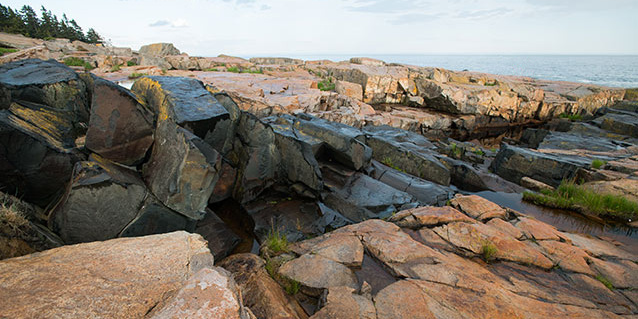
Schoodic Point igneous intrusion

Mount Desert Island granite was created about 420 Mya, with one of the oldest granite bodies being Cadillac Mountain, the largest on the island. The granite body rose slowly through bedrock, fracturing it into large pieces, some of which melted under intense heat. As the granite cooled, the bedrock fragments were left surrounded by crystallized granite in a shatter zone that is visible on the eastern side of the mountain. A fine-grained, black igneous rock called diabase intruded into the granite during later volcanic activity. Diabase bodies, or dikes, are visible along the Cadillac Mountain road and on the Schoodic Peninsula.

During the next several hundred million years, the rock layers that still covered the large granite bodies, along with softer rock surrounding the granite, were worn away by erosion.

=== Glaciation ===
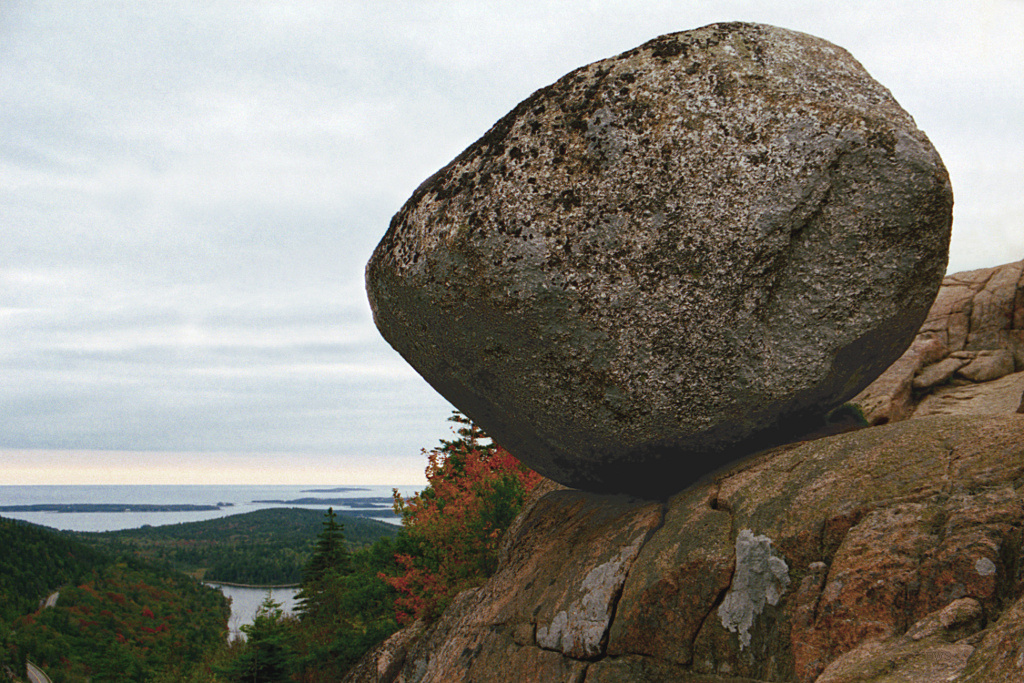
Bubble Rock, a glacial erratic on South Bubble mountain

During the last two to three million years, a series of ice sheets flowed and receded across northern North America, eroding mountains and creating U-shaped valleys. The glacier that covered Mount Desert Range, part of which is now called Mount Desert Island, was one mile (1.6 km) thick and moved at the rate of a few yards (meters) per year. The mountain range was heavily eroded by the glacier which rounded off mountaintops, carved saddles, deepened valleys, and created the fjard known as Somes Sound, nearly dividing the current island in half. Evidence of the last glacial period, the Wisconsin glaciation from about 75,000 to 11,000 years ago, is visible as long scratches, or striations, and crescent-shaped gouges created by material carried along at the base of the ice. As the climate warmed, the glaciers melted and receded, leaving boulders that had been carried 20 mi (32 km) or further south from their original locations. These boulders, or glacial erratics, lie in valleys and on mountaintops, including Bubble Rock on the South Bubble.

The coastal areas of Maine sank slightly under the extreme weight of the ice sheets, allowing seawater to cover lowlands thus forming the present-day islands. Evidence of sea caves and past beaches can be found about 300 ft (91 m) above current sea level. As the ice receded and the land stabilized, lakes and ponds formed in valleys dammed by glacial debris. Rivers and streams flowed again through the watershed, continuing the gradual erosion of the drainage paths.

=== Erosion and weathering ===
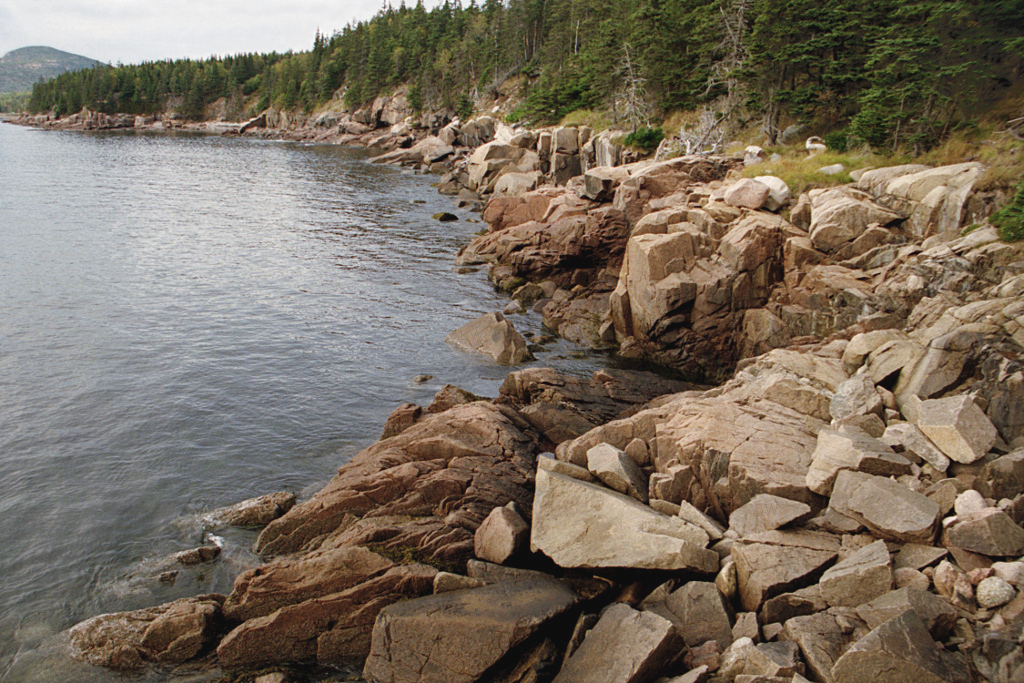
Otter Cove from Otter Point

Acadia has a coastline composed of rocky headlands, and more heavily eroded stony or sandy beaches. Coastal areas directly facing the wind-driven waves of the Atlantic Ocean are solely composed of large boulders as all other material has been washed out to sea. Areas partially protected by rocky headlands contain the remains of more eroded rocks, consisting of pebbles, cobbles and smaller boulders. Sheltered coves, such as at Sand Beach, contain fine-grained particles that are primarily the remains of shells and other hard parts of marine life, including mussels and sea urchins.

Granitic ridges are subjected to frost weathering. Joints, or fractures, are slowly enlarged as trapped water repeatedly freezes and melts, eventually splitting off a block. Bright pink scars with granitic rubble below are evidence of such weathering; one example can be seen above the Tarn, a pond just south of Bar Harbor.

At least twelve sea caves are located in several coastal areas of the park. Sea caves are formed when waves cause erosion of coastal rock formations. If a sea cave is enlarged enough, it may break through a headland to form a sea arch.

=== Mass wasting and slope failure ===
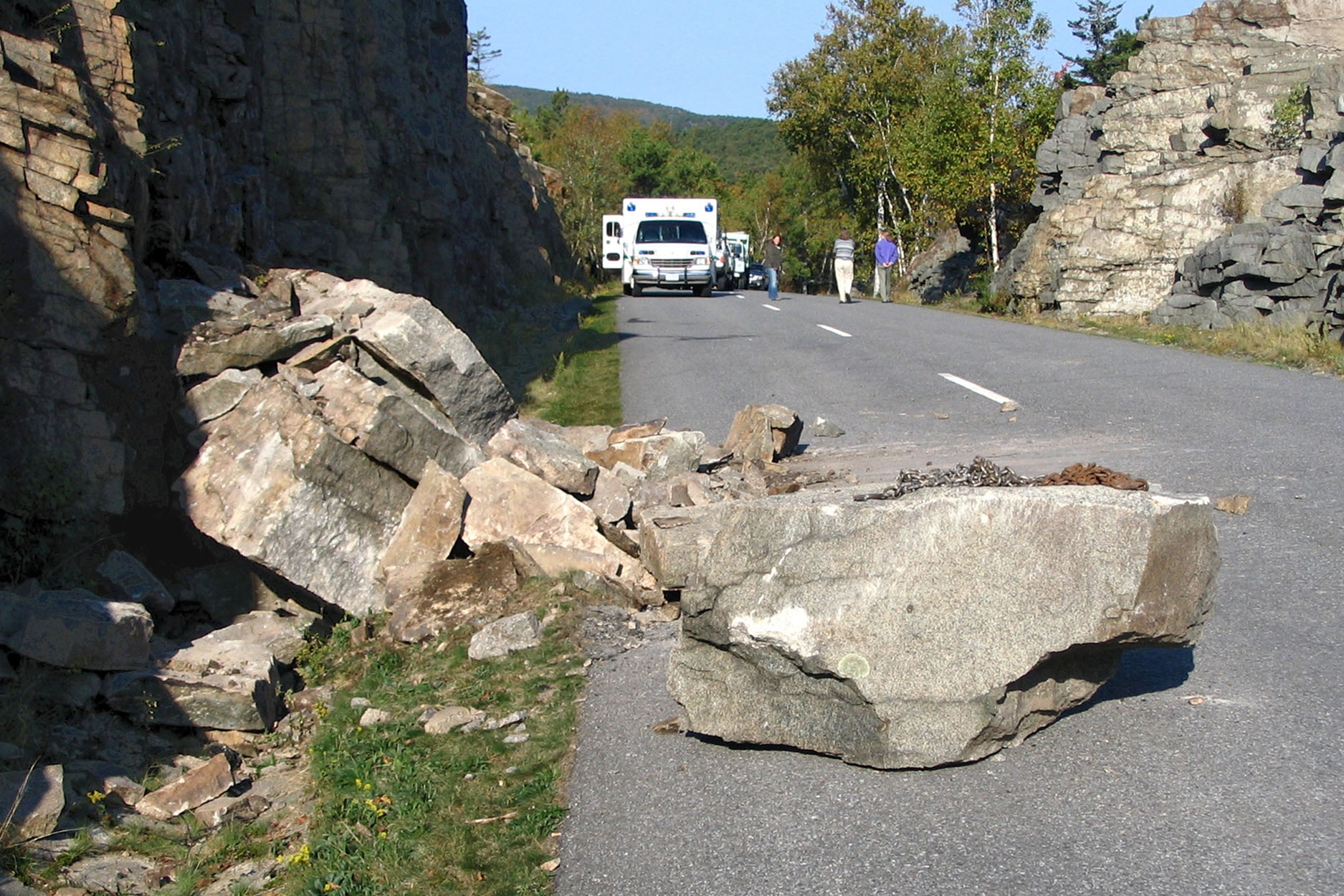
Rockfall along the loop road

Frequent thawing in winter prevents large accumulations of snow, and keeps the ground well saturated. Ice storms are common in winter and early spring, while rain occurs throughout the year. Saturated soils, thawing, and heavy precipitation lead to rockfalls every spring along Mount Desert Island's loop road, as well as slumping along coastal bluffs.

Mass wasting (slope movement) of marine clay, deposited when the sea level was much higher, occurs along Hunters Brook on Mount Desert Island. Slumping of the greenish-gray clay destabilized the bank, changing the course of the stream. The eastern end of Otter Cove's beach contains eroded gullies of marine clay. Mass wasting and slope failure may occur wherever marine clay is exposed.

=== Seismic activity ===
Earthquakes with epicenters near the park have caused landslides, damaging roads and trails. Earthquakes in Maine occur at a low but steady rate, with magnitudes usually less than 4.8 on the Richter scale.

== Paleontology ==
The Presumpscot Formation has yielded a diverse collection of mostly marine fossils. The formation is composed of silt and clay deposited between 15 and 11,000 years ago when isostatic loading raised sea level as land was submerged to about 330–395 ft (101–120 m) above the current level. Post-glacial rebound lowered sea level, exposing the seabed to a depth of about 195 ft (59 m) below the current level. A global rise in sea-level flooded the shelf to the current level.

Plant fossils include pollen, spores, logs, and other plant macrofossils. Invertebrate fossils include foraminifera (protists that form test shells), sponge spicules, bryozoans, bivalves, gastropods, Spirorbis, beetles, ants, barnacles, decapod crustaceans (crabs, shrimp, lobsters, etc.), ostracodes (seed shrimp), and ophiuroids (brittle stars). Vertebrate fossils include fish and a few rare large mammals, such as walruses, whales, and a mammoth. Walrus remains have been reported on Andrews Island, 19 mi (31 km) west of Isle au Haut; Addison Point, 23 mi (37 km) northeast of the Schoodic Peninsula; and Gardiner, 57 mi (92 km) west-northwest of Isle au Haut. The mammoth bones were found at Scarborough, 87 mi (140 km) southwest of Isle au Haut.

== Ecology ==
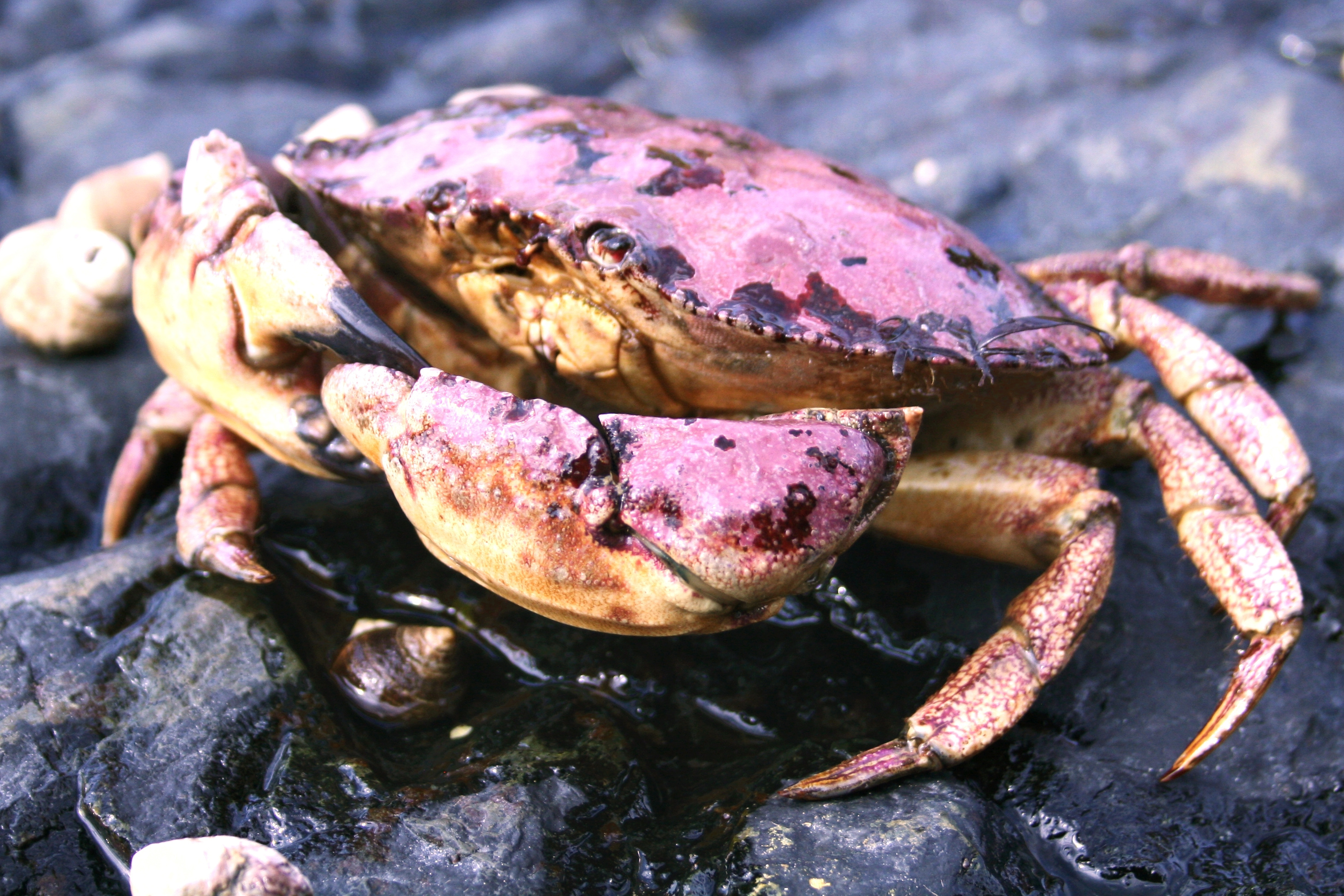
Jonah crabs inhabit intertidal and subtidal zones

The ecological zones at Acadia National Park, from highest to lowest elevation, include: nearly barren mountain summits; northern boreal and eastern deciduous forests on the mountainsides; freshwater lakes and ponds, as well as wetlands like marshes and swamps in the valleys between mountains; and the Atlantic shoreline with rocky and sandy beaches, intertidal and subtidal zones.

Tiny subalpine plants grow in the granite joints on mountaintops and on the downwind side of rocks. Stunted, gnarled trees also survive near the summits. Spruce-fir boreal forests cover much of the park. Stands of oak, maple, beech, and other hardwoods more typical of New England represent the eastern deciduous forest. pitch pines and scrub oaks inhabit isolated forests at their northeastern range limit, while jack pines reach the southern limit of their range in Acadia.

Fourteen great ponds and ten smaller ponds provide habitat for many fish and waterfowl species. More than 20% of the park is classified as wetland. Marshes and swamps form the transition between terrestrial and aquatic environments, maintaining biodiversity by providing a habitat for a wide range of species. Native wildlife frequent wetlands alongside species that are nesting, overwintering or migrating, such as birds along the Atlantic Flyway. Wetlands are composed of 37.5% marine (sea water), 31.6% palustrine (stagnant water), 20% estuarine (coastal, brackish water), 10.7% lacustrine (freshwater lakes and ponds), and 0.2% riverine (flowing streams). Approximately 53.6 mi (86.3 km) of perennial streams and 47.3 mi (76.1 km) of intermittent streams flow through the park, while about 50 mi (80 km) of shoreline surround 110 lakes and ponds encompassing 1,056.56 acres (427.57 ha; 1.65088 sq mi; 4.2757 km^{2}).

Intertidal flora and fauna inhabit more than 60 mi (97 km) of rocky coastline. The nutrient-rich marine waters cover the intertidal plants and animals twice a day. Pools of calm water form among the rocks around low tides, inhabited by starfish, dog whelks, blue mussels, sea cucumbers, and rockweed.

=== Flora ===
Spruce and fir boreal forest covers more than sixty percent of the park's naturally vegetated land, mixed with stands of oak, maple, beech, and other northern hardwoods. The Mount Desert Island portion of the park holds more than half of the vascular plant species found in Maine, ranging from subalpine plants on the granite summits down through bog, marsh, and meadow communities.

=== Fauna ===
The park's island setting supports 37 mammal species, among them black bear, moose, white-tailed deer, coyote, red fox, and beaver, along with seven reptiles, eleven amphibians, and more than 200 species of birds. Seals and whales are common offshore, and whale-watching trips run from Bar Harbor.

== Recreation ==
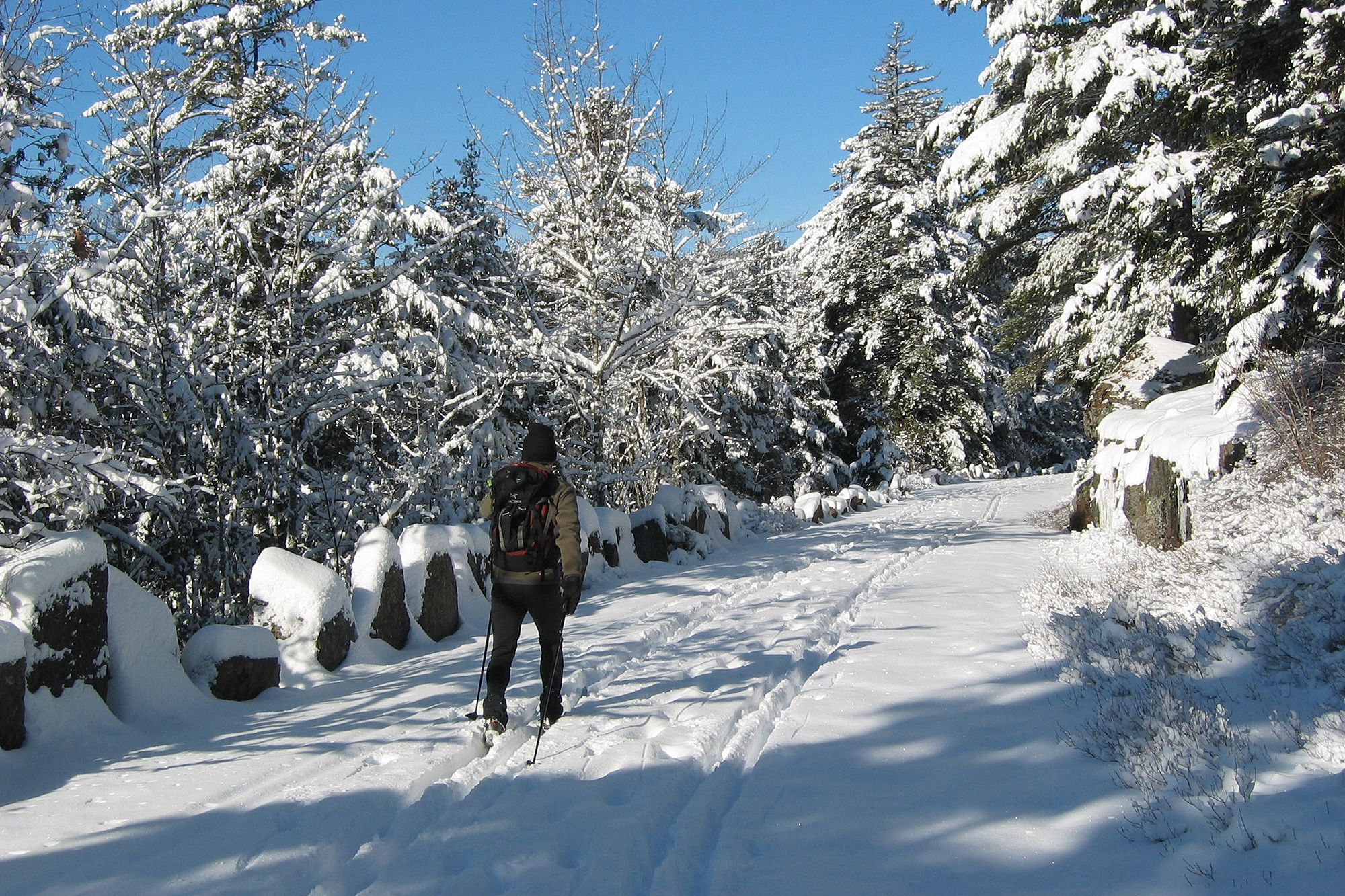
Cross-country skier on a carriage road

A ranger guides visitors at the park in the 1960s.

Motor vehicle touring along the 27-mile (43 km) Park Loop Road begins on April 15, if weather permits, and ends on December 1, unless significant snowfall closes it sooner. A two-mile (3.2 km) stretch of the Ocean Drive portion of the loop, from Schooner Head Road to Sand Beach and Otter Cliff, is plowed and open all year, as is Jordan Pond Road.

The coastline can be explored on guided boat trips or by sea kayak. Canoeing and kayaking are popular activities on accessible lakes and ponds. About 125 mi (201 km) of hiking trails traverse forests and mountains, while 45 mi (72 km) of carriage roads can be hiked or bicycled (motorized vehicles, including electric bikes, are prohibited). Both the 3.5-mile long Dorr Mountain Trail and the 4.5-mile (7.2 km) long Sargent Mountain Trail are listed as National Recreation Trails. Horseback riding is permitted on carriage roads and certain other park areas. Climbing is popular at 60 ft (18 m) high Otter Cliff, and at Great Head, Precipice, and South Bubble. Sand Beach offers seawater swimming and Echo Lake Beach offers freshwater swimming. In summer, ocean water temperature ranges from 50–60 °F (10–16 °C) while lake and pond temperatures range from 55–70 °F (13–21 °C).

Ranger-led programs from mid-May to mid-October introduce visitors to the park's diverse natural and cultural history. Park rangers offer short walks, longer hikes, boat cruises, evening amphitheater programs, and children's programs, as well as viewing of peregrine falcons and raptors.

Winter activities include hiking on trails using snowshoes, or traction footwear, and trekking poles, cross-country skiing on carriage roads, snowmobiling on the paved loop road, and ice fishing on frozen ponds and lakes.

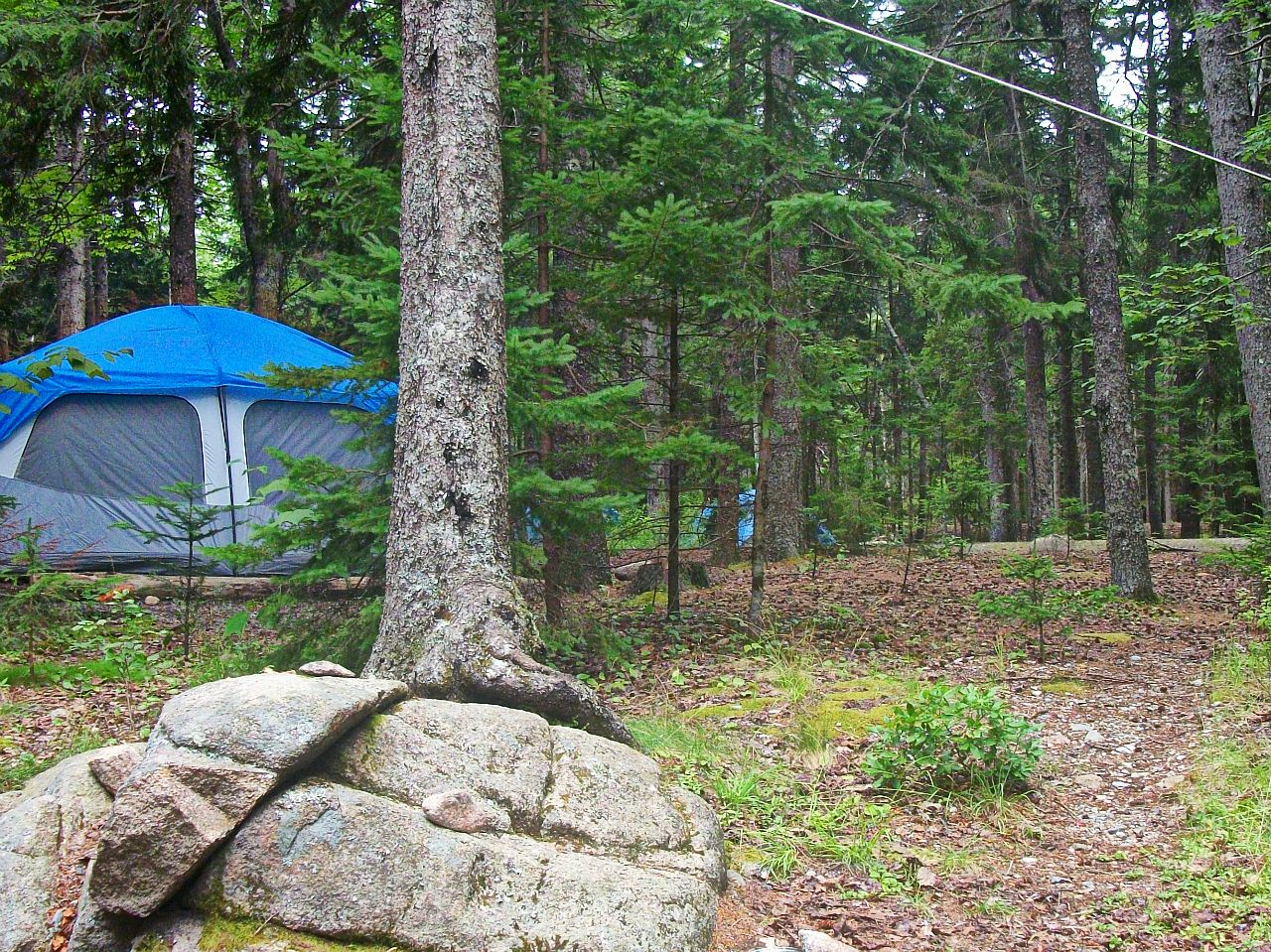
Tent at Blackwoods Campground

Mount Desert Island has two NPS campgrounds, constructed mainly by the Civilian Conservation Corps in the 1930s along with various park trails. Blackwoods Campground is located on the east side of the island, closer to the most popular sites, the carriage roads, and Bar Harbor. Seawall Campground is on the less crowded west side of the island. Schoodic Woods on the Schoodic Peninsula is the newest NPS campground, opened in 2015. Five lean-to shelters are available by advance reservation at Duck Harbor Campground on Isle au Haut. Blackwoods is open throughout the year, though only primitive walk-in camping by permit is possible in winter (December–March), while the others are open from late spring (mid-to-late May) to early autumn (late September to mid-October). Mount Desert Island also has eleven private campgrounds outside park boundaries, while two private campgrounds are on the Schoodic Peninsula, and one is on Isle au Haut.

The park hosts the annual Acadia Night Sky Festival, attracting speakers, researchers, photographers, and artists to the area.

== Current issues and challenges ==
=== Congestion ===
Park visitation has repeatedly set records, reaching about 4.07 million in 2021 and an all-time high of 4,079,318 recreation visits in 2025. The seasonal nature of the park means a concentration of visitors in the summer months that is beyond the capacity of park infrastructure. Congestion leads to lack of available parking and gridlock, requiring road closures. Traffic management places a toll on available rangers, competing with rescue operations that also see a sharp increase on peak attendance days.

The Island Explorer bus system is offered in part to reduce congestion; it carried its 10 millionth passenger in September 2024. A portion of park entrance fees partially funds the service. A $23.5 million federal grant is funding a planned conversion of its propane fleet to electric buses, expected around 2028.

In 2021, the park began requiring a vehicle reservation to drive up the Cadillac Summit Road during the busy season, roughly late May to late October, to ease traffic and parking congestion on Cadillac Mountain. The reservations cost $6 per vehicle in addition to a park entrance pass and are sold only through Recreation.gov, in timed "Sunrise" and "Daytime" entry windows. It is the only part of the park that requires a vehicle reservation.

=== Environmental changes ===
Since the park's founding in 1916, climate change has lengthened the growing season by nearly two months. A longer growing season threatens native plants and invites invasive species that thrive in the longer, warmer summer season. An expanded warm season also lengthens the tourism season, placing further strain on park resources. Changes in rainfall patterns have also taxed park infrastructure, increasing the maintenance required to control erosion and protect the historic carriage roads.

=== Deferred maintenance ===
As of fiscal year 2025, Acadia had an estimated $138 million in deferred maintenance and repairs, part of an NPS-wide backlog of about $24 billion. Under the Great American Outdoors Act of 2020, the park funded a $32.6 million year-round maintenance facility in Bar Harbor and a $7.8 million rehabilitation of the Schoodic district's water and wastewater systems. The backlog compounds existing problems in environmental management and traffic congestion, as infrastructure to manage traffic flow cannot be built until existing infrastructure is properly maintained. Trail and wilderness restoration is also deferred due to insufficient funding. Additionally, the large number of park entrances creates issues with fee compliance, costing additional lost revenue.

== Facilities and support ==
=== Visitor centers ===
Six visitor information centers are located in or near the park, including the main visitor center at Hulls Cove (northwest of Bar Harbor), a nature center at Sieur de Monts (south of Bar Harbor), an information center on Thompson Island (along the roadway to Mount Desert Island), another information center at Village Green in Bar Harbor, a historical museum in Islesford on Little Cranberry Island, and the Rockefeller Welcome Center on the Schoodic Peninsula. The Rockefeller Welcome Center is the only one open throughout the year, though it is closed on winter weekends; the others are all closed in winter.

=== Schoodic Education and Research Center ===
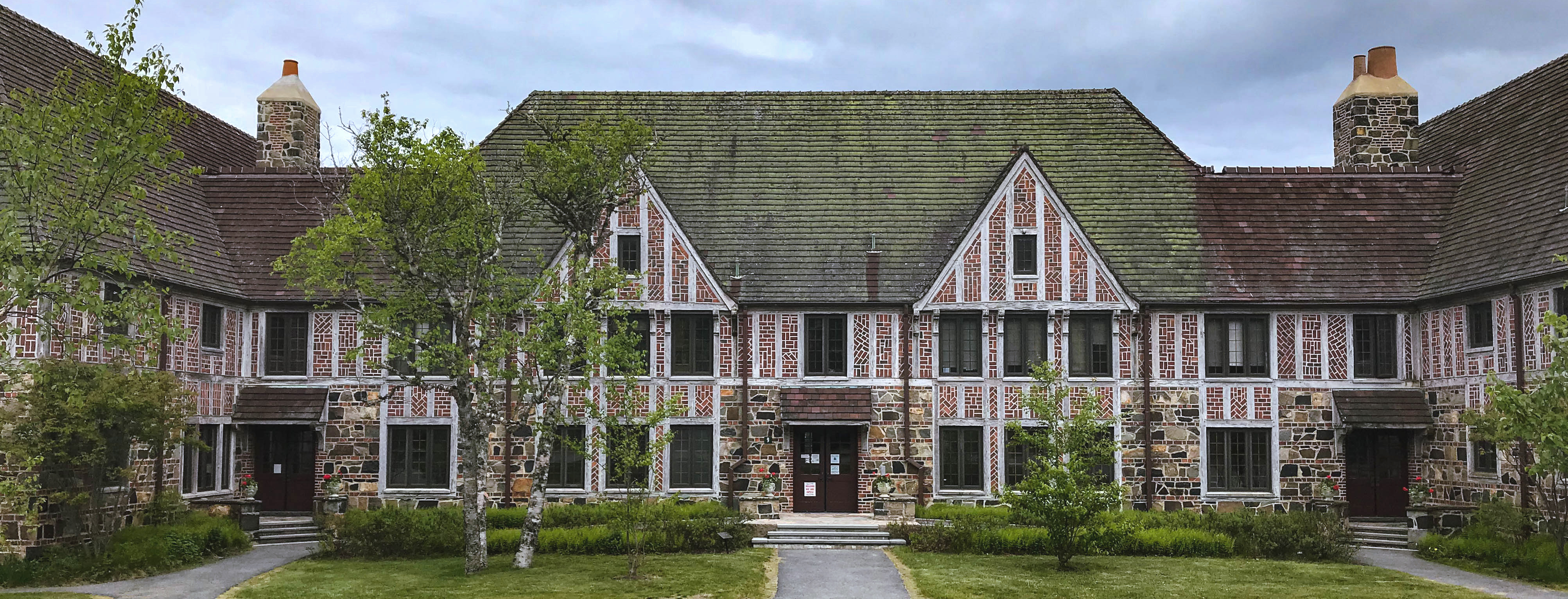
Schoodic Education and Research Center

After the naval base on the Schoodic Peninsula closed in 2002, the National Park Service (NPS) acquired the land and established the Schoodic Education and Research Center (SERC). The SERC campus is managed by the nonprofit Schoodic Institute and the NPS in a public-private partnership as one of 19 NPS research learning centers in the country. The center is dedicated to supporting scientific research in the park, providing professional development for teachers, and educating students.

=== Friends of Acadia ===
In 1986, a group of Acadia-area residents and park volunteers formed the membership-based nonprofit organization Friends of Acadia (FOA) to organize volunteer efforts and private philanthropy for the benefit of Acadia National Park. The group's first major achievement was a $3.4 million endowment, raised between 1991 and 1996, to maintain the park's carriage road system in perpetuity, which leveraged federal funds to fully restore the road system. Subsequent projects and partnerships included Acadia Trails Forever, the first endowed trail system in an American national park with $13 million raised between 1999 and 2001, and the Island Explorer, a free, propane-powered bus system serving the park and local communities since 1999.

The Acadia Youth Conservation Corps was established by FOA and endowed by an anonymous donor in 1999 to employ 16 high school students in maintenance of trails and carriage roads in the summer months. FOA also partnered with park administration to establish the Acadia Youth Technology Team in 2011, an initiative involving local teenaged interns and college-age team leaders supplied with professional-quality imaging tools to foster an appreciation of nature and environmental stewardship, especially among younger people. The team has since been renamed the Acadia Digital Media Team.

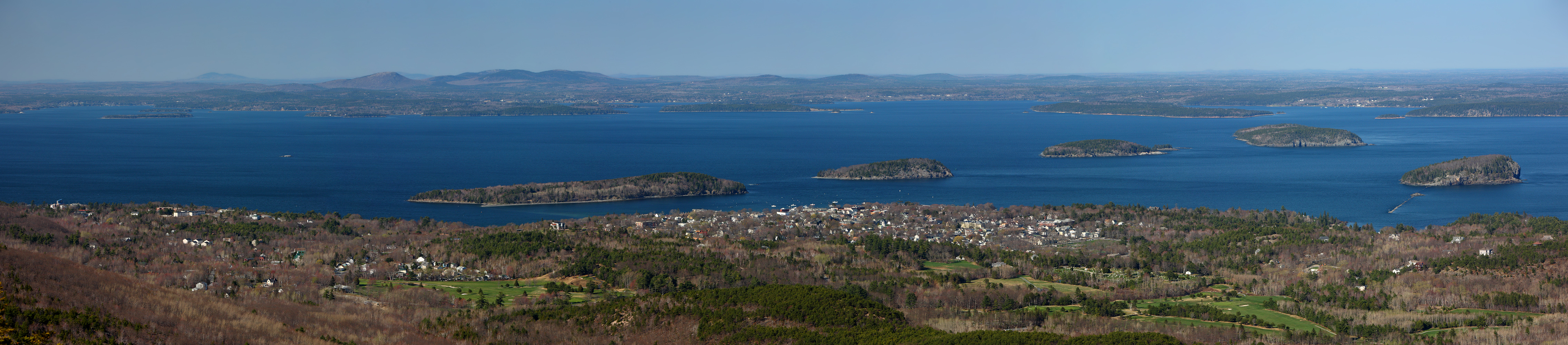
Frenchman Bay with Bar Island on the left and the Porcupine Islands around the town of Bar Harbor from the summit of Cadillac Mountain

== See also ==
- List of birds of Acadia National Park
- List of national parks of the United States
- Acadia National Park carriage paths, bridges and gatehouses
- Great Head Trail
- National Register of Historic Places listings in Acadia National Park
- Towns on Mount Desert Island:
  - Bar Harbor
  - Mount Desert
  - Northeast Harbor
  - Southwest Harbor
  - Tremont
- Winter Harbor (Schoodic Peninsula)
