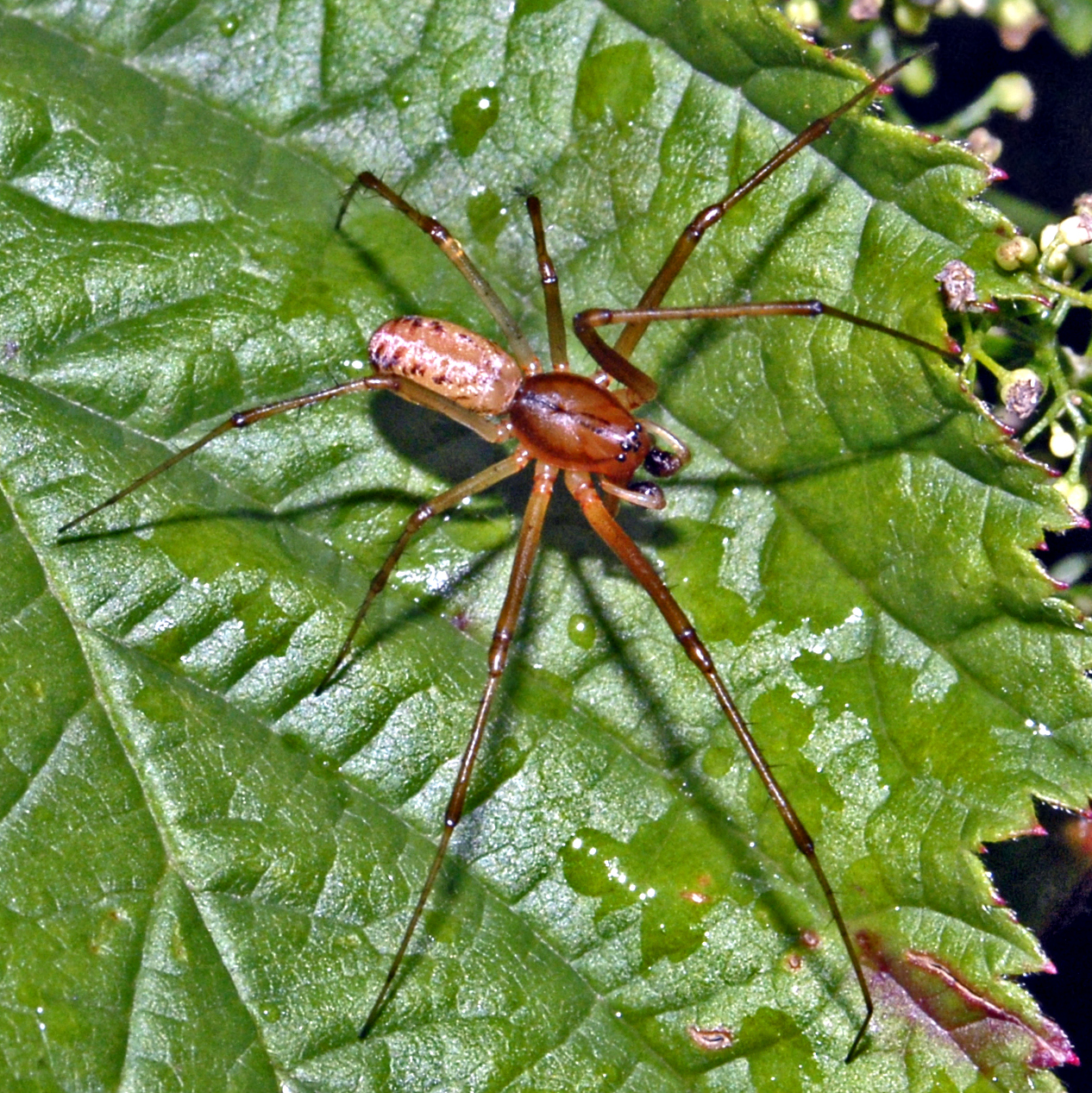
- Linyphia species

Scientific classification
- Kingdom: Animalia
- Phylum: Arthropoda
- Subphylum: Chelicerata
- Class: Arachnida
- Order: Araneae
- Infraorder: Araneomorphae
- Family: Linyphiidae
- Subfamily: Linyphiinae
- Genus: Linyphia; Latreille, 1804

Type species
- Araneus triangularis Clerck, 1757

Species
- 70, see text
- blue: reported countries (WSC)

= Linyphia =

Linyphia Temporal range: Palaeogene– Present

Genus of spiders

Linyphia is a genus of dwarf spiders that was first described by Pierre André Latreille in 1804. The name is Greek, and means "thread-weaver" or "linen maker".

== Distribution ==
Linyphia is found on all continents except Antarctica.

== Species ==
As of January 2026, this genus includes seventy species:

- L. adstricta (Keyserling, 1886) – United States
- L. albipunctata O. Pickard-Cambridge, 1885 – Pakistan
- L. alpicola van Helsdingen, 1969 – Alps (France, Italy, Switzerland, Germany, Austria)
- L. armata (Keyserling, 1891) – Brazil
- L. bicuspis (F. O. Pickard-Cambridge, 1902) – Mexico
- L. bifasciata (F. O. Pickard-Cambridge, 1902) – Costa Rica
- L. bisignata (Banks, 1909) – Costa Rica
- L. calcarifera (Keyserling, 1886) – Panama, Colombia
- L. catalina Gertsch, 1951 – United States
- L. chiridota (Thorell, 1895) – Myanmar, Thailand
- L. clara (Keyserling, 1891) – Brazil
- L. confinis O. Pickard-Cambridge, 1902 – Guatemala
- L. consanguinea O. Pickard-Cambridge, 1885 – Pakistan, India?
- L. cylindrata (Keyserling, 1891) – Brazil
- L. decorata (Keyserling, 1891) – Brazil
- L. duplicata (F. O. Pickard-Cambridge, 1902) – Mexico, Guatemala
- L. eiseni Banks, 1898 – Mexico
- L. falculifera (F. O. Pickard-Cambridge, 1902) – Costa Rica
- L. ferentaria (Keyserling, 1886) – Peru
- L. gaoshidongensis Irfan, Zhang & Peng, 2022 – China
- L. horaea (Keyserling, 1886) – Colombia
- L. hortensis Sundevall, 1830 – Europe, Turkey, Caucasus, Russia (Europe to Far East), Kazakhstan, Iran, Central Asia
- L. hospita (Keyserling, 1886) – Colombia
- L. hui Hu, 2001 – China
- L. lambda (F. O. Pickard-Cambridge, 1902) – Guatemala
- L. lehmanni Simon, 1903 – Argentina
- L. leucosternon White, 1841 – Brazil
- L. limatula Simon, 1904 – Chile
- L. limbata (F. O. Pickard-Cambridge, 1902) – Mexico, Guatemala
- L. linzhiensis Hu, 2001 – China
- L. longiceps (Keyserling, 1891) – Brazil
- L. longispina (F. O. Pickard-Cambridge, 1902) – Mexico
- L. ludibunda (Keyserling, 1886) – Peru
- L. lurida (Keyserling, 1886) – Colombia
- L. maculosa (Banks, 1909) – Costa Rica
- L. maura Thorell, 1875 – Portugal, Spain, France, Italy (Sardinia), Morocco, Algeria, Greece, Cyprus
- L. melanoprocta Mello-Leitão, 1944 – Argentina
- L. menyuanensis Hu, 2001 – China
- L. mimonti Simon, 1885 – Italy (incl. Sicily), Albania, Greece (incl. Crete), Lebanon, Israel
- L. monticolens Roewer, 1942 – Peru
- L. nepalensis Wunderlich, 1983 – Nepal
- L. nitens Urquhart, 1893 – Australia (Tasmania)
- L. obesa Thorell, 1875 – Sweden
- L. obscurella Roewer, 1942 – Brazil
- L. octopunctata (Chamberlin & Ivie, 1936) – Panama
- L. oligochronia (Keyserling, 1886) – Peru
- L. orophila Thorell, 1877 – United States
- L. pengdangensis Irfan, Zhang & Peng, 2022 – China
- L. peruana (Keyserling, 1886) – Peru
- L. phaeochorda Rainbow, 1920 – Australia (Norfolk Is.)
- L. phyllophora Thorell, 1890 – Indonesia (Sumatra)
- L. polita Blackwall, 1870 – Italy (Sicily)
- L. postica (Banks, 1909) – Costa Rica
- L. rita Gertsch, 1951 – United States
- L. rubella Keyserling, 1886 – Peru
- L. rubriceps (Keyserling, 1891) – Brazil
- L. rustica (F. O. Pickard-Cambridge, 1902) – Mexico
- L. sagana Dönitz & Strand, 1906 – Japan
- L. sikkimensis Tikader, 1970 – India
- L. songziyuanensis Irfan, Zhang & Peng, 2025 – China
- L. subluteae Urquhart, 1893 – Australia (Tasmania)
- L. tauphora Chamberlin, 1928 – United States
- L. tenuipalpis Simon, 1884 – Europe, Morocco, Algeria, Turkey, Caucasus, Russia (Europe to South Siberia)
- L. textrix Walckenaer, 1841 – United States
- L. triangularis (Clerck, 1757) – Europe, Turkey, Caucasus, Russia (Europe to Far East), Iran, Kazakhstan, China. Introduced to Canada, United States
- L. triangularoides Schenkel, 1936 – China
- L. tuasivia Marples, 1955 – Samoa, Cook Islands (Aitutaki)
- L. tubernaculofaciens Hingston, 1932 – Guyana
- L. virgata (Keyserling, 1886) – Peru
- L. yangmingensis Yin, 2012 – China
