= Presumpscot Formation =

The Presumpscot formation is a late Pleistocene glacial deposit of predominantly submarine clays, located along the Maine and New Hampshire coast and inland along their major river valleys. It consists of primarily silt- and clay-sized particles formed from the glacial abrasion of the feldspars, quartz, and micas of the region, carried by glacial meltwater and deposited below sea level before subsequent crust rising (isostatic rebound) elevated the deposits up to more than 300 feet (91 m). It is named after the Presumpscot River where large amounts of the characteristic blue-gray clay are found.

Fossilized remains of marine organisms are found interspersed among the deposits.

It was a historically significant resource for the production of brick, though little of that industry remains.

Pollen found in the clays near Portland, Maine, indicate spruce forests, with low proportions of pines, about 11500 BP.
