= Sutton Island =

Island in Hancock County, Maine, United States

Coordinates: 44°16′21.8″N 68°15′22.6″W

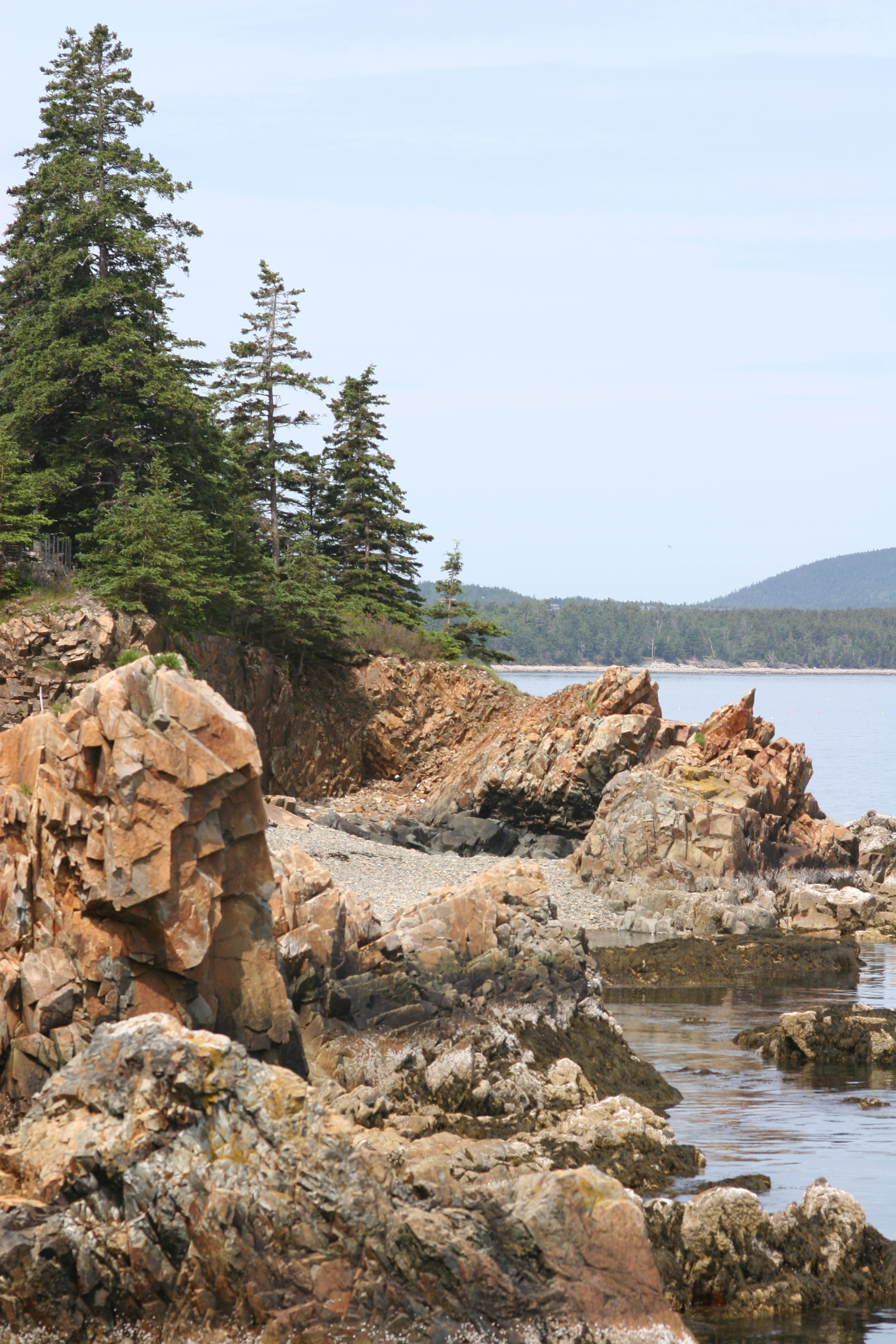
The rocky north coast of Sutton Island, ME. Eight foot tides are typical here. Mount Desert Island is visible in the Background.

Sutton Island, in Hancock County, Maine, United States, is a small, private island south of Mount Desert Island, and north of Cranberry Isles. Its dimensions are roughly 2.1 km on its east–west axis by 1.1 km north to south.

The island is one of the five Cranberry Isles; the others are Great Cranberry Island, Islesford (also known as Little Cranberry Island), Baker Island, and Bear Island. The island has only a summertime population. Sutton island is the second smallest of the Cranberry Islands, and is close to Northeast Harbor.

== History ==
Harvard University formerly owned two properties on the island, each with a seaside home. One was donated to the university in 1958, the other donated to the university around 1942. The homes were infrequently used; Harvard sold them both in 2007 in light of mounting maintenance costs.

From at least the 1950s until 2008, the island received mail service via a private ferry, which delivered mail to the island by leaving it "in a specially marked trash can on the dock for recipients to pick up." The U.S. Postal Service ended the practice in 2008 due to security concerns; residents of the island now must journey by boat to the Northeast Harbor post office, to retrieve their mail.

== Population, transportation, and points of interest ==
The island's population is seasonal; it is currently inhabited by humans only in summertime, although in the past Sutton Island had year-round residents.

The poet Rachel Field maintained a summer home on the island.

The island has no roads, bridge to the mainland, nor airstrip. It is primarily accessed by mail boat from Northeast Harbor or by ferry or water taxi from Southwest Harbor, Maine.

There is a cemetery on Sutton Island.

== Wildlife ==
Sutton Island has a "100-year-old osprey nest perched on an outcropping of rocks."

Sutton Island is also known for the tall tale legend of Christopher Adams. A seafarer that was stranded via shipwreck on the island in the early 1800’s. His infamous whistle is still heard by inhabitants to this day.
