= Islesford Historical Museum and Blue Duck Ships Store =

- Islesford Historical Museum and Blue Ducks Ships Store
- U.S. National Register of Historic Places
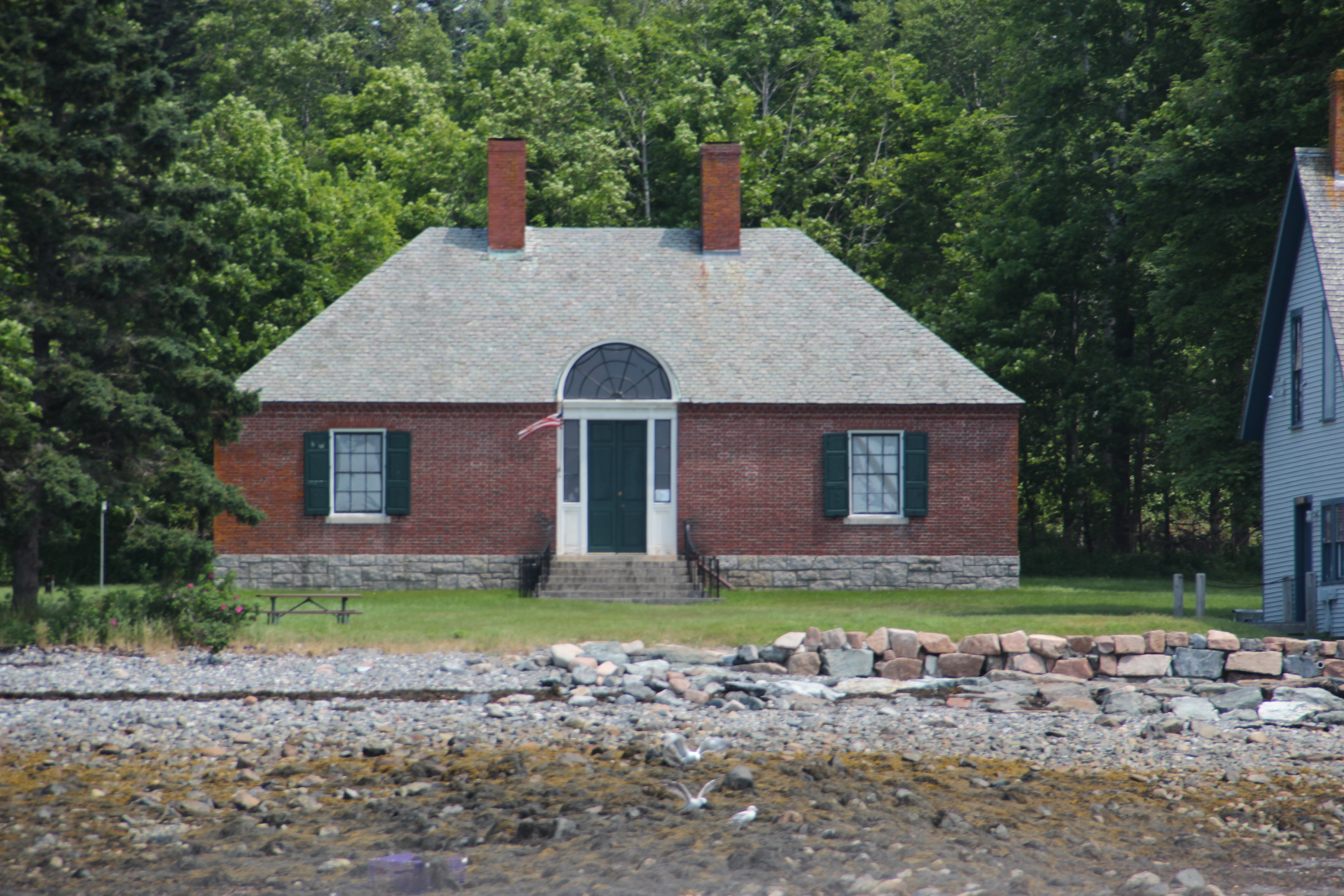
- Islesford Historical Museum

- Location within Maine Location within the United States
- Location: Little Cranberry Island, Islesford, Maine
- Coordinates: 44°15′42″N 68°14′25″W
- Area: 1.3 acres (0.53 ha)
- Architect: Edmund B. Gilchrist
- Architectural style: Colonial Revival, Colonial
- NRHP reference No.: 80000224
- Added to NRHP: September 30, 1980

The Islesford Historical Museum and Blue Duck Ships' Store are related historical exhibits on Little Cranberry Island in Maine, USA, within the boundaries of Acadia National Park.

== History ==
The Blue Duck Ships' Store was a ship's chandlery, built about 1850 by Edwin Hadlock. The chandlery operated until about 1875, when it became a store, the Isleford Market, then apartments after 1912. Some time later, George Hadlock, Edwin's son, sold the building to William Otis Sawtelle, a physics professor at Haverford College who spent his summers on the island. Sawtelle was a founder of the Islesford Historical Society, and after 1919 he maintained the store as the headquarters for the society and as a museum. Sawtelle named the store the "Blue Duck Ships' Store". In 1927, a new facility was built to be a museum. The Islesford Historical Museum took over the Blue Duck collection, which included ships' manifests, historical artifacts and genealogical information. Such collections and purpose-built museums were unusual at the time and the Islesford Historical Museum represents one of the first of its kind.

== Description ==
The Blue Duck Ships' Store is a 1½ story frame building measuring about 28.5 feet (8.7 m) by 49 feet (15 m), resting on a rubble stone foundation. The plain weatherboarded structure sits at the water's edge, with an irregular pattern of windows, most of which were replaced in the early 20th century. Doors are placed in the sides and ends, some crowned with a simple pediment. The Blue Duck was leased to Islesford Boatworks, a non-profit organization that teaches traditional wooden boatbuilding to all ages and works to serve the island, its people, and the working waterfront.

The Islesford Historical Museum is a 1½ story fireproof brick structure built in 1927 in the Georgian Colonial Revival style. The building is arranged with a 60-foot (18 m) by 30-foot (9.1 m) main block and a 30-foot (9.1 m) by 25-foot (7.6 m) subsidiary block, both with hipped roofs. The main block has two prominent interior chimneys and a formal entrance with a semicircular dormer-fanlight. The museum rests on a quarry-faced random ashlar stone base.

The buildings, the Sawtelle gravesite and 1.3 acres (0.53 ha) were acquired by the National Park Service in 1948. The property was listed on the National Register of Historic Places on September 30, 1980.

== See also ==
- National Register of Historic Places listings in Hancock County, Maine
- National Register of Historic Places listings in Acadia National Park
