= Charles Wadsworth (artist) =

American artist and poet

- Born: March 3, 1917; Ridgewood, New Jersey
- Died: August 21, 2002 (aged 85); Boston, Massachusetts
- Known for: Printmaking (Collagraphy), Painting, Poetry, Illustration
- Style: Modernism

Charles E. Wadsworth Jr. (March 3, 1917 – August 21, 2002) was an American painter, printmaker, and poet. He was born in Ridgewood, New Jersey and moved to Cranberry Isles, Maine in the 1940s. His art and writing frequently deal with themes of nature and the "austere enchantments" of life on Maine's islands, as Wadsworth himself put it. In addition to his work as a visual artist and poet, he also illustrated books and, with his wife Jean, ran a small publishing house called The Tidal Press.

Wadsworth studied at the Art Students League of New York and exhibited work at the Whitney Museum and elsewhere. His printmaking and illustrations made use of modern techniques such as collagraphy; he also produced oil paintings and drawings that are held in the collections of various regional and national museums, along with several of his prints. In 2009, four pieces by Wadsworth were included in a retrospective exhibition at the Portland Museum of Art that featured works from the larger community of artists who had been active in the Cranberry Isles during the second half of the twentieth century, of which Wadsworth was the first (others included Ashley Bryan, Gretna Campbell, Robert LaHotan, and John Heliker).

Wadsworth published and illustrated multiple volumes of his own poetry, in addition to illustrating several works by other writers—including Richard Wilbur's Seed Leaves: Homage to R.F. and texts by Christopher Fry. He was also involved in the literary and cultural life of Great Cranberry Island and often delivered public readings of his poems in the Island's church. A film was made about his life; and several documents, photographs, and other items associated with Wadsworth can be found at the Great Cranberry Island Historical Society.

== Collections ==
Works by Wadsworth are held in the following museums' collections:

- Addison Gallery of American Art
- Bates College Museum of Art
- Farnsworth Museum of Art
- Portland Museum of Art
- Smithsonian American Art Museum
- Worcester Art Museum
- Yale University Art Gallery

== Bibliography ==
=== Works of poetry ===
- Views from the Island: Poetry and Prints. The Tidal Press, 1978.
- A Tourist in Ludlow and Other Poems: Poetry and Watercolors. The Tidal Press, 1984.
- Dachshunds and Other Selected Prejudices. The Tidal Press, 1990.

=== Books illustrated by Wadsworth (selected) ===
- Christopher Fry. Death is a Kind of Love. The Tidal Press, 1979.
- Christopher Fry. Root and Sky: Poetry from the Plays of Christopher Fry. Rampant Lions Press, 1975.
- William H. Matchett. Fireweed and Other Poems. The Tidal Press, 1980.
- Leslie Norris. Islands Off Maine. The Tidal Press, 1977.
- Paul Petrie. Strange Gravity: Songs Physical and Metaphysical. The Tidal Press, 1984.
- Richard Wilbur. Seed Leaves: Homage to R.F., Godine, c. 1974.
