= National Register of Historic Places listings in Acadia National Park =

This is a list of the National Register of Historic Places listings in Acadia National Park.

This is intended to be a complete list of the properties and districts on the National Register of Historic Places in Acadia National Park, Maine, United States. The locations of National Register properties and districts for which the latitude and longitude coordinates are included below, may be seen in a Google map.

There are eleven properties and districts listed on the National Register in the park.

This National Park Service list is complete through NPS recent listings posted March 14, 2025.

== Current listings ==
	Name on the Register	Image	Date listed	Location	City or town	Description
1	Robert Abbe Museum of Stone Antiquities	Robert Abbe Museum of Stone Antiquities	January 19, 1983 (#83000451)	South of Bar Harbor off State Route 3; 44°21′40″N 68°12′30″W	Bar Harbor	
2	Baker Island Light Station	Baker Island Light Station	March 14, 1988 (#88000046)	Baker Island in Acadia National Park; 44°14′28″N 68°11′56″W	Islesford	First light station serving Mount Desert Island—established in 1828—with a surviving 1855 light tower and keeper's house.
3	Bass Harbor Head Light Station	Bass Harbor Head Light Station	January 21, 1988 (#87002273)	Bass Harbor Head; 44°13′19″N 68°20′16″W	Bass Harbor	
4	Bear Island Light Station	Bear Island Light Station	March 14, 1988 (#88000043)	Bear Island, Acadia National Park; 44°17′00″N 68°16′14″W	Northeast Harbor	Light station established in 1839 to serve Northeast Harbor, with a surviving 1889 light tower and keeper's house and 1905 outbuildings.
5	Blackwoods Campground	Blackwoods Campground	June 29, 2007 (#07000612)	State Route 233, Eagle Lake Rd. 44°18′38″N 68°12′15″W	Bar Harbor	CCC-built campground on the east side of the park.
6	Carriage Paths, Bridges and Gatehouses	Carriage Paths, Bridges and Gatehouses	November 14, 1979 (#79000131)	Acadia National Park and vicinity 44°20′32″N 68°15′30″W	Acadia National Park	Network of scenic carriage roads with 13 bridges and two gatehouse complexes, established 1919–1931 by John D. Rockefeller Jr. for automobile-free recreation by high-society vacationers. Now open to non-motorized use by the public.
7	Fernald Point Prehistoric Site		July 21, 1978 (#78000164)	Fernald Point; 44°17′53″N 68°18′35″W	Southwest Harbor	
8	Islesford Historical Museum and Blue Duck Ships Store	Islesford Historical Museum and Blue Duck Ships Store	September 30, 1980 (#80000224)	Little Cranberry Island; 44°15′42″N 68°14′25″W	Islesford	
9	Schoodic Peninsula Historic District		June 29, 2007 (#07000614)	1.5 miles south of State Route 186; 44°22′30″N 68°03′50″W	Winter Harbor	
10	Seawall Campground	Seawall Campground	June 29, 2007 (#07000613)	State Route 233, Eagle Lake Rd. 44°14′26″N 68°18′16″W	Bar Harbor	
11	U.S. Naval Radio Station- Apartment Building and Power House	U.S. Naval Radio Station- Apartment Building and Power House	July 3, 2013 (#13000533)	Schoodic Peninsula unit 44°20′10″N 68°03′33″W	Winter Harbor vicinity	

== See also ==
- National Register of Historic Places listings in Hancock County, Maine
- National Register of Historic Places listings in Maine
