= Penikese Island =

Island in Dukes County, Massachusetts, United States

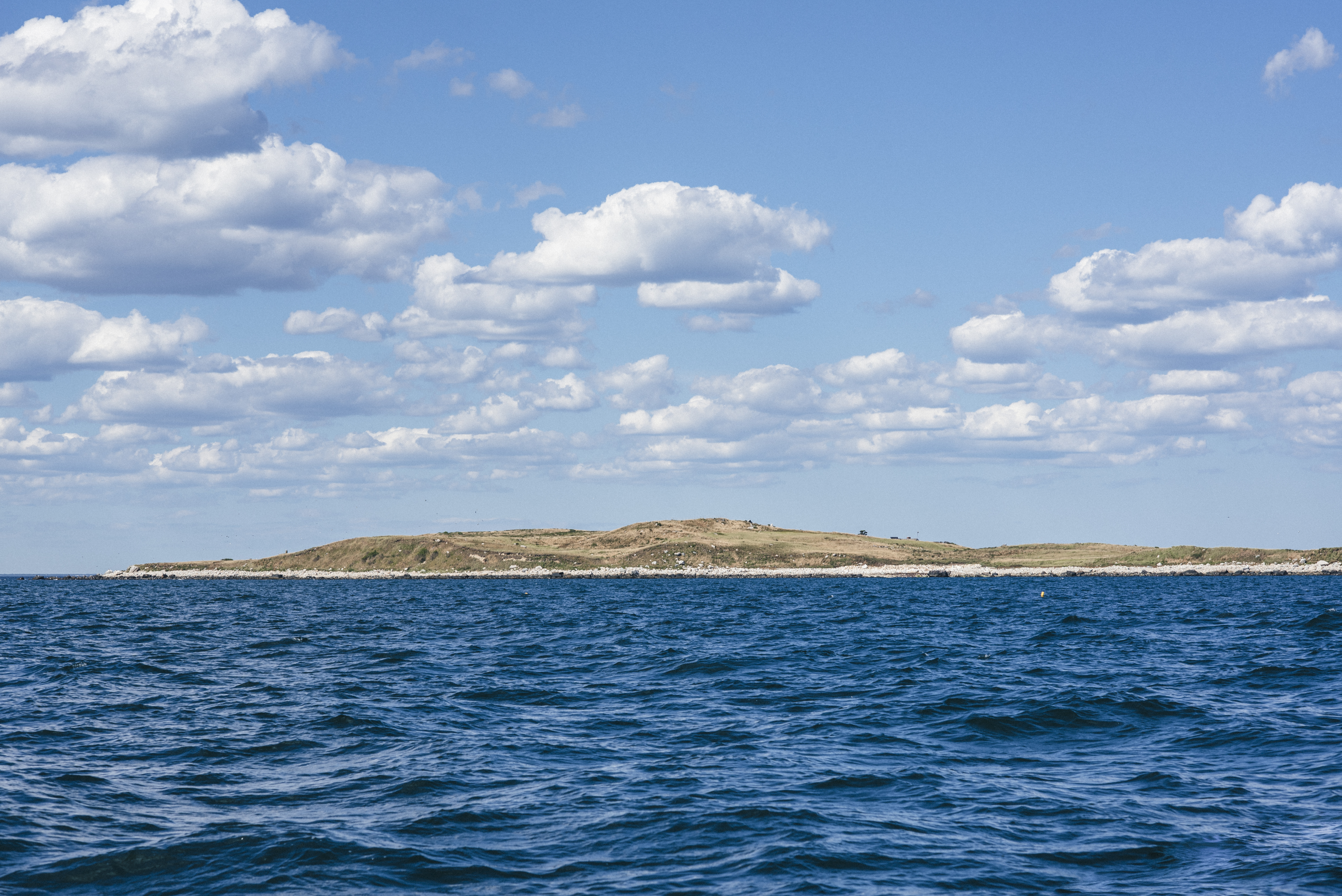
- Penikese Island from Middle Ledge

- Location within Massachusetts Location within the United States

Geography
- Location: North of Cuttyhunk Island
- Coordinates: 41°27′00″N 70°55′23″W
- Archipelago: Elizabeth Islands
- Total islands: 1
- Area: .117 sq mi (0.30 km^{2})
- Highest elevation: 52 ft (15.8 m)

Administration
- United States
- State: Massachusetts
- County: Dukes County
- Town: Gosnold

Additional information
- Postal code: 02713
- Area code: 508 / 774

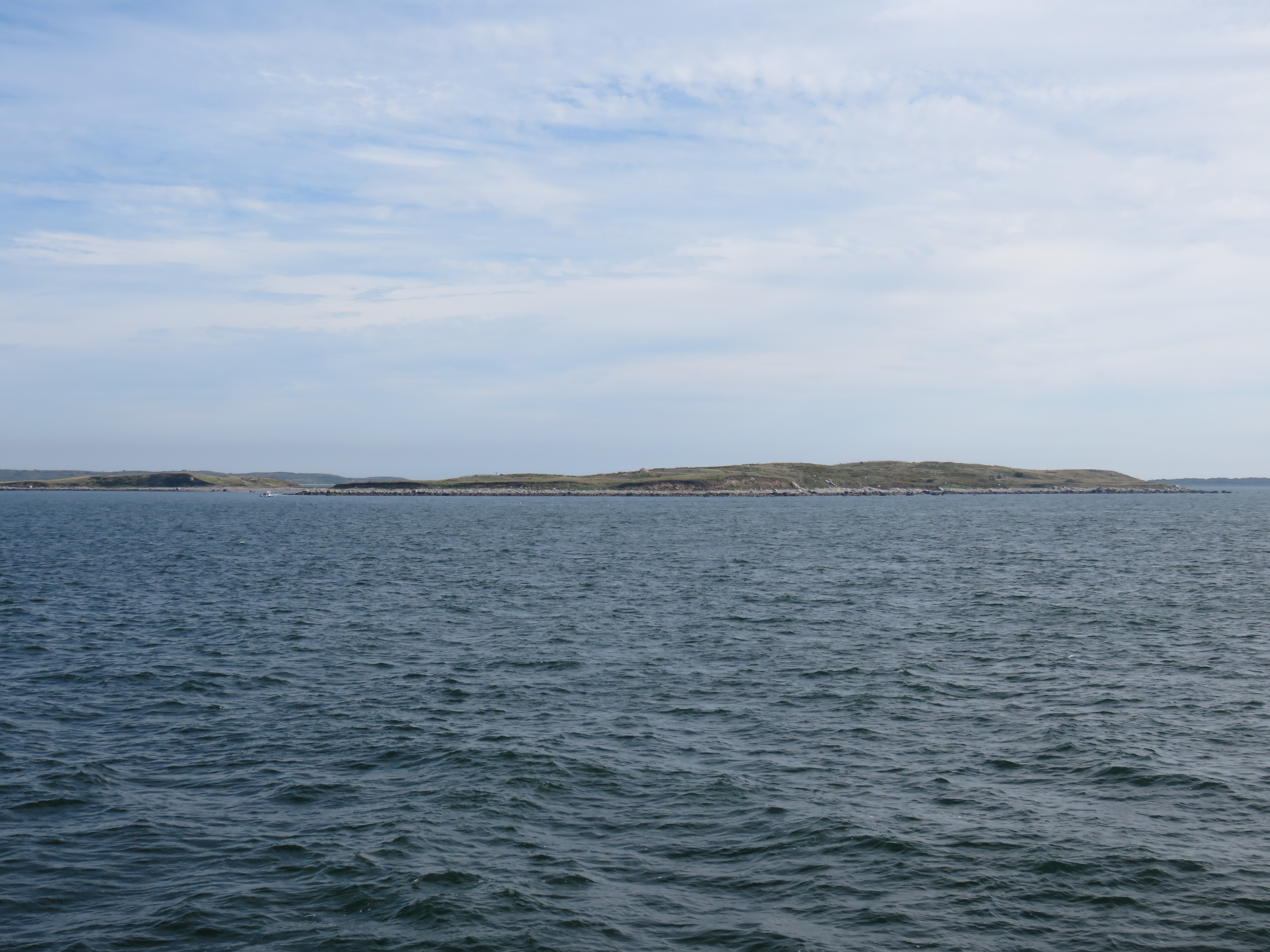
Penikese Island from the north in 2015

Penikese Island is a 75-acre (0.117 mi^{2}) island off the coast of Massachusetts, United States, in Buzzards Bay. It is one of the Elizabeth Islands, which make up the town of Gosnold, Massachusetts. Penikese is located near the west end of the Elizabeth island chain.

== History ==
Penikese Island entered the historical record in 1602 when the English explorer Bartholomew Gosnold and some of his crew visited the island. Their visit frightened four visiting Wampanoag Indians into hiding, and the explorers stole their canoe.

Originally tree-covered, at some later time the tree cover was lost, and the island was later used for pasturing sheep. To this day, it remains primarily grass-covered. Ownership changed hands several times before the island was purchased by John Anderson, a businessman, who used it for vacationing.

In early 1873, Louis Agassiz, the famous Swiss-American naturalist, persuaded Anderson to give him the island and $50,000 to endow a school for natural history where students would study nature instead of books. The school opened in July 1873, initially headed by Louis Agassiz. Following his death in December, his son Alexander Agassiz ran the school. The school was closed following a fire in 1875, but some of the former students opened in 1888 the Marine Biological Laboratory, in nearby Woods Hole.

In 1904, following local opposition to two previously selected sites on the mainland, the state of Massachusetts purchased the island for $25,000 to use as a leprosy hospital to isolate and treat all Massachusetts residents with the disease. When opened, the Penikese Island Leper Hospital had five patients. After being open for 16 years, it was closed in 1921 and the thirteen patients were transferred to the federal leprosy hospital in Carville, Louisiana. At the closing of the hospital, the state burnt and then dynamited the buildings, and all that remains of it are stone gate posts and a small cemetery.

The island remains under the ownership of the Commonwealth of Massachusetts and is primarily a bird sanctuary. There is no permanent population on the island. A residential school for troubled boys operated on the island from 1973 until 2011, and now offers environmental education experiences. There may also be visitors and researchers on island from time to time, as the island is publicly owned and is still used at times for biological research. Beginning in 1990, the island was used as a test site for efforts to reintroduce the endangered American burying beetle, which appears to have succeeded; by 1997 the population had persisted for at least five generations since the last release.

== Penikese Island School ==
The Penikese Island School (PIS) was founded in 1973 as a non-profit 501(c)(3). PIS was a private rehabilitation school for teenage delinquent boys. The goal of the school was to teach by example, modeling responsible adult behavior in a spartan environment. Boys were exposed to life with earnest adults who enforced a code of behavior, as an alternative to incarceration. PIS aimed to provide an experience they hoped would help boys remanded to involuntary custody become productive citizens, instead of developing into adult criminals.

Having a school on the island is a benefit to the state and its efforts to protect endangered nesting birds, as the presence of staff on the island helps deter illegal hunters and campers.

During the mid-1990s, the original founders of PIS were no longer in charge. New leadership continued the program to 2011, when funding from the state of Massachusetts was no longer available. In the fall of 2015, a long-term opioid-addiction treatment facility named Penikese began operation on the island. According to several newspapers, the treatment center shut down in 2017 after a lack of funding.

In 2019, PIS began offering programs with a new mission focused on environmental education. The new mission is to provide students with access to experiential, nature-based educational programs. PIS currently operates school trips during the academic year and a STEAM camp during the summer.

== In popular culture ==
- Lauren Wolk's 2017 young adult novel Beyond the Bright Sea is set in the aftermath of the closure of the Penikese Island Leper Hospital, and the main characters frequently visit and explore the island.
- Lulu Miller's 2020 book Why Fish Don't Exist about the life of David Starr Jordan features Jordan's time on Penikese Island studying as a naturalist with Louis Agassiz.
- Heidi Chiavaroli's 2022 book "Hope Beyond the Waves" is a historical fiction book exploring the lives of leprosy patients on the island.
