= American People's School =

Cooperative adult school (1934–1945)

Coordinates: 40.8824°N 73.8941°W

The American People's School of New York City, based in the Kingsbridge Heights section of the Bronx, was a 20th-century American cooperative adult school based on the Danish folk school model. Founded by Soren A. Mathiasen, it existed from 1934 to 1945. Classes were offered in "music, painting, propaganda analysis, handicrafts, and the arts and sciences."

== History ==
The school was located at 67 Stevenson Place. As explained in one memoir, "Forty [creative artists] came to New York on grants and endowments from all over the United States...They were in a building which belonged to the Ruth St. Denis School for Dance and which had been converted into studios for these young artists. In return for room and board, they were required to teach other students who would come to the school on a daily basis...There was only one paid person in the school, and that was me, the cook." The School for Dance, run by Ruth St. Denis and Ted Shawn, was also known as the Denishawn House, prior to 1934.

Students of Carl Nelson when he taught at the school included painter Charles Wadsworth and photographer George Daniell. A group called Squares and Rounds used the space to demonstrate historic American dances.
