= Freedom Over Me =

Picture book by Ashley Bryan

Freedom Over Me: Eleven Slaves, Their Lives and Dreams Brought to Life by Ashley Bryan
- Author: Ashley Bryan
- Illustrator: Ashley Bryan
- Language: English
- Set in: 1828, southern United States
- Publisher: Atheneum Books
- Publication date: September 2016
- Pages: 56
- Awards: 2017 Newbery Honor
- ISBN: 9781481456906
- Website: Publisher's website

Freedom Over Me: Eleven Slaves, Their Lives and Dreams Brought to Life by Ashley Bryan is a young adult picture book written and illustrated by Ashley Bryan, published by Atheneum Books for Young Readers in 2016. It is set in a slave-owning state in 1828 and describes the hopes and dreams of eleven slaves listed for sale. It was named a Newbery Honor book in 2017.

== Plot summary ==
The story starts with a poem recounting the thoughts of the slaveowner, Mrs. Mary Fairchilds; after her husband, Cado died, she has decided to have her property appraised to prepare it for sale; afterward, she intends to return to England. The book gives the names and appraised value of each of the 11 slaves owned by the Fairchilds, accompanied by two poems: one describing their work and another describing their dreams.

Slave	Age	Value	Position	Name	Origin
Peggy	48	150	Cook	Mariama	
Stephen	32	300	Carpenter	Yerodin	Central Africa
Jane	28	300	Seamstress	Serwaa	West Africa
John	16	100	Child	Osere	America
Athelia	42	175	Laundress	Adero	
Charlotte	30	400	Basketmaker	Bisa	
Dora	8	400	Child	Akua	America
Bacus	34	250	Blacksmith	Abena	
Qush	60	100	Herdsman/Laborer	Kayode	Yoruba
Mulvina	60	100	Field	Niami	
Betty	36	150	Flower gardener	Temitope	Yoruba

== Development ==
The book was inspired by an actual appraisal dated July 5, 1828 in the author's collection; the appraisal listed names and values, but not ages. The title is taken from the spiritual Oh, Freedom.

== Reception ==
In 2017, the American Library Association named Freedom Over Me to its list of Newbery Honor winners, alongside Adam Gidwitz's The Inquisitor's Tale and Lauren Wolk's Wolf Hollow.
