= Carl Gustaf Nelson =

American artist (1898–1988)

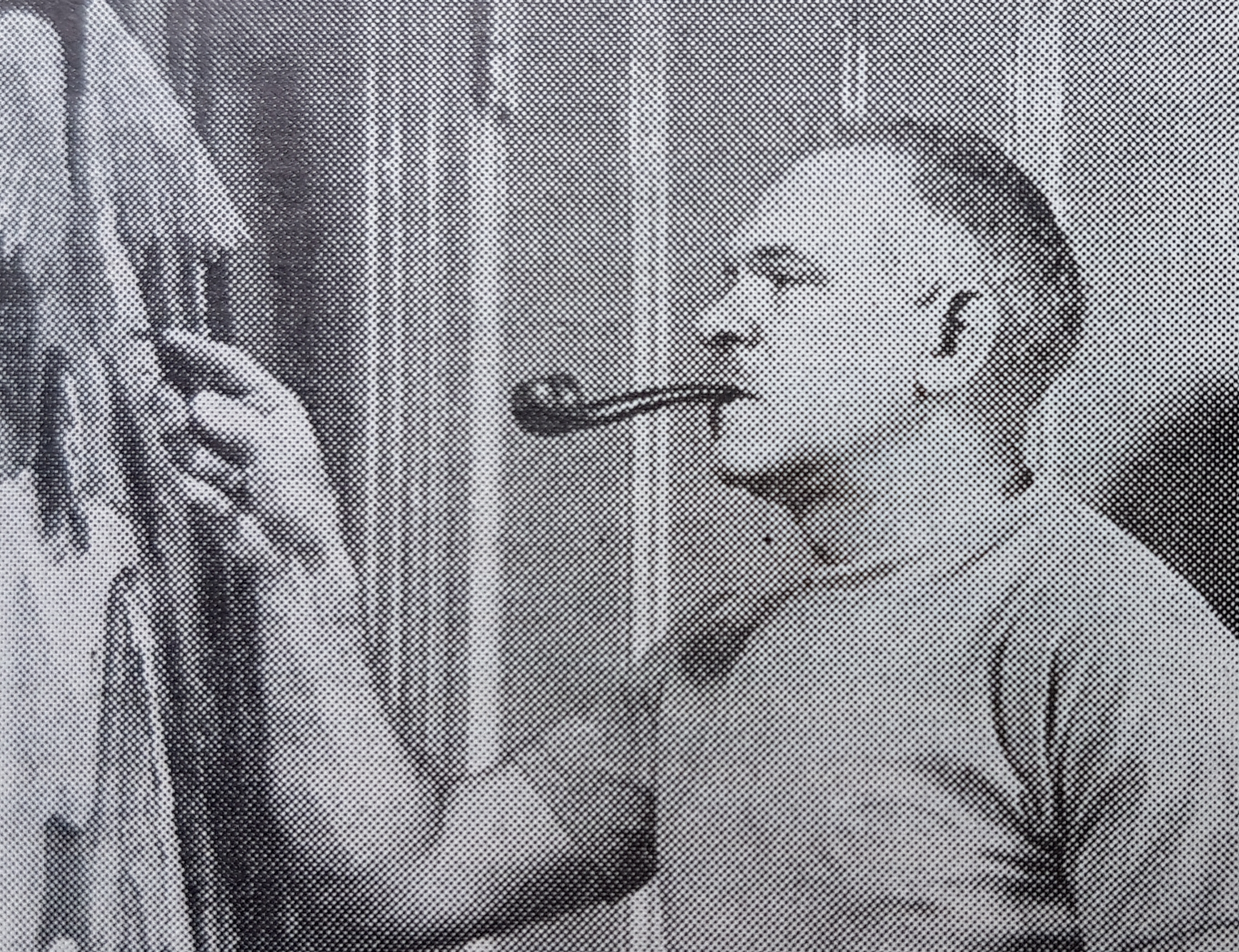
- Born: January 5, 1898; Hörby, Sweden
- Died: August 6, 1988 (aged 90); Illinois

Carl Gustaf Nelson (January 5, 1898–August 6, 1988) was an American artist.

== Life and career ==
Nelson was born in Hörby, Sweden, and immigrated to Sioux City, Iowa with his family around 1903. He studied at the Chicago Academy of Fine Arts, with Kimon Nicolaïdes at the New York Art Students' League, and with the Tiffany Foundation for Artists in New York City.

His most productive period was from the 1930s to the 1970s, during which "he exhibited at three Whitney Museum invitationals, twice at the Chicago Art Institute, and four times at the Carnegie International Exhibitions." He had one-man shows at Macbeth Gallery in New York, the Fitchburg Museum, Cambridge Art Association, Georgia Technical Institute, MIT Faculty Club, and the Cambridge School of Design. He worked as an art teacher at several institutions including Cambridge School of Design and American People's School of New York City.

He painted Central Park in 1934 for the Public Works of Art Project. He moved to the Cranberry Isles off the coast of Maine around 1951. In 1969 he was the subject of the short film Endless Wonder. His late career work included Maine landscapes, such as "scenes of birch trees and other natural features." He painted until he went blind in 1985. He worked in pen and ink, oil paint, and casein paint. He died at a nephew's home in Illinois in 1988.

== In popular culture ==
A photograph of Carl Nelson taken by Lois Lowry appears on the cover of some editions of The Giver.
