= Wolf Hollow (novel) =

2016 young adult novel by Lauren Wolk

- Author: Lauren Wolk
- Cover artist: Design: Irene Vandervoort; Lettering: Sarah J. Coleman; Silhouette and watercolor: Tony Sahara (based on photographs in author's collection)
- Language: English
- Set in: Rural western Pennsylvania, United States, Autumn 1943
- Publisher: Dutton Children's Books
- Publication date: May 3, 2016
- Pages: 304
- Awards: 2017 Newbery Honor
- ISBN: 9781101994849
- Website: Publisher's website

Wolf Hollow is a young adult novel written by Lauren Wolk, published by Dutton Children's Books in 2016. It is set in rural western Pennsylvania during the autumn of 1943 and describes how the protagonist, Annabelle "learned how to lie" and "that what I said and what I did mattered" in relation to two interlopers in her life: the bully Betty Glengarry, and the mysterious drifter Toby. It was named a Newbery Honor book in 2016.

== Plot summary ==
It is 1943. Eleven-year-old Annabelle Mcbride lives with her parents, grandparents, Aunt Lily, and two little brothers in the small town of Wolf Hollow, Pennsylvania. A quiet World War I veteran named Toby lives in an abandoned smokehouse nearby. Annabelle's mother is sympathetic to the man, who always carries three guns and seems troubled but harmless. Sometimes Mother leaves food for him. She even loans him a camera she won in a contest because he seems so interested in photography. Annabelle and Toby cross paths but have little interaction with one another.

One day, a 14-year-old bully named Betty Glengarry moves to Wolf Hollow to stay with her grandparents. Betty's meanness is evident to all the kids, but she singles out Annabelle because she thinks Annabelle is wealthy. Betty waits on the path where Annabelle walks home. She threatens to hurt Annabelle and her brothers if Annabelle won’t bring her an item of value.

Annabelle is nervous about Betty, but she decides to fight this battle without telling her parents. Annabelle doesn’t bring anything for Betty, so the bully continues to harass her. One day, she beats Annabelle with a stick. Another time, Betty breaks a bird's neck right in front of Annabelle, just to get a reaction.

Toby appears and tells Betty to leave Annabelle alone. Betty falls into a patch of poison ivy and suffers for days. Annabelle and her mother boil roots and take medicine to the Glengarry, but Betty is clearly still angry with Annabelle.

After Betty heals and returns to school, she starts spending time with a boy named Andy. The two frequently leave together, even during the school day. One day during a break from class, Annabelle chats with Mr. Ansel when he drives by with his cart. Her friend Ruth is standing nearby. From the hill above, which is obscured by trees and brush, someone throws a rock. It hits Ruth in the eye, which results in permanent blindness. People later speculate the rock was meant for Mr. Ansel because of his German heritage.

Annabelle tells her father what little she saw, and he tries to determine who might have thrown the rock. Betty blames Toby, but Betty herself seems like the prime suspect the more Annabelle investigates. She further mistrusts Betty when Annabelle and her brothers find a sharp wire strung across the path they take home from school.

Annabelle finally tells her parents about Betty's bullying. They take Annabelle to the Glengarrys so they can all talk to the grandparents. Betty denies everything Annabelle says and accuses Toby again.

Annabelle knows the police intend to question Toby. She goes to his smokehouse and tells him he needs to come with her right away. She hides him in the loft of her family's barn, and she brings him a book and some coffee. She even cuts his hair and beard until he is unrecognizable.

Toby opens up to Annabelle about the horrors he's seen in war. He also tells her about a photograph he took the day Ruth was hit by a rock. Toby saw Betty throw it, but he hadn't quite managed to catch the crime on camera.

Betty goes missing, and the search for Toby intensifies. Annabelle knows Toby has been in the barn and couldn’t have taken Betty. Annabelle finally realizes Betty may have fallen into an old ground well near Toby's smokehouse. She leads police and searchers to the well. She also urges Toby, who looks like a stranger, to show up and rescue Betty.

Toby volunteers to go into the well, where he finds a badly injured Betty and pulls her out. She has been hanging suspended in the cold for several days and ultimately doesn't survive. Even to her death, she blames Toby for the ways she has hurt others.

Annabelle's mother recognizes the stranger as Toby. She and Annabelle's father try to help him, but the police are closing in to capture him. Toby finally decides the only way to keep Annabelle and her family safe is to flee. He later dies at the hands of law enforcement officers who were tracking him. Annabelle's parents pay for Toby's funeral and burial.

== Development ==
Wolk's family farm inspired the setting for Wolf Hollow; her mother and two uncles lived on the farm and walked to school. In addition, Wolk stated she was inspired by contemporary events, as she "hoped to create through Betty a microcosm of what was happening in the war. A ferocious bully and his sidekicks were murdering and terrorizing the world. Bringing out the worst in people, and sometimes the best. And Betty was doing the same on a much smaller scale in Wolf Hollow."

== Reception ==
In 2017, the American Library Association named Wolf Hollow to its list of Newbery Honor winners, alongside Ashley Bryan's Freedom Over Me and Adam Gidwitz's The Inquisitor's Tale.
