= Penikese Island Leper Hospital =

Leprosy hospital off the Massachusetts coast

Geography
- Location: Penikese Island, Gosnold, Massachusetts, United States
- Coordinates: 41°27′4″N 70°55′29″W

History
- Opened: 1905
- Closed: 1921

Links
- Lists: Hospitals in Massachusetts

The Penikese Island Leper Hospital was a leprosy hospital located on Penikese Island, off the coast of Massachusetts, United States, from 1905 to 1921. It housed a small colony of people who suffered from leprosy over the years until it was closed in 1921 and patients were relocated to a federal hospital in Louisiana.
