= Baker Island Light =

Lighthouse in Maine, US

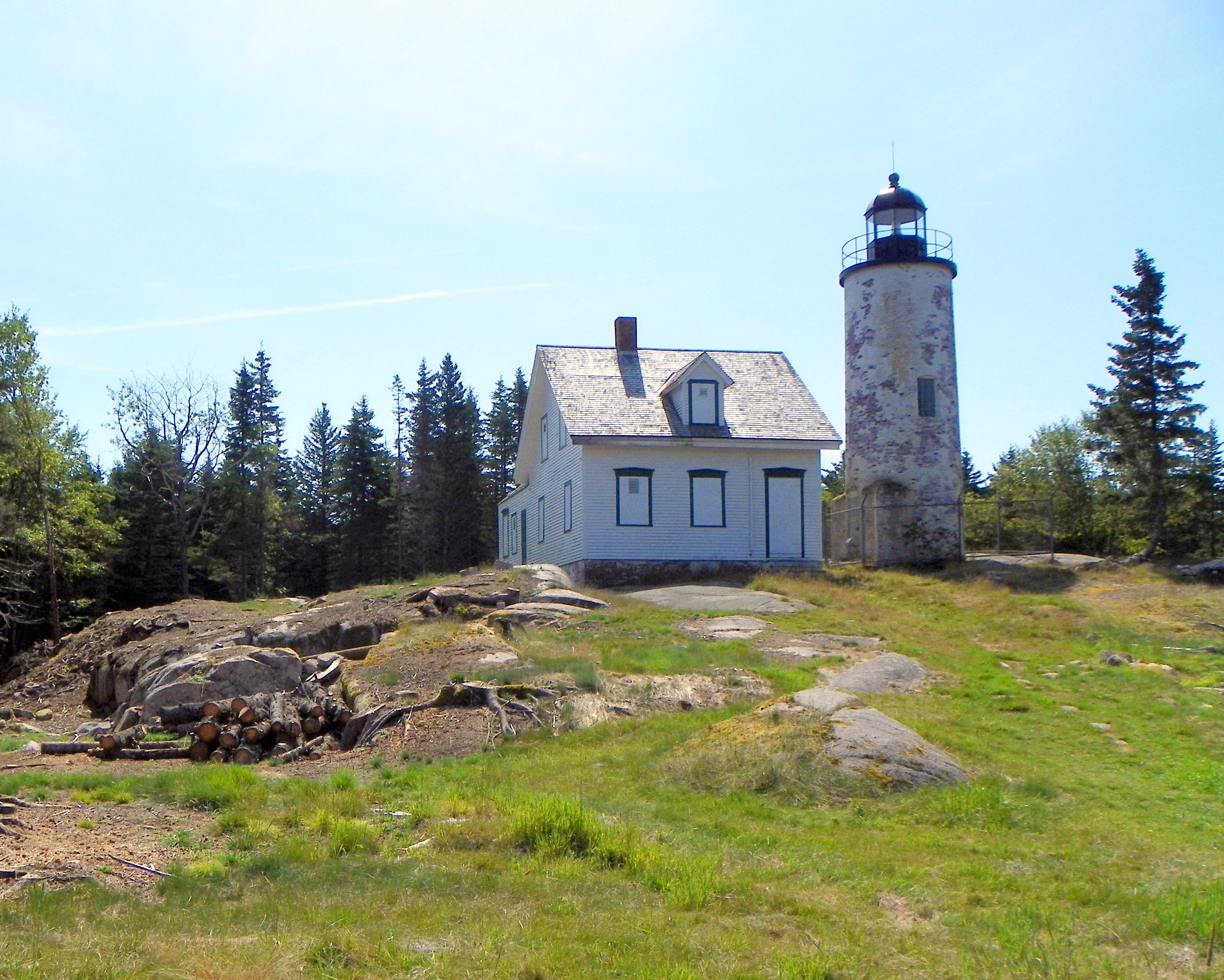
- Baker Island Light and Lightkeeper's House
- Location: Baker Island, Maine
- Coordinates: 44°14′28.351″N 68°11′56.442″W

Tower
- Constructed: 1828
- Construction: brick (tower)
- Automated: 1966
- Height: 13 m (43 ft)
- Shape: Cylindrical
- Markings: White
- Heritage: National Register of Historic Places listed place
- Fog signal: none

Light
- First lit: 1855 (current structure)
- Focal height: 105 feet (32 m)
- Range: 10 nautical miles (19 km; 12 mi)
- Characteristic: Fl W 10s
- Baker Island Light Station
- U.S. National Register of Historic Places
- U.S. Historic district
- Area: 10 acres (4.0 ha)
- Built: 1855
- Architect: US Army Corps of Engineers
- MPS: Light Stations of Maine MPS
- NRHP reference No.: 88000046
- Added to NRHP: March 14, 1988

Baker Island Light is a lighthouse on Baker Island, Maine, which is part of Acadia National Park. The light station was established in 1828 as a guide to the southern entrance to Frenchman Bay. The present tower was built in 1855; the well-preserved tower, keeper's house, and associated outbuildings were listed on the National Register of Historic Places in 1988.

== Description ==
The present light station includes four buildings: the tower, keeper's house, oil house, and fuel house. The tower and keeper's house were both built in 1855, the oil house is a small brick structure built in 1895, and the fuel house is a small wood-frame structure built in 1905. The keeper's house and tower were originally connected by a covered way. The tower stands at the high point of Baker Island, about 70 feet (21 m) above sea level. The focal plane of its lens is 37 feet (11 m) above its base. The brick tower had two windows in the stairwell, but these have been bricked over. The brick tower has an octagonal iron lantern house with a surrounding railing and walkway mounted on it, which is topped by a polygonal dome. When built, the station was given a fourth-order Fresnel lens.

The keeper's house is a small L-shaped wood-frame building, with a gable roof and a brick foundation. Now finished in clapboards, it was originally clad in board-and-batten siding. There was originally a covered passage from the house's east end covering the short distance to the tower, but this has been removed.

== History ==
The Baker Island station was established in 1828, and was the first along Maine's coast located in the general vicinity of Mount Desert Island. The light is an aid to navigation for reaching that island's major ports, including Bar Harbor and Northeast Harbor. The buildings of the station are now owned and administered by Acadia National Park; the light itself is maintained by the United States Coast Guard.

== See also ==
- National Register of Historic Places listings in Hancock County, Maine
- National Register of Historic Places listings in Acadia National Park
