= Bear Island Light =

Lighthouse in Maine, United States

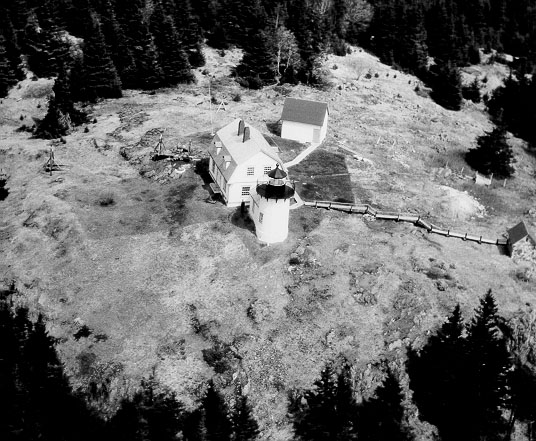
- circa 1972
- Location: Bear Island (Maine)
- Coordinates: 44°17′.6″N 68°16′11.6″W

Tower
- Constructed: 1839
- Construction: brick
- Automated: 1989
- Height: 31 feet (9.4 m)
- Shape: Cylindrical attached to Work Room and Dwelling
- Markings: White
- Heritage: National Register of Historic Places listed place
- Fog signal: Original: Bell; Current: None

Light
- First lit: 1889 (current structure)
- Deactivated: 1981-1989
- Focal height: 100 feet (30 m)
- Lens: Original: 5th order Fresnel; Current: Plastic
- Range: 10 nautical miles (19 km; 12 mi)
- Characteristic: Fl W 5s
- Bear Island Light Station
- U.S. National Register of Historic Places
- U.S. Historic district
- Nearest city: Northeast Harbor, Maine
- Built: 1889
- Architect: US Army Corps of Engineers
- MPS: Light Stations of Maine MPS
- NRHP reference No.: 88000043
- Added to NRHP: March 14, 1988

Bear Island Light is a lighthouse on Bear Island near Mt. Desert Island, at the entrance to Northeast Harbor, Maine. It was first established in 1839. The present structure was built in 1889. It was deactivated in 1981 and relit as a private aid to navigation by the Friends of Acadia National Park in 1989. Bear Island Light was listed on the National Register of Historic Places as Bear Island Light Station on March 14, 1988.

== Description and history ==
Bear Island Light was authorized by federal legislation signed by President Martin Van Buren in 1838. The government acquired 2 acres (0.81 ha) of land at the southwestern end of Bear Island, and in 1839 constructed a stone keeper's house, on top of which a light was mounted. This structure burned in 1852, and was replaced the following year by a brick tower. A fifth order Fresnel lens was installed in the tower in 1855, and a fog station was added in 1888. In 1889 the 1852 tower was torn down and most of the present complex of buildings was constructed. The Coast Guard discontinued the light in the 1980s, replacing it with an offshore buoy with a bell and light. The Bear Island property became part of Acadia National Park in 1987. The station was restored in 1989 by the Friends of Acadia, and relit as a private aid to navigation.

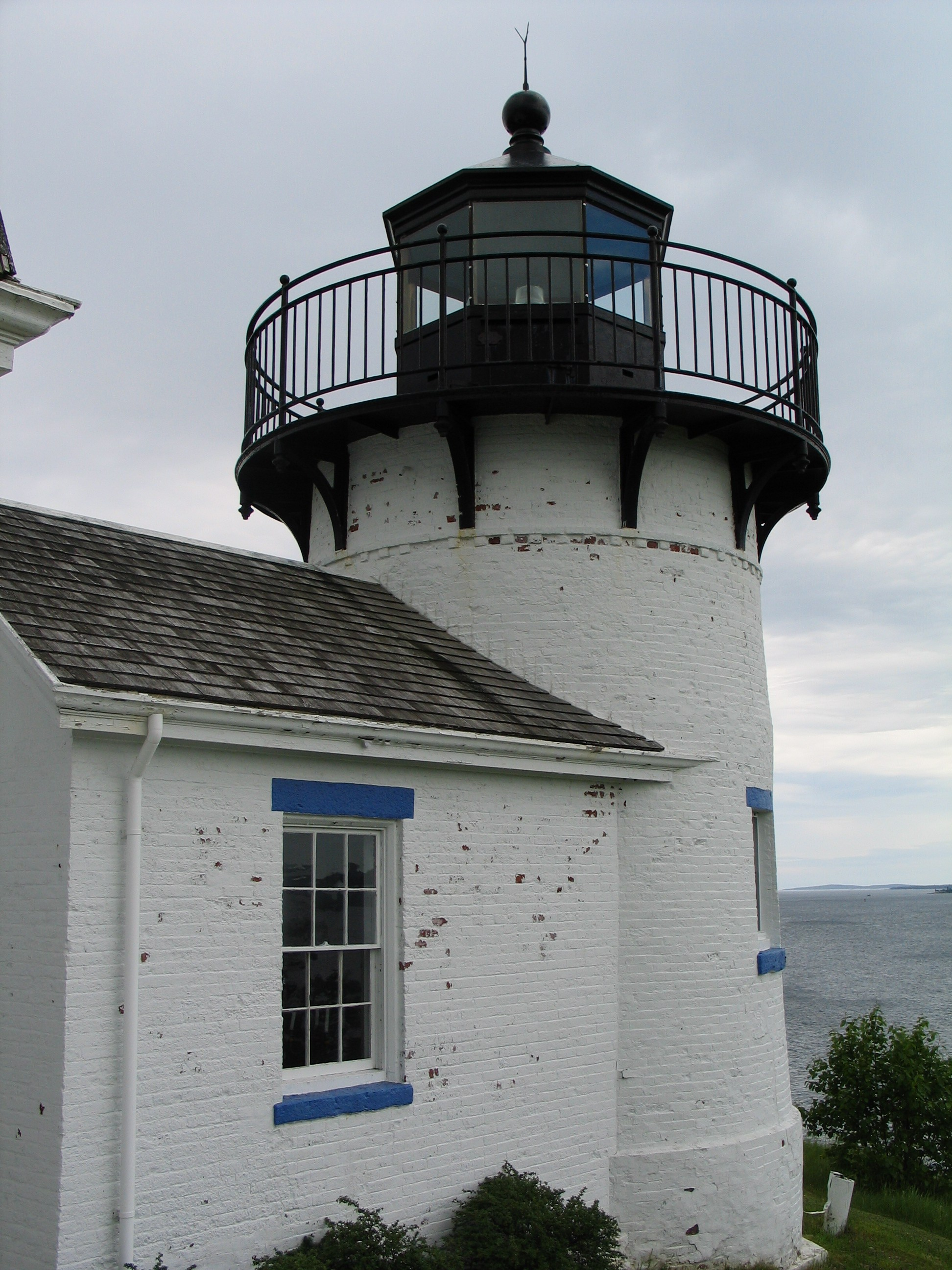
Bear Island Light

The tower is a cylindrical brick structure, 31 feet (9.4 m) in height, with an attached gable-roofed workroom, and was built in 1889. It is topped by a polygonal lantern chamber, with a surrounding iron parapet and railing. There are two narrow windows in the tower, and two into the workroom, which also has the entrance providing access to the tower. The keeper's house is a modest 1 1/2-story wood-frame structure, with a gambrel roof pierced by gable-roof dormers.

The light station includes three outbuildings. The largest is a gable-roofed barn, set at a remove from the keeper's house and tower. Just to the barn's southwest is a small stone oil house, built in 1905. To the northwest of the tower is the station's boathouse and slip. The boathouse is a frame structure with a gable roof and shingled sides, and was also built in 1905.

== See also ==
- National Register of Historic Places listings in Hancock County, Maine
- National Register of Historic Places listings in Acadia National Park
