= Gary Allen (runner) =

American long-distance runner, race director and entrepreneur

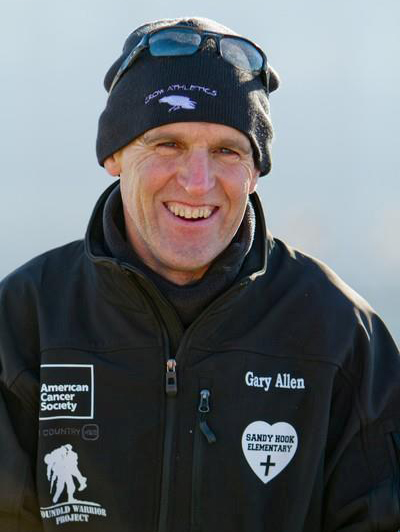
- Born: 1957 (age 68–69); Atwater, California, US
- Occupations: Founder & director, Mount Desert Island Marathon (2002-present); Co-founder & director, Great Cranberry Island 50K Ultra Marathon (2007-13); Founder & director, Millinocket Marathon (2015-present)
- Years active: 1972–present
- Children: 2
- Website: Official website

Gary Allen (born 1957) is an American long-distance runner, race director and entrepreneur. He is the founder and director of the Mount Desert Island Marathon, the Millinocket Marathon & Half and the co-founder of the Downeast Sunrise Trail Relay and the Great Cranberry Island 50K Ultra Marathon.

== Early life and education ==
Allen was born in Atwater, California, and raised on Great Cranberry Island, a small, two-mile long island off the coast of Maine with a year-round population of under 40. A twelfth generation native of the island, his ancestors first settled there in the 1650s. He started running when he was 13, and was inspired to seriously pursue the sport after watching Frank Shorter win the marathon gold medal at the 1972 Munich Olympics.

== Career ==
=== As runner ===
Allen's first sub-3-hour marathon was at the Paul Bunyan Marathon in Bangor, Maine, on July 15, 1978, with a time of 2:52:41. He achieved his personal best time of 2:39:30 in 1984. In 2003, Allen broke the US Track and Field American masters long distance track running record for men ages 45–49, completing 20 miles in 2:08:41, besting the previous record of 2:09:14, set by Ted Corbitt in 1966.

In 2004, Allen began an annual tradition of running the route of the Boston Marathon on New Year's Day. In 2012, in honor of the Bangor Labor Day Road Race's 50th anniversary, Allen arrived prior to the race and ran the five-mile loop nine times before running the actual race, for a total of 50 miles, one for each year of the event's history. When the 2012 New York City Marathon was canceled due to Superstorm Sandy, Allen went to the site and ran the course anyway.

Allen has completed several "journey runs". In the winter of 2013, he ran from atop Cadillac Mountain in Acadia National Park in Maine to Washington, DC, for President Barack Obama's second inauguration. He left on January 7, 2013, and completed the 705-mile run on January 21, reaching the Capitol that evening after averaging 50 miles per day. The run raised $20,000 for the American Cancer Society, Wounded Warrior Project and Sandy Hook Elementary School in Connecticut. In 2014, Allen completed a 500-mile run from Maine to Super Bowl XLVIII at MetLife Stadium in New Jersey to benefit the Wounded Warrior Project, raising $20,000. The run started on January 24, 2014, and concluded on February 2, for an average of 50 miles per day.

Allen is a regular attendee at Burning Man.

According to the Association of Road Racing Statisticians, in 2010 Allen became one of 20 runners to have run a sub-3-hour marathon in each of the past five decades. He ran a 2:52 at the 1978 Paul Bunyan Marathon and a 2:51 at the Snickers Marathon in Albany, Georgia, in 2010. When he ran a sub-3 hour marathon at the Tacoma City Marathon in Washington in May 2012, it increased the span between his first and most recent sub 3-hour marathon to 33 years and 289 days, the eighth-longest split of its kind in the US, according to the Association of Road Racing Statisticians. As of March 2016, Allen is one of 34 people in the world to have run a marathon in under 3 hours in each of the past five decades. When Allen ran the Boston Marathon in April 2016, it was the 100th marathon of his life, and the 24th time he has completed the Boston Marathon. He has completed the New York City Marathon 17 times. Through 2015, he has run more than 110,000 miles lifetime, and finished 68 sub-3 hour marathons in five decades.

=== As race director ===
From 1978 to 2004, Allen and his older brother Larry organized a 5K run, which had 350 participants at its peak. Winner prizes included paintings donated by local artists, and autographed shoes of world-class runners like Joan Benoit Samuelson and Marty Liquori. Allen founded the annual Mount Desert Island Marathon in 2002. It was named race of the year by New England Runner magazine in 2015. In 2007, he co-founded the Great Cranberry Island 50K Ultra Marathon, a 50-kilometer race that involves running back and forth on Great Cranberry Island's two-mile-long main road, the lone road on the island. The race took place annually until 2013, growing from 13 runners its first year to 192 runners by 2013. In 2013, the race was the official Road Runners Club of America national championship for 50 kilometers. It was named the 2013 Road Runners Club of America Road Race of the Year.

Allen is the co-founder of Crow Athletics running club. He also organizes the annual Millinocket Marathon, a free race in Millinocket, Maine, that debuted in December 2015 to support local businesses and help the community's economy after the closing of the Great Northern Paper Company mill, which was once the largest paper mill in the world.

Allen was named the Race Director of the Year in 2018 by Road Race Management.

Runner's World magazine has called Allen "one of running's most creative minds and race directors."

In October 2023 the Mount Desert Island Marathon celebrated its twentieth running and was able to contribute $35,000.00 to local charities. According to a study from the Maine Sports Commission, the event is estimated to have brought a record $2,184,632 to the local economy in 2023. The Millinocket Marathon, held in December of the same year, was able to contribute $15,271.20 in support of local charity and community groups in the Katahdin region. Additionally, between $2 and 3 million were spent at local Millinocket businesses over race weekend.

== Personal life ==
In 2017 Allen was a recipient of WLBZ’s, 2 Those Who Care Awards for his personal and professional community service achievements.

Allen is a father of two and a 12th generation Great Cranberry Islander.

Allen was featured in the New York Times regarding a running event to be held in the Katahdin region of Maine that coincides with a total eclipse viewable in parts of the world on 8 April 2024.
