= Fernald Point Prehistoric Site =

- U.S. National Register of Historic Places
- Location within Maine Location within the United States
- Nearest city: Southwest Harbor, Maine
- Coordinates: 44°17′53″N 68°18′35″W
- Area: 1 acre (0.40 ha)
- NRHP reference No.: 78000164
- Added to NRHP: July 21, 1978

The Fernald Point Prehistoric Site is an archaeological site in Acadia National Park on Mount Desert Island on the central coast of Maine. The principal feature of the site is a shell midden, whose excavation has yielded both historic artifacts and evidence of human occupation to at least 1000 BCE. The site was listed on the National Register of Historic Places in 1978.

== Description ==
Fernald Point is located in the town of Southwest Harbor, Maine, on the western shore of Somes Sound, the body of water that divides Mount Desert Island into two large lobes. The point marks the western side of The Narrows, a narrow point near the southernmost end of the sound. The site is on land now owned by the National Park Service as part of Acadia National Park.

The principal investigation of the site took place in 1977 under the auspices of Dr. David Sanger, an archaeologist from the University of Maine at Orono. Sanger describes this work as at least a partial salvage operation, as the site was being eroded due a long-term rise in sealevels in the area since the end of the last Ice Age; the site has since been protected by construction of a seawall. Major finds at the site including elements of at least two house sites (one of which was already significantly eroded), and eight human burials. One group of four graves was clearly placed with deliberation in the midden, a practice that is otherwise rare on the Maine coast.

Finds at the site suggest that it was occupied as early as 1000 BCE, although older radiocarbon dates (to 2000 BCE) were obtained. The period of heaviest occupation was between 1 CE and 1300 CE. In addition to large quantities of shells (mostly of soft-shell clams), the midden yielded up evidence of human consumption of a wide variety of mammals, birds and fish. Evidence of clay pottery is limited to fragmentary potsherds, although there were sufficient examples to trace changes in decoration and style.

== See also ==
- National Register of Historic Places listings in Hancock County, Maine
- National Register of Historic Places listings in Acadia National Park
