= Great Cranberry Island =

Island in Hancock County, Maine, United States

Coordinates: 44°14′37″N 68°15′33.5″W

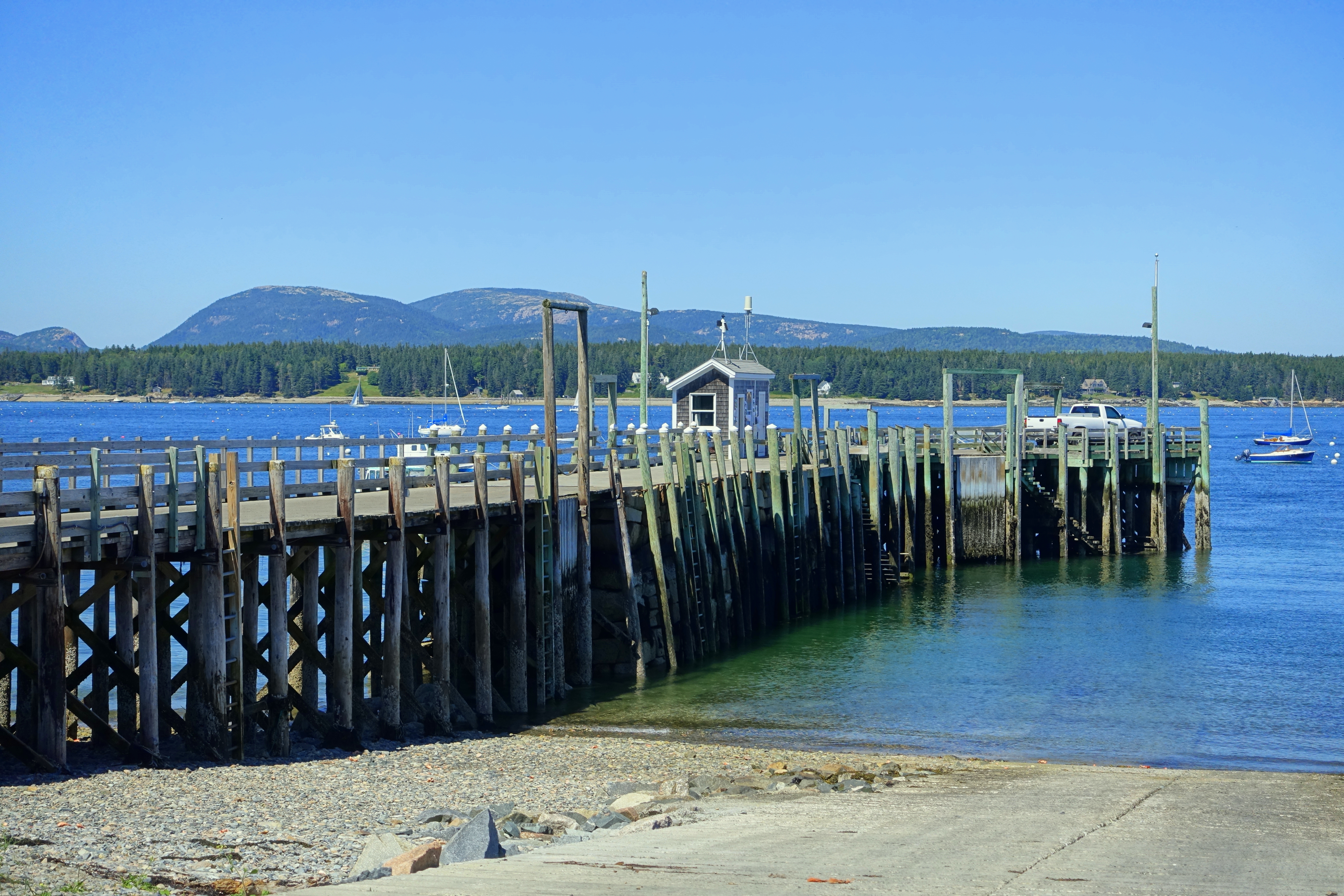
The Town Dock on Great Cranberry Island

Great Cranberry Island is an island located in Maine, United States. It is the largest of the five islands of the Town of Cranberry Isles. It is roughly two miles (3.2 kilometres) long and one mile (1.6 kilometres) wide.

Access to the island is provided by ferry from either Northeast Harbor or Southwest Harbor, both located on Mount Desert Island. Many islanders also have their own boats and dock at Spurling Cove.

The population of the island is over 300 in the summertime, but the year-round population is only around 40. The year-round population is mostly fishermen who fish the shores for the ever-popular seafood, lobster.

Notable locations on the island are the History Museum, which includes a public trail to the shore, the General Store, the school and library, Post Office, Whale's Rib Gift Shop and Crow Island, the last of which is accessible only at low tide.

The Ladies' Aid Fair, held each year since 1900 in August, is a highlight of the annual calendar.

The island was home to artist Wini Smart, who painted hundreds of oil and watercolor paintings around Great Cranberry Island and the surrounding Mount Desert Island area; as well as Charles Wadsworth, an artist, poet, and illustrator whose work is held in the collections of several regional and national museums.

Great Cranberry Island is the setting of the fictional children's book My Kindergarten by Rosemary Wells.

The island is also featured in a Fallout 4 expansion pack, Far Harbor.

Great Cranberry Island was also home to the GCI 50K Ultra Marathon and The Great Run put on by Crow Athletics and long-distance runner Gary Allen.

== The Heath ==
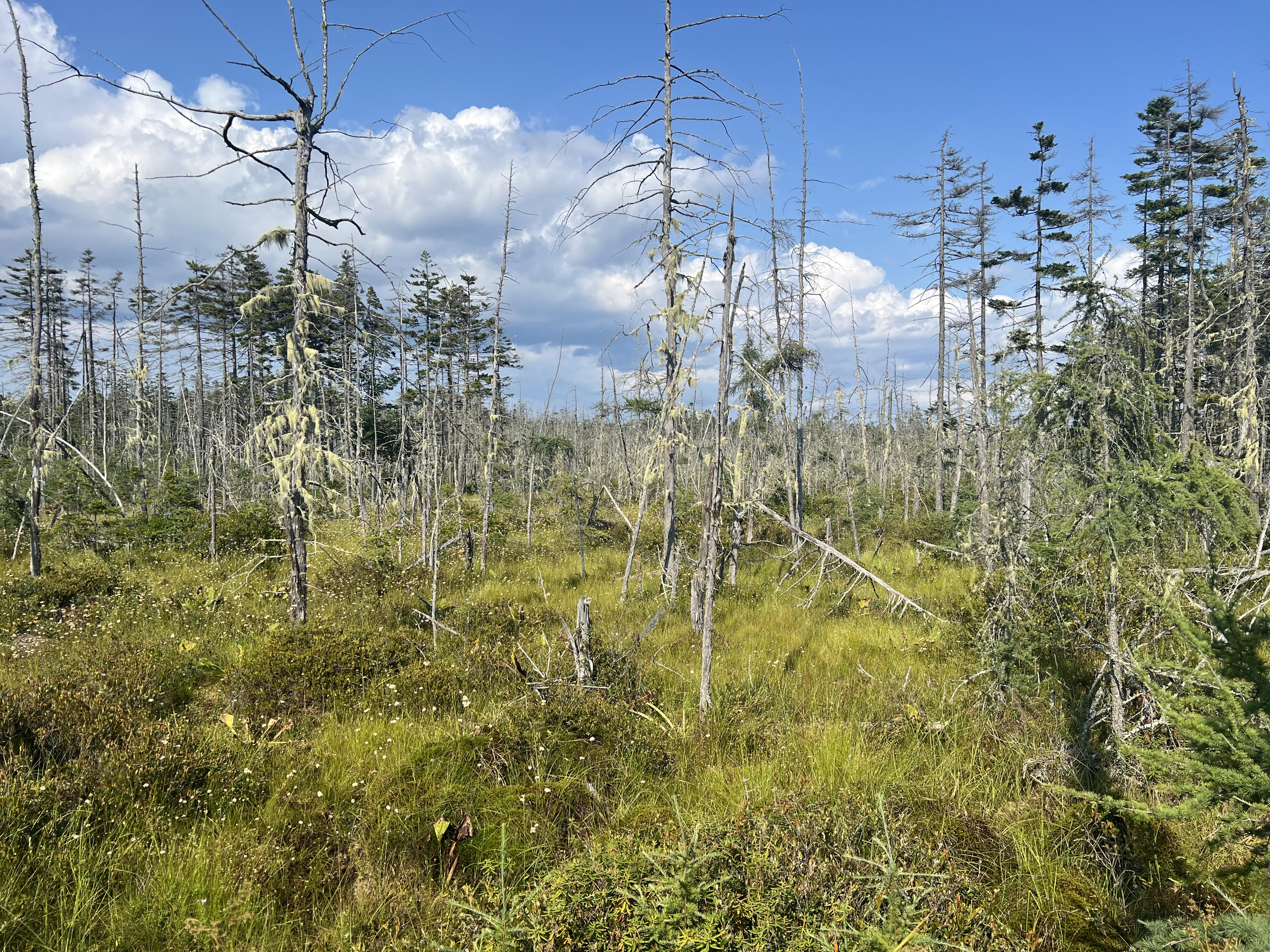
The Heath, captured from McSorley Rd, also known as I-95

The Heath is a named peatland situated on the south-west corner of Great Cranberry Island and it is considered to offer an exceptional opportunity for studying the intricate relationships between various peat types. The peat deposits in The Heath exhibit remarkable variability, both laterally and vertically. Swamp/marsh-deposited peat is found along the margins of The Heath, as well as underneath the Sphagnum moss-dominated peat within the raised bog. Additionally, a third peat type, dominated by herbaceous aquatics, can be observed beneath the swamp/marsh-dominated peat, although it does not represent the dominant botanical community within The Heath.
