= Baker Island (Maine) =

Island in Hancock County, Maine, United States

Coordinates: 44°14′29.3″N 68°11′54.6″W

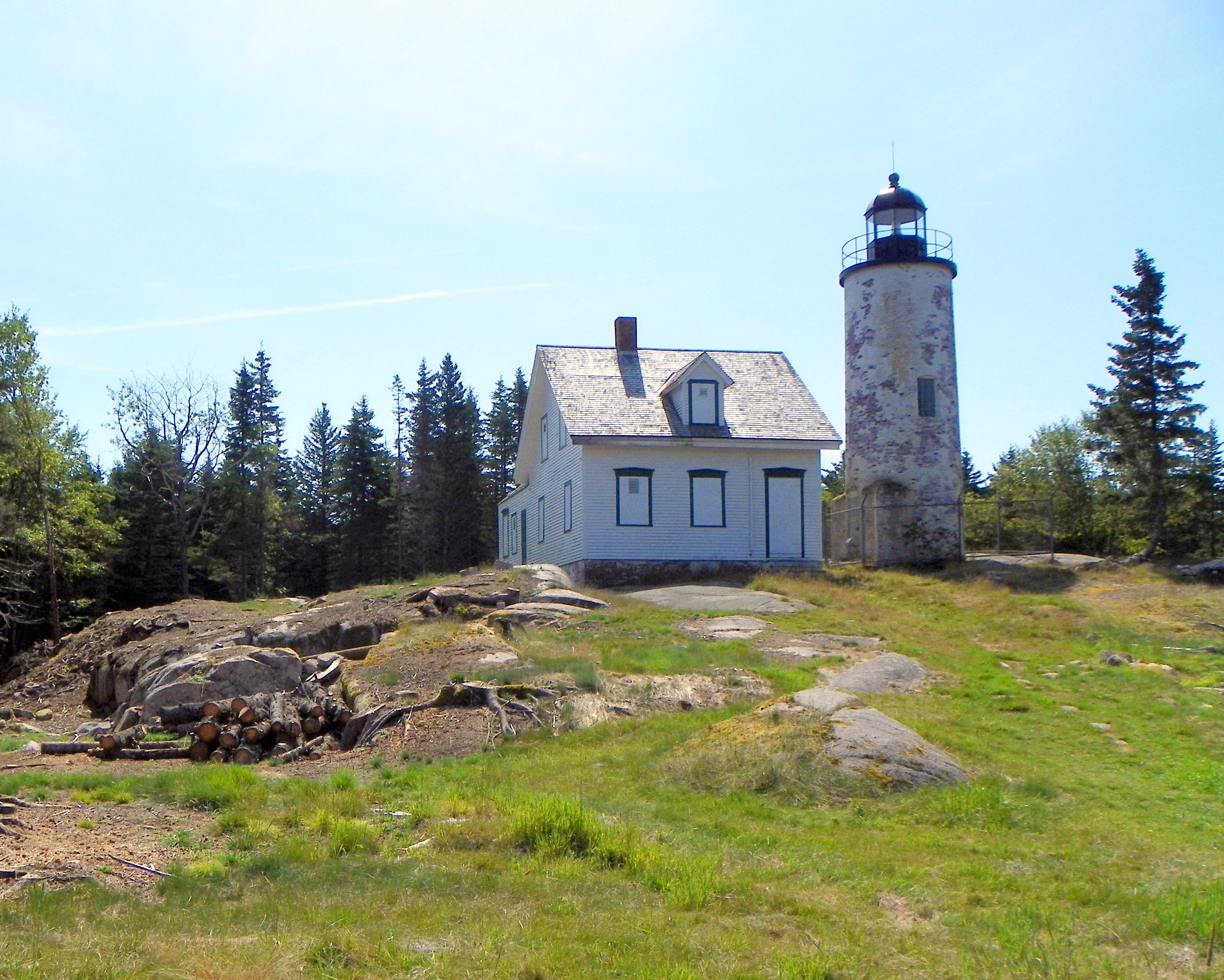
The Baker Island Light Station

Baker Island is an island located in Maine, United States. It marks the southwestern entrance to Frenchman Bay, about four miles (2.5 km) south of Mt. Desert Island. It is one of the five islands in the town of Cranberry Isles.

The island is not inhabited year round. There are only three property owners on the island: two are private residence owners, with the rest of the island (over 75% of the total land) belonging to the National Park Service.

Baker Island Light sits in the center of the island. The station began in 1828 on the order of John Quincy Adams, to warn of the shoals around the Cranberry Isles and the sand bar running between Baker Island and Little Cranberry Island. The current tower was built in 1855 and automated in 1966. The lighthouse is a historic site listed in the National Register of Historic Places.
