= Bear Island (Maine) =

Island in Hancock County, Maine, United States

Coordinates: 44°17′2.1″N 68°16′6.9″W

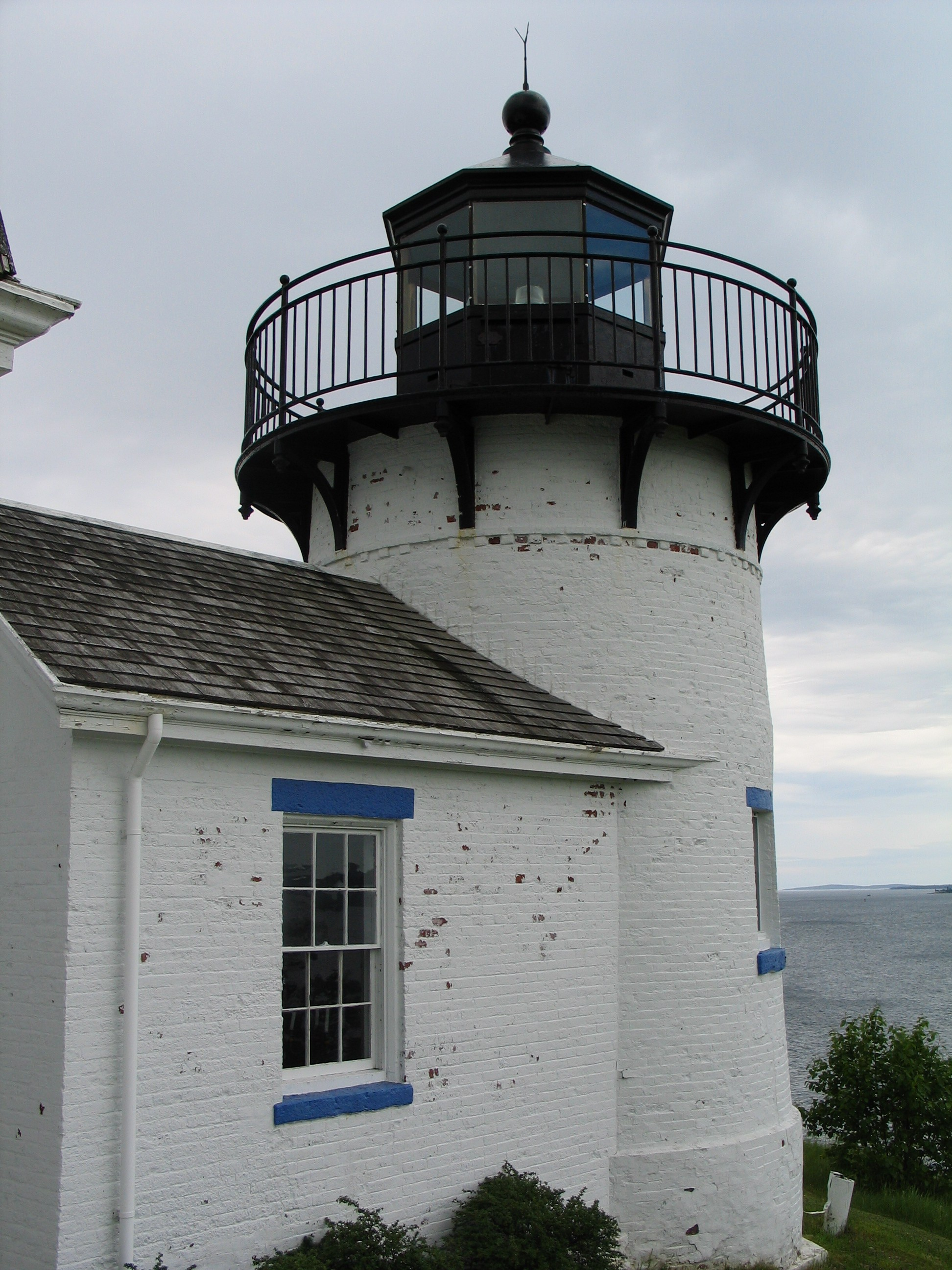
Bear Island Light Station tower in Acadia National Park, Maine, USA. 2007

Bear Island is an 11-acre (4.5 ha) island in Maine, United States. It is one of the five islands of the Town of Cranberry Isles. The island is located just off Northeast Harbor and south of Mount Desert Island.

Bear Island Light, on the western end of the island, was built in 1889 and staffed until 1981. The rest of the island is owned by the Dunbar family, having been bought by Harvard professor Charles F. Dunbar in 1886.
