= Beyond the Bright Sea =

2017 historical fiction by Lauren Wolk

- First edition
- Author: Lauren Wolk
- Language: English
- Genre: Adventure fiction Historical fiction
- Publisher: Dutton Books for Young Readers
- Publication date: May 2, 2017
- Publication place: USA
- Media type: Print (Paperback)
- Pages: 320
- ISBN: 9781101994870
- OCLC: 1003998426

Beyond the Bright Sea is a 2017 children's historical adventure fiction written by the American author Lauren Wolk. It was published by Dutton Books for Young Readers on May 2, 2017

== Plot ==
Beyond the Bright Sea is about a twelve year-old girl named Crow who was found on Elizabeth Islands by Osh, who found her in a skiff on the island of Cuttyhunk. She is being raised by Osh and their neighbor Miss Maggie. As Crow grows up she finds out about her history and family starting with Penikese Island, an old leper colony.

== Awards and reception ==
- NPR Best Book of the Year 2017
- Parents Magazine Best Book of the Year 2018
- Booklist Editors’ Choice selection
- BookPage Best Book of the Year 2018
- Horn Book Fanfare Selection 2018
- Kirkus Best Book of the Year 2018
- School Library Journal Best Book of the Year 2018
- Charlotte Observer Best Book of the Year 2018
- Southern Living Best Book of the Year
- New York Public Library Best Book of the Year 2018
- Winner Scott O'Dell Award for Historical Fiction 2018
