= Paul Petrie =

American poet (1928–2012)

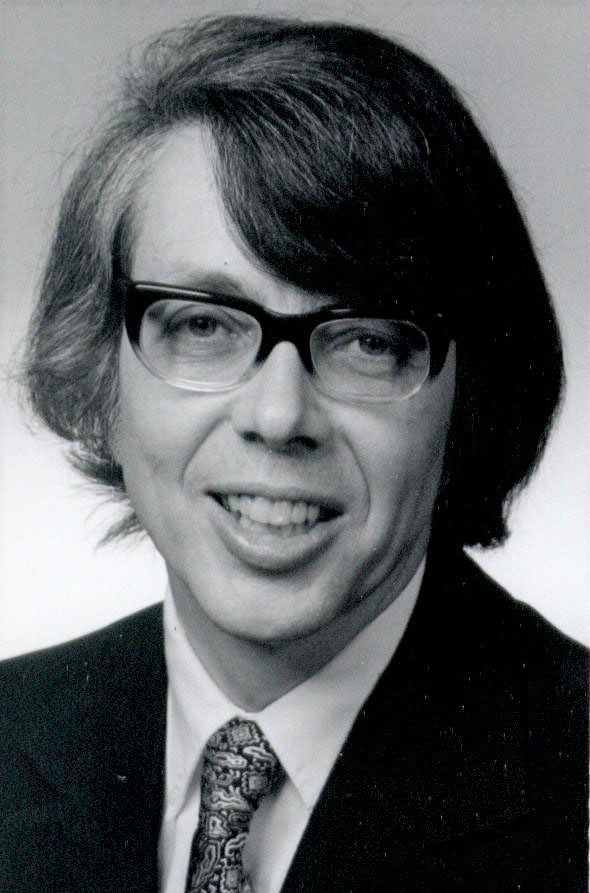
- Born: July 1, 1928; Detroit, Michigan
- Died: November 9, 2012 (aged 84); Providence, Rhode Island
- Education: Wayne State University in Detroit, MI (BA 1950, MA 1951); Iowa Writers Workshop in Iowa City, IA (PhD, 1957)
- Occupations: Poet, University Professor

Paul James Petrie (July 1, 1928 – November 9, 2012) was an American poet and professor emeritus of English and creative writing at the University of Rhode Island in Kingston, where he taught for over 30 years. His work has appeared in over 100 literary journals and magazines—including Poetry, The New Yorker, Atlantic Monthly, New York Times, The Nation, The New Republic, Sewanee Review, Paris Review, Massachusetts Review, The Michigan Quarterly Review - and has been reprinted in eight anthologies including The Treasury of American Poetry.

== Biography ==
Paul Petrie was born in 1928 in Detroit, Michigan, and grew up in what, at that time, was the outer fringes of the city, an area half rural and half suburban. From this fact may have arisen his abiding love of nature, while his interest in poetry was probably affected by his mother's Canadian grade school education (much memorization of poems) and her ability to recite whole swatches of Longfellow and Tennyson verbatim.

In 1946 he attended Wayne State University, where he was a member of the Miles Poetry Group, earning a BA and an MA in 1950 and 1951, and where he began to write poetry in earnest. While still finishing his thesis, he was drafted into the army and spent the next two years in the Service, the latter half in Alaska reading newspapers for Intelligence. Upon completion of his military service, he went to the University of Iowa where he enrolled in the Iowa Writers Workshop, studying with Robert Lowell, John Berryman and Paul Engle, and earning his doctorate in 1957 with a dissertation in Creative Writing. For one year he taught in Nebraska, and for 31 years at the University of Rhode Island, during which period he spent sabbatical leaves in Devon, England, as well as several months in Settignano and Amsterdam.

He was married to the artist Sylvia Spencer Petrie, a printmaker and former member of the 19 on Paper art group, who has also illustrated several of his books. They have three children, Philip, Emily and Lisa, and 5 grandchildren.

== Work ==
Petrie's work tends to be diverse, in form, technique, and subject matter. His poems, like the world they illuminate, are multifaceted and so are hard to sum up. If there is one theme that appears to be pervasive, it is mutability, the transience of everything, and the various ways we humans attempt to deal with it in our lives.

In some of his pieces he employs traditional forms and meters (though with considerable latitude), and in others he uses more open forms and freer rhythms, while still maintaining a voice uniquely his own. In general it is not inaccurate to say that he puts more stress on the musical elements of poetry than is currently common.

Above all, he dislikes dogmas, whether in theory, subject matter or technique, and uses whatever seems best suited to the matter at hand.

== Awards ==
- 1990 Wayne State University Arts Achievement Award
- 1984 Capricorn Award Winner for The Runners
- 1968 Phi Beta Kappa poet at Brown University

== Poetry collections ==
- The Collected Poems, Antrim House, 2014, ISBN 978-1-936482-60-3
- Rooms of Grace: New and Selected Poems, New Orleans Poetry Journal Press, 2005, ISBN 0-938498-10-X
- The Runners, Slow Loris Press, 1988, ISBN 0-918366-29-1 (Winner of the Capricorn Award for 1984)
- Strange Gravity, The Tidal Press, 1984, ISBN 978-0-930954-22-2
- Not Seeing Is Believing, Juniper Press, 1983
- Time Songs, Biscuit City Press, 1979
- Light from the Furnace Rising, Copper Beech Press, 1978, ISBN 978-0-914278-19-1
- The Academy of Goodbye, The University Press of New England, 1974, ISBN 0-87451-098-8
- From Under The Hill of Night, Vanderbilt University Press, 1969, ISBN 978-0-8265-1140-9
- The Leader, Hellcoal Press, 1968 (a tribute to Martin Luther King Jr.), a poem read at the 1968 Phi Beta Kappa dinner at Brown University, whose first section describes the June, 1963 Great March on Detroit in which the poet participated
- The Race With Time and the Devil, Golden Quill Press, 1965 (a selection of the Book Club for Poetry)
- Confessions of a Nonconformist, Hillside Press, 1963
