= George Daniell (photographer) =

George Daniell (1911–2002), was an American portrait photographer and artist.

George Daniell was born in Yonkers, New York.

Daniell's father killed himself in front of his family at the dinner table.

George went on to receive a bachelor's degree in painting and photography from Yale University.

Daniell worked for Time and Life magazines, and photographed Audrey Hepburn, Tennessee Williams, Lena Horne, Robert De Niro, and Georgia O'Keeffe.

He was gay, and in a forty-year relationship with the artist Stephen Dorland, until his death in 1983, after which his companion was Roy Oxley, 55 years younger than him. He died in 2002 from complications following a stroke.
