= Wini Smart =

American painter

Wini Smart (1932-2017) was a watercolorist and oil painter of marine and landscapes, many of them scenes of Maine, and her specialty was watercolors. She was also a muralist, bas-relief sculptor, and illustrator including "Early History of Toms River and Dover Township."

Smart was born on March 17, 1932, in Neptune, New Jersey. She studied at the Philadelphia Museum College of Art, the Fleisher Art Memorial in Philadelphia, and the Art Students League of New York. Smart maintained two galleries, one in Northeast Harbor, Maine, for 40 years; another in Boca Grande, Florida, since 1980. Smart married Fred Quackenbush in June 2009. Smart died on September 15, 2017.
