= Cranberry Isles, Maine =

Town in Maine, United States

- Town
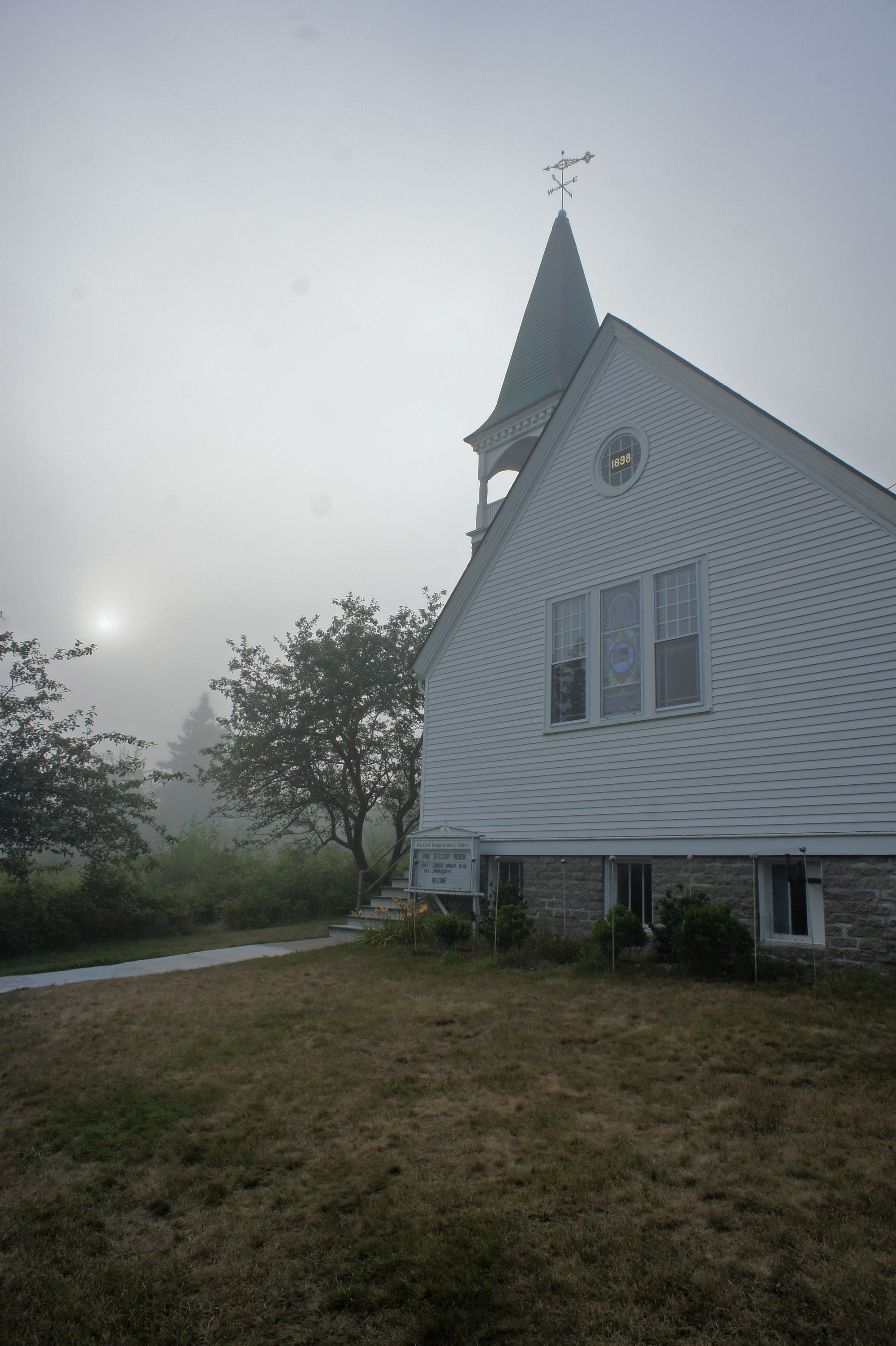
- Church in Islesford, Maine

- Seal

- Location within Maine Location within the United States
- Coordinates: 44°15′08″N 68°12′19″W
- Country: United States
- State: Maine
- County: Hancock
- Villages: Cranberry Isles; Islesford

Area
  - Total: 45.57 sq mi (118.03 km^{2})
  - Land: 3.17 sq mi (8.21 km^{2})
  - Water: 42.40 sq mi (109.82 km^{2})
- Elevation: 0 ft (0 m)

Population (2020)
  - Total: 160
  - Density: 51/sq mi (19.5/km^{2})
- Time zone: UTC-5 (Eastern (EST))
  - Summer (DST): UTC-4 (EDT)
- ZIP Codes: 04625 (Cranberry Isles); 04646 (Islesford)
- Area code: 207
- FIPS code: 23-14905
- GNIS feature ID: 582423
- Website: cranberryisles-me.gov

Cranberry Isles is a town in Hancock County, Maine, United States. The population was 160 at the 2020 census.

== Geography ==
According to the United States Census Bureau, the town has a total area of 45.57 square miles (118.03 km^{2}), of which 3.17 square miles (8.21 km^{2}) is land and 42.40 square miles (109.82 km^{2}) is water.

The Town of Cranberry Isles includes five islands: Great Cranberry Island (with the postal designation Cranberry Isles, ZIP code 04625), Little Cranberry Island (with the postal designation Islesford, ZIP code 04646), Sutton Island, Bear Island, and Baker Island. Only the first two islands have post offices or year-round populations.

== Demographics ==
Historical population
Census	Pop.	Note	%±
1830	258		—
1840	239		−7.4%
1850	283		18.4%
1860	345		21.9%
1870	350		1.4%
1880	343		−2.0%
1890	330		−3.8%
1900	374		13.3%
1910	399		6.7%
1920	410		2.8%
1930	349		−14.9%
1940	334		−4.3%
1950	228		−31.7%
1960	181		−20.6%
1970	186		2.8%
1980	198		6.5%
1990	189		−4.5%
2000	128		−32.3%
2010	141		10.2%
2020	160		13.5%
U.S. Decennial Census

=== 2010 census ===
As of the census of 2010, there were 141 people, 70 households, and 33 families residing in the town. The population density was 44.5 inhabitants per square mile (17.2/km^{2}). There were 375 housing units at an average density of 118.3 per square mile (45.7/km^{2}). The racial makeup of the town was 97.9% White, 0.7% African American, and 1.4% from two or more races. Hispanic or Latino of any race were 2.1% of the population.

There were 70 households, of which 20.0% had children under the age of 18 living with them, 37.1% were married couples living together, 5.7% had a female householder with no husband present, 4.3% had a male householder with no wife present, and 52.9% were non-families. 42.9% of all households were made up of individuals, and 20% had someone living alone who was 65 years of age or older. The average household size was 2.01 and the average family size was 2.70.

The median age in the town was 47.7 years. 17.7% of residents were under the age of 18; 4.3% were between the ages of 18 and 24; 23.3% were from 25 to 44; 34% were from 45 to 64; and 20.6% were 65 years of age or older. The gender makeup of the town was 54.6% male and 45.4% female.

=== 2000 census ===
As of the census of 2000, there were 128 people living year round in the Cranberry Isles. The population density of Great Cranberry Island was 40.3 people per square mile (15.6/km^{2}). There were 344 housing units at an average density of 108.4 per square mile (41.9/km^{2}). The racial makeup of the town was 98.44% White, and 1.56% from two or more races.

== See also ==
- List of islands of Maine
