= Lauren Wolk =

American author and poet

- Born: Baltimore, Maryland, U.S.
- Education: Brown University
- Occupations: Writer; poet; editor; English teacher
- Writing career
- Genre: Children's literature
- Website: www.laurenwolk.com

Lauren Wolk is an American author, poet and editor. Born in Baltimore, she studied English literature at Brown University graduating in 1981.

Wolk won a Newbery Honor in 2017 for her novel Wolf Hollow and the Scott O'Dell Award for Historical Fiction in 2018 for Beyond the Bright Sea.

== Career ==
Lauren Wolk began her career as a writer with the Battered Women's Project of the St. Paul American Indian Center and has since worked as an editor and an English teacher. She has been the Associate Director of the Cultural Center of Cape Cod since 2007.

== Awards ==
Wolf Hollow was shortlisted for the John Newbery Medal, Carnegie Medal and Goodread's Choice Award Best Middle Grade & Children's, winning an Honor for her John Newbery Medal shortlisting.

Beyond the Bright Sea was the 2018 winner for the Scott O'Dell Award for Historical Fiction, and was shortlisted for the 2018 Carnegie Medal and the 2017 Goodread's Choice Award Best Middle Grade & Children's.

Echo Mountain was shortlisted for the 2021 Carnegie Medal.

== Published works ==
- Those Who Favor Fire (1998)
- Wolf Hollow (2016)
  - German: Das Jahr, in dem ich lügen lernte (2017)
  - Italian: L'anno in cui imparai a raccontare storie (2018)
  - French: L'année où j'ai appris à mentir (2018)
- Beyond the Bright Sea (2017)
- Echo Mountain (2020)
- My Own Lightning (2022)
- Candle Island (2025)
