= Little Cranberry Island =

Island off the coast of Maine

Coordinates: 44°15′38.9″N 68°14′12.5″W

Little Cranberry Island is an island of roughly 200 acres (0.81 km^{2}) located in the U.S. state of Maine. It is one of the five islands of the Town of Cranberry Isles. It has the postal designation Islesford, ZIP code 04646.
