= Southwest Harbor, Maine =

Town in Maine, United States

- Town
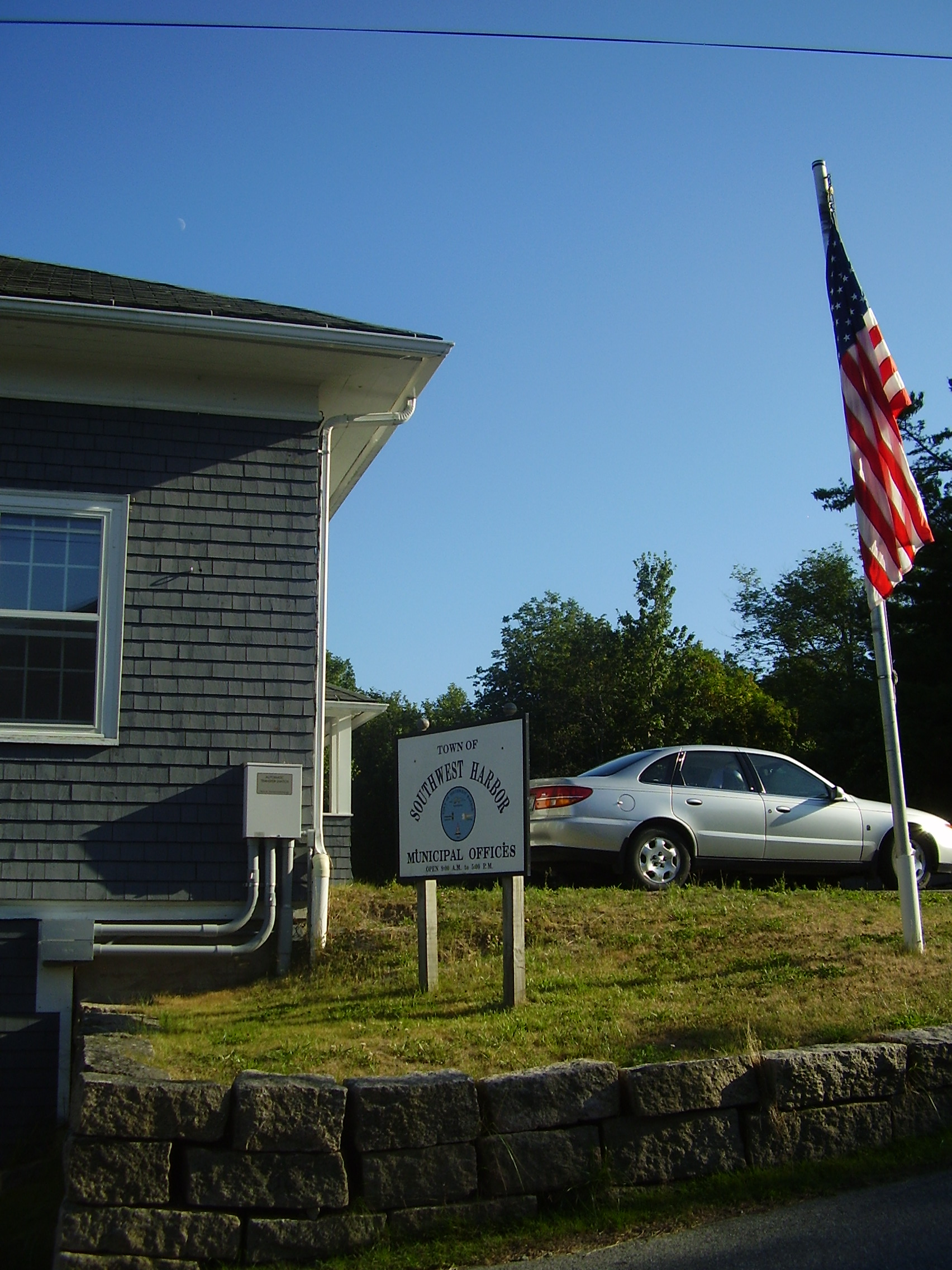
- Southwest Harbor Town Offices

- Seal

- Location within Maine Location within the United States
- Coordinates: 44°15′44″N 68°20′18″W
- Country: United States
- State: Maine
- County: Hancock
- Settled: 1761
- Incorporated (town): February 21, 1905
- Villages: Southwest Harbor; Manset; Seawall

Area
  - Total: 22.69 sq mi (58.77 km^{2})
  - Land: 13.51 sq mi (34.99 km^{2})
  - Water: 9.18 sq mi (23.78 km^{2})
- Elevation: 118 ft (36 m)

Population (2020)
  - Total: 1,756
  - Density: 130/sq mi (50.2/km^{2})
- Time zone: UTC-5 (Eastern (EST))
  - Summer (DST): UTC-4 (EDT)
- ZIP Code: 04679
- Area code: 207
- FIPS code: 23-72865
- GNIS feature ID: 582740
- Website: southwestharbormaine.org

Southwest Harbor is a town in Hancock County, Maine, United States. Located on Mount Desert Island, the population was 1,756 at the 2020 census. The municipality contains within it the villages of Southwest Harbor, Manset, Seawall, Wonderland, and Pemetic Hills.

== History ==
=== Indigenous peoples ===
Archaeological evidence indicates continuous Indigenous habitation of Mount Desert Island for thousands of years. The Wabanaki peoples, particularly the Penobscot and Passamaquoddy nations, called the island Pemetic, meaning "the sloping land." They seasonally traveled from the mainland to fish, hunt, and gather berries and shellfish in the Southwest Harbor area.

=== Early European settlement ===
The first permanent European settlement on Mount Desert Island was established in 1761 when Abraham Somes, a cooper from Gloucester, Massachusetts, and James Richardson brought their families to the area. Somes obtained land grants from Francis Bernard, the royal governor of Massachusetts, and established Somesville at the northern end of Somes Sound.

Early settlement of the Southwest Harbor area was primarily by fishermen and lumbermen. By the 1780s, Andrew Tucker had established himself as one of the area's early settlers, with historical records indicating that "sometime before 1784 Andrew Tucker established himself on this lot." By this time, fifteen families were located near Southwest Harbor, with ten living close to the protected cove that provided natural shelter for vessels.

=== Territorial development ===
Originally, Southwest Harbor was part of the larger Mount Desert township. In 1796, Eden (now Bar Harbor) was formed as a separate town. The town of Tremont was incorporated in 1848, encompassing what would later become Southwest Harbor.

Southwest Harbor finally incorporated as a separate municipality on February 21, 1905, when it separated from Tremont over a dispute regarding the construction of a new school. The town's name derives from its location at the southwest entrance to Somes Sound, positioned diagonally across from Northeast Harbor.

=== Maritime industries and economy ===
From its earliest days, Southwest Harbor developed as both a fishing community and maritime center. The town's strategic location made it an important exporter of lumber and fish, which led to the growth of shipbuilding as a major industry. Local shipyards built vessels ranging from small fishing boats to larger commercial craft.

The community established both lobster and sardine canneries to process the local catch, though both operations eventually closed. Southwest Harbor sent fishing vessels to participate in the Labrador fleet, with six schooners averaging 58 tons joining the fleet in 1839.

=== Tourism and hospitality development ===
Southwest Harbor was "the first destination on the Island for summer visitors in the years after the Civil War." The town's tourism industry began with the construction of early hotels to accommodate the growing number of visitors attracted by Mount Desert Island's scenery.

The most significant early hospitality establishment was the Claremont Hotel, built in 1883 by Captain Jesse Pease, a retired sea captain. Pease, who had made his final cargo run of sugar and molasses from Portland to New York in 1883, commissioned contractors to build the hotel he had long dreamed of operating. The Claremont opened in 1884 and quickly became popular with wealthy families from New York, New Jersey, Connecticut, and Massachusetts seeking to escape summer heat.

When Captain Pease died in 1910, his wife Grace continued managing the hotel until 1917, though she had sold it to Dr. Joseph D. Phillips in 1908. Dr. Phillips significantly expanded and improved the hotel, and also founded the Southwest Harbor Water Company, bringing pure water to the town. He served as both a state representative and senator, and was chosen as a presidential elector in 1928.

In 1911, the Pemetic Hotel (nicknamed "the Castle"), originally built by Deacon Henry Clark in 1878 as an addition to Clark's Island House Hotel, was moved and incorporated as a wing of the Claremont. The Claremont Hotel was listed on the National Register of Historic Places in 1978.

=== Modern boatbuilding industry ===
In the 20th century, Southwest Harbor evolved into a center for recreational boatbuilding. The Hinckley Yacht Company, founded in 1928, became an early pioneer in fiberglass boat construction, producing its first fiberglass model, the Bermuda 40, in 1959. Other notable boatbuilders in Southwest Harbor include Ellis Boat Company and Morris Yachts, both specializing in vessels designed for Maine and New England waters.

=== Community institutions ===
The Southwest Harbor Public Library was established in the 1880s, with the library building dedicated on October 31, 1895. The "Owl Club," an early friends group organized by Miss Nellie Carroll (later Mrs. Seth Thornton), contributed $115 to the building fund. Mrs. Thornton later authored Traditions and Records of Southwest Harbor and Somesville in 1938, an important historical record of the area.

The town has maintained its character as both a working waterfront community and tourist destination, with the United States Coast Guard operating a multipurpose facility and the cutter USCGC Bridle based in the harbor.

== Geography ==
According to the United States Census Bureau, the town has a total area of 22.69 square miles (58.77 km^{2}), of which 13.51 square miles (34.99 km^{2}) is land and 9.18 square miles (23.78 km^{2}) is water.

== Demographics ==
Historical population
Census	Pop.	Note	%±
1910	888		—
1920	824		−7.2%
1930	888		7.8%
1940	1,260		41.9%
1950	1,534		21.7%
1960	1,480		−3.5%
1970	1,657		12.0%
1980	1,855		11.9%
1990	1,952		5.2%
2000	1,966		0.7%
2010	1,764		−10.3%
2020	1,756		−0.5%
U.S. Decennial Census

=== 2010 census ===
As of the census of 2010, there were 1,764 people, 835 households, and 483 families living in the town. The population density was 130.6 inhabitants per square mile (50.4/km^{2}). There were 1,484 housing units at an average density of 109.8 per square mile (42.4/km^{2}). The racial makeup of the town was 97.3% White, 0.2% African American, 0.5% Native American, 0.3% Asian, 0.3% from other races, and 1.4% from two or more races. Hispanic or Latino of any race were 1.0% of the population.

There were 835 households, of which 24.2% had children under the age of 18 living with them, 44.2% were married couples living together, 10.1% had a female householder with no husband present, 3.6% had a male householder with no wife present, and 42.2% were non-families. 35.0% of all households were made up of individuals, and 15.7% had someone living alone who was 65 years of age or older. The average household size was 2.10 and the average family size was 2.69.

The median age in the town was 47.2 years. 19.4% of residents were under the age of 18; 7.1% were between the ages of 18 and 24; 20% were from 25 to 44; 31.3% were from 45 to 64; and 22.1% were 65 years of age or older. The gender makeup of the town was 47.0% male and 53.0% female.

=== 2000 census ===
As of the census of 2000, there were 1,966 people, 899 households, and 534 families living in the town. The population density was 145.6 inhabitants per square mile (56.2/km^{2}). There were 1,288 housing units at an average density of 95.4 per square mile (36.8/km^{2}). The racial makeup of the town was 98.37% White, 0.31% African American, 0.15% Native American, 0.15% Asian, 0.31% from other races, and 0.71% from two or more races. Hispanic or Latino of any race were 0.56% of the population.

There were 899 households, out of which 24.9% had children under the age of 18 living with them, 47.9% were married couples living together, 8.3% had a female householder with no husband present, and 40.5% were non-families. Of all households 34.0% were made up of individuals, and 16.9% had someone living alone who was 65 years of age or older. The average household size was 2.15 and the average family size was 2.76.

In the town, the population was spread out, with 20.7% under the age of 18, 7.4% from 18 to 24, 26.2% from 25 to 44, 26.0% from 45 to 64, and 19.6% who were 65 years of age or older. The median age was 42 years. For every 100 females, there were 90.9 males. For every 100 females age 18 and over, there were 90.7 males.

The median income for a household in the town was $36,555, and the median income for a family was $50,000. Males had a median income of $29,792 versus $24,044 for females. The per capita income for the town was $21,509. About 8.8% of families and 12.0% of the population were below the poverty line, including 17.3% of those under age 18 and 6.3% of those age 65 or over.

== Education ==
Southwest Harbor has one school, Pemetic Elementary School. The school educates students in kindergarten through eighth grade. The building originally housed Pemetic High School, which served Southwest Harbor and the neighboring town of Tremont. The elementary school includes two baseball fields and a soccer field. Today, high school students from Southwest Harbor and Tremont attend Mount Desert Island High School in the town of Mount Desert.

== Business and industry ==
Hinckley Yachts maintains its headquarters, design, construction, and repair facilities in Southwest Harbor. Other boat companies in the town include Ellis Boat Company and Morris Yachts, both of which build, among other types, boats tailored for use in Maine and New England. MapsAlive, a software as a service company providing interactive maps and floor plans, is also located in Southwest Harbor.

The United States Coast Guard maintains a multipurpose facility in the town; USCGC Bridle is based there as well.

The Claremont Hotel, built in 1883, is listed on the National Register of Historic Places.

== Notable people ==
- Myrna Fahey, actress
- Wendell Gilley, artist, bird carvings
- John Johnston, chemist
- Agnes Newhall Stillwell, archaeologist

== In popular culture ==
- Location filming for the 1999 television mini-series Storm of the Century took place in Southwest Harbor.

== Gallery ==
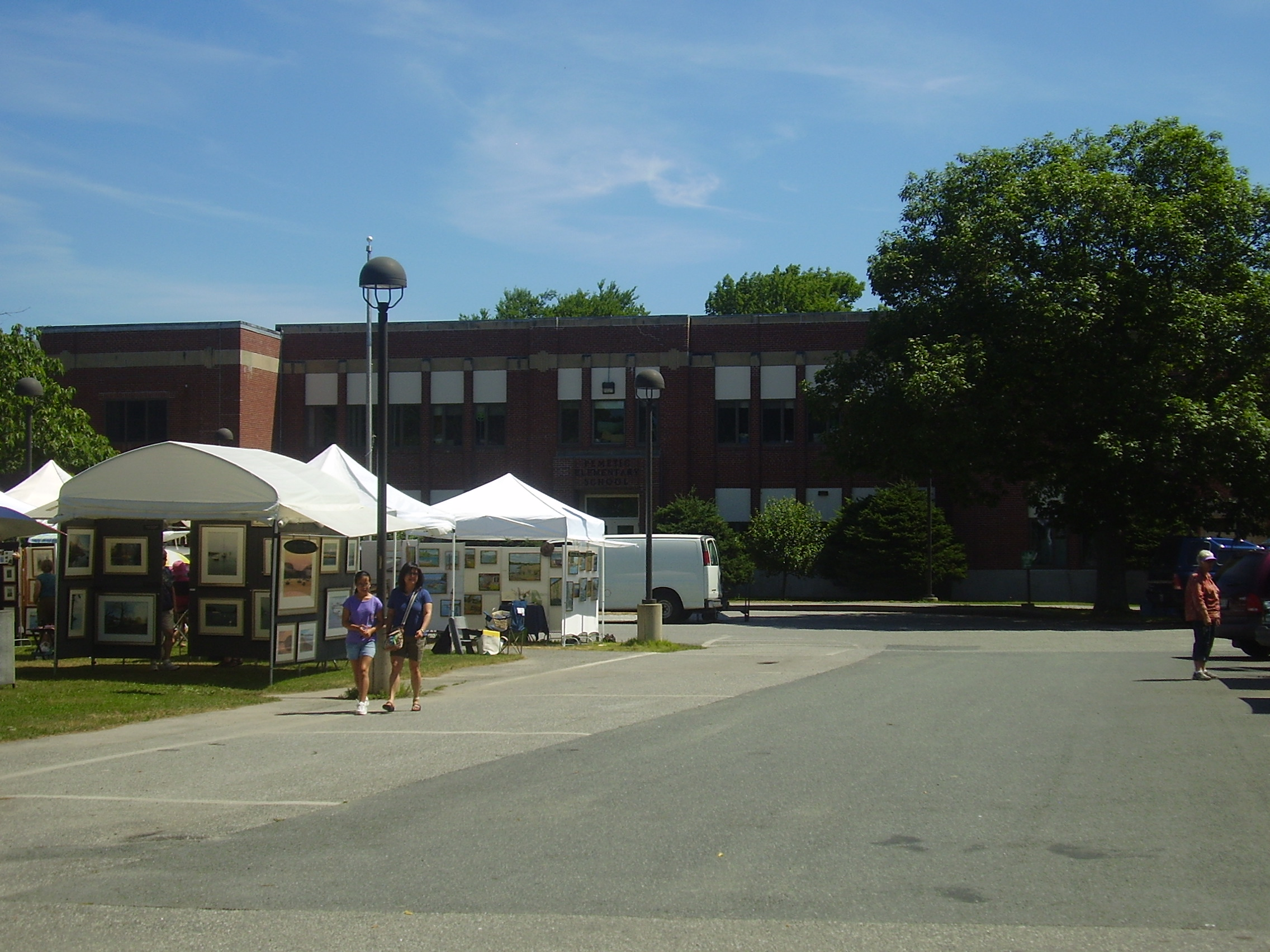
Pemetic Elementary School

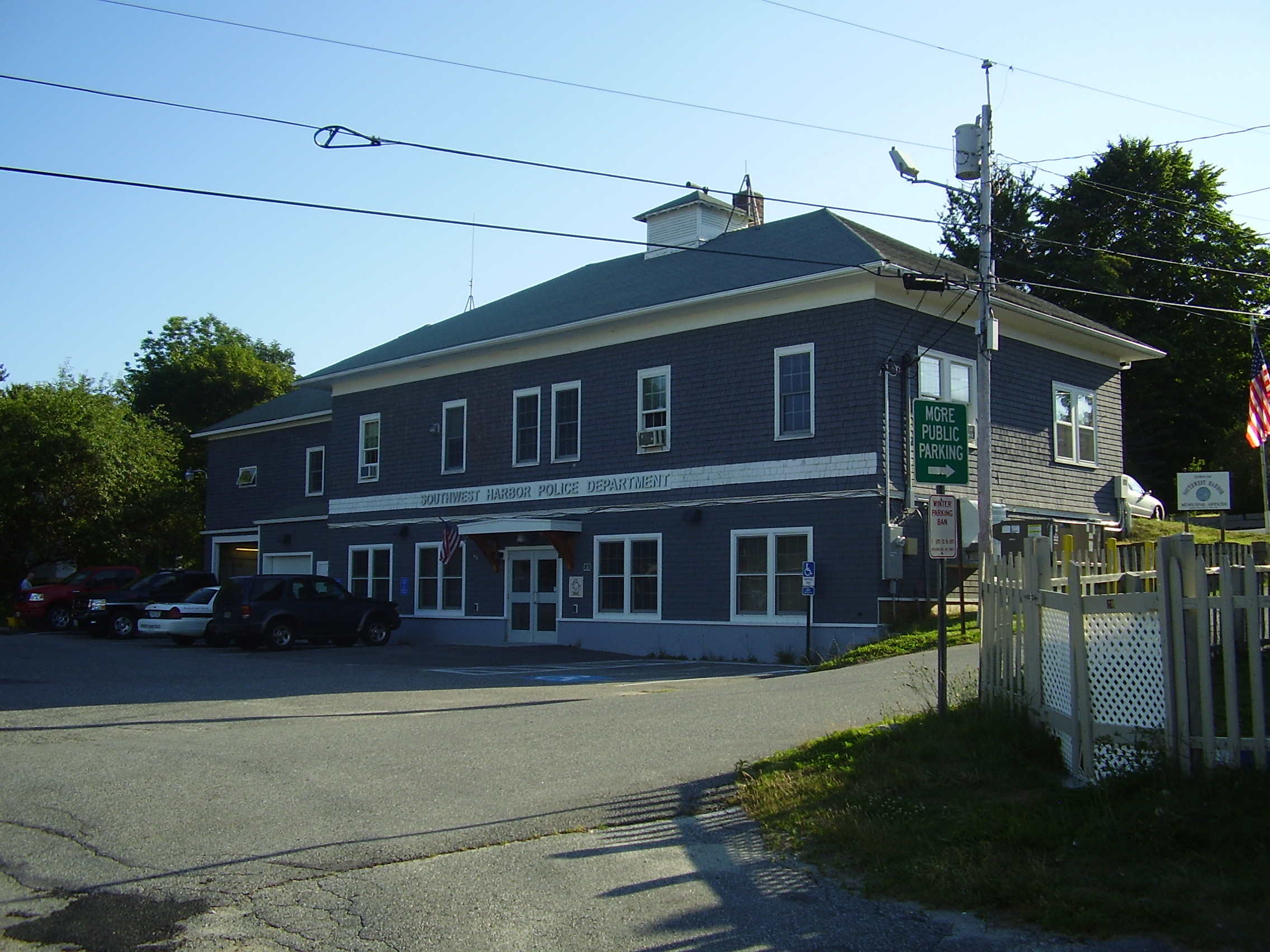
Southwest Harbor Police Department

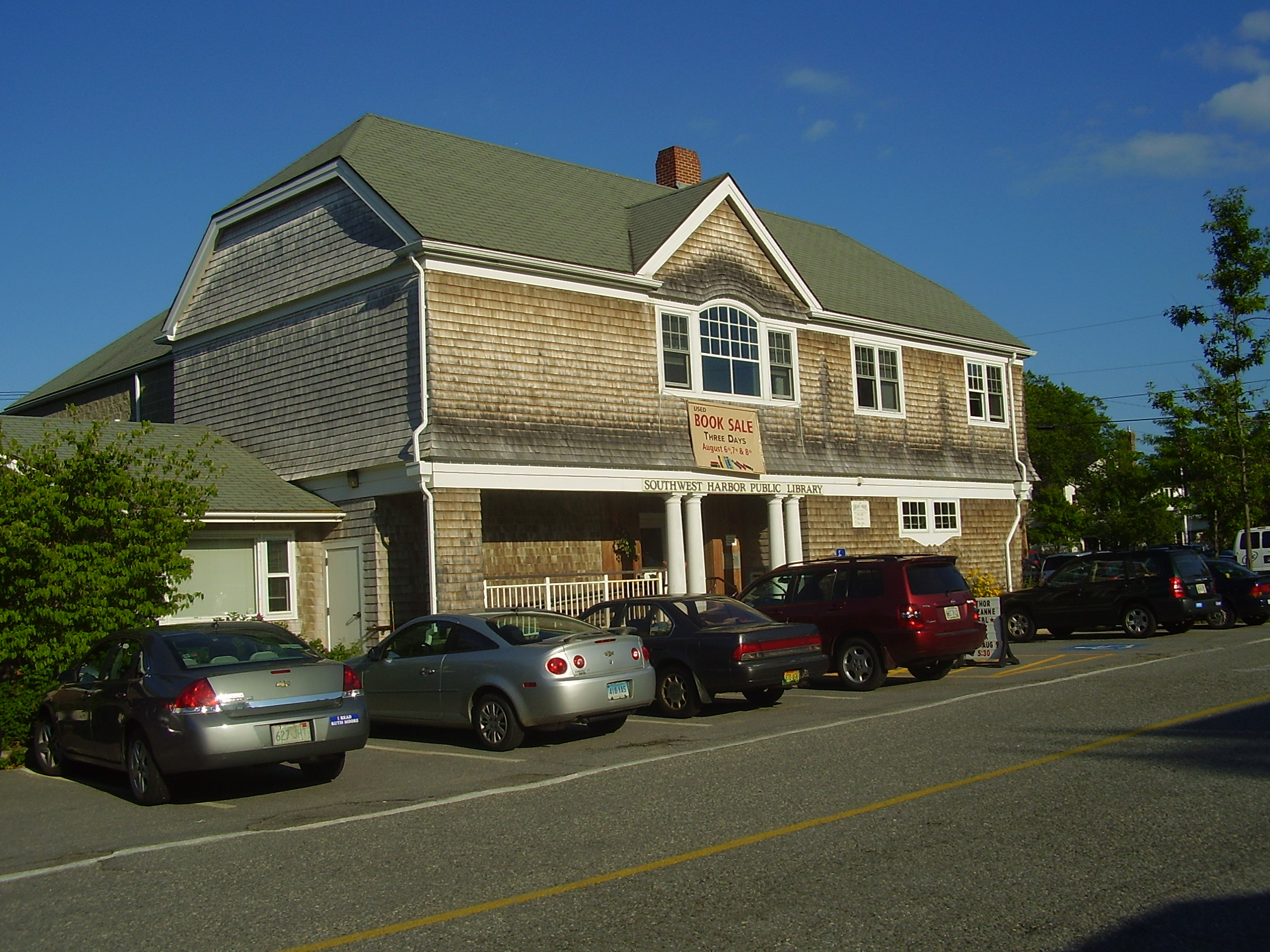
Southwest Harbor Public Library

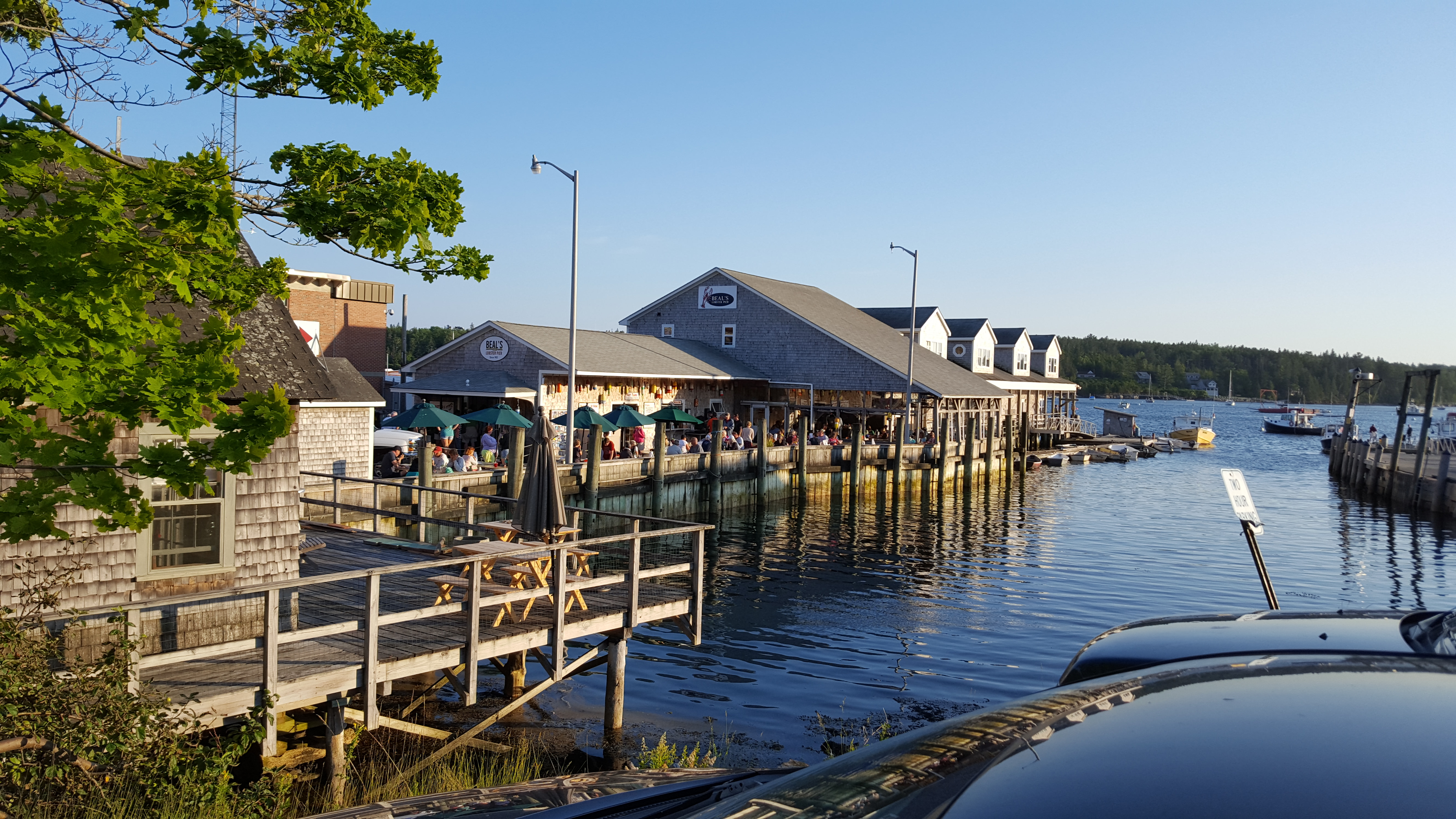
Beal's Lobster Pound
