= Claremont Hotel (Southwest Harbor, Maine) =

Historic hotel in Maine, United States

- U.S. National Register of Historic Places
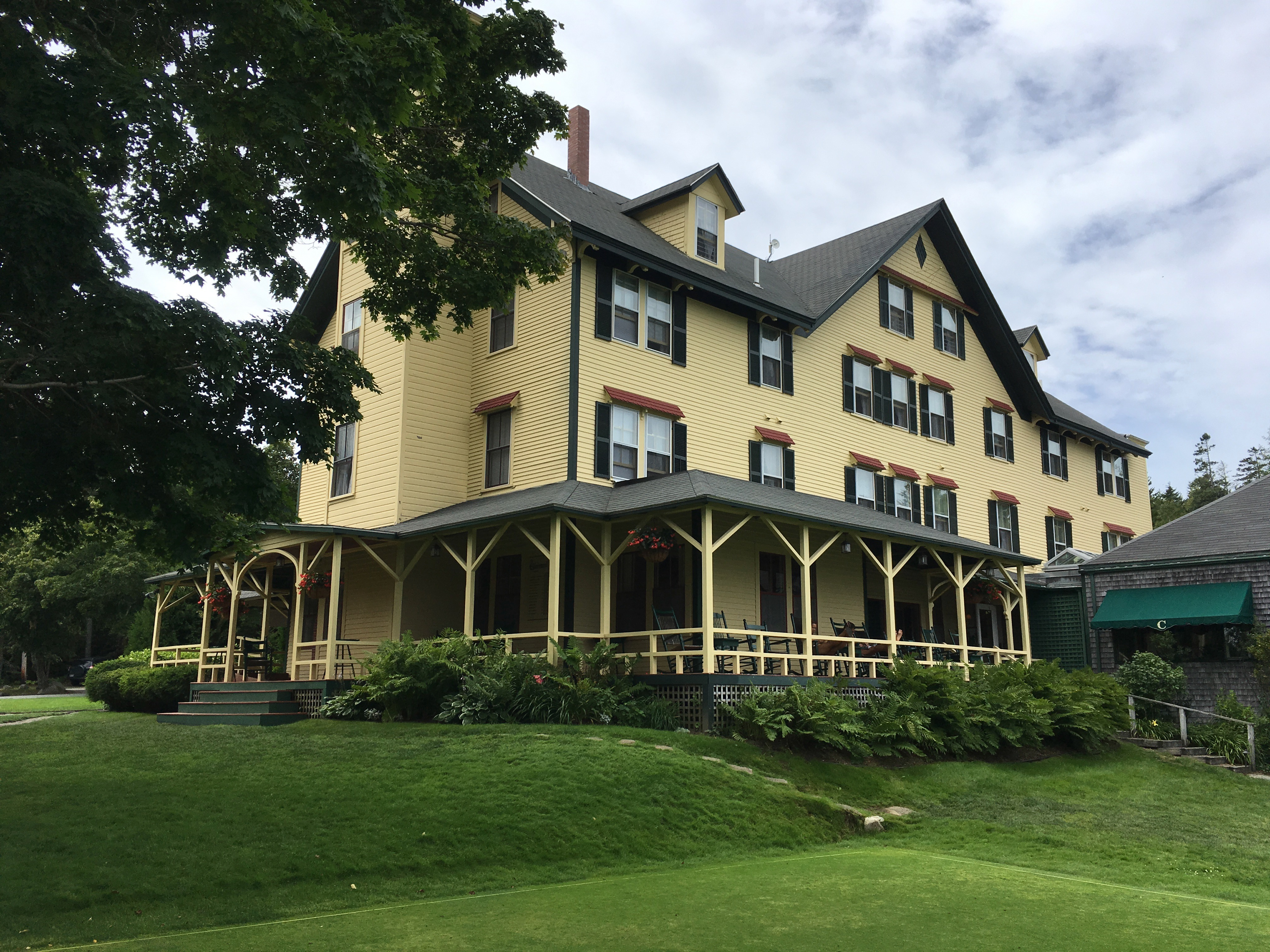
- The hotel prior to renovations (before 2020)

- Location within Maine Location within the United States
- Location: Claremont Rd, Southwest Harbor, Maine
- Coordinates: 44°16′44″N 68°18′46″W
- Area: 2 acres (0.81 ha)
- Built: 1883
- Architectural style: Late Victorian
- Restored: 2020
- NRHP reference No.: 78000162
- Added to NRHP: March 29, 1978

The Claremont Hotel (referred to as The Claremont Hotel) is a historic hotel on Claremont Road in Southwest Harbor, Maine. Built in 1883, the main hotel building is one of the only 19th-century hotels to survive on Mount Desert Island.

In 2020, Kennebunkport-based Claremont Hospitality LLC led by Tim Harrington, has acquired the hotel for an undisclosed price. Harrington has invested $20+ million in a nine-month redevelopment of the property which was completed in time for the 2021 summer season. The hotel facilities now include 34 guest rooms, four suites (in the Phillips House) and 12 cottages overlooking Somes Sound. It also has two restaurants and a bar.

== Main building ==
The main building of the Claremont was built in 1883 by Jesse Pease, a retired sea captain, and was one of the first large hotels to be built on Mount Desert Island. It is a 3 1/2-story wood-frame structure, finished in clapboards, with a cross-gabled hip roof and a stone foundation. The main (west-facing) facade is seven bays wide, with a simple port-cochere near the south end providing entrance to the building. A single-story porch wraps around the south and east facades (the latter facing Somes Sound). From the eastern facade a broad lawn extends down to the waterfront, where there is a boathouse. The interior has been modernized, but with attention to maintaining original Victorian features. The building was listed on the National Register of Historic Places in 1978. The building currently has 24 private rooms, as well as Xanthus, the hotel's restaurant.

The hotel was run by Jesse Pease and his wife until his death in 1900. She continued to operate the hotel until her death in 1917, but sold the property in 1908 to Joseph Phillips, a local doctor. Phillips and later his son ran the property until 1971.

== Cabins ==
The property includes fourteen cabins, sited to give views of Somes Sound. They are stylistically varied, with some built in the style of traditional Maine log cabins, and others in modern architectural styles. Most provide accommodations for up to four guests, although some only have space for two, and the Rowse House accommodates eight. The cottages are available between May and October for daily rentals; the Rowse House is rented by the week.

== See also ==
- National Register of Historic Places listings in Hancock County, Maine
