= Stilwell =

Stilwell or Stillwell may refer to:

== People ==
- Agnes Newhall Stillwell (1906–1957), American archaeologist
- Arthur Stilwell (1859–1928), Kansas City Southern Railway founder
- Bill Stilwell, Author and naturalist, author of three national best-sellers
- Frank Stilwell (1856–1882), Old West outlaw
- Frank Stilwell (born 1945), Australian political economist
- G. R. Stilwell, of the Ives–Stilwell experiment
- Heather Stilwell (1944–2010), school trustee in Surrey, British Columbia
- Isabel Stilwell (born 1960), Portuguese journalist and historical author
- John Stillwell (born 1942), Australian mathematician
- Joseph Stilwell (1883–1946), U.S. Army four-star general
- Joseph Warren Stilwell Jr. (1912–1966), U.S. Army general, son of Joseph Stilwell
- Margaret Stillwell (1887 – 1984) American librarian and bibliographer
- Michelle Stilwell (born 1974), Canadian wheelchair racer and politician
- Mima Stilwell, English singer
- Natasha Stillwell, Canadian TV producer and Daily Planet and former co-host
- Richard G. Stilwell (1917–1991), U.S. Army general
- Silas M. Stilwell (1800–1881), American politician who sat in the Tennessee, Virginia and New York legislatures
- Simpson E. Stilwell (1850–1903), Indian fighter, U.S. Army scout, judge
- Stephen J. Stilwell (1866–1942), New York politician
- Victoria Stilwell (born 1969), English dog trainer

== Places in the United States ==
- Stillwell, Indiana, an unincorporated place
- Stilwell, Kansas, an unincorporated township
- Stilwell, Oklahoma, a city
- Stillwell Avenue, a major avenue in southern Brooklyn

== Other ==
- Stillwell, a hard rock band
- Madelyn Stillwell, a character in the Amazon series The Boys
- Stillwell Gardner, a character in A League of Their Own
