= Mount Desert Island =

Largest island off the coast of Maine in the US

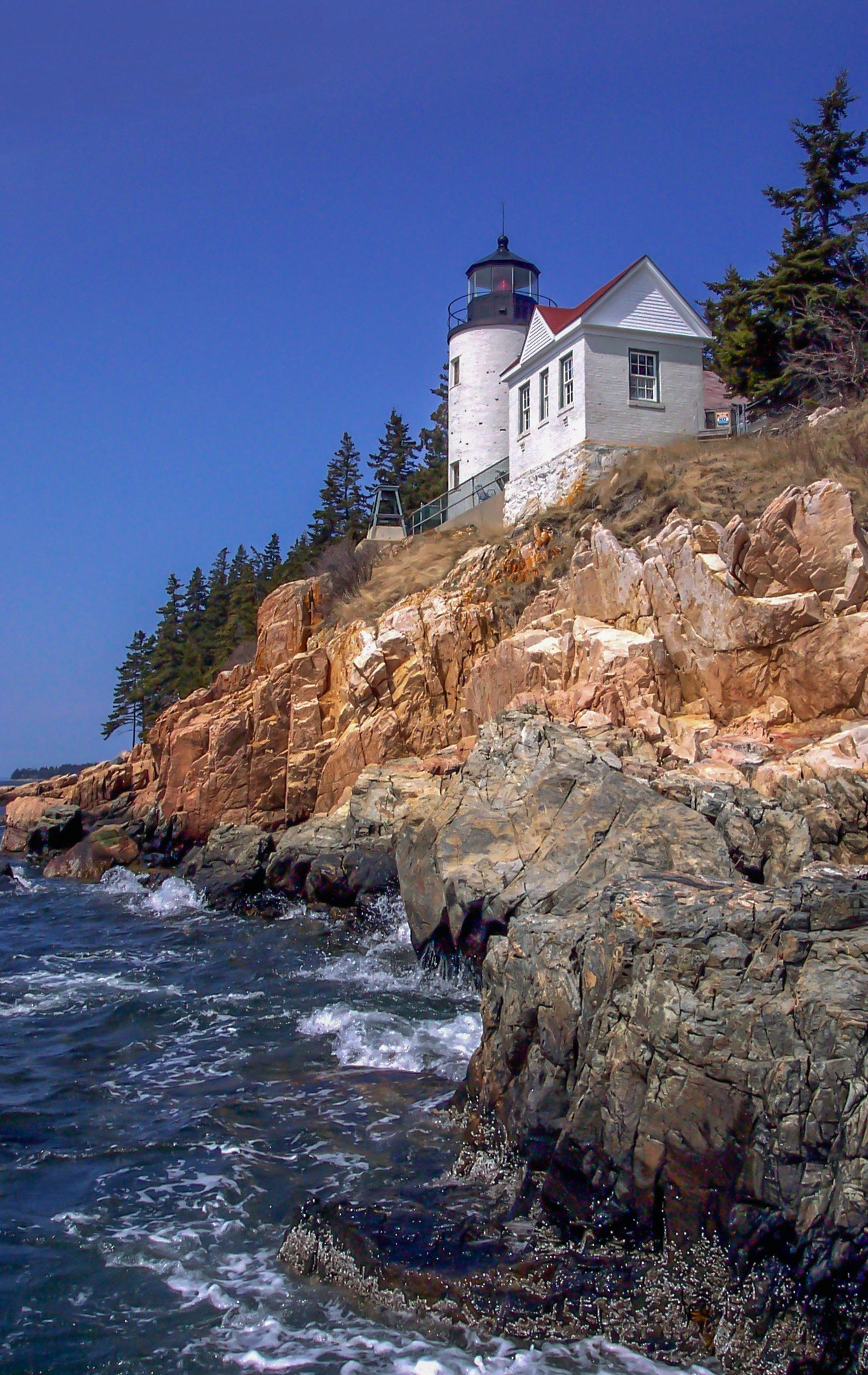
- Bass Harbor Head Light

- Location within Maine

Geography
- Location: Atlantic Ocean
- Coordinates: 44.342827°N 68.307138°W
- Area: 108 sq mi (280 km^{2})
- Highest elevation: 466 m (1,528 ft)
- Highest point: Cadillac Mountain

Administration
- United States
- State: Maine
- County: Hancock County
- Largest settlement: Bar Harbor (pop. 5,235 people in 2010)

Demographics
- Population: 10,535 (2020)
- Pop. density: 96.8/sq mi (37.37/km^{2})
- Ethnic groups: 91.0% White, 2.1% Asian 1.2% Black or African American, 0.9% Other or Hawaiian or other Pacific Islander, 0.5% American Indian or Alaskan Native

Additional information
- Demographic figures taken by adding totals for Bar Harbor town, Mount Desert town, Southwest Harbor town, and Tremont town county subdivisions.

Mount Desert Island (MDI; French: Île des Monts Déserts; Malecite-Passamaquoddy: Pesamkuk) is the largest island of Maine, United States. Lying in Hancock County off the north-central coast, it has an area of 108 square miles (280 km^{2}), making it the sixth-largest island in the contiguous United States, and the second-largest island on the Eastern Seaboard, behind Long Island and ahead of Martha's Vineyard. According to the 2020 census, the island has a year-round population of 10,535. In 2017, an estimated 3.5 million tourists visited Acadia National Park on MDI. The island is home to numerous well-known summer colonies such as Northeast Harbor and Bar Harbor.

== Origin of the name ==
Some residents stress the second syllable (/dɪˈzɜːrt/ dih-ZURT), while others pronounce it like the English common noun desert (/ˈdɛzərt/ DEZ-ərt). French explorer Samuel de Champlain's observation that the summits of the island's mountains were free of vegetation as seen from the sea led him to call the island L'Isle des Monts-déserts (meaning 'The Island of Barren Mountains').

== Towns and villages ==
There are four towns on Mount Desert Island:

- Bar Harbor, with the villages of Eden, Hulls Cove, Salisbury Cove, and Town Hill;
- Mount Desert, with the villages of Hall Quarry, Northeast Harbor, Otter Creek, Pretty Marsh, Seal Harbor, and Somesville;
- Southwest Harbor, with the villages of Manset and Seawall;
- Tremont, with the villages of Bass Harbor, Bernard, Gotts Island, Seal Cove, and West Tremont.

== History ==
=== Indigenous peoples and early habitation ===
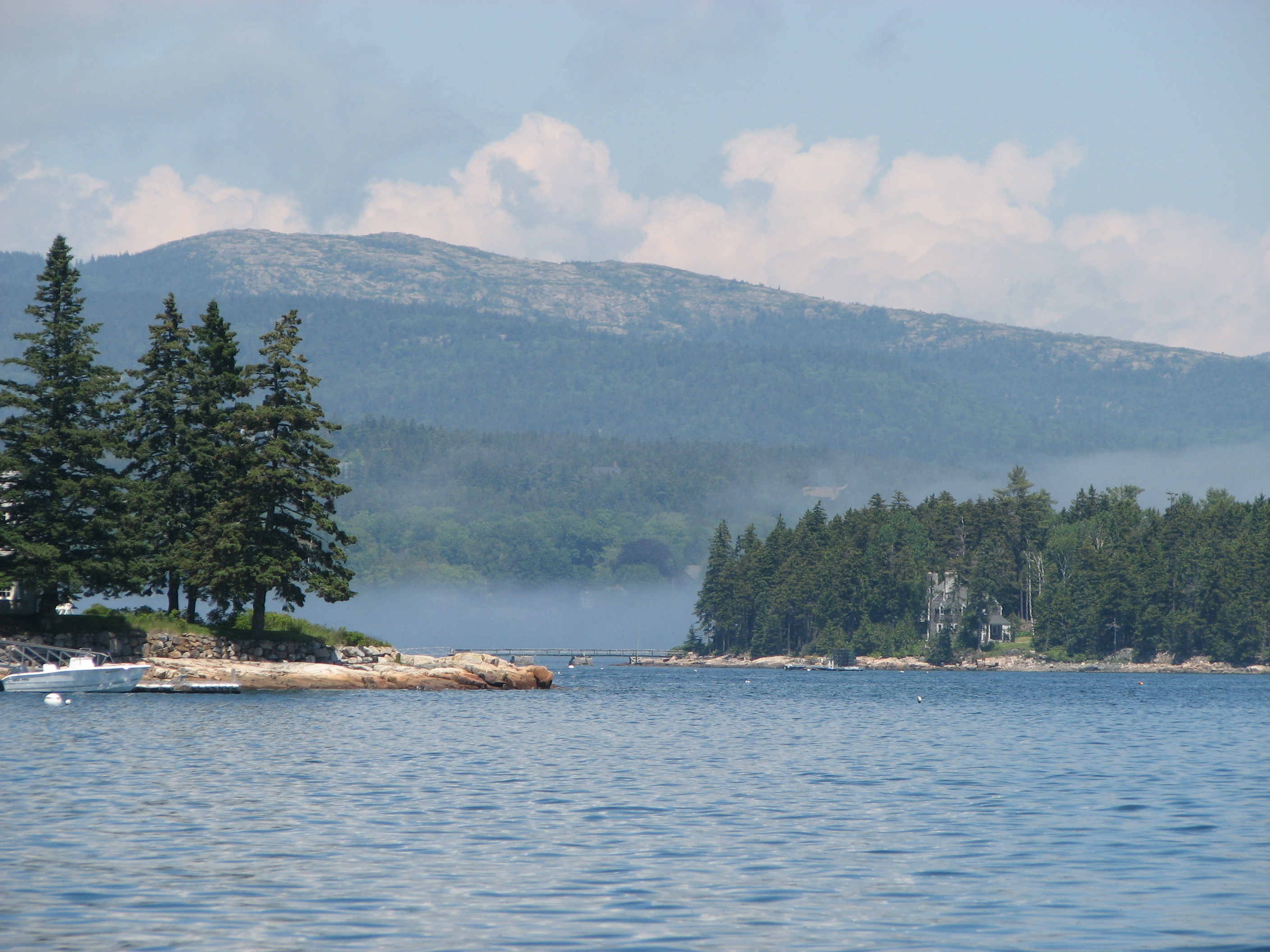
View of the coast near Southwest Harbor

Archaeological evidence, including extensive shell middens, indicates continuous Indigenous habitation of Mount Desert Island for at least 6,000 years. The Wabanaki peoples, particularly the Penobscot and Passamaquoddy nations of the Abenaki linguistic group, called the island Pemetic, meaning "the sloping land".

Archaeological evidence suggests Native Americans wintered on the coast to avoid harsh inland conditions and take advantage of marine resources, then moved inland during summers for salmon runs and forest gathering. The Wabanaki constructed bark-covered conical dwellings and traveled in birchbark canoes that European observers praised for their design and speed.

=== French colonial period (1604–1759) ===
==== French exploration ====
The first documented European encounter occurred on September 6, 1604, when Pierre Dugua, Sieur de Mons led an exploring party from the St. Croix Settlement. Sailing in a patache with twelve sailors and two Indigenous guides while searching for the rumored city of Norumbega, Samuel de Champlain crossed Frenchman Bay toward Otter Creek. During high tide, their vessel struck a ledge off what is now Otter Cliff, and while making repairs, two Indigenous people boarded as guides.

Champlain recorded: "Le sommet de la plus part d'icelles est desgarny d'arbres parceque ce ne sont que roches. Je l'ay nommée l'Isle des Monts-déserts" ("Most of the summits are bare of trees because they are nothing but rocks. I have named it the Island of the Desert Mountains").

==== Saint-Sauveur Mission and the 1613 raid ====
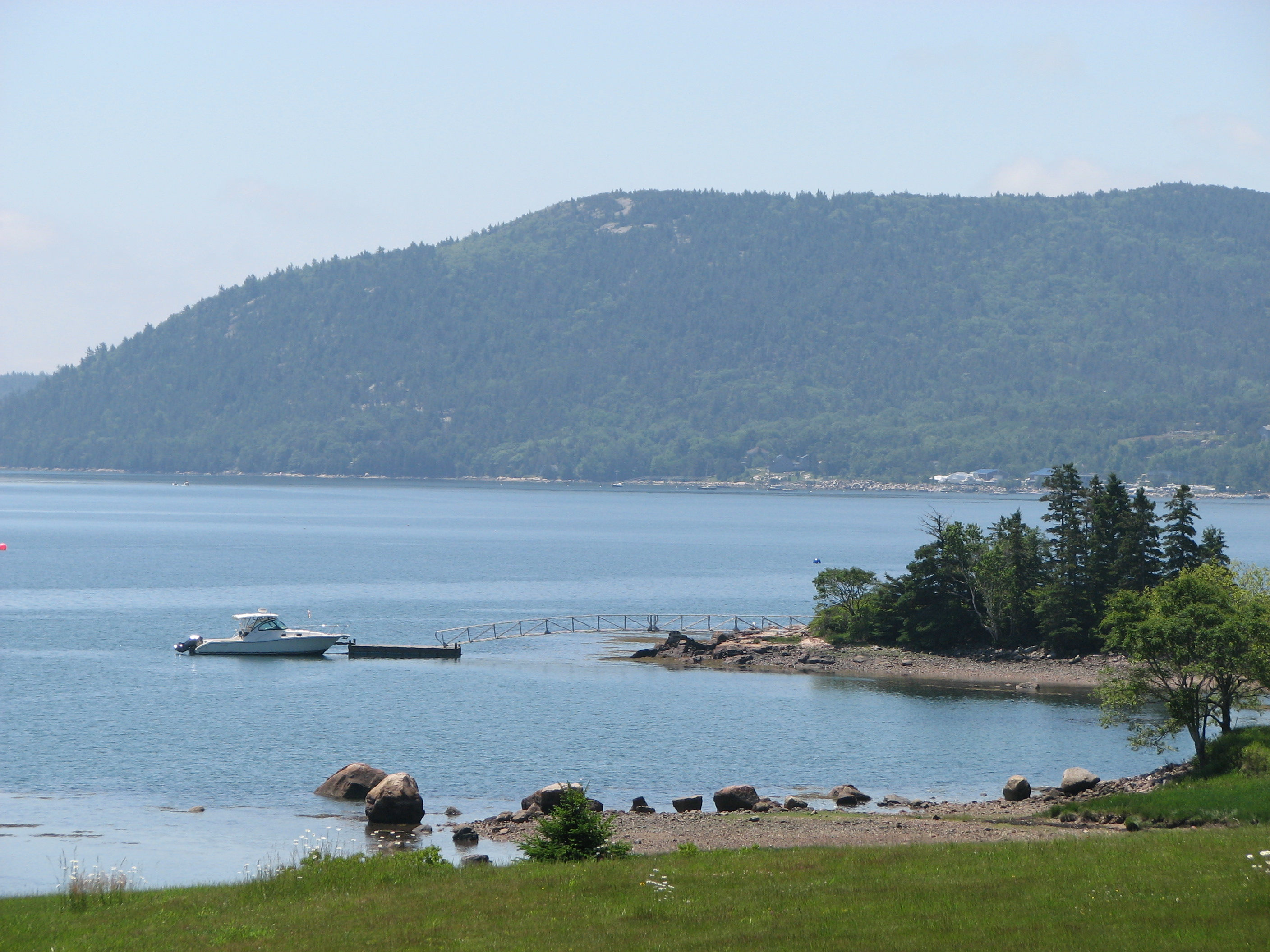
Somes Sound, site of the first French mission in North America

In 1613, French Jesuit missionaries established Saint-Sauveur Mission on present-day Fernald Point near Somes Sound—the first French Catholic mission in North America. On July 2, 1613, Virginia colonial captain Samuel Argall arrived aboard the Treasurer and destroyed the mission. Three missionaries were killed, three wounded, and approximately twenty prisoners were taken to Jamestown. Argall destroyed the buildings, replaced the Catholic cross with a Protestant one, then continued to eliminate French settlements at Saint Croix Island and Port-Royal.

Claude de La Tour quickly established a fur-trading post at nearby Castine to maintain French influence.

==== Cadillac's land grant ====
In 1688, Antoine de la Mothe Cadillac received a royal grant for 100,000 acres (400 km^{2}) along the Maine coast, including all of Mount Desert Island. Despite ambitious plans for a feudal estate, Cadillac and his wife abandoned the project after a brief residence. Cadillac later founded Detroit. The island's highest peak, Cadillac Mountain (1,528 feet (466 m)), bears his name and is among the first places in the United States to receive morning sunlight during fall and winter months.

==== Queen Anne's War raids ====
During Queen Anne's War, Mount Desert Island served as a staging ground for English raids against Acadian settlements. In 1704, Benjamin Church gathered forces at the island before conducting raids on Castine, St. Stephen, Grand-Pré, and other Acadian communities.

=== British colonial period (1759–1775) ===
The British conquest of Acadia in 1759 opened Maine coastal lands for British colonial settlement. Sir Francis Bernard, royal governor of Massachusetts, secured a land grant for Mount Desert Island and recruited settlers by offering free land. In 1760, Abraham Somes and James Richardson became the island's first permanent European settlers, establishing homesteads at present-day Somesville.

=== Revolutionary period and early statehood (1775–1850) ===
The American Revolution disrupted Bernard's colonization plans. As a Loyalist, he lost his land claims following American independence. Massachusetts granted the western half of Mount Desert Island to John Bernard (the governor's son, who supported the Patriots) and the eastern half to Marie Thérèse de Grégoire (Cadillac's granddaughter). Both quickly sold to absentee landlords.

By Maine's statehood in 1820, the island supported farming, lumbering, fishing, and shipbuilding. Settlers cleared hundreds of acres, producing everything from schooners to household goods. Agriculture focused on wheat, rye, corn, and potatoes. By 1850, fishing fleets, fish-processing facilities, and shipyards dominated the landscape. Granite quarrying became important, taking advantage of high-quality stone deposits near deep-water anchorages for shipping to major East Coast cities.

== Rusticators ==
It was the outsiders, artists, and journalists who revealed and popularized this island to the world in the mid 19th century. Painters of the Hudson River School, including Thomas Cole and Frederic Church, inspired patrons and friends to flock here. Called rusticators, despite the lack of existing accommodations they sought out local fishermen and farmers to put them up for a modest fee. The rusticators returned to renew friendships with local islanders and, most of all, to savor the fresh salt air, scenery, and relaxed pace. In 1867, Clara Barnes Martin published the popular guidebook, Mount Desert on the Coast of Maine. Soon the villagers' cottages and fishermen's huts filled to overflowing, and by 1880, 30 hotels competed for vacationers' dollars. Tourism was becoming the major industry.

For a select handful of Americans, the 1880s and the "Gay Nineties" meant affluence on a scale without precedent. Mount Desert, still remote from the cities of the East, became a retreat for prominent people of the time. The Rockefellers, Morgans, Fords, Vanderbilts, Carnegies, and Astors chose to spend their summers here.

Not content with the simple lodgings then available, these families transformed the landscape of Mount Desert Island with elegant estates, called "cottages". The landscape architect Beatrix Farrand, at the Cadwalder Rawle - Rhinelander Jones family summer home Reef Point Estate, designed the gardens for many of these people. Projects included the Chinese-inspired garden at "The Eyrie" for Abby Aldrich Rockefeller at Seal Harbor (1926–1935), and the planting plans for subtle roads at Acadia National Park sponsored by John D. Rockefeller Jr. (c. 1930). Luxury, refinement, and ostentatious gatherings replaced buckboard rides, picnics, and day-long hikes of an earlier era.

Some rusticators also formed "Village Improvement Societies" which constructed hiking trails and walking paths connecting the Island's villages to its interior mountains. For over 40 years, the wealthy held sway at Mount Desert, but the Great Depression and World War II marked the end of such extravagance. The final blow came in 1947 when a fire of monumental proportions consumed many of the great estates.

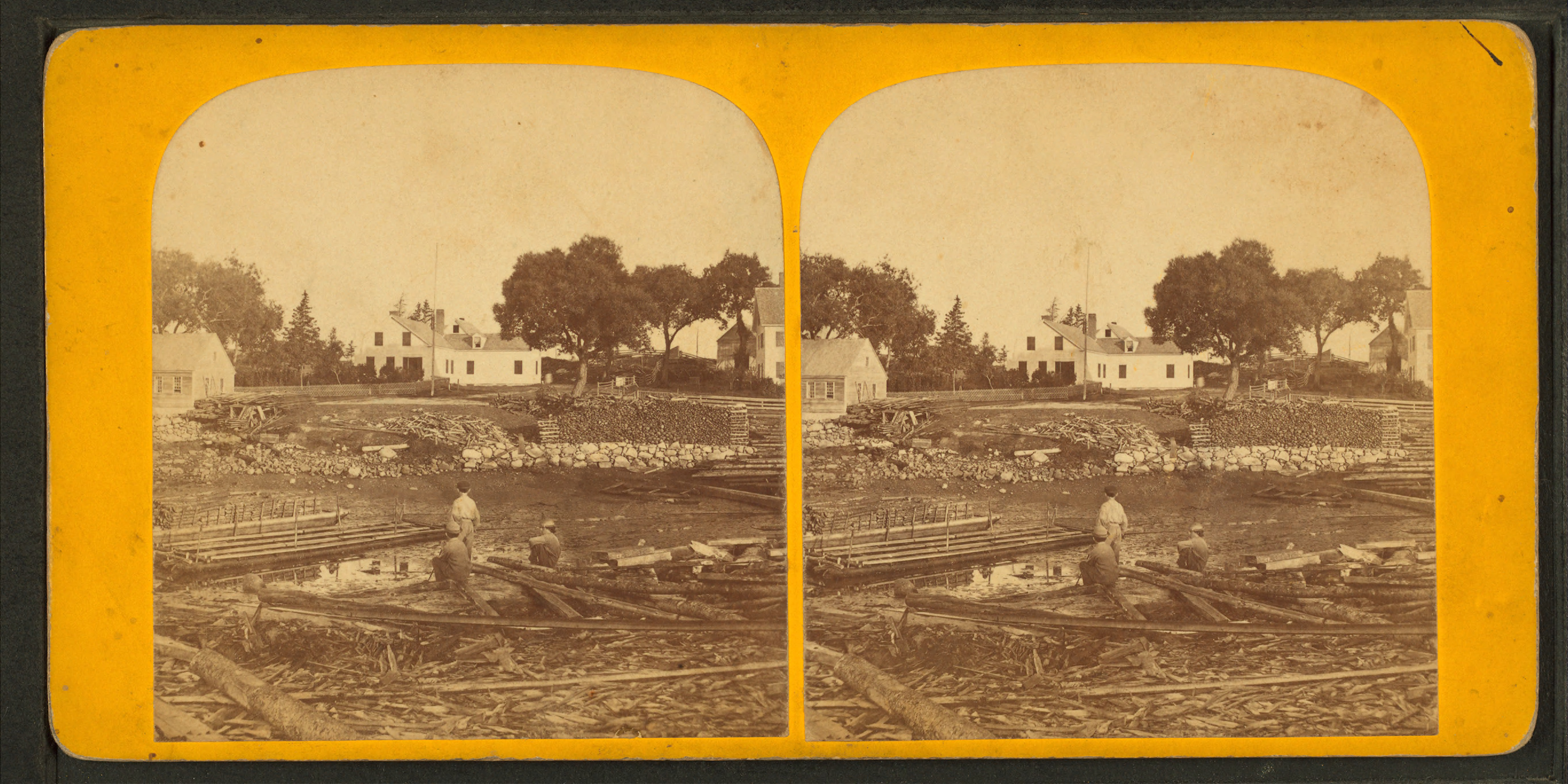
Somes' Hotel c. 1870, John D. Heywood

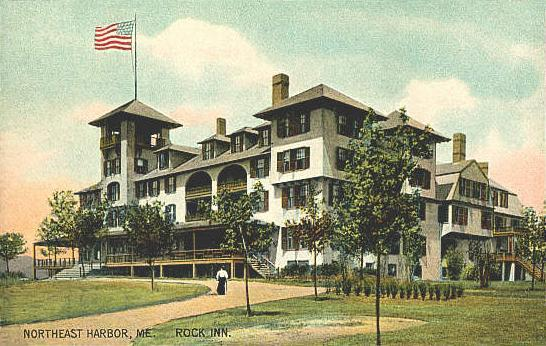
Rock Inn, Northeast Harbor c. 1908

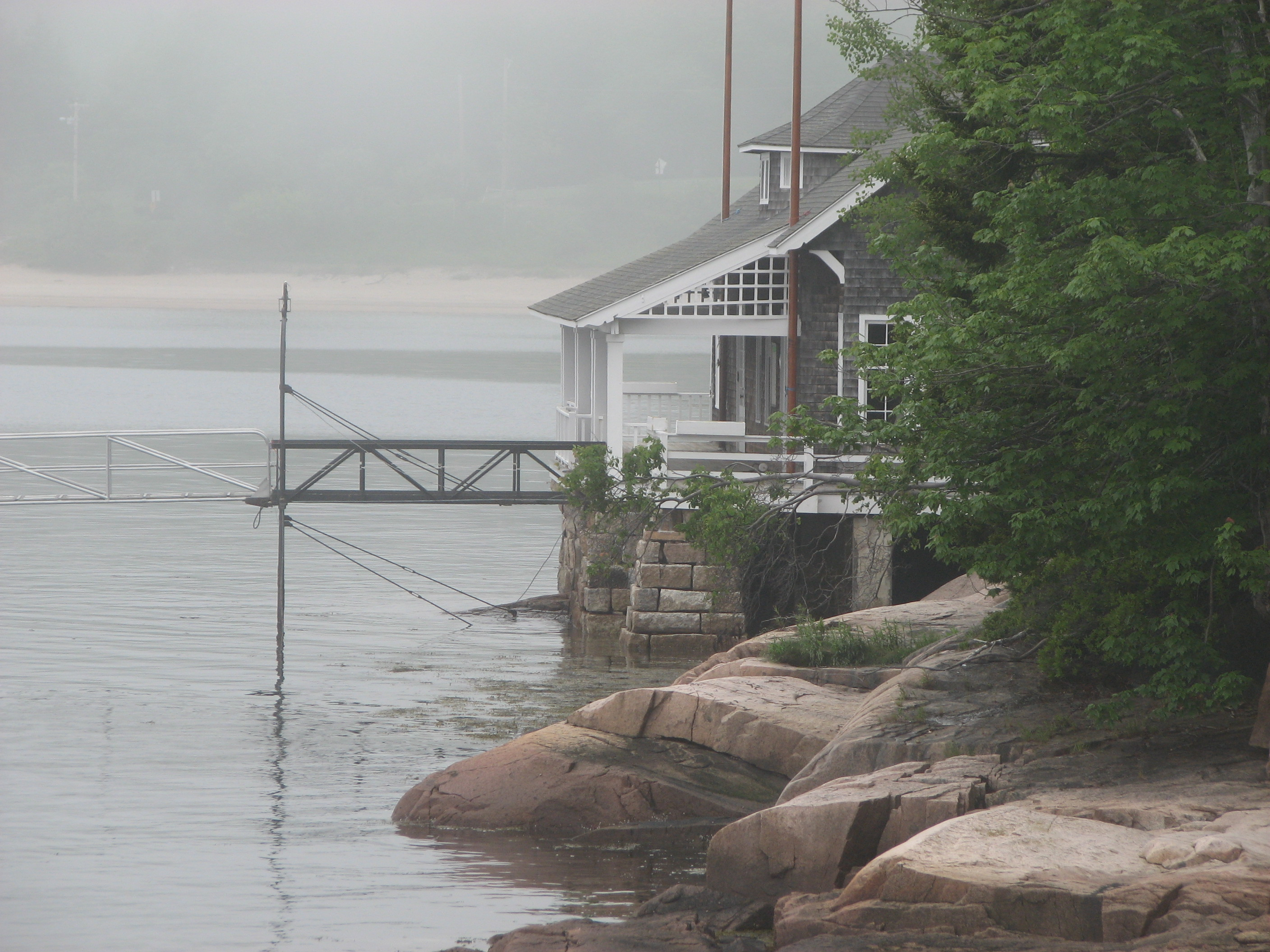
Seal Harbor Yacht Club

== Acadia National Park ==
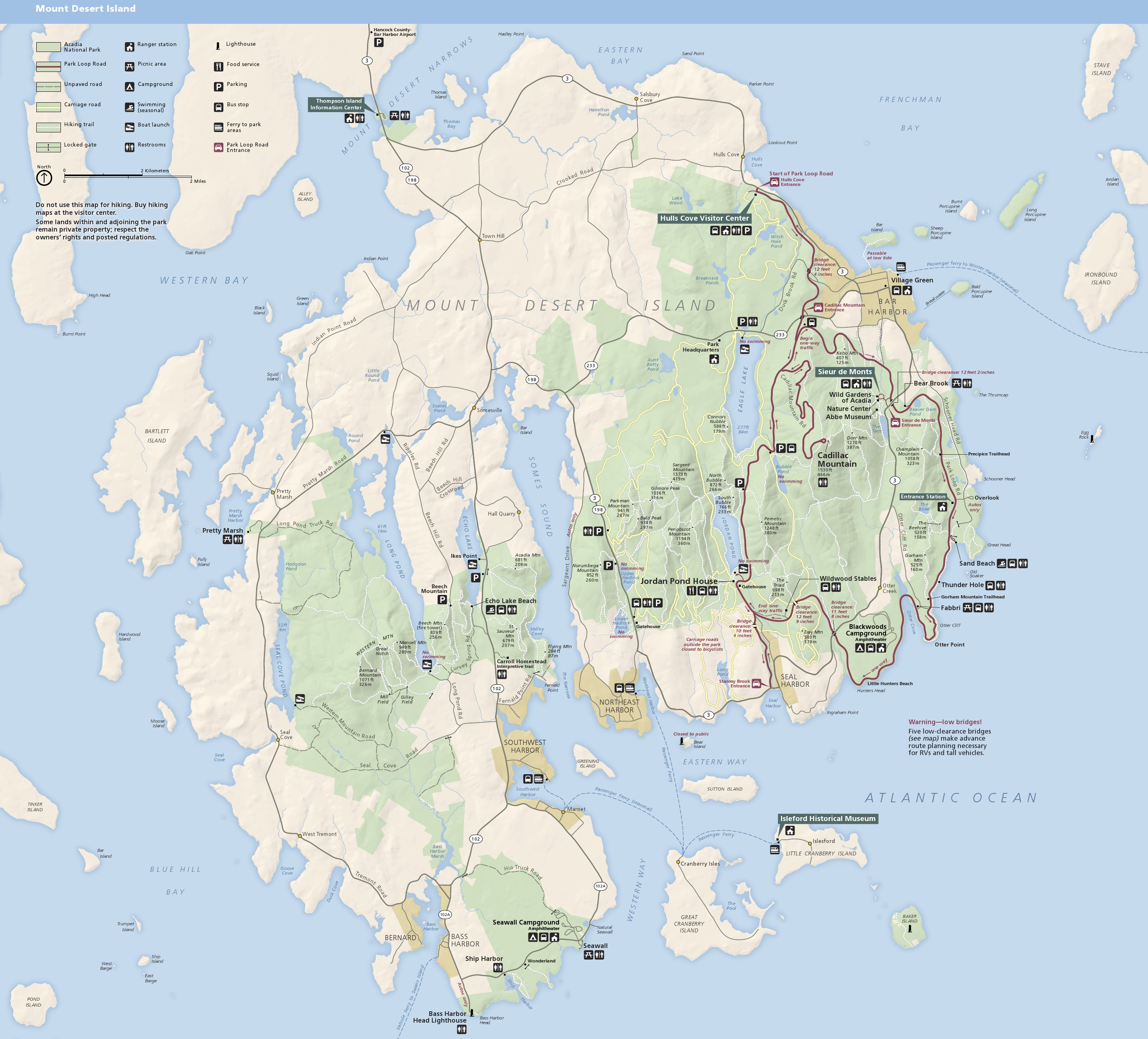
Mount Desert Island map

In 1901, George B. Dorr, disturbed by the growing development of the Bar Harbor area and the dangers he foresaw in the newly invented gasoline-powered portable sawmill, established along with others the Hancock County Trustees of Public Reservations. The corporation, whose sole purpose was to preserve land for the perpetual use of the public, acquired 6,000 acres (24 km^{2}) by 1913. Dorr offered the land to the federal government, and in 1916, President Wilson announced the creation of Sieur de Monts National Monument. Dorr continued to acquire property and renewed his efforts to obtain full national park status for his beloved preserve. In 1919, President Woodrow Wilson signed the act establishing Lafayette National Park, the first national park east of the Mississippi. Dorr, whose labors constituted "the greatest of one-man shows in the history of land conservation", became the first park superintendent. In 1929, the park name was changed to Acadia National Park.

John D. Rockefeller Jr. endowed the park with a third of its land area, 10,700 acres. Like many rusticators, Rockefeller, whose family fortune was derived from the petroleum industry, wanted to keep the island free of automobiles, but local governments allowed the entry of automobiles on the island's roads. Rockefeller constructed about 50 miles (80 km) of carriage roads around the eastern half of the island. These roads were closed to automobiles and included several vistas and stone bridges. About 40 miles (64 km) of these roads are within Acadia National Park and open only to hikers, bicyclists, horseback riders, horse-drawn carriages and cross country skiers.

In 1950, Marguerite Yourcenar and Grace Frick bought a house, "Petite Plaisance", in Northeast Harbor on the island. Yourcenar wrote a large part of her novel Memoires d'Hadrien on the island, and she died there in 1987. Their house is now a museum. Both ladies were cremated and their ashes are buried in the Brookside Cemetery in Somesville.

In 1969, College of the Atlantic, the island's first and only institution of higher education, was established in Bar Harbor.

In 1986, Friends of Acadia, the nonprofit organization that directs private philanthropy and volunteerism for the benefit of Acadia National Park, was founded.

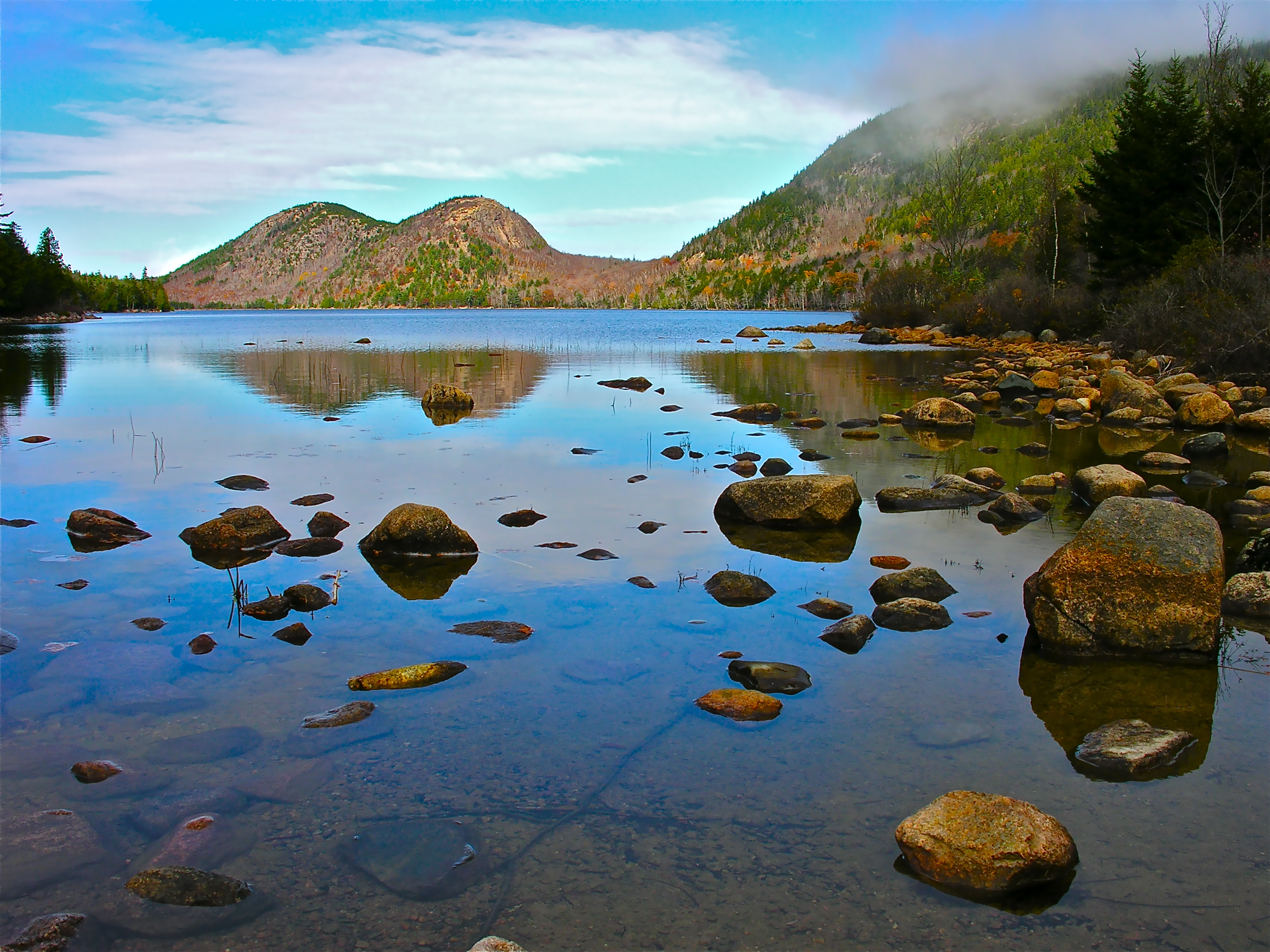
Acadia National Park

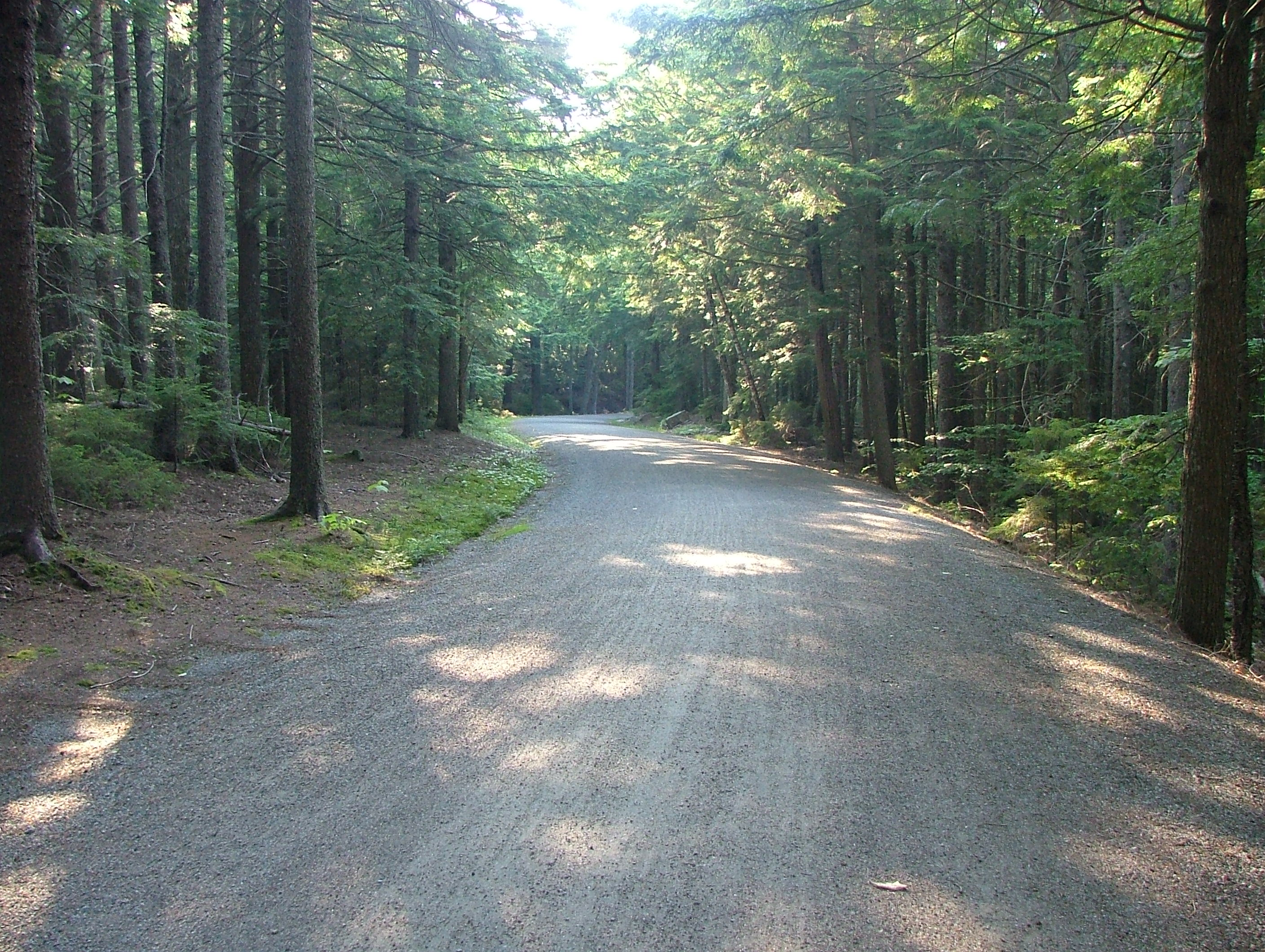
An Acadia carriage road

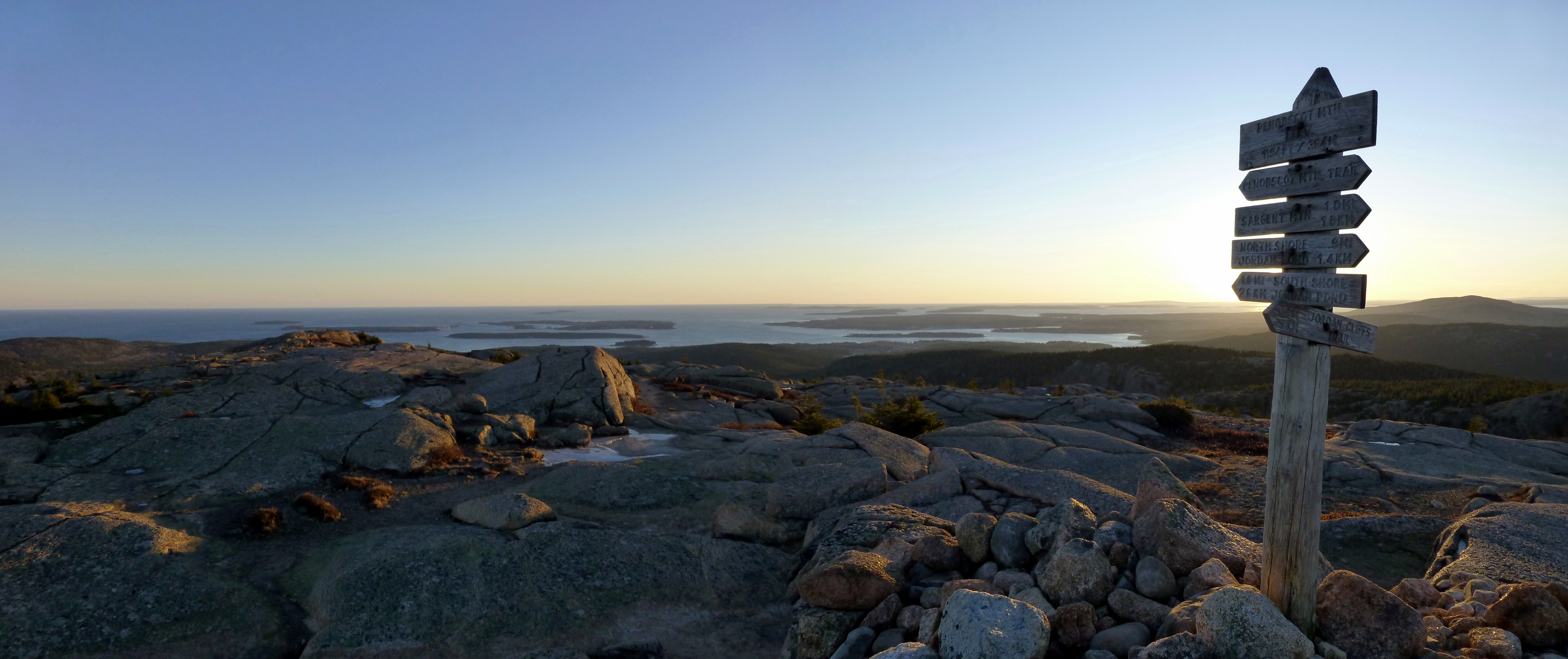
View from the summit of Mt. Penobscot
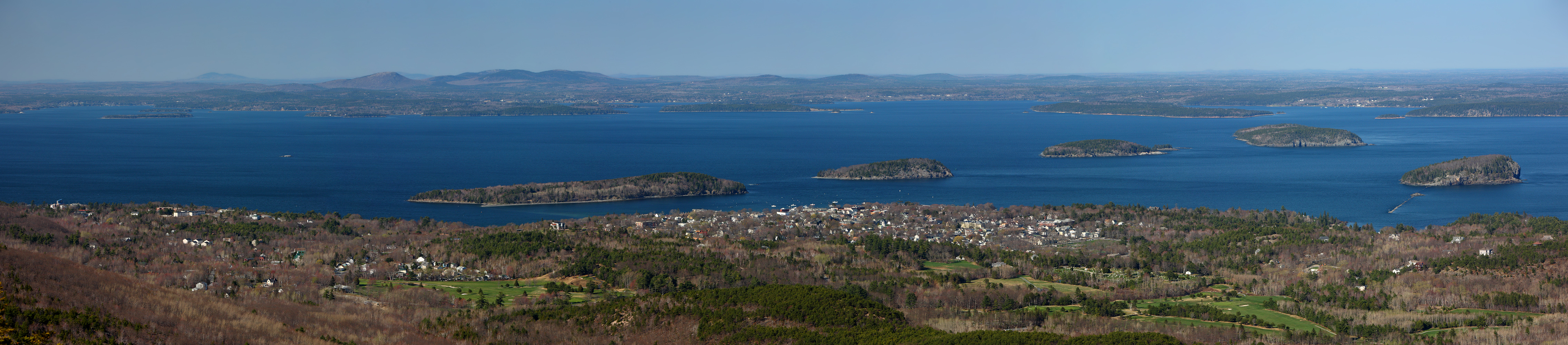
Frenchman Bay and Porcupine Islands around the town of Bar Harbor viewed from Cadillac Mountain on Mount Desert Island

== Geology ==
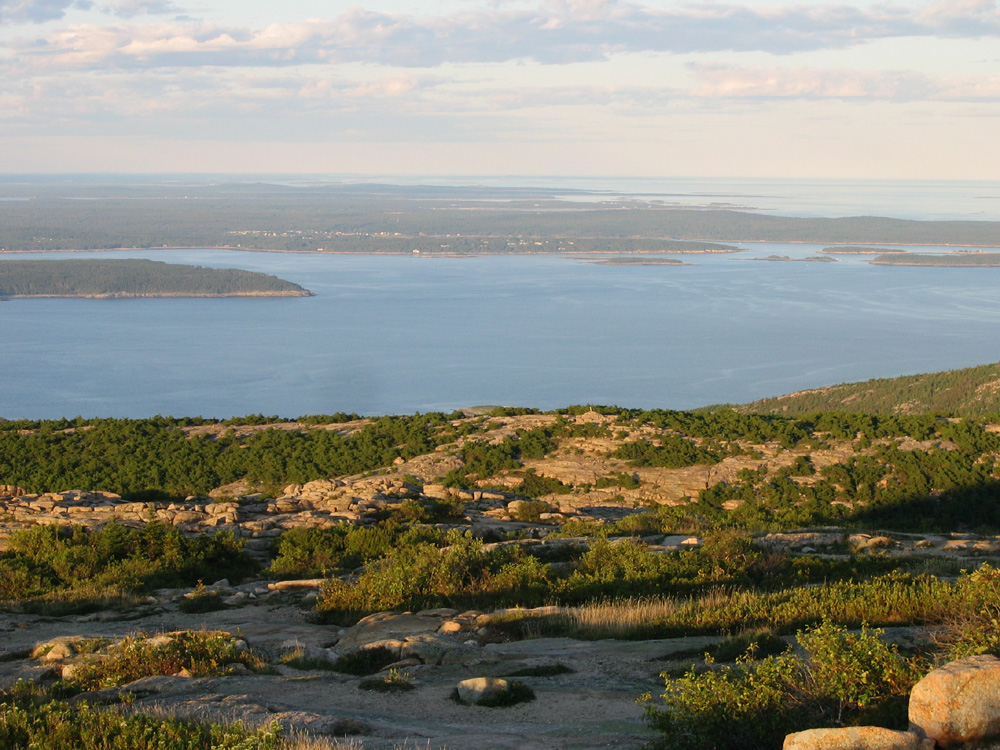
View atop Cadillac Mountain

Mount Desert Island is rich in geological history dating back about 550 million years. The earliest formation on the island is the Ellsworth Schist Formation, which was a sea-floor mud deposit created during the Cambrian period by volcanic ash. During the Ordovician period, the Acadian orogeny — the collision of Laurentia, Gondwanaland, and Avalonia — caused the formation to fold, thrust, and lift above sea level, where later layers were eroded away and the schist was exposed. The Bar Harbor Formation, which is made up predominantly of sands and silts, and Cranberry Island Formation, made up from volcanic ash and magmatic debris, occurred under similar circumstances in the Silurian and Devonian periods, and were deposited on top of the Ellsworth Schist. However, due to less tectonic activity at that time, their deformation was less severe.

Quarrying of granite was historically an important industry. Orogenic activity during the Devonian period gave Mount Desert Island three granite units: the Cadillac Mountain granite, the fine-grained Somesville granite, and the medium-grained Somesville granite. Surrounding these granites (labeled "DCg" on geologic maps) is a zone of brecciated material, known as DSz (Devonian Shatter Zone).

Most recently, Mount Desert Island was host to the Laurentide Ice Sheet as it extended and receded during the Pleistocene epoch. The glacier left visible marks upon the landscape, such as Bubble Rock, a glacial erratic carried 19 miles (31 km) by the ice sheet from a Lucerne granite outcrop and deposited precariously on the side of South Bubble Mountain in Acadia National Park. Other examples are the moraines deposited at the southern ends of many of the glacier-carved valleys on the Island such as the Jordan Pond valley, indicating the extent of the glacier; and the beach sediments in a regressional sequence beneath and around Jordan Pond, indicating the rebound of the continent after the glacier's recession about 25,000 years ago.

The area around Somes Sound was originally categorized as a fjord and was the only one on the East Coast of North America. It has since been recategorized as a fjard due to the lack of an area of de-oxygenated water (dead zone), as well as the fact that the mountains on either side of the sound are not as steep as is typically expected with a fjord.

== Ecology ==
Excavations of old Indian sites in the Mount Desert Island region have yielded remains of the native mammals. Bones of wolf, North American beaver (Castor canadensis), deer, elk, gray seal (Halichoerus grypus), "Indian dog", and sea mink (Neogale macrodon) have been uncovered, as well as large numbers of raccoon, lynx, muskrat, and deer. Although beaver were trapped to extinction on the island, two pairs of beaver that were released in 1920 by George B. Dorr at the brook between Bubble Pond and Eagle Lake and their descendants have repopulated it. A large fire in 1947 cleared the eastern half of the island of its coniferous trees and permitted the growth of aspen, birch, alder, maple and other deciduous trees which enabled the beaver to thrive.

== Art ==
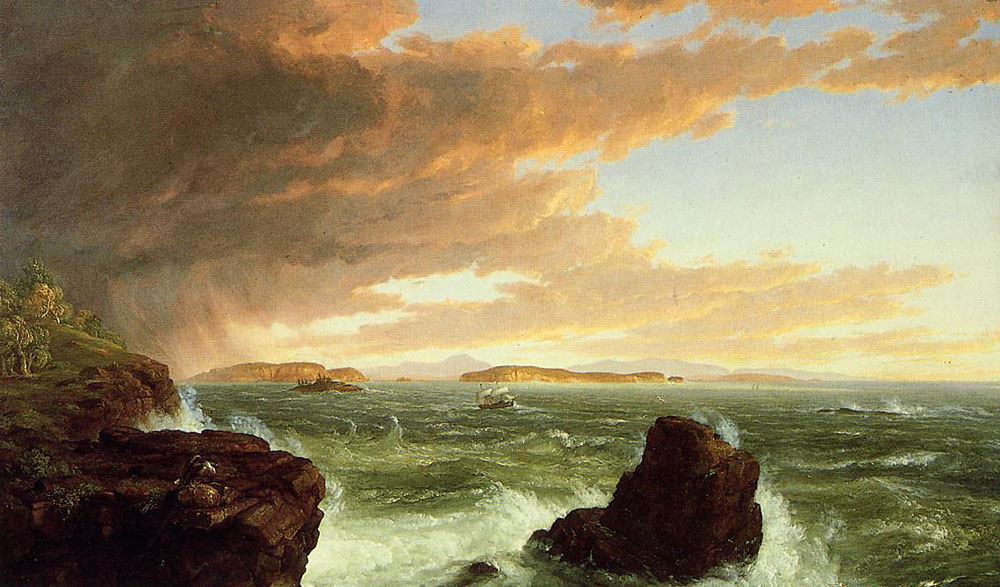
View Across Frenchman's Bay from Mount Desert Island After a Squall (1845) by Thomas Cole

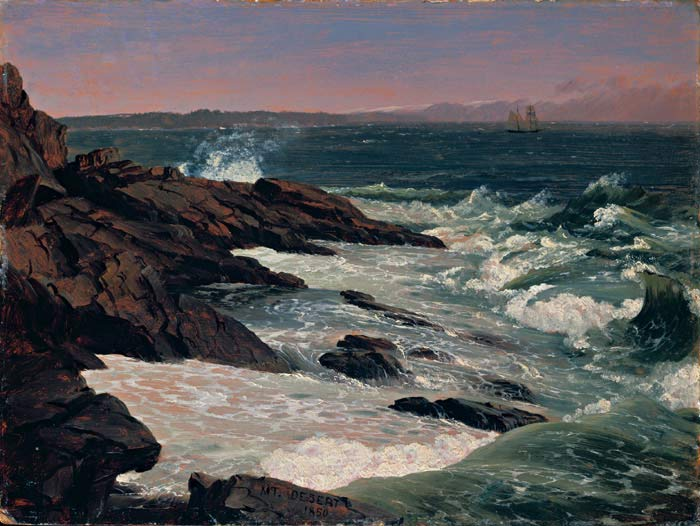
Fog off Mount Desert (1850) by Frederic Edwin Church

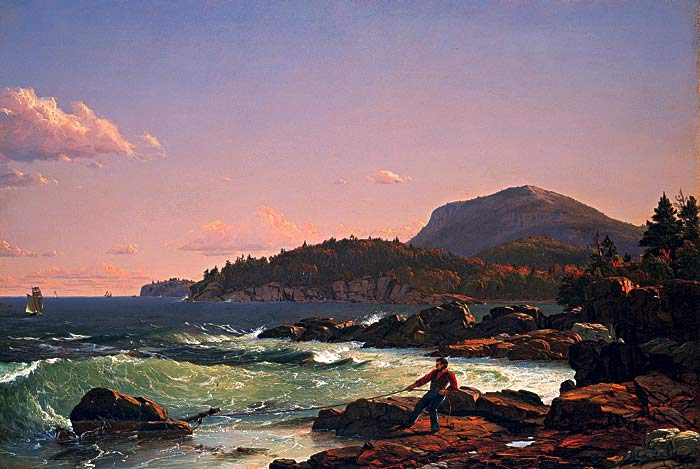
Newport Mountain, Mount Desert (1851) by Frederic Edwin Church

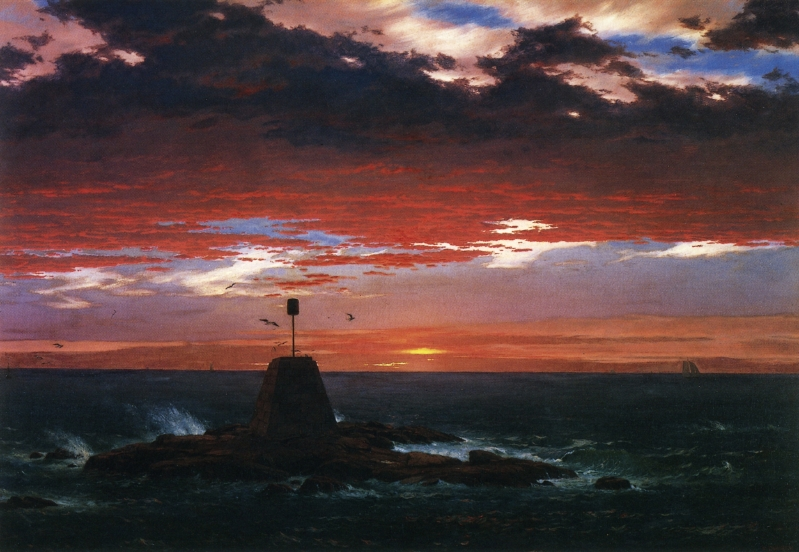
Beacon, off Mount Desert Island (1851) by Frederic Edwin Church

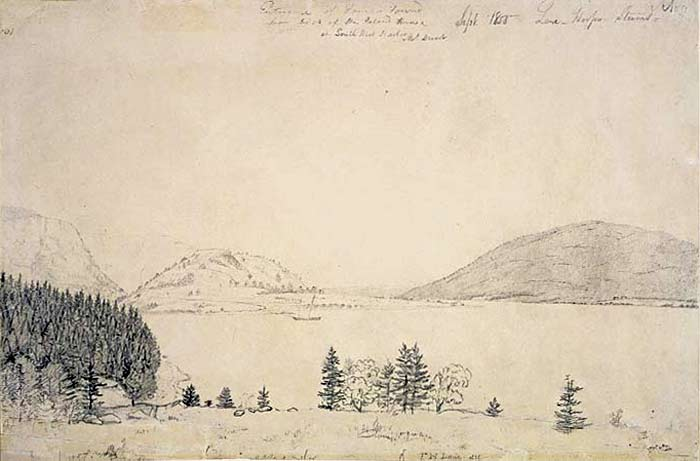
Entrance of Somes Sound, Mount Desert, Maine (1855) by Fitz Henry Lane

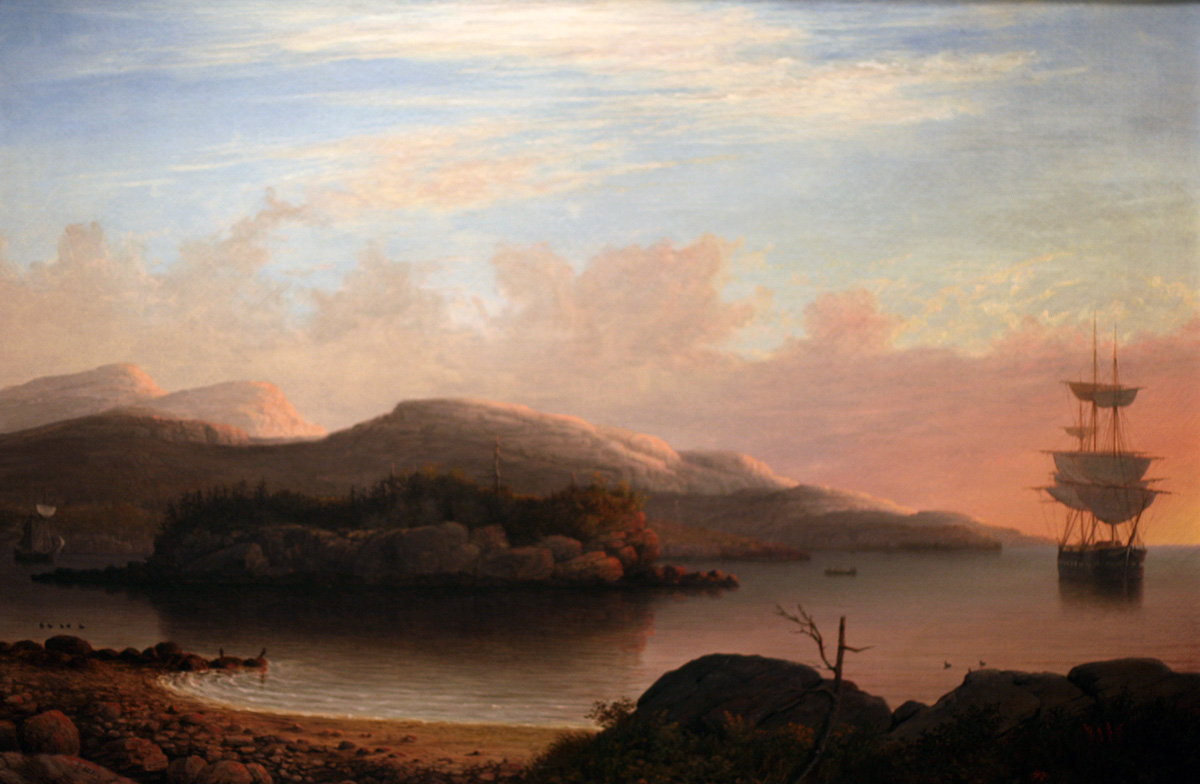
Off Mount Desert Island (1856) by Fitz Henry Lane

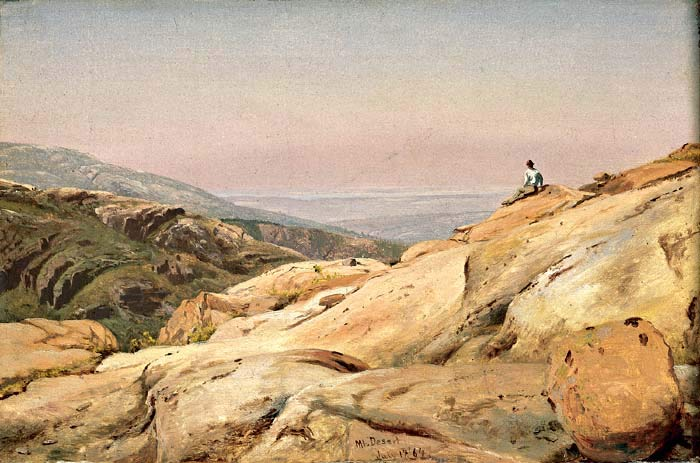
Mount Desert Island, Maine (1864) by Jervis McEntee

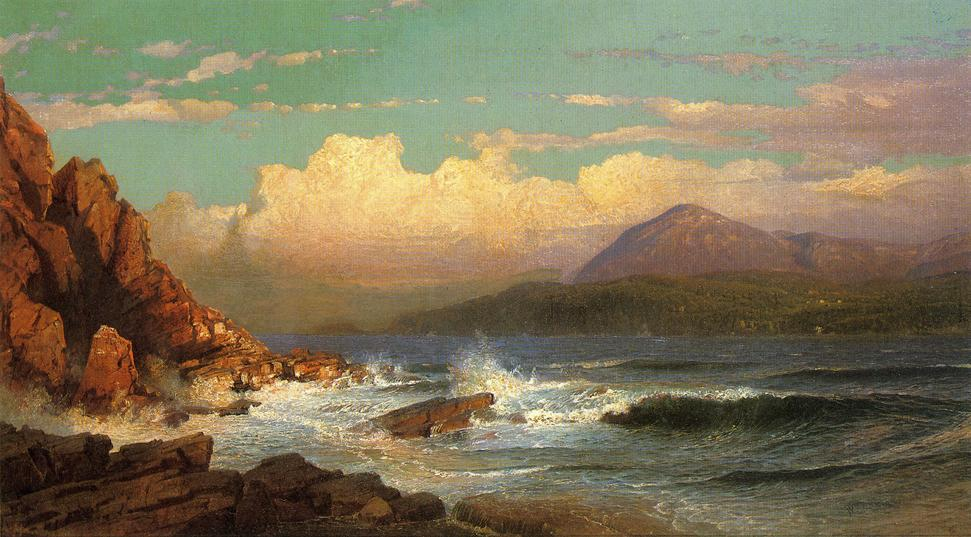
Mt. Desert, Maine (1866) by William Trost Richards

== Transport ==
The Island Explorer provides seasonal bus service on and near the island, largely to serve visitors to Acadia.

== See also ==
- Acadia National Park
- List of islands of Maine
- Otter Cliffs Radio Station
