= Abraham Somes =

American settler

- Born: March 14, 1732
- Died: September 7, 1819 (aged 87)
- Known for: Settlements on Mount Desert Island

Abraham Somes (March 14, 1732 – September 7, 1819) was an American soldier and pioneer who was the primary founder of settlements on the scenic Mount Desert Island, which is now part of Acadia National Park in present-day Maine.

== Personal life ==
In 1761, Somes, a cooper by trade, brought his wife (Hannah Herrick) and family from Gloucester, Massachusetts, to the island, along with James Richardson and Richardson's family. Somes obtained the land for development on grants from Francis Bernard, the governor of Massachusetts; who, in 1761, still maintained an interest in securing the property for the Crown.

Somes chose to establish a village at the north end of the fjard which cuts through the center of the island. It would later be named after him as Somes Sound, and it is the only natural fjard on the east coast of the United States. Abraham named his settlement Somesville and it would develop into an important trading location that largely allowed for the rest of the island to be permanently colonized in the years following the American Revolutionary War.

During the American Revolution, Abraham Somes served as a 1st Lieutenant in Ezra Young's 7 Co., 6 Lincoln Co., regiment of the Massachusetts militia. He also served in Capt. Daniel Sullivan's Company of Volunteers in 1779.

After fulfilling his duty in the military, Abraham returned to Somesville, where he lived out his days. He had 13 children.

== Death ==
Somes died on September 7, 1819, aged 87. He is interred in Brookside Cemetery in Mount Desert, Maine, as are both of his wives.
