= John Johnston (chemist) =

Scottish chemist

John Johnston (October 13, 1881 – September 12, 1950) was a Scottish-born American chemist.

== Early life ==
A native of Perth, Scotland, Johnston was born on October 13, 1881.

He earned a bachelor's of science degree in 1903 and a doctor of science in 1908. From 1903 to 1905, Johnston's studies at St. Andrews University were funded by the Carnegie Scholarship.

== Career ==
Johnston began working at the Massachusetts Institute of Technology in 1907, leaving the next year for a position at the Geophysical Laboratory at the Carnegie Institution for Science. In 1916, Johnston became head of research for the American Zinc, Lead and Smelting Company, subsequently moving to the U.S. Bureau of Mines in 1917, and the National Research Council in 1918. He taught at Yale University starting in 1919.

From 1920, Johnston served as the school's first Sterling Professor. He resigned the position in 1927, returning to industry as head of research for the U.S. Steel Corporation. He was a member of several scientific societies, serving on the editorial board of the American Chemical Society from 1914 to 1923, and as councilor in 1936. Johnston also led the Electrochemical Society as president between 1934 and 1935.

Johnston retired from U.S. Steel in 1946 and relocated to Southwest Harbor, Maine, where one of his sons lived.

== Personal life ==
Johnston married Dorothy Hopkins, with whom he had a daughter and two sons.

== Death ==
Johnston died in 1950, aged 68. He is interred in Mount Height Cemetery in Southwest Harbor, Maine. His wife survived him by three years, and was buried beside him.
