= Agnes Newhall Stillwell =

American archaeologist

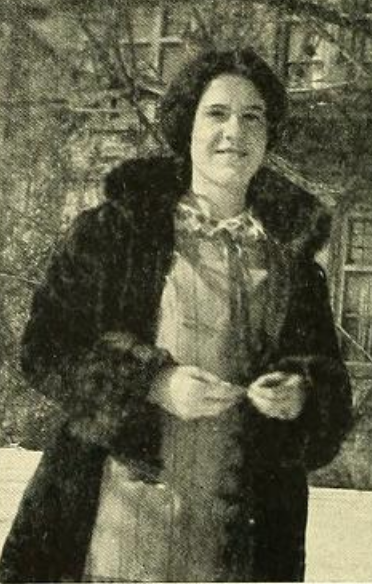
- Agnes Newhall Stillwell, from the 1927 yearbook of Bryn Mawr College
- Born: Agnes Ellen Milan; March 4, 1906; Southwest Harbor, Maine, U.S.
- Died: April 8, 1957 (aged 51); Princeton, New Jersey, U.S.
- Occupation: Archaeologist
- Spouse: Richard Stillwell

Agnes Ellen Newhall Stillwell (March 4, 1906 – April 8, 1957) was an American archaeologist, focused on Corinth.

== Early life and education ==
Newhall was born Agnes Ellen Milan in Southwest Harbor, Maine. Agnes was partly raised by an aunt, educator Laura L. Newhall, in Boston. Agnes was described as a niece of Millie Milan and her older sister Hattie Hamblen, when both women died on the same day, in Maine in 1932.

Newhall graduated from Bryn Mawr College in 1927, and pursued graduate studies on a fellowship at the American School of Classical Studies at Athens, where she was based until 1935.

== Career ==
Stillwell moved to Princeton, New Jersey, because her husband was a professor there. She continued working alongside her husband in Greece, and writing scholarly articles. Her inventories from excavating at Corinth continued to inform other scholars' work.

== Publications ==
- "Eighth Century B.C. Inscriptions from Corinth" (1933)
- The Potter’s Quarter (1948, with Jack Leonard Benson)
- The Potter’s Quarter: The Terracottas (1952)

== Personal life and legacy ==
Agnes Newhall married Richard Stillwell, head of the American School of Classical Studies at Athens, in London in 1932. They had two children, Richard and Theodora. Richard became a chemist, and Theodora followed her parents in doing archaeological work at Corinth. Agnes Newhall Stillwell died in 1957, at the age of 51, in Princeton. Her granddaughter Camilla MacKay is also an archaeologist by training.
