= Somes Sound =

Body of water in the United States

Coordinates: 44°19′15″N 68°18′30″W

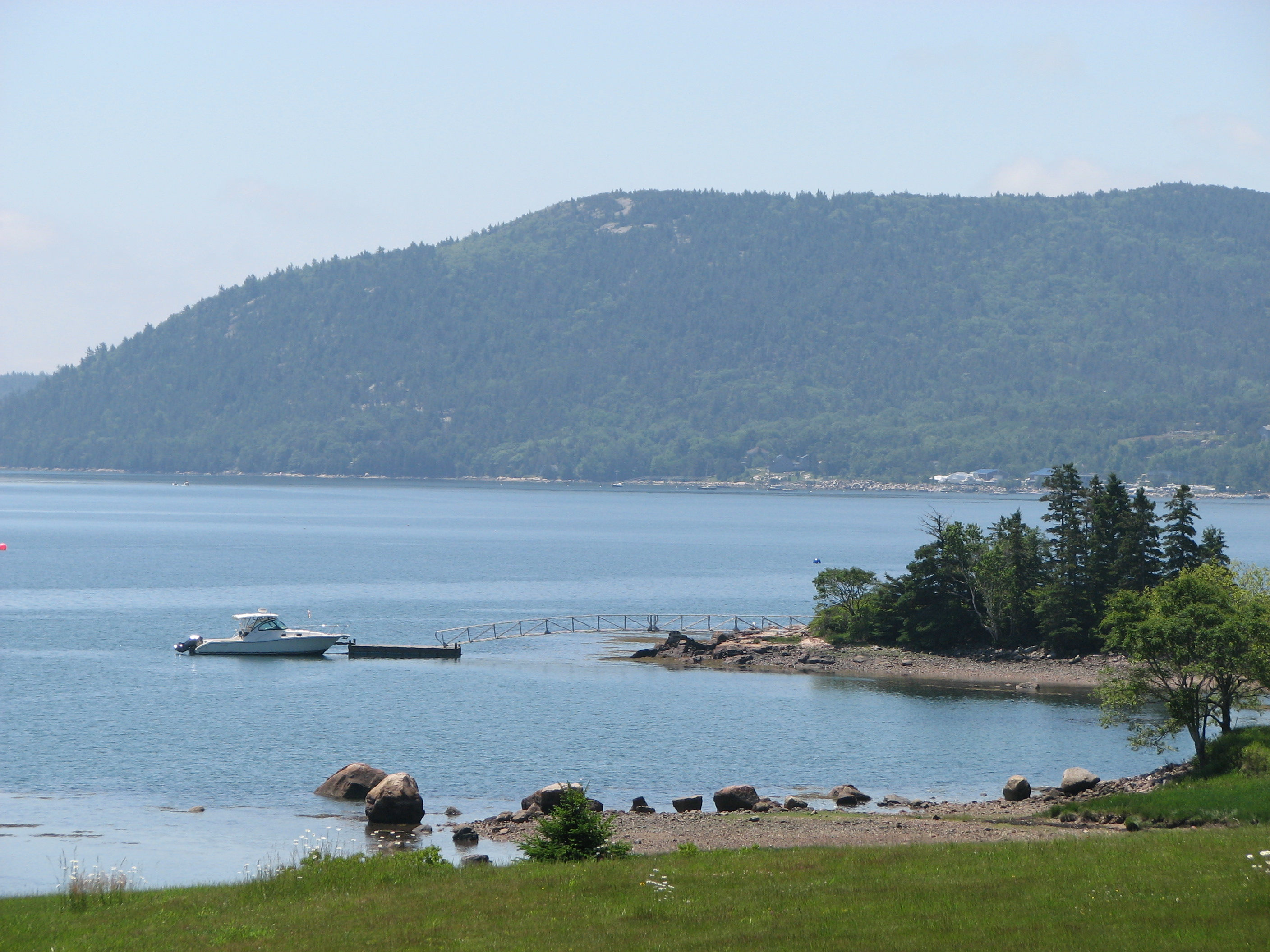
Somes Sound from Mount Desert Island

Somes Sound is a fjard running deep into Mount Desert Island, the main site of Acadia National Park in Maine, United States. Its deepest point is approximately 175 feet (50 m), and it is over 100 feet (30 m) deep in several places. The sound almost splits the island in two.

While often described as the "only fjord on the East Coast", it lacks the extreme vertical relief and anoxic sediments associated with Norwegian fjords, and is now called a fjard by officials — a smaller drowned glacial embayment.

Somes Sound was named for Abraham Somes, who was one of the first settlers on the island and had a home at the end of the sound in Somesville, the first village on the island.

== Gallery ==
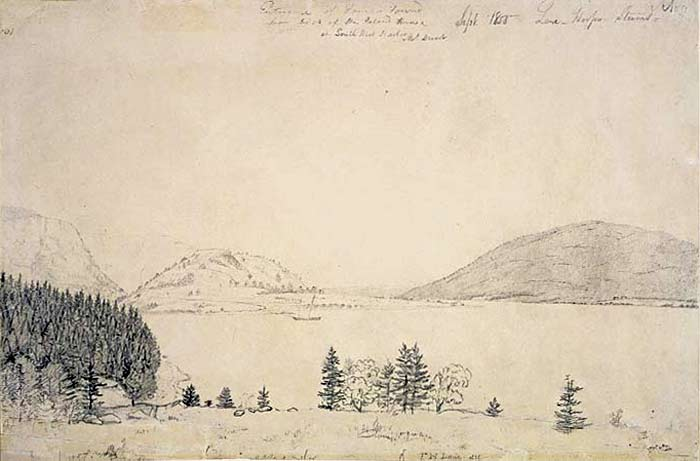
Entrance of Somes Sound
Mount Desert Island, Maine (1855), by Fitz Hugh Lane

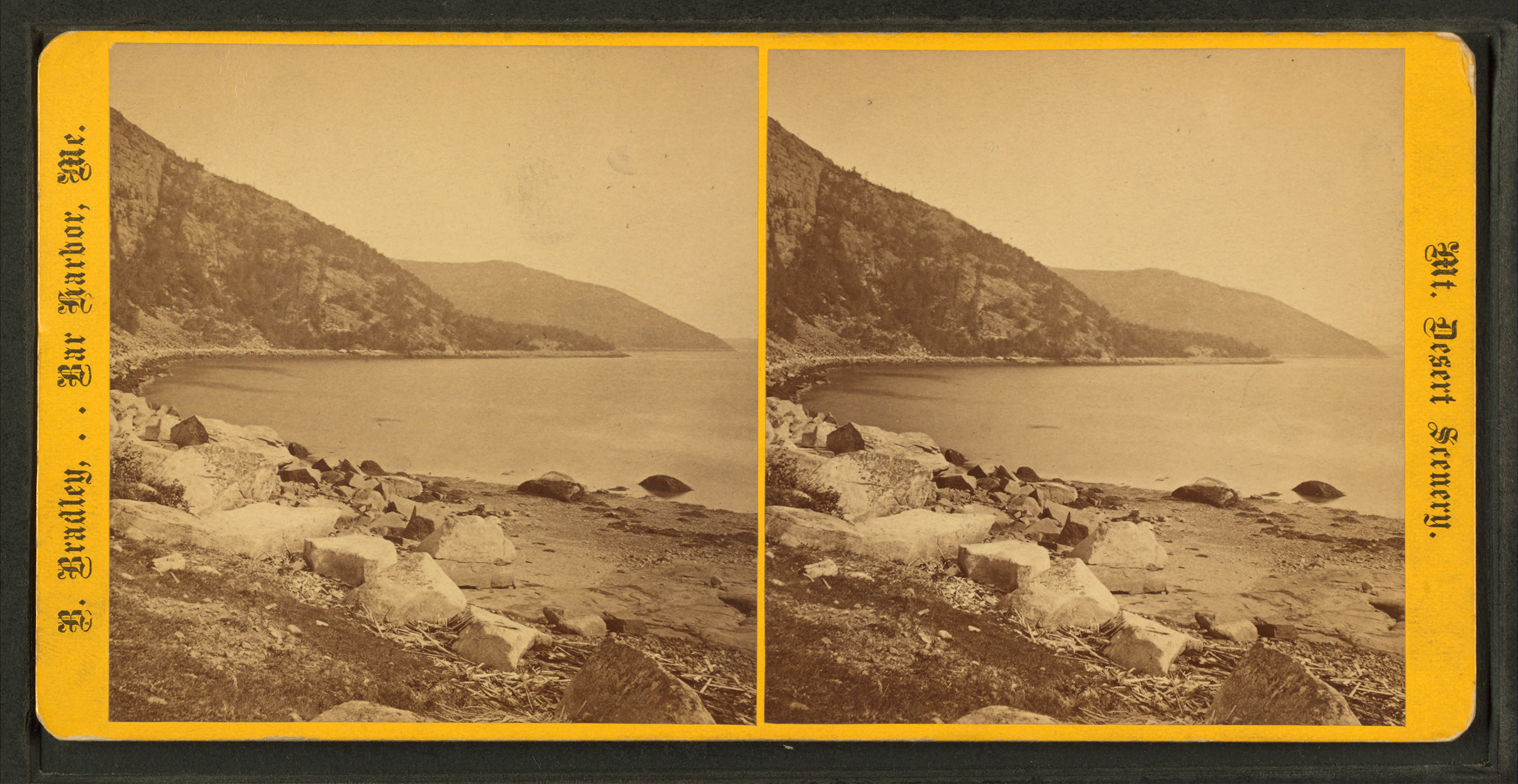
Stereoscopic image of Valley Cove, Somes Sound. (1870s)
