= Fjard =

Glacially formed, broad, shallow inlet

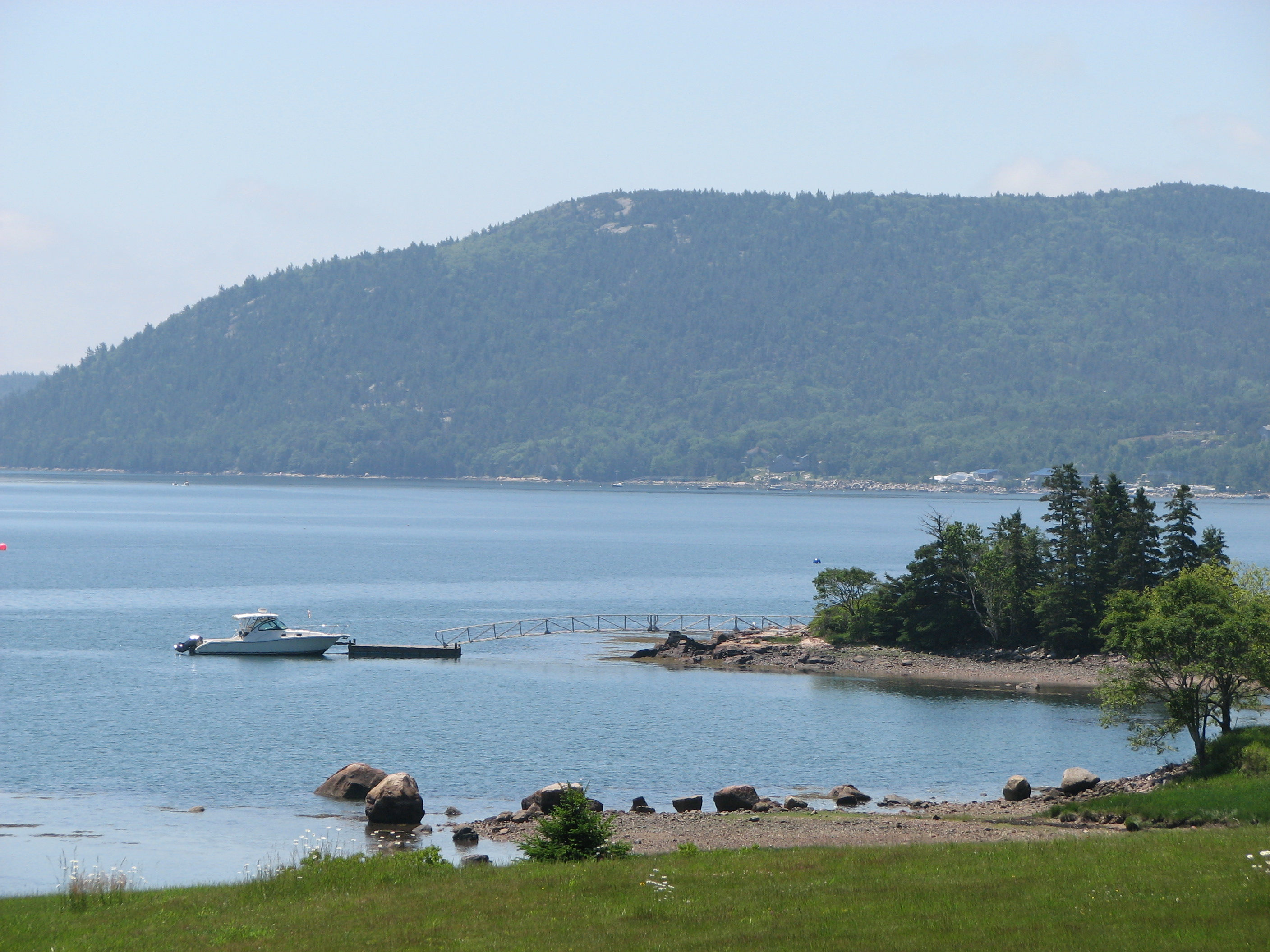
The fjard of Somes Sound, Maine, USA.

A fjard (Swedish: fjärd, IPA: [ˈfjæːɖ]) is a broad, shallow inlet formed by receding glaciers. Fjard and fjord were originally the same word, and they generally meant sailable waterway. In Scandinavia, fjords dominate along the North Sea coast while fjards dominate the Baltic Sea coast. The Swedish word fjärd is also used in reference to lake-like sections of rivers and large open areas of water between parts of an archipelago or part of an archipelago and the mainland.

== Fjards vs. fjords vs. förden vs. rias ==
Although fjards and fjords are similar in that they are a glacially formed topography, they still differ in some key ways:

- Fjords are characterized by steep high relief cliffs carved by glacial activity and often have split or branching channels.
- Fjards are glacial depressions or valleys that have much lower reliefs than fjords. Fjards fill with eroded local materials which assist in "filling", along with rising sea levels since the last ice age contributing as well. Other low relief landforms that are only associated with fjards, such as mud flats, salt marshes, and flood plains, further characterize the difference between fjords and fjards.
- "Förden" of the German coast and the fjords of Danish eastern Jutland together form a third type of glacial inlet. They tend to occur along older 'beheaded' river channels and open into the tideless Baltic sea.
- Rias are drowned valleys, such as the estuaries of Thames, Severn and Humber and the firths of Tay and Forth.

== Examples ==
=== Denmark ===
- Stavns Fjord

=== Finland ===
- Airisto in the Turku Archipelago
- Kihti between the Turku Archipelago and Åland
- Porkkalanselkä west from Porkkala peninsula
- Seurasaarenselkä and Kruunuvuorenselkä in Helsinki

=== Republic of Ireland ===
- Killary Harbour on the west coast of Ireland

=== Sweden ===
- Kanholmsfjärden in the Stockholm archipelago in Sweden
- Norra Björkfjärden in lake Mälaren in Sweden

=== United Kingdom ===
==== Scotland ====
- Cree, Kirkcudbrighshire and Wigtownshire
- Firth of Clyde, Dunbartonshire
- Loch Laxford, Sutherland.
- Rough Firth, Kirkcudbrightshire
- Water of Fleet, Kirkcudbrightshire

==== Wales ====
- Alaw Estuary, Anglesey
- Pwllheli Harbour, Caernarfonshire

=== United States ===
- Somes Sound in Acadia National Park, Maine.
