= Little Long Pond (Seal Harbor, Maine) =

Large pond in Maine, United States

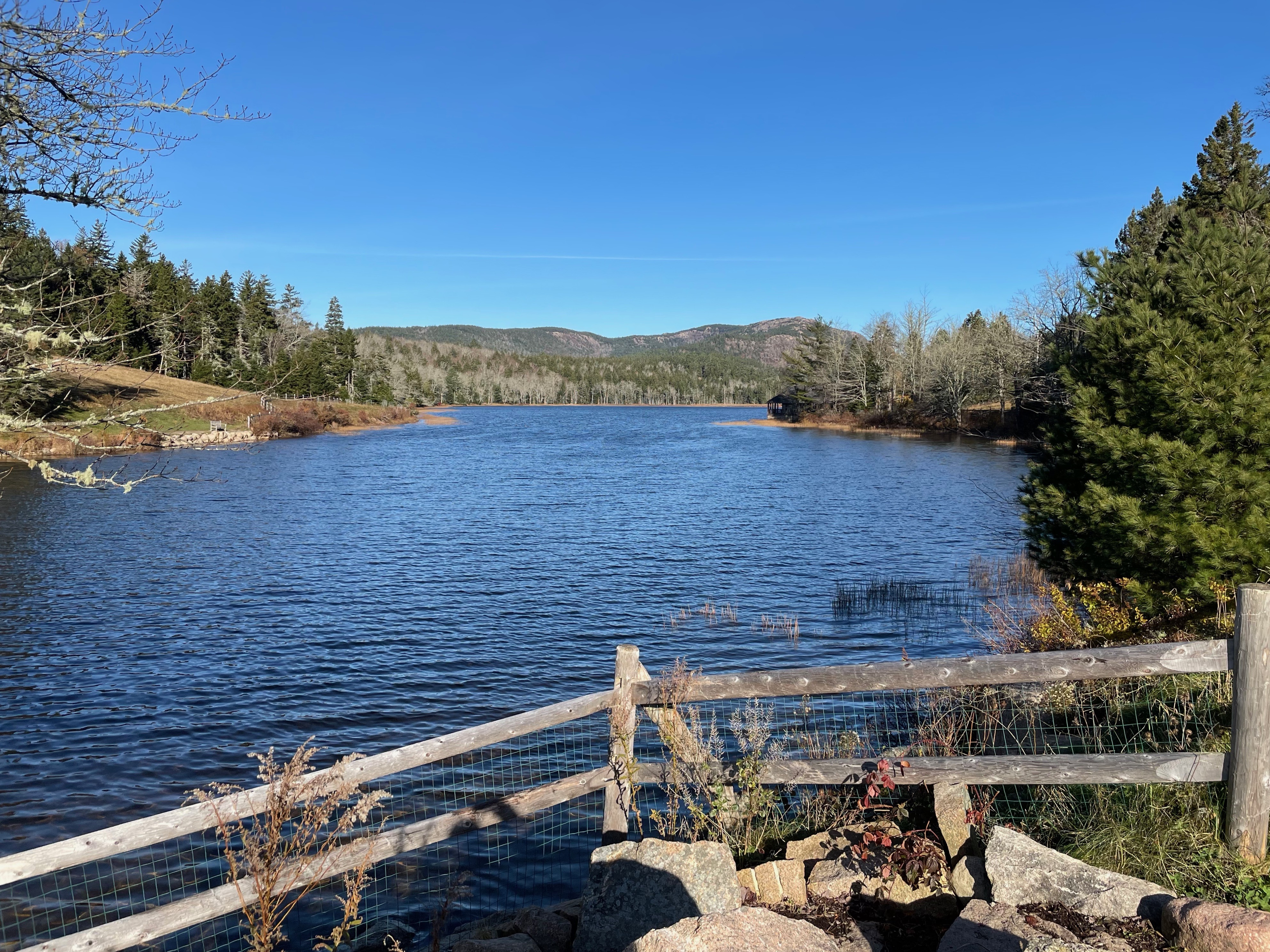
- View from the pond's southern end, at the Route 3 causeway

- Location within Maine Location within the United States
- Location: Seal Harbor, Maine, U.S.
- Coordinates: 44.29932°N 68.256511°W
- Primary inflows: Jordan Stream
- Primary outflows: Gulf of Maine
- Basin countries: United States
- Max. length: 3,500 feet (1,100 m)
- Surface area: 38 acres (15 ha)
- Average depth: 4.9 feet (1.5 m)

Little Long Pond is a pond in Seal Harbor, Maine, United States, at the southern end of Mount Desert Island. Fed by Jordan Stream, a runoff of Jordan Pond, the pond is separated from Bracy Cove at the Gulf of Maine by a narrow causeway carrying State Route 3. It is officially called Long Pond, but has been given the Little prefix to differentiate it from other Long Ponds in the area. A 2.2-mile (3.5 km) trail circumnavigates the pond, while an offshoot leads to Jordan Pond House. Mostly flat on its eastern side, it rises somewhat from the pond's northern end to around halfway down its western side.

Little Long Pond includes 17 acres of meadows, 12 acres of marsh, a bog and nearly 1,000 acres of forest. A boat house stands on the eastern shore of the pond. It is possible it was used to serve the farm of Frank Callahan, which stood near the opposite shore in the 19th and early 20th centuries. It has since been demolished.

John D. Rockefeller Jr. purchased the land around the pond for its scenic value, and built in 1914 The Eyrie, a summer house atop the hill immediately to the east of the pond. It was torn down in 1962.

The land was privately owned until 2015 when, in celebration of his 100th birthday, David Rockefeller Sr. donated it to the Land & Garden Preserve.

There is a parking space either side of the gate and along the northern side of Route 3.

== Gallery ==
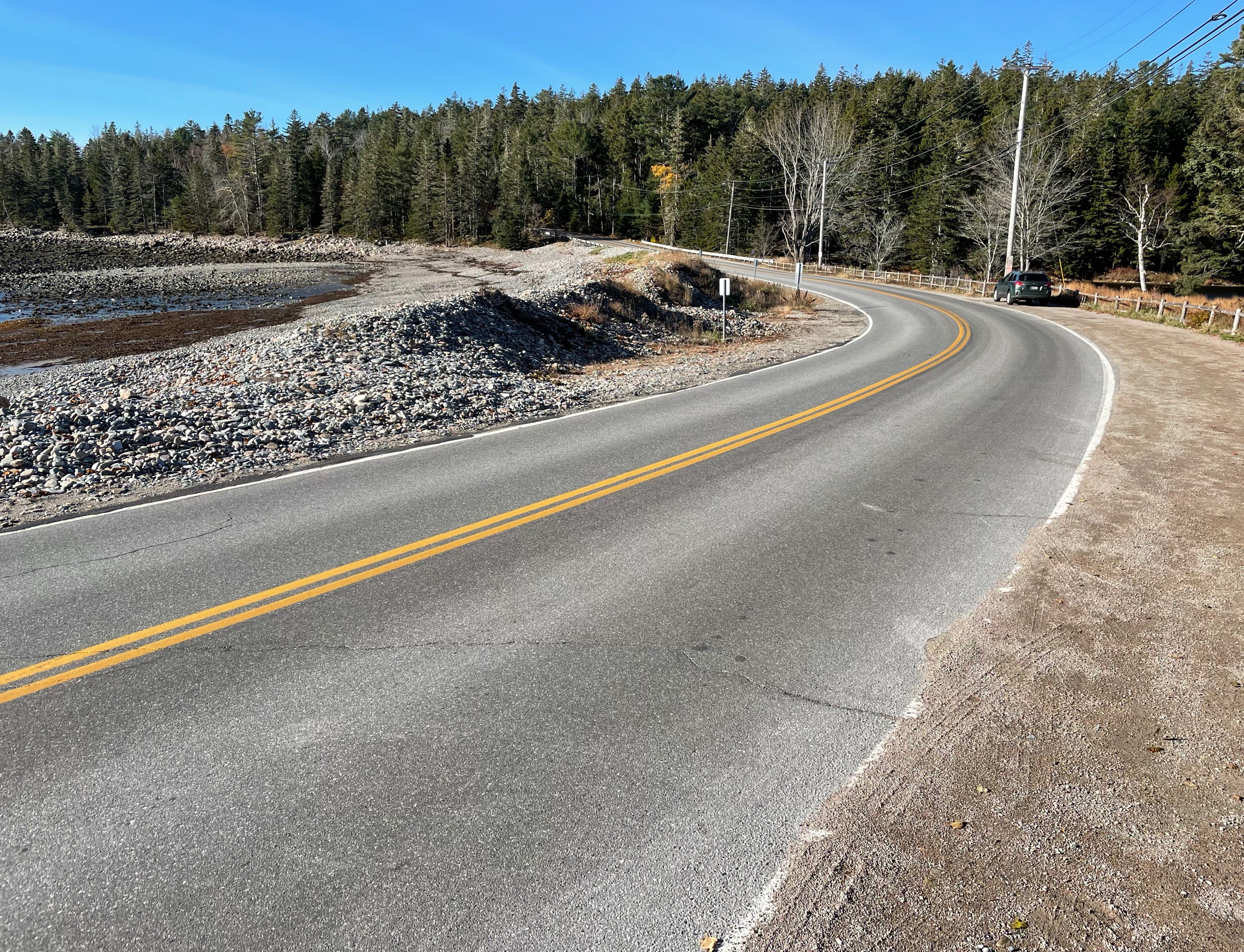
The Route 3 causeway separating Little Long Pond from Bracy Cove

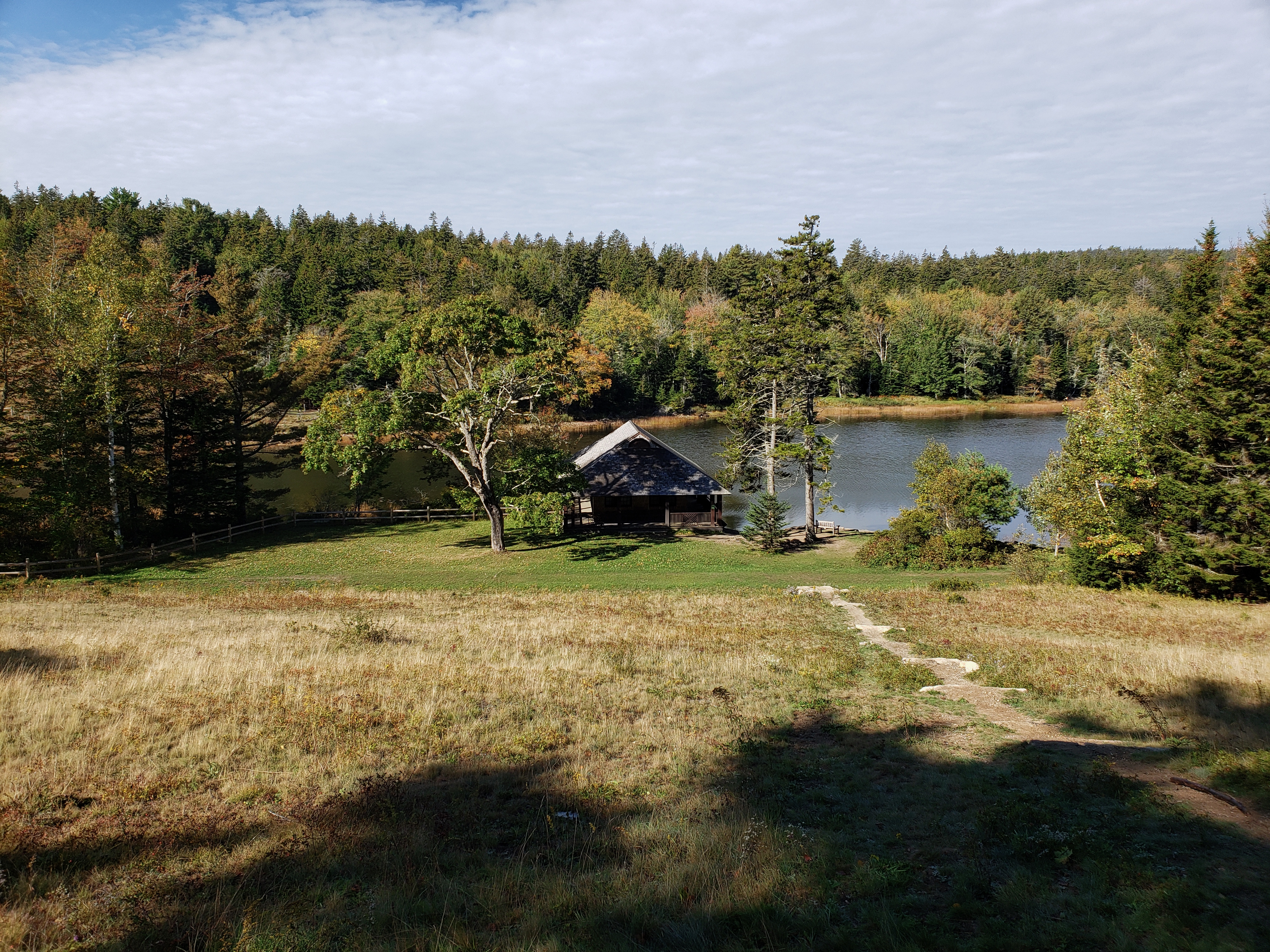
Boat house

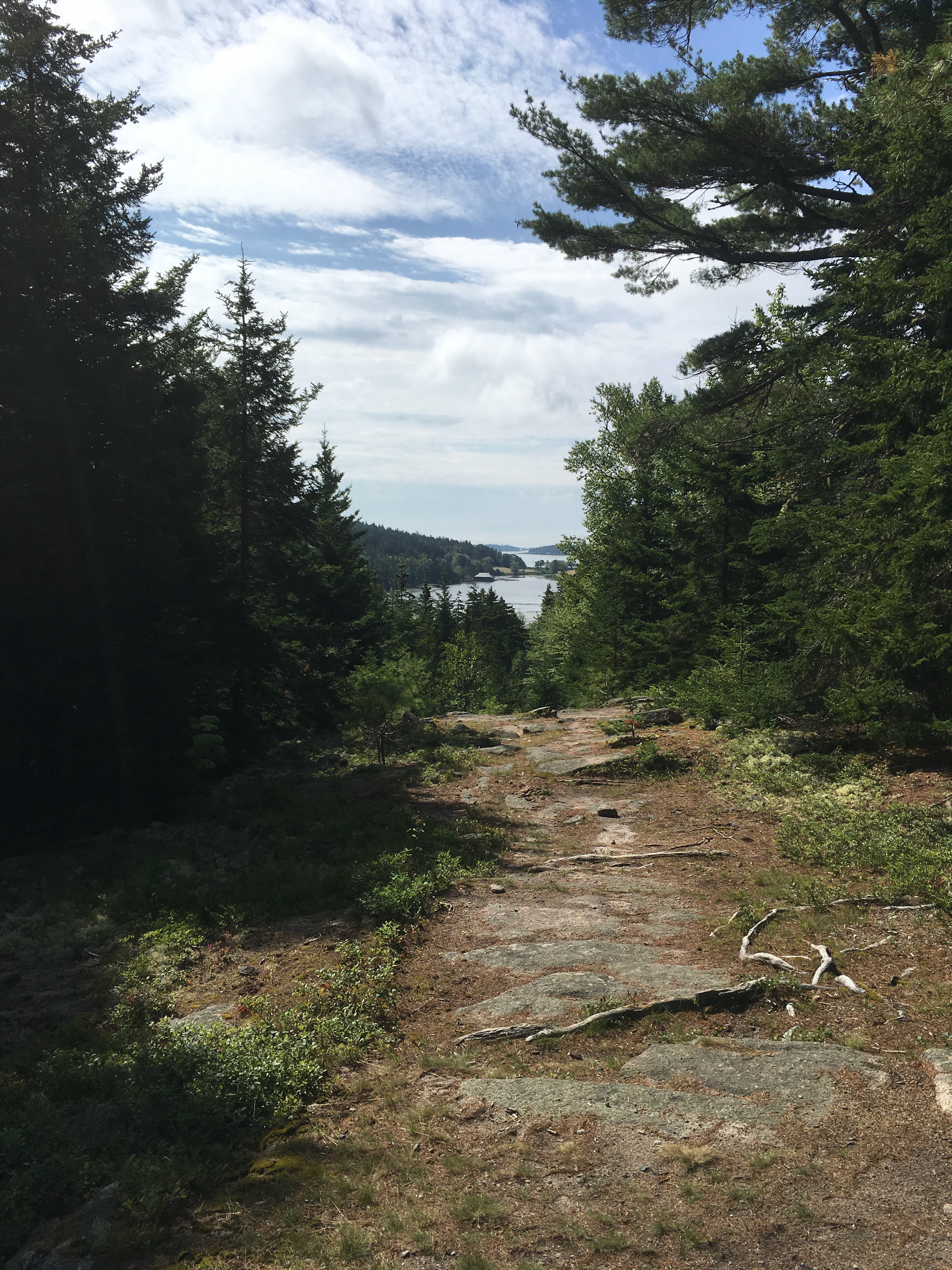
Looking back from the northern end of the pond's trail system

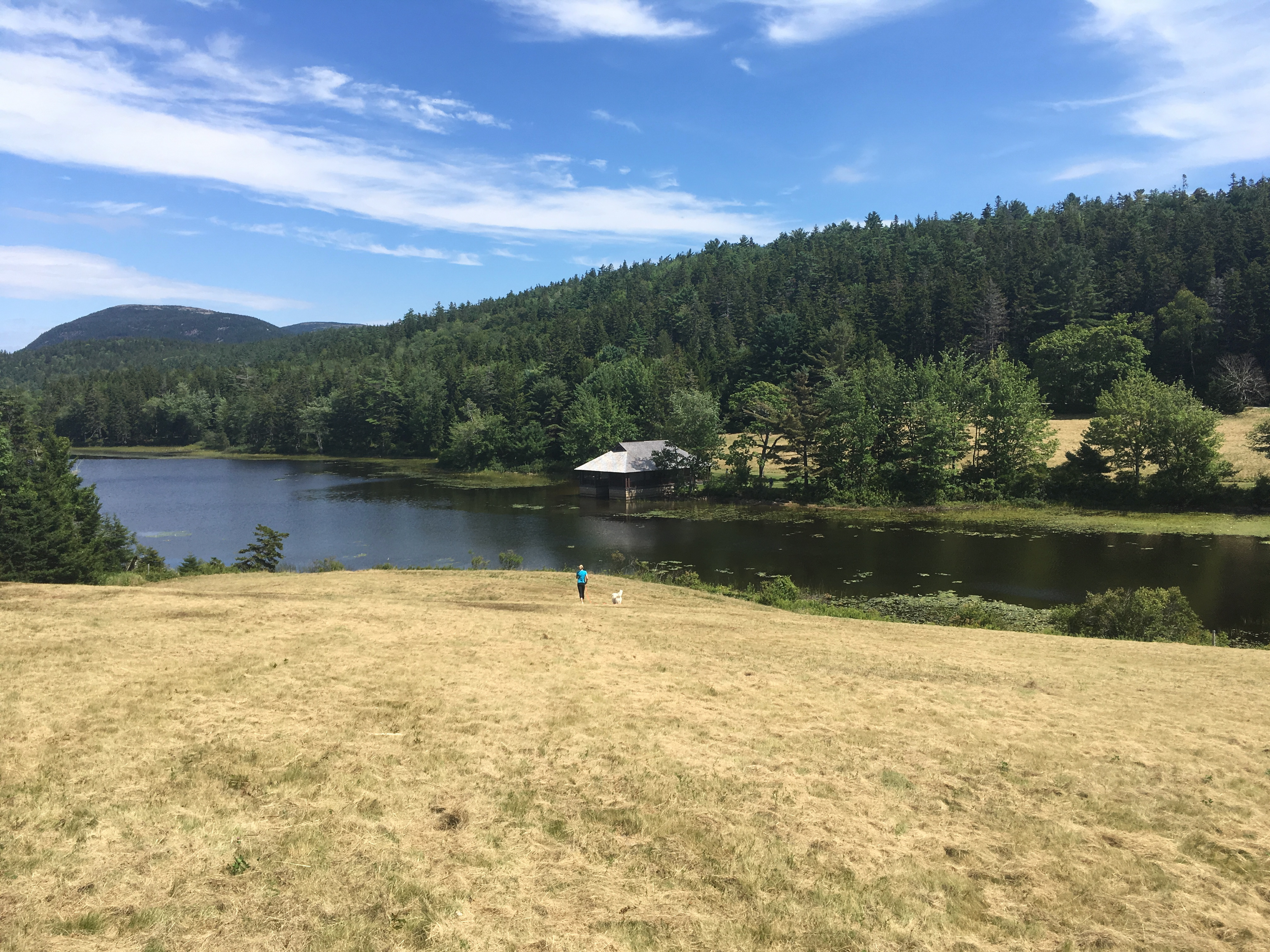
View from the former Callahan farm to the boat house

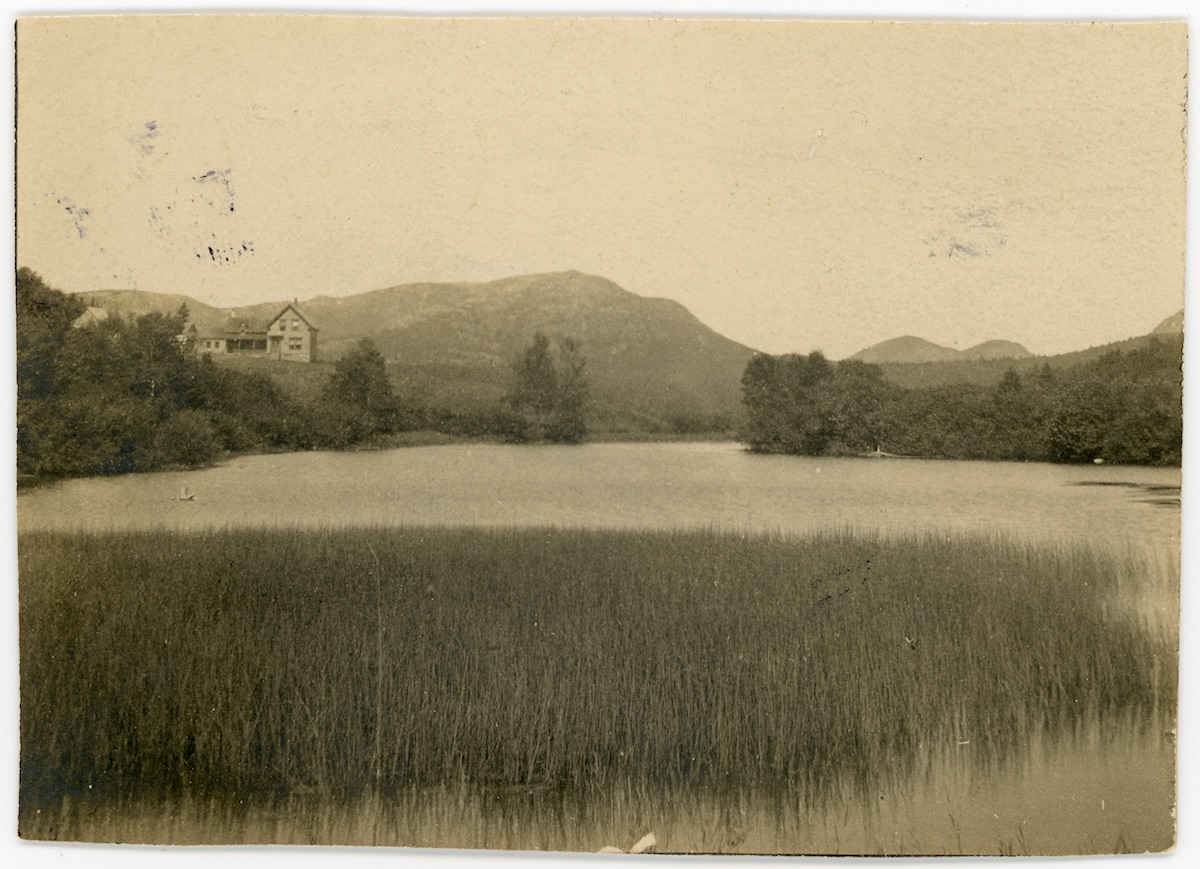
The Callahan farm house, pictured in the 1880s

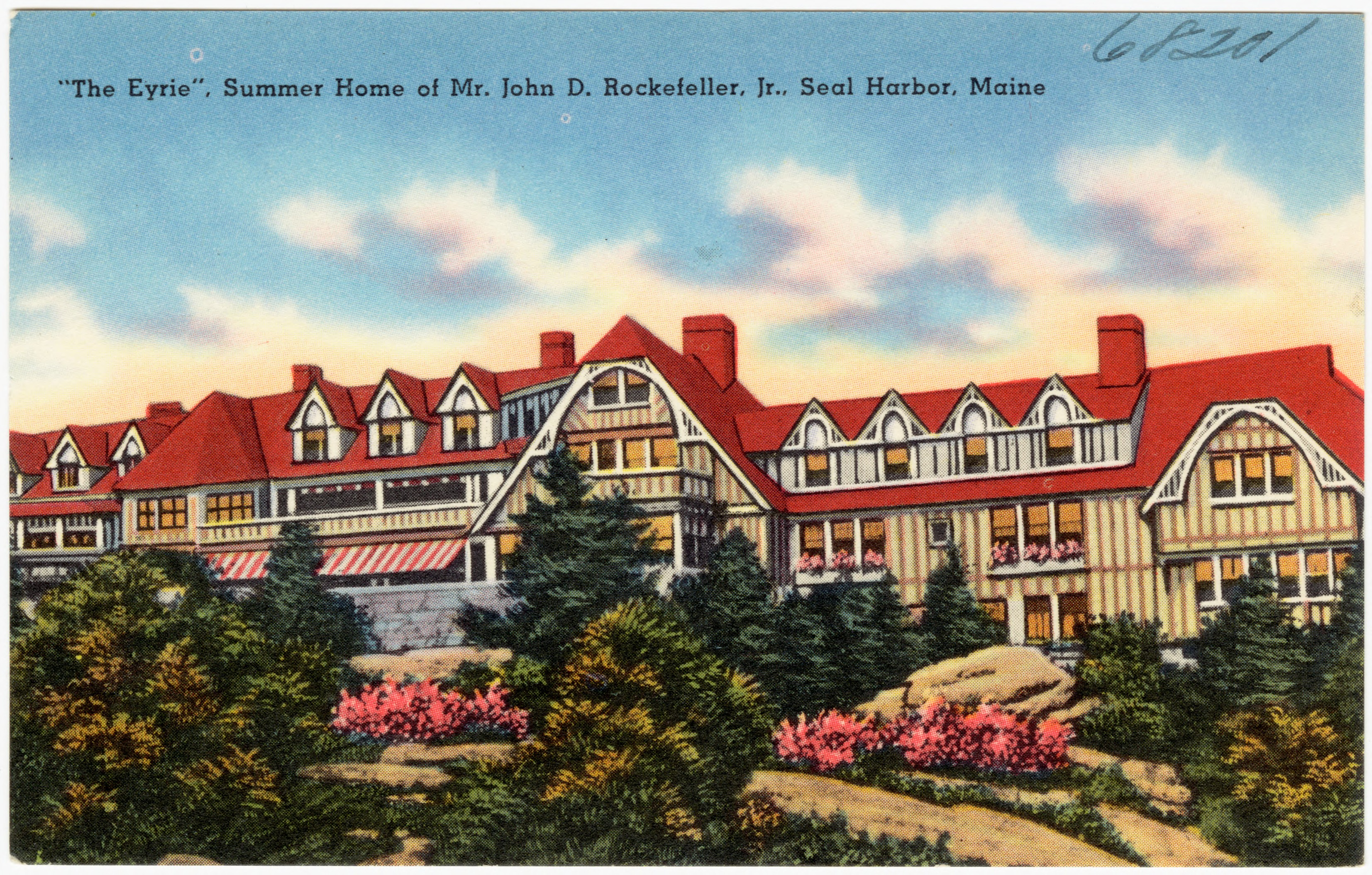
The Rockefellers' summer house, The Eyrie

== Bibliography ==
- Little Long Pond: A Field Guide to Four Seasons, Sam Eliot (2017) ISBN 9781366730916

== External references ==
- Long Pond, c. 1930 – Maine Memory
