= Wildwood Stables =

Farm on Mount Desert Island, Maine

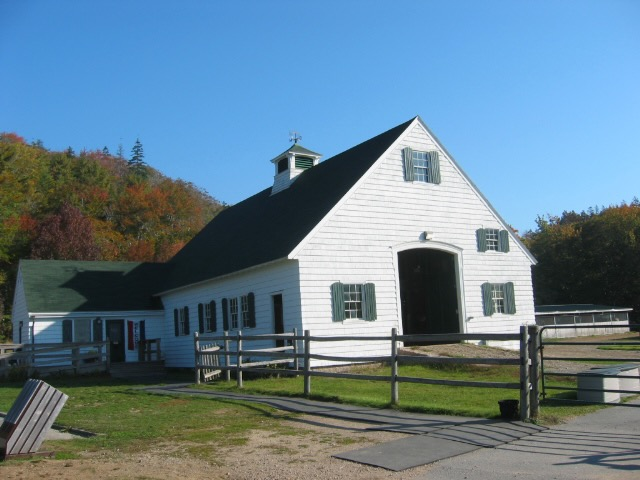
- Wildwood Stables' barn in 2003

- Location within Maine
- Town/City: Seal Harbor
- State: Maine
- Country: United States
- Coordinates: 44.314334°N 68.236629°W
- Owner: National Park Service

Wildwood Stables is a farm near Seal Harbor on Mount Desert Island, Maine, United States. Located in Acadia National Park, on the Park Loop Road, the farm (originally known as Wildwood Farm) was established in 1911. Only the original barn is now standing, after the National Park Service demolished the farm's other structures in 1958. Today, Wildwood Stables is home to several horses which pull carriages around the park's carriage trails in the spring, summer and fall months.

== History ==
Ernest and Helen Dane purchased the property in 1911, having bought land in nearby Seal Harbor two years earlier.

The farm's Wildwood Stables name was in existence at the time of previous owner, William E. Hadlock, a lieutenant colonel in the 28th Maine Infantry during the American Civil War. He had purchased the farm from George and John Jordan, for whom Jordan Pond and Jordan Stream are named.

In 2023, the National Park Service put the stables' operation out to tender for the next decade. They selected Acadia By Carriage LLC, a move which was expected to take effect for the 2024 season. Carriages of Acadia LLC held the contract for thirteen years, due to the COVID-19 pandemic. Around 20,000 people take the carriage rides each year.
