= Park Loop Road =

Scenic road

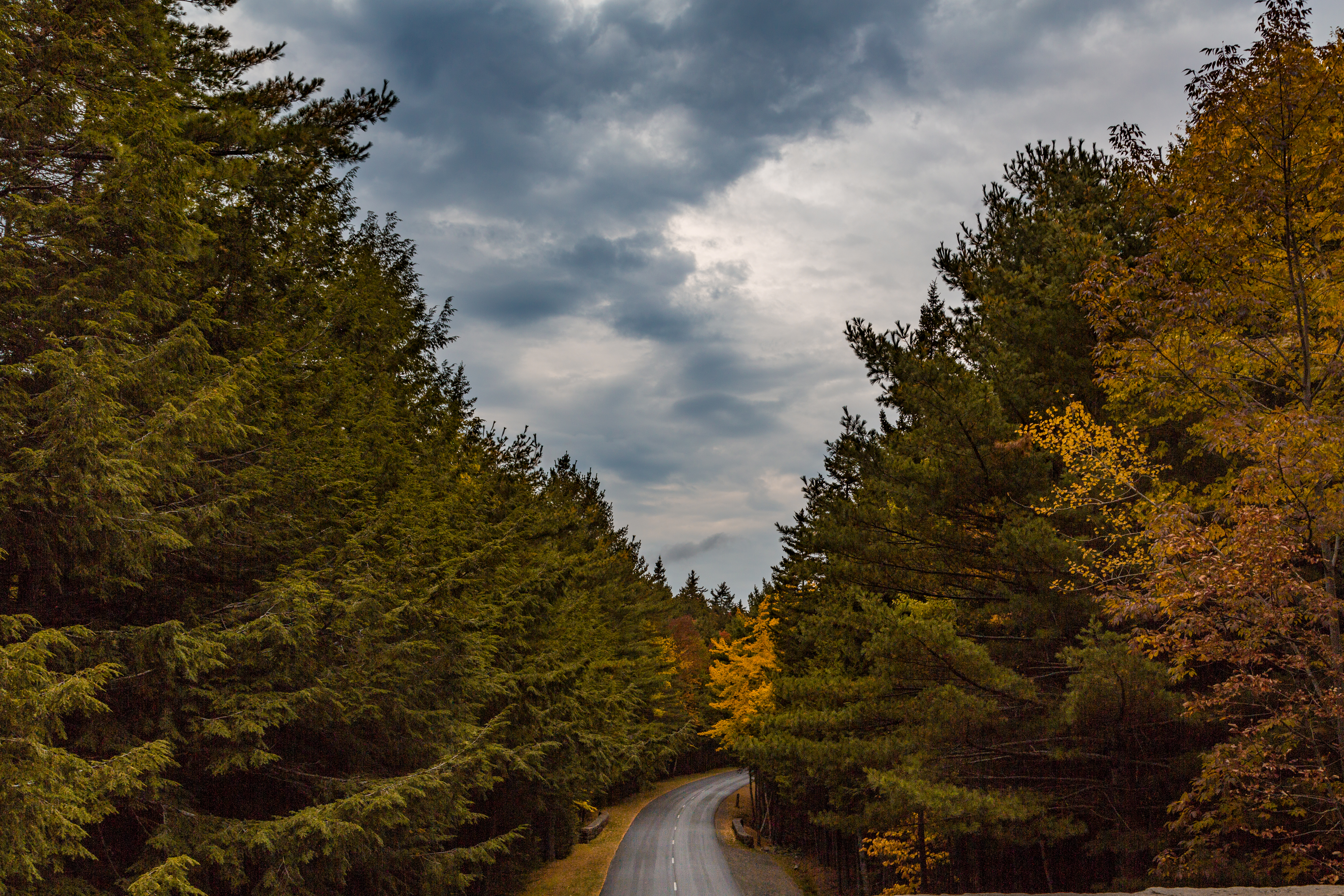
- The Park Loop Road viewed from a bridge on Champlain Drive
- Type: Scenic toll road (partial)
- Length: 27 mi (43 km)

Construction
- Completion: 1958 (68 years ago)

Other
- Website: Park Loop Road

Park Loop Road is a scenic road through part of Acadia National Park in Maine, United States. 27 miles (43 km) long, it traverses the eastern side of Mount Desert Island in a (mostly) one-way, clockwise direction, from Bar Harbor to Seal Harbor. (The road is two-way for a section between Wildwood Stables, toward the middle of Mount Desert Island, and the Hulls Cove entrance near Bar Harbor, to the north.) A toll is required for vehicles continuing on the Loop Road beyond the entrance station immediately inland from Schooner Head overlook; the 5.3-mile (8.5 km) section between Paradise Hill Road, at the foot of Cadillac Mountain, and the entrance station is toll-free.

Completed, under the guidance of John D. Rockefeller Jr., in 1958, after a 37-year process, the road passes geographical features such as Champlain Mountain (location of an exposed cliffside trail named Precipice), the Beehive (another, smaller mountain), Sand Beach (a saltwater swimming area), Gorham Mountain, Thunder Hole (a crevasse into which waves crash loudly), Otter Cliff, Otter Cove, Seal Harbor, Jordan Pond, Pemetic Mountain, the Bubbles, Bubble Rock, Bubble Pond, Eagle Lake, and the side road to the summit of Cadillac Mountain.

The Loop Road opens annually on April 15. In winter (from December 1), only one 1.8-mile (2.9 km) section of the road remains open to vehicles: Ocean Drive, between the Sand Beach entrance station and Otter Cliff Road. This section of the road is one of the most heavily visited areas of the park.

Two of Acadia's 32 historic bridges span the Park Loop Road: the Sieur de Monts Spring Bridge and the Blackwoods Bridge, both of which carry State Route 3 (Champlain Drive) and were built in 1939.

== Points of interest ==
Beginning at the junction of Paradise Hill Road and traveling in a clockwise direction, the following points of interest are passed:

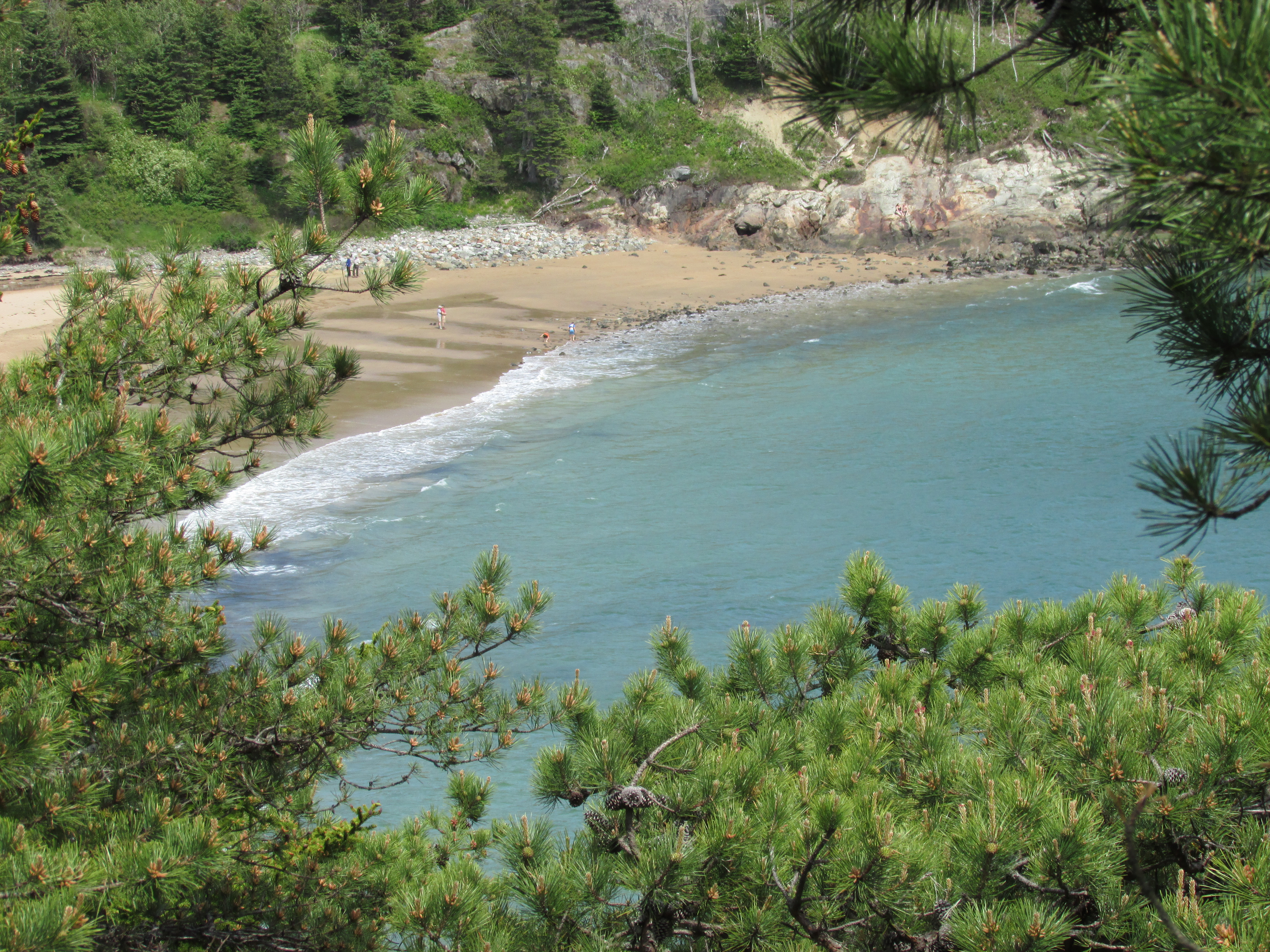
Sand Beach, viewed from the Park Loop Road

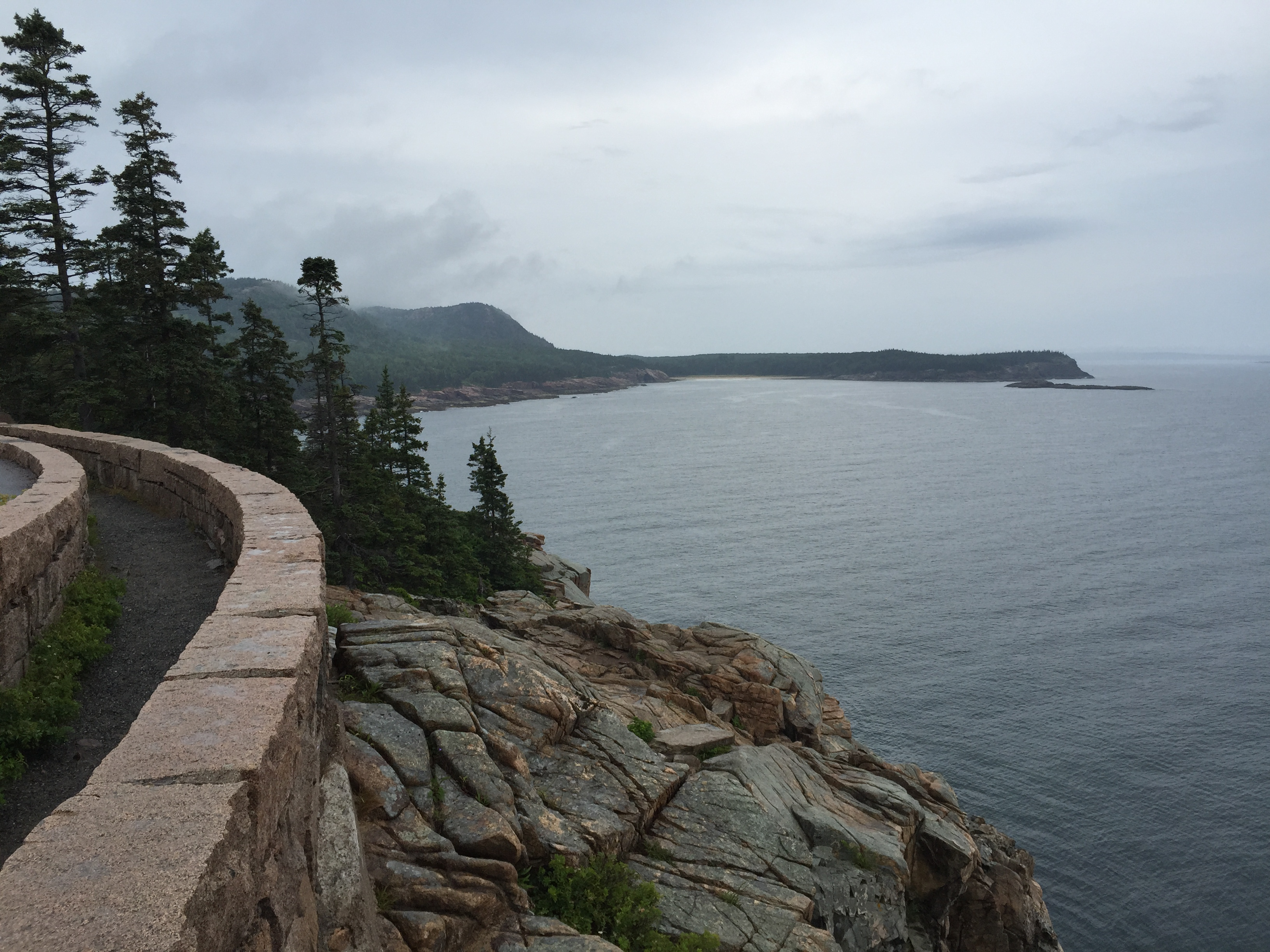
Otter Cliff overlook

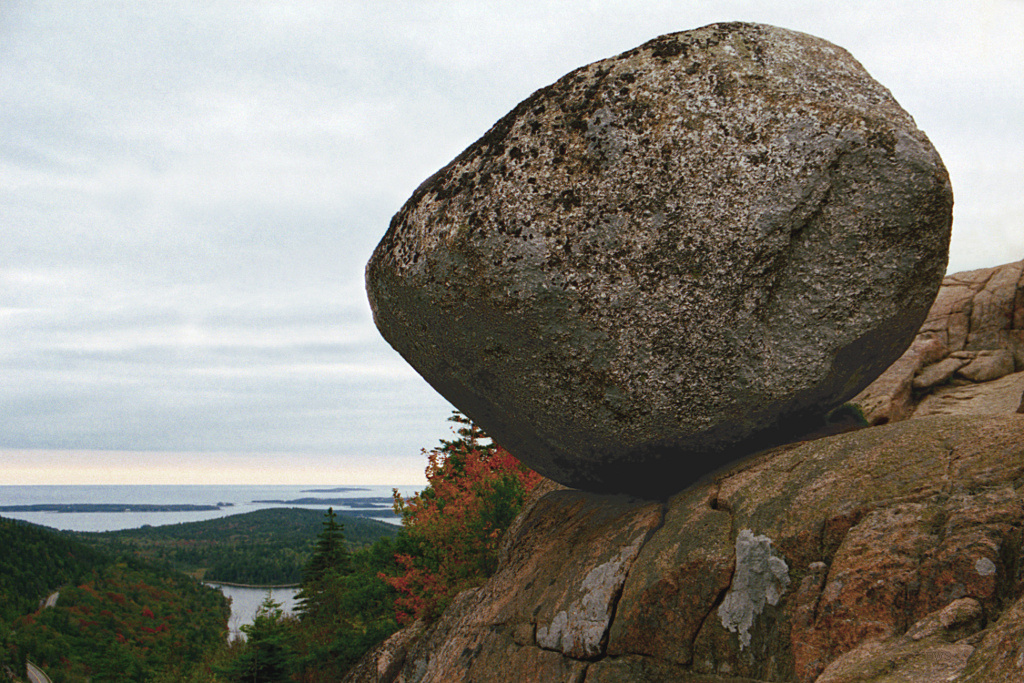
Bubble Rock

- Jessup Path and Hemlock Loop trailhead
- Sieur de Monts and the Wild Gardens of Acadia
- Beaver Dam Pond
- Champlain North Ridge trailhead
- Sols Cliff overlook
- Egg Rock overlook
- Precipice trailhead
- Champlain Mountain (end of toll-free section)
- Beehive Trail
- Sand Beach
- Newport Cove
- Thunder Hole
- Gorham Mountain trailhead
- Boulder Beach
- Otter Cliff overlook (where the Loop Road splits briefly between an upper and lower level)
- Otter Point overlook
- Fabbri picnic area (named for Alessandro Fabbri)
- Otter Cove
- Otter Cove Bridge and causeway
- Western Point overlook
- Hunters Beach overlook (southern tip of the Loop Road)
- Wildwood Stables
- Jordan Pond Gatehouse
- Jordan Pond House
- Bubble Rock
- Bubbles Divide trail
- Bubble Pond
- Eagle Lake overlook

== See also ==
- Acadia National Park carriage paths, bridges and gatehouses
