= Acadia National Park carriage paths, bridges and gatehouses =

Features of park in Maine, US

- Carriage Paths, Bridges and Gatehouses
- U.S. National Register of Historic Places
- U.S. Historic district
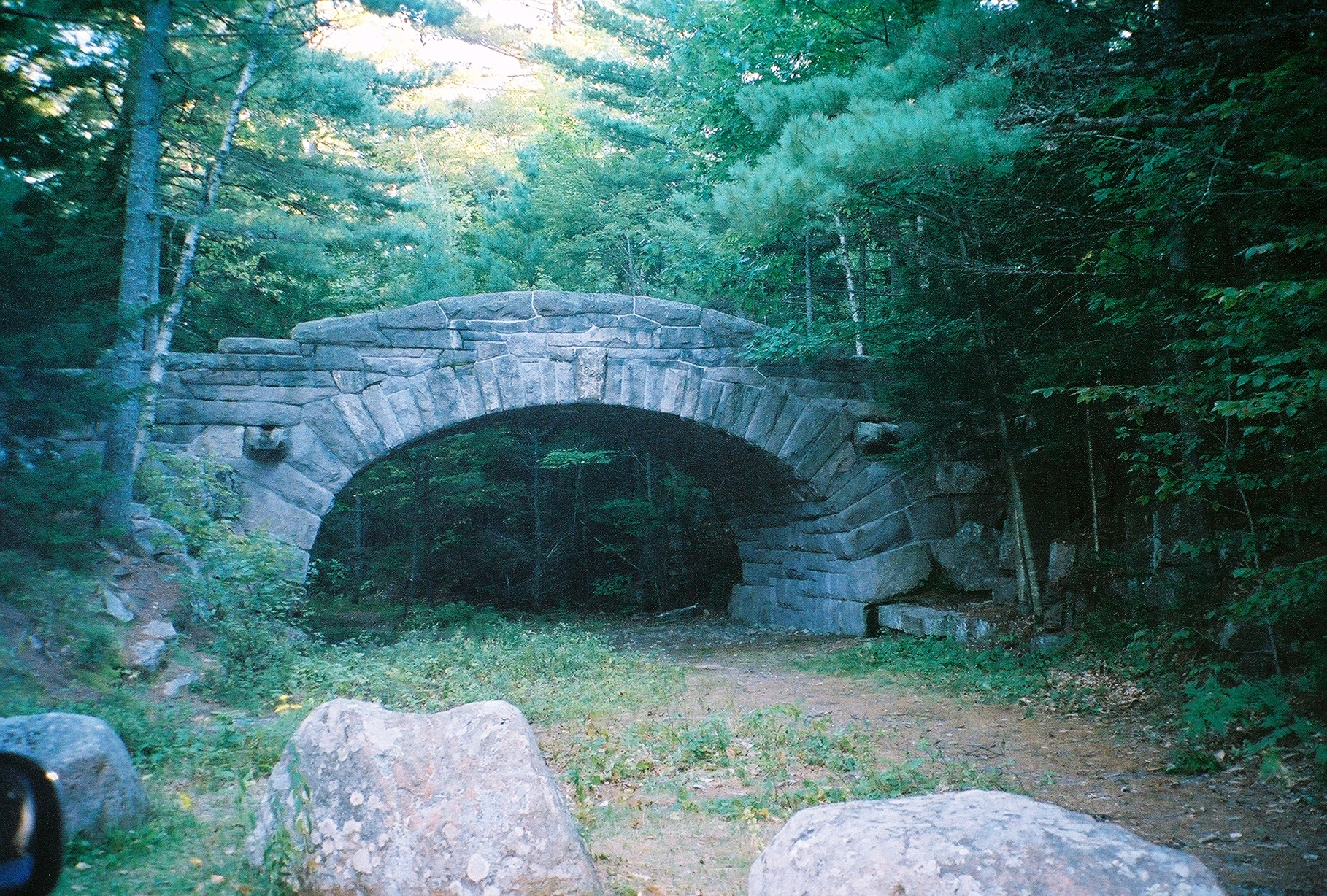
- Stone bridge at Bubble Pond, September 2005

- Location within Maine
- Nearest city: Bar Harbor, Maine
- Coordinates: 44°21′N 68°13′W
- Built: 1919
- Architect: Grosvenor Atterbury
- Architectural style: Tudor Revival
- NRHP reference No.: 79000131
- Added to NRHP: November 14, 1979

Acadia National Park, largely on Mount Desert Island, off the coast of the U.S. state of Maine, was created in part by land and other donations by John D. Rockefeller Jr. Between 1919 and 1931, Rockefeller, who was opposed to the introduction of automobiles on the island, personally oversaw the construction of a network of carriage roads, closed to motorized vehicles, on the eastern half of the island, including sixteen granite bridges and two gatehouses. The major portion of this network now falls within the bounds of the national park, and was listed on the National Register of Historic Places in 1979.

The network of carriage roads is open to the public for non-motorized uses in the summer, including walking and bicycling. In the winter, most of the network is open to cross-country skiing, and a portion of it is open to snowmobiling.

== History ==
Beginning in about 1890, Mount Desert Island became a summer resort haven for a number of wealthy families, including the Rockefellers, Carnegies, and Vanderbilts. Despite their efforts to keep the island free of motor vehicles, their presence was authorized across the whole island by 1915. John D. Rockefeller Jr., who had a large summer house on the southeastern part of the island, in response embarked on a major effort to build a network of carriage roads on its eastern half, which would be isolated from the roads open to motor vehicles, and which would provide access to the scenic views of the area. He personally selected the skilled craftsmen who built the roads, bridges, and gatehouses, and directly supervised a significant portion of the work, which took place between 1919 and 1931. The overall design was approved by Frederick Law Olmsted Jr. The entire project resulted in the construction of more than 50 miles (80 km) of roads, sixteen bridges, and two Tudor Revival gatehouses at the points where the system intersected the public roads. The present bounds of Acadia National Park include 47 miles (76 km) of these roads, thirteen of its bridges, and both gatehouses.

== Description ==
=== Carriage paths and bridges ===
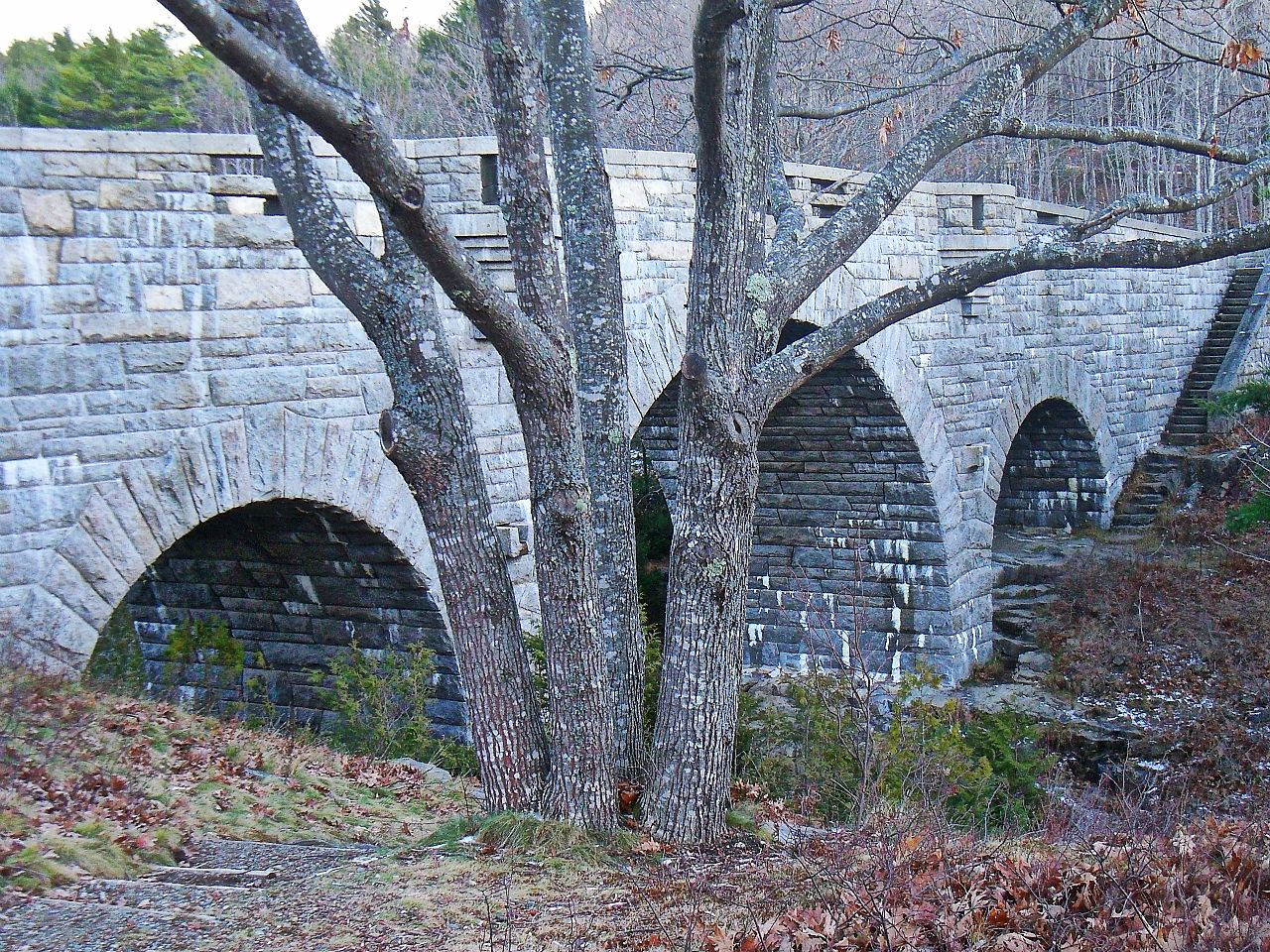
Duck Brook Bridge

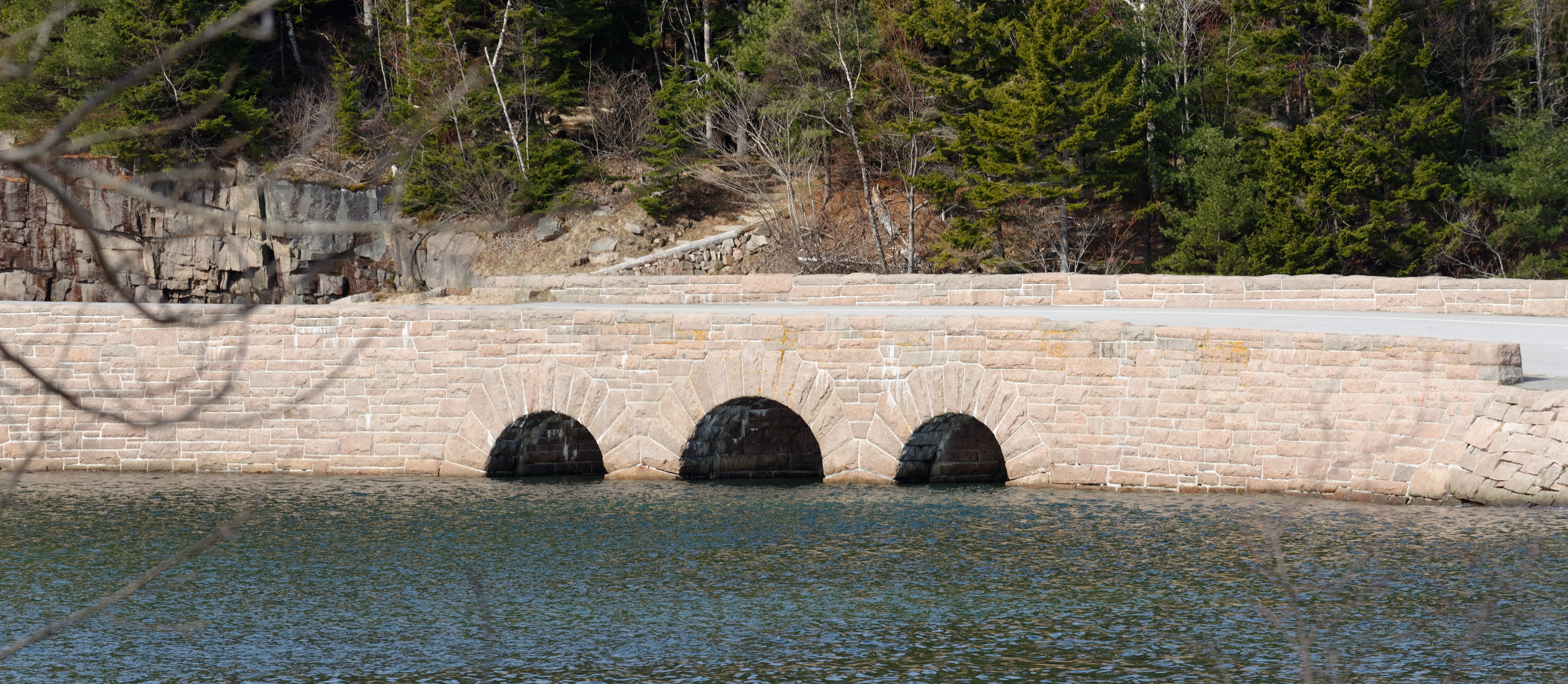

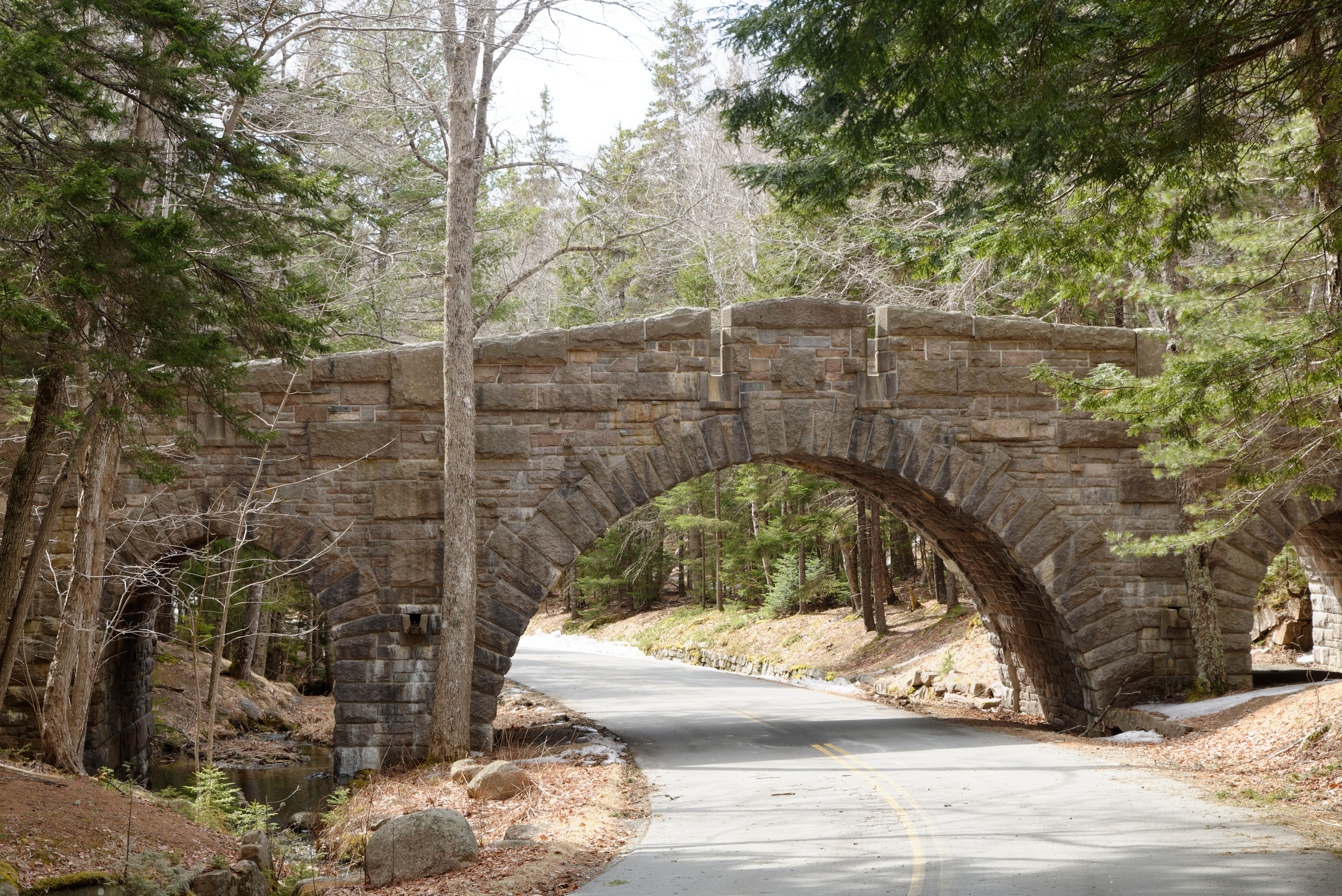
Stanley Brook Bridge

The carriage paths consist of a network of wide paths, laid out to take advantage of the area's natural terrain, and to provide access to fine views of the area's lakes, mountains, and bays. Foot paths extend from the carriage paths into the woods. The carriage paths are about 16 feet (4.9 m) wide, and are generally surfaced by the National Park Service with fine gravel, with a slight rise at the center to allow for proper drainage. The trails are resurfaced every ten to fifteen years due to Maine's heavy winters.

The bridges in the network are all built out of hand-hewn locally quarried granite. They were specifically designed to blend into the landscape in an organic manner, and are sited so that they may be used as viewing platforms for the scenery, and so that they may themselves be viewed. They often include viewing platforms for one or both purposes. The only bridge that has been altered in any significant way is the Eagle Lake Bridge, which carries Maine State Route 233 over a carriage path, and was the subject of an award-winning widening project in 1974.

=== Gatehouses ===
The Brown Mountain Gatehouse, also known locally as "The Lodge", is near the southwestern corner of the park on Maine State Routes 3 and 198. It is a small complex consisting of the gatehouse, a caretaker's house, and carriage house, and was designed in the Tudor Revival style by Grosvenor Atterbury. It is built of rubble-stone masonry, with occasional bands of precisely-laid dressed stone and brick. The buildings are roofed in polychrome terra cotta tile. The gates are made of cypress wood, and are set in a segmented-arch opening. This lodge, like the one at Jordan Pond, is now used for park service staff housing. On the inside of the gate, away from the main road, there is an expansive area of landscaped lawn.

The Jordan Pond Gatehouse is at the southern end of Jordan Pond, where the carriage path network intersects the Park Loop Road. Like the Brown Mountain Gatehouse, it was also designed by Atterbury and contains similar elements and styling. It is laid out in a more linear fashion, with its elements joined by a masonry fence. The towers that flank the gates are topped by bellcast roofs with terra cotta tile.

== See also ==
- National Register of Historic Places listings in Hancock County, Maine
- National Register of Historic Places listings in Acadia National Park
- Wildwood Stables
