= The Bubbles (Mount Desert Island) =

Pair of mountains in Hancock County, Maine, United States

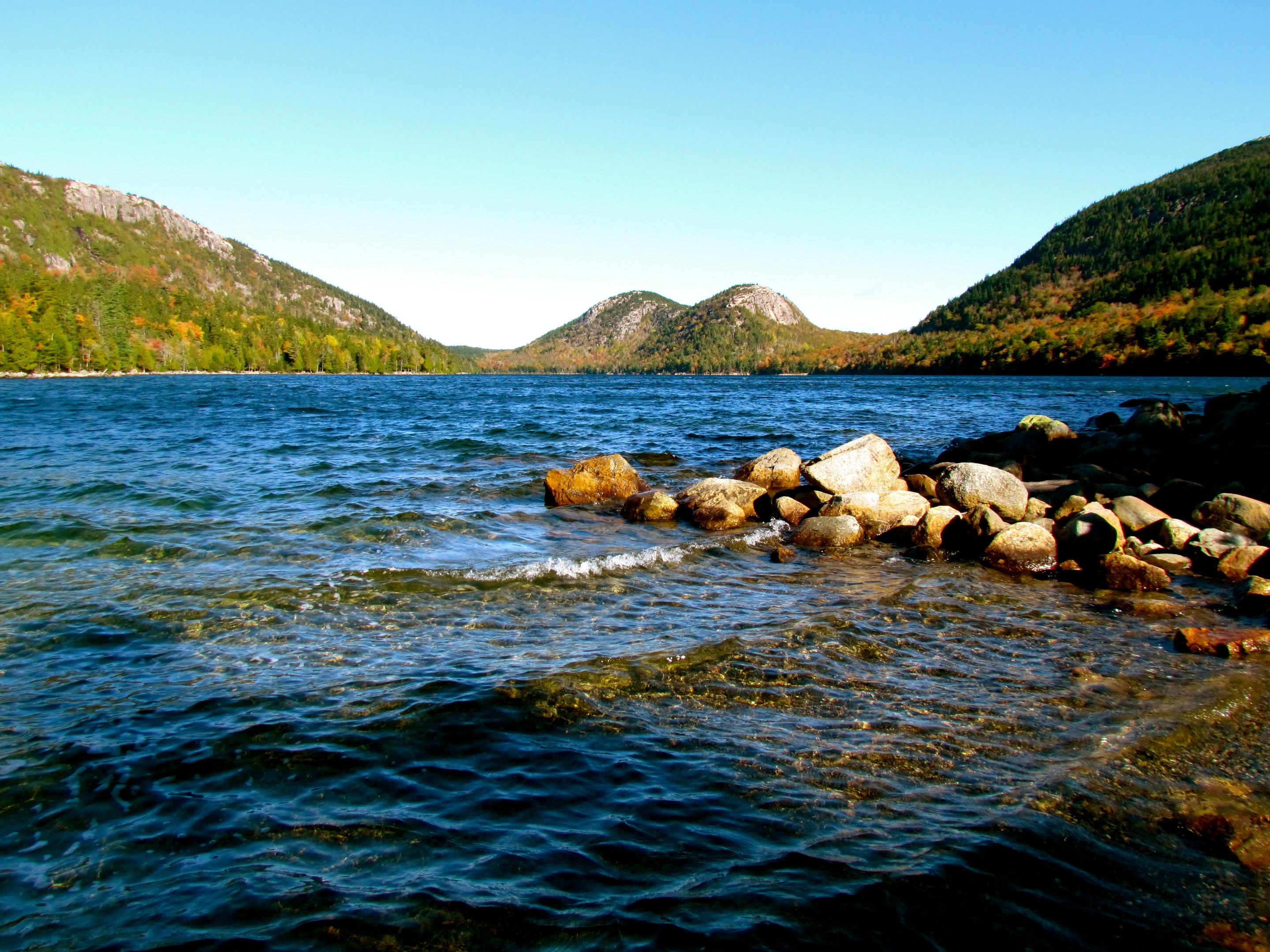
- The Bubbles, looking north from Jordan Pond

Highest point
- Elevation: 830 ft (250 m)
- Coordinates: 44°20′27″N 68°15′16″W

Geography
- Location: Hancock County, Maine, U.S.
- Topo map: USGS Seal Harbor

Climbing
- Easiest route: Marked hiking trails

The Bubbles are pair of rounded roche moutonnées on Mount Desert Island, within Acadia National Park, in Maine, United States. Consisting of the North Bubble and South Bubble, they are one of the most popular photographic subjects in the park, with common viewpoints behind the lawn at Jordan Pond House or the adjacent Jordan Pond. The two mountains are separated by a narrow saddle valley. Bubble Rock, a massive glacial erratic carried 19 miles (31 km) by the ice sheet from a Lucerne granite outcrop, perches precariously on the edge of the South Bubble. The mountains are 830 feet (250 m) in height.

== Bubble Rock ==
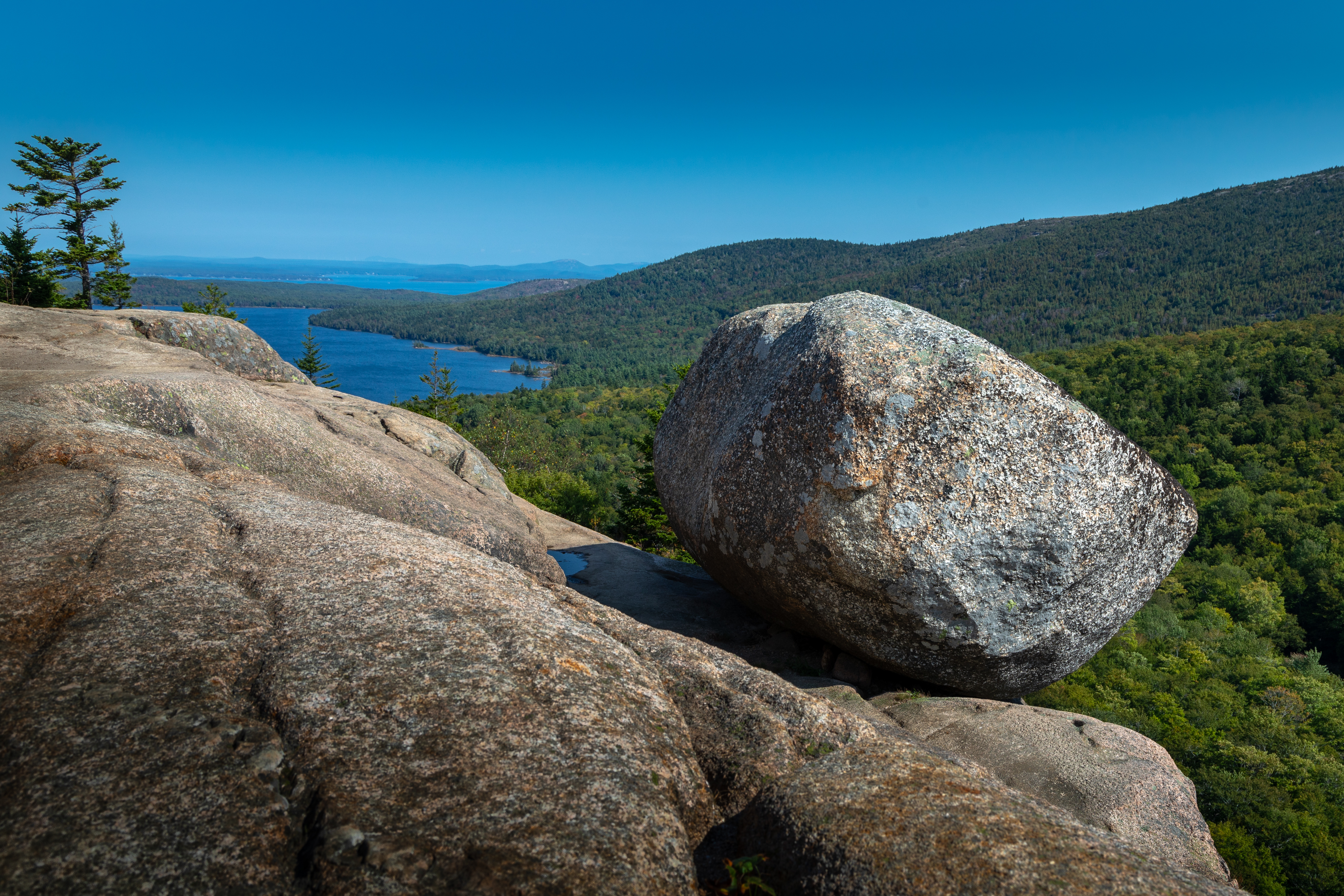
Bubble Rock
