= Jordan Stream =

Location
- Country: United States

Physical characteristics
- Source: Jordan Pond
  - location: Mount Desert, Maine
  - coordinates: 44.3220519°N 68.2548070°W
  - elevation: 271 ft (83 m)
- Mouth: Little Long Pond
  - location: Seal Harbor, Maine
  - coordinates: 44.30293586°N 68.25597529°W
- Length: 1.4 mi (2.3 km)

Jordan Stream is a watercourse, about 1.4 miles (2.3 km) long, in the American village of Seal Harbor, Maine. It originates at the southern end of Jordan Pond, in the nearby town of Mount Desert, and flows directly south to its mouth at the northern end of Little Long Pond.

The Jordan Stream valley is pre-glacial. It originally drained southeasterly to Seal Harbor but now drains, initially through a bedrock gorge, southwesterly.
