= Jordan Pond House =

Restaurant

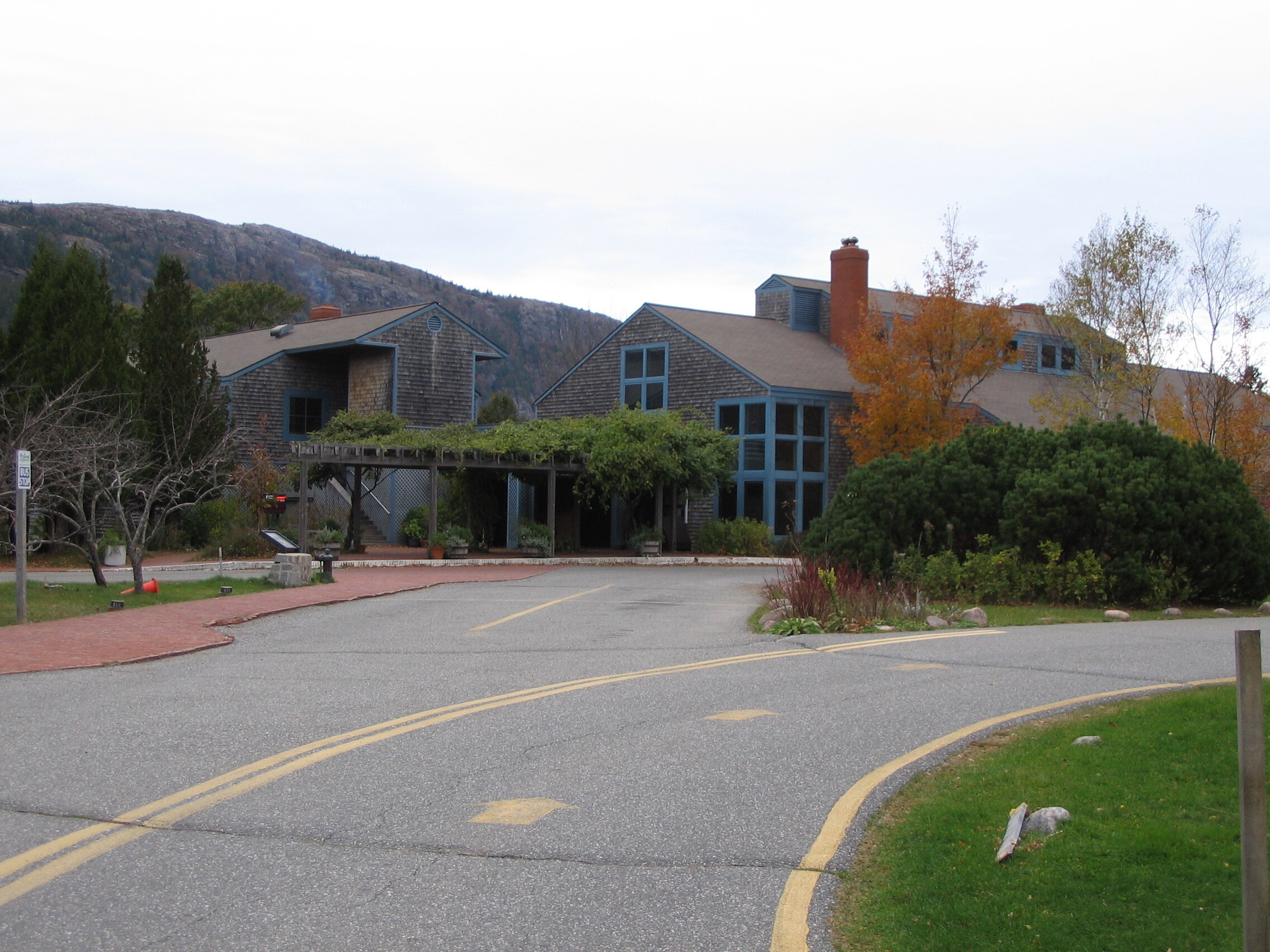
- A 2005 view of the main entrance
- Interactive map of Jordan Pond House

Restaurant information
- Established: c. 1872 (154 years ago)
- Owner: National Park Service
- Location: 2928 Park Loop Road, Seal Harbor, Maine, 04675, United States
- Coordinates: 44.3204°N 68.2536°W
- Website: jordanpondhouse.com

Jordan Pond House is a restaurant in Seal Harbor, Maine. It is situated at the southwestern corner of the Park Loop Road, overlooking Jordan Pond from its southern shore. Two roche moutonnées, known as "The Bubbles", provide the backdrop to the view from the house's lawn at the rear of the 60 acres (24 ha) property.

The property's history can be traced to 1847, when the first settlers set up a logging operation.

The original farm house was constructed by the Jordan family, locals for whom the pond and house were named.

Jordan Pond House was established as a restaurant by Melvan Tibbetts in the early 1870s. In 1883, Bostonian Charles T. How, one of the first to develop real estate in Bar Harbor, bought the property. In 1895, Mr and Mrs Thomas McIntyre took over the business, which would remain in their hands for the next half-century. Near the end of this reign, John D. Rockefeller Jr. purchased the property and donated it to the National Park Service to ensure its continued existence.

The Acadia Corporation, a small group of local preservationists, operated the business between 1946 and 2013, at which point they lost their bid to renew its contract. The popover recipe they used at Jordan Pond House is now used at the Asticou Hotel, in nearby Northeast Harbor, which they have managed since 2015. Jordan Pond House is now managed by Dawnland LLC, a subsidiary of Ortega National Parks LLC, based in New Mexico. The National Park Service's decision to award the contract to an out-of-state vendor prompted an online petition against the move. Dawnland's contract runs until 2025.

On June 21, 1979, the original Jordan Pond House building was destroyed by fire. Through the work of the Island Foundation, private funds were contributed to build a replacement, which was completed in 1982.

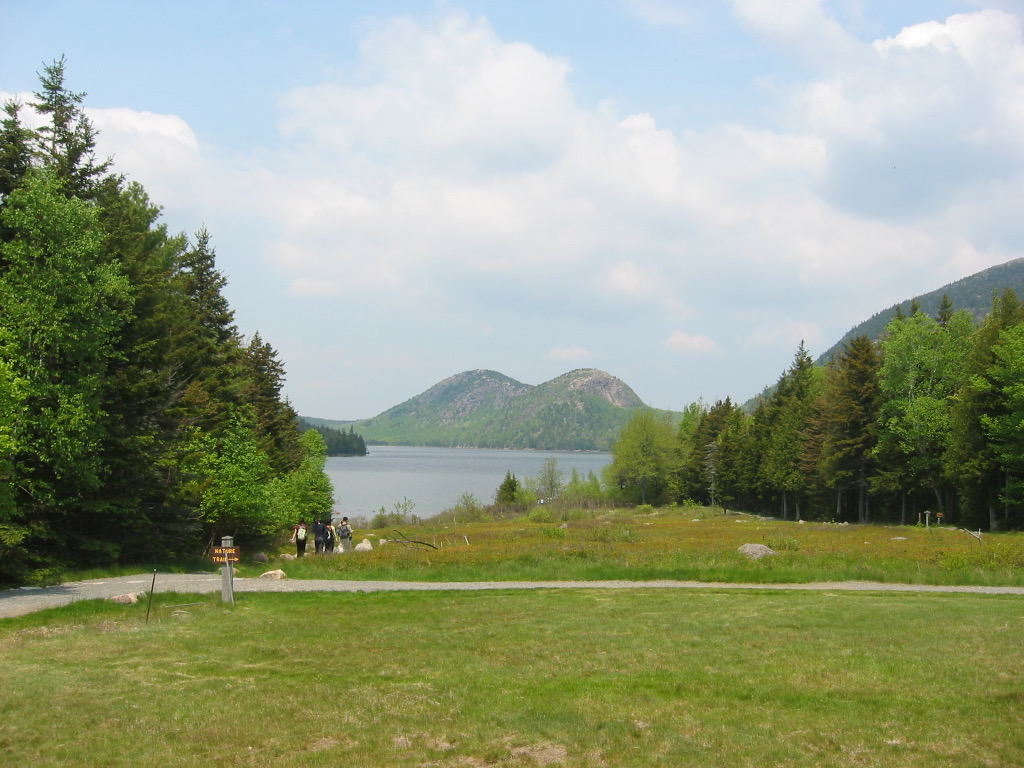
Looking north to Jordan Pond and "The Bubbles" from the Jordan Pond House lawn
