= Jordan Pond =

Lake in Maine, United States

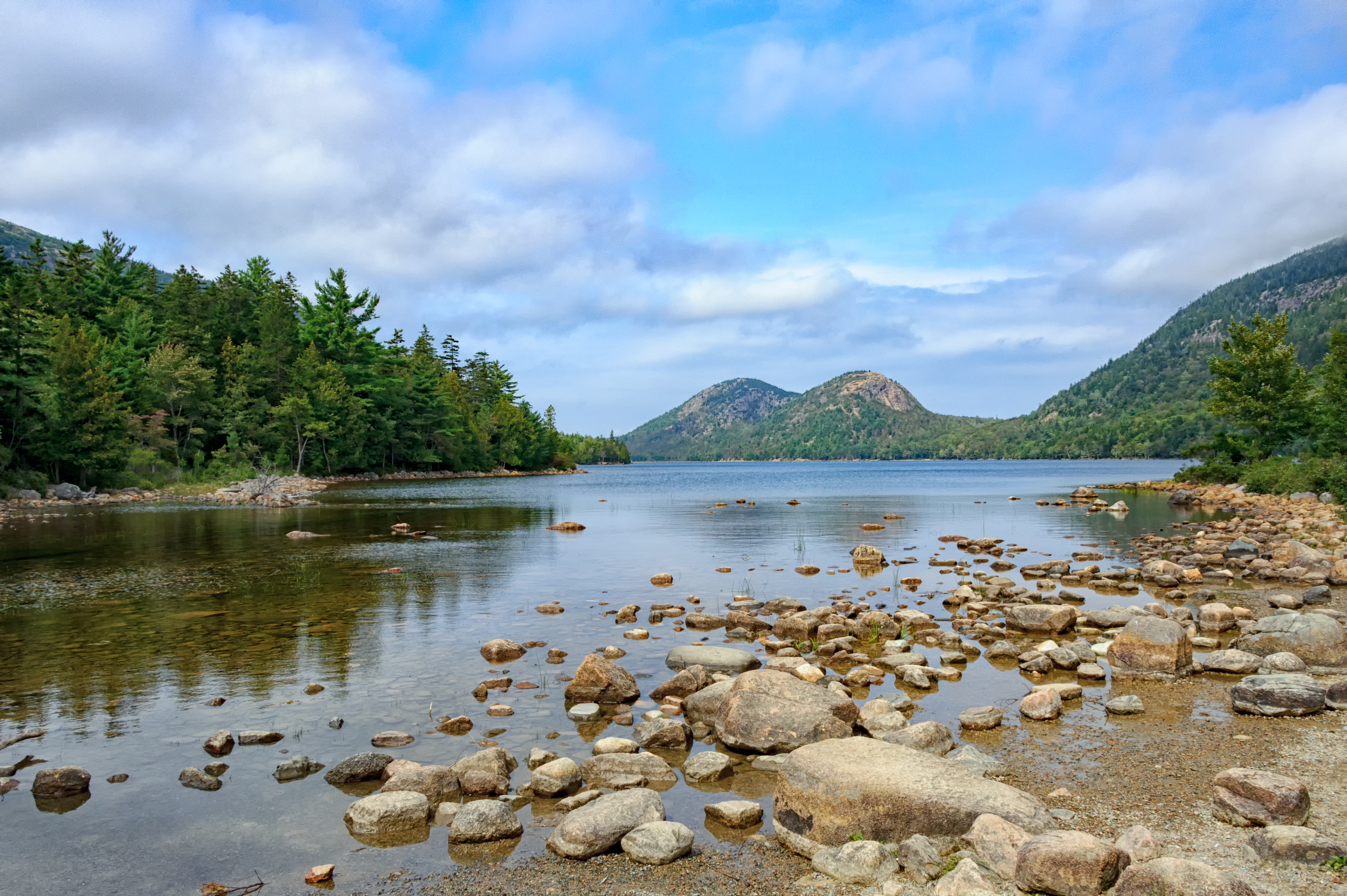
- Jordan Pond and The Bubbles

- Location within Maine Location within the United States
- Location: Hancock County, Maine
- Coordinates: 44°19′54.6″N 68°15′18.4″W
- Type: oligotrophic tarn
- Primary inflows: Deer Brook
- Primary outflows: Jordan Stream
- Catchment area: 1.92 sq mi (5.0 km^{2})
- Basin countries: United States
- Surface area: 187 acres (76 ha)
- Average depth: 84 ft (25.6 m)
- Max. depth: 150 ft (45.7 m)
- Water volume: 14,097 acre⋅ft (17,388,000 m^{3})
- Residence time: 6 years
- Surface elevation: 274 ft (84 m)
- Settlements: Mount Desert

Jordan Pond is an oligotrophic tarn in Acadia National Park near the town of Bar Harbor, Maine. The pond covers 187 acres (76 ha) to a maximum depth of 150 feet (46 m) with a shoreline of 3.6 miles (5.8 km).

The pond was formed by the Wisconsin Ice Sheet during the last glacial period. Penobscot Mountain (1194 ft) rises to the west, while Pemetic Mountain (1247 ft) rises to the east. Two roche moutonnées known as The Bubbles (North and South) rise above the northeastern shoreline. The southern end is constrained by glacial debris and an artificial dam.

The pond has clear water, with visibility normally 44 feet (13.4 m) and occasionally recorded up to 61 feet (18.6 m), the deepest recordings in Maine. The pond exhibits high levels of dissolved oxygen, and low levels of plant nutrients and plant life.

Some types of boating are permitted, but people and pets are prohibited from entering the water as it is the water supply for the village of Seal Harbor.

== Park usage ==
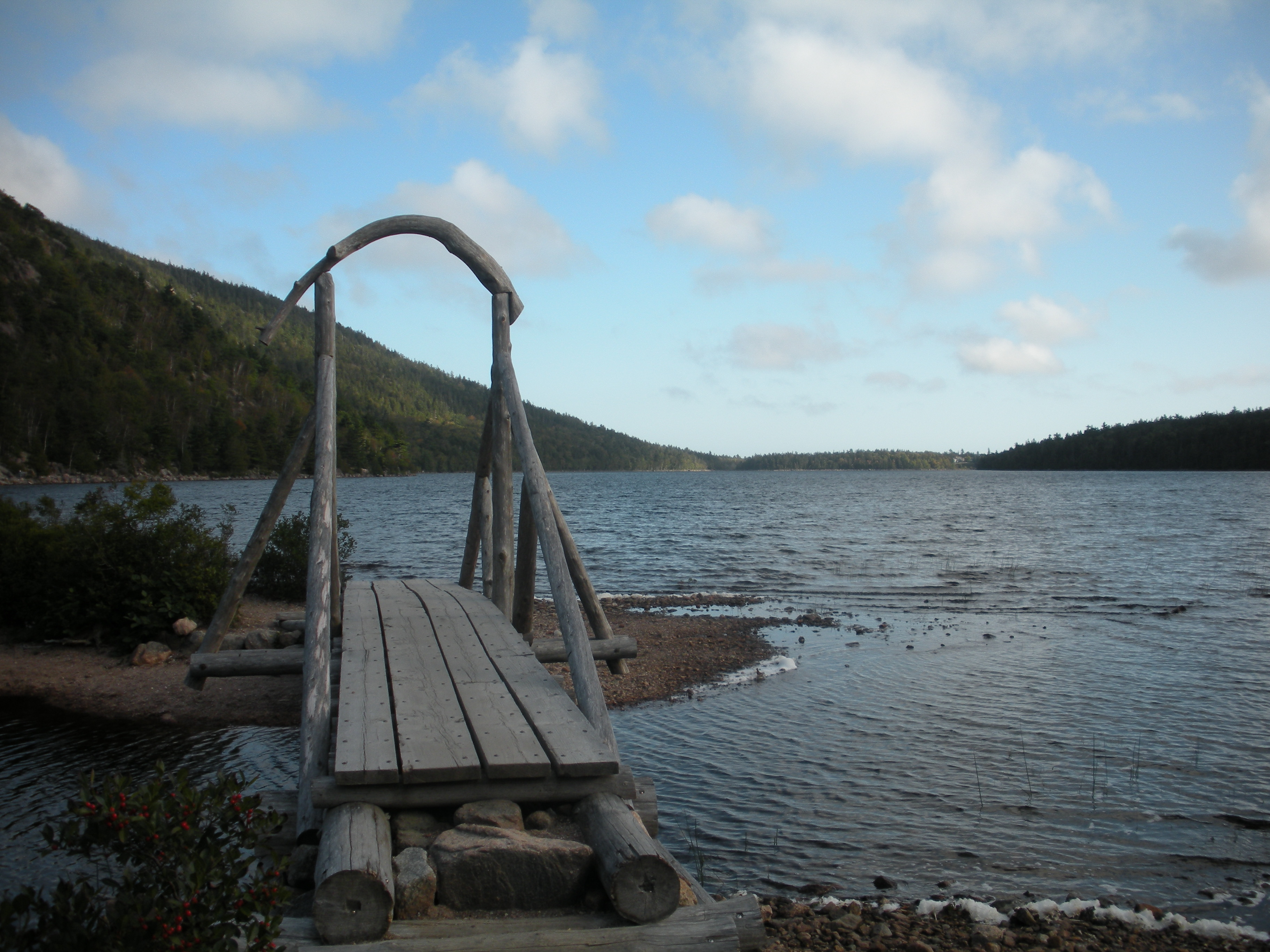
A bridge along the northern end of the pond trail

Park officials estimate that roughly 60 percent of park visitors will visit the pond, primarily the tea-house at the southern end, at some point in their stay. The pond is ringed by a walking trail, from which trails branch off to other park features. One of the park's original carriage trails runs along an adjacent ridge.

The Jordan family of Seal Harbor, for whom the pond is named, built a farmhouse near the pond. In the 1870s a restaurant known as the Jordan Pond House was built. Under the management of the McIntires, who operated the establishment from 1895 to 1946, the restaurant became a regular location for high society events. John D. Rockefeller Jr. purchased the restaurant and gave it to the National Park Service. The original building was destroyed by fire in June 1979, and a new building was financed through private fund raising. The Jordan Pond House has a gift shop and a restaurant serving lunch and dinner. The restaurant is known for its service of tea and popovers both on the enclosed veranda and outdoors on the lawn overlooking the pond.

== Flora and fauna ==
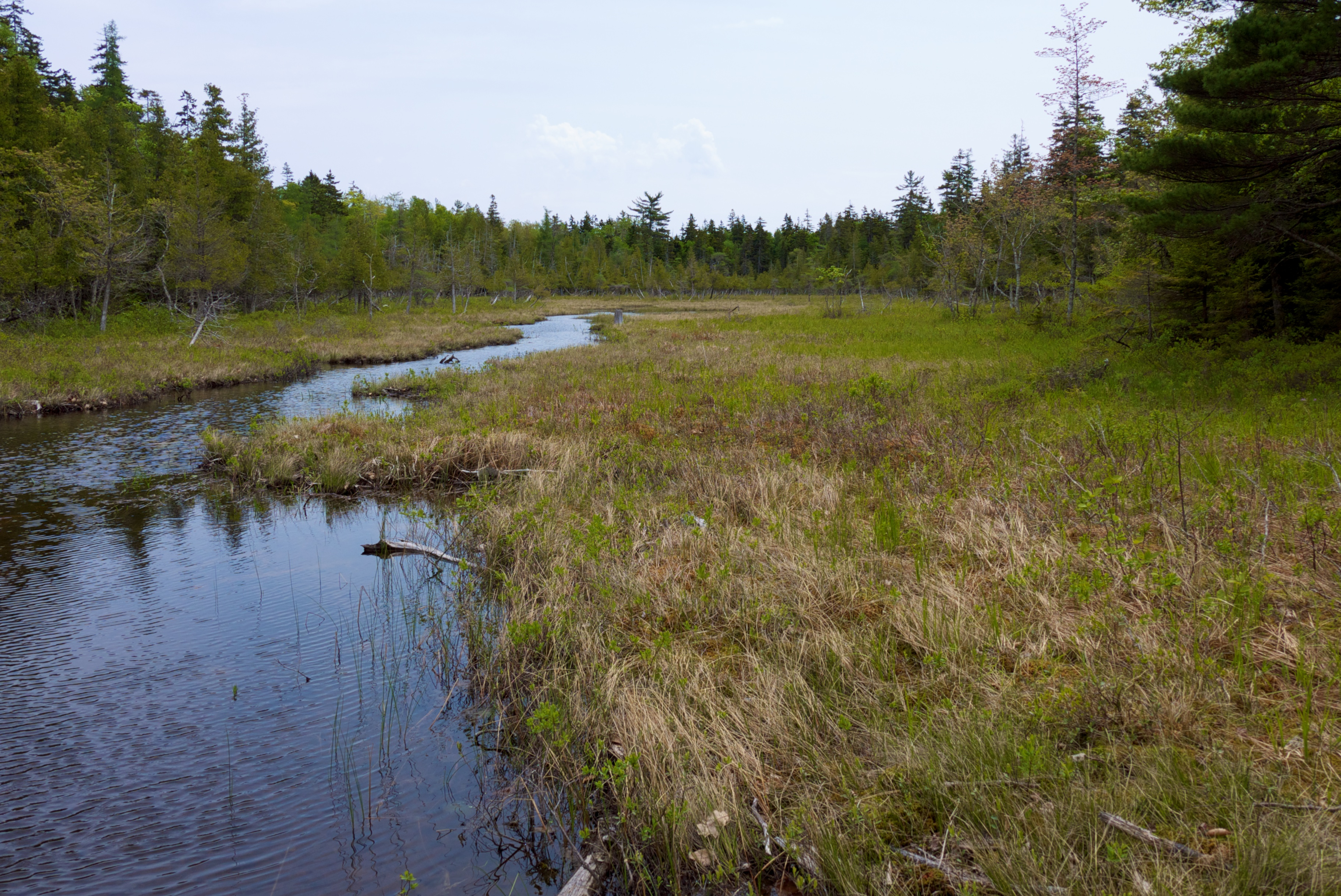
Marshy area by the pond

Jordan Pond was previously thought to be the only pond containing the type specimen of a quillwort species described by Alvah Augustus Eaton. The species was formerly known as Isoetes macróspora var. heteróspora (or Isoetes heterospora) but is now considered to be a synonym for Isoetes lacustris, which is found in both North America and Europe. Four other quillwort species are also found in the lake, along with three species of pondweed, two species each of rushes, bur-reeds, and carnivorous bladderworts, and at least six other species of plants.

Fish species in the lake include landlocked Atlantic salmon, lake trout, brook trout, rainbow smelt, four species of minnow, banded killifish, three-spined stickleback, pumpkinseed sunfish, and the American eel. The landlocked salmon, lake trout, smelt, sticklebacks, and at least one species of minnow are known to have been introduced or stocked by humans.
