= Project Boresight =

Project Boresight was a United States program that built radio-location systems to find the position of Russian submarines that were using burst communications. It was created as a top-secret program.

== Background ==
In November, 1960 Soviet Union submarines started using a new communications mode using burst communications, where radio teletype messages were sent in bursts under one second long. Monitoring stations could no longer intercept USSR submarine communications. By the end of 1960 however noises that sounded like bursts of static were determined to be USSR radio transmissions. Although a signal could be detected, the transmission time was too short for current radio location systems to work. These required an operator to steer an antenna to find the direction to the transmission.

=== Soviet system ===
A new radio communications system had been developed by the Soviet Naval Research Institute of Communication (Научно-исследовательский институт ВМФ ? or Научно-исследовательского центра телекоммуникационных технологий и разведки Военно-морского флота ?) and came into use around 1956. The waveform was termed CIS Akula (СБД "Акула") (the Russian word for "shark"). It was a frequency shift keying with shift of 1000 Hz and a very high baud rate of 500 bits per second. Other terms for this were Shark and 49th channel. It can be unscrambled by the polynomial X^{5}+X^{3}+1. The unscrambled signal contains six bit chunks, of which one is framing. The whole transmission had ten groups of five digits, ending in 1771, and lasted for 0.72 seconds. Transmitting equipment was the coded text puncher P-758 (датчики Р-758), and receiver was the P-759 (приемники Р-759). The transmitter used a keyboard with 15 buttons, and paper tape.

A slightly updated version is called "Dolphin" (Дельфин) and uses P-758IS equipment. Akula II uses PSK.

== Response ==
The United States setup up a program to do direction finding on very short bursts of radio signal, using retrospective direction finding. The idea was to record the transmissions from multiple antennas, at multiple sites, and then triangulate by comparing the recordings. Circular antenna arrays were built with radio receivers for each. These were called "circularly disposed wide-aperture direction finding arrays". The designation was AN/FRD-10. A magnetic tape recorder (AN/FSH-6) was triggered by the message leader and timestamped the message to within a millisecond. This equipment was called AN/FRA-44 recorder/analyses system. The circular array permitted a direction of arrival to be measured. Signal timing from multiple receiver sites allowed the range and an approximation of the transmitter position to be determined. Computers used were designated "AN/GYK-3".

BORESIGHT receiving stations were used to locate Soviet submarines during the Cuban Missile Crisis.

Following its success, many more stations were built in 1962 and 1963 in Adak, Alaska; Kamiseya, Japan; Guam; Pearl Harbor; Port Lyautey, North Africa; Edzell, Scotland; Cheltenham, England; Recife, Brazil; Winter Harbor, Maine. Canadian direction finding stations in the Supplementary Radio System were at Gloucester, Ontario, Frobisher Bay, North West Territories, Coverdale, New Brunswick and Gander, Newfoundland.

Others were built at Skaggs Island and Imperial Beach California, Nea Makri. At Sugar Grove, WV two antennas like this were built for communications rather than direction finding.

Project Bulls Eye extended the direction finding system worldwide, and used computers to quickly triangulate positions.

== Antenna ==
The project Boresight was developed by Naval Research Lab in Washington DC. An initial prototype antenna array used 40 vertically aligned half rhombic antennas in a 400 foot diameter circle. A second prototype used 40 sleeve monopoles in a 434-foot circle. It was completed in October 1957, and was used to direction find Sputnik 1. These were augmented by a reflecting screen in June 1958. Signals from eight adjacent antennas were combined in phase using delay lines and a capacitively coupled goniometer. To get multiple beams, each antennas signal was split eight ways by way of autotransformers. These prototypes were built at Hybla Valley, Virginia

Later versions had a diameter of 800 feet, and three dipole antennas at each position to cover a wider frequency range.

== Receiver ==
AN/FLR-7 and AN/FRA-44 system was later replaced with AN/FLR-11 and AN/FRA-54.

The system the R-1125/FLR was a wideband triple conversion superheterodyne receiver. The output was 60 kHz bandwidth centred on 65 kHz, 35.0 to 95.0 kc.

The R-1125/FLR was later upgraded to R-1230/FLR by adding a cooling fan. This was a broadband high-frequency receiver with input from 2 to 32 MHz and 60 kHz bandwidth output. It was a triple conversion superheterodyne.

== Recorder ==
The magnetic tape recorder, AN/FSH-6 used half inch magnetic tape. The recorder was manufactured by S Himmelstein and Company of Illinois. It recorded up to 7 channels. The tape was wrapped around a spinning headwheel, with recorded diagonal stripes 4 or 8 inches long. The headwheel could have its speed adjusted at 15 or 30 scans per second. The recorder could record signals of frequency up to 480 kHz in direct mode. An FM mode was also available with much more limited bandwidth, but better signal to noise ratio, and ability to record down to DC (0 Hz).

== Computer ==
The AN/GYK-3 computer was a polymorphic multiprocessor system. It was the first multiprocessor, and was designed to operate even if some modules had failed. It had multiple processor (1-4), memory (1-16) and input modules. The computer was supplied by Burroughs Corporation in 1962. It connected 64 teletype circuits and some local operating terminals. Output included a high speed printer and cathode ray tubes. Up to 10 tasks were added each minute. Each task required several data reports from the outlying stations. The computer received about 100 data reports every minute. So about 20 tasks were operating concurrently.

There were two input-output buses. These could attach up to 10 input-output modules. Each module could support 64 attachments. Although there were multiple processor modules, there was inadequate memory protection, and memory interlock protection had to be ensured in software. Memory access was enable with base registers and offsets, and with a mode that allowed variable levels of indirection by way of an indirect bit on a memory stored address. The word size was 48 bits.

This computer system model became known as the D825.
