= Winter Harbor Light =

Lighthouse in Maine, US

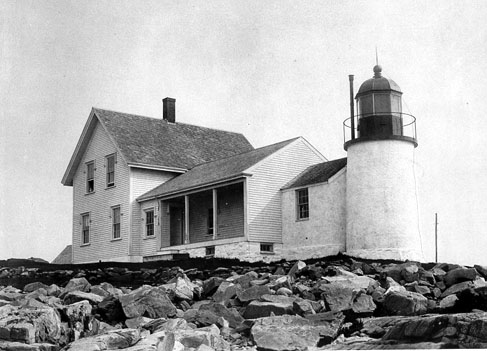
- Location: Winter Harbor, Maine
- Coordinates: 44°18′33″N 68°44′34.4″W

Tower
- Constructed: 1856
- Foundation: Brick
- Construction: Brick
- Height: 19 feet (5.8 m)
- Shape: Cylindrical Tower, attached Dwelling
- Markings: White
- Heritage: National Register of Historic Places listed place

Light
- Deactivated: 1933
- Lens: 5th order Fresnel lens
- Winter Harbor Light Station
- U.S. National Register of Historic Places
- U.S. Historic district
- Area: 2.8 acres (1.1 ha)
- MPS: Light Stations of Maine MPS
- NRHP reference No.: 87002538
- Added to NRHP: February 1, 1988

Winter Harbor Light is a lighthouse in Winter Harbor, Maine. It is located on Mark Island, a small island between the Schoodic Peninsula and Turtle Island, near the entry to the town's main harbor. The light was built in 1856 and was deactivated in 1933; it is no longer an aid to navigation, and is privately owned. The light was listed on the National Register of Historic Places as Winter Harbor Light Station on February 1, 1988.

== Description and history ==
The town of Winter Harbor, Maine occupies the southwestern portion of the Schoodic Peninsula, which juts into the Gulf of Maine east of Mount Desert Island. Its harbor is located on the western side of the larger peninsular, between its southernmost tip and a shorter peninsula that extends south from its western coast. Mark Island is a small island, 2.75 acres (1.11 ha) in size that is the southernmost island of a line extending south from the tip of this western peninsula. The light station occupies the entire island.

The light station includes four structures, of which the main one is the tower and keeper's house. The tower, built in 1856, is a round brick structure topped by an original octagonal lantern house with an iron walkway and railing around it. A brick single-story workroom projects from the tower, and is connected to the house by a shed-roofed wood-frame ell. The keeper's house is a two-story wood-frame structure, which was built in 1876 (along with the ell) to replace the original keeper's house. The property's other buildings are a small wooden shed of unknown construction date, a small brick oilhouse built in 1905, and a boathouse built in 1878.

The light went into service in 1856, operating with a fifth-order Fresnel lens, acting as an aid to navigation for the local fishing fleet. The light was decommissioned in 1934 and sold into private hands. The property remains in private hands, and the light is inactive.

== See also ==
- National Register of Historic Places listings in Hancock County, Maine
- List of lighthouses in Maine
