= Boresight =

Boresight may refer to:

- Antenna boresight, the optical axis of a directional antenna
- Boresight (firearm), adjustments made to an optical sight, to align the barrel of a firearm with the sights
- Boresight point, also known as gun harmonisation, the alignment of weapons in an aircraft
- Project Boresight, a US radio direction finding system
