= Otter Cliffs Radio Station =

U.S. Navy radio receiver facility in Maine

- Acadia National Park, Hancock County, Maine
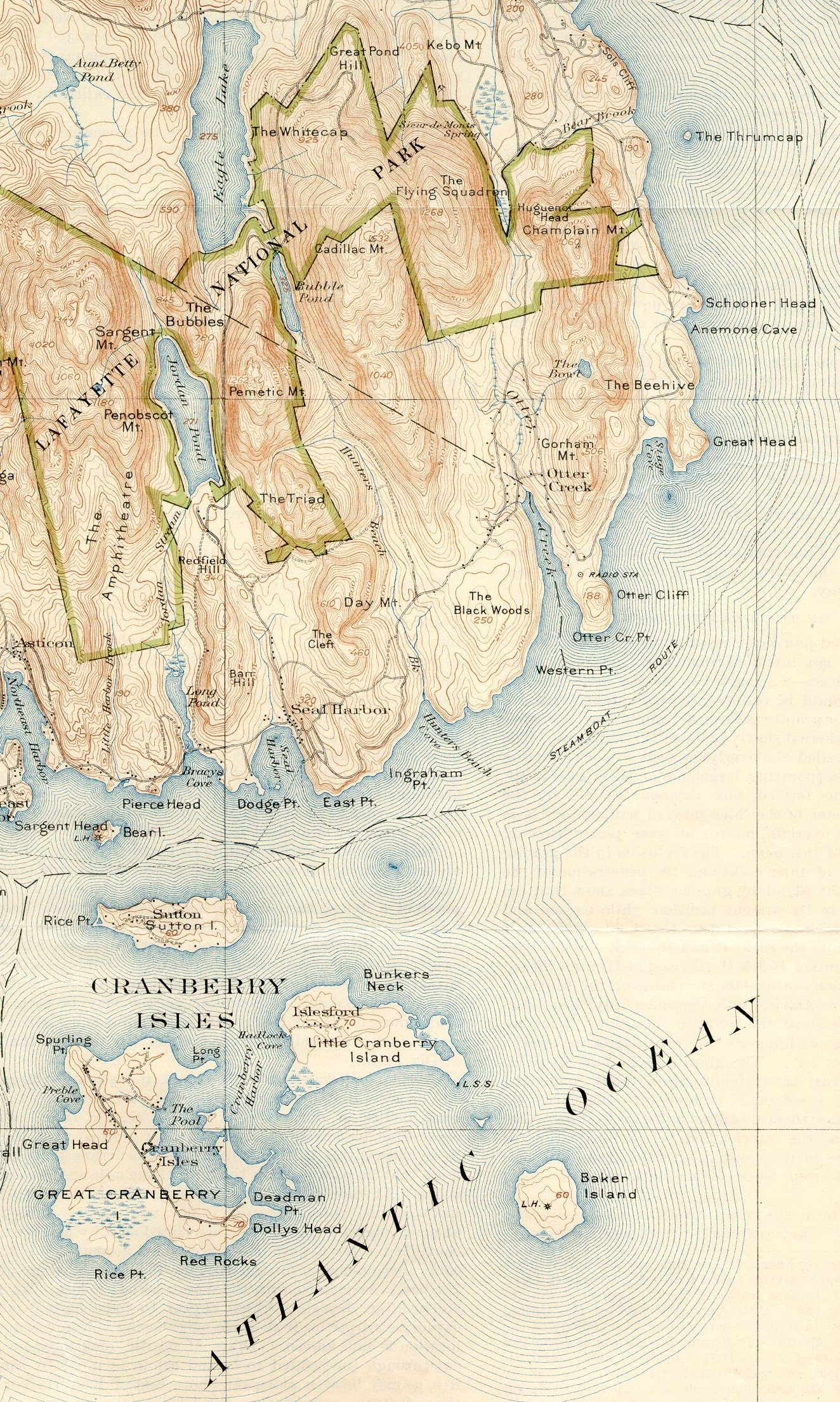
- Otter Cliffs Radio Station location, 1922

Site information
- Owner: National Park Service
- Controlled by: Acadia National Park
- Condition: Demolished

Location
- Coordinates: 44°18′45″N 68°11′36″W

Site history
- Built: 1917
- In use: 1935-2002

U.S. Naval Radio Station Otter Cliffs was a United States Navy radio receiver facility located in Acadia National Park on Mount Desert Island, south of Bar Harbor, Maine.

The station was commissioned on August 28, 1917, under the command of Lt. Alessandro Fabbri, who had personally cleared the land, built and equipped the station, and offered it to the government in exchange for a commission in the Naval Reserve and assignment as Officer-in-Charge. Prior to the war, Fabbri was a licensed radio amateur with the U.S. Government issued call sign 1AJ.

Otter Cliffs was the Navy's best transatlantic radio receiver site because of its absence of nearby man-made radio noise, its unobstructed ocean path from Europe, and the outstanding receivers, antennas and noise mitigation techniques developed by the Wireless Specialty Apparatus Company under the leadership of Greenleaf Whittier Pickard. Pickard is well known for his early inventions in connection with loop aerials, direction-finding systems and static mitigating devices used at Otter Cliffs during the war. His technical achievements and illustrations of equipment at Otter Cliffs during the war were documented in detail in the Proceedings of the IRE.

Edmond Bruce, a Navy enlisted man, served as chief electrician for the transatlantic receiver during the war. He later became a widely recognized radio engineer and inventor.

By the end of the war, more than 100 Navy enlisted men and 25 Marines were assigned to the station. By 1933, however, its buildings had become dilapidated and Navy funds were not forthcoming for repairs. When John D. Rockefeller Jr. suggested that it be removed, the Navy agreed to include the station in his donation to Acadia National Park, provided that he would build an equally good receiving station nearby. He did so at the tip of the Schoodic Peninsula, about five miles away across Frenchman Bay. On February 28, 1935, Otter Cliffs was decommissioned and the new Winter Harbor station was commissioned. The Winter Harbor station later became Naval Security Group Activity, Winter Harbor, and on July 1, 2002, was decommissioned and transferred to the National Park Service.

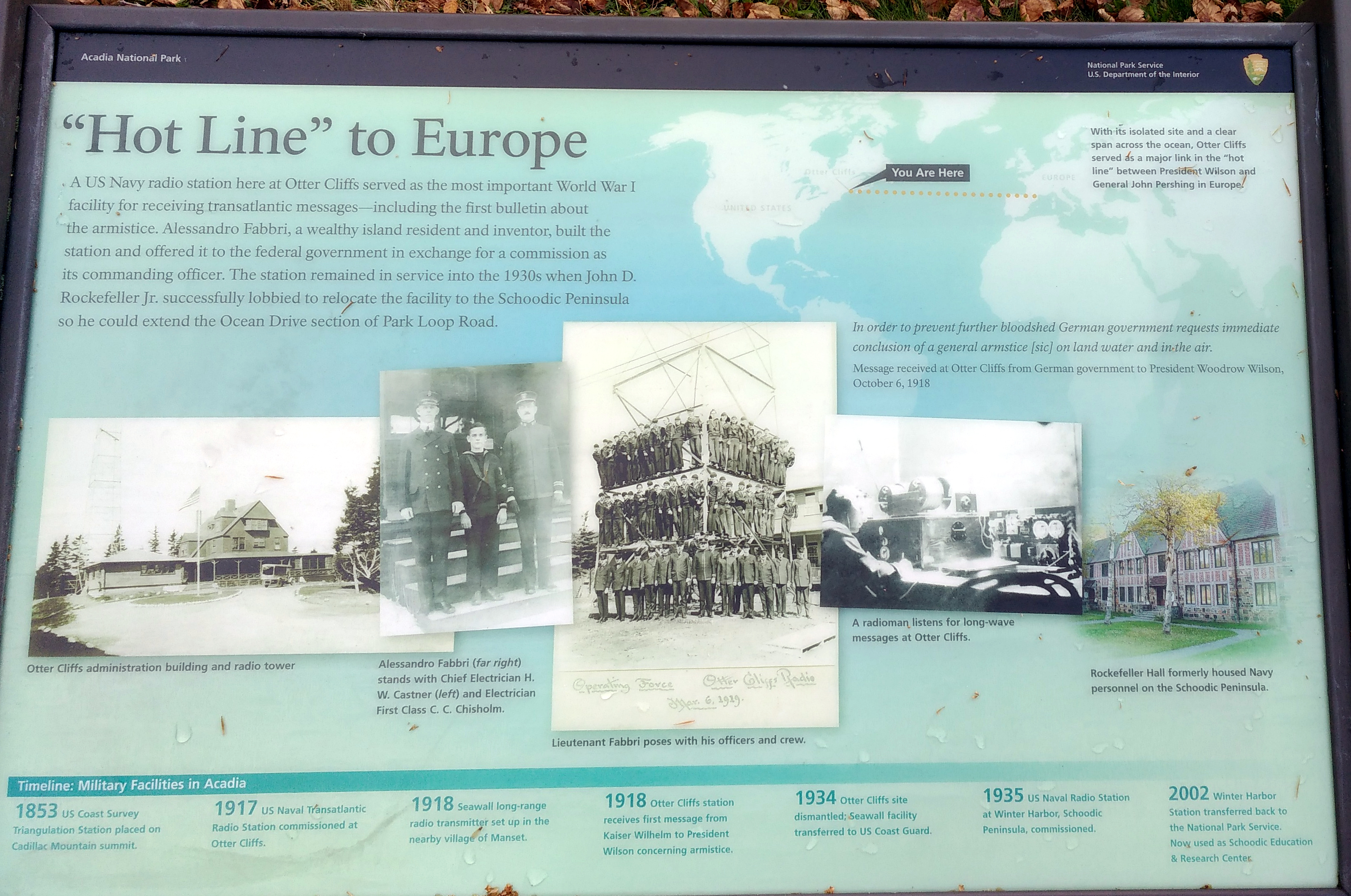
National Park Service wayside exhibit about the Otter Cliffs Radio Station, located in the Fabbri Picnic Area of Acadia National Park

== See also ==
- Edmond Bruce
