= Naval Security Group Activity, Winter Harbor =

- Part of Naval Security Group
- Winter Harbor, Maine
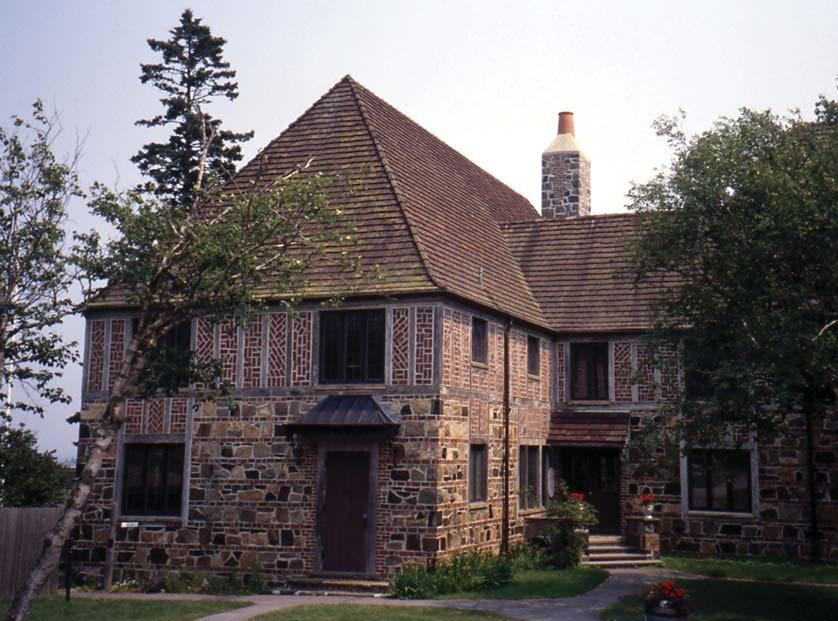
- The "Rockefeller Building" at the former station

Site information
- Owner: National Park Service
- Controlled by: Acadia National Park
- Condition: Standing

Location
- Location within Maine
- Coordinates: 44.338°N 68.062°W

Site history
- Built: 1935
- In use: 1935–2002

Garrison information
- Current commander: James W. Guest
- Garrison: Big Moose Island, Maine
- Occupants: Branch Medical Clinic, Winter Harbor; Customer Service Desk, Winter Harbor Maine; Naval Satellite Operations Center Detachment Alfa; Naval Security Support Group Detachment Two; Defense Commissary Agency, Winter Harbor, Maine; Navy Exchange, Winter Harbor, Maine
- U.S. Naval Radio Station- Apartment Building and Power House
- U.S. National Register of Historic Places
- Built: 1935
- Architect: Grosvenor Atterbury
- Architectural style: Rustic Norman
- NRHP reference No.: 13000533
- Added to NRHP: 5 July 2013

Naval Security Group Activity, Winter Harbor was a radio station of the United States Navy that operated from 1935 to 2002.

== History ==
In the early 1930s, Otter Cliffs Radio Station on Mount Desert Island was literally falling apart. John D. Rockefeller Jr., then developing the infrastructure of Acadia National Park, sought to locate the park's main loop road through the Otter Cliffs area. The Navy was willing to meet Rockefeller halfway on the removal of the radio station from Otter Cliffs, agreeing to relocate if a suitable site could be found on the coast within 50 miles (80 km) of Otter Cliffs. Big Moose Island, at the tip of Schoodic Peninsula about 5 miles (8.0 km) across the mouth of Frenchman Bay from Otter Cliffs, was determined to be an ideal location for the relocated radio station, and agreement was reached between the Navy, Interior Department, and Rockefeller for the relocation.

Rockefeller, wishing the station's buildings to be compatible with others designed for the park, retained Grosvenor Atterbury, the New York architect who designed the park's gatehouses, to come up with plans for the radio station. Atterbury's plan for the new station included a beautiful residence hall similar to Mr. Rockefeller's residence at Seal Harbor. Artisans from all over the world contributed to the project. This building, and the adjacent power station which was also designed by Atterbury, were listed on the National Register of Historic Places in 2013.

On 28 February 1935, the U.S. Navy Radio and Direction Finding Station Winter Harbor was officially commissioned with Chief Radioman Max Gunn in charge of a complement of an 11 personnel crew.

The station's name has changed several times over the years. In 1944, it was changed to Supplementary Radio Station, U.S. Naval Radio Station Winter Harbor. In 1950, it became known as U.S. Naval Radio Station (Receiver). The present station name, Naval Security Group Activity, Winter Harbor, became official on 9 June 1958.

In 2001, the base transitioned from an operational posture to focusing on the closure process, with the ultimate goal of transferring the Schoodic parcel to the National Park Service. The last System Maintenance Training Course graduated in July 2001. The AN/FRD-10 Wullenweber Antenna and Classic Wizard antennas came down in August. The last service was held at the Chapel 2 September 2001, and the Foc'sle Galley served its last meal on 28 September 2001.

== Redevelopment ==
After the base was closed in 2002, the National Park Service (NPS) acquired the land and established the Schoodic Education and Research Center (SERC). The SERC campus is managed by the nonprofit Schoodic Institute and the NPS in a public-private partnership as one of 19 NPS research learning centers in the country. The center is dedicated to supporting scientific research in the park, providing professional development for teachers, and educating students who will become the next generation of park stewards.

== Commanders ==
- Radio Direction Finding Station:CRM M. C. Gunn, CRM O. C. Coonce, CRM F. L. Freeman, CRM J. W. Pearson, CRM/LTJG M. C. Gunn, LTJG L. A. Lankford
- Supplementary Naval Station:LTJG H. I. Maltz, CRE L. A. Newbury, LTJG M. C. Gunn, LTJG C. M. Smith, LCDR H. L. Kisner
- Naval Radio Station (Receiver):LCDR F. V. Mason, CDR K. B. Kohler, CDR S. E. Hazelett, LCDR I. E. Willis, LCDR M. C. Morris, LCDR J. L. Koon
- Naval Group Support Activity:LCDR J. L. Koon, CDR T. J. Quick, CDR C. G. Lawrence, CDR S. T. Faulkner, CDR T. F. Hahn, CDR H. J. Davis, CDR J. F. Williamson, LCDR D. K. Layman, CDR G. C. Lawrence Montgomery Jr., CAPT J. D. Wood Jr., CAPT A. D. McEachen III, CAPT M. J. Whelan Jr., CAPT R. K. Lunde, CAPT T. F. Stevens, CAPT E. R. Dittmer, CAPT H. W. Whiton, CAPT J. T. Mitchell, CDR E. J. Kurzanski, CDR S. K. Tucker, CDR M. S. Rogers, CDR E. F. Williamson, CDR J. W. Guest

== See also ==
- National Register of Historic Places listings in Hancock County, Maine
- National Register of Historic Places listings in Acadia National Park
