= Edmond Bruce =

- Born: September 28, 1899; St. Louis, Missouri, United States
- Died: November 28, 1973 (aged 74)
- Education: George Washington University; Massachusetts Institute of Technology
- Awards: IEEE Morris N. Liebmann Memorial Award (1932)
- Engineering career
- Discipline: Radio-frequency engineering
- Institutions: Bell Labs; Western Electric
- Projects: Bruce foil Bruce array Rhombic antenna

Edmond Bruce (September 28, 1899 – November 28, 1973) was an American radio pioneer best known for creating the rhombic antenna and Bruce array.

Bruce was born in Saint Louis, Missouri, and raised in Cambridge, Massachusetts, Brooklyn, and Washington, D.C. In 1917 he left high school to join the Navy and was eventually chief radio electrician in the transatlantic communication service, serving at the Otter Cliffs Radio Station in Bar Harbor, Maine. He then studied at George Washington University, 1919, and at Massachusetts Institute of Technology, 1920–1924, from which he received his bachelor's degree in electrical communication. From 1921 to 1923 he also worked for Melville Eastham's Clapp-Eastham Company.

In 1924 he joined the Western Electric Company, and in 1925 became a research engineer at Bell Telephone Laboratories, where he helped develop short-wave radio receivers and field strength measuring equipment, and designed directional antennas for short-wave radio communication, including his celebrated rhombic antenna (1931). Karl Jansky used a steerable Bruce array in his earliest radio astronomy experiments, also in 1931.

Bruce received the 1932 IEEE Morris N. Liebmann Memorial Award "for his theoretical investigations and field developments in the domain of directional antennas", and the Franklin Institute's 1935 Longstreth Award for inventing the rhombic antenna.

Bruce was also an avid sailor and frequent contributor to the Amateur Yacht Research Society (A.Y.R.S). He co-authored a landmark book with fellow sailor and AYRS member, Henry (Harry) A. Morss Jr., Design for Fast Sailing which was finished months before his death, being published posthumously in 1976. In sailing circles, he is best known for popularizing what has become known as the 'Bruce foil', a canted leeboard (hydrofoil) set at some distance athwartships within an outrigger to function as both a heeling stabilizer and simultaneously offsetting the lateral sail force with a lateral plane. Bruce noted that if the hydrofoil's angle from the horizontal was 45°, the horizontal distance of the board's center of resistance from the hull's centerline just equals the height of the sail's center of effort above the hydrofoil's center of resistance. If located closer to the hull, the hydrofoil would be angled more horizontally, as can be seen on modern America's Cup boats. The concept of an inclined leeboard has been recorded in a patent by M. and T. A. McIntyre on Oct. 19, 1920, however it was Bruce's explanation through the AYRS that brought it into the sailing public's perception.

== Patents ==
- Patent 1,813,143
- Patent 1,899,410
- Patent 1,910,147
- Patent 1,916,358
- Patent 2,145,024
- Patent 2,193,578
- Patent 2,239,775
- Patent 2,283,148
- Patent 2,285,565
- Patent 2,594,389
- Patent 2,970,310
- Patent 2,976,367

== Selected works ==
- Bruce, E., Beck, A.C., Lowry, L.R., "Horizontal Rhombic Antennas", Proceedings of the IRE, volume 23, issue 1, Jan. 1935, pages 24–46.
- Bruce, E., Morss, H.A., edited by Morwood, J., "Design for Fast Sailing - Research Afloat and Ashore", The Amateur Yacht Research Society, 1976

== Sources ==
- Proceedings of the IRE, 1932
- Author biograph, Proceedings of the Institute of Radio Engineers, Volume 23, Number 1. January 1935.
- Genealogical record
