= 95th Street (Manhattan) =

West-east street in Manhattan, New York

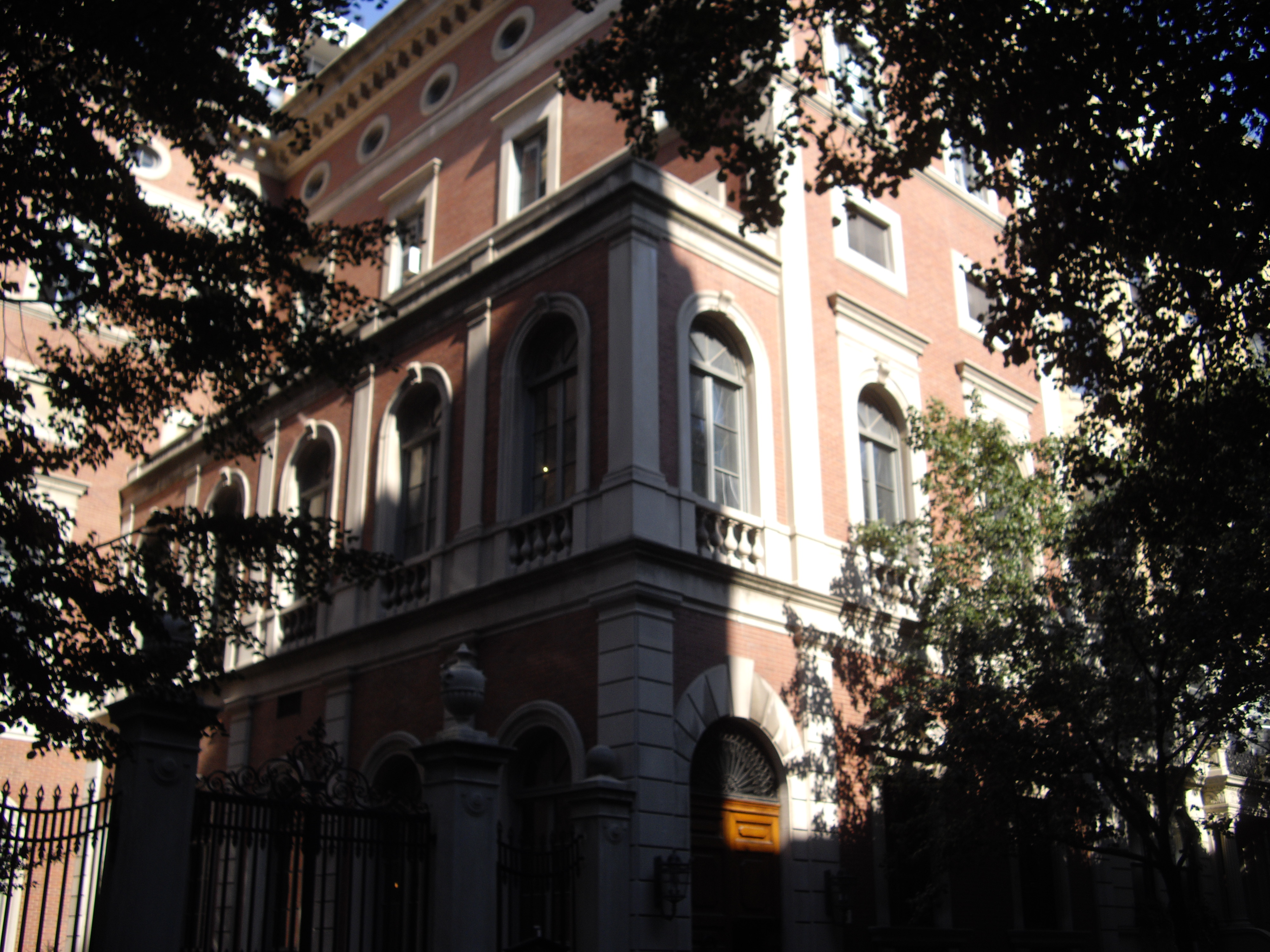
- The Edith Fabbri House (now House of the Redeemer) in 2008, located at Fifth Avenue and East 95th Street
- Maintained by: NYCDOT
- Length: 1.3 mi (2.1 km)
- Width: 60 feet (18.29 m)
- Location: Manhattan
- Coordinates: 40°47′14″N 73°57′21″W
- West end: Riverside Drive in Upper West Side
- East end: First Avenue in Yorkville
- North: 96th Street
- South: 94th Street

Construction
- Commissioned: 1811

95th Street runs from Riverside Drive, overlooking the Hudson River, to the East River, through the New York City borough of Manhattan. It traverses the neighborhoods of Upper West Side, Upper East Side, Carnegie Hill, and Yorkville; the street is interrupted by Central Park.

As an odd-numbered street, most of 95th Street handles westbound automotive traffic. However, it has eastbound traffic between Amsterdam Avenue and its western terminus, facilitating traffic exiting the Henry Hudson Parkway (NY 9A) at exit 11.

== Notable buildings ==
- The 1926 Byzantine Revival facade of Congregation Ohab Zedek between Amsterdam and Columbus Avenue
- The 1916 House of the Redeemer, one of the finest Italian Renaissance revival-styled townhouses in New York, is located at 7 East 95th Street.
- The two blocks that run between Central Park West and Amsterdam Avenues are notable for particularly fine and eclectic town houses. The Gothic "Claude A. Vissani House" at 143 W. 95th is particularly interesting. Other nearby homes are done in a variety of Classical, Renaissance, and eclectic styles.
