= Jacob Knowles =

American lobsterman and social media content creator

- Born: Jacob Knowles; August 31, 1993 (age 33); Maine, United States
- Occupations: Lobsterman and content creator

Instagram information
- Page: jknowles831
- Followers: 891 thousand (May 17, 2025)

TikTok information
- Page: Jacob Knowles
- Followers: 3.3 million

YouTube information
- Channel: Jacob Knowles
- Subscribers: 2.4 million
- Views: 1.6 billion

Jacob Knowles is an American lobsterman and social media content creator based in Winter Harbor, Maine. A fifth-generation lobsterman, he documents his work and sustainable fishing practices through videos shared on platforms like TikTok, Instagram, and YouTube, where he has amassed a following.

== Early life ==
Knowles is from Winter Harbor, Maine, a small fishing village known for its lobstering industry. He is a fifth-generation lobsterman, part of a family tradition extending back several generations in Winter Harbor and neighboring harbors. He first went lobstering with his father at the age of four or five. Knowles’ family members were also involved in lobstering. His mother joined him on the boat during his early years. He has a twin sister, who is not involved in lobstering but is married to a lobsterman.

By the age of 13, Knowles acquired his first skiff, which allowed him to start lobstering with 150 traps. This early experience was primarily educational but also introduced him to the business aspects of lobstering. During his teenage years, he gradually upgraded his equipment and boats. By the time he was 16, he was running his own crew and managing his operations independently.

== Career ==
Knowles has been a full-time lobsterman for most of his life, beginning as a teenager. His work typically involves early morning starts and long days managing hundreds of lobster traps off the coast of Maine. Lobstering remains his primary occupation, although he has also leveraged his expertise and daily experiences into a social media presence.

In 2020, Knowles posted a TikTok video explaining the sustainable practice of notching the tails of egg-bearing female lobsters to ensure their protection and sustainability for future generations. The video went viral and marked a turning point in his transition to becoming a social media content creator. Since then, he has gained millions of followers across platforms, including TikTok, Instagram, and YouTube.

He creates videos documenting his daily life as a lobsterman, offering insights into sustainable fishing practices, lobster biology, and the challenges of the trade. His videos often feature unique or rare lobsters, demonstrations of traditional fishing techniques, and interactions with his crew.

Knowles' social media success has led to sponsorships with brands such as BetterHelp and CapCut. He uses earnings from these partnerships to support his family and crew, which includes a videographer added in 2023.

He has discussed the physical demands and risks of lobstering, including the dangers of being caught in ropes and the challenges posed by Maine’s limited-entry licensing system.

== Personal life ==
Knowles is married and has three children. His family life is closely connected to his career, and he occasionally brings his children aboard his boat to share the experience. He has expressed a desire to pass on his knowledge and tradition to his children, while leaving the choice of pursuing lobstering to them.

In his spare time, Knowles enjoys hunting, fishing, and flying his plane.
