= Winter Harbor 21 =

One-design racing sloop by Burgess & Packard

Specifications
LOA	30'8"
LWL	21'3"
Draft	5' 2"
Beam	7'3"
Main and Jib Sail Area	500 sq ft (46 m^{2}).

A Winter Harbor 21 (also known as a Winter Harbor Knockabout) is a 31′0″ x 7′3″ one-design racing sloop designed and built by Burgess & Packard, of Marblehead, Massachusetts, in 1907.

== History ==
In 1906, Fredrick O. Spedden and George Dallas Dixon Jr., members of Maine's Winter Harbor Yacht Club commissioned Starling Burgess and his partner, Alpheus A. Packard to create a one-design racing sloop for the club. Their firm, Burgess & Packard, produced the Winter Harbor 21, a knockabout. Seven boats were built by Burgess & Packard and launched in 1907. Two more boats were built by George Lawley & Son in 1920 and 1924, bringing the total fleet to 9.

During World War II and the 1950s, the fleet was gradually sold and dispersed until only El Fitz and one other knockabout remained active at the Winter Harbor Yacht Club.

In 1979, Alan Goldstein, commodore of the Winter Harbor Yacht Club, decided while sailing on one of the two remaining boats that he wanted one of his own. It took him two years of diligent searching before he discovered the boat Cloverly in poor condition rotting in a barn. After extensive rebuilding there were three Winter Harbor 21s racing once more in Winter Harbor. It took ten more years before the remaining six sloops had been found, restored and returned to Winter Harbor.

It's thought that the Winter Harbor 21s are the oldest intact one-design racing sailboat fleet in the United States.

== Boats and owners ==
- Name – Year Built – color – owner
- Mystery – 1907 – pink – Dexter Coffin family
- Whippet – 1907 – white – Samuel Heffner Family – restored by Benjamin River Marine, Brooklyn, Maine
- Cloverly – 1907 – maroon – Dan Gans
- Riddle – 1907 – green – Chas Wiggins
- Water Witch – 1907 – yellow – Dexter Coffin Family – restored by Redd's Pond Boatworks and Marblehead Trading Company, Marblehead, Massachusetts
- Rambler II – 1907 – gray – Ben Irons
- Sphinx – 1907 – red-orange – Alex Mishkin
- Sole – 1922 – blue – Edith Dixon
- El Fitz – 1924 – varnish – Hilary Dixon Miller
