= Edith Fabbri House =

Historic house in Manhattan, New York

Coordinates: 40°47′13.5″N 73°57′19″W

Edith Fabbri House in 2026

The Edith Fabbri House is an Italian Renaissance revival-style townhouse that is located at 7 East 95th Street on New York City's Upper East Side.

== History ==
Designed by architect Grosvenor Atterbury and completed in 1916 for Edith Shepard (a daughter of Margaret Louisa Vanderbilt and Elliott Fitch Shepard) and her husband Ernesto Giuseppi Fabbri Jr. (brother of Alessandro Fabbri), the house was constructed around Shepard and Fabbri's architectural piece collection.

The highlight of the house is its library, which showcases historic panels from the Palazzo Ducale di Urbino in Italy. The library also includes an Aeolian Opus 1398 organ from 1916.

The home was deeded to the Episcopal Church in 1949, and it now serves as a retreat house under the name of "The House of the Redeemer". The mansion became a New York City Designated Landmark on July 23, 1974.

== See also ==
- List of New York City Designated Landmarks in Manhattan from 59th to 110th Streets
