= Alessandro Fabbri (naval officer) =

American naval officer

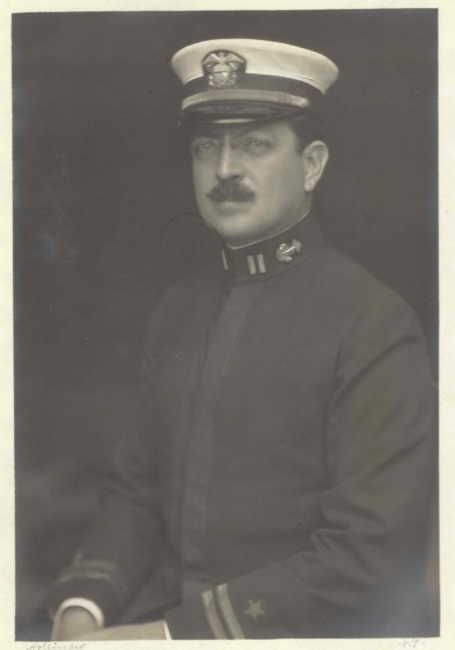
- Pictured around 1919
- Born: May 26, 1877; Manhattan, New York, U.S.
- Died: February 6, 1922 (aged 44); Manhattan, New York, U.S.
- Resting place: Vanderbilt Family Cemetery and Mausoleum
- Monuments: Fabbri Memorial in Acadia National Park
- Known for: Otter Cliffs Radio Station
- Call sign: 1AJ
- Honours: Navy Cross

Alessandro Fabbri (May 21, 1877 – February 6, 1922) was both the builder and the commanding officer of the Otter Cliffs Radio Station, a United States Navy facility that was important during World War I. He was awarded the Navy Cross for exceptionally meritorious service.

Before the U.S. entered the war, The New York Times reported that Alessandro and his brother, Ernesto Giuseppi Fabbri Jr., were under investigation by the U.S. government, suspected of using radio equipment to assist German spies. Upon publication of a vigorous response from Ernesto, the newspaper clarified that the government had been investigating radio operators in general, not targeting the Fabbris specifically.

== Early life ==
Fabbri was born in Manhattan, New York City, in 1877 to Ernesto Fabbri I and Sara Anna Randall. He spent most of his childhood in Italy but was educated at Westminster School in Simsbury, Connecticut.

His brother, Ernesto, and uncle, Egisto Paolo Fabbri, were associate and partner, respectively, of J.P. Morgan & Co. Ernesto Jr. and family owned the Bar Harbor "cottage" Buonriposo. The Fabbris' Manhattan home was at 7 East 95th Street.

== Personal life ==
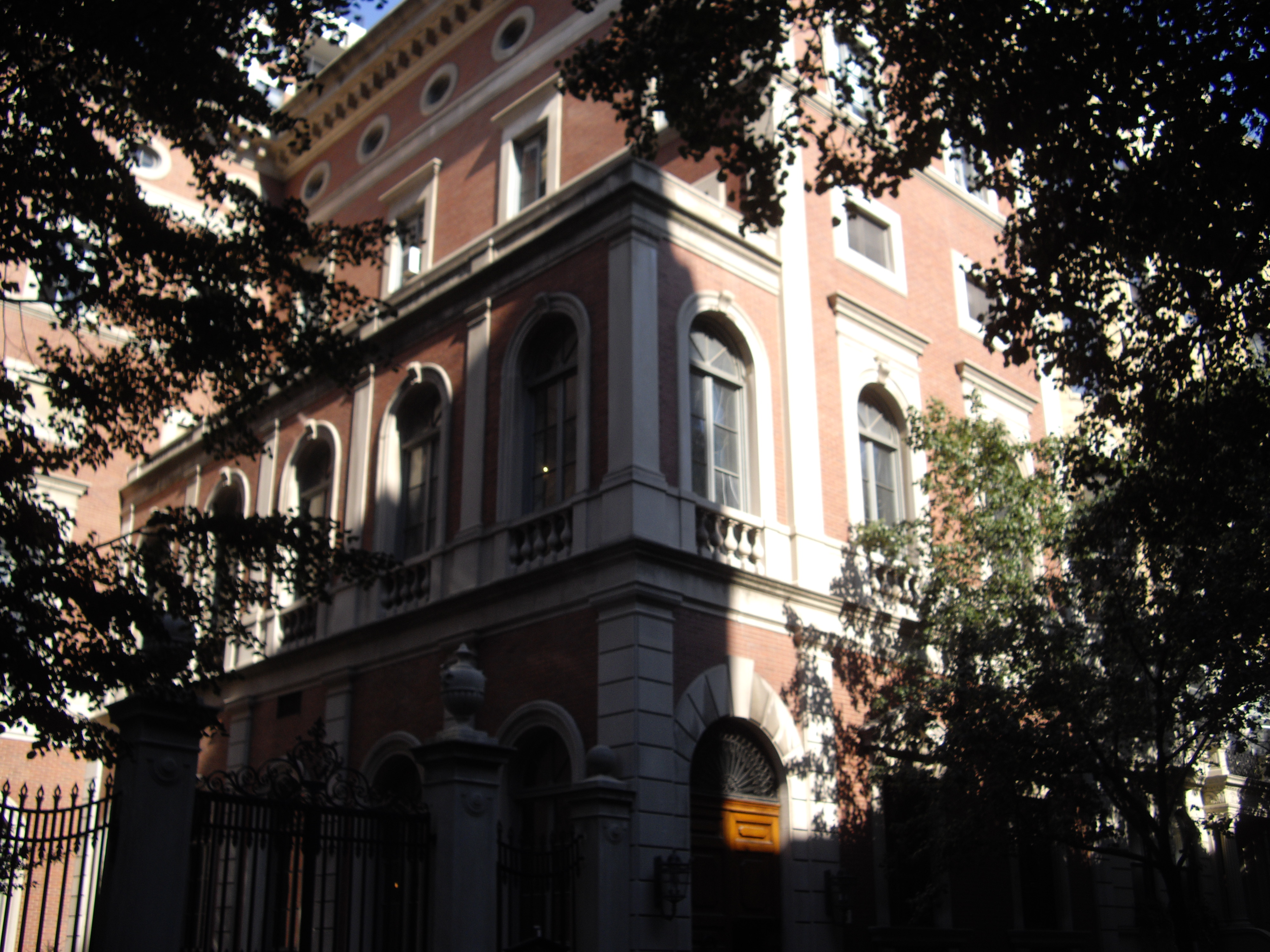
The Fabbris' family home in Manhattan, 7 East 95th Street

Fabbri once owned the second-largest auxiliary ketch in the United States. Named Ajax, it was 123 feet (37 m) long. It was built by F. C. Adams in East Boothbay, Maine.

== Death ==
Fabbri died of pneumonia in Manhattan in 1922, aged 44. He had been hunting in Long Island's Great South Bay when he fell ill. He was interred in the Vanderbilt Family Cemetery. He was remembered as a scientist who also "achieved distinction as a naturalist, hunter, yachtsman, explorer and inventor."

=== Fabbri Memorial ===
The heavily travelled Park Loop Road of Acadia National Park passes between a small memorial to Fabbri and a picnic area that bears his name, at or near the former site of the radio station. The inscription reads:

In memory of Alessandro Fabbri, 1877–1922, Lieutenant U.S.N.R.F. A resident and lover of Mount Desert Island who commanded the United States naval radio station upon this site from its establishment on August 28, 1917 until December 12, 1919. At the end of the world war he was awarded the Navy Cross. His citation stated that under his direction the station became "the most important and the most efficient station in the world." This tablet is erected by his friends and fellow townsmen in testimony to his patriotic service, high character and endearing qualities. 1939

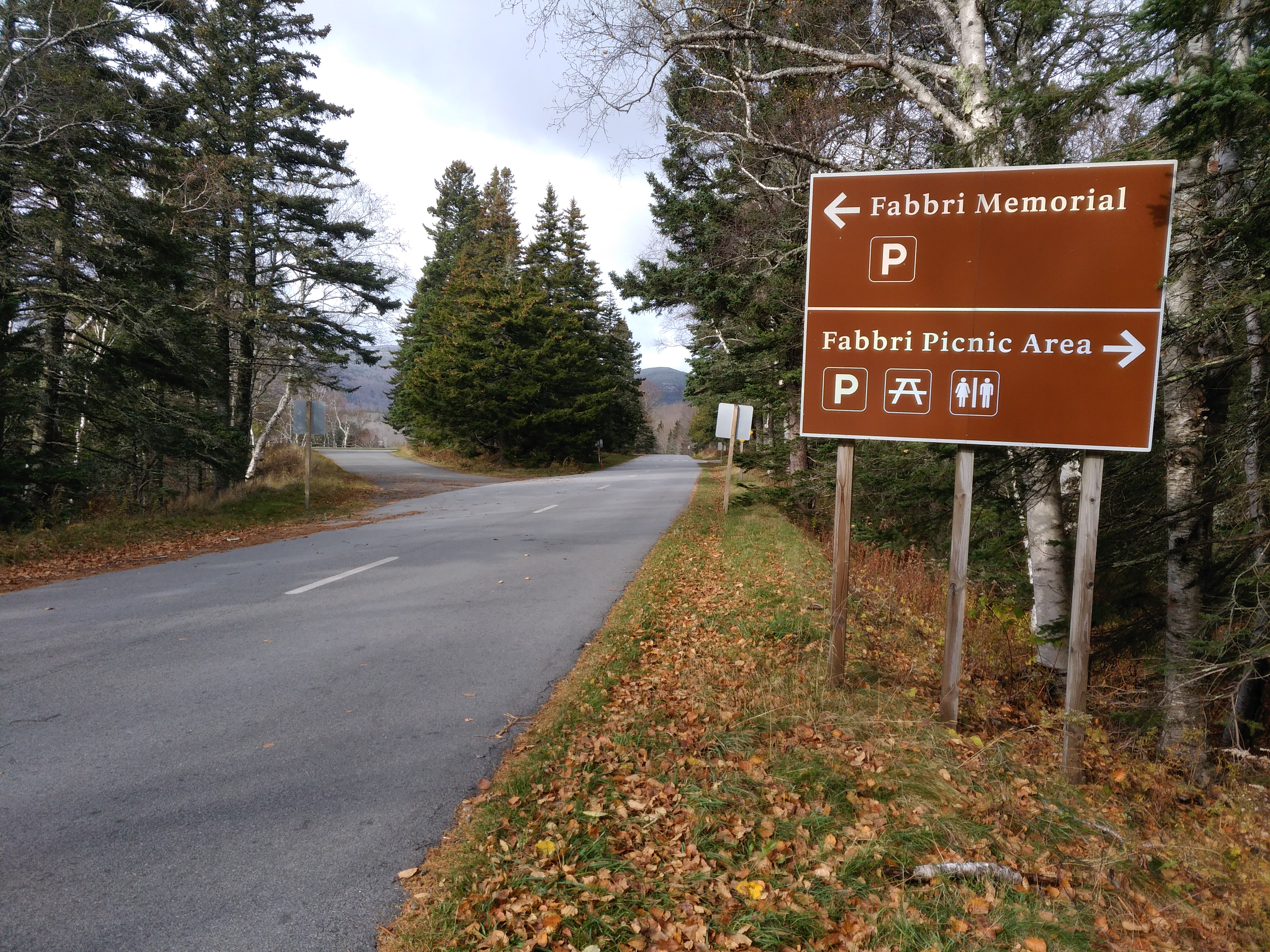
Loop Road approach to Fabbri Memorial and Fabbri Picnic Area.

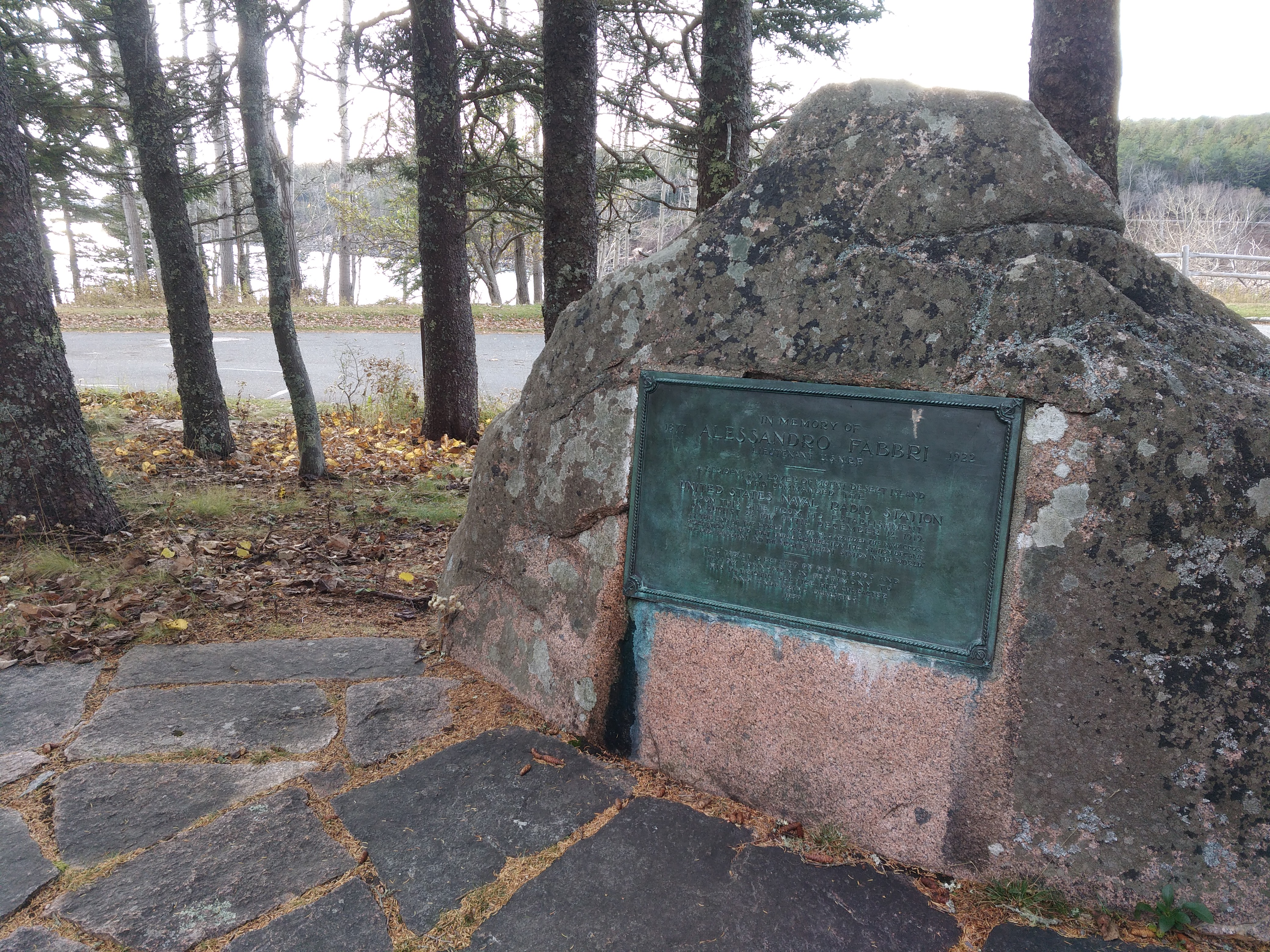
Fabbri Memorial overlooking Otter Cove.
