= Schoodic Peninsula =

Coordinates: 44.42608°N 68.05336°W

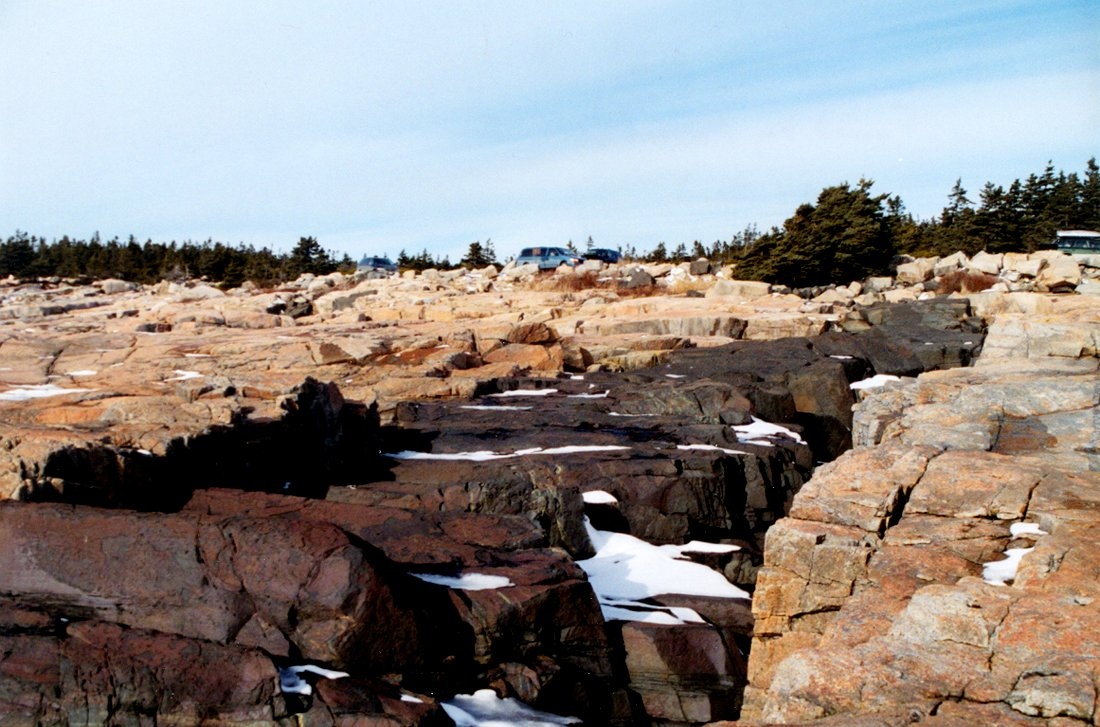
Ancient magma flows formed this black dike at Schoodic Head.

The Schoodic Peninsula is a peninsula in Down East Maine. It is located four miles (6 km) east of Bar Harbor, Maine, as the crow flies. The Schoodic Peninsula contains 2,266 acres (9 km^{2}), or approximately 5% of Acadia National Park. It includes the towns of Gouldsboro and Winter Harbor. The peninsula has a rocky granite shoreline containing many volcanic dikes. The peninsula is home to the former United States Navy base, NSGA Winter Harbor, which has been converted into a National Park Service training center. A 3,300-acre (13 km^{2}) resort development was proposed for land abutting Schoodic Peninsula's national park holdings to the north. An anonymous donor eventually bought the entire 3,200-acre tract and built the Schoodic Woods Campground and miles of gravel bike paths before donating all of it to Acadia National Park. Opening in 2015, Schoodic Woods is the newest campground in Acadia National Park, and the first built in the park since the original campgrounds were built by the Civilian Conservation Corps during the Great Depression beginning in 1936. In the summer, the Schoodic peninsula is currently served by two separate ferry services from Bar Harbor to Winter Harbor that run daily.

== Acadia National Park ==
- Schoodic Peninsula Historic District
- U.S. National Register of Historic Places
- U.S. Historic district
- Location within Maine Location within the United States
- Nearest city: Winter Harbor, Maine
- Area: 1,083 acres (438 ha)
- Built: 1929
- Architect: National Park Service
- Architectural style: National Park Service Rustic
- MPS: Acadia National Park MPS
- NRHP reference No.: 07000614, updated to 100001261
- Added to NRHP: June 29, 2007

The section of Acadia National Park on the Schoodic Peninsula is more secluded than the main body of the Park, located on Mount Desert Island; approximately 10% of visitors make the trip to the peninsula. The island is easily visible across Frenchman Bay, but the trip by road from Bar Harbor around the bay to the peninsula is 45 miles (72 km) long, about one hour by car. Ferry service is available seven days a week from late June through September, with ferry trips taking one hour.

The park is accessible via a one-way 7-mile (11 km) long loop road. The main feature is Schoodic Head, the highest point on the peninsula at 440 feet (130 m) above sea level. A number of hiking trails ascend the head. Other features include the picnic area at Frazer Point, views of Schoodic Point, Blueberry Hill, and the Anvil. Many of the developed features of the park, including some of its hiking trails, service roads, and comfort stations, were built by crews of the Civilian Conservation Corps in the 1930s in the National Park Service's Rustic architectural style. More than 1,000 acres (400 ha) of the park were listed on the National Register of Historic Places in 2007 in recognition of this contribution.

The lighthouse viewable to the northwest of Schoodic Head, Mark Island's Winter Harbor Light Station, was named to the National Register of Historic Places in 1988.

== NSGA Winter Harbor ==
A United States Navy base, NSGA Winter Harbor, operated on Schoodic Point from 1935 to 2002. A replacement for Otter Cliffs Radio Station, the base operated as a radio station and training facility until it was decommissioned and transferred to the National Park Service on July 1, 2002. The former naval base has now been transformed into the Schoodic Education and Research Center, a research and training center for the National Park Service.

== Schoodic Woods Campground ==
The Schoodic Woods Campground is located on the mainland Schoodic Peninsula of Acadia National Park. It is the only campground located on the mainland of the national park and is about 3 miles southeast of Winter Harbor. The Schoodic Woods Campground is typically open from late May until October.

RVs and trailers are allowed in the campground but must be within the maximum length allowed. There are no showers at this campground but there are fire rings and grills available for guests to use. Setting, building, maintaining, attending, or using a campfire (including charcoal) is prohibited. Stoves and grills fueled by petroleum fuels such as Liquid Propane Gas (LPG), butane, or white gas are allowed.

== Winter Harbor Holdings development ==
In March 2008, Winter Harbor Holdings Inc. entered into negotiations with representatives from the towns of Winter Harbor and Gouldsboro regarding development plans for 3,300 acres (13 km^{2}) of land abutting the Schoodic portion of Acadia National Park. The proposed "eco-resort community" would be one third larger than the Schoodic section of park abutting it; proposals for development have included two hotels, housing developments, a bird sanctuary and an "eco-friendly golf course". Up to 1,000 homes could be built as part of the development; plans for a development airstrip were considered but rejected. Two thirds of the land would be set aside as a green corridor off-limits to commercial development; plans for this portion have included carriage roads like those on the Mount Desert Island section of Acadia National Park. The proposal also calls for a ban on gasoline-powered vehicles on the loop road in the Schoodic section of Acadia National Park; the loop road would be converted into a carriage road limited to human- and electric-powered vehicles. The project would develop 40% of the land within the borders of the town of Winter Harbor, and could increase its population by 25%. These plans have been the subject of controversy among local residents concerned about the effects of development on the environment and on local communities. Other controversies have come up regarding the identities of the Winter Harbor ownership group and their development activities in New Mexico. In December 2008, two Maine architectural firms that had been local partners of the Italian partnership group withdrew from the project, citing financial disputes and differences in philosophy over the nature of the project and community involvement.

== See also ==
- National Register of Historic Places in:
  - Hancock County, ME
  - Acadia National Park
