= Rhombic antenna =

Rhombus-shaped antenna

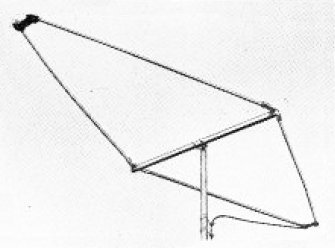
Small rhombic UHF television antenna from 1952. Its broad bandwidth allowed it to cover the 470 to 890 MHz UHF television band. Horizontal polarisation.

A rhombic antenna is a type of radio antenna made of four sections of wire suspended parallel to the ground in a diamond or "rhombus" shape.

These types of antenna were developed in the 1930s and widely used due to their simplicity and effectiveness at long-distance communication. However, rhombics have largely fallen out of favor as better alternatives were developed that required less space.

== Description ==
Each of the four antenna sides is the same length – about a quarter-wavelength to one wavelength per section – converging but not touching at an angle of about 42° at the fed end and at the far end. The length is not critical, typically from one to two wavelengths (λ), but there is an optimum angle for any given length and frequency. A horizontal rhombic antenna radiates horizontally polarized radio waves at a low elevation angle off the pointy ends of the antenna.

If the sections are joined by a resistor at either of the acute (pointy) ends, then the antenna will receive from and transmit to only the direction the end with the resistor points at. Its principal advantages over other types of antenna are its simplicity, high forward gain, wide bandwidth, and the ability to operate over a wide range of frequencies.

Diagram of radiation patterns (grey) of each segment of the antenna illustrates how it works. By using the correct vertex angle, one of the main lobes of each of the four sides point in the same direction, reinforcing each other, increasing the gain.

A rhombic antenna consists of one to several parallel wires suspended above the ground in a "rhombus" (diamond) shape. Long versions are typically supported by a pole or tower at each vertex to which the wires are attached by insulators. Each of the four sides is the same length. The length is not critical, typically from one to two wavelengths (λ) end-to-end, but for any given length and frequency, there is an optimum acute angle at which the sections should meet.

A horizontal rhombic antenna radiates horizontally polarized radio waves at a low elevation angle off the acute end of the antenna opposite the feedline. Its principal advantages over other types of antenna are its simplicity, high forward gain and wide bandwidth, the ability to operate over a wide range of frequencies.

It is typically fed at one of the two acute (sharper angle) vertices through a balanced transmission line, or alternatively a coaxial cable with a balun transformer. The end of the wires meeting at the opposite vertex is either left open (unconnected), or is terminated with a non-inductive resistor. When resistor-terminated, the radiation pattern is unidirectional, with the main lobe off the terminated end, so this end of the antenna is oriented toward the intended receiving station or region. When unterminated, the rhombic is bidirectional with two opposite lobes off the two acute ends, but is not perfectly bi-directional.

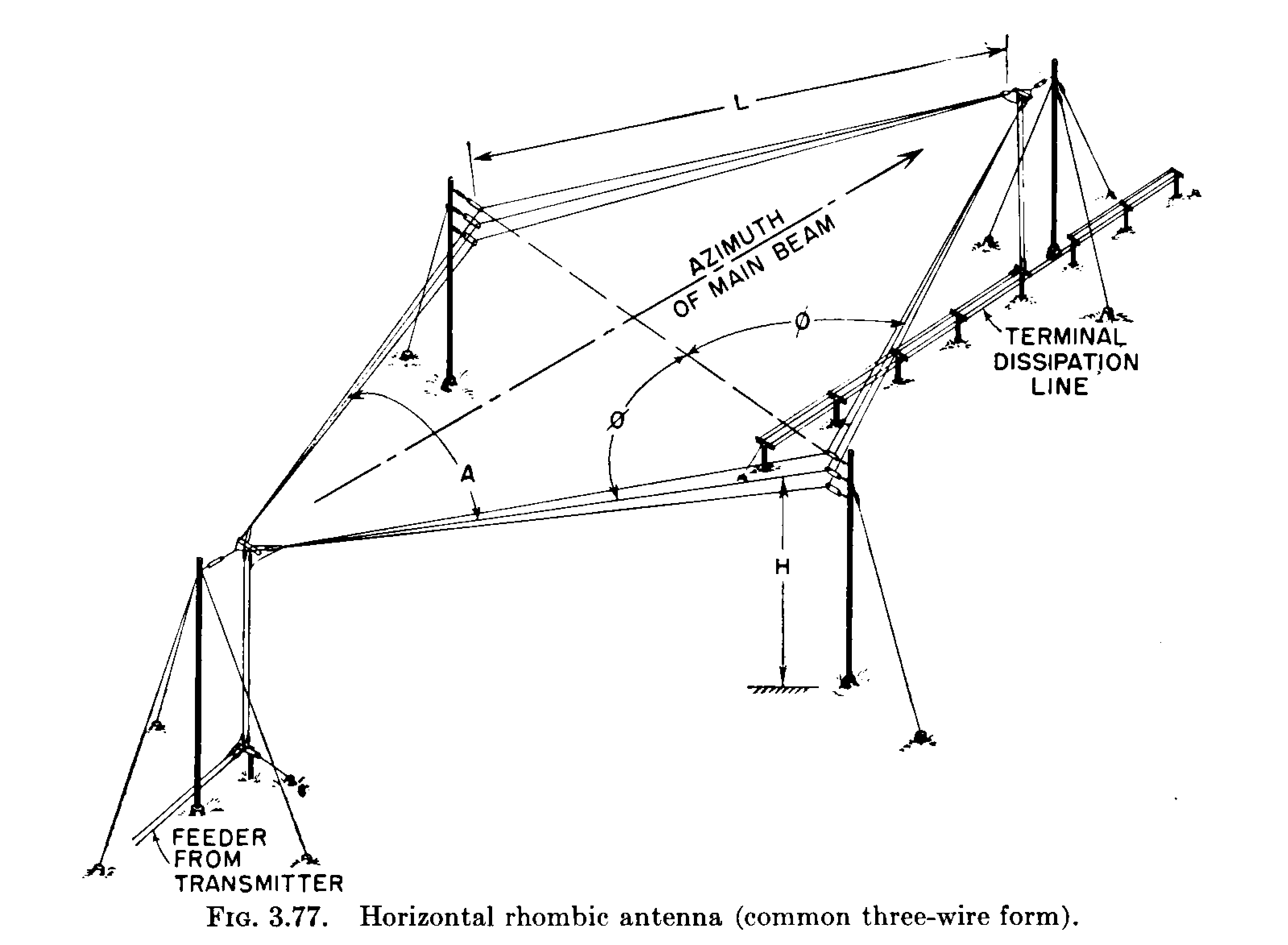
A horizontal three-wire rhombic antenna. This example is terminated with a resonant stub transmission line power reflector instead of a resistor to increase efficiency.

The rhombic antenna can radiate at elevation angles close to the horizon or at higher angles, depending on its height above ground relative to the operating frequency and its physical construction. Likewise, its beamwidth can be narrow or broad, depending primarily on its length. The shallow radiation angle makes it useful for skywave propagation, the longest distance mode for shortwave, in which radio waves directed into the sky at the horizon reflect from layers in the ionosphere and return to Earth far beyond the horizon.

It is possible to improve the low efficiency and gain of unidirectional rhombics by replacing the termination resistor by a low-loss balanced resonant stub transmission line. This reflects the power that would have been wasted in the termination resistor back into the antenna with the correct phase to reinforce the excitation from the transmitter. This circuit can increase the radiation efficiency of transmitting antennas to the 70-80% range, at the cost of increased complexity.

== History ==
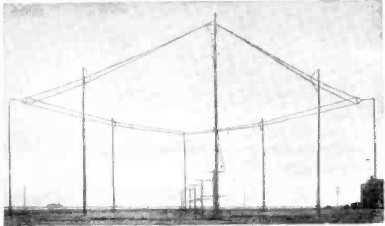
AT&T 2 wire rhombic in Dixon, California, in 1937, used for telephone service to Shanghai, China

The rhombic antenna was designed in 1931 by Edmond Bruce and Harald Friis, It was mostly commonly used in the high frequency (HF) or shortwave band as a broadband directional antenna.

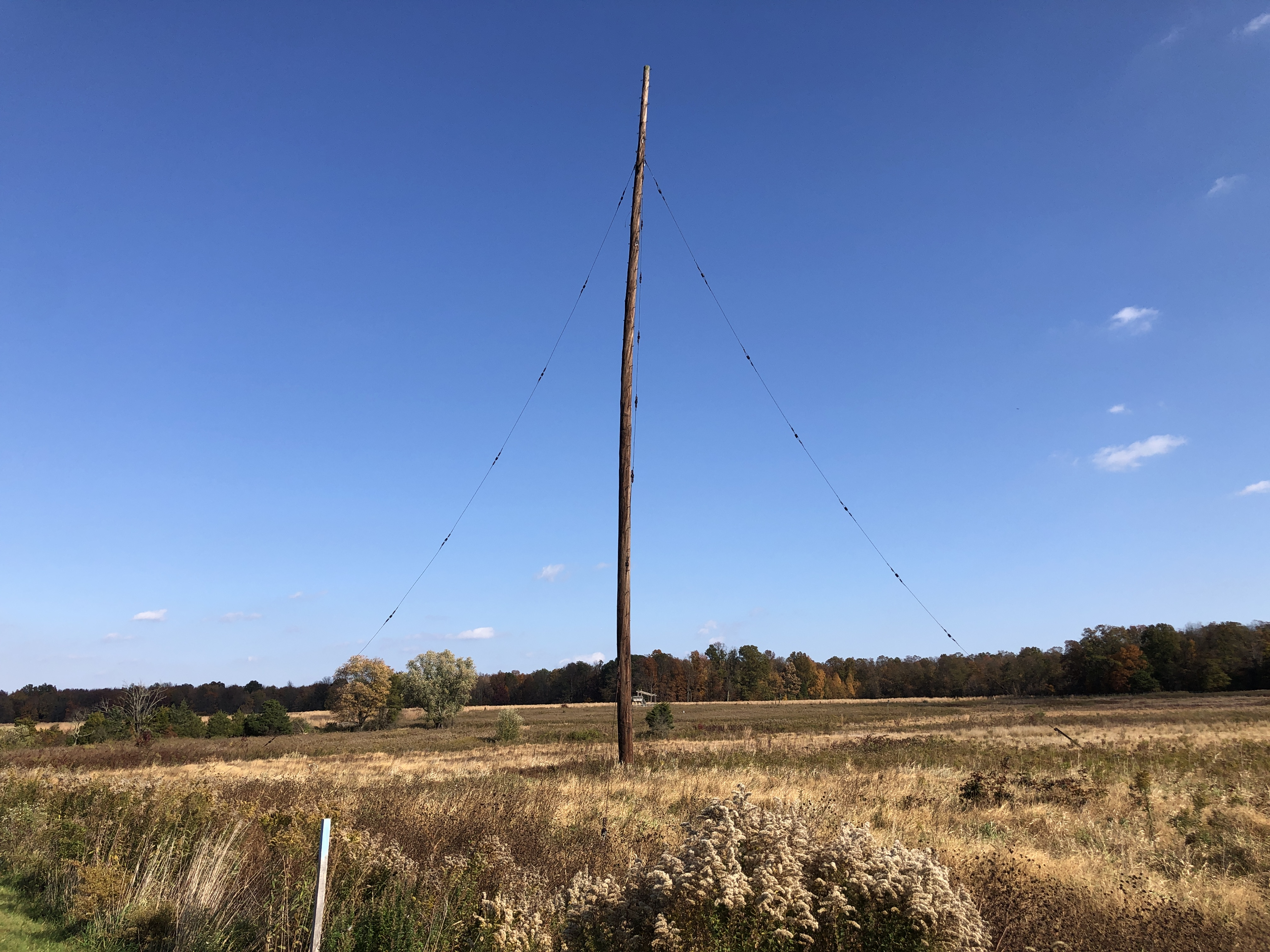
As of 2023, one last remnant pole still stands from the AT&T pole farm which was located in Mercer County, New Jersey

Prior to World War II, the rhombic was one of the most popular point-to-point high frequency antenna arrays. After World War II the rhombic largely fell out of favor for shortwave broadcast and point-to-point communications work, being replaced by log periodic antennas and curtain arrays. Larger log periodics provide wider frequency coverage with comparable gain to rhombics. Distributed feed curtains or HRS curtain arrays provided a cleaner pattern, ability to steer the pattern in elevation and azimuth, much higher efficiency, and significantly higher gain in less space. However, rhombic antennas are used in cases where the combination of high forward gain (despite the losses described above) and large operating bandwidth cannot be achieved by other means, or where a directional antenna is needed, but construction and installation costs must be kept low.

In addition to its use as a simple and effective transmitting antenna (as described above), the rhombic can also be used as an HF receiving antenna with good gain and directivity. For example, BBC Monitoring's Crowsley Park receiving station has three rhombic antennas aligned for reception at azimuths of 37, 57 and 77 degrees.

== Advantages and disadvantages ==
The rhombics' low cost, simplicity, reliability, and ease of construction sometimes outweighs performance advantages offered by other more complex arrays.

Advantages

- Rhombics' input impedance & radiation pattern are relatively constant over a 2:1 range of frequencies. Their impedance can be made relatively constant over a frequency range 4:1 or more, with the forward gain increasing at 6 dB per octave.
- Multiple rhombic antennas can be connected in an end-to-end fashion to form MUSA (Multiple Unit Steerable Antenna). MUSA arrays can receive long distance, short wave, horizontally polarized downcoming waves.
- The rhombic remains one of the least complex medium-gain options for sustained long distance communications over point-to-point circuits.
- Rhombics also handle considerable transmitter power, since they have essentially uniform voltage and current distribution.

Disadvantages

- A rhombic requires a large area of land – especially if several antennas are installed to serve a variety of geographic regions at different distances or directions or to cover widely different frequencies.
- The rhombic suffers from efficiency problems due to earth losses below the antenna, significant power-wasting spurious lobes, termination losses, and the inability to maintain constant current along the length of the conductors. Typical radiation efficiency is in the order of 40–50%.
- The low efficiency significantly reduces gain for a given main lobe beamwidth when compared to other arrays of the same beamwidth.
