= Winter Harbor, Maine =

Town in Maine, United States

- Town
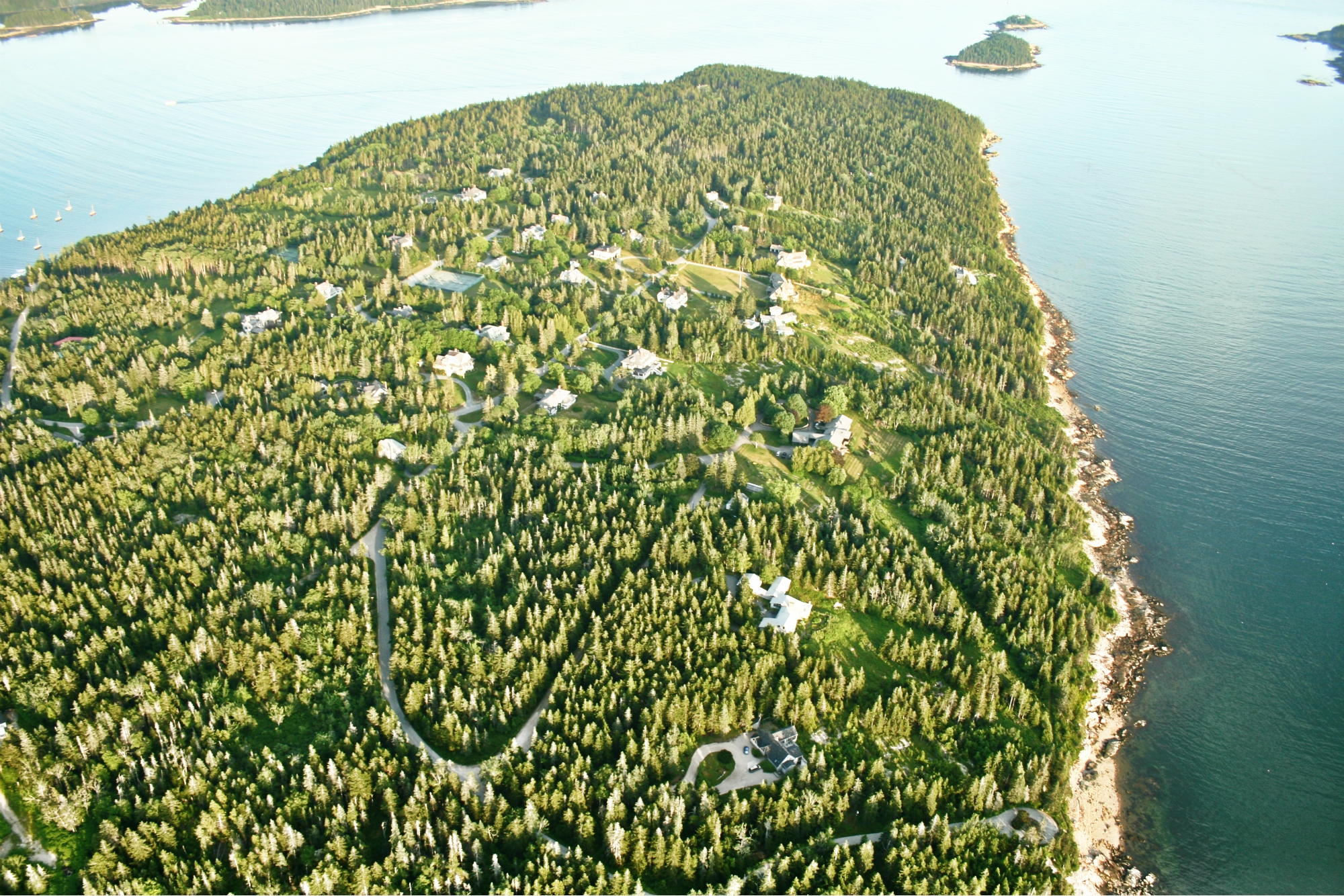
- Aerial view of Winter Harbor

- Seal

- Location within Maine Location within the United States
- Coordinates: 44°20′15″N 68°05′08″W
- Country: United States
- State: Maine
- County: Hancock
- Villages: Winter Harbor; Gerrishville; Summer Harbor; Grindstone Point (Summer Colony)

Area
  - Total: 69.12 sq mi (179.02 km^{2})
  - Land: 14.36 sq mi (37.19 km^{2})
  - Water: 54.76 sq mi (141.83 km^{2})
- Elevation: 0 ft (0 m)

Population (2020)
  - Total: 461
  - Density: 32/sq mi (12.4/km^{2})
- Time zone: UTC-5 (Eastern (EST))
  - Summer (DST): UTC-4 (EDT)
- ZIP code: 04693
- Area code: 207
- FIPS code: 23-86655
- GNIS feature ID: 582821
- Website: winterharborme.org

Winter Harbor is a town on the Schoodic Peninsula in Hancock County, Maine, United States. The population was 461 at the 2020 census. The town is located just outside the Schoodic Peninsula portion of Acadia National Park and is due east of the town of Bar Harbor and Ellsworth. Winter Harbor was once the location of a US Naval Station, NSGA-WH, which closed in the mid-2000s, and is now home to the Schoodic Institute’s Education and Research Center.

The Schoodic Point District of Acadia National Park is adjacent to the town, and has played an important role in the community’s economic and social development. The Municipality includes the village proper of Winter Harbor, the summer colony of Grindstone Neck, and the hamlets of Gerrishville and Summer Harbor. An iconic, Downeast fishing village, Winter Harbor is home to an active, multigenerational fishing fleet, and is the namesake of the Winter Harbor model boat. In addition, the community is or was a summer residence of several notable figures, such as Frederick Hauck, Fitzgerald Eugene Dixon, among others.

Winter Harbor hosts the annual Winter Harbor Lobster Festival each August, which celebrates the community’s history, culture, and economic activity. The festival draws crowds from across the Peninsula and wider Downeast Acadia Region, and includes activities, markets, boat races, a parade, and other events.

== Geography ==
According to the United States Census Bureau, the town has a total area of 69.12 square miles (179.02 km^{2}), of which 14.36 square miles (37.19 km^{2}) is land and 54.76 square miles (141.83 km^{2}) is water.

== History ==
Winter Harbor was raided various times by French and natives during Queen Anne's War. A United States Navy radio communications station operated here during World War II.

== Demographics ==
Historical population
Census	Pop.	Note	%±
1900	571		—
1910	590		3.3%
1920	503		−14.7%
1930	517		2.8%
1940	518		0.2%
1950	568		9.7%
1960	756		33.1%
1970	1,028		36.0%
1980	1,120		8.9%
1990	1,157		3.3%
2000	988		−14.6%
2010	516		−47.8%
2020	461		−10.7%
U.S. Decennial Census

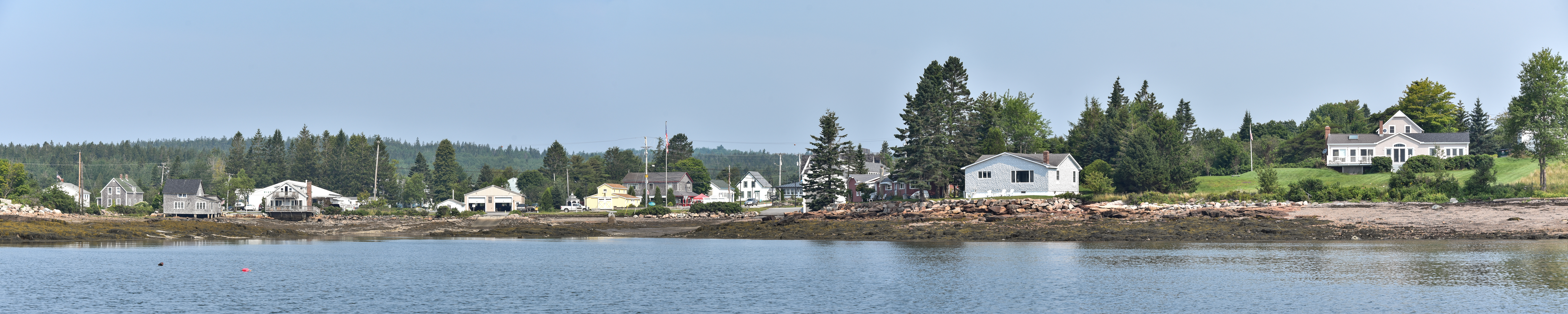
Town of Winter Harbor, Maine

=== 2010 census ===
As of the census of 2010, there were 516 people, 255 households, and 145 families residing in the town. The population density was 35.9 inhabitants per square mile (13.9/km^{2}). There were 519 housing units at an average density of 36.1 per square mile (13.9/km^{2}). The racial makeup of the town was 96.9% White, 0.4% African American, 0.2% Native American, 0.6% Asian, 1.4% from other races, and 0.6% from two or more races. Hispanic or Latino of any race were 1.7% of the population.

There were 255 households, of which 21.2% had children under the age of 18 living with them, 45.1% were married couples living together, 6.3% had a female householder with no husband present, 5.5% had a male householder with no wife present, and 43.1% were non-families. 36.5% of all households were made up of individuals, and 18.4% had someone living alone who was 65 years of age or older. The average household size was 2.02 and the average family size was 2.59.

The median age in the town was 51.1 years. 18% of residents were under the age of 18; 3% were between the ages of 18 and 24; 20% were from 25 to 44; 33.3% were from 45 to 64; and 25.8% were 65 years of age or older. The gender makeup of the town was 47.3% male and 52.7% female.

=== 2000 census ===
As of the census of 2000, there were 988 people, 402 households, and 278 families residing in the town. The population density was 68.8 inhabitants per square mile (26.6/km^{2}). There were 558 housing units at an average density of 38.8 per square mile (15.0/km^{2}). The racial makeup of the town was 89.98% White, 2.02% African American, 0.20% Native American, 0.71% Asian, and 7.09% from two or more races. Hispanic or Latino of any race were 3.64% of the population.

There were 402 households, out of which 38.8% had children under the age of 18 living with them, 57.2% were married couples living together, 8.0% households had a female with no husband present, and 30.8% were non-families. 25.6% of all households were made up of individuals, and 11.7% had someone living alone who was 65 years of age or older. The average household size was 2.46 and the average family size was 2.95.

In the town, the population was spread out, with 29.4% under the age of 18, 9.3% from 18 to 24, 30.8% from 25 to 44, 18.4% from 45 to 64, and 12.1% who were 65 years of age or older. The median age was 31 years. For every 100 females, there were 93.3 males. For every 100 females age 18 and over, there were 92.3 males.

The median income for a household in the town was $28,571, and the median income for a family was $32,750. Males had a median income of $24,063 versus $17,448 for females. The per capita income for the town was $15,438. About 5.5% of families and 11.0% of the population were below the poverty line, including 10.3% of those under age 18 and 6.1% of those age 65 or over.

== Grindstone Neck ==
The summer colony of Grindstone Neck lies on a peninsula southwest of the village. In 1889 a group formed “The Gouldsboro Land Improvement Company” with the idea of creating a summer colony much like that of Bar Harbor. Residents of this community share in an association which includes a yacht club, nine-hole golf course, tennis courts and footpaths.

The Winter Harbor Yacht Club purchased and renovated all nine original Winter Harbor 21 sailboats. Designed and launched in 1907, they are thought to be the oldest one-design sailboat fleet in the United States.

Many of the buildings on the neck were designed by Lindley Johnson, though the first few were designed by Wilson Eyre. The homes on Grindstone Neck are called "cottages", though many of them have upwards of 7–12 bedrooms.

== Education ==
The school district is Regional School Unit 24. The zoned elementary school is Peninsula School in Prospect Park. The district's secondary schools, Sumner Middle School and Sumner Memorial High School, are a part of the Sumner Learning Campus in Sullivan.

== Notable people ==
- Eleanor Widener Dixon (1891-1966), socialite and philanthropist
- Fitz Eugene Dixon Jr., educator, philanthropist
- Jacob Knowles, lobsterman and social media content creator
