= Esther E. Wood =

American journalist (1905–2002)

- Wood in 1994
- Born: Esther Elizabeth Wood; September 2, 1905; Blue Hill, Maine
- Died: December 1, 2002 (aged 97); Blue Hill, Maine
- Occupations: Professor of history and social sciences
- Years active: 1930–1973
- Known for: Historian of Blue Hill, Maine
- Notable work: Country Fare: Reminiscences and Recipes from a Maine Childhood (1976); Deep Roots: A Maine Legacy (1990)

Esther Elizabeth Wood (September 2, 1905 – December 1, 2002) was an American historian, educator, writer, and journalist. She taught history and social science at Gorham State Teachers College (now the University of Southern Maine) for 43 years. After her retirement, she wrote four books, a newspaper column, and numerous articles describing the history of Blue Hill, Maine, where her family had lived for generations, achieving local celebrity as the "town historian". She was inducted into the Maine Women's Hall of Fame in 1994.

== Early life and education ==
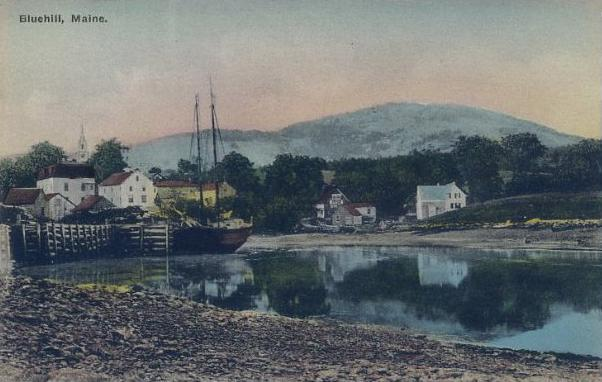
Blue Hill, Maine, c. 1920

Esther Elizabeth Wood was born in Blue Hill, Maine, to John Friend Wood and his wife, Lizzie Maddocks Wood. Her ancestors had settled in the eastern Maine towns of Blue Hill, Ellsworth, and Deer Isle before 1790. Her father managed quarries in Blue Hill and Deer Isle. She grew up in Friend's Corner, a rural neighborhood named after her paternal great-grandfather who had moved there in the 1820s. By 1900 the neighborhood was home to six families; growing up, Esther had four same-age cousins living close by.

Wood graduated from the George Stevens Academy in Blue Hill in 1922. She earned her A.B. degree from Colby College in 1926 and took a teaching job at the high school in Stonington, where her father was working as a stonecutter. In 1928 she entered Radcliffe College, earning her A.M. degree in 1929. She returned to Radcliffe in 1936 for another year of study.

== Career ==
=== Teaching ===
In 1929 she taught at Miss Hall's School in Pittsfield, Massachusetts, and in 1930 came to the Gorham Normal School to teach Maine and American history. She continued as a professor of history and social sciences at the school after its renaming to the Gorham State Teachers College in 1945 and the University of Southern Maine at Gorham in 1965. Both she and her classes were well-liked. She also spoke to local groups on historical topics. From 1934 to 1945 she held the post of Dean of Women.

=== Writing ===
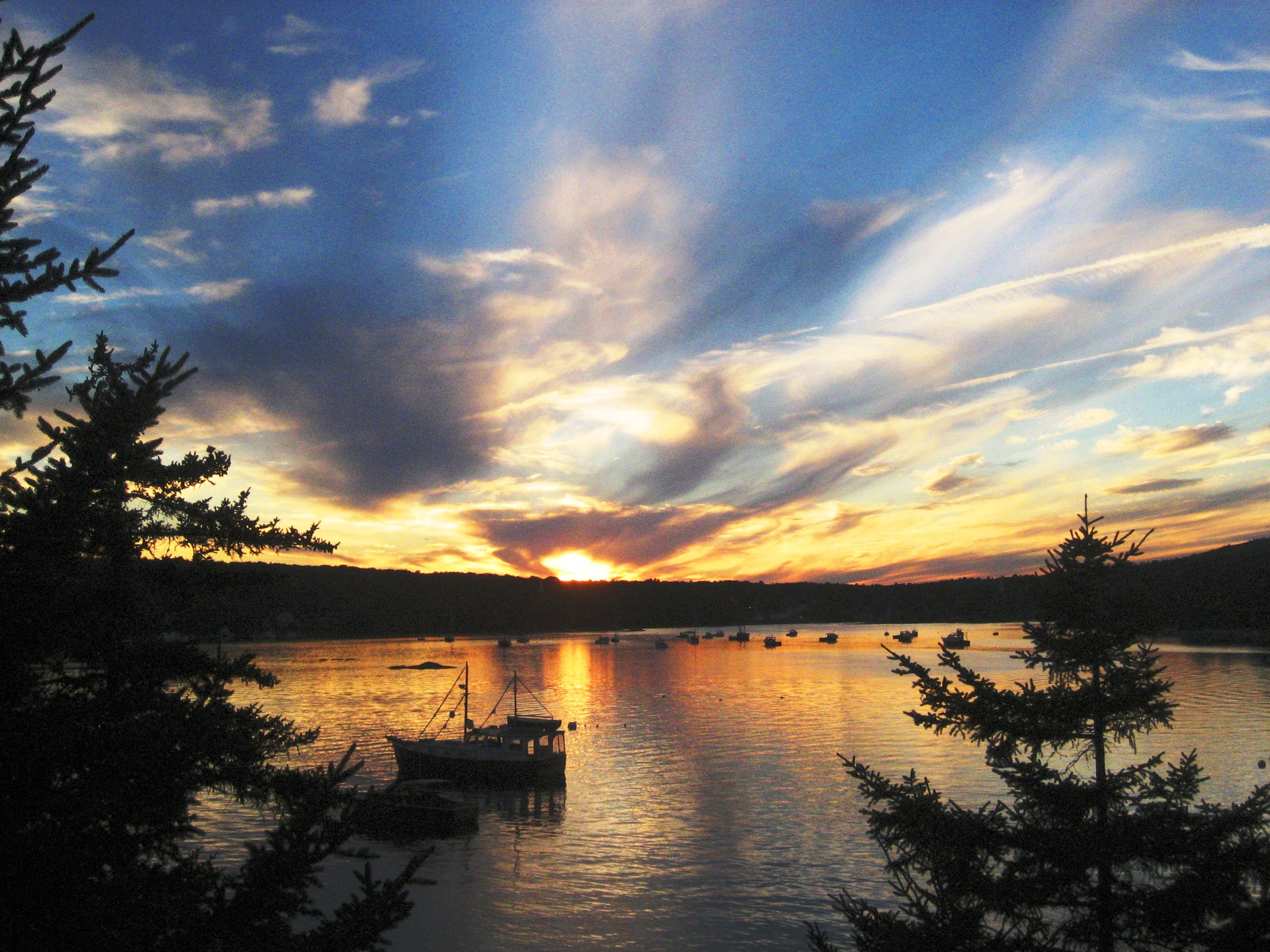
Blue Hill sunset, 2007

Wood retired in 1973 and returned to her Blue Hill farmhouse, where she lived the rest of her life. She had begun writing a column titled "The Native" for The Ellsworth American, recounting her memories of growing up in rural Maine, and continued producing this column for 24 years until 1992. She also wrote regularly for The Christian Science Monitor and Maine Life, and contributed stories to Sunday school publications and magazines. In addition, she penned four books dealing with the history and society of the Blue Hill region.

Continuing to speak for local groups and events, Wood became known as the "town historian", although she disliked the moniker. Her family lore formed the basis for her historical stories, as she had heard her father's and grandfather's personal recollections of living in Blue Hill in the 1800s. According to Hugh Curran, a University of Maine professor who videotaped Wood for an oral history project: "Her memory straddled 200 years... The uniqueness to me was her almost total recall. She could speak for an hour and not repeat herself. She had an incredible memory".

In 1977 she wrote a short history of her alma mater, the George Stevens Academy, for their student handbook, which has been printed in all subsequent editions.

Wood's historical notes are often mentioned in tour books of the Blue Hill region. She contributed the report on historical and archeological resources for the 1991 Blue Hill Comprehensive Plan, which was reprinted in the 2006 Blue Hill Comprehensive Plan.

Like her mother, who maintained a daily journal from 1893 to 1971, Wood wrote daily in her journal from 1973 to 2002.

== Other activities ==
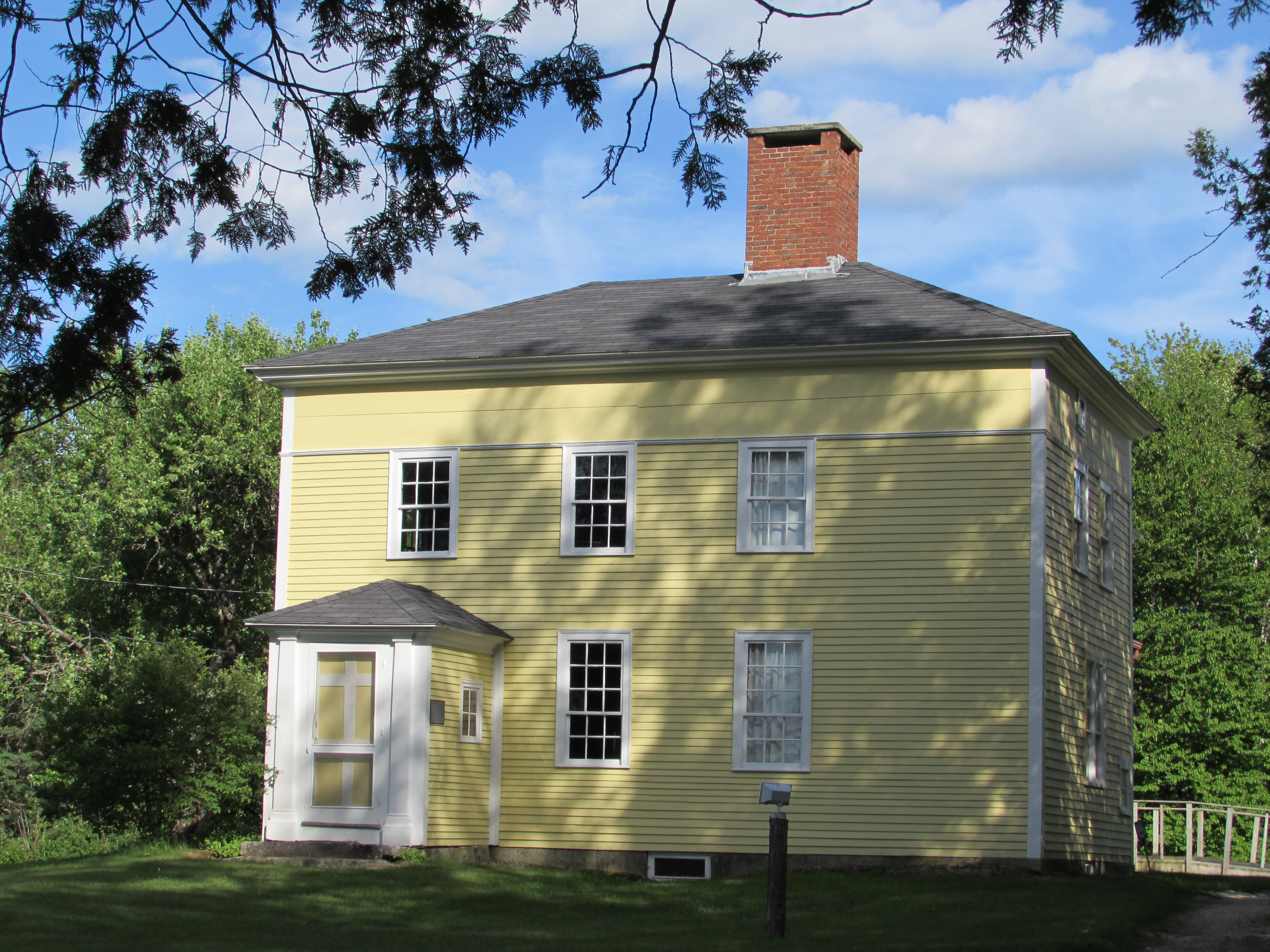
Jonathan Fisher House, Blue Hill, Maine

Wood was an active supporter of the George Stevens Academy, serving as a trustee and a member of the executive committee for a 1981 endowment campaign. She personally contributed to campaigns for a library expansion and the installation of tennis courts. She was also a member of the Blue Hill Historical Society, the Blue Hill Baptist Church, the Blue Hill Cemetery Association, the State Cemetery Association, the Blue Hill Garden Club, and the Jonathan Fisher Memorial, serving as secretary for the latter organization.

In 2000 she endowed a $100,000 scholarship at the University of Southern Maine at Lewiston-Auburn in memory of Edna Frances Dickey, her fellow history professor at Gorham State Teachers College.

== Awards and honors ==
In 1972, Colby College awarded her an honorary Doctor of Humane Letters. In 1973, the University of Southern Maine dedicated two new dormitory buildings in honor of history teachers Wood and Dickey. Resembling round towers, the Wood Tower and Dickey Tower each have eight floors.

Wood was named Woman of the Year by the Blue Hill Chamber of Commerce in 1985 and was the recipient of the Maine School Superintendents Association Award in 1987. She was inducted into the Maine Women's Hall of Fame in 1994.

== Death and legacy ==
Wood died on December 1, 2002, at her farmhouse and was buried in the Seaside Cemetery in Blue Hill. Her farmhouse was purchased by novelist Jonathan Lethem, who uses it as a summer home and writes in the same study that Wood did.

The Esther Wood Papers, containing her lecture notes on New England history from the 16th century through the American Revolutionary War and American Civil War, and 20th-century United States diplomacy, are housed at the University of Southern Maine. An oral history project which Hugh Curran conducted with Wood over a period of several years, comprising four 40-minute videotapes, is housed at the Blue Hill Public Library and the George Stevens Academy library.

== Bibliography ==
=== Books ===
- Country Fare: Reminiscences and Recipes from a Maine Childhood. New Hampshire Publishing Co. 1976. (containing family history and family recipes)
- Saltwater Seasons: Recollections of a Country Woman. Downeast Books. 1980. ISBN 9780892721085.
- Hannah: Reminiscences of an 1850 Childhood. Downeast Books. 1982. (about her aunt's youth) reprinted in 2014 as Hannah Wood of Blue Hill, Maine: Reminiscences of an 1850 Childhood
- Deep Roots: A Maine Legacy. Yankee Books. 1990. ISBN 0912769440. (published for the Blue Hill bicentennial)

=== Selected articles ===
- "A History of George Stevens Academy". George Stevens Academy.
- "'After School' was Exciting, Happy Time". Lewiston Evening Journal. 11 May 1963. p. 2-A.
- "Uncle Loved Oyster Stew Instead of Clam Chowder". Lewiston Evening Journal. 1 May 1965. p. 6-A.
- "Many Sacrifices Suffered by Colonial Maine People". Lewiston Evening Journal. 5 October 1957. p. 2-A.
- "To 'See' Maine's Best Scenery Travel the Rural Side Roads". Lewiston Evening Journal. 6 August 1955. p. 4-A.
