= St. Mark's Methodist Church =

St. Mark's Methodist Church or St. Mark Methodist Church may refer to:

- St. Mark Methodist Church (Atlanta, Georgia), listed on the NRHP in Fulton County, Georgia
- St. Mark's Methodist Church (Brookline, Massachusetts), listed on the NRHP in Massachusetts
- St. Mark's Methodist Church, New York City
