= George Albert Clough =

American architect (1843–1910)

George A. Clough
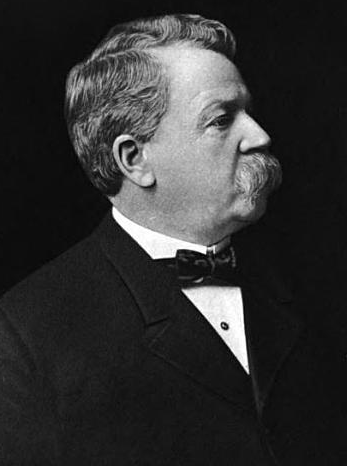
- George A. Clough, 1843-1910.
- Born: George Albert Clough; May 27, 1843; Blue Hill, Maine
- Died: December 30, 1910 (aged 67); Brookline, Massachusetts
- Occupation: Architect
- Buildings: Suffolk County Courthouse; Calf Pasture Pumping Station Complex

1st City Architect of Boston
- In office 1876–1883
- Preceded by: Office established
- Succeeded by: Charles J. Bateman

George Albert Clough (May 27, 1843 – December 30, 1910) was an architect working in Boston in the late 19th century. He designed the Suffolk County Courthouse in Pemberton Square, and numerous other buildings in the city and around New England. Clough served as the first City Architect of Boston from 1876 to 1883.

== Life and career ==
George Albert Clough was born May 27, 1843, in Blue Hill, Maine. He attended the Blue Hill Academy and worked as a draftsman for his father, the shipbuilder Asa Clough. He moved to Boston in 1863, entering the firm of Snell & Gregerson as a student. He remained with Snell until 1869, when he established his own practice. In 1876 he was elected City Architect of Boston, the first person to hold the office. (Note: The office of City Architect was established December 20, 1875. Clough was nominated January 31, 1876, and was unanimously elected to the office by a vote of the City Council on February 10, 1876.) He continued in that position until 1883, when he was replaced by Charles J. Bateman. He was awarded his largest commission, the Suffolk County Courthouse, in competition two years later in 1885. This building was completed in 1893, largely to Clough's design but with modifications he disapproved of. He was a private practitioner until 1901, when he formed a partnership with Herbert L. Wardner. Clough & Wardner operated until Clough's death in 1910.

Wardner continued to practice on his own in Boston until 1915, when he moved to Poughkeepsie, New York, moving again to Akron, Ohio, in 1919, where he died in 1939.

== Personal life ==
In 1876 Clough married Amelia M. Hinckley of Thetford, Vermont, the sister of Lyman G. Hinckley. They had three children.

Clough died December 30, 1910, at home in Brookline, Massachusetts, at the age of 67.

== Legacy ==
Historian Walter Muir Whitehill described him as "a competent but not very inspired practitioner."

A number of Clough's projects have been listed on the United States National Register of Historic Places.

== Architectural works ==
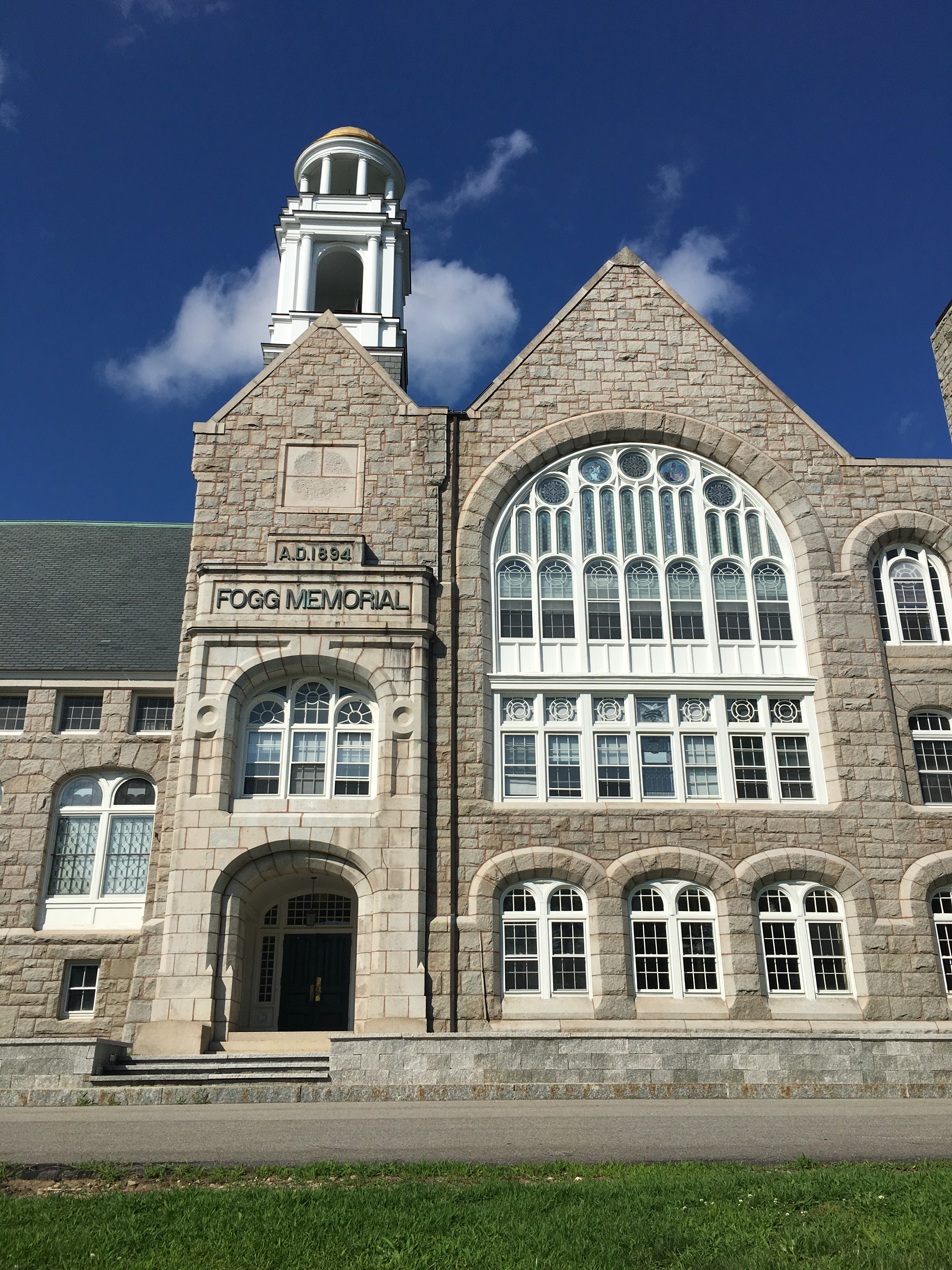
Fogg Memorial Building, Berwick Academy, South Berwick, Maine (1894)

- Gaston Grammar School, City Point, South Boston, 1873
- Fields Corner Municipal Building, Dorchester, Boston, 1874
- Framingham Reservoir No. 1 Dam and Gatehouse, E end of Framingham Reservoir No. 1, off Winter St. N of Long Ave. Framingham, Massachusetts, 1876
- Framingham Reservoir No. 3 Dam and Gatehouse, SE end of Framingham Reservoir No. 3, off MA 9/30 Framingham, Massachusetts, 1876
- English High and Latin School, Montgomery St., Boston, 1877
- Framingham Reservoir No. 2 Dam and Gatehouse, Between Framingham Reservoirs Nos. 1 and 2, W of jct. of Winter and Fountain Sts. Framingham, Massachusetts, 1877
- Marcella Street Home, Boston, 1880
- Prince School, corner Newbury St. and Exeter St., Boston, 1881
- Old State House (Boston, Massachusetts), restored by Clough 1881-1882
- Dillaway School, Boston, 1882
- Calf Pasture Pumping Station Complex, Dorchester, Boston, 1883
- Goddard Hall, Tufts University, Medford, Massachusetts, 1883
- Lyman School for Boys, Westborough, Massachusetts, c.1885, NRHP-listed
- Barncastle, 125 South St. (formerly 'Ideal Lodge') Blue Hill, Maine, 1884
- B.M.C. Durfee High School building, Fall River, Massachusetts, 1886
- Buck Memorial Library, Bucksport, Maine, 1887
- Bridge Academy, ME 127 and ME 197 Dresden, Maine, 1890
- St. Mark's Methodist Church, 90 Park St. Brookline, Massachusetts, 1892
- Curtis Hall, Tufts University, Medford, Massachusetts, 1893
- Suffolk County Courthouse, Pemberton Square, Boston, 1893
- New England Historic Genealogical Society building extension, Somerset St., Boston, 1894
- William Hayes Fogg Memorial Building, Berwick Academy, Maine, 1894
- Church of the Gate of Heaven, South Boston, c.1896
- Parker House, 185 South St. Blue Hill, Maine 1900 remodeling.
- Rockland Public Library, Rockland, Maine, 1903
- Vinalhaven Public Library, Carver St. Vinalhaven, Maine, 1906
- Bridgewater state workhouse
- Westboro insane asylum
- Northampton insane asylum
- Dana Hall, Wellesley, Mass
- Sudbury Aqueduct Linear District, along Sudbury Aqueduct from Farm Pond at Waverly St. to Chestnut Hill Reservoir

== Gallery ==
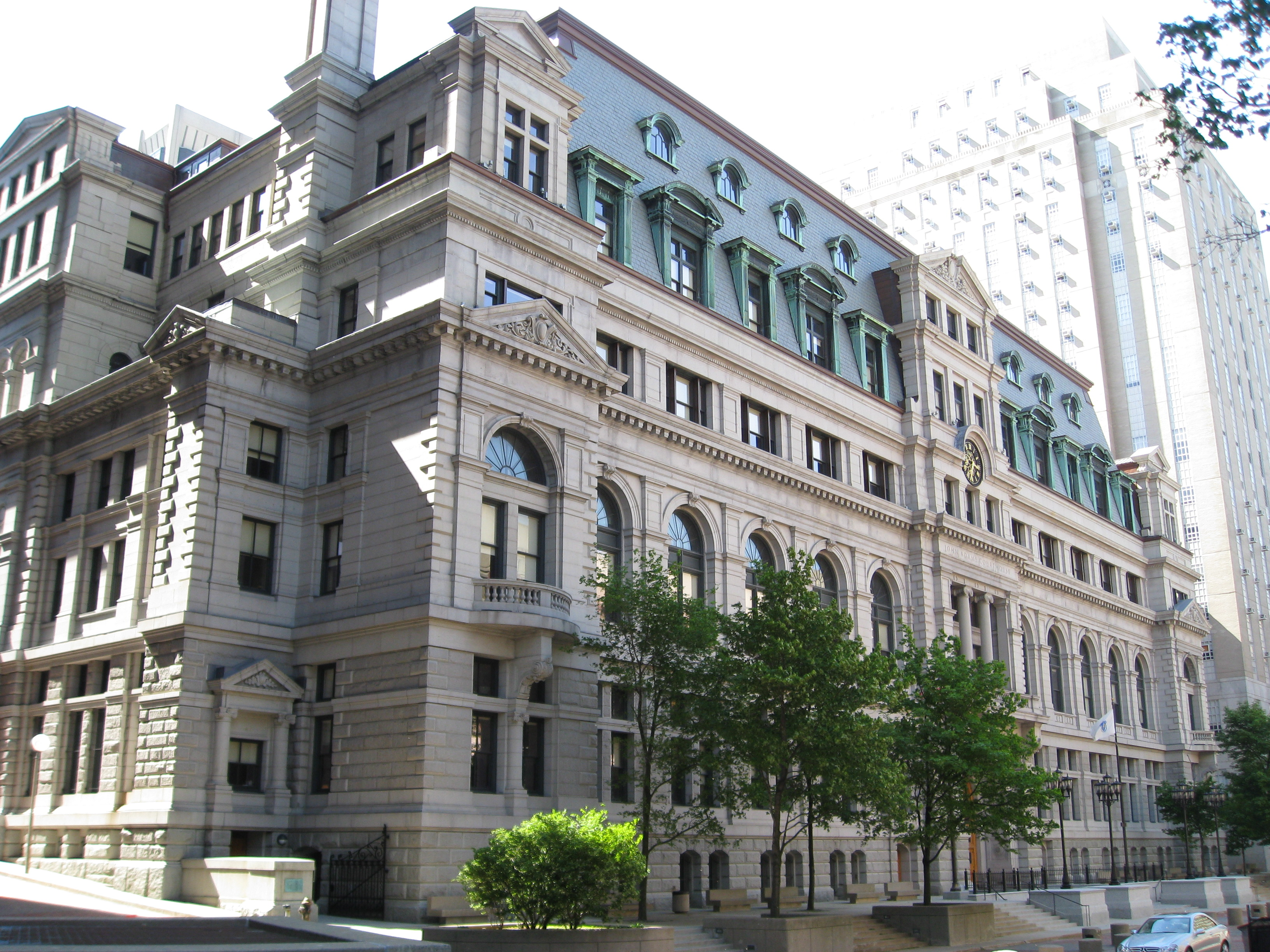
Suffolk County Courthouse, Pemberton Square, Boston

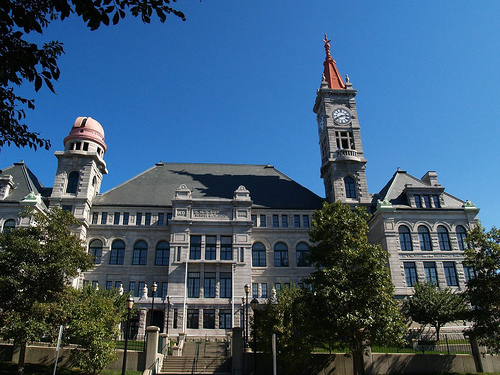
B.M.C. Durfee High School, Fall River, Massachusetts

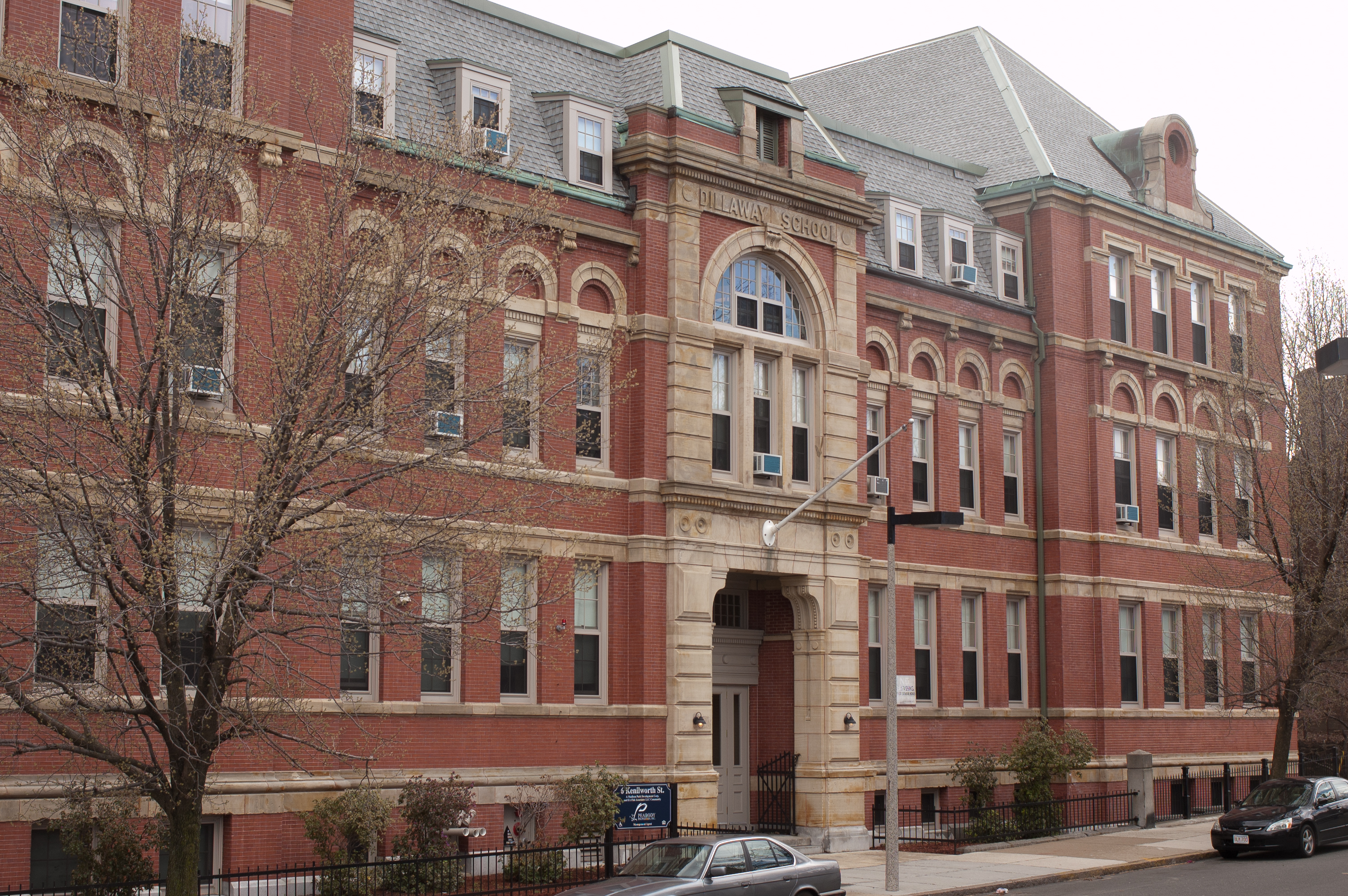
Dillaway School, Boston

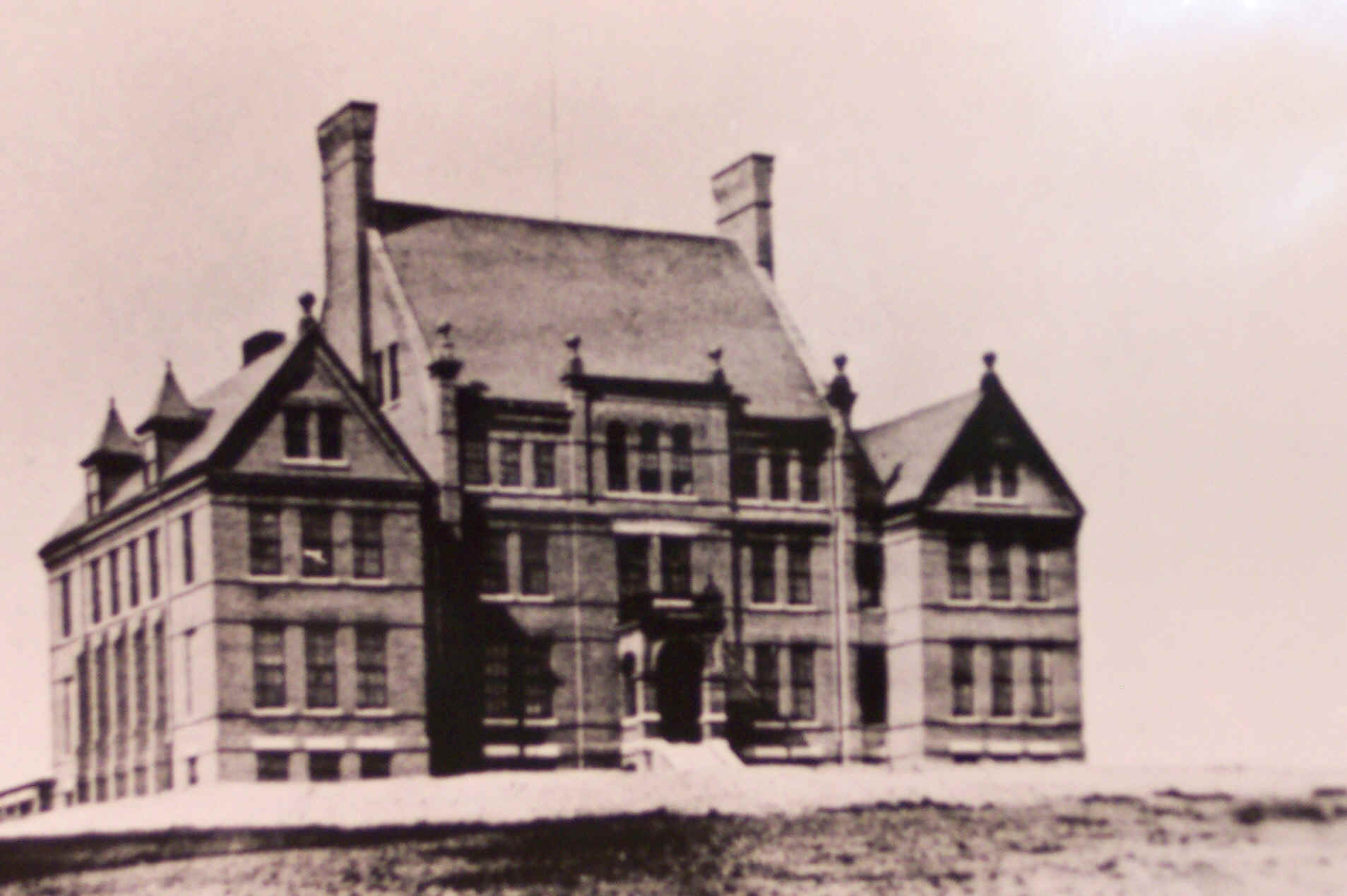
Lyman School for Boys, Westborough, Massachusetts

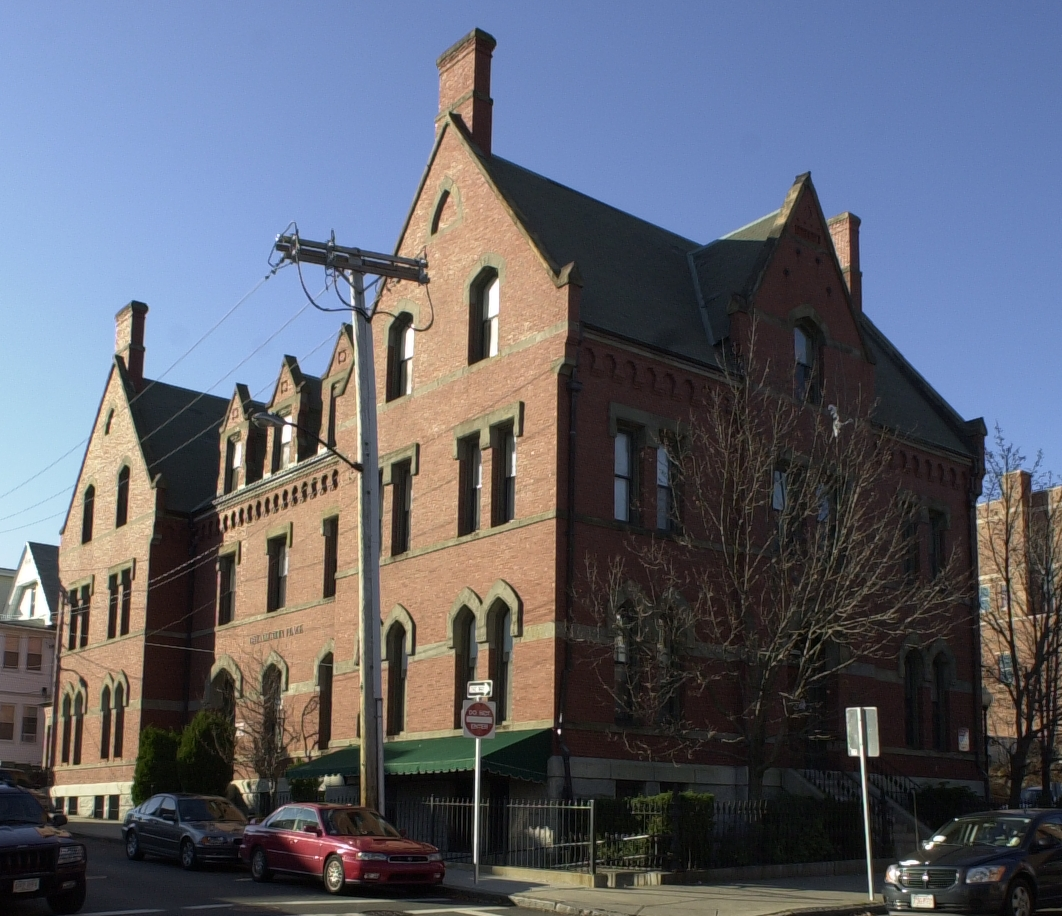
Fields Corner Municipal Building, Boston

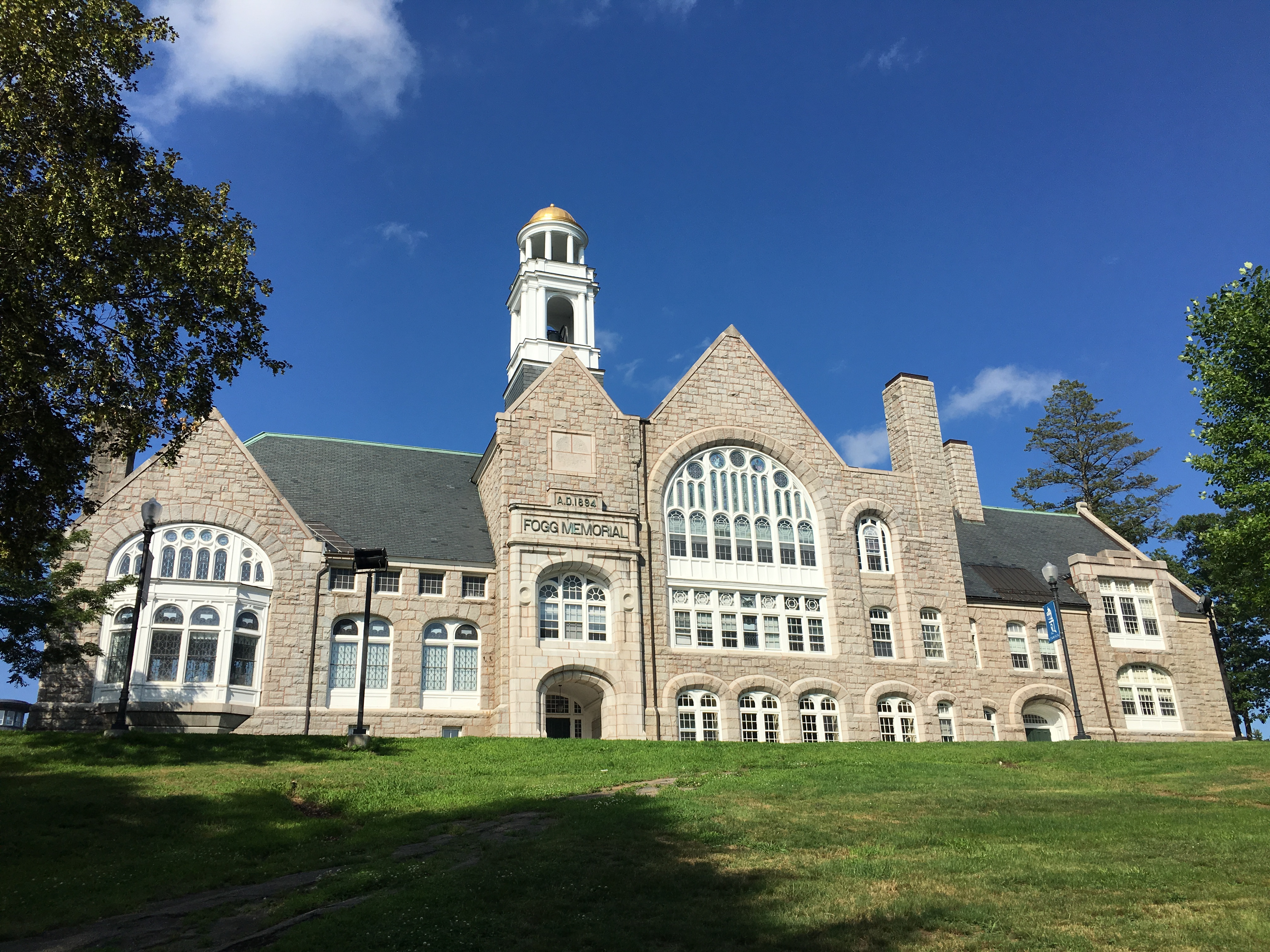
Fogg Memorial Building, Berwick Academy, South Berwick, Maine (1894)

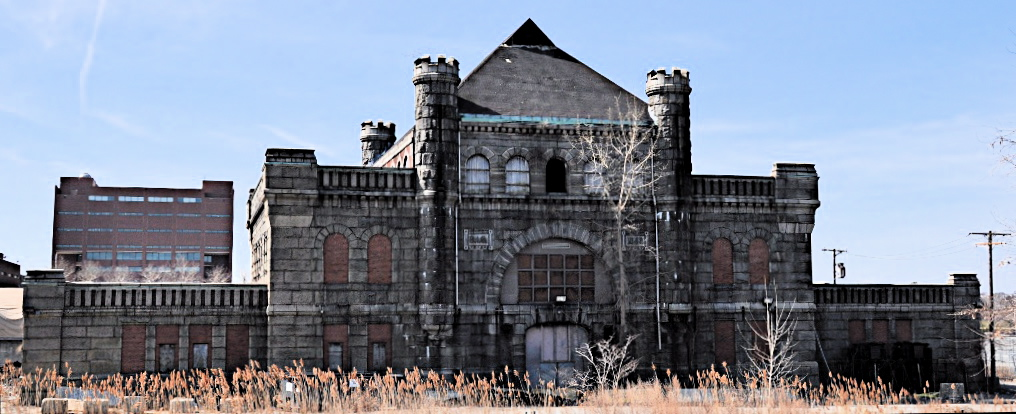
Calf Pasture Pumping Station Complex, Dorchester, Boston, in 2010

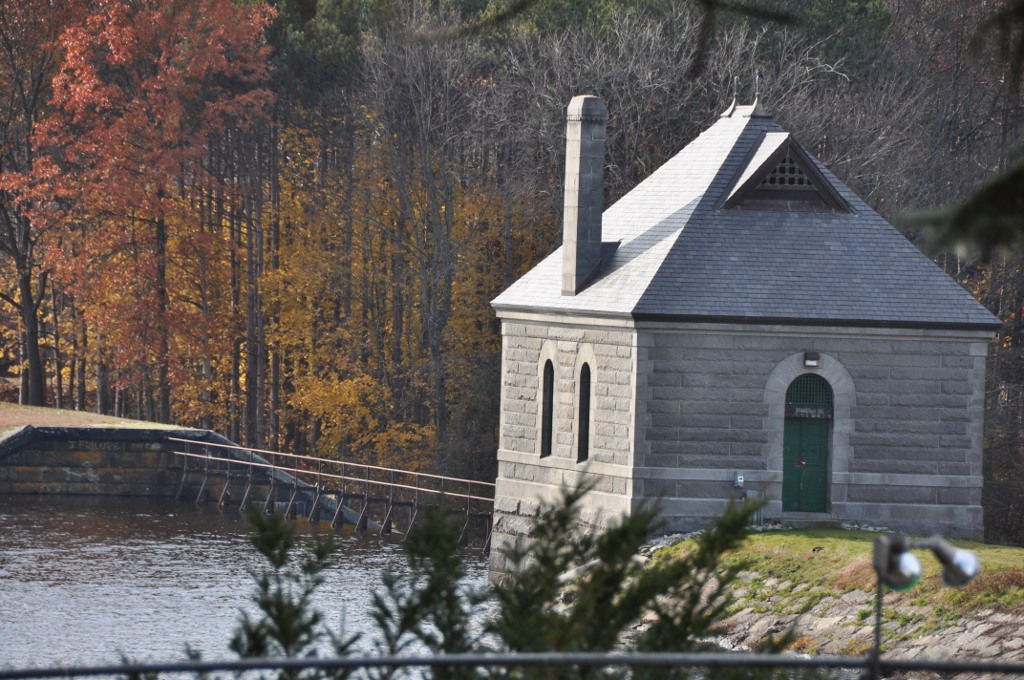
Framingham Reservoir No. 2 Dam and Gatehouse, Framingham, Massachusetts
