= The Nub =

Two coastal islands in Maine, US

Coordinates: 44°22′43″N 68°33′34″W

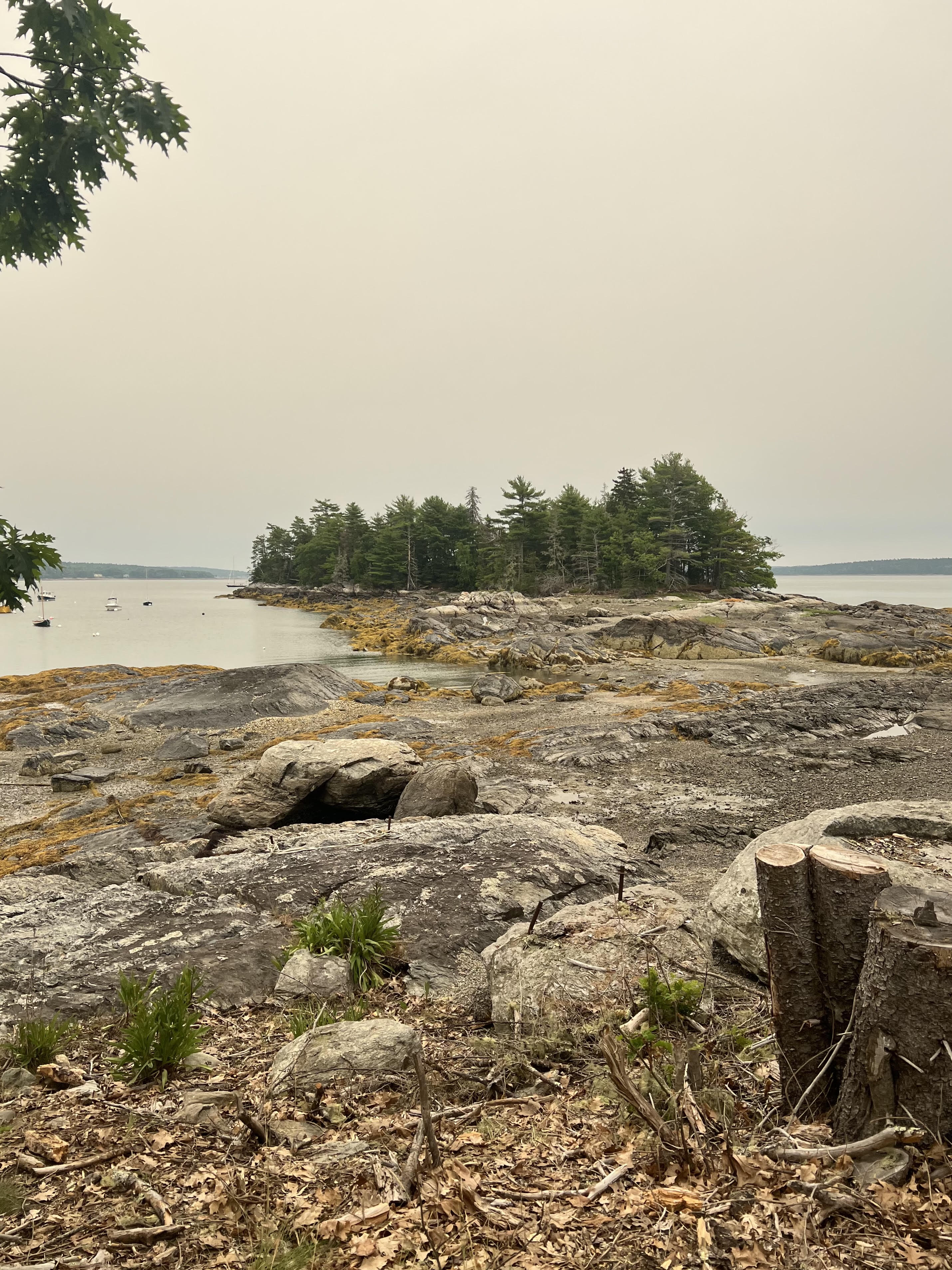
The Nub's larger island captured from the mainland at low tide. The foreground shows the exposed ridge.

The Nub is a series of two coastal tidal islands and an underwater ridge located in Blue Hill Falls, Blue Hill, Maine, United States.

The Nub was given to the town of Blue Hill in February of 2024. The donation created a conservation easement, allowing public access to a parking lot. Common activities in the area include fishing, boating, and tidepooling. During low tide, the ridge is exposed, and the larger island becomes accessible by foot. The smaller island is only accessible during very low tides.
