= Buck Memorial Library =

- U.S. National Register of Historic Places
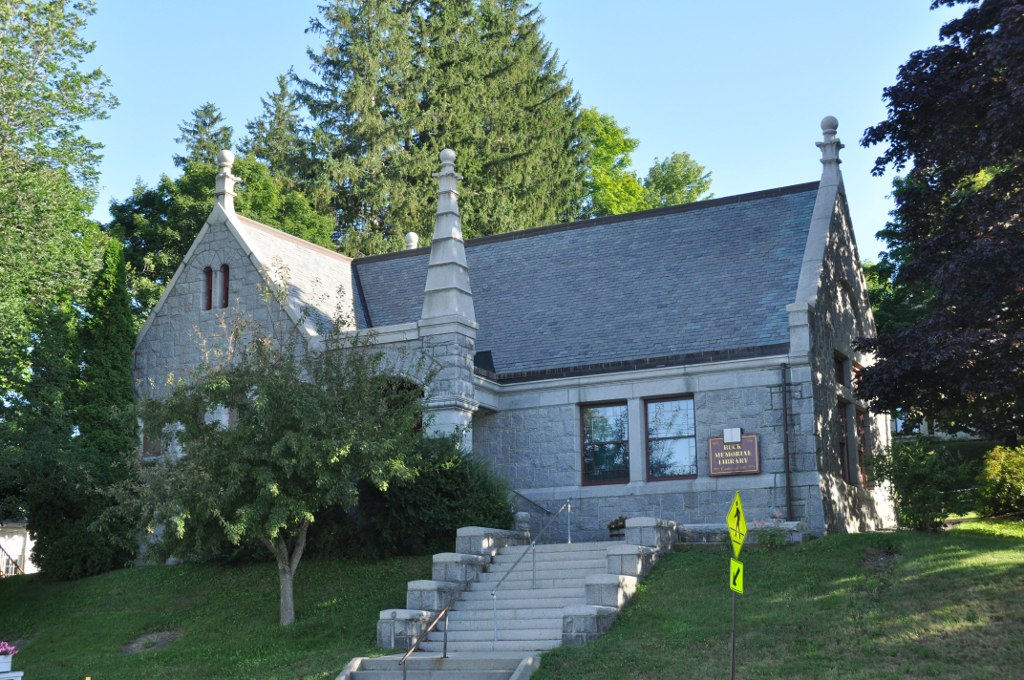

- Location within Maine Location within the United States
- Location: Maine St., Bucksport, Maine
- Coordinates: 44°34′17″N 68°47′32″W
- Area: less than one acre
- Built: 1887
- Architect: George A. Clough
- Architectural style: Gothic Revival, Romanesque
- NRHP reference No.: 87002193
- Added to NRHP: December 30, 1987

The Buck Memorial Library is the public library of Bucksport, Maine. It is located at 47 Maine Street in the center of the town, in an architecturally distinguished Gothic Revival stone structure designed by George A. Clough and built in 1887. The building was a gift from the family of Richard Buck, a descendant of Bucksport founder Jonathan Buck, and was listed on the National Register of Historic Places in 1987.

== Architecture and history ==
The library association in Bucksport was founded in 1806, and operated for many years as a private subscription service, operated first out of private homes and later out of a small leased space just off Main Street. The need for larger and more permanent quarters in the 1880s prompted the drive that resulted in the construction of the present facilities. Richard Pike Buck, the grandson of Bucksport founder Jonathan Buck, promised funding for construction of a building and an endowment, but died before the gift was made. His wife and daughter saw through the donation.

The building is a 1-1/2 story structure, fashioned out of rough-cut ashlar Blue Hill granite with dressed granite trim, and covered with a gabled slate roof. The building has an L-shaped plan, with a forward projecting gable end at the left, and the entrance located under a porch in the crook of the L. The interior, which has retained all of its original finishes and woodwork, and is laid out with the librarian's desk and office in the center, a reading room to the right, and the stack area to the left. The building is one of four small-town Maine libraries designed by Boston architect George A. Clough, who summered in his native Blue Hill.

== See also ==
- National Register of Historic Places listings in Hancock County, Maine
