= Jonathan Fisher House =

Historic house in Maine, United States

- Jonathan Fisher Memorial
- U.S. National Register of Historic Places
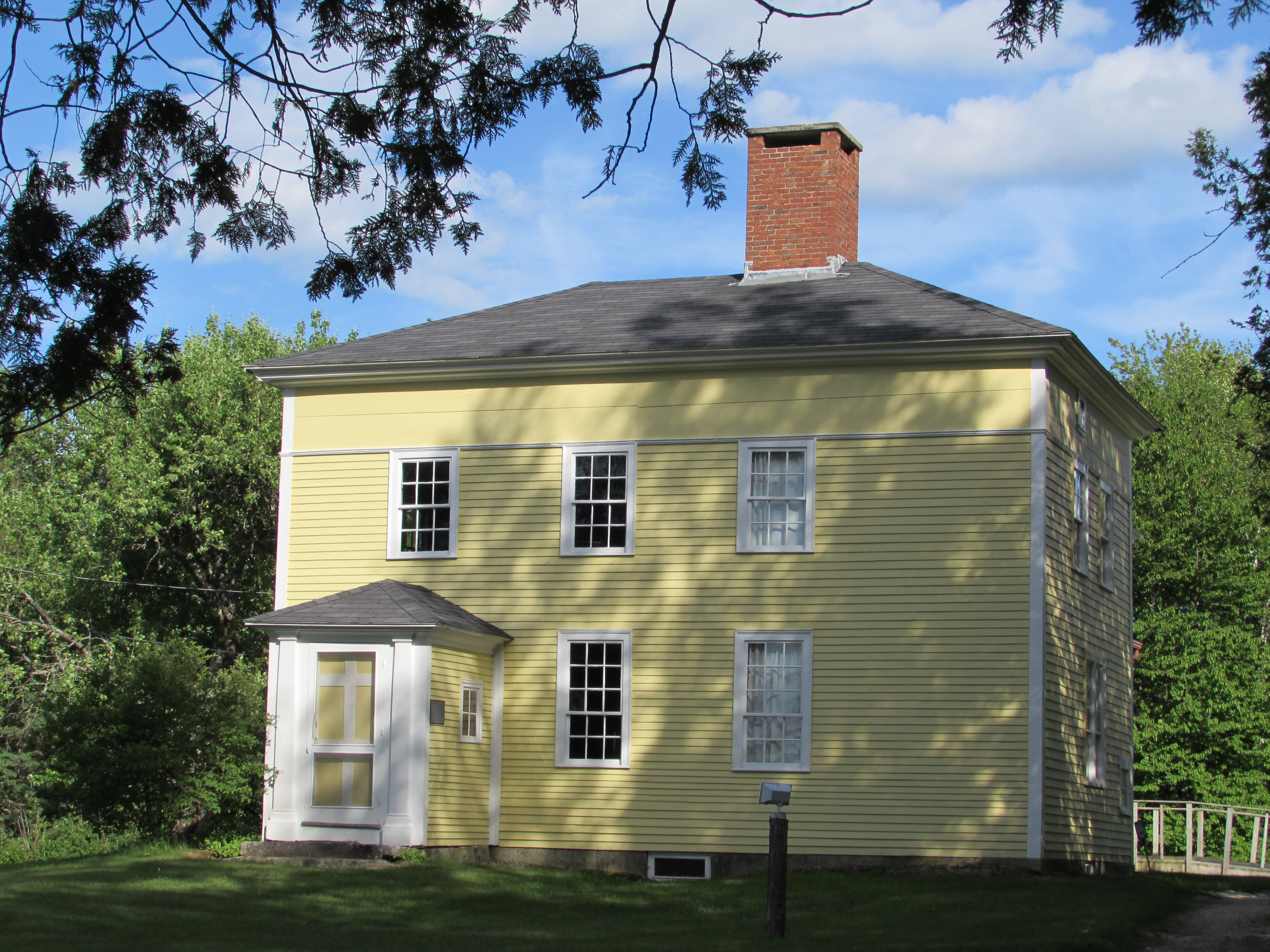

- Location within Maine Location within the United States
- Nearest city: Blue Hill, Maine
- Coordinates: 44.40539°N 68.60004°W
- Area: 2.3 acres (0.93 ha)
- Built: 1796
- NRHP reference No.: 69000031
- Added to NRHP: December 30, 1969

The Jonathan Fisher House is a historic house museum at 44 Mines Road in Blue Hill, Maine. The house was built in 1814 by Reverend Jonathan Fisher, the first settled minister of Blue Hill, and is now a museum dedicated to his legacy. Fisher (1768–1847) kept a journal of his life in rural Maine, and published other works, including Scriptural Animals, a work illustrated with woodcuts he created. The property was listed on the National Register of Historic Places in 1969 (as Jonathan Fisher Memorial); it is open seasonally between July and October.

== Description and history ==
Jonathan Fisher was born in New Braintree, Massachusetts, and educated at Harvard College, before moving to Blue Hill in 1796 to take up a new ministry. At that time he began construction of a small two-room house, which he reported moving into in 1797, still unfinished. In 1814 he built the current house, to which the older house was joined as an ell. The older house was demolished in 1896 by Fisher's grandchildren, who replaced it with a two-story addition. After the property was taken over by Jonathan Fisher Memorial, Inc. in the 1950s, a second addition was added to accommodate office and exhibition space. The property's outbuildings all decayed and were demolished over time; the last to go was the 1790s barn, which was taken down in the 1990s.

The Fisher House is set on the southeast side of Mines Road (Maine State Route 176), facing northwest on a largely level lot. The main house is a two-story wood-frame structure, with a hip roof, large central chimney, clapboard siding, and granite foundation. The main facade is three bays wide, which are evenly spaced but set off to the left. A plain entablature encircles the house below the roof, and the main entry, located in the lower left bay, is sheltered by an enclosed hip-roofed vestibule. The interior follows a central-chimney plan, with two rooms on the first floor and two on the second, set on either side of the chimney. The building has retained interior finishes, as well as Fisher family possessions.

== See also ==
- National Register of Historic Places listings in Hancock County, Maine
