= Surry, Maine =

Town in Maine, United States

- Town
- Seal

- Location within Maine Location within the United States
- Coordinates: 44°28′40″N 68°32′48″W
- Country: United States
- State: Maine
- County: Hancock
- Villages: Surry; East Surry; Rich's Corner; South Surry; West Surry

Area
  - Total: 51.13 sq mi (132.43 km^{2})
  - Land: 36.97 sq mi (95.75 km^{2})
  - Water: 14.16 sq mi (36.67 km^{2})
- Elevation: 243 ft (74 m)

Population (2020)
  - Total: 1,632
  - Density: 44/sq mi (17/km^{2})
- Time zone: UTC-5 (Eastern (EST))
  - Summer (DST): UTC-4 (EDT)
- ZIP Codes: 04684 (Surry); 04629 (East Blue Hill)
- Area code: 207
- FIPS code: 23-75280
- GNIS feature identity number: 582756
- Website: townofsurrymaine.com

Surry is a town in Hancock County, Maine, United States. The population was 1,632 at the 2020 census.

== Geography ==
According to the United States Census Bureau, the town has a total area of 51.13 square miles (132.43 km^{2}), of which 36.97 square miles (95.75 km^{2}) is land and 14.16 square miles (36.67 km^{2}) is water.

=== Climate ===
This climatic region is typified by large seasonal temperature differences, with warm to hot (and often humid) summers and cold (sometimes severely cold) winters. According to the Köppen Climate Classification system, Surry has a humid continental climate, abbreviated "Dfb" on climate maps.

Climate data for Surry, Maine (1991–2020 normals, extremes 2011–present)
Month	Jan	Feb	Mar	Apr	May	Jun	Jul	Aug	Sep	Oct	Nov	Dec	Year
Record high °F (°C)	53 (12)	58 (14)	82 (28)	79 (26)	90 (32)	97 (36)	95 (35)	92 (33)	89 (32)	83 (28)	72 (22)	59 (15)	97 (36)
Mean maximum °F (°C)	50.1 (10.1)	47.4 (8.6)	56.4 (13.6)	69.9 (21.1)	82.1 (27.8)	85.6 (29.8)	89.2 (31.8)	85.3 (29.6)	81.6 (27.6)	73.2 (22.9)	62.3 (16.8)	53.4 (11.9)	90.5 (32.5)
Mean daily maximum °F (°C)	29.5 (−1.4)	32.3 (0.2)	40.2 (4.6)	51.5 (10.8)	63.0 (17.2)	71.1 (21.7)	77.4 (25.2)	77.0 (25.0)	69.3 (20.7)	57.3 (14.1)	46.1 (7.8)	35.5 (1.9)	54.2 (12.3)
Daily mean °F (°C)	20.1 (−6.6)	22.2 (−5.4)	31.0 (−0.6)	41.7 (5.4)	52.5 (11.4)	61.2 (16.2)	67.4 (19.7)	66.7 (19.3)	59.3 (15.2)	47.7 (8.7)	37.4 (3.0)	27.3 (−2.6)	44.5 (7.0)
Mean daily minimum °F (°C)	10.6 (−11.9)	12.0 (−11.1)	21.8 (−5.7)	31.8 (−0.1)	41.9 (5.5)	51.3 (10.7)	57.4 (14.1)	56.4 (13.6)	49.2 (9.6)	38.1 (3.4)	28.8 (−1.8)	19.0 (−7.2)	34.9 (1.6)
Mean minimum °F (°C)	−7.0 (−21.7)	−6.9 (−21.6)	2.2 (−16.6)	20.2 (−6.6)	30.1 (−1.1)	39.7 (4.3)	49.0 (9.4)	47.2 (8.4)	35.0 (1.7)	26.3 (−3.2)	12.3 (−10.9)	−0.3 (−17.9)	−10.9 (−23.8)
Record low °F (°C)	−16 (−27)	−17 (−27)	−6 (−21)	14 (−10)	26 (−3)	30 (−1)	44 (7)	40 (4)	30 (−1)	20 (−7)	5 (−15)	−13 (−25)	−17 (−27)
Average precipitation inches (mm)	4.07 (103)	3.58 (91)	4.20 (107)	4.26 (108)	3.71 (94)	4.48 (114)	3.10 (79)	3.14 (80)	3.92 (100)	5.06 (129)	4.89 (124)	4.97 (126)	49.38 (1,254)
Average snowfall inches (cm)	17.5 (44)	27.2 (69)	16.2 (41)	4.2 (11)	0.1 (0.25)	0.0 (0.0)	0.0 (0.0)	0.0 (0.0)	0.0 (0.0)	0.3 (0.76)	6.1 (15)	15.3 (39)	86.9 (221)
Average precipitation days (≥ 0.01 in)	12.8	12.8	12.3	14.9	14.2	13.6	12.3	11.6	11.4	14.5	11.7	15.0	157.1
Average snowy days (≥ 0.1 in)	9.3	10.0	6.6	3.0	0.1	0.0	0.0	0.0	0.0	0.3	2.9	7.6	39.8
Source: NOAA

== Demographics ==
Historical population
Census	Pop.	Note	%±
1810	360		—
1820	428		18.9%
1830	561		31.1%
1840	857		52.8%
1850	1,189		38.7%
1860	1,319		10.9%
1870	1,242		−5.8%
1880	1,184		−4.7%
1890	986		−16.7%
1900	900		−8.7%
1910	734		−18.4%
1920	658		−10.4%
1930	488		−25.8%
1940	497		1.8%
1950	448		−9.9%
1960	547		22.1%
1970	623		13.9%
1980	894		43.5%
1990	1,004		12.3%
2000	1,361		35.6%
2010	1,466		7.7%
2020	1,632		11.3%
U.S. Decennial Census

=== 2010 census ===
As of the census of 2010, there were 1,466 people, 673 households, and 429 families residing in the town. The population density was 39.7 inhabitants per square mile (15.3/km^{2}). There were 1,119 housing units at an average density of 30.3 per square mile (11.7/km^{2}). The racial makeup of the town was 97.3% White, 0.2% African American, 0.5% Native American, 0.8% Asian, 0.1% from other races, and 1.1% from two or more races. Hispanic or Latino of any race were 0.7% of the population.

There were 673 households, of which 23.3% had children under the age of 18 living with them, 51.9% were married couples living together, 7.4% had a female householder with no husband present, 4.5% had a male householder with no wife present, and 36.3% were non-families. 28.8% of all households were made up of individuals, and 13.6% had someone living alone who was 65 years of age or older. The average household size was 2.18 and the average family size was 2.64.

The median age in the town was 49 years. 17.3% of residents were under the age of 18; 5.5% were between the ages of 18 and 24; 21.5% were from 25 to 44; 34.2% were from 45 to 64; and 21.4% were 65 years of age or older. The gender makeup of the town was 49.7% male and 50.3% female.

=== 2000 census ===
As of the census of 2000, there were 1,361 people, 551 households, and 404 families residing in the town. The population density was 36.5 inhabitants per square mile (14.1/km^{2}). There were 913 housing units at an average density of 24.5 per square mile (9.5/km^{2}). The racial makeup of the town was 96.84% White, 0.15% African American, 0.59% Native American, 0.37% Asian, 0.07% from other races, and 1.98% from two or more races. Hispanic or Latino of any race were 0.37% of the population.

There were 551 households, out of which 30.9% had children under the age of 18 living with them, 62.8% were married couples living together, 7.1% had a female householder with no husband present, and 26.5% were non-families. 21.8% of all households were made up of individuals, and 10.0% had someone living alone who was 65 years of age or older. The average household size was 2.47 and the average family size was 2.84.

In the town, the population was spread out, with 24.5% under the age of 18, 4.6% from 18 to 24, 26.3% from 25 to 44, 31.3% from 45 to 64, and 13.4% who were 65 years of age or older. The median age was 41 years. For every 100 females, there were 97.0 males. For every 100 females age 18 and over, there were 90.7 males.

The median income for a household in the town was $36,932, and the median income for a family was $41,324. Males had a median income of $30,871 versus $22,100 for females. The per capita income for the town was $19,199. About 11.4% of families and 14.6% of the population were below the poverty line, including 22.5% of those under age 18 and 9.5% of those age 65 or over.

== History ==
The following information derives from George J. Varney's A Gazetteer of the State of Maine, published in Boston, Massachusetts, in 1886:

Surry is situated on the west bank of Union River Bay, in Hancock County. On the north-east it is bounded by Ellsworth, on the south-west, by Blue Hill, on the west, by Orland and Penobscot. The town has an area of about 21,025 acres (85.09 km^{2}). Toddy Pond forms part of the boundary between Surry and Penobscot, and on the line between Surry and Ellsworth are the two Patten ponds whose outlet is Patten Stream. Fishways were constructed to these ponds in 1872, and the ponds have since been stocked with alewives and salmon. The surface of the town is considerably broken. The land generally is valuable for tillage. The majority of the surface soil is so intermingled with comminuted quartz, or siliceous sand, that cranberries grow in the grass fields. The cultivation of this crop is receiving increased attention. A large deposit of nearly pure silica in the town may prove of much value for glass and other ware. A few years ago, a bleak profusion of granite boulders lay over miles of surface on the Toddy Pond road. Today those boulders are seen in every stage of ruin. On every hand they are smitten with decay, and here and there a patch of unworn gravel is all that remains of a once great boulder. A few miles beyond these is a field of immense boulders, still uncrumbled, lying in wild confusion boulder on boulder.

The manufactories of Surry are a lumber, shingle, spool and two stave mills. Formerly there was a large business done in building small vessels, but it is now very much reduced. Surry has two mining companies: the Blue Hill Bay and the East Surry Company.

Surry was Township No. 6, in the grant to Marsh and others. It was first occupied by the French at Newbury Neck. The first English settlers were Symonds, Weymouth and James Flye. The next settlers were John Patten, a Mr. Hopkinson, Andrew Flood, Wilbrahim Swett, Matthew and James Ray, Samuel Joy, Isaac Lord, Hezekiah Coggins and Leonard Jarvis. Mr. Jarvis represented the eastern district in Congress from 1831 to 1837.

Up to 1820, about 13,000 acres (53 km^{2}) had been secured to settlers and by quiet possession titles, when Mr. Jarvis bought the remainder. In 1800, Surry included that portion of Ellsworth known as Ward 5; but in 1829 it was re-annexed to Ellsworth. There was a population of 289 as early as 1790. In 1874, a small quantity of silver coin was found at Weymouth Point. Surry furnished 135 men to the Union cause in the war of the Rebellion!

The Baptist, Free Baptist and Methodist denominations have churches in town. There are nine public schoolhouses, and the school property is valued at $3,400. The valuation of estates in 1870 was $207,137. In 1880 it was $177,534. The population in 1870 was 1,242. In 1880 it was 1,185."

=== Recent ===
The National Weather Service in Caribou established a cooperative weather station at East Surry in July 2007. The NWS station, named Ellsworth-3SSW, serves as an official meteorological recording site, providing daily weather and climate information to the (NWS) National Weather Service, (NCDC) National Climatic Data Center, CoCoRaHS (Community Collaborative Rain, Hail and Snow Network), and CWOP (Citizens Weather Observer Program). The station (Ellsworth-3SSW) continues the climate history of Ellsworth dating back to the 1930s. The cooperative station is located at an elevation of 105 feet, approximately two miles east of Surry village.

The NWS in Caribou renamed the station East Surry on July 1, 2011. This station begins a new climate history for East Surry, as it was found to be incompatible to the old ELLSWORTH POLL CONTROL station. The new data set begins on June 1, 2007, from the East Surry location.

== Education ==
It is in the Surry School District. Surry Elementary School is the local PreK-8 school.

Surry pays George Stevens Academy, a private school, to educate its students at the high school level.
