= Minerva Kline Brooks =

- Born: Minerva Cozens Kline; December 1, 1882; Cleveland, Ohio
- Died: May 5, 1929 (aged 45–46); Boston, Massachusetts
- Spouse: Charles S. Brooks (m. 1907; div. 1925)

Minerva Cozens Kline Brooks (December 1, 1882 – May 5, 1929) was a supporter of the women's suffrage movement in the United States and was active in the arts scene in Cleveland, helping to form the Cleveland Play House in 1915. She taught dance at the Noyes School of Rhythm in Cleveland.

== Life ==
Brooks née Kline was born in 1882 in Cleveland to Virgil P. Kline and Minerva E. Cozens Kline. She attended Hathaway Brown School and graduated from Vassar College in 1903. Her mother died during her early childhood, and her father married secondly Effie Hinckley Ober, a real estate investor and founder-manager of the Boston Ideal Opera Company. The summers of Brooks' youth were spent in Blue Hill, Maine, where her father and stepmother had founded a summer colony which attracted a number of prominent Clevelanders, including Walter Teagle of Standard Oil and family members & business associates of industrialist Mark Hanna.

On October 12, 1907, Minerva married writer Charles S. Brooks. In 1910 she joined of the Cleveland chapter of the College Equal Suffrage League. Brooks was also a member of the Cleveland Suffrage Association and the Cleveland Suffrage Party.

Brooks helped form the Cleveland Play House with a group of friends including Ernest and Katherine Angell, parents of the late Roger Angell. She appeared in their first production, a puppet show.

The Brookses moved to New York City in 1916. They returned to Cleveland where Minerva taught interpretive dance at the Cleveland branch of the Noyes School of Rhythm. The couple divorced in 1925.

Brooks died on May 5, 1929, in Boston. Her legacy includes The Music Settlement of Cleveland, a music school still active to which she left her house on Magnolia Drive.
