= Effie Hinckley Ober Kline =

American opera manager (1843–1927)

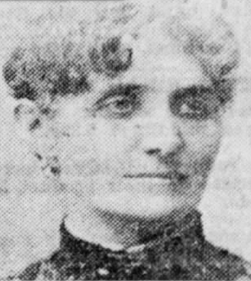
- Effie Hinckley Ober Kline, from a 1927 newspaper.
- Born: Effie Hinckley Ober; 1843; Sedgwick, Maine
- Died: February 15, 1927 (aged 83–84); Boston, Massachusetts
- Other names: E. H. Ober
- Known for: founder of the Boston Ideal Opera Company

Effie Hinckley Ober Kline (1843 – February 15, 1927) was an American opera manager and booking agent. She founded the Boston Ideal Opera Company (later known as "The Bostonians") in 1879.

== Early life ==
Effie Hinckley Ober was born in Sedgwick, Maine, and brought up in Blue Hill, the daughter of Samuel Ober and Mary Peters Hinckley Ober. Through her mother she was descended from Joseph Wood, co-founder of Blue Hill, and was herself a co-founder of Blue Hill's summer colony.

== Career ==
Ober was a secretary at a lecture bureau in Boston as a young woman. In time, she owned a theatrical agency, the Roberts Lyceum Bureau. She founded the Boston Ideal Opera Company (later known as "The Bostonians") in 1879, with Adelaide Phillipps and Myron W. Whitney among the cast members. Her company presented American operettas, popular operas such as The Bohemian Girl and The Marriage of Figaro, and the Gilbert and Sullivan favorite H.M.S. Pinafore.

Ober traveled with the company as its manager until she resigned in 1885. "For five years I have given my undivided attention to the affairs of the company, and I can assure you that the work is of the most wearing character," she explained. "I will retire from the field entirely satisfied with the result." Journalist Nellie Bly called Effie Ober "A Plucky Woman" in an 1885 profile. The company continued after her tenure. In 1887 she assisted her old company in resolving an internal dispute: "Miss Ober is here to give us her advice as to our course next season."

Kline later served on the Board of Managers of Cleveland's Lakeside Hospital, and chaired the board's library committee.

== Personal life ==
Effie H. Ober married Cleveland-based lawyer Virgil P. Kline, the father of suffragist Minerva Kline Brooks, in 1888. Her husband was personal attorney of John D. Rockefeller, and worked for Standard Oil Company for many years, before he died in 1917. She died in 1927, in Boston; her grave is with her husband's, in Cleveland.

Effie Ober Kline's scrapbooks are preserved at Parker House, a historical site in Blue Hill, Maine. Another of her homes in Maine is now known as Barncastle, and houses a restaurant and inn.
