= Bagaduce Music Lending Library =

Coordinates: 44°24′58.44″N 68°34′57.14″W

The Bagaduce Music Lending Library is a music lending library in Blue Hill, Maine.

== History ==
Established in 1983 in the garage of Mary Cheyney Gould and Marcia Chapman, the Library outgrew its original home on the Penobscot Bay near the Bagaduce River. We house over a million pieces of music with over 150,000 individual titles and over 47% of these are rare titles not found on any other library shelves. It is a huge resource for lending sheet music used by musicians, educators and music lovers in all 50 US states and 28 foreign countries. This nonprofit organization also provides music education programs including a Young Composer's Competition and Festival and many 4 year music memberships to the Library for 8th grade students. The Library also sponsors the Annual Blue Hill Pops Concert, which has featured musicians like Paul Sullivan, Noel Paul Stookey of Peter, Paul and Mary, buttermilk fiddler, Andy Stein, Don Campbell and many Maine composers and musicians.
