= Fields Corner Municipal Building =

- U.S. National Register of Historic Places
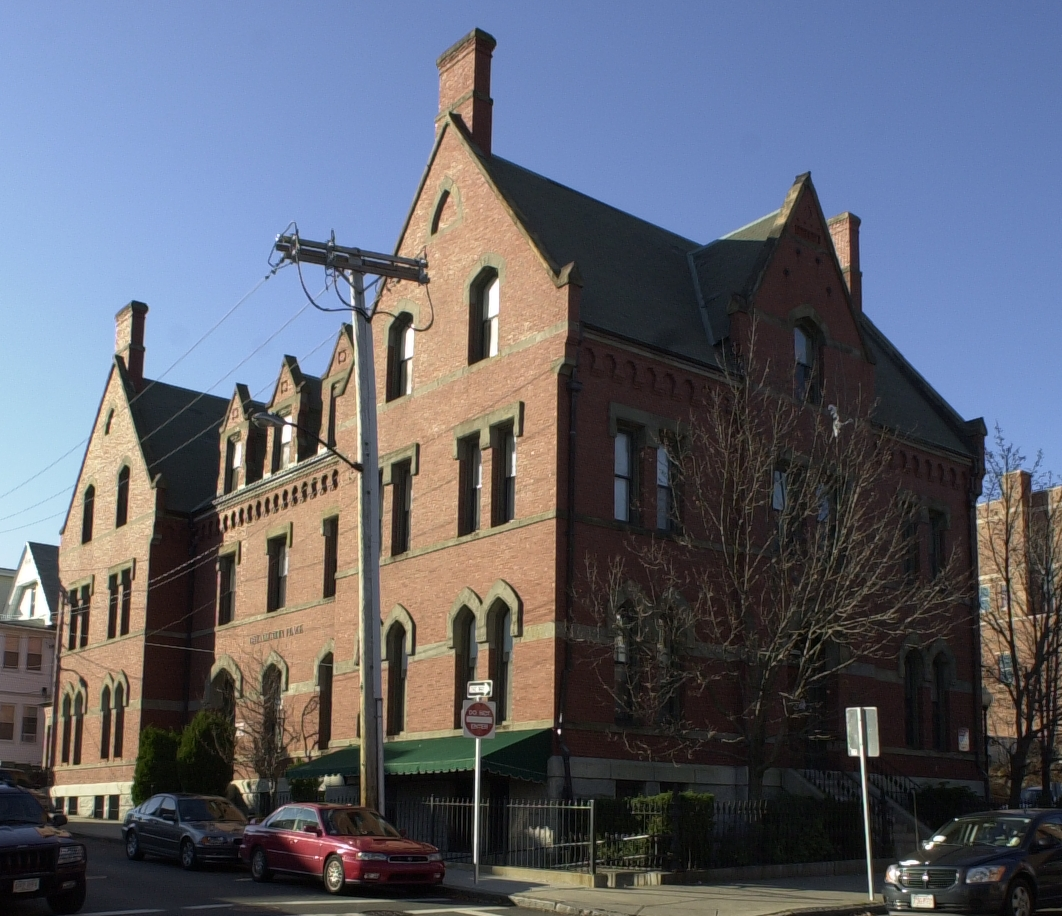

- Location within Massachusetts Location within the United States
- Location: 1 Arcadia St., 195 Adams St., Boston, Massachusetts
- Coordinates: 42°18′8″N 71°3′37.2″W
- Area: 0.1 acres (0.040 ha)
- Built: 1874
- Architect: George Albert Clough
- Architectural style: Gothic
- NRHP reference No.: 81000620
- Added to NRHP: November 12, 1981

The Fields Corner Municipal Building is a historic municipal building at 1 Arcadia Street and 195 Adams Street in the Dorchester neighborhood of Boston, Massachusetts. Built in 1875, it is a prominent local example of Victorian Gothic architecture, probably designed by the city's first official architect, George A. Clough. The building originally housed a police station and library; it has been adaptively reused for professional and commercial purposes. The building was listed on the National Register of Historic Places in 1981.

== Description and history ==
The former Fields Corner Municipal Building stands near the commercial center of Fields Corner. Its setting at the northwest corner of Adams and Arcadia Streets is just north of the angled intersection of Adams Street with Dorchester Avenue, which is the area's principal junction. The building is 2-1/2 stories tall and built out of red brick with limestone trim. It has an H-shaped layout and High Victorian Gothic styling. The front-facing end gables are parapeted, and there are three similarly styled gable dormers in the central section. Ground-floor windows are set in pointed openings with shouldered stone headers, while those on the second floor are set in rectangular openings.

The building was designed by George A. Clough and built sometime between 1874 and 1885. It was intended as a replacement for a police station located on Hancock Street, and the new police station occupied one wing, with jail cells in the basement. The other wing was first used to establish the city's first branch library. Later use by the city included a district court.

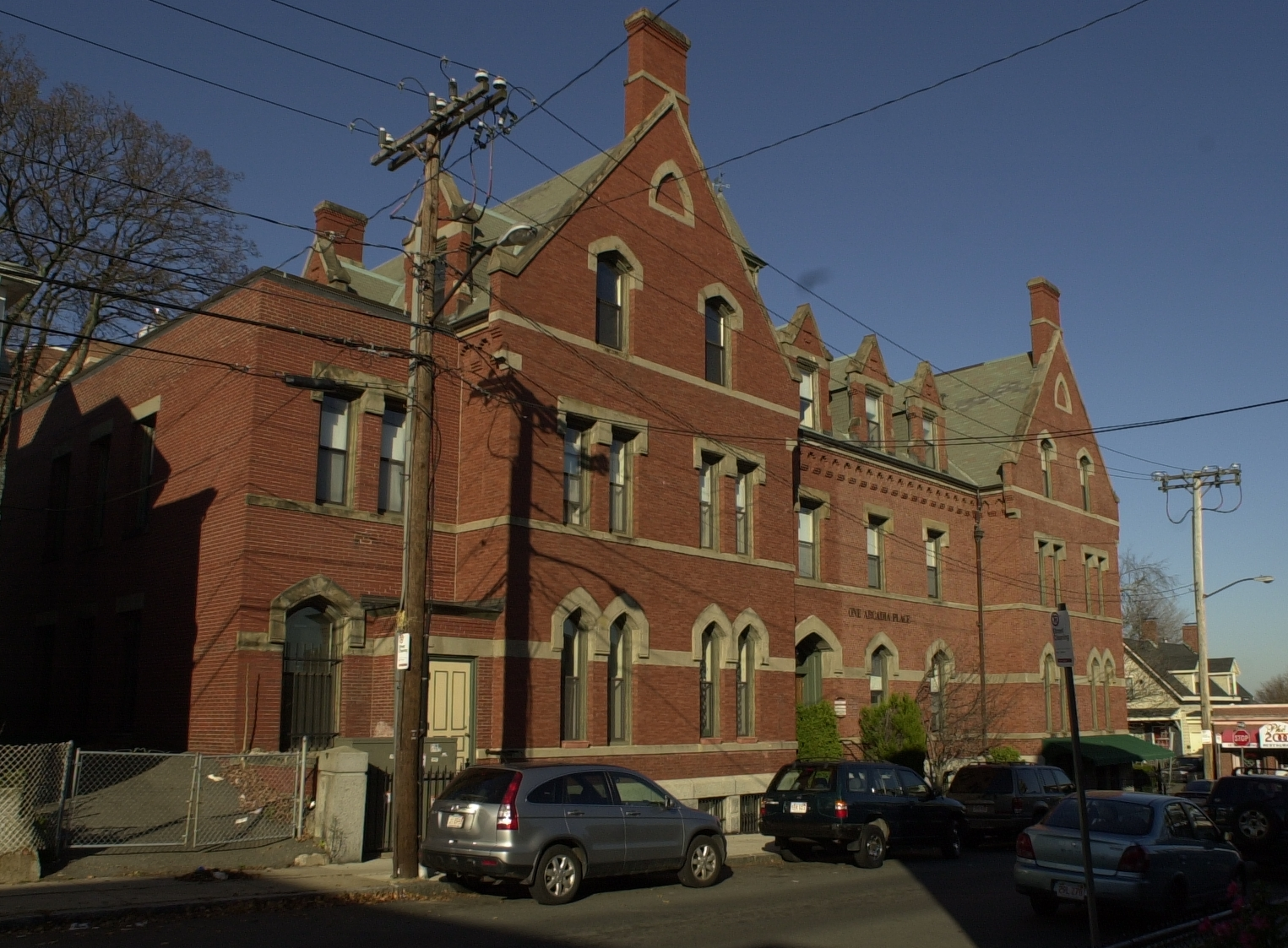

== See also ==
- National Register of Historic Places listings in southern Boston, Massachusetts
