= George Stevens Academy =

School in Blue Hill, Maine, United States

Coordinates: 44.4137°N 68.5902°W

George Stevens Academy, Blue Hill, Maine (1898)

George Stevens Academy (GSA) is a private school in Blue Hill, Maine.

The following towns in Hancock County pay GSA to educate their students at the high school level: Blue Hill, Brooklin, Brooksville, Castine, Penobscot, Sedgwick, and Surry. These towns do not operate public high schools but instead send their high school students to this school. The Bangor Daily News described the school as "semi-private", and as "the area high school".

As of 1981 private funds were used to construct all of the buildings. It is the oldest school in the county.

== History ==
The Blue Hill Academy incorporated in 1803 when Maine was still part of Massachusetts. It was among the earliest academies in the District of Maine and served students from Blue Hill and surrounding communities. Its original wooden school building was replaced by a brick building on the 1830s. The academy's curriculum included subjects such as Greek, Latin and navigation.

Blue Hill merchant George Stevens left much of his estate, including his homestead and land , in trust for the establishment of another academy. George Stevens Academy was incorporated by the Maine Legislature in 1891. The trustees began using the bequest for the school in 1897, and a new academy building was subsequently operated in jointly, with the two corporations sharing administration. Contemporary legislative records referred to the combined institution as Blue Hill-George Stevens Academy by 1899.

The two institutions were legally merged in 1943, combining their endowment funds under the name Blue Hill-George Stevens Academy. During the following decades, neighboring communities increasingly sent secondary-school students to the academy as local high schools were consolidated or closed. The institution returned to the name George Stevens Academy in 1968.

In 2002, the Maine Legislature amended the academy's governing structure, allowing its board of trustees to contain between nine and 21 members and removing a previous requirement that a majority of trustees reside in Blue Hill.

In 2025, the Town of Blue Hill agreed to purchase two properties from George Stevens Academy; the former dormitory property at 30 Tenney Hill and beneath and adjacent to Blue Hill Consolidated School. The aggregate purchase price was $1.875 million. Blue Hill voters approved the purchase at a special town meeting on August 24 by a vote of 227-73, and the transaction was subsequently completed.

In 2026, the academy began construction of a new main entrance and bus lane as part of a $2.1 million Gateway Project, financed through funds raised specifically for the project. The work occurred amid declining enrollment and reductions to the school's operating budget; the Bangor Daily News reported that enrollment had fallen by approximately 75 students since 2003, to about 200 students by late 2025.

== See also ==
- Education in Maine

Other private high schools in Maine which take students with public funds (from unorganized areas and/or with agreements with school districts):

- Foxcroft Academy
- Lee Academy
- Waynflete School
