= Calf Pasture Pumping Station Complex =

Sewage treatment facility in Boston

- U.S. National Register of Historic Places
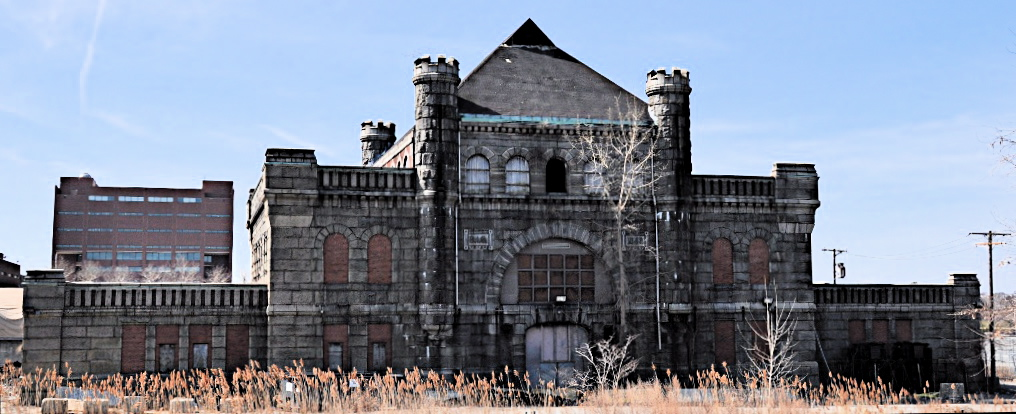

- Location within Massachusetts Location within the United States
- Location: Boston, Massachusetts
- Coordinates: 42°18′58″N 71°2′15.5″W
- Area: 9.5 acres (3.8 ha)
- Built: 1883
- Architect: Clough, George Albert
- Architectural style: Queen Anne, Romanesque
- NRHP reference No.: 90001095
- Added to NRHP: August 2, 1990

The Calf Pasture Pumping Station Complex is a historic sewage treatment facility at 435 Mount Vernon Street on Columbia Point in the Dorchester section of Boston, Massachusetts which was built in the 1880s.

The surrounding community was, in the 17th and 18th centuries, and through to the mid-19th century, a calf pasture: a place where nearby Dorchester residents took their calves for grazing. It was largely an uninhabited marshland on the Dorchester peninsula. Its size was originally 14 acres (5.7 ha). Many landfills, subsequent to that time, have enlarged the land size to 350 acres (140 ha) in the 20th century.

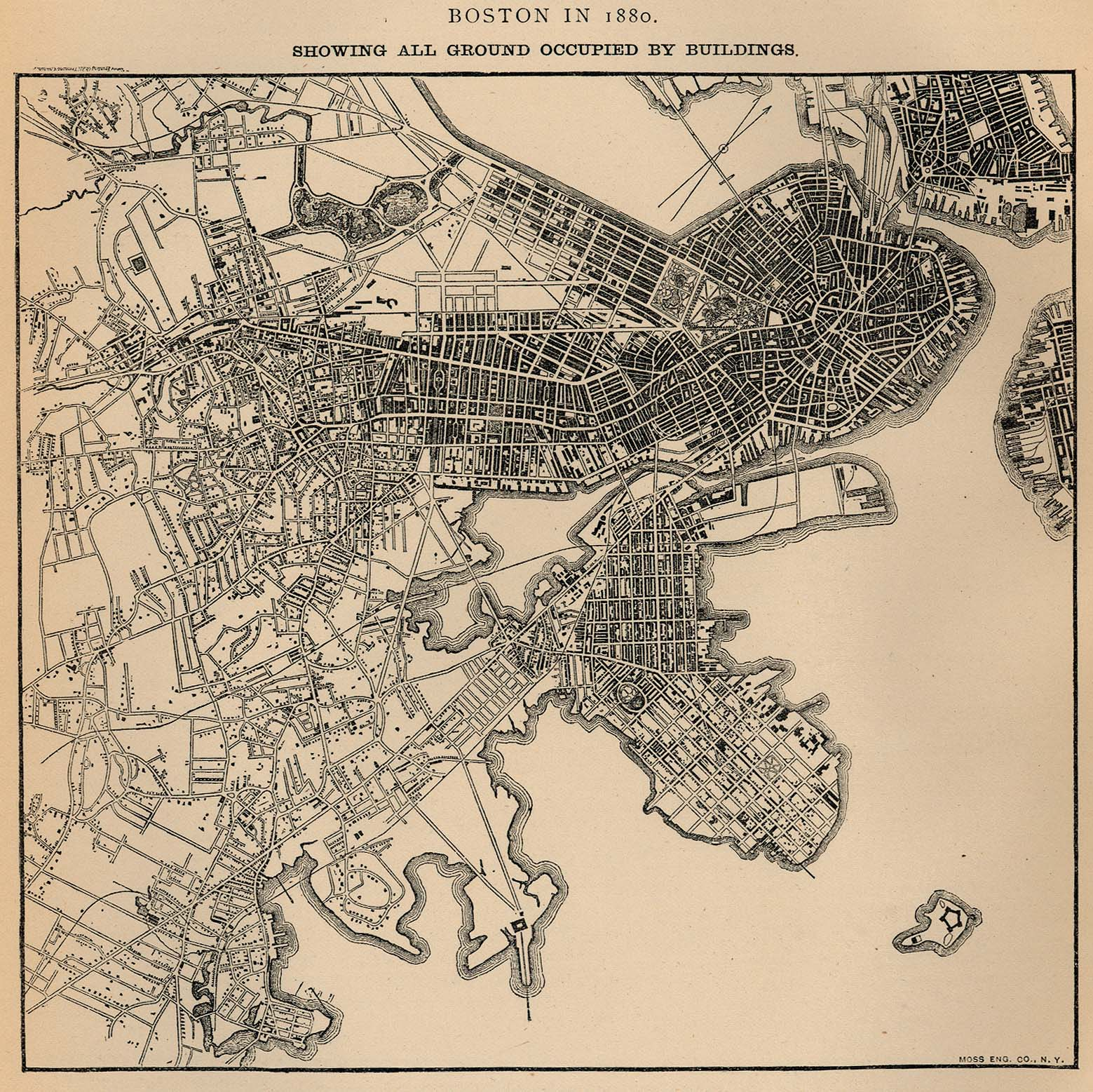
Map showing all ground in Boston occupied by buildings in 1880. Columbia Point is in the center near bottom with two roads going out to the pumping station and calf pasture. From U.S. Census Bureau.

In the 1880s, the calf pasture was used as a Boston sewer line and pumping station, known as the Calf Pasture Pumping Station Complex. This large granite structure, the first sewage treatment station built in the city, was built in 1883. It still stands and in its time was a model for treating sewage and helping to promote cleaner and healthier urban living conditions. It pumped waste to a remote treatment facility on Moon Island in Boston Harbor, and served as a model for other systems worldwide. This system remained in active use and was the Boston Sewer system's headworks, handling all of the city's sewage, until 1968 when a new treatment facility was built on Deer Island. The pumping station is also architecturally significant as a Richardsonian Romanesque designed by the then Boston city architect, George Clough. It is also the only remaining 19th-century building on Columbia Point.

The facility was listed on the National Register of Historic Places in 1990. In January 2020, the University of Massachusetts Building Authority issued a request for information from developers to restore the facility and to construct a mixed-use facility on an adjacent 10-acre site, receiving eight proposals in response by the following September. In July 2021, UMass officials issued a request for proposal for the facility and the adjacent site. In April 2024, the Boston Landmarks Commission held a virtual public meeting on whether to designate the facility as a Boston Landmark. The Commission approved a report recommending the site as an official city landmark designation, pending official approval. In November 2024, the Calf Pasture Pumping Station was designated a Boston Landmark.

== See also ==
- National Register of Historic Places listings in southern Boston, Massachusetts
