= St. Mark's Methodist Church (Brookline, Massachusetts) =

Historic church in Massachusetts, United States

- U.S. National Register of Historic Places
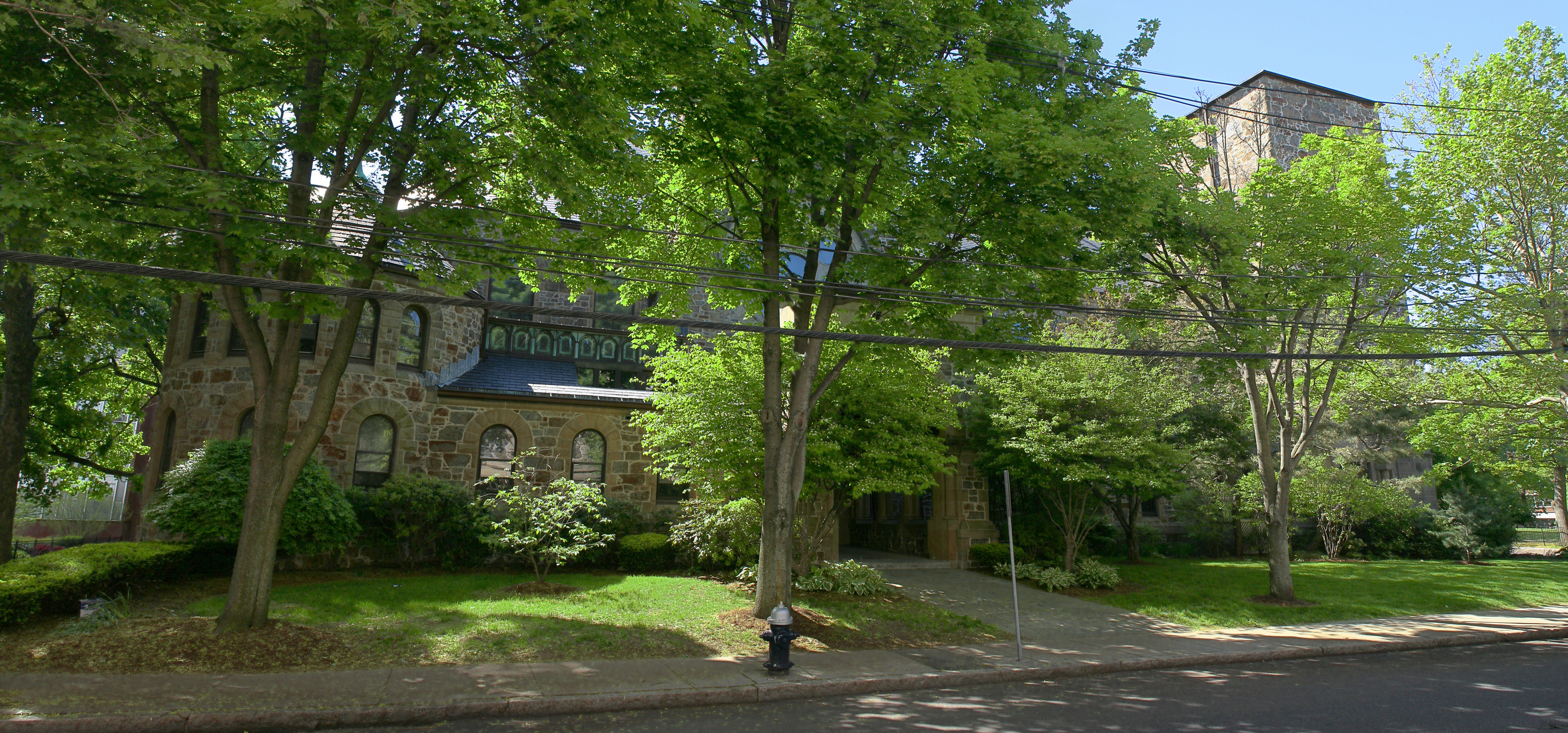

- Location within Massachusetts Location within the United States
- Location: 90 Park St., Brookline, Massachusetts
- Coordinates: 42°20′21″N 71°7′31″W
- Area: 1.1 acres (0.45 ha)
- Built: 1892
- Architect: George Albert Clough
- Architectural style: Romanesque
- NRHP reference No.: 76000268
- Added to NRHP: December 17, 1976

St. Mark's Methodist Church is a historic church building at 90 Park Street in Brookline, Massachusetts. The church cornerstone was laid on April 9, 1892. The building was designed by Brookline architect George A. Clough in a Romanesque style. The building, vacated by its dwindling congregation in 1968, was listed on the National Register of Historic Places in 1976. It has since been converted into condominiums.

== Description and history ==
The former St. Mark's Methodist Church building is located in a residential area just southwest of Coolidge Corner, at the southwest corner of Vernon and Park Streets. It is set just south of the triangular Judge Henry Crowley Park at Saint Mark's Square. The church is laid out in a cruciform shape, characteristic of Romanesque architectural tradition, with the nave running north-south, and the transept in an east-west orientation. The walls are constructed of locally quarried variegated Brighton ledge stone, with trimmings of gray Nova Scotia sandstone and heavy columns of Indiana limestone. The north facade faces the park, flanked by a square tower on the left, and a square projection on the right. Set in the main roof gable in between is a large rose window. The square tower and right-side projection each have a rounded corner tower topped by a conical roof. The original main entrance is through the base of the tower. The long sides of the church each have five round-arch windows, leading to the transept area, where there are gabled projections on either side.

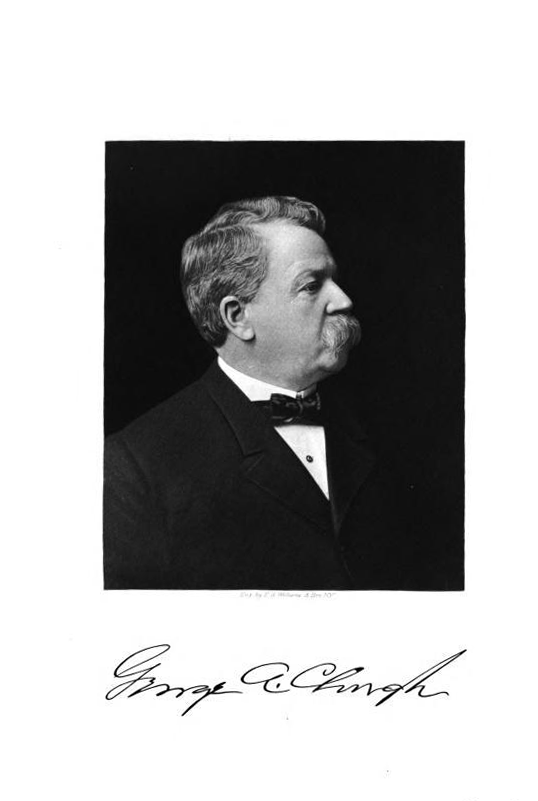
Portrait and signature of Brookline resident George Albert Clough, the architect of St. Mark's Methodist Church.

The church was built in 1891-96 for the Methodist Society of Brookline, which retained Brookline architect George A. Clough for its design. The St. Mark's was dedicated on October 14, 15, and 18, 1896. The original design of the church called for a carillon tower to be constructed on top of the left side tower, but the area's landfill geology was insufficiently stable to support it. The church was used by this congregation until 1968, when it moved to facilities shared with two other Brookline congregations. The building has since been converted to residential use

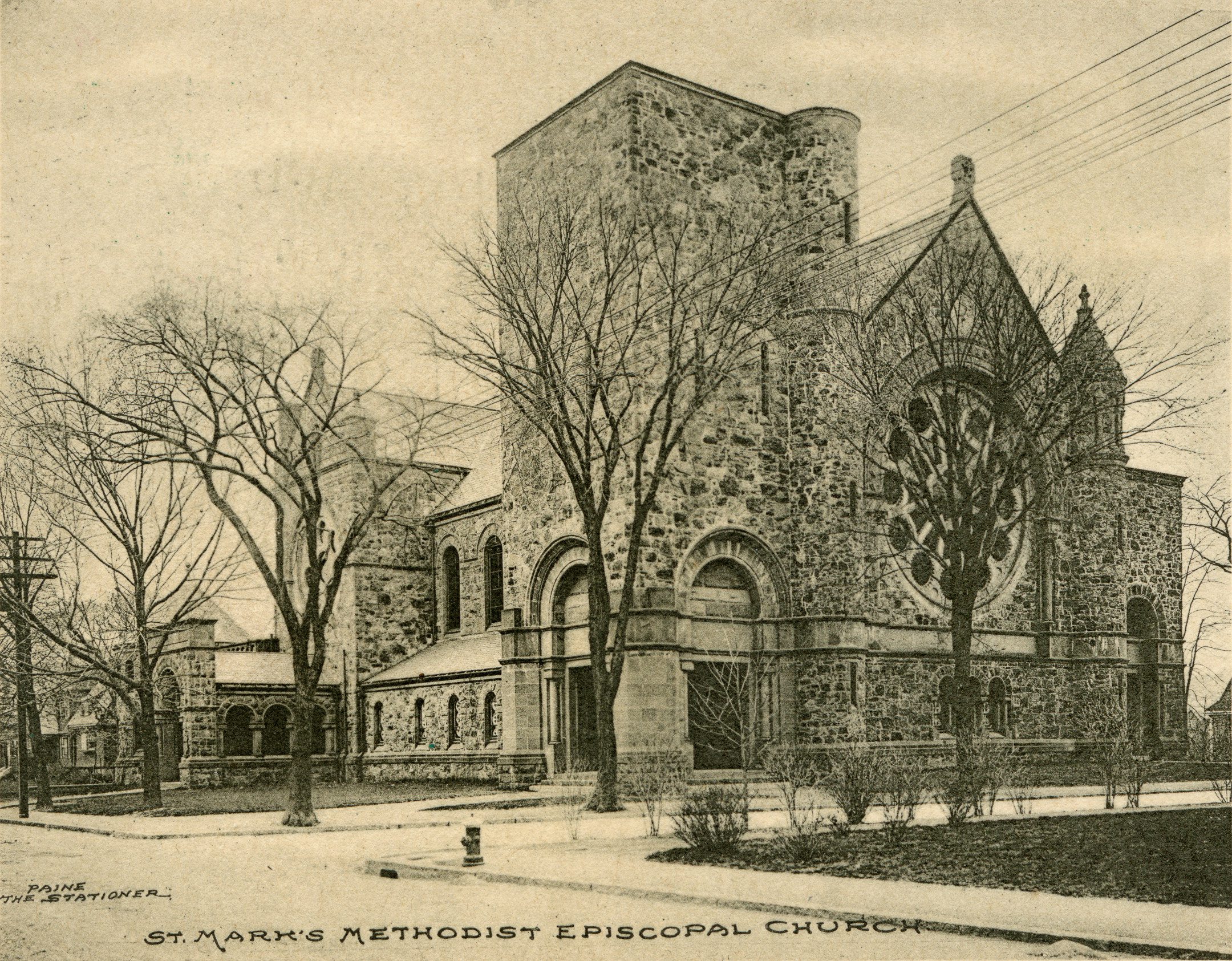
Historical photograph dated 1907, and originally sold as a picture postcard by a local stationer. The structure looks much the same today.

== See also ==
- National Register of Historic Places listings in Brookline, Massachusetts
