= East Blue Hill, Maine =

- Village
- Location within Maine
- Coordinates: 44°25′03″N 68°31′21″W
- Country: United States
- State: Maine
- County: Hancock
- Town: Blue Hill
- Elevation: 23 ft (7.0 m)

Population (2010)
  - Total: 107
- Time zone: UTC-5 (Eastern (EST))
  - Summer (DST): UTC-4 (EDT)
- ZIP code: 04629
- Area code: 207
- GNIS feature ID: 565524

East Blue Hill is an unincorporated village in the town of Blue Hill, Hancock County, Maine, United States. The community is located along Maine State Route 176, 10 miles (16 km) south-southwest of Ellsworth.

== History ==
The first European settler of East Blue Hill was trapper James McHard in the 1790s. The village was known as "McHard's" until 1871, when it became known as East Blue Hill.
