= Jonathan Fisher (preacher) =

American minister (1768–1847)

A self-portrait by Fisher

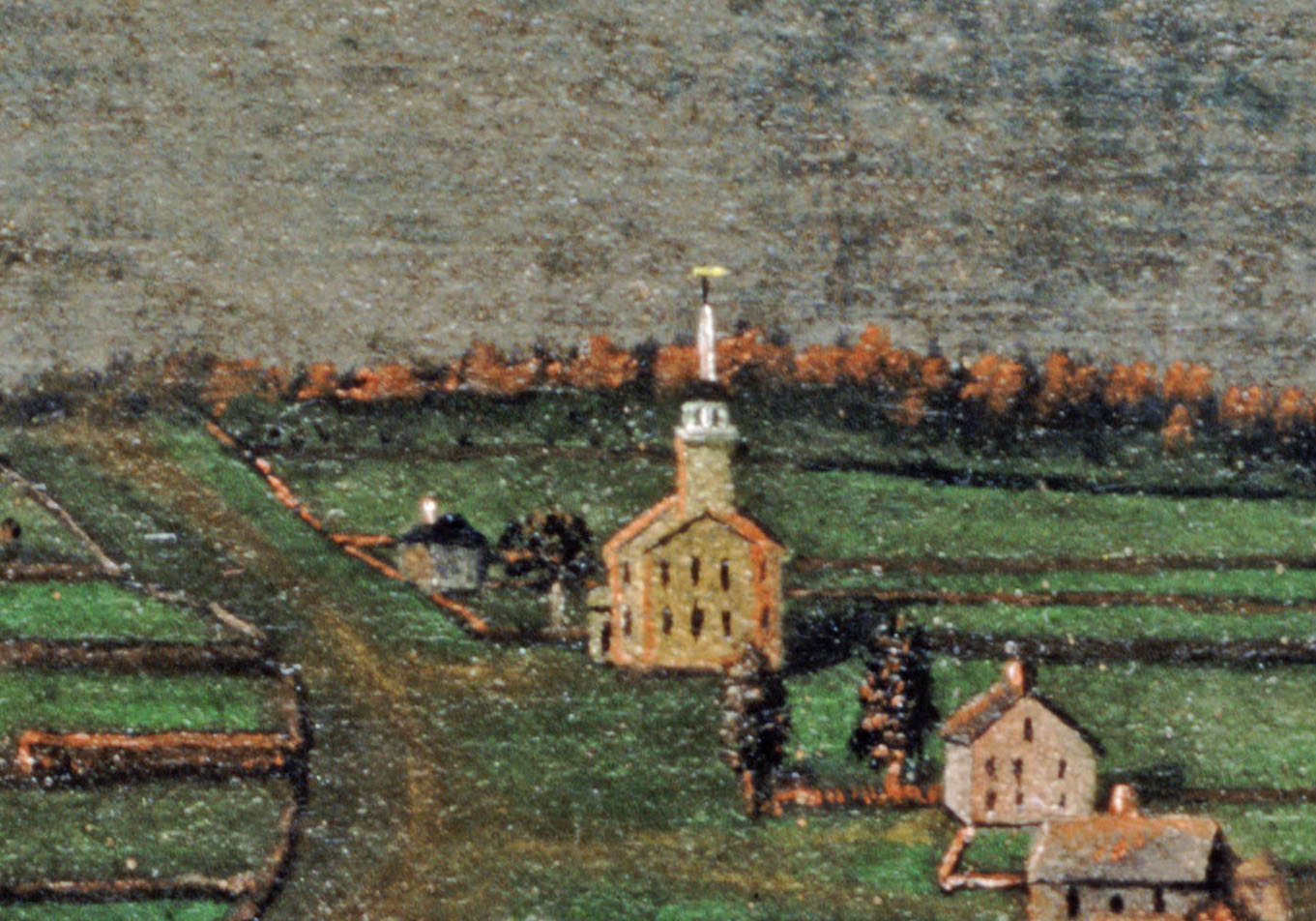
Fisher's Meetinghouse

Parson Jonathan Fisher (1768–1847) was an American Christian preacher and artist. He was the first Congregational minister from 1794 to 1837 in the village of Blue Hill, Maine, in the United States and helped found the Bangor Theological Seminary.

== Biography ==
Jonathan Fisher was born in New Braintree, Massachusetts in 1768 as one of seven children born to Jonathan and Katherine Avery Fisher. He was raised in the home of his uncle a minister, after his father, a Revolutionary War soldier, had died. As a young man he considered becoming a blacksmith, cabinet maker, or clockmaker.He went to Harvard University in 1788 where he studied liberal arts and divinity, supporting himself by waiting on other students in the dining hall and selling watercolors of wildlife. During this time he developed a shorthand or code in which his notes were kept.

Fisher later learned to paint with oils and make engravings, building his own press to strike prints. He created a natural history book written for children named "Scripture Animals", which depicted every creature named in the Bible. He also illustrated several of his own books with his own paintings and engravings, as well as engraving a bookplate for the Blue Hill Library which is still used in the 21st century.

Fisher went to Blue Hill, Maine, in 1796 as the first settled pastor of the Congregational Church. In the same year, he married Dolly Battle. Jonathan and Dolly had eight children, and Fisher remained at Blue Hill until his death.

By November 2, 1797, Fisher had built his original house with the aid of his parishioners. The first house, which was in use for 100 years, was torn down by a Fisher descendant in 1896. It formed the shell of the present house which was begun in 1814, also built by Fisher.

Fisher played a central role in the Congregationalist Church where he administered the sacraments and admonished or excommunicated those who failed to abide by church doctrine. Fisher constantly chided himself for his pleasure in "temporal" matters such as painting and mathematics, which he believed took away from his primary religious responsibilities both to himself and his congregation. Fisher read his Hebrew Bible at five o'clock each morning, and he practiced Hebrew, Latin, and Greek. Four or five young men boarded with his family as he instructed them in Latin and Greek.

Fisher was active in many fields of work to accumulate wealth. This included farming his own acres, concocting medical remedies, braiding straw hats, sawing out buttons from the bones of farm animals and dead household pets, repairing furniture, painting names on vessels or painting sleighs at $2.50 each, and crafting pumps, chairs, chests, hair-combs, tables, bureaus, bedsteads, cradles, and drumsticks for the local militia at 25 cents a pair. He was the author of several books and poems.

Fisher participated in missionary journeys and was an active Trustee of the Bangor Theological Seminary. He supported the American Society for the Colonization of Liberia.

Mary Ellen Chase, JONATHAN FISHER: MAINE PARSON 1768 - 1847

== Notebooks and journals ==
Throughout his life, Fisher kept a daily journal, and copies of all his letters. His notebooks and sketchbooks record his observations and interests in scientific matters, surveying, engineering, mathematics, geometry, agriculture, and natural history.

A journal digitised by the United States' National Oceanic and Atmospheric Administration describes Fisher's observations of sunspots during 1816-1817.

Mariner's Compass, 1791

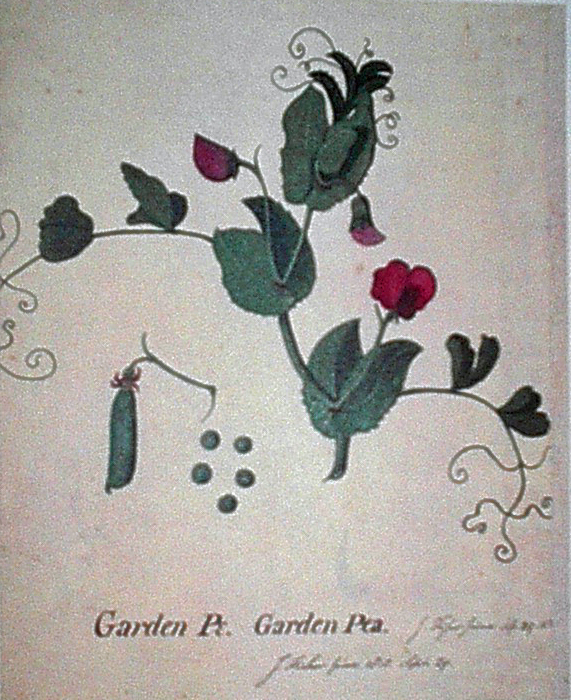
Garden Pea

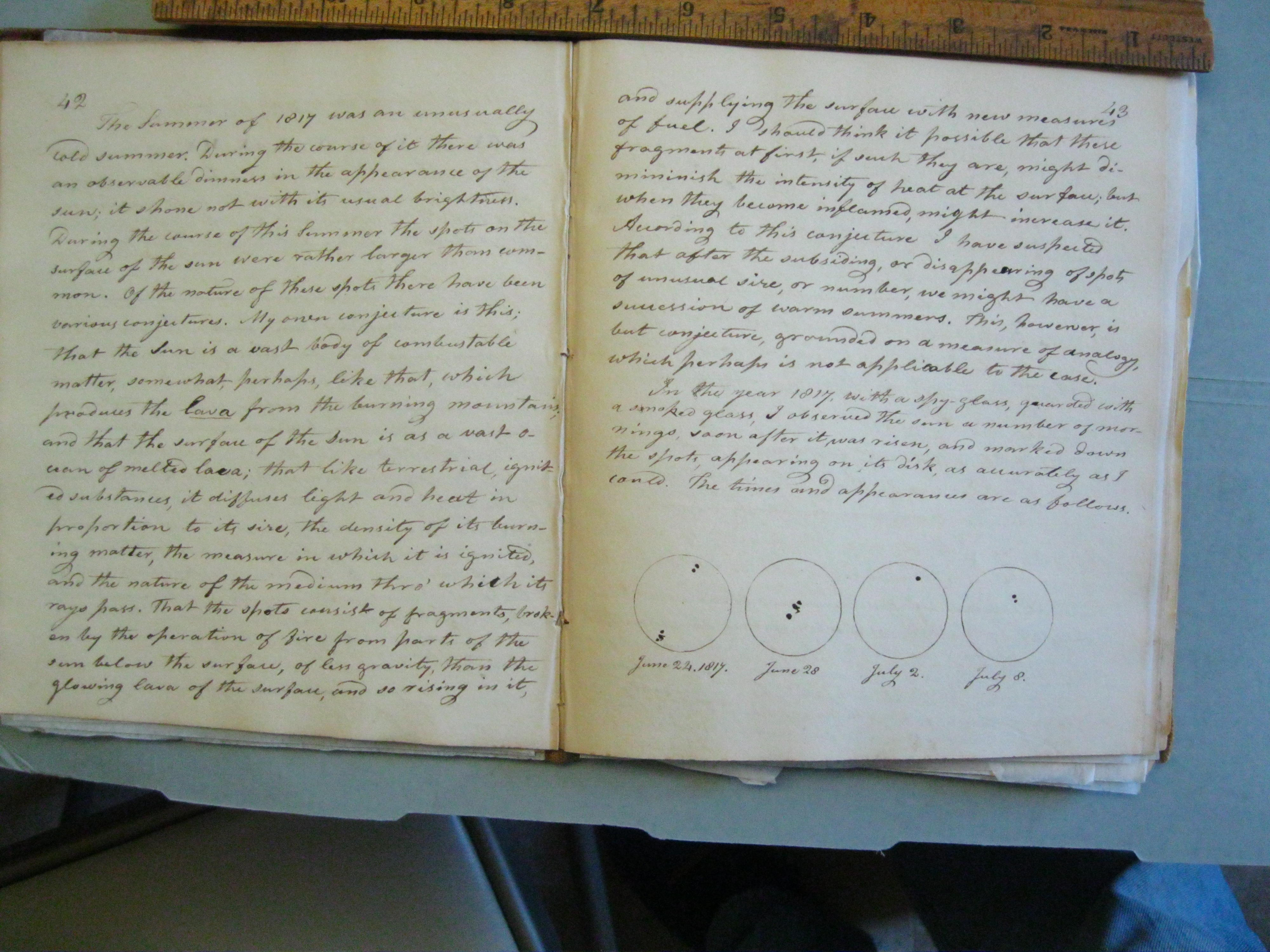
Descriptions of sunspots

== Writings by Jonathan Fisher ==
- Scripture Animals, or Natural History of the Living Creatures Named in the Bible Written Especially for Youth Illustrated with Cuts. By Jonathan *Fisher, A.M. Portland, Published by William Hyde, (1834)
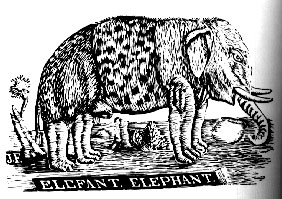
Elephant

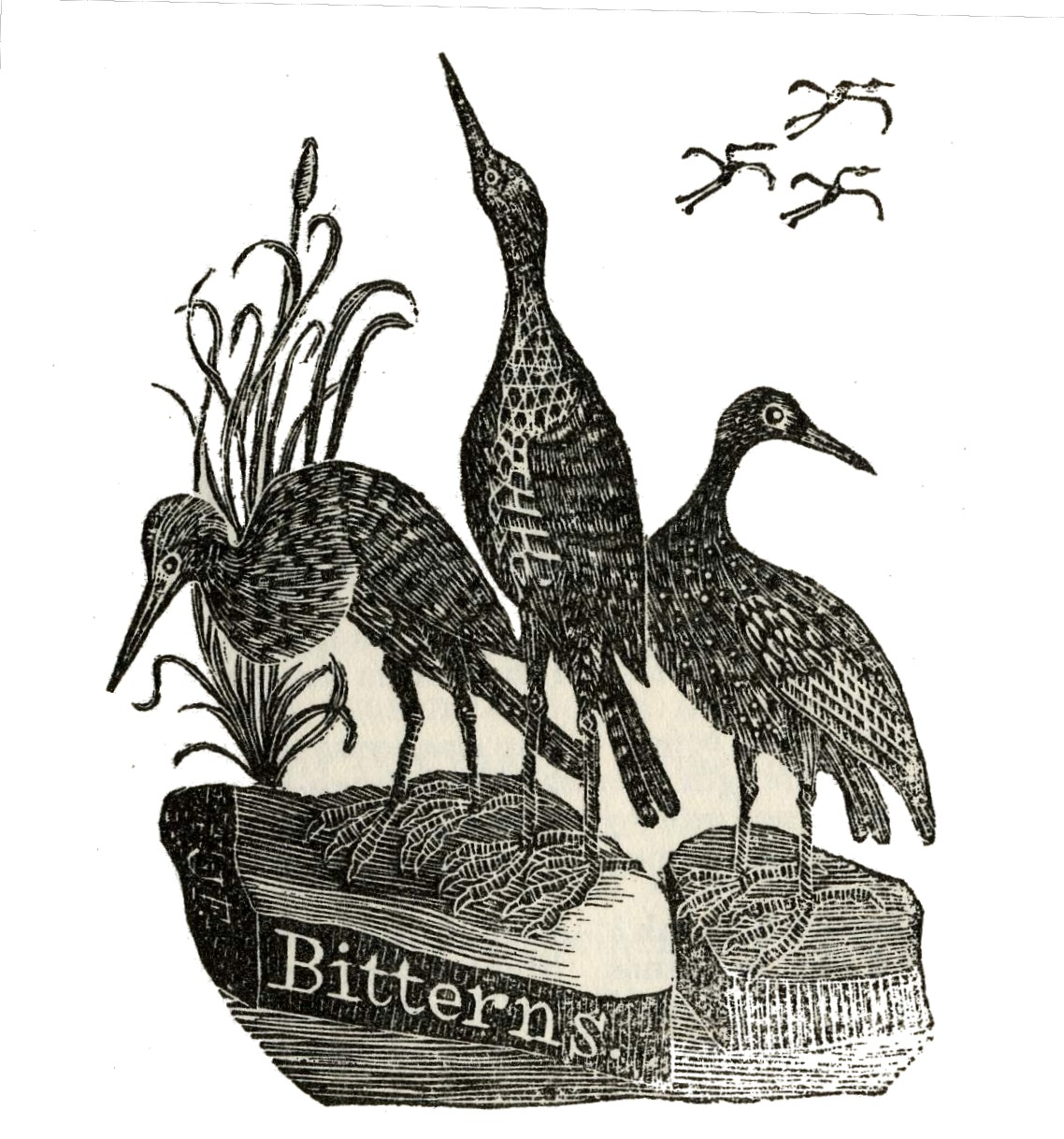
Bitterns

== Jonathan Fisher House ==
Jonathan Fisher's home in Blue Hill, Maine is open to the public seasonally. It is maintained and operated by The Jonathan Fisher Memorial, Inc., and was listed on the National Register of Historic Places in 1969.

Front View

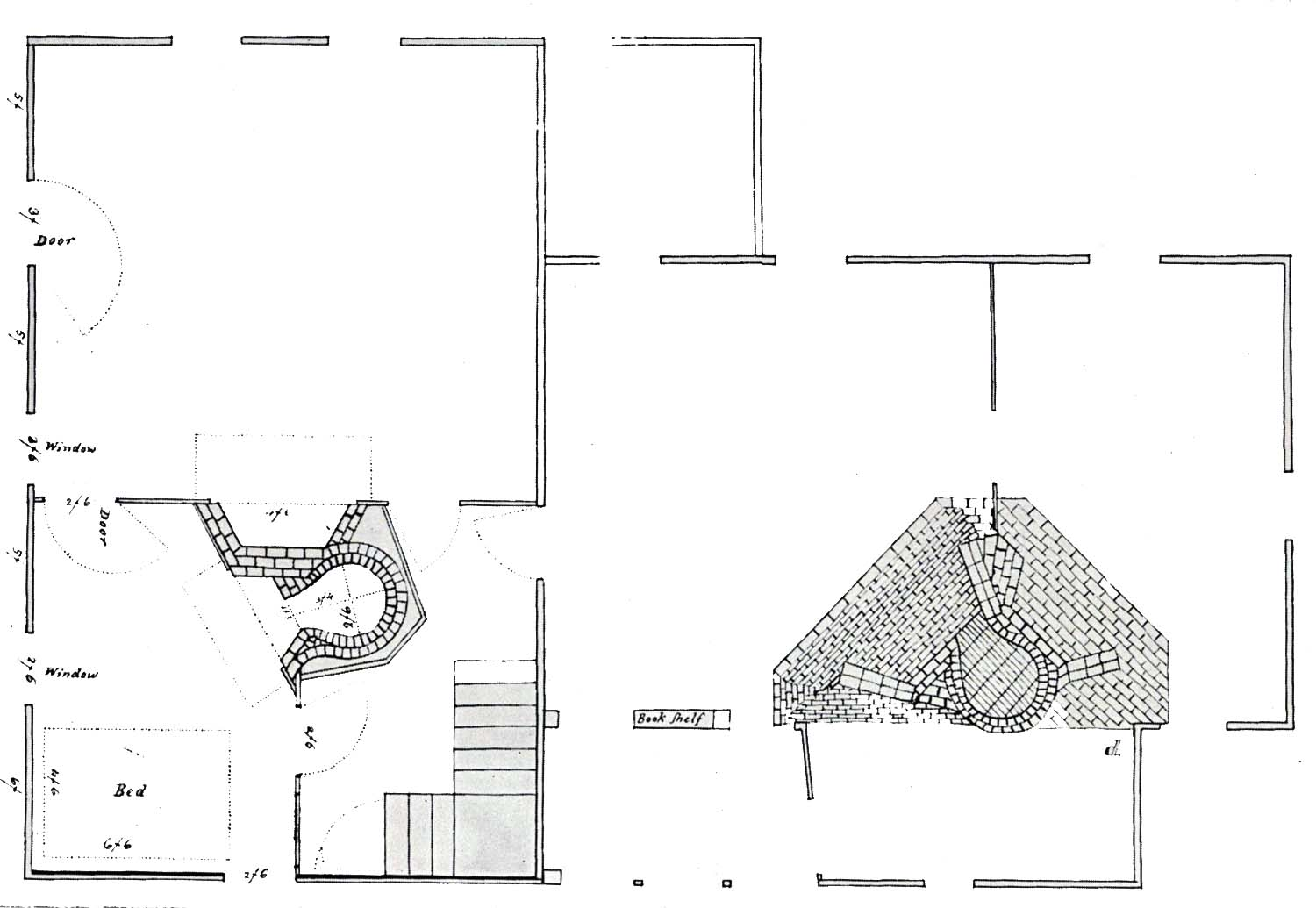
Fisher's Floorplan

Parson Fisher's Study

== Legacy ==
In 1908 several stained glass windows were installed in the church; one of these is a representation of the Angel with the Anchor, which was dedicated in memory of Rev. Fisher and his great-grandson Norman Fisher.

In 1970, Fisher's parsonage was donated to the church by his descendant Ethelwyn Hinckley.

== Jonathan Fisher bibliography ==
- Jonathan Fisher, Maine Parson, 1768-1847- Mary Ellen Chase, New York, MacMillan Company (1948)
- Index to Mary Ellen Chase Jonathan Fisher, Maine Parson prepared by Rev. Gary Vencill
- A Goodly Heritage - PART II, 'The Puritan Tradition', Chapter I, 'The Early Church in Blue Hill', Chapter II, 'The Correspondence of Reverend Mr. Fisher' - Mary Ellen Chase, New York, Henry Holt and Company, Inc. (1932)
- Let Every Hour Be Filled to the Brim, Down East Magazine Article, September, 1995
- Historic Maine Parsonage - The Jonathan Fisher House, Blue Hill, Maine - article by Esther E. Wood, Daughters of the American Revolution Magazine, August–September 1961
- Jonathan Fisher of Blue Hill Maine - Kevin D. Murphy, University of Massachusetts Press, (2010)
- A Lantern in the Wind - The Life of Mary Ellen Chase - Elienne Squire, Fithian Press, Santa Barbara - (1995).
- Head of the Bay - Sketches and Pictures of Blue Hill, Maine - Annie L. Clough The Shoreacre Press, (1953)
- Maine in the Early Republic: From Revolution to Statehood - Chapter 11, 'Jonathan Fisher and the 'Universe of Being' by Richard Moss. University Press of New England (1988).
- Versatility Yankee Style: the Cultural Diversity of Rev. Jonathan Fisher, John H. Bellamy and the Hardy family (1977)
- Versatile Yankee: The Art of Jonathan Fisher, 1768-1847 by Alice Winchester. Princeton, NJ, Pyne Press, 1973
- A Wondrous Journey, Jonathan Fisher and the Making of Scripture Animals - Jane Bianco, Rockland, ME, Farnsworth Art Museum (2013)
- Biographical Sketch of the Rev. Jonathan Fisher of Blue Hill, Maine by Gaylord Hall (1945)
- Memoir of Rev. Jonathan Fisher of Blue Hill, Maine (1889)
- "The House the Parson Built" by Abbott Lowell Cummings. Old Time New England Magazine, Volume: 56 Number: 204, Spring, 1966
- Smith, Raoul The Life of Jonathan Fisher (1768-1847) Volume 1 (from his birth through the year 1798), self-published, 2006. 317 pp.
- Smith, Raoul The Language of Jonathan Fisher (1768-1847). Publications of the American Dialect Society, No. 72. University of Alabama Press, 1985. 194 pp.
- Smith, Raoul "The Speech of Jonathan Fisher (1768-1847) of Blue Hill, Maine," Annual Proceedings of the Dublin Seminar for New England Folklife, ed. by P. Benes, Boston University Press, 1985, pp. 70–76.
- Smith, Raoul "An Early American Unpublished Hebrew-English Lexicon," Jewish Language Review, 3(1983):19-28.
- Smith, Raoul"A Description of the Penobscot and Passamaquoddy Indians in 1808," Man in the Northeast 14(1978):52-56.
- Smith, Raoul "An Early Nineteenth Century Penobscot Wordlist," International Journal of American Linguistics 43(1977):101-4.
- Smith, R. and G. Pappin, "The Coded Manuscripts of Jonathan Fisher (1768-1847): Some Techniques in Generating and Editing Parallel Texts, SIGLASH (Special Interest Group on Language Analysis and Studies in the Humanities of the Association for Computing Machinery) Newsletter, 9.4(1976):10-21.
- Smith, Raoul "The Philosophical Alphabet of Jonathan Fisher (1768-1847)," American Speech 50(1975):36-49.
- Brophy, Alfred L., Property and Progress: Antebellum Landscape Art and Property Law, McGeorge law Review 40 (2009):603-59.
