= Blue Hill, Maine =

Town in Maine, United States

- Town
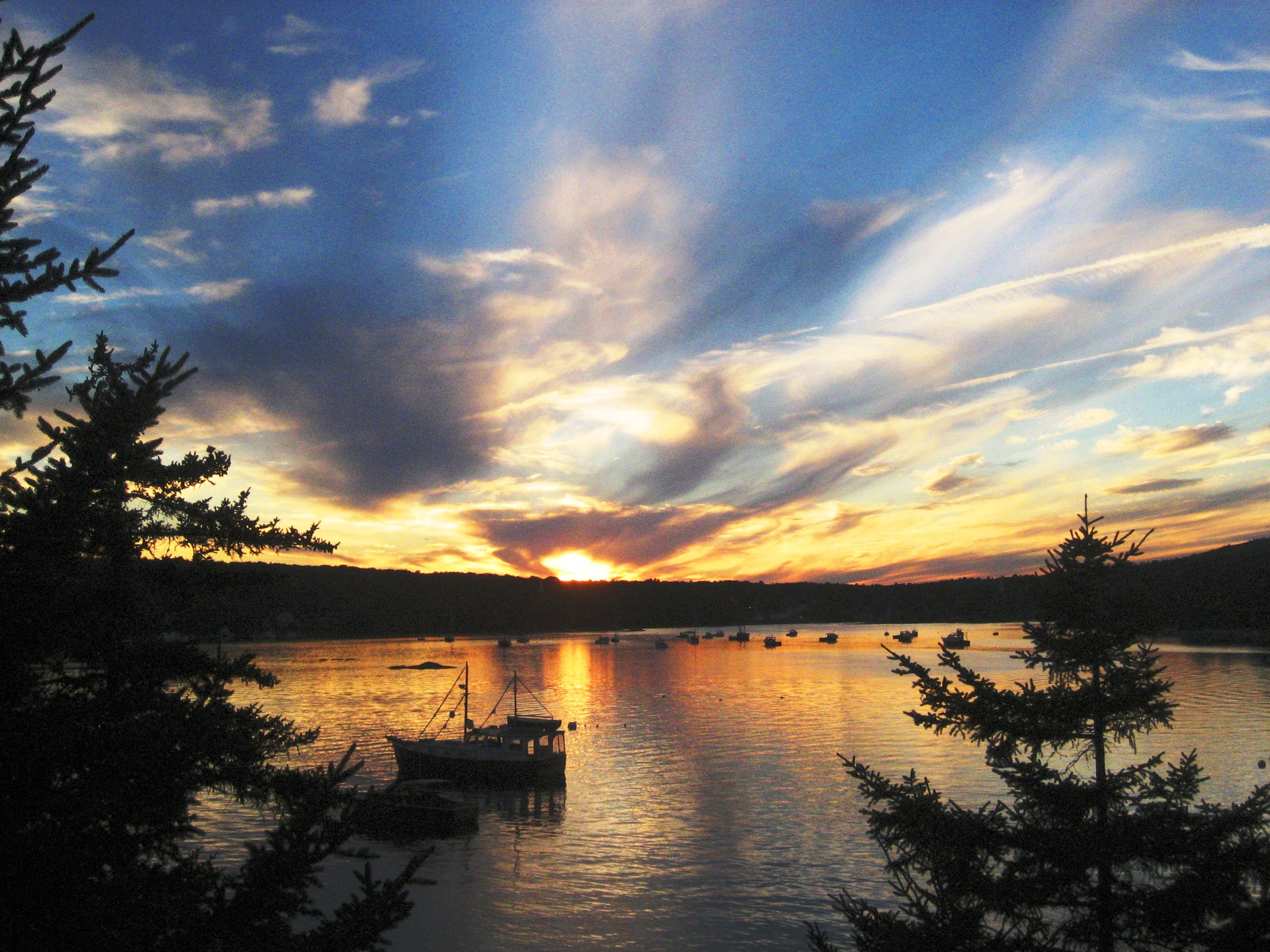
- Blue Hill from Parker Point

- Logo
- Motto: "Got lost Blue Hill, Maine"
- Location within Maine Location within the United States
- Coordinates: 44°25′02″N 68°37′20″W
- Country: United States
- State: Maine
- County: Hancock
- Incorporated: 1789
- Villages: Blue Hill; Blue Hill Falls; East Blue Hill; North Blue Hill; South Blue Hill

Area
  - Total: 86.57 sq mi (224.22 km^{2})
  - Land: 62.48 sq mi (161.82 km^{2})
  - Water: 24.09 sq mi (62.39 km^{2})
- Elevation: 7 ft (2.1 m)

Population (2020)
  - Total: 2,792
  - Density: 45/sq mi (17.3/km^{2})
- Time zone: UTC-5 (Eastern (EST))
  - Summer (DST): UTC-4 (EDT)
- ZIP code: 04614
- Area code: 207
- FIPS code: 23-05700
- GNIS feature ID: 582357
- Website: bluehillme.gov

Blue Hill is a town in Hancock County, Maine, United States, located on Blue Hill Bay. The population was 2,792 at the 2020 census. It is home to the Blue Hill Public Library, Blue Hill Memorial Hospital, George Stevens Academy, the Blue Hill Harbor School, The Bay School, New Surry Theatre, Kneisel Hall, Bagaduce Music Lending Library, Seaside Cemetery, the Kollegewidgwok Yacht Club, the Shaw Institute, and the Blue Hill Country Club. The town also hosts the annual Blue Hill Fair.

== History ==
It was one of six townships granted by the Massachusetts General Court to David Marsh and 351 others for their service in the French and Indian War. Called Plantation Number 5, it was first settled in 1762 by Captain Joseph Wood and John Roundy from Andover, Massachusetts, who built homes on Mill Island at the tidal falls. It would then be called Newport Plantation. On January 30, 1789, the town was incorporated as Blue Hill, named after its commanding summit overlooking the region.

The First Congregational Church was formed in 1772, the first Congregational church organized east of Penobscot Bay.

The outlets of various ponds provided water power for several sawmills and gristmills. By 1859, 5,000 cords of firewood were sent from the port annually. Other products included lumber, masts and roof shingles, but the predominant industry was shipbuilding. Beginning in 1792, 133 vessels were constructed at Blue Hill, some of them brigs and ships, but most schooners. The town was also noted for the quality of its granite, some of which was used to build the Brooklyn Bridge, New York Stock Exchange Building, and the U.S. Custom House at Norfolk, Virginia. In 1876, local quarries employed 300 workers.

A Viking penny was found in 1957 at the nearby prehistoric Goddard archeological site by local amateur archeologist Guy Mellgren. The coin is believed to be from the 11th century reign of Olaf Kyrre.

== Geography ==
According to the United States Census Bureau, the town has a total area of 86.57 square miles (224.22 km^{2}), of which 62.48 square miles (161.82 km^{2}) is land and 24.09 square miles (62.39 km^{2}) is water. Located on Blue Hill Bay, the town is drained by Mill Brook. Blue Hill, elevation 940 feet (290 meters), is the town's highest point. Long Island, situated in Blue Hill Bay, is part of the town.

Blue Hill is crossed by state routes 15, 172, 176 and 177. It borders the towns of Surry to the northeast, Brooklin to the southeast, Sedgwick to the southwest, and Penobscot to the northwest. The town is the site of Blue Hill Airport.

== Demographics ==
Historical population
Census	Pop.	Note	%±
1790	274		—
1800	494		80.3%
1810	658		33.2%
1820	957		45.4%
1830	1,486		55.3%
1840	1,891		27.3%
1850	1,939		2.5%
1860	1,993		2.8%
1870	1,707		−14.4%
1880	2,213		29.6%
1890	1,980		−10.5%
1900	1,828		−7.7%
1910	1,462		−20.0%
1920	1,564		7.0%
1930	1,439		−8.0%
1940	1,343		−6.7%
1950	1,308		−2.6%
1960	1,270		−2.9%
1970	1,367		7.6%
1980	1,644		20.3%
1990	1,941		18.1%
2000	2,390		23.1%
2010	2,686		12.4%
2020	2,792		3.9%
U.S. Decennial Census

=== 2010 census ===
As of the census of 2010, there were 2,686 people, 1,279 households, and 733 families living in the town. The population density was 43.0 inhabitants per square mile (16.6/km^{2}). There were 1,936 housing units at an average density of 31.0 per square mile (12.0/km^{2}). The racial makeup of the town was 97.3% White, 0.4% African American, 0.4% Native American, 1.1% Asian, 0.1% from other races, and 0.7% from two or more races. Hispanic or Latino of any race were 0.8% of the population.

There were 1,279 households, of which 21.5% had children under the age of 18 living with them, 47.0% were married couples living together, 7.3% had a female householder with no husband present, 3.0% had a male householder with no wife present, and 42.7% were non-families. 34.1% of all households were made up of individuals, and 16.5% had someone living alone who was 65 years of age or older. The average household size was 2.08 and the average family size was 2.66.

The median age in the town was 49.5 years. 17.5% of residents were under the age of 18; 6.5% were between the ages of 18 and 24; 18.6% were from 25 to 44; 36.8% were from 45 to 64; and 20.7% were 65 years of age or older. The gender makeup of the town was 46.9% male and 53.1% female.

=== 2000 census ===
As of the census of 2000, there were 2,390 people, 1,074 households, and 681 families living in the town. The population density was 38.2 inhabitants per square mile (14.7/km^{2}). There were 1,486 housing units at an average density of 23.8 per square mile (9.2/km^{2}). The racial makeup of the town was 97.87% White, 0.38% African American, 0.21% Native American, 0.13% Asian, 0.08% from other races, and 1.34% from two or more races. Hispanic or Latino of any race were 0.13% of the population.

There were 1,074 households, out of which 26.2% had children under the age of 18 living with them, 51.1% were married couples living together, 9.3% had a female householder with no husband present, and 36.5% were non-families. 30.6% of all households were made up of individuals, and 15.5% had someone living alone who was 65 years of age or older. The average household size was 2.23 and the average family size was 2.73.

In the town, the population was spread out, with 21.5% under the age of 18, 6.3% from 18 to 24, 22.9% from 25 to 44, 30.3% from 45 to 64, and 19.0% who were 65 years of age or older. The median age was 45 years. For every 100 females, there were 89.4 males. For every 100 females age 18 and over, there were 85.8 males.

The median income for a household in the town was $31,484, and the median income for a family was $41,688. Males had a median income of $28,200 versus $23,616 for females. The per capita income for the town was $19,189. About 9.3% of families and 13.5% of the population were below the poverty line, including 17.4% of those under age 18 and 12.8% of those age 65 or over.

== Education ==
It is in the Blue Hill School District. There is a K-8 school, Blue Hill Consolidated School. It was built in 1939 as part of the New Deal. The Blue Hill School is a part of School Union 93.

Blue Hill pays George Stevens Academy, a private school, to educate its students at the high school level.

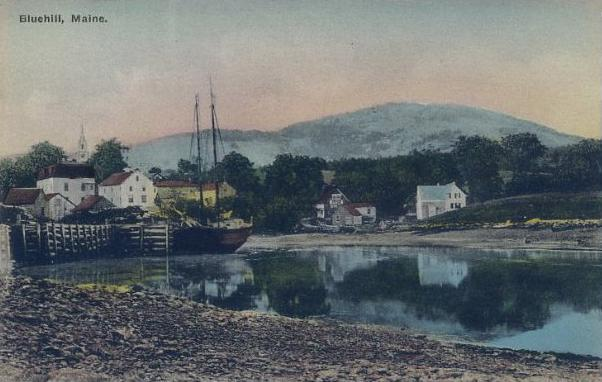
Blue Hill c. 1920

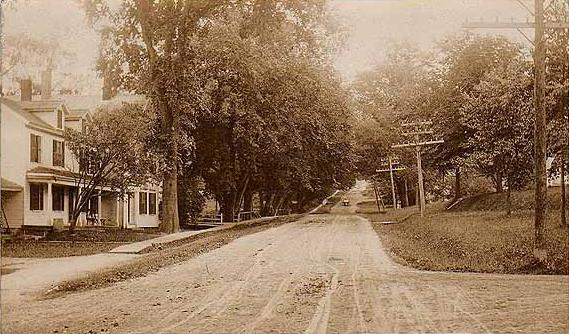
Main Street c. 1909

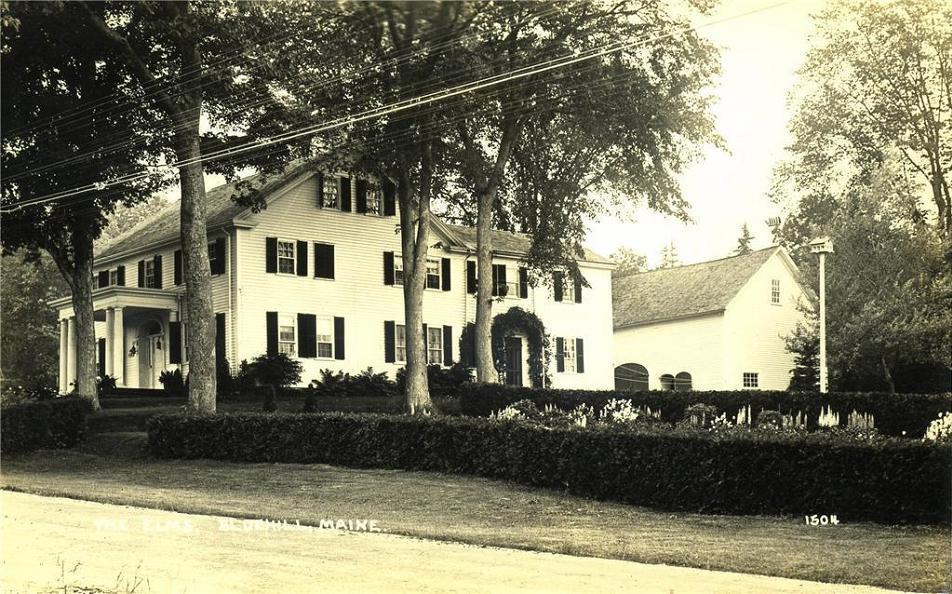
The Elms c. 1920

== Notable people ==
- Gerald Warner Brace, author
- Minerva Kline Brooks, campaigner for women's suffrage
- Mary Ellen Chase, author
- George Albert Clough, architect
- A. J. Cronin, author
- Daniel Dennett, philosopher, cognitive scientist
- Jonathan Fisher, minister
- Patty Griffin, Singer/Songwriter
- June Harding, actress, artist
- Effie Hinckley Ober Kline, opera impresario, philanthropist
- Jonathan Lethem, Author
- Bill McHenry, musician
- Nina Milliken, politician and resident of Blue Hill
- Seth Morgan, novelist (buried in Seaside Cemetery)
- Ethelbert Nevin, composer
- Horatio Parker, composer
- Graham Platner, 2026 Democratic US Senate candidate
- Brian D. Rogers, chancellor of the University of Alaska Fairbanks
- Susan Shaw, environmental health scientist, founder of the Shaw Institute
- Noel Paul Stookey, musician
- Bertha Tapper, pianist
- Walter C. Teagle, president and chairman at Standard Oil
- Janwillem van de Wetering, author
- Emma Willmann, comedian, actress
- Esther E. Wood, historian, educator, author, and journalist
