= New England road marking system =

Regional Road Network

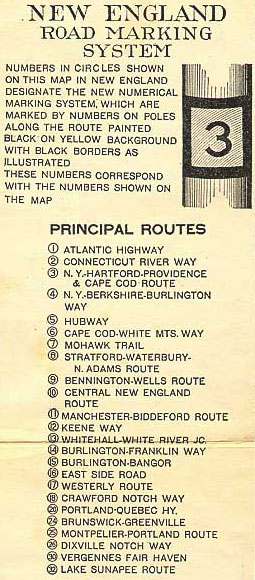
1922 list

The New England road marking system was a regional system of marked numbered routes in the six-state region of New England in the United States. The routes were marked by a yellow rectangular sign with black numbers and border. Many signs were painted on telephone poles. The routes were approved by the highway departments of the six New England states in April 1922.

Prior to the New England road marking system, through routes were mainly marked with colored bands on telephone poles. These were assigned by direction (red for east–west, blue for north–south and yellow for intermediate or diagonal routes). The Massachusetts Highway Commission convinced the rest of southern New England and New York to use this system in 1915 (New Hampshire and Vermont already had their own schemes, and Maine also opted out), and it was the main system until 1922.

The New England road marking system, while limited to New England, was designed for expansion to the whole country. One- and two-digit numbers were assigned to major interstate routes, with three-digit routes for state routes (marked in a rectangle, with the state abbreviation below the number). In general, odd numbers ran east–west and even numbers ran north–south. The main exception was Route 1, which was to run along the Atlantic coast from Florida to Calais, Maine. A few of the major auto trails were not to be assigned numbers, instead being marked with letters—for instance, L for the Lincoln Highway and R for the Roosevelt International Highway.

In 1926, several of the routes were supplanted by the national United States Numbered Highway System. Except for Route 1, which became U.S. Route 1, the old numbers were not used, since the U.S. Highway System uses odd numbers for north–south routes and even numbers for east–west routes. While some of the routes that did not become U.S. Routes were disbanded in the 1930s, many of these routes were transferred to state highway systems, often retaining their original route numbers.

== Background ==
Before 1915, there was no uniform method to mark major throughways in New England or New York. Vermont and New Hampshire had existing pole marking schemes, though these varied between the states. Vermont's system was unique because route colors were not determined by direction, but by funding and responsibility for maintenance. Maine also had an existing lettering scheme, established in 1914. Many states at this time had numbering systems solely for government use. For example, Connecticut had established an internal system of trunk lines in 1900, which had grown to 14 routes by 1913, but this system was not signposted. In 1908, the New York legislature had laid out 37 routes slated for maintenance solely by the state, but there was no proper numbering until 1924.

In 1915, the Massachusetts Highway Commission proposed to the New England States and New York to adopt a uniform pole-marking scheme, with red bands signifying major east-west routes, blue bands signifying major north-south routes, and all secondary routes marked yellow. All the states agreed to the system, though New Hampshire and Vermont stipulated that these routes would not replace their existing systems.

This system held in most of these states, though Maine supplanted this system in 1919 with its own system of auto trails. By 1922, it was generally agreed that pole markings in general were too inconsistent from region to region. In April 1922, delegates from the New England states met at a dinner conference hosted by the Automobile Club of America to coordinate a new system. Soon thereafter, the system was approved by the highway commissions of all the states involved, and signing began soon thereafter. Maine did not use the system until 1925.

== Routes by number ==
Number	Length (mi)	Length (km)	Southern or western terminus	Northern or eastern terminus	Local names	Formed	Removed	Notes
Route 1	—	—	New York state line in Greenwich, CT	Canadian border in Calais, ME	Atlantic Highway	1922	1927	Predecessor of US 1
Route 1A	—	—	Route 1 in Westerly, RI	Route 1 in Providence, RI		—	—	Predecessor of RI 3
Route 1A	—	—	Seabrook, NH	Route 1/Route 16 in Portsmouth, NH		—	—	Predecessor of NH 1A
Route 2	—	—	Route 1 in New Haven, CT	Canadian border in Derby Line, VT	Connecticut River Way	1922	1927	Predecessor of US 5
Route 2A	—	—	Route 2 in West Burke, VT	Route 2 in Derby Line, VT		1922	1927	Predecessor of VT 5A
Route 3	—	—	New York state line in Danbury, CT	Provincetown, MA	New York, Hartford, Providence, and Cape Cod Route	1922	1927	Predecessor of US 6 and MA 28
Route 4	—	—	New York state line in Sharon, CT	Canadian border in Highgate Springs, VT	New York, Berkshire, and Burlington Way	1922	1927	Predecessor of US 7
Route 5	—	—	New York state line in Pittsfield, MA	Route 1 in Boston, MA	Hubway	1922	1927	Predecessor of US 20
Route 6	—	—	Route 3 in Orleans, MA	Route 26 in Colebrook, NH	Cape Cod White Mountains Way	1922	1927	Predecessor of US 3, MA 3, MA 6A
Route 6A	—	—	—	—		1922	1927	Predecessor of MA 3A
Route 6B	—	—	Route 6 in Cambridge, MA	—		1922	1927	Predecessor of MA 3B which became MA 38
Route 7	—	—	New York state line in Williamstown, MA	Route 1 in Boston, MA	Mohawk Trail	1922	1927	Predecessor of MA 2
Route 8	—	—	Route 1 in Stratford, CT	Route 9 in Wilmington, VT	Stratford, Waterbury, and North Adams Route	1922	1927	Predecessor of CT 8, MA 8, VT 8
Route 9	—	—	New York state line in Bennington, VT	Route 1 in Wells, ME	Bennington Wells Route	1922	1927	Predecessor of VT 9, NH 9, ME 9
Route 10	—	—	Route 1 in Old Saybrook, CT	Route 18 in Littleton, NH	Central New England Route	1922	1927	Predecessor of CT 9, CT 10, MA 10, NH 10
Route 11	—	—	Route 4 in Manchester, VT	Route 1 in Biddeford, ME	Manchester Biddeford Route	1922	1927	Became VT 11, NH 11, ME 11, ME 111
Route 12	—	—	Route 1 in New London, CT	Route 2 in Newport, VT	Keene Way	1922	1927	Became CT 12, MA 12, NH 12, VT 12, VT 14, VT 16, US 5
Route 12A	—	—	Route 12 in Randolph, VT	Route 12 in Northfield, VT		1922	1927	Became VT 12A
Route 12B	—	—	Route 12 in Hardwick, VT	Route 2/Route 12 in Coventry, VT		1922	1927	Became VT 14
Route 13	—	—	New York state line in Fair Haven, VT	Route 2 in White River Junction, VT	Whitehall White River Junction Way	1922	1927	Became US 4
Route 14	—	—	Route 4/Route 30 in Burlington, VT	Route 6/Route 6A in Franklin, NH	Burlington Franklin Way	1922	1927	Became US 2, VT 14, US 4
Route 15	—	—	Route 4/Route 30 in Winooski, VT	Canadian border in Houlton, ME	Burlington Bangor Way	1922	1927	Became VT 15, US 2
Route 16	—	—	Route 1 in Portsmouth, NH	Route 26 in Errol, NH	East Side Road	1922	1927	Became NH 16
Route 17	—	—	New York state line in Egremont, MA	Route 1 in Stonington, CT	Westerly Route	1922	1927	Replaced by MA 23, US 7, US 44, CT 2
Route 18	—	—	Route 12/Route 14 in Montpelier, VT	Route 1 in Portland, ME	Crawford Notch Way	1922	1927	Replaced by US 2, VT 18, US 302
Route 20	—	—	Route 1 in Brunswick, ME	Canadian border in Jackman, ME	Portland Quebec Highway	1922	1927	Superseded by US 201
Route 24	—	—	Route 1 in Calais, ME	Canadian border in Madawaska, ME	Brunswick Greenville	1922	1927	Superseded by US 1
Route 25	—	—	Route 14 in Barre, VT	Route 1 in Portland, ME	Montpelier Portland Route	1922	1927	Superseded by US 302, NH 25, ME 25
Route 25A	—	—	Route 25 in Orange, VT	Route 25 in Haverhill, NH		1922	1927	Superseded by VT 25, NH 25
Route 26	—	—	Route 6 in Colebrook, NH	Route 1 in Portland, ME	Dixville Notch Way	1922	1927	Superseded by NH 26, ME 26
Route 28	—	—	Route 3 in Wareham, MA	ME 113 Maine state line in Conway, NH		1922	1927	Superseded by MA 28, NH 28, NH 16, NH 25, NH 113, US 302
Route 30	—	—	New York state line in Poultney, VT	Canadian border in Alburgh, VT	Vergennes Fair Haven Route	1922	1927	Replaced by local roads then US 4, VT 30, US 7, US 2, VT 225
Route 30A	—	—	—	—		1922	1927	
Route 30B	—	—	—	—		1922	1927	
Route 32	—	—	Route 1 in Groton, CT	Route 11 in Sunapee, NH	Lake Sunapee Route	1922	1927	Replaced by CT 12, CT 32, MA 32, US 202, NH 9, NH 149, NH 114, NH 103, NH 103B
Route 32A	—	—	Route 32 in Henniker, NH	Route 11 in Sunapee, NH		1922	1927	Superseded by US 202, NH 9, NH 103, NH 103B
Former

== Interstate routes ==
=== Route 1 ===
New England Route 1
- Location: Greenwich, CT–Calais, ME

Route 1, or the Atlantic Highway, began in Greenwich, Connecticut, from which the main highway of the Atlantic Coast continued to New York City. The highway followed the coast of Long Island Sound through Stamford, Norwalk, and Bridgeport to Stratford, where the highway met the southern end of Route 8. Route 1 continued through Milford and had a junction with Route 2 in New Haven. The highway continued east to Old Saybrook, where it met the southern terminus of Route 10 and crossed the Connecticut River. Route 1 met the southern ends of Route 12 and Route 32 in New London and Groton, respectively. The highway intersected the eastern end of Route 17 in Stonington, Connecticut, immediately before entering Westerly, Rhode Island.

Route 1 immediately intersected the southern end of Route 1A on entering Rhode Island. Route 1A followed a shorter, more inland route between Westerly and Providence. Route 1 paralleled the Block Island Sound coast to Narragansett, where the highway turned north along Narragansett Bay toward Warwick and Providence. In the state capital, Route 1 collected the other end of Route 1A and intersected Route 3. The highway passed through Pawtucket and entered Massachusetts. Route 1 went straight toward Boston, where the route met the eastern ends of Route 5 and Route 7 and intersected the north–south Route 6 and Route 28. The highway left Boston for the North Shore of Massachusetts, then passed through the Seacoast Region of New Hampshire to Portsmouth. Route 1A in New Hampshire followed the shore from Seabrook to Portsmouth where the route met the southern end of Route 16.

Route 1 continued along the southern Maine coast, where the highway had junctions with Route 9 and Route 11 in Wells and Biddeford, respectively. The highway met three route termini in Portland: Route 18, Route 25, and Route 26. Route 1 continued northeast to Brunswick, where the highway intersected the eastern and southern ends of Route 19 and Route 20, respectively. The route continued through the Down East cities of Belfast and Ellsworth before turning north to its terminus in Calais, where the highway met the southern end of Route 24 before entering New Brunswick.

The general course of Route 1 is today followed by U.S. Route 1, which served as the main highway of the Atlantic coast of not just New England but the United States until it was eclipsed by Interstate 95. Route 1A in Rhode Island was replaced with Rhode Island Route 3, and in New Hampshire was replaced with New Hampshire Route 1A.

=== Route 2 ===
New England Route 2
- Location: New Haven, CT–Derby, VT

Route 2, or the Connecticut River Way, began at Route 1 in New Haven, Connecticut. The highway headed north through Meriden and entered the Connecticut River valley south of Hartford, where the highway joined Route 3 and Route 17 to cross the Bulkeley Bridge to the east side of the river. Route 2 followed the east side of the river from East Hartford into the Pioneer Valley of Massachusetts. At Springfield, the highway joined Route 5 on the Memorial Bridge to return to the west side of the river. Route 2 headed north through Holyoke to Northampton, where the highway was joined by Route 10. The two New England routes intersected Route 7 at Greenfield before diverging at Bernardston, where Route 10 crossed the river to serve New Hampshire and Route 2 continued along the west side of the river into Vermont.

Route 2 briefly ran concurrently with Route 9 through Brattleboro. The highway passed through Bellows Falls and intersected Route 11 in Springfield. At Weathersfield, Route 2 was joined by Route 12, which came across the river from Claremont, New Hampshire. The two highways diverged at Hartland, then Route 2 continued into White River Junction and its junctions with Route 13 and Route 14, which crossed the river together into Lebanon, New Hampshire. The highway intersected Route 25A in Bradford and Route 25 in Wells River. Route 2 left the Connecticut River at Barnet and intersected Route 15 and Route 18 in St. Johnsbury. At West Burke, Route 2 continued northwest while Route 2A continued north. Route 2 was joined by Route 12 again at Barton. The two highways passed through Orleans and received the northern end of Route 12B at Coventry before Route 12 ended at Newport. Route 2 headed east to receive the northern end of Route 2A at Derby before reaching the Canadian border, where the road entered Quebec.

The general course of Route 2 is today followed by U.S. Route 5, the main route through the Connecticut River valley until it was succeeded by Interstate 91. Route 2A was replaced with Vermont Route 5A.

=== Route 3 ===
New England Route 3
- Location: Danbury, CT–Provincetown, MA

Route 3, or the New York, Hartford, Providence, and Cape Cod Route, began at the New York state line in Ridgefield, Connecticut. The highway headed east through Newtown to Waterbury. Route 3 joined Route 8 north from Waterbury to Thomaston, then headed east through Bristol and Plainville. The highway bypassed New Britain on its way to Hartford, where the highway intersected Route 10 and crossed the Connecticut River on the Bulkeley Bridge with Route 2 and Route 17. In East Hartford, Route 2 split to the north, Route 17 split to the southeast, and Route 3 continued east through Manchester to Willimantic, where it met Route 32. The highway continued through Danielson, the site of its junction with Route 12, before entering Rhode Island.

Route 3 crossed northern Rhode Island to Providence, where the highway intersected Route 1. The highway entered Massachusetts and served the South Coast cities of Fall River and New Bedford. Route 3 met the southern end of Route 28 at Wareham and in Bourne met a connector road to Route 6 at Sagamore. Route 3 headed south from Bourne to Falmouth, then headed east along the Nantucket Sound shore of Cape Cod through Hyannis. The highway turned north at Chatham and met the eastern end of Route 6 in Orleans. Route 3 continued north and then west along the narrowing cape to its terminus in Provincetown.

The general course of Route 3 was replaced by U.S. Route 6, except from New York to Ridgefield by Connecticut Route 35, from Southbury to Farmington by local roads and Connecticut Route 10, and from Bourne to Orleans, which is today part of Massachusetts Route 28. The Danbury–East Hartford portion of the highway was further superseded by Interstate 84, and the Providence–Wareham portion was replaced by Interstate 195.

=== Route 4 ===
New England Route 4
- Location: Sharon, CT–Highgate Springs, VT

Route 4, or the New York, Berkshire, and Burlington Way, began at the New York state line in Sharon, Connecticut. The highway continued south along the eastern edge of New York to New York City. Route 4 headed northeast through Salisbury to North Canaan, where the highway met Route 17. The two highways headed north to Great Barrington, Massachusetts, where Route 17 split east. Route 4 continued north through the Berkshire Hills, where the highway ran concurrently with Route 5 from Lenox to Pittsfield and with Route 7 through Williamstown. Route 4 continued north along the western side of Vermont, intersecting Route 9 in Bennington, Route 11 in Manchester, and Route 13 in Rutland. The highway began a long concurrency with Route 30 in Middlebury. Route 4 and Route 30 met the northern end of Route 30A in Vergennes, then the highways followed the eastern side of Lake Champlain to Burlington, where they met the western end of Route 14. Route 4 and Route 30 met the western end of Route 15 in Winooski before Route 30 split west at Colchester to serve Grand Isle. Route 4 continued north through St. Albans to the Canadian border at Highgate Springs, where the road entered Quebec.

Route 4 followed the general course of what is now U.S. Route 7 from North Canaan to Highgate Springs. The highway was further superseded by Interstate 89 from Burlington to Canada. South of North Canaan, the highway followed what is now U.S. Route 44 to Salisbury, Connecticut Route 41 to Sharon, and Connecticut Route 343 and New York State Route 343 to Amenia, New York. From there, the highway, which in New York was not officially part of the New England road marking system, followed what is today New York State Route 22 to New York City.

=== Route 5 ===
New England Route 5
- Location: Pittsfield, MA–Boston, MA

Route 5, known as the Hubway, began at the New York state line in Pittsfield, Massachusetts. The highway headed east to the center of Pittsfield, then joined Route 4 south to Lenox. As Route 5 crossed the Berkshire Hills, it briefly ran concurrently with Route 8 in West Becket. The highway intersected Route 10 in Westfield and joined Route 2 to cross the Connecticut River on the Memorial Bridge into Springfield. Route 5 continued east through Palmer, where the highway was joined briefly by Route 32, then headed northeast through Warren, Brookfield, and Spencer to Worcester, where the highway intersected Route 12. The highway continued east through Marlboro and Weston and entered Boston, where Route 5 had connections with Route 28, Route 7, Route 6, and Route 1.

Route 5 was replaced by U.S. Route 20 for most of its length. However, between Palmer and Shrewsbury, the highway followed the corridors of what are now Massachusetts Route 67 and Massachusetts Route 9. Route 5 was further superseded along its entire length by the Massachusetts Turnpike.

=== Route 6 ===
New England Route 6
- Location: Orleans, MA–Colebrook, NH

Route 6, which was referred to as the Cape Cod White Mountains Way, began at a junction with Route 3 in Orleans, Massachusetts, on Cape Cod. The highway headed west along the Cape Cod Bay shore of the peninsula, passing through Dennis on its way to Sagamore, where the route had a connector road to Route 3 in Bourne. Route 6 continued northwest through what are now the South Shore suburbs of Boston. The main highway passed through Plymouth, Kingston, Weymouth, and Quincy. An alternate route, Route 6A, passed closer to the Massachusetts Bay coast between Plymouth and Quincy, serving Duxbury and Cohasset. Route 6 continued into Boston, where the highway intersected Route 1 and Route 28 and met the eastern end of Route 7. The highway headed northwest from Boston to Lowell, where the highway followed the Merrimack River into New Hampshire.

Route 6 passed through New Hampshire's three largest cities, Nashua, Manchester, and the state capital of Concord. The highway ran concurrently with Route 28 between Manchester and Suncook, and the highway intersected Route 9 in Concord. At Franklin, Route 6 met the eastern end of Route 14 and joined with Route 11 to leave the Merrimack valley and pass through the heart of the Lakes Region. The two routes diverged north of Laconia, and as Route 6 returned to the Pemigewasset River valley, it ran concurrently with Route 25 from Meredith to Plymouth. Route 6A provided a more direct alternate route from Franklin to Plymouth via Bristol. Route 6 continued through the White Mountains, which the route summitted at Franconia Notch. The highway intersected Route 18 at Twin Mountain and Route 15 at Lancaster, then reached its end at a joint terminus with Route 26 in Colebrook.

Route 6 followed the general course of what is now U.S. Route 6 from Orleans to Sagamore and Massachusetts Route 3 from Sagamore to Boston. The highway was replaced by U.S. Route 3 from Boston to its northern terminus. Route 6A in Massachusetts is now Massachusetts Route 3A, and Route 6A in New Hampshire is now New Hampshire Route 3A.

=== Route 7 ===
New England Route 7
- Location: Williamstown, MA–Boston, MA

Route 7, or the Mohawk Trail, began at the New York state line in Hancock, Massachusetts. The highway started heading north from the state line and turned east in Williamstown, through which the highway joined Route 4. Route 7 intersected Route 8 in North Adams and crossed the Berkshire Hills. The highway emerged into the Pioneer Valley at Greenfield, where the highway intersected Route 2 and Route 10 and crossed the Connecticut River at the site of the General Pierce Bridge. East of the Connecticut River valley, Route 7 ran concurrently with Route 32 between Athol and Baldwinville and intersected Route 12 in Fitchburg. The highway continued southeast through Concord and Lexington and joined Route 6 entering Boston, where the highways had connections with Route 1 and Route 28.

Route 7 was superseded by Massachusetts Route 2 for almost all of its length. However, the highway followed Massachusetts Route 43 from its western terminus to Williamstown and ran south of the current route of Massachusetts Route 2 from Greenfield to Millers Falls.

=== Route 8 ===
New England Route 8
- Location: Stratford, CT–Wilmington, VT

Route 8, or the Stratford, Waterbury, and North Adams Route, began at Route 1 in Stratford, Connecticut. The highway paralleled the Housatonic River to Shelton, where the highway crossed the river into Derby and followed the Naugatuck River through Waterbury. Route 8 ran concurrently with Route 3 from Waterbury to Thomaston, then continued north through Torrington to Winsted, where the highway intersected Route 17. Route 8 continued through the Berkshire Hills through West Becket, where the highway briefly joined Route 5, and Dalton. The highway intersected Route 7 in North Adams, then crossed into Vermont and ended at Route 9 in Wilmington.

Route 8 was supplanted by Connecticut Route 8, Massachusetts Route 8, and Vermont Route 8, though by 1927, the route in Vermont was relocated along modern-day Route 100.

=== Route 9 ===
New England Route 9
- Location: Bennington, VT–Wells, ME

Route 9, named the Bennington Wells Route, began at the New York state line in Bennington, Vermont. The number continued west to Troy, New York, along what was briefly New York State Route 9. Route 9 intersected Route 4 in the center of Bennington and crossed the Green Mountains before meeting the northern end of Route 8 in Wilmington. The highway crossed Hogback Mountain then descended into the Connecticut River valley to Brattleboro. Route 9 briefly followed Route 2 through town before crossing the river into New Hampshire. The highway headed northeast through Keene, where it intersected Route 10 and Route 12. Route 9 ran concurrently with Route 32 between Hillsboro and Henniker before reaching the state capital of Concord, where it had a junction with Route 6. The highway continued through Epsom, the site of its intersection with Route 28, to Dover, where the route crossed Route 16. Route 9 crossed the Salmon Falls River into Maine at Berwick and reached its eastern terminus at Route 1 in Wells on the southern Maine coast.

Route 9 was replaced with Vermont Route 9, New Hampshire Route 9, and a small portion of Maine Route 9.

=== Route 10 ===
New England Route 10
- Location: Old Saybrook, CT–Littleton, NH

Route 10, designated the Central New England Route, began at Route 1 in Old Saybrook, Connecticut. The highway headed north along the west side of the Connecticut River through Middletown to Hartford. Within the state capital, Route 10 intersected Route 2 and Route 3 and joined Route 17 northwest to Avon. The highway turned north to pass through Granby and enter Massachusetts at Southwick. Route 10 continued north through Westfield, where it intersected Route 5, then veered northeast to Northampton. The highway ran concurrently with Route 2 through Greenfield, the site of its junction with Route 7 to Bernardston. Route 10 crossed to the east side of the Connecticut River at Northfield and headed north along the river into New Hampshire. Route 10 turned east at Hinsdale then north at Winchester to Keene, where the route intersected Route 9 and Route 12. The highway met Route 11 at Newport and joined Route 14 west through Lebanon to return to the Connecticut River valley. Route 10 followed the east side of the river through Orford to Haverhill. The highway joined Route 25 from there to Woodsville, then Route 10 split northeast to its terminus at Route 18 in Littleton.

The general course of Route 10 was later followed by Connecticut Route 9, U.S. Route 44, Connecticut Route 189, Connecticut Route 10, Massachusetts Route 10, New Hampshire Route 10, and U.S. Route 302. The directional turns between Northfield and Winchester are now part of Route 63 and New Hampshire Route 119. Small portions of the highway have been superseded further by Interstate 91 and Interstate 89.

=== Route 11 ===
New England Route 11
- Location: Manchester, VT–Biddeford, ME

Route 11, deemed the Manchester Biddeford Route, began at Route 4 in Manchester, Vermont. The highway crossed the Green Mountains and emerged into the Connecticut River valley at Springfield, where the highway intersected Route 2. Route 11 crossed the river to Charlestown, New Hampshire, where the highway met Route 12. The two highways headed north along the east side of the Connecticut River to Claremont, where Route 12 split west to cross the river and Route 11 headed east to Newport, where the route intersected Route 10. Route 11 met the northern end of Route 32 in Sunapee, where the highway curved north around Lake Sunapee. The highway was joined by Route 14 in Andover; the two highways headed east to Route 14's eastern terminus in Franklin. At that junction, Route 6A headed north along the Pemigewasset River valley while Route 6 and Route 11 headed east into the Lakes Region. North of Laconia, Route 11 split from Route 6 and followed the southern shore of Lake Winnipesaukee to Alton, where the highway intersected Route 28. The highway continued southeast to Rochester, where the highway intersected Route 16 and crossed the Salmon Falls River into Maine. Route 11 passed through Sanford and Alfred on its journey to its eastern terminus at Route 1 in Biddeford.

Route 11 was succeeded by Vermont Route 11, New Hampshire Route 11, a small piece of Maine State Route 11 from the state line to Alfred, and Maine State Route 111 from Alfred to Biddeford.

=== Route 12 ===
New England Route 12
- Location: New London, CT–Newport, VT

Route 12, which was named the Keene Way, began at Route 1 in New London, Connecticut. The highway followed the west side of the Thames River to Norwich, where the route intersected Route 17 and Route 32. Route 12 continued through the Quinebaug River valley and intersected Route 3 at Danielson before entering Massachusetts. In that state, the highway intersected Route 5 in Worcester and passed through Leominster. Route 12 veered northwest after meeting Route 7 in Fitchburg and passed through Winchendon before entering New Hampshire. The highway passed through Keene, where it intersected Route 9 and Route 10, and reached the Connecticut River valley at Walpole.

Route 12 followed the east side of the river north through Charlestown, where Route 11 joined its course, to Claremont, after which the route headed west into Weathersfield, Vermont. The highway ran concurrently with Route 2 north to Hartland and briefly joined Route 13 on its way to Woodstock. Route 12 continued north to Bethel, where the route joined Route 14 to the state capital of Montpelier. Between Randolph and Northfield, Route 12A formed a western loop that served Braintree and Roxbury. The highway briefly followed Route 18 out of the capital before splitting north to Hardwick, where the route briefly ran with Route 15. Route 12B split from the mainline at Hardwick while Route 12 followed a more easterly path to Barton, where Route 12 began to share road with Route 2. Route 12B met up with Route 2 and Route 12 at Coventry before Route 12 reached its northern terminus at Newport, from which Route 2 continued north toward Quebec.

Route 12 was replaced by Connecticut Route 32 from New London to Norwich, Connecticut Route 12 north of Norwich, Massachusetts Route 12, New Hampshire Route 12, and Vermont Route 12 from the Connecticut River to Montpelier. North of Montpelier, Route 12 was replaced with Vermont Route 14 to Hardwick, Vermont Route 16 to Barton, and U.S. Route 5 to Newport. Route 12A is now Vermont Route 12A, and Route 12B was succeeded by Vermont Route 14. Route 12 was further functionally replaced in various sections by Connecticut's Interstate 395, Interstate 190 and Interstate 290 in Massachusetts, and Interstate 91 and Interstate 89 in Vermont.

=== Route 13 ===
New England Route 13
- Location: Fair Haven, VT–White River Junction, VT

Route 13, also known as the Whitehall White River Junction Way, began at the New York state line in Fair Haven, Vermont, east of Whitehall, New York. In the center of Fair Haven, the highway intersected Route 30, with which the highway headed east, and the southern end of Route 30A. Route 13 and Route 30 ran concurrently to Castleton, then Route 13 continued to Rutland, where the highway intersected Route 4. The highway crossed the Green Mountains between Rutland and Bridgewater. Route 13 continued through Woodstock, east of which the highway briefly joined Route 12, to its eastern terminus at Route 2 in White River Junction.

Route 13's corridor was taken over by U.S. Route 4.

=== Route 14 ===
New England Route 14
- Location: Burlington, VT–Franklin, NH

Route 14, known as the Burlington Franklin Way, began at Route 4 and Route 30 in Burlington, Vermont. The highway paralleled the Winooski River through the Green Mountains to Montpelier. In the state capital, Route 14 joined Route 12 and the beginning of Route 18. The latter two routes split northeast while Route 14 headed southeast through Barre, where Route 25 split to the east. Route 14 headed south through Royalton and southeast to White River Junction, where the highway intersected Route 2. The highway crossed the Connecticut River to Lebanon, New Hampshire, through which the highway ran concurrently with Route 10. The route headed southeast through Canaan and Danbury to Andover. Route 14 joined Route 11 east from Andover to the former route's eastern terminus in Franklin at Route 6 and Route 6A.

Route 14 was superseded by U.S. Route 2, Vermont Route 14, and U.S. Route 4. The former two highways were themselves superseded by Interstate 89.

=== Route 15 ===
New England Route 15
- Location: Winooski, VT–Houlton, ME

Route 15, deemed the Burlington Bangor Way, began not in Burlington but just to the north at Route 4 and Route 30 in Winooski. The highway headed northeast through Cambridge and followed the Lamoille River through the Green Mountains and through Morrisville. Route 15 intersected the southern end of Route 12A and briefly ran concurrently with Route 12 in Hardwick. The highway joined Route 18 in Danville; the two highways passed through St. Johnsbury, where they intersected Route 2, before diverging. Route 15 continued northeast through Lunenburg before crossing the Connecticut River into Lancaster, New Hampshire, where the route intersected Route 6. The highway headed southeast through the White Mountains to Gorham, where the highway intersected Route 16 and followed the Androscoggin River into Maine.

Route 15 joined with Route 26 between Bethel and Newry and left the valley of the Androscoggin River at Dixfield. The highway continued through Farmington and entered the Kennebec River valley at Norridgewock, where the route joined Route 20 to Skowhegan. Route 15 passed through Pittsfield and Newport before reaching Bangor, where the highway connected with Route 1. While Route 1 headed back Down East in both directions, Route 15 headed north through the Penobscot River valley through Milford and Enfield. The highway left the Penobscot valley at Mattawamkeag and curved northeast through Island Falls. Route 15 passed through Houlton, where the highway intersected Route 24, before entering New Brunswick.

Route 15 was replaced by Vermont Route 15 and U.S. Route 2. The highway was further superseded by Interstate 95 between Bangor and Houlton.

=== Route 16 ===
New England Route 16
- Location: Portsmouth, NH–Errol, NH

Route 16, or the East Side Road, began at Route 1 in Portsmouth, New Hampshire. The highway headed north on the west side of the Piscataqua River and Salmon Falls River and intersected Route 9 in Dover and Route 11 in Rochester. Route 16 passed through the eastern side of the Lakes Region, within which the route received the northern end of Route 28 at Ossipee and joined with Route 25. The highway ran concurrently with Route 18 from Conway to Glen, then crossed the White Mountains at Pinkham Notch on the east side of Mount Washington. Route 16 intersected Route 15 in Gorham and passed through Berlin before reaching its northern terminus at Route 26 at Errol.

Route 16 was superseded by New Hampshire Route 16.

=== Route 17 ===
New England Route 17
- Location: Egremont, MA–Stonington, CT

Route 17, or the Westerly Route, began at the New York state line in Egremont, Massachusetts. The highway headed east to Great Barrington, then followed Route 4 south into Connecticut. At North Canaan, Route 17 split from Route 4 and headed southeast through Winsted and Canton into Hartford. The highway joined Route 2 and Route 3 to cross the Connecticut River on the Bulkeley Bridge. In East Hartford, Route 17 split southeast from Route 3 through Marlborough and Colchester. The highway briefly ran concurrently with Route 32 through Norwich, where the highways intersected Route 12. Route 17 continued southeast from Norwich to its eastern terminus at Route 1 in Stonington, Connecticut, just west of Westerly, Rhode Island.

Route 17 was replaced by Massachusetts Route 23, U.S. Route 7, U.S. Route 44, and Connecticut Route 2.

=== Route 18 ===
New England Route 18
- Location: Montpelier, VT–Portland, ME

Route 18, designated the Crawford Notch Way, began at Route 12 and Route 14 in Montpelier, Vermont. The three highways passed through the state capital, then Route 14 split southeast toward Barre and Route 12 split north for Hardwick. Route 18 headed northeast and joined Route 15 at Danville to run through St. Johnsbury, where the highways intersected Route 2. East of town, Route 18 split southeast to cross the Connecticut River into New Hampshire at Waterford. The highway met the northern end of Route 10 at Littleton and intersected Route 6 in Twin Mountain. Route 18 crossed the White Mountains by way of Crawford Notch, then followed the Saco River to Conway, north of which the highway ran concurrently with Route 16 and Route 28 The highway followed the river into Maine with Route 28 which terminated at the state line, then passed through Bridgton and Naples before reaching its eastern terminus at Route 1 in Portland.

Route 18 was superseded by U.S. Route 2, Vermont Route 18, New Hampshire Route 18, and U.S. Route 302.

=== Route 20 ===
New England Route 20
- Location: Brunswick, ME–Jackman, ME

Route 20, named the Portland Quebec Highway, began not in Portland but at Route 1 in Brunswick, Maine. The highway headed north to Gardiner, where the highway began to follow the Kennebec River. Route 20 continued through Augusta and Waterville to Skowhegan. The highway joined Route 15 west to Norridgewock, then turned north again to follow the Kennebec River toward Quebec. Route 20 left the river north of Caratunk and reached its northern end at the Canadian border north of Jackman, beyond which the road continued toward Quebec City.

Route 20 was replaced by U.S. Route 201.

=== Route 24 ===
New England Route 24
- Location: Calais, ME–Madawaska, ME

Route 24 was originally intended to connect Brunswick and Greenville, Maine, but instead it began in Calais where Route 1 crossed into New Brunswick. The highway headed west along the St. Croix River through Princeton. Route 24 continued north through Topsfield and Danforth to Houlton, where the highway intersected Route 15. The highway continued through the Aroostook County towns of Mars Hill, Presque Isle, and Caribou. Route 24 began paralleling the St. John River at Van Buren. The highway followed the river northwest through Grand Isle to Madawaska, where the highway terminated at its crossing of the river into Edmundston, New Brunswick.

Route 24 is now wholly part of U.S. Route 1.

=== Route 25 ===
New England Route 25
- Location: Barre, VT–Portland, ME

Route 25, or the Montpelier Portland Route, began not in the state capital of Vermont but to the east at Route 14 in Barre. The highway's alternate route, Route 25A, split southeast from the main route in Orange. The main route continued east to Wells River, where the highway intersected Route 2 and crossed the Connecticut River. From Woodsville, New Hampshire, the highway ran concurrently south with Route 10 to Haverhill. Route 25A intersected Route 2 in Bradford, Vermont, and crossed the river into Piermont, New Hampshire, then joined Route 10 north to reconnect with its parent at Haverhill. Route 25 headed southeast through Warren to Plymouth, joining Route 6A for its last few miles to reconnect with the latter route's parent, Route 6. Route 25 joined Route 6 through the Lakes Region to Meredith, where Route 25 headed northeast to the north of Lake Winnipesaukee to Ossipee. There, the highway briefly joined Route 16 before striking out east into Maine. Route 25 headed through Cornish, Standish, and Westbrook on its way to its eastern terminus at Route 1 in Portland.

Route 25 was replaced by U.S. Route 302, most of New Hampshire Route 25, and Maine State Route 25. Route 25A was replaced by Vermont Route 25 and a little bit of New Hampshire Route 25.

=== Route 26 ===
New England Route 26
- Location: Portland, ME–Colebrook, NH

Route 26, also known as the Dixville Notch way, began at Route 1 in Portland, Maine. The highway headed north through Gray, Poland, and Norway. Route 26 curved west to Bethel, where the highway joined Route 15 along the Androscoggin River to Newry. The highway continued northwest into New Hampshire, where the highway met the northern end of Route 16 at Errol. Route 26 crossed the White Mountains at Dixville Notch before reaching its northern end at Route 6 at Colebrook on the Connecticut River.

Route 26 was superseded by Maine State Route 26 and New Hampshire Route 26.

=== Route 28 ===
New England Route 28
- Location: Wareham, MA–Conway, NH

Route 28 began at Route 3 along Buzzards Bay in Wareham, Massachusetts. The highway headed north through the interior of southeastern Massachusetts via Middleborough and Brockton. In Boston, Route 28 had connections with Route 1, Route 5, Route 6, and Route 7. The highway passed through Reading and crossed the Merrimack River at Lawrence before entering New Hampshire. Route 28 passed through Derry before reaching Manchester, from which the highway ran concurrently with Route 6 to Suncook. The highway intersected Route 9 at Epsom and Route 11 in Alton and passed along the east side of Lake Winnipesaukee before reaching Route 16 in Ossipee, following it through Tamworth, Albany and Conway before intersecting with Route 18 and running concurrently with it to the state line with Maine near Fryeburg where it terminated.

Route 28 was replaced by most of Massachusetts Route 28 and New Hampshire Route 28.

=== Route 30 ===
New England Route 30
- Location: Poultney, VT–Alburgh, VT

Route 30, also known as the Vergennes Fair Haven Route, began at the New York state line in Poultney, Vermont. The highway headed north along the east side of the Poultney River to Route 13 at Fair Haven. From there, the highway's alternate route, Route 30A, continued north from the town through Orwell and Addison while Route 30 joined Route 13 in a concurrency east to Castleton, where the highway turned north through Sudbury and Cornwall to Middlebury. There, Route 30 ran concurrently with Route 4 to Vergennes, where Route 30A rejoined the main route. Route 30 and Route 4 continued north along the east side of Lake Champlain to Burlington and Winooski, in which the highways met the western ends of Route 14 and Route 15, respectively. Near Colchester, Route 30 split northwest from Route 4 and ran the length of Grand Isle County. At Alburgh, Route 30 continued north to its end at the Canadian border while a spur, Route 30B, headed west toward Rouses Point, New York.

Route 30 was mostly replaced by local roads between Poultney and Fair Haven, then U.S. Route 4, Vermont Route 30, U.S. Route 7, U.S. Route 2, and Vermont Route 225. Route 30A was superseded by Vermont Route 22A, and Route 30B was taken over by U.S. Route 2.

=== Route 32 ===
New England Route 32
- Location: Groton, CT–Sunapee, NH

Route 32, or the Lake Sunapee Route, began at Route 1 in Groton, Connecticut. The highway followed the east side of the Thames River to Norwich, where the highway intersected Route 12 and Route 17. Route 32 continued north through Willimantic, where the route had a junction with Route 3, and left Connecticut after passing through Stafford Springs. The highway continued to Palmer, Massachusetts, the site of its junction with Route 5. Route 32 continued northeast through Ware and Barre, then northwest through Petersham to Athol. The highway joined Route 7 east to Baldwinville, then headed northeast through Winchendon, where the highway intersected Route 12 again, into New Hampshire. Route 32 headed through Peterborough to Hillsborough, where the highway met Route 9. The two highways ran concurrently to Henniker, then Route 32 split northwest to Newbury, from which the highway followed the west side of Lake Sunapee to its terminus at Route 11 at Sunapee.

Route 32 was superseded by Connecticut Route 12, Connecticut Route 32, Massachusetts Route 32, U.S. Route 202, New Hampshire Route 114, New Hampshire Route 103, and New Hampshire Route 103B.

== State routes ==
=== Connecticut ===
Primary routes
Route	From	Through	To	Modern designation	Notes
101	South Chaplin	Chaplin - Phoenixville - Pomfret - Putnam	East Putnam	Route 198, US 44	
102	New London		Colchester	Route 85	
103	Central Village		Rhode Island line at Sterling	Route 14	
104	Portland		Glastonbury	Route 17	
105	Enfield		Stafford Springs	Route 190	1930: Extended to Massachusetts state line at Union, absorbing the first iteration of Route 149 (now Route 190, Route 171)
106	Clinton		Higganum	Route 81	
107	Talcottville	Rockville	Ashford	Route 74	
108	Manchester	Rockville	Massachusetts line at Somers	New State Road, Tolland Turnpike, Route 83	
109	Coventry		Eastford	U.S. 44	
110	Hartford	Windsor	Suffield	Route 159, Route 75, Mapleton Ave	1929: Realigned to follow entirety of modern Route 159
111	Milldale	Meriden - Middletown	Marlborough	Route 322, Route 66	1926: Extended to Windham
112	Middletown	Durham	Guilford	Route 17, Route 77	
113	Thomaston	Plainville - New Britain	Hartford	Route 372, SR 555, Route 71, Route 173, SR 529, New Britain Ave	1926: Truncated from Thomaston to Plainville
114	Durham		New Haven	Route 17	
115	Weatogue		West Hartford	Route 185	
116	Farmington	Avon	Granby	Route 10	
117	Sandy Hook	Derby	New Haven	Route 34	
118	New Haven		Milldale	Route 10	
119	Danbury		New York line at Danbury	U.S. 6	1926: Taken over by U.S. 6
120	Naugatuck		New Haven	Route 63	
121	North Canaan	Lakeville	New York line at North Canaan	U.S. 44	
122	Bridgeport	Stepney	Newtown	Route 111, Route 25	
123	Cornwall Bridge	Torrington	Canton	Route 4, U.S. 202	
124	Bridgeport		Danbury	Route 58, Route 302, Route 53	
125	New Milford	Roxbury	Southbury	Route 67	
126	Norwalk		Ridgefield	U.S. 7	
127	Bull's Bridge		New York line at Sherman	Bulls Bridge Road	
128	Danbury	New Milford - Litchfield	Torrington	U.S. 202	1930: Truncated from Danbury to New Milford
129	Gaylordsville		New York line at Sherman	Route 55	
130	Goshen		Middlebury		A 1929 map indicates usage of modern Route 61 from Morris to Neufa
131	New Milford	Sherman	New York line at Sherman	Route 37, Chimney Hill Road, Briggs Hill Road	
132	Cornwall		South Canaan	Route 43, Route 63	
133	Winsted	Hartland	Granby	Route 20	
134	New Milford	Kent	Canaan	U.S. 7	1929: Removed due to realignment of U.S. 7 rerouting through Connecticut
135	North Branford		Branford	Route 22	
136	Gaylordsville		Danbury	Route 55, Route 39	
137	Pomfret Center		Killingly Center	Route 101	
138	Farmington		Collinsville	Route 4, Route 179	
139	Dayville		Rhode Island line at East Killingly	Route 101	
140	North Branford		North Guilford	Route 80	
141	Willimantic		Plainfield	Route 14, Route 14A	
142	Putnam District		Massachusetts line at Woodstock	Route 171, Route 169	
143	New York line at Ridgefield		Ridgefield	Route 116	
144	Brooklyn		Wauregan	Route 205	
145	New Milford		Shelton		Route followed old Housatonic Turnpike; road flooded by creation of Lakes Lillinonah and Zoar
146	Willimantic	Mansfield Center	Union	Route 195, Route 89	
147	Woodbridge	Seymour - Oxford	Southbury	Route 67	
148	East Haddam	Moodus	Amston	Route 149	
149	Stafford Springs		Massachusetts line at Union	Route 190, Route 171	1930: Absorbed by Route 105
149	Cornwall Bridge		Sharon	Route 4	Designated 1930
150	East Haddam		Old Lyme	Route 156	
151	Willington	Westford - North Ashford - North Woodstock	Massachusetts line at Quinebaug	Village Hill Road, I-84, Turnpike Road, Boston Hollow Road, Centre Pike, Old Turnpike Road, Route 197	
152	New Preston	Warren	Cornwall Bridge	Route 45	
153	Eagle Landing	Hadlyme	Norwich	Route 82	
154	Woodbury	Washington	New Preston	Route 47	1931: Extended south to include Middle Rd Tpke, White Deer Rock Rd, and Charcoal Ave
155	New Preston		Bull's Bridge	New Preston Hill Road, Cherniske Road, Barker Road, W Meetinghouse Road, Camps Flat Road, Bulls Bridge Road	
156	Hawleyville		Brookfield	Route 25	
157	Terryville		Farmington	U.S. 6	
158	Redding		Newtown	Hopewell Woods Road, Hopewell Road, Poverty Hollow Road, Key Rock Road	
159	Washington Depot		New Milford	Route 109	
160	Unionville		Plainville	Route 177	
161	Newtown		Bethel	Route 302	
162	Berlin		New Britain	Farmington Ave, Route 372, Route 71	
163	Torrington		Burlington town line	Route 4	
164	Manchester		South Glastonbury	Route 83	
165	Glastonbury		Buckingham	Route 94	
166	West Stafford		Tolland	Route 30	
167	Cobalt		Moodus	Route 151	
168	Andover		Yantic	Route 87	Also possibly used for modern Route 4 from modern Route 69 to Torrington
169	Hadlyme		Durham	Route 148	
170	Norwich		Montville	New London Turnpike	
171	The Center		Branford	Route 142	
172	Waterbury		Bristol	Route 69	
173	Shelton		Monroe	Route 110	
174	Winsted		Colebrook	Route 183	Possible extension from Colebrook along Route 183 to U.S. 44; in one map, former portion signed Route 314
175	North Guilford		Deep River Center	Route 80	
176	Westport		Wilton	Rooute 33	
177	East Hampton		Colchester	Route 16	
178	Meriden		New Britain	Route 71	
179	Poquetanuck		Preston	Route 2A	
180	Bethel		Redding	Route 58, Route 107	
181	Talcottville		Tolland	Route 30	
182	Brookfield Center		Bridgewater	Route 133	
183	Eastford	Woodstock	Putnam District	Route 198, Route 171	
184	Norwalk		New Canaan	Route 123	
185	Mechanicsville		Grosvenordale	Route 193, Route 200	
186	New Haven		Wallingford	State Street, Hartford Turnpike	
186	Bethel				Near Route 58; Included in 1930 map in addition to above definition
187	Norwich		Taftville	Route 169	
188	Niantic		Chesterfield	Route 161	
190	Durham		Madison Center	Route 79	
193	Easton			Center Street	
194	New Fairfield Center		Sawmill Center	Route 39	
195	Milford		Derby	Route 121	
196	Washington		Roxbury	Route 199	
198	Roxbury		Roxbury Falls	South Street	Both designations used in the same
198				Litchfield Turnpike	Both designations used in the same
199	Middlefield		Middletown	Route 157	
200	Seymour		Ansonia	Route 115	
202	Terryville		Harwinton	Route 72	
204	East Hartland		New Hartford	N/A, Reservoir Road	Flooded by construction of Saville Dam from 1927 to 1948
206	Granby		Massachusetts line at North Granby	Route 189	
208	Melrose		Scitico	Route 191	
210	Storrs		Mansfield Center	Route 195	
214	Willimantic		Lebanon	Route 289	
216	Stonington	Voluntown	Sterling Hill	Route 49	
220	Redding			Cross Highway	
222	South Windham		North Windham	Route 203	
224	Durham		Rockfall	Cherry Hill Road	
226	Wallingford			Center St, E Center St, Northford Road, Woods Hill Road	
299	Woodville		Warren	Route 341	

Secondary highways
Route	From	Through	To	Modern designation	Notes
300	New York line at Stamford		Ridgeway-Bulls Head	Route 104	
301	Falls Village		Lakeville	Route 112	A 1929 map indicates that the number was assigned to modern Route 182, conflicting with earlier maps indicating it was Route 174; could be a typo
302	Darien		New York line at New Canaan	Route 124	
303	Suffield		Thompsonville	Thompsonville Road, Main Street	The Suffield and Thompsonville Bridge carried the route over the Connecticut River; was demolished in 1971
304	Wilton		Ridgefield	Route 33	
305	Simsbury		Tariffville	Route 315	Also seen in 1930 map for Route 136
306	Bridgeport		Easton	Route 59, Sport Hill Road, Silver Hill Road	
307	East Windsor		Ellington	Route 140	
308	Trumbull		Monroe	Route 111	
309	West Cornwall		Cornwall	Route 128	
310	Bantam	Lakeside	Morris	Route 209, Route 109	
311	Hartford		Bloomfield	Blue Hills Ave, Park Ave, Mountain Ave, West Street	
312	Torrington		Norfolk	Route 272	
313	South Windsor		Manchester	Route 30	
314	Winsted		Massachusetts line at Colebrook	Route 183	
315	Coventry		Perkins Corner	SR 31	
316	Bridgeport		Shelton	Noble Ave, Huntington Turnpike, SR 8, Bridgeport Ave, Center St	
317	East Hartford		Manchester	Silver Lane, Roberts Road	
318	Stamford		New York line at Stamford	SR 137	
319	Berlin		Cromwell	SR 372, New Lane	
320	Plainville		Canton	SR 177	
321	Baltic		Rhode Island line at Voluntown	SR 138	Actual length ambiguous
322	Orange			SR 152	
323	Cheshire Village		Waterbury	SR 70, East Main Street	
324	West New Haven		Savin Rock, West Haven	SR 122	
325	Cheshire		Naugatuck	SR 68	1930: Possible extension along SR 70 to Meriden
326	Southington			SR 120	
327	Colebrook		Norfolk	SR 182A, SR 182	
328	Bloomfield	Suffield	Suffield Depot	SR 187, SR 168	
329	Ridgefield		Branchville	SR 102	
330	Middlefield		Durham	SR 147	
331	Groton		Stonington	SR 184, SR 201	
332	Westbrook Center		Essex	SR 153	
333	Old Lyme		Central Waterford	SR 156	
334	Stafford Springs		Massachusetts line at Stafford Springs	SR 32	
335	Norwalk		Southport	SR 136, Compo Road South, Hillspoint Road, Green Farms Road, Beachside Ave, Pequot Ave	
336	Mechanicsville		Massachusetts line at Thompson	SR 193	
337	Milford		New Haven	SR 162, Main Street	
338	Old Saybrook		Saybrook Manor	SR 154	
339	Waterbury		Watertown	SR 73	
340	Fort Trumbull		Long Island Sound	SR 213, Ocean Ave	
341	Union City		Middlebury	SR 63, SR 188	
342	Mystic		Long Island Sound	SR 215	
343	Windsor Locks		East Granby	Spring Street, Nicholson Road, School Street	Much of the road removed to build Bradley Intl Airport
344	Mystic		Old Mystic	SR 27	
345	Taftville		Pomfret	SR 97	
346	Middletown		Cromwell	SR 3	
348	Naugatuck	Prospect	Waterbury	Clark Road, Straitsville Road, SR 69	
350	Watertown		Thomaston	U.S. 6	
354	Lebanon		Baltic	SR 207	Possible extension along SR 97 to Norwich
356	Taftville		Jewett City	SR 169, SR 138	
358	Greenwich		New York line at Greenwich	North Street	
360	Sharon		Amenia Union	SR 41	
362	Windsor		Suffield	SR 75, Mapleton Ave	Replaced SR 110
364	Oakdale		Uncasville	SR 163	
366	Manchester		Colchester	SR 534, SR 85	
368	Shelton		Stratford	SR 108	

=== Maine ===
Maine adopted the system three years after its inception, replacing the existing lettered routes and auto trails. The state began to add two and one digit routes in 1931; a full renumbering in 1933 effectively ended Maine's involvement in the system.

Route	From	Through	To	Lettered Highway	Renumbered To (1933)	Modern Designation	Notes
100	Gray	Auburn, Lewiston, Greene, Winthrop, Augusta, Belgrade, Oakland, Waterville, Fairfield	Pittsfield	E, G, H	SR 3, SR 11, SR 27, SR 7, SR 16, SR 155, SR 11, SR 188	U.S. 202, SR 104, Old Belgrade Road, SR 27, SR 11, SR 137, Spring St, Bridge St, Clinton Ave, SR 100	1931: Extended through Newport, Dover, Foxcroft, Milo, LaGrange, Howland, Saponac to Grand Falls Plantation, replacing ME 104, ME 154, ME 172
101	Augusta	Chelsea, Whitefield, Windsor, Jefferson, Somerville, Washington, Union, Hope, Rockport	Rockland	P	SR 17	SR 17, SR 90	
102	Augusta	Vassalboro, China, Palermo, Liberty, Montville, Searsmont, Morrill, Waldo	Belfast	R	SR 3	US 202, SR 3	1931: Extended through Stockton Springs and Ellsworth to Bar Harbor, co-signed with U.S. 1 and replacing ME 174, ME 183
103	Berwick	Eliot	Kittery		Intact	SR 236, SR 103	
104	Newport	Corinna, Dexter, Dover, Foxcroft, Guilford, Abbot, Monson, Shirley	Greenville Junction	J	SR 7, SR 15, SR 16		1931: Absorbed by ME 100 and ME 105
105	Bangor	Glenburn, Kenduskeag, Corinth, Charleston, Garland, Hermon	Dover	X	SR 15		1931: Extended through Guilford, Abbot, Monson, and Shirley to Greenville Junction, absorbing ME 104
106	Brewer	Bucksport, Blue Hill	Ellsworth		SR 15	SR 3	
107	Auburn	Turner, Livermore, East Livermore, Jay, Wilton, Farmington, Strong, Avon, Phillips, Sandy River Plantation	Rangely	F	SR 4, SR 16	SR 4, SR 14	1931: Section east of Rangeley transferred to SR 4
108	Livermore	Canton, Peru	Dixfield	O	Intact	SR 108, Main Street, US 2	1929: Extended to Rumford
109	Wells	Sanford, Acton	Wakefield, NH		Intact	SR 109	
110	Alfred	Waterboro, West Hollis	Limington		SR 110, SR 11	U.S. 202, SR 5, Chadbourne Ridge Road, SR 117	1931: Section from Alfred to East Waterboro transferred to ME 4 (now US 202); section west to Limington became part of SR 11
111	East Waterboro	Hollis Center, Bar Mills	Gorham		SR 4	U.S. 202, SR 4A	1931: Became part of SR 4
112	Saco	Sandy Brook	Bar Mills		Intact	SR 112	
113	Standish	Baldwin	Fryburg		Intact	SR 113	
114	Mosher Corner	Standish, Sebago	Naples		Intact	SR 237, SR 35, SR 114	
115	Little Falls	Windham, Gray, North Yarmouth	Yarmouth		Intact	U.S. 202, SR 115	1931: West half absorbed into ME 4 1933: West half south to West Gray restored, cosigned with ME 4
116	Naples	Casco, Poland	Mechanic Falls		SR 11		
117	Bridgton	Harrison, Otisfield	Norway		Intact	SR 117	
118	Bethel	North Waterford	Norway		Intact	SR 118, SR 35	
119	Harrison	Waterford	North Waterford		SR 35		
120	Bryant Pond	Andover	Rumford		Intact	SR 120, 232	
121	Raymond	Poland, Mechanic Falls	Welchville		Intact	SR 121	
122	Poland	New Gloucester	Auburn		Intact	SR 122	
123	South Harpswell	Harpswell Center	Brunswick		Intact	SR 123	
124	Bailey Island	Harpswell	Brunswick		SR 24	SR 24, Coombs Road, Liberty Crossing	1943: Part of jog west near Brunswick removed to build Brunswick Airport
125	Lisbon Falls	Lisbon, Bowdoin	Bowdoinham		Intact	SR 125, Preble Road, SR 125	
126	Lewiston	Sabattus, Wales, Litcfield	Richmond Corner		Intact	SR 126	
127	Gardiner	Pittston, Dresden	Wiscasset		SR 27		
128	Wiscasset	Edgecomb, Boothbay	Boothbay Harbor		SR 27		
129	South Bristol	Bristol	Damariscotta		Intact	SR 129	
130	Bristol		Damariscotta		Intact	SR 130	
131	St. George		Thomaston		Intact	SR 131	
132	Jefferson		Waldoboro		SR 32		
133	Winthrop	Wayne	Livermore Falls		Intact	SR 133	
134	Manchester	Readfield, Mt Vernon, Vienna, New Sharon, Chesterville	Farmington Falls		Intact	SR 41	1928: South end realigned along modern-day SR 41
135	Winthrop	Readfield, Manchester	Belgrade		Intact	SR 135	
136	Oakland	Smithfield	Norridgewock		SR 137		
137	Winslow	China, Albion, Freedom, Knox, Brooks, Waldo	Belfast		Intact	SR 137	
138	Benton	Unity, Troy, Dixmont	Hampden		SR 9	SR 9, US 202	1931: Realigned over modern SR 9 from Unity to Augusta
139	Unity	Thorndike, Knox, Brooks, Monroe	Winterport		Intact	SR 139	1931: Extended to Benton
140	Belgrade	Rome	New Sharon	W	SR 27		
141	Belfast	Swanville	Monroe				
142	Dixfield	Carthage, Weld	Phillips		Intact	SR 142	
143	Fairbanks	New Vineyard, New Portland, Kingfield, Carrabassett Valley, Wyman, Coplin Plantation	Eustis		SR 27		
144	Rangeley	Dallas Plantation, Lang, Coplin Plantation, Eustis, Wyman, Carrabassett Valley, Kingfield, Lexington, New Portland, Embden	North Anson		SR 16		1931: Cut back to Stratton
145	Strong	Freeman	Kingfield		SR 145, SR 142		
146	New Portland	East New Portland	North New Portland		Intact	SR 146	
147	Skowhegan	Madison	Solon		US 201		
148	Madison		East Madison		Intact	SR 148	
149	Bingham	Moscow, Mayfield, Kingsury Plantation	Abbot		SR 16		
150	Skowhegan	Cornville, Athens, Harmony, Cambridge, Parkman	Guilford		Intact	SR 150	
151	Athens	Brighton Plantation	Mayfield		Intact	SR 151	
152	Pittsfield	Palmyra, Hartland, Saint Albans, Ripley	Cambridge		Intact	SR 152	
153	St. Albans	Ripley	Dexter		SR 24	SR 23	
154	Foxcroft	Sebec, Milo, Medford, Maxfield	Howland		SR 100	SR 6	1928: Realigned east of Milo through Orneville, Lagrange, Howland, West Enfield
155	Milo	Orneville, Lagrange, Alton, Old Town	Orono		SR 16		1928: Truncated from Milo to Lagrange
156	Lagrange	Howland	West Enfield		SR 154	SR 6, SR 155	1928: Eliminated
157	Millinocket	Molunkus, Medway, East Millinocket	Mattawamkeag		Intact	SR 157	
158	Woodbridge Corner	Sherman, Stacyville, Patten, Mount Chase, Hersey, Moro Plantation, Swett Farm, Masardis, Ashland, Nashville Plantation, Portage Lake, Winterville Plantation, Eagle Lake, Wallagrass	Fort Kent		SR 11		
159	Patten	Crystal	Island Falls		Intact	SR 159	
160	Saint Francis	Saint John Plantation, Fort Kent, Frenchville	Madawaska		SR 161		1926: Truncated from Madawaska to Fort Kent
161	Caribou	Woodland, New Sweden, Stockholm, Big Madawaska, Sinclair, Cross Lake, New Canada	Fort Kent		Intact	SR 161	
162	Sinclair	Saint Agatha	Frenchville		Intact	SR 162	
163	Ashland	Castle Hill, Mapleton	Presque Isle		Intact	SR 163	
164	Presque Isle		Fort Fairfield		SR 163		
165	Easton Center		Fort Fairfield		Intact	U.S. 1A	
166	Macwahoc	North Yarmouth Academy Grant, Reed, Glenwood, Haynesville, Forkstown, Linneus, Hodgton	Houlton		Intact	U.S. 2A	
167	Lincoln	Lee, Springfield, Carroll Plantation, Kossuth, Topsfield, Codyville Plantation, Lambert Lake	Vanceboro		SR 16	SR 6	
168	Lee		Winn		Intact	SR 168	
169	Springfield	Carroll Plantation, Prentiss	Danforth		Intact	SR 169	
170	Springfield	Prentiss, Webster Plantation, Kingman	Macwahoc		Intact	SR 170	
171	Prentiss	Drew Plantation	Reed Plantation		Intact	SR 171	
172	West Enfield	Lowell, Burlington	Grand Falls		SR 100	SR 188, SR 155	
173	South Lincoln		Enfield		Intact	SR 188	
174	East Orland		Ellsworth		SR 3	U.S. 1	
175	Blue Hill	North Castine, Penobscot, Sargentville, West Brooklin, Haven, North Brooklin and South Blue Hill	Orland		Intact	SR 175 (roughly)	
176	Brooksville		North Brooksville		Intact	SR 176	
177	Penobscot		Blue Hill		Intact	SR 177, Tamworth Farm Road	
178	Brewer	Eddington, Bradley	Milford		Intact	SR 178	
179	Ellsworth	Fletcher's Landing, Waltham, Mariaville, Osborn, Aurora, Amherst, Clifton	Eddington		SR 179, SR 9		
180	Ellsworth	Otis	Clifton		Intact	SR 180	
181	Otis	Mariaville	Amherst		Intact	SR 181	
182	Hancock	Franklin	Cherryfield		Intact	SR 182	
183	Ellsworth	Trenton, Hull's Cove, Bar Harbor, Northeast Harbor, Somesville, Southwest Harbor, Tremont, Seal Cove, Indian Point	Town Hill	M	SR 3, SR 102	SR 3, SR 102, Crooked Road, SR 3, SR 102, Indian Point Road	1931: Became part of ME 102
184	Lamoine Beach	Lamoine	Ellsworth		Intact	SR 184	
185	Sullivan		Sorrento		Intact	SR 185	1928: West loop removed; extended over SR 205 to Sorrento
186	West Gouldsboro	Winter Harbor	Gouldsboro		Intact	SR 186	
187	Columbia Falls	Addison	West Jonesport	N Spur	Intact	SR 187	
188	East Machias	Machiasport	Cutler		SR 191		
189	Whiting	Trescott	Lubec	N Spur	Intact	SR 189	
190	Eastport	Pleasant Point Reservation	Perry	N Spur	Intact	SR 190	
191	Machias	Trescott, Cathance, Cooper, Meddybemps	Baring		Intact	SR 191	
192	Machias	Marshfield, Whitneyville, Northfield, Wesley, Crawford	Grove		SR 192, SR 9		1927: Realigned through Crawford, Alexander, Baileyville to Baring
193	East Eddington		East Holden		SR 175	SR 46; Rocks Road, Clark Hill Road, Mann Hill Road	Shifted post-renumbering to east side of the lakes
194	Easton Center		Canada		Ladner Road		
195	Jackman		Long Pond		SR 15	SR 6/SR 15	1930: Extended through Sandwich Academy Grant, Tauton and Raynham Academy Grant, to Rockwood
196	Lewiston	Lisbon	Topsham		Intact	SR 196	
197	Richmond Corner		Dresden		Intact	SR 197	1929: Extended west to Sabattus
198	Thompson Island	Thomson Island	Somesville		Intact	SR 198/SR 102	
199	West Penobscot		Penobscot		Intact	SR 175	
200	West Franklin	Eastbrook	Waltham		Intact	SR 200	
201	Naples		Harrison		SR 35		1926: Renumbered to ME 213
202	West Castine		Castine		Intact	SR 166	
203	Sorrento		Sorrento Center		SR 185		1928: Became part of ME 185
204	Kennebunkport		Kennebunk		SR 35		
205	Saco	Old Orchard Beach	West Scarborough		SR 5, SR 9		Extended west from Saco through Dayton, Hollis, Waterboro, Limerick, to Cornish
206	West Old Town		Old Town		SR 43		
207	Oak Hill		Prout's Neck		Intact	SR 207, Black Point Road	
208	Biddeford		Biddeford Pool		Intact	SR 208	
209	Phippsburg		Bath		Intact	SR 209	
210	Fryeburg	Lovell, Stoneham	North Waterford		SR 5		
211	Medway	East Millinocket, Grindstone, Soldiertown, Hersheytown, Stacyville	Sherman		SR 11		
212	Moro Plantation	Merrill	Smyrna		Intact	SR 212	
213	Naples		Harrison		SR 35		1926: Renumbering of ME 201
214	North Berwick		Sanford		SR 4		
215	Readfield		Manchester		SR 17		
216	Small Point		Phippsburg		Intact	SR 216	
217	Ashdale		Sebasco		Intact	Sebasco Road	Designated 1928
218	Elms		Kennebunkport		SR 9		Designated 1928
219	Rumford Point	Ashford	South Arm		SR 5	SR 5, South Arm Road	Designated 1928
220	South Warren	Friendship, Waldoboro, Washington, Liberty, Montville	Thorndike		Intact	SR 97, SR 220	
221	Bangor	Glenburn, Hudson	Bradford		SR 221, SR 11		Designated 1930
222	Caribou	Fort Fairfield	New Brunswick Line at Fort Fairfield		SR 161		
223	Caribou		Limestone		SR 89		
224	Dexter		Guilford		SR 24	SR 23	
225	Rome		Smithfield		Intact	SR 225	

=== Massachusetts ===
Massachusetts abandoned the scheme quickly with the advent of the U.S. Highway Numbering, having renumbered Route 6 south of Boston to match U.S. 3. By 1929, 2-digit routes were beginning to be assigned.

Route	From	Through	To	Modern designation
101	Rhode Island line at Seekonk	Rehoboth - Taunton - Middleboro - North Carver	Plymouth	U.S. 44
102	Taunton	Bridgewater - Whitman	Weymouth	SR 104, SR 18
103	Rhode Island line at Swansea	Swansea	Somerset	SR 103
104	East Freetown	Lakeville	Middleboro	SR 18, SR 105
105	Marion	Acushnet	Lakeville	SR 105
106	Five Corners (Easton)	West Bridgewater - Halifax	Kingston	SR 106
107	Revere	Lynn	Salem	SR 107
108	Fitchburg		Ashby	SR 31
109	Pittsfield	Dalton - Windsor - Cummington - Goshen - Williamsburg - Northampton - Amherst - Belchertown - Ware	West Brookfield	SR 9
109A	Hinsdale	Peru - Chesterfield	Williamsburg	SR 143
110	West Boylston	Clinton - Harvard - Ayer - Littleton - Chelmsford - Lowell - Lawrence - Haverhill - Merrimac	Amesbury	SR 110
111	Concord	Boxborough - Harvard - Ayer - Groton - Pepperell	New Hampshire line at Pepperell	SR 111
112	Huntington	Worthington - East Windsor - Cummington - Lithia - Spruce Corner	Shelburne Falls	SR 112, SR 143, East Windsor Road/Cole Street/Worthington Road, SR 9, Spruce Corner Road, SR 116, 112
113	Pepperell	Dunstable	Tyngsborough	SR 113
114	Salem	Peabody - Middleton	Lawrence	SR 114
115	North Grafton	Westborough - Southborough - Framingham Center - Brookline	Boston	SR 30, SR 9
115A	Newton		Boston	Beacon Street OR Commonwealth Avenue
116	Ashfield	Conway - Sunderland - Amherst - South Hadley - Holyoke - Chicopee	Springfield	SR 116
117	Leominster	Lancaster - Bolton - Stow - Maynard	Waltham	SR 117
118	Great Barrington	West Stockbridge - Richmond	Pittsfield	SR 41
119	Littleton Common	Groton - Townsend - Ashby	New Hampshire line at Ashburnham	SR 119
120	Connecticut line at Dudley	Charlton - Spencer - Paxton - Holden - Princeton	Fitchburg	SR 31
121	Ipswich	Essex	Gloucester	SR 133
122	Barre	Paxton - Worcester - Grafton - Northbridge - Uxbridge - Millville	Rhode Island line at Blackstone	SR 122
122A	Rutland	Holden - Worcester - Millbury	South Grafton	SR 122A
123	Rhode Island line at Attleboro	Attleboro - Norton - Easton - Brockton - Abington - Rockland - Norwell	Greenbush	SR 123
124	Connecticut line at Sturbridge	Sturbridge - Charlton City	Auburn	Mashapaug Road, Haynes Street, U.S. 20
125	Wilmington	Andover - Haverhill - Groveland - Newbury	Newburyport	SR 62, Andover Street, Woburn Street, Porter Road, SR 28, Elm Street, SR 125, SR 113
126	Uxbridge	Mendon - Milford - Braggville - Holliston - Framingham - Framingham Center - Sudbury - Concord - Carlisle - Chelmsford	North Chelmsford	SR 16, SR 126, Union Avenue, Edgell Road, Nobscot Road, U.S. 20, Union Avenue, Concord Road, Subury Road, SR 62, Lowell Road, Concord Road, Lowell Street, Concord Road, SR 4
127	Beverly	Manchester	Gloucester	SR 127
128	Milton	Boston - Dedham - Needham - Newton - Waltham - Lexington - Woburn - Stoneham - Wakefield - Lynnfield - Peabody	Salem	Milton Street, Neponset Valley Parkway, Milton Street, High Street (Dedham), Common Street, West Street, SR 135, Highland Avenue, Needham Street, Winchester Street, Centre Street, Walnut Street, Crafts Street, Waltham Street (Newton), High Street (Waltham), Newton Street, Main Street (Waltham), Lexington Street (Waltham), Waltham Street (Lexington), Massachusetts Avenue, Woburn Street, Lexington Street (Woburn), Pleasant Street, Montvale Avenue, SR 28, Elm Street, Albion Street, North Avenue, Water Street, Vernon Street, New Salem Street, Salem Street, Lynnfield Street, Washington Street, Main Street (Peabody), Boston Street
129	Wilmington	Reading - Wakefield	Lynn	SR 129, Walnut Street
130	Mashpee		Sandwich	SR 130
131	Connecticut line at Dudley	Southbridge - Sturbridge	Brimfield	SR 131
132	Barnstable		Hyannis	SR 132
133	Lowell	North Andover - Georgetown	Rowley	SR 133
134	South Dennis		Dennis	SR 134
135	Needham	Wellesley - Framingham - Ashland - Hopkinton	Westboro	SR 135
137	Milford	Millis - Medfield - Westwood	Dedham	SR 109
138	Rhode Island line at Fall River	Somerset - Taunton - Raynham - South Easton - Stoughton	Milton	SR 138
139	Southampton	Holyoke - Granby	Belchertown	U.S. 202
140	New Bedford	Taunton - Norton - Mansfield - Foxborough - Wrentham - Franklin - Bellingham - Milford - Upton	Grafton	SR 18, County Street, SR 140
141	Ludlow	Chicopee	Holyoke	SR 141, I-391
142	Rhode Island line at Wrentham		Wrentham	SR 121

=== New Hampshire ===
Route	From	Through	To	Modern designation
1B	New Castle		Portsmouth	SR 1B
3A	Franklin	Bristol	East Hebron	SR 3A
4A	Northwood		Durham	U.S. 4
4B	Danbury		Bristol	SR 104
16A	Somersworth		Dover	SR 9
101	Portsmouth	Exeter, Manchester, Milford, Wilton Center, Peterborough, Marlborough, Keene, Gilsum, Alstead	Walpole	SR 33, SR 27, SR 101, SR 10, SR 123A, SR 123
101A	Nashua		Milford	SR 101A
101B	Hooksett		Candia Four Corners	SR 27
101C	Hampton Beach	Hampton	Exeter	SR 27
102	Nashua	Derry	Raymond	SR 102
103	Concord	Hopkinton, Lower Village	Sunapee	SR 103
103A	Newbury		New London	SR 103A
104	Rochester		Northwood	U.S. 202
105	Profile House (Mittersill)		Bethlehem	SR 18
106	Laconia		Concord	SR 106
107	Moultonborough		Wolfeboro Falls	SR 109, SR 109A
108	Massachusetts line at Plaistow	East Kingston, Exeter, Stratham, Durham	Dover	SR 108
109	Raymond		East Kingston	SR 107
110	Berlin	West Milan	Northumberland	SR 110
111	Wentworth		Orford	SR 25A
112	Bath	Haverhill, Landaff, Easton, Woodstock	Lincoln	SR 112, SR 116
113	Hinsdale			SR 119, Old Brattleboro Road
114	Manchester	Pinardville, Goffstown, New Boston, Weare	Henniker	SR 114, SR 114A, SR 13, Parker Station Road (Goffstown), Riverdale Road (New Boston), Knox Road, Short Street, SR 77, Mt William Pond Road, George Moody Road, Henniker Road (Weare), Colby Crossing Road, Bennett Road, Old Weare Road, Ramsdell Road (Henniker)

=== Rhode Island ===
Route	From	Through	To	Modern Designation
101	Connecticut Line at Chepachet	Providence	Massachusetts Line at East Providence	U.S. 44
102	Wickford	Coventry, Nasonville	Woonsocket	SR 102, SR 146, S Main St
103	Connecticut Line at Coventry	Providence	Massachusetts Line at Warren	SR 14, Waterman St/Ave, Broadway, Veterans' Memorial Highway, SR 103
104	Providence	Smithfield	Woonsocket	Manton Ave, Woonasquatucket Ave, SR 104
107	Wakefield	Kingston	Wyoming	SR 108, SR 138
108	Providence	Lincoln	Woonsocket	SR 246, SR 146, SR 146A
112	Charlestown	Richmond	Hope Valley	SR 112, Carolina Nooseneck Road, Baker Pines Road
114	Newport	Warren, East Providence, Pawtucket	Cumberland	SR 114
117	Coventry	Apponaug	Warwick	SR 117
122	Providence	Cumberland	Woonsocket	SR 112
126	Massachusetts line at Adamsville		Tiverton	SR 179, SR 77
138	Newport	Portsmouth	Massachusetts line at Tiverton	SR 138
142	Woonsocket		Massachusetts line at Cumberland	SR 114, SR 121

=== Vermont ===
The state of Vermont already had a system of state-maintained roads by the time of the introduction of the numbering scheme. With the introduction of the U.S. Highway Numbering, it seems that Vermont was quick to drop the New England numbering where convenient, having renumbered many interstate routes by 1927.

By 1927, Route 8 in Vermont took a different course than that established in 1922. From the Massachusetts line, the route made its way along modern Route 8 to Heartwellville, then along modern Route 100 and Boyd Hill Road to Wilmington. An additional segment from Rawsonville to Londonderry is also cited in the 1927 US Bureau of Public Roads study, though its relation during this time to the former route is unclear. In later USGS topo maps, this gap was bridged by modern Route 100.

Route	From	Through	To	Modern designation
100	Newport	Hyde Park, Morrisville, Stowe, Waterbury, Stockbridge, Sherburne, West Bridgewater, Plymouth Union	Grahamville	SR 100, SR 100B, SR 100
100A	Bridgewater Corners		Plymouth Union	SR 100A
100B	Middlesex		Moretown	SR 100
101	Massachusetts line	Brattleboro, West Dummerston, Newfane, Manchester Center, Dorset	Poultney	SR 142, SR 30
102	Beecher Falls	Canaan, Bloomfield	Guildhall	SR 102
103	Bellows Falls	Chester, Proctorsville, Ludlow	Clarendon	SR 103
104	Alburg Center	Swanton, St. Albans	Cambridge	SR 78, SR 104
105	Bloomfield	Brighton, Newport Center, East Richford, Richford, Enosburg Falls, Sheldon Junction	St. Albans	SR 105, SR 105A, Chemin de la Vallée Missisquoi, QC 243, SR 243, SR 105
106	Springfield	North Springfield, Perkinsville	Woodstock	SR 106
107	North Royalton	Bethel	Stockbridge	SR 107
108	Enosburg Falls	Jeffersonville	Stowe	SR 108
109	Norton's Mills		Lac-Wallace, Quebec	SR 114, Jackson Lodge Road
110	East Barre		South Royalton	SR 110
111	Derby	Morgan Center	Island Pond	SR 111
112	Pownal		New York state line	SR 346
113	Chelsea	Post Mills	Ely	SR 113, SR 244
114	Quebec Line at Norton Mills	Island Pond	Lyndon	SR 114
115	Brandon	Forest Dale	Talcville	SR 73
116	South Burlington	Bristol	East Middlebury	SR 116
117	Richmond	Essex	Colchester	SR 117, SR 2A
118	East Berkshire	Montgomery Center	Eden	SR 118
119	Johnson		North Hyde Park	SR 100C
120	North Sheldon		Franklin	SR 120
121	Bellows Falls		North Windham	SR 121
124	Starksboro		Jonesville	Big Hollow Road, Hinesburg Hollow Road, Main Road, Bridge Street, Pond Road, Wes White Hill, Cochran Road
126	Essex Junction		St. George	SR 2A
128	Essex Center		Fairfax	SR 128
130	Jacksonville		West Halifax	SR 112
F2	Isle La Motte Station		Chazy	SR 129
F3	Gordon Landing		Keeler Bay	SR 314
F5	Charlotte		Cedar Beach	Ferry Road
F6	Vergennes		Lake Champlain	Panton Road, Basin Harbour Road
F7	Middlebury	Weybridge Hill, Addison	Chimney Point	SR 23, SR 17
F8	Middlebury	Bridport	West Bridport	SR 125, Crown Point Road
F9	Leicester	Whiting, Shoreham	Larabee's Point	Leicester-Whiting Road, Richville Road, SR 74
F9A	Cornwall		Larabee's Point	SR 74
F10	Brandon	Sudbury	Montcalm Landing	SR 73, Mount Independence Road
F10A	Larabee's Point		Orwell	SR 73
