= Maine State Route 176 =

State highway in Hancock County, Maine, US

State Route 176

Route information
- Maintained by MaineDOT
- Length: 38.04 mi (61.22 km)
- Existed: 1925–present

Major junctions
- West end: SR 175 in Brooksville
- SR 15 in Sedgwick; SR 172 in Blue Hill; SR 177 in Blue Hill
- East end: US 1 / SR 3 in Orland

Location
- Country: United States
- State: Maine
- Counties: Hancock

Highway system
- Maine State Highway System; Interstate; US; State; Auto trails; Lettered highways
← SR 175	→ SR 177

State Route 176 (SR 176) is part of Maine's system of numbered state highways, located in Hancock County. The 38-mile-long (61 km) route runs in a vertical zig-zag direction, but it is mostly signed as an east–west route. The western terminus of the route is at SR 175 in Brooksville and its eastern terminus is at U.S. Route 1 (US 1) and SR 3 in Orland.

== Junction list ==
The entire route is in Hancock County.

Location	mi	km	Destinations	Notes
Brooksville	0.00	0.00	SR 175 – No. Brooksville, Castine, Sedgwick, Sargentville	Western terminus of SR 176
Brooksville	10.0	16.1	SR 175 south – Sedgwick	Western end of SR 175 concurrency
Sedgwick	11.1	17.9	SR 175 north – Orland, Penobscot, Castine	Eastern end of SR 175 concurrency
Sedgwick	13.5	21.7	SR 15 south – Sedgwick, Deer Isle	Western end of SR 15concurrency
Blue Hill	17.6	28.3	SR 172 south / SR 175 south – Sedgwick, Brooklin	Western end of SR 172 concurrency; northern terminus of SR 175
Blue Hill	18.2	29.3	SR 177 west – Penobscot	Eastern terminus of SR 177
Blue Hill	18.3	29.5	SR 15 north – Bucksport	Eastern end of SR 15 concurrency
Blue Hill	18.5	29.8	SR 172 north – Ellsworth, Surry	Eastern end of SR 172 concurrency
Surry	28.7	46.2	SR 172 south – Blue Hill	Western end of SR 172 concurrency
Surry	28.8	46.3	SR 172 north – Ellsworth	Eastern end of SR 172 concurrency
Orland	38.27	61.59	US 1 / SR 3	Eastern terminus of SR 176
1.000 mi = 1.609 km; 1.000 km = 0.621 mi: Concurrency terminus
