= Maine State Route 199 =

State highway in Hancock County, Maine, US

State Route 199

Route information
- Maintained by MaineDOT
- Length: 10.44 mi (16.80 km)
- Existed: 1925–present

Major junctions
- South end: SR 166A in Castine
- SR 175 in Penobscot
- North end: SR 15 in Penobscot

Location
- Country: United States
- State: Maine
- Counties: Hancock

Highway system
- Maine State Highway System; Interstate; US; State; Auto trails; Lettered highways
← SR 198	→ SR 200

State Route 199 (SR 199) is part of Maine's system of numbered state highways, located in Hancock County. The route is almost completely within the town of Penobscot except for its southernmost 0.14 miles (0.23 km) near its terminus at SR 166A (formerly SR 166), which is in Castine. The route is 10.44 miles (16.80 km) long.

== Junction list ==
The entire route is in Hancock County.

Location	mi	km	Destinations	Notes
Castine	0.00	0.00	SR 166A	
Penobscot	3.50	5.63	SR 175 north – Bucksport, Orland	Southern end of SR 175 concurrency
Penobscot	5.45	8.77	SR 175 south – Sedgwick, So. Penobscot, Blue Hill	Northern end of SR 175 concurrency
Penobscot	10.44	16.80	SR 15 – Orland, Blue Hill	
1.000 mi = 1.609 km; 1.000 km = 0.621 mi: Concurrency terminus
