= Maine State Route 172 =

State highway in Hancock County, Maine, US

State Route 172

Route information
- Maintained by MaineDOT
- Length: 22.65 mi (36.45 km)

Major junctions
- South end: SR 175 in Sedgwick
- SR 15 / SR 176 in Blue Hill; SR 177 in Blue Hill
- North end: US 1 / SR 3 in Ellsworth

Location
- Country: United States
- State: Maine
- Counties: Hancock

Highway system
- Maine State Highway System; Interstate; US; State; Auto trails; Lettered highways
← SR 171	→ SR 173

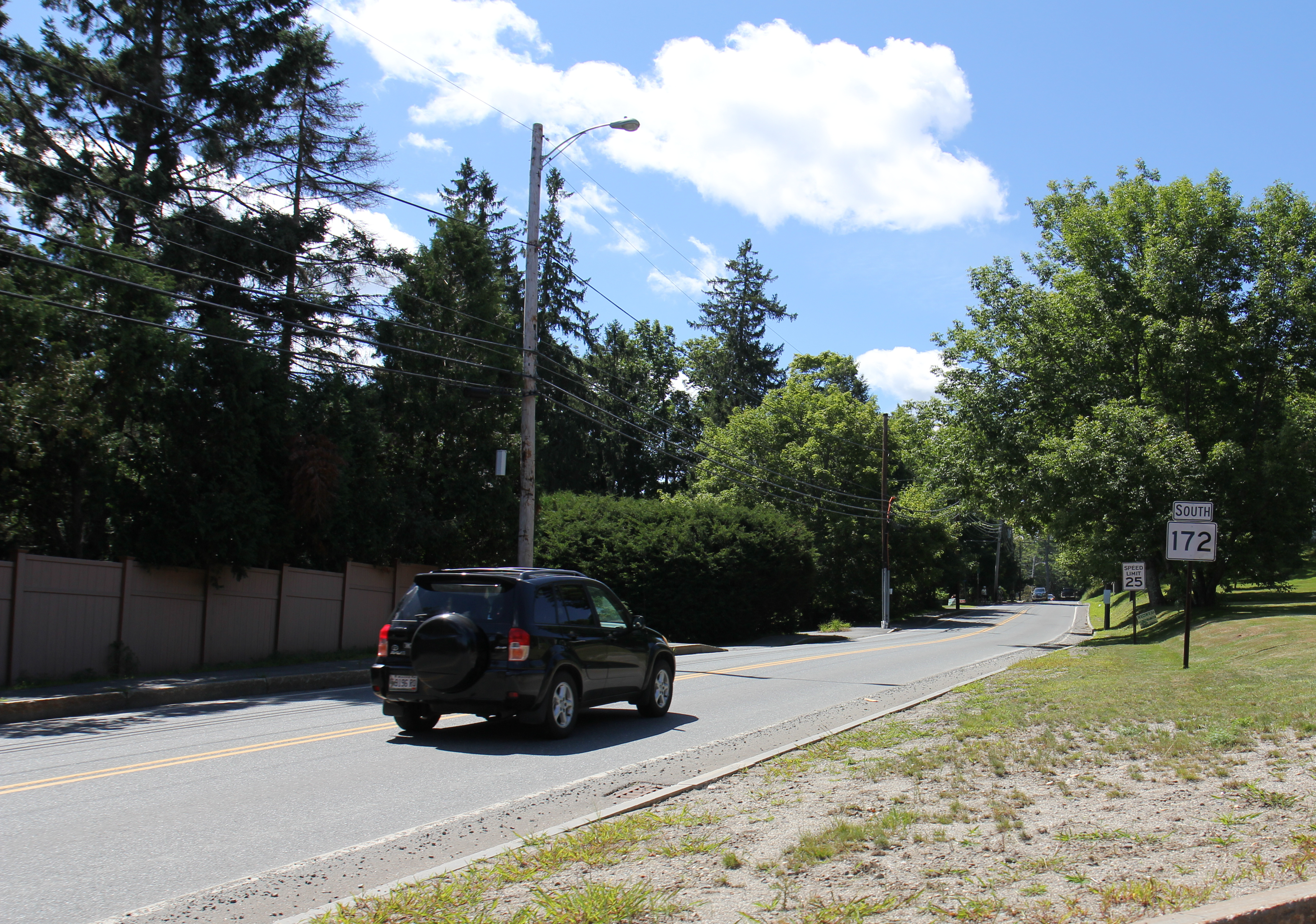
Northern terminus on US Route 1

State Route 172 (SR 172) is part of Maine's system of numbered state highways, located in Hancock County. It runs from SR 175 in Sedgwick to U.S. Route 1 (US 1) and SR 3 in Ellsworth. The route is 22.65 miles (36.45 km) long.

== Junction list ==
The entire route is in Hancock County.

Location	mi	km	Destinations	Notes
Sedgwick	0.00	0.00	SR 175 (Reach Road) – Deer Isle, Brooklin, Sargentville, Brooksville	
Blue Hill	6.11	9.83	SR 175 north (Falls Bridge Road) – Blue Hill Falls, South Blue Hill	Southern end of SR 175 concurrency
Blue Hill	8.57	13.79	SR 15 south / SR 176 west (Mines Road) / SR 175 ends / Beech Hill Road – Sedgwick, Stonington, Deer Isle	Southern end of SR 15 / SR 176 concurrency; northern terminus of SR 175; roundabout
Blue Hill	9.14	14.71	SR 177 west (Union Street) / Water Street – Penobscot	Eastern terminus of SR 177
Blue Hill	9.24	14.87	SR 15 north (Pleasant Street) – Bucksport	Northern end of SR 15 concurrency
Blue Hill	9.46	15.22	SR 176 east (East Blue Hill Road) – East Blue Hill	Northern end of SR 176 concurrency
Surry	16.22	26.10	SR 176 south (Morgan Bay Road) – East Blue Hill	Southern end of SR 176 concurrency
Surry	16.27	26.18	SR 176 east (Toddy Pond Road) – Bucksport	Northern end of SR 176 concurrency
Ellsworth	22.65	36.45	US 1 north / SR 3 east (Main Street) – Ellsworth, Bar Harbor	Northbound SR 172 to US 1 northbound / southbound US 1 to southbound SR 172 only
1.000 mi = 1.609 km; 1.000 km = 0.621 mi: Concurrency terminus; Incomplete access
