= Maine State Route 166 =

State highway in Hancock County, Maine, US

State Route 166
- SR 166 in red, SR 166A in blue

Route information
- Maintained by MaineDOT
- Length: 14.9 mi (24.0 km)

Major junctions
- South end: Main Street/Battle Avenue in Castine
- North end: US 1 / SR 3 / SR 15 in Orland

Location
- Country: United States
- State: Maine
- Counties: Hancock

Highway system
- Maine State Highway System; Interstate; US; State; Auto trails; Lettered highways
← SR 165	→ SR 167
← SR 201	→ SR 203

State Route 166 (SR 166) is part of Maine's system of numbered state highways, located in the southern coastal part of the state adjacent to the mouth of the Penobscot River. It runs just under fifteen miles (24 km) between the town of Castine and Orland at U.S. Route 1 (US 1) and SR 3/SR 15.

== Route description ==
The southern terminus of SR 166 is located at the intersection of Battle Avenue and Main Street in Castine, near the Maine Maritime Academy main campus. Battle Avenue carries the initial stretch before turning northward as Castine Road as the route exits the downtown area. SR 166A splits off just to the northeast towards the Bagaduce River to the east. SR 166 turns to the northwest at this point to run closer to the Penobscot River along The Shore Road. This portion of the road heads north through the settlement of West Castine passing some small houses along the way. Continuing north, intersecting the northern end of the SR 166A half-loop at Morse Cove. Now in the town of Penobscot and following Castine Road again, SR 166 parallels the river even closer and reaches the terminus of SR 175 at the settlement of West Penobscot.

North of SR 175, the road ends paralleling the Penobscot River but begins following the route of the Orland River at South Orland within the town of Orland. Past here, SR 166 heads into a less populated stretch of land, mostly in wooded areas. As the road comes closer to the center of the town, the number of houses lining the road increases. SR 166 curves to the west at Old Country Road and crosses the Orland River on a small bridge. Now in the business district of the town, SR 166 passes small markets, boating shops, and a post office a peninsula known as Leaches Point. After passing a few more houses, Castine Road and SR 166 ends at a stop-controlled intersection with Acadia Highway (carrying US 1, SR 3, and SR 15).

== History ==
Modern SR 166, as first designated in 1939, actually existed as two separate split routes—SR 166W and SR 166E.

State Route 166E was a renumbering of State Route 202, which was first designated in 1925. When US 202 was designated in Maine in 1934, it became a duplicate numbering but was not renumbered until 1939. SR 166E was the longer of the two split routes, serving Castine to the south and connecting with SR 175 to the north. This designation only lasted until 1941, when SR 166E, SR 175 and SR 199 underwent routing changes. The remaining length of SR 166E was renumbered as SR 166.

State Route 166W was a newly designated half-loop routing along the western side of the peninsula, and persisted even after SR 166E was renumbered. This route was eventually renumbered SR 166A in 1947.

Throughout most of its history, SR 166 ran along the west side of the peninsula in Castine (with an intersection at SR 199) and ended at SR 175. SR 175 continued north along Castine Road through Orland. In August 2014, a Maine Department of Transportation official proposed swapping the designations of SR 166 and SR 166A as the western route was the most direct route into Castine and the extension of SR 166 to Orland to prevent travelers from following multiple route numbers from US 1 to Castine. Both changes were implemented by June 2015.

=== Pre-renumbering (1925-36) ===
The first highway in Maine numbered 166 was located in the northeastern part of the state. It was designated in 1925 and ran between Magadahoc and Houlton. In 1936, the entire route was redesignated as US 2A.

== Junction list ==
The entire route is in Hancock County.

Location	mi	km	Destinations	Notes
Castine	0.0	0.0	Main Street / Battle Avenue	
Castine	1.3	2.1	SR 166A north (Castine Road)	Southern terminus of SR 166A
Castine–Penobscot line	5.1	8.2	SR 166A south (Castine Road)	Northern terminus of SR 166A
Penobscot	6.9	11.1	SR 175 south (Castine Road/New Road) – Penobscot	Northern terminus of SR 175
Orland	14.9	24.0	US 1 / SR 3 / SR 15 (Acadia Highway) – Bucksport, Belfast, Ellsworth, Bar Harbor	
1.000 mi = 1.609 km; 1.000 km = 0.621 mi

== State Route 166A ==
State Route 166A
- Location: Castine
- Length: 4.1 mi (6.6 km)
- Existed: 1947–present

State Route 166A, also known as Castine Road, is a town-maintained alternate route of SR 166 in Castine, running 4.1 miles (6.6 km) on the eastern side of the peninsula. It forms a half-loop and connects with its parent at both ends. The route originally ran along the west side of the peninsula on The Shore Road. It was first designated in 1939 as SR 166W and what became SR 166 was designated SR 166E. After reorganization of several routes in 1940, SR 166E was redesignated as SR 166 proper. SR 166W retained its designation until 1947, when it was renumbered to 166A. SR 166 and SR 166A were swapped between 2014 and 2015 to improve traveler access to the downtown area of Castine.

SR 166A begins at an intersection with SR 166 in Castine, north of its downtown. It generally heads northeast near the Bagaduce River heading past small houses and undeveloped areas consisting of forests and brush. After passing through the settlement of North Castine, it intersects SR 199 at its southern terminus. The road then heads north through a more wooded area. The town line between Castine and Penobscot begins to run down the road and does so for the remainder of its route. SR 166A ends at SR 166 at Morse Cove.

Junction list

The entire route is in Hancock County.

Location	mi	km	Destinations	Notes
Castine	0.0	0.0	SR 166 (Castine Road / The Shore Road)	
Castine	2.5	4.0	SR 199 north (Dunbar Road) – Penobscot	Southern terminus of SR 199
Castine–Penobscot line	4.1	6.6	SR 166 (Castine Road / The Shore Road)	
1.000 mi = 1.609 km; 1.000 km = 0.621 mi

== See also ==
- Off-the-Neck Historic District - Federally-designated historic district along SR 166 and SR 166A in Castine
