= Blue Hill (CDP), Maine =

Blue Hill, Maine
- Census-designated place
- Location within Maine Location within the United States
- Coordinates: 44°24′33″N 68°35′17″W
- Country: United States
- State: Maine
- County: Hancock
- Town: Blue Hill

Area
  - Total: 4.71 sq mi (12.21 km^{2})
  - Land: 4.71 sq mi (12.19 km^{2})
  - Water: 0.0077 sq mi (0.02 km^{2})
- Elevation: 36 ft (11 m)

Population (2020)
  - Total: 963
  - Density: 200/sq mi (79/km^{2})
- Time zone: UTC-5 (Eastern (EST))
  - Summer (DST): UTC-4 (EDT)
- ZIP code: 04614
- Area code: 207
- FIPS code: 23-05665
- GNIS feature ID: 2630697

Blue Hill is a census-designated place (CDP) in the town of Blue Hill in Hancock County, Maine, United States. The CDP population was 943 as per the 2010 census, out of a population of 2,686 in the town of Blue Hill as a whole.

== Geography ==
The Blue Hill CDP consists of the main village, within the town of Blue Hill. The CDP is located at the geographic center of the town, surrounding the head of Blue Hill Harbor, an arm of Blue Hill Bay. The CDP extends south along Route 175 as far as Bragdon Brook, just north of Blue Hill Falls; southwest along Routes 15 and 176 as far as Grindleville Road; west along Route 177 (Union Street) to Field House Lane; northwest along Route 15 past Mountain Road to the southern slopes of Blue Hill; northeast along Route 172 past Mountain Road; and east along Route 176 to Peters Cove and Little Peters Brook. The 935-foot (285 m) summit of Blue Hill is just outside the CDP to the north.

Ellsworth is 14 miles (23 km) northeast of Blue Hill via Route 172, Bucksport is 17 miles (27 km) to the northwest via Route 15, and the village of Deer Isle is 18 miles (29 km) south via Route 15.

According to the United States Census Bureau, the CDP has a total area of 4.7 square miles (12.2 km^{2}), of which 0.01 square miles (0.02 km^{2}), or 0.19%, are water.

== Demographics ==
Historical population
Census	Pop.	Note	%±
2020	963		—
U.S. Decennial Census
