= Off-the-Neck Historic District =

Historic district in Maine, United States

- U.S. National Register of Historic Places
- U.S. Historic district
- Location within Maine Location within the United States
- Location: ME 166, Castine, Maine
- Area: 380 acres (150 ha)
- Architectural style: Federal, Defensive canal
- NRHP reference No.: 86002442
- Added to NRHP: September 25, 1986

The Off-the-Neck Historic District encompasses a well-preserved set of early 19th-century rural properties on Maine State Route 166 (SR 166) in Castine, Maine, as well as canal dug in 1779 by British forces during the American Revolutionary War across the neck separating the Bagaduce Peninsula (where the main village of Castine is located) from the mainland. The district takes its name from the fact that the included properties are just north of this neck on the mainland. The district was listed on the National Register of Historic Places in 1986.

== Description and history ==
Maine State Route 166 (SR 166) is the principal state road leading northward from the village of Castine, which is located at the end of a large peninsula defined by Penobscot Bay on the west and the Bagaduce River on the east. The village proper is located on the Bagaduce Peninsula, which is separated from the larger peninsula by a neck of land between Wadsworth Cove and Hatch Cove. From this neck, SR 166 runs roughly north-by-northeast, paralleling the Bagaduce River up to a junction with Maine State Route 199. SR 166A runs follows a more northerly course, beginning just north of the neck and paralleling the Penobscot Bay shore. The neck was made a more prominent geographic division of the town during the American Revolutionary War, when British forces occupying Castine dug a canal 10 to 12 feet (3.0 to 3.7 m) wide across it. The British occupation was notable in Castine's history as the focus of the disastrous Penobscot Expedition, an attempt by the state of Massachusetts (which Maine was then part of) to dislodge them. The canal forms the southern boundary of this district.

Stretching northward from the canal on the mainland for about 2 miles (3.2 km), SR 166 is a rural road, along which are eleven houses built between about 1765 and 1830. All but one have fairly typical Federal period styling, and are either 1-1/2 or 2 stories in height, with a gable roof, clapboard siding, and either a large central chimney or a pair of end chimneys. The oldest house, dating to c. 1765, has vernacular Georgian styling. The collection of properties provides a remarkably well-preserved view of what rural Castine looked like 200 years ago.

== See also ==
- National Register of Historic Places listings in Hancock County, Maine
