= Castine (CDP), Maine =

Castine, Maine
- Census-designated place
- Location within Maine Location within the United States
- Coordinates: 44°23′33″N 68°48′24″W
- Country: United States
- State: Maine
- County: Hancock
- Town: Castine

Area
  - Total: 1.55 sq mi (4.01 km^{2})
  - Land: 1.54 sq mi (3.99 km^{2})
  - Water: 0.0077 sq mi (0.02 km^{2})
- Elevation: 157 ft (48 m)

Population (2020)
  - Total: 1,014
  - Density: 657.7/sq mi (253.93/km^{2})
- Time zone: UTC-5 (Eastern (EST))
  - Summer (DST): UTC-4 (EDT)
- ZIP code: 04420, 04421
- Area code: 207
- FIPS code: 23-11230
- GNIS feature ID: 2630699

Castine is a census-designated place (CDP) in the town of Castine in Hancock County, Maine, United States. The CDP population was 1,029 at the 2010 census, out of 1,366 people in the town as a whole.

== Geography ==
The Castine CDP occupies the southern end of the town of Castine, occupying the entire peninsula on which the town's main village of Castine is located. It is bordered to the west by Penobscot Bay, to the south by Castine Harbor and the tidal Bagaduce River, to the northeast by Hatch Cove, and to the northwest by Wadsworth Cove, an arm of Penobscot Bay. The CDP crosses the "British Canal", a small waterway cutting the isthmus and connecting the two coves, and extends north as far as Shore Road.

Maine State Route 166 has its southern terminus in Castine, and leads north 7 miles (11 km) to West Penobscot. Bucksport is 17 miles (27 km) north of Castine via Routes 166, 175, and 1.

According to the United States Census Bureau, the Castine CDP has a total area of 1.5 square miles (4.0 km^{2}), of which 0.01 square miles (0.02 km^{2}), or 0.40%, are water.

The Maine Maritime Academy is located in the Castine CDP.

== Demographics ==
Historical population
| Census | Pop. | Note | %± |
|---|---|---|---|
| 2020 | 1,014 | | — |
U.S. Decennial Census

== See also ==
- John Perkins House (Castine, Maine)
