= Maine State Route 15 =

State highway in Maine, US

State Route 15
- Route of SR 15 highlighted in red, SR 15 Bus. in green

Route information
- Maintained by MaineDOT
- Length: 180.5 mi (290.5 km)
- Existed: 1925–present

Major junctions
- South end: Main Street / West Main Street / School Street in Stonington
- US 1 / SR 3 in Bucksport; I-395 / SR 9 in Bangor; US 202 / SR 9 in Bangor; I-95 in Bangor; US 2 / SR 100 in Bangor; SR 11 in Corinth
- North end: US 201 / SR 6 in Jackman

Location
- Country: United States
- State: Maine
- Counties: Hancock, Penobscot, Piscataquis, Somerset

Highway system
- Maine State Highway System; Interstate; US; State; Auto trails; Lettered highways
← SR 11A	→ SR 16
← SR 172	→ SR 173

State Route 15 (SR 15) is a numbered state highway in Maine, United States. SR 15 runs over 180 miles (290 km) from Stonington in the south to Jackman in the north.

== Route description ==
SR 15 begins in the town of Stonington, at the intersection of Main Street, School Street, and West Main Street. The route proceeds north out of Stonington and through Deer Isle en route to the mainland of Maine. Upon leaving the islands to the south via the Deer Isle Bridge, SR 15 meets SR 175 and forms an approximately 2-mile (3.2 km) concurrency with it. SR 15 then splits off 175 and then joins SR 176 farther to the north. The two routes continue into Blue Hill, where SR 15 turns northward, while 176 goes to the east. Continuing north, Route 15 meets SR 199 in North Penobscot. Upon reaching Orland, SR 15 meets U.S. Route 1 (US 1) and SR 3, and joins the concurrency northbound. The road sees the ends of Routes 166 and 46 before reaching the town of Bucksport. Upon reaching the town, US 1 and SR 3 split off and SR 15 turns northward towards Bangor.

SR 15 continues towards Bangor, straddling the east side of the Penobscot River, along with US-1A to the west. SR 15 enters Brewer and follows South Main Street to an interchange with Interstate 395 and SR 9 at exit 4. SR 15 joins I-395 westbound and runs concurrent with the Interstate (also with SR 9 between exits 4 and 2) to its terminus, where SR 15 then takes exit 1B to join I-95 northbound for approximately 3 miles (4.8 km). SR 15 leaves I-95 via exit 185 and joins Broadway heading north out of the city. SR 15 meets SR 221 at Six Mile Falls before entering Glenburn. The route intersects with SR 11 and SR 43 in Corinth, forming a 2-mile (3.2 km) concurrency with SR 11.

SR 15 continues to the northwest, intersecting with SR 6 and SR 16 in Dover-Foxcroft, forming a lengthy concurrency. The three routes proceed due west through Guilford, intersecting SR 23 and SR 150, and then turning to the north in Abbot Village, where SR 16 splits off to the west. Routes 6 and 15 remain concurrent for the better part of about 60 miles (97 km), traveling north to Moosehead Lake, and turning west to the small town of Jackman. Routes 6 and 15 finally come to an intersection with US 201, approximately 12 miles (19 km) from the Canadian border. SR 15 ends at this intersection, while SR 6 joins US 201 en route to the Canadian border.

=== Local names ===
Within the towns connected by State Route 15, the highway also is known by various local names:

- Bangor: Broadway
- Brewer: South Main Street
- Orrington: River Road
- Bucksport: Main Street
- Monson: Main Street

== History ==
When originally designated in 1926, SR 15 ran between Ellsworth and Greenville Junction. Between 1933 and 1934, it was extended north to Rockwood, and again, in 1940, to its current terminus in Jackman.

In 1946, the route was truncated to Blue Hill, but, in 1963, it was extended south to its current terminus in Stonington.

In 2004, SR 15 in Bangor was removed from downtown and routed along I-395 and I-95. The old alignment through downtown became SR 15 Business (see below).

== Major intersections ==
County	Location	mi	km	Destinations	Notes
Hancock	Stonington	0.0	0.0	School Street	Southern terminus of SR 15
Hancock	Eggemoggin Reach	11.5– 12.0	18.5– 19.3	Deer Isle Bridge	
Hancock	Sedgwick	13.8	22.2	SR 175 south (Reach Road) – Brooklin	Begin SR 175 concurrency
Hancock	Sedgwick	16.0	25.7	SR 175 north (Coastal Road) – Brooksville	End SR 175 concurrency
Hancock	Sedgwick	18.9	30.4	SR 176 west (Southern Bay Road) – Penobscot, Castine	Begin SR 176 concurrency
Hancock	Blue Hill	23.0	37.0	SR 175 south (South Street) – Brooklin	Southern terminus of SR 175
Hancock	Blue Hill	23.6	38.0	SR 177 west (Union Street) – Penobscot	Eastern terminus of SR 177
Hancock	Blue Hill	23.7	38.1	SR 176 east – Ellsworth	End SR 176 concurrency
Hancock	Penobscot	32.4	52.1	SR 199 south (N Penobscot Road)	Northern terminus of SR 199
Hancock	Orland	36.1	58.1	US 1 north / SR 3 east (Acadia Highway) – Bar Harbor, Calais	Begin US 1/SR 3 concurrency
Hancock	Orland	38.7	62.3	SR 166 south (Castine Road) – Castine, Orland	Northern terminus of SR 166; former SR 175
Hancock	Bucksport	39.4	63.4	SR 46 north (Duck Cove Road)	Southern terminus of SR 46
Hancock	Bucksport	40.5	65.2	US 1 south / SR 3 west (Acadia Highway) – Belfast	End US 1/SR 3 concurrency
Penobscot	Brewer	57.9	93.2	I-395 east / SR 9 east to US 1A – Calais, Ellsworth, Bar Harbor SR 15 Bus. north (South Main Street) – Brewer	Beginning of I-395/SR 9/SR 15 concurrency; southern terminus of SR 15B; exit 4 (I-395)
Penobscot	Bangor	58.8	94.6	US 1A / SR 9 Bus. – Bangor, Hampden	Exit 3 on I-395
Penobscot	Bangor	59.5	95.8	US 202 / SR 9 west – Hampden	Exit 2 on I-395; end of I-395/SR 9/SR 15 concurrency; Eastern terminus of US 202
Penobscot	Bangor	60.0	96.6	I-95 south – Newport To US 2 west / SR 100 – Hermon	Western terminus of I-395; Begin I-95 concurrency, exit 182A-B (I-95); exit 1 (I-395)
Penobscot	Bangor	60.9	98.0	US 2 (Hammond Street) / SR 100 – Airport	Exit 183
Penobscot	Bangor	61.7	99.3	SR 222 (Union Street) – Airport	Exit 184
Penobscot	Bangor	63.3	101.9	I-95 north – Orono, Houlton SR 15 Bus. south (Broadway) – Business District, Brewer	Exit 185 (I-95); end I-95 concurrency; northern terminus of SR 15B
Penobscot	Bangor	67.3	108.3	SR 221 north (Hudson Road) – Hudson, Bradford	Southern terminus of SR 221
Penobscot	Corinth	81.7	131.5	SR 11 south (Exeter Road) / SR 43 (Hudson Road) – Exeter, Hudson	Begin SR 11 concurrency
Penobscot	Charleston	83.4	134.2	SR 11 north (Main Road) – Charleston, Milo	End SR 11 concurrency
Piscataquis	Dover-Foxcroft	98.3	158.2	SR 7 south (South Street) – Dexter	Northern terminus of SR 7
Piscataquis	Dover-Foxcroft	98.5	158.5	SR 6 / SR 16 east – Milo	Begin SR 6/SR 16 concurrency
Piscataquis	Guilford	105.1	169.1	SR 23 south (Bridge Street) – Dexter, Newport	Northern terminus of SR 23
Piscataquis	Guilford	106.2	170.9	SR 150 north (Blaine Avenue)	Begin SR 150 concurrency
Piscataquis	Guilford	106.5	171.4	SR 150 south (Main Street) – Skowhegan, Sangerville	End SR 150 concurrency
Piscataquis	Abbot	110.3	177.5	SR 16 west (West Road) – Mayfield, Bingham	End SR 16 concurrency
Somerset	Jackman	180.5	290.5	US 201 / SR 6 west – Bingham, Jackman Bus. Dist., Quebec, P.Q.	Northern terminus of SR 15; End SR 6 concurrency
1.000 mi = 1.609 km; 1.000 km = 0.621 mi: Concurrency terminus

== Auxiliary route ==
State Route 15 Business
- Location: Brewer–Bangor
- Length: 2.8 mi (4.5 km)
- Existed: 2004–present

State Route 15 Business (abbreviated SR 15 Bus. or SR 15B) is a 2.8-mile (4.5 km) business route of SR 15. Its southern terminus is at I-395, SR 15, and SR 9 in Brewer. Its northern terminus is at I-95 and SR 15 in Bangor.

SR 15 Business was designated in 2004 after SR 15 was removed from its surface alignment in downtown Bangor and Brewer, instead being routed along I-395 and I-95 to bypass the downtown areas.

Junction list

The entire route is in Penobscot County.

Location	mi	km	Destinations	Notes
Brewer	0.0	0.0	I-395 / SR 9 / SR 15	Southern terminus of SR 15B
Brewer	0.8	1.3	US 1A / SR 9 Bus. west	Begin SR 9 Bus. concurrency
Brewer	1.0	1.6	SR 9 Bus. east (Main Street)	End SR 9 Bus. concurrency
Bangor	1.6	2.6	US 2 (State Street)	
Bangor	2.8	4.5	I-95 / SR 15	Northern terminus of SR 15B
1.000 mi = 1.609 km; 1.000 km = 0.621 mi: Concurrency terminus
