= Maine State Route 46 =

State highway in Maine, US

State Route 46

Route information
- Maintained by MaineDOT
- Length: 18.76 mi (30.19 km)
- Existed: 1960–present

Major junctions
- South end: US 1 / SR 3 / SR 15 in Orland
- US 1A in Holden
- North end: SR 9 in Eddington

Location
- Country: United States
- State: Maine
- Counties: Hancock, Penobscot

Highway system
- Maine State Highway System; Interstate; US; State; Auto trails; Lettered highways
| ← SR 43 | → SR 52 |

State Route 46 (abbreviated SR 46) is part of Maine's system of numbered state highways, located in the central coastal part of the state. It is 18.76 miles (30.19 km) in length. Its southern terminus is located on the Orland—Bucksport town line at U.S. Route 1, State Route 3 and State Route 15. Its northern terminus is located east of Eddington at State Route 9.

== Route description ==
SR 46 begins at an intersection with US 1, SR 3, and SR 15 on the town line between Orland and Bucksport. It runs almost directly on the border for 1 mile (1.6 km) before turning northward into Bucksport. SR 41 crosses through the western edge of Dedham and then the eastern edge of Holden, where it crosses US 1A. SR 41 crosses into Eddington where it runs along the east side of the Holbrook and Davis Ponds before reaching its northern terminus at SR 9.

== History ==
The entirety of SR 46 used to be part of SR 175 as first designated in 1925. In 1960, SR 175 was truncated to its current northern terminus in Orland and its concurrency with US 1 / SR 3 / SR 15 was eliminated. The remainder of its northern segment was renumbered SR 46.

== Junction list ==
| County | Location | mi | km | Destinations | Notes |
|---|---|---|---|---|---|
| Hancock | Orland | 0.0 | 0.0 | US 1 / SR 3 / SR 15 (Acadia Highway) to SR 175 – Bucksport, Ellsworth | Southern terminus of SR 46 |
| Penobscot | Holden | 13.8 | 22.2 | US 1A (Main Road) – Bangor, Ellsworth | To I-395 |
| Penobscot | Eddington | 18.7 | 30.1 | SR 9 (Main Road) – Brewer, Calais | Northern terminus of SR 46 |
1.000 mi = 1.609 km; 1.000 km = 0.621 mi
