= Crawford, Maine =

Town in Maine, United States

- Town
- Location within Maine Location within the United States
- Coordinates: 45°00′20″N 67°35′19″W
- Country: United States
- State: Maine
- County: Washington

Area
  - Total: 37.78 sq mi (97.85 km^{2})
  - Land: 34.52 sq mi (89.41 km^{2})
  - Water: 3.26 sq mi (8.44 km^{2})
- Elevation: 131 ft (40 m)

Population (2020)
  - Total: 93
  - Density: 2.6/sq mi (1/km^{2})
- Time zone: UTC-5 (Eastern (EST))
  - Summer (DST): UTC-4 (EDT)
- ZIP code: 04694
- Area code: 207
- FIPS code: 23-14940
- GNIS feature ID: 582424

Crawford is a town in Washington County, Maine, United States. The town was named after William H. Crawford, Secretary of the Treasury. The population was 93 at the 2020 census.

== History ==
Crawford was incorporated on February 11, 1828, under the name Adams, presumably after then-incumbent President, John Q. Adams. The name was changed to Crawford only 17 days later on February 28, 1828, in honor of former Secretary of Treasury William H. Crawford of Georgia.

== Geography ==
According to the United States Census Bureau, the town has a total area of 37.78 square miles (97.85 km^{2}), of which 34.52 square miles (89.41 km^{2}) is land and 3.26 square miles (8.44 km^{2}) is water.

=== Adjacent municipalities ===
- Alexander, Maine (east)
- Cooper, Maine (southeast)
- Wesley, Maine (southwest)

== Demographics ==
Historical population
Census	Pop.	Note	%±
1830	182		—
1840	300		64.8%
1850	324		8.0%
1860	273		−15.7%
1870	209		−23.4%
1880	206		−1.4%
1890	140		−32.0%
1900	112		−20.0%
1910	114		1.8%
1920	119		4.4%
1930	120		0.8%
1940	136		13.3%
1950	83		−39.0%
1960	83		0.0%
1970	74		−10.8%
1980	86		16.2%
1990	89		3.5%
2000	108		21.3%
2010	105		−2.8%
2020	93		−11.4%
U.S. Decennial Census

=== 2010 census ===
As of the census of 2010, there were 105 people, 48 households, and 32 families living in the town. The population density was 3.0 inhabitants per square mile (1.2/km^{2}). There were 118 housing units at an average density of 3.4 per square mile (1.3/km^{2}). The racial makeup of the town was 100.0% White. Hispanic or Latino of any race were 1.9% of the population.

There were 48 households, of which 27.1% had children under the age of 18 living with them, 60.4% were married couples living together, 4.2% had a female householder with no husband present, 2.1% had a male householder with no wife present, and 33.3% were non-families. 27.1% of all households were made up of individuals, and 10.4% had someone living alone who was 65 years of age or older. The average household size was 2.19 and the average family size was 2.63.

The median age in the town was 50.5 years. 17.1% of residents were under the age of 18; 4.9% were between the ages of 18 and 24; 11.5% were from 25 to 44; 43.8% were from 45 to 64; and 22.9% were 65 years of age or older. The gender makeup of the town was 44.8% male and 55.2% female.

=== 2000 census ===
As of the census of 2000, there were 108 people, 41 households, and 31 families living in the town. The population density was 3.1 inhabitants per square mile (1.2/km^{2}). There were 99 housing units at an average density of 2.9 per square mile (1.1/km^{2}). The racial makeup of the town was 97.22% White, 0.93% Native American, 0.93% from other races, and 0.93% from two or more races. Hispanic or Latino of any race were 0.93% of the population.

There were 41 households, out of which 29.3% had children under the age of 18 living with them, 58.5% were married couples living together, 12.2% had a female householder with no husband present, and 22.0% were non-families. 17.1% of all households were made up of individuals, and 9.8% had someone living alone who was 65 years of age or older. The average household size was 2.63 and the average family size was 2.88.

In the town, the population was spread out, with 28.7% under the age of 18, 1.9% from 18 to 24, 29.6% from 25 to 44, 22.2% from 45 to 64, and 17.6% who were 65 years of age or older. The median age was 39 years. For every 100 females, there were 100.0 males. For every 100 females age 18 and over, there were 108.1 males.

The median income for a household in the town was $43,125, and the median income for a family was $27,083. Males had a median income of $46,250 versus $25,625 for females. The per capita income for the town was $13,864. There were 24.1% of families and 24.0% of the population living below the poverty line, including 31.3% of under eighteens and 25.9% of those over 64.
