= Maine State Route 175 =

State highway in Hancock County, Maine, US

State Route 175

Route information
- Maintained by MaineDOT
- Length: 37.8 mi (60.8 km)

Major junctions
- From: SR 15 / SR 172 / SR 176 in Blue Hill
- SR 15 in Sedgwick
- To: SR 166 in Penobscot

Location
- Country: United States
- State: Maine
- Counties: Hancock

Highway system
- Maine State Highway System; Interstate; US; State; Auto trails; Lettered highways
← SR 174	→ SR 176

State Route 175 (SR 175) is a state highway entirely in Hancock County, Maine that travels for 37.8 miles (60.8 km). The shape of the route is an unusual U-shape and travels along the peninsula surrounded by Blue Hill Bay, Eggemoggin Reach, and Bagaduce River. The route is signed as north-south but has two northern termini: at State Routes 15, 172, and 176 in Blue Hill, and at SR 166 in Penobscot. The transition point of the directional signage occurs about 2 1/2 miles (4.0 km) from the Blue Hill terminus.

== Route description ==
SR 175 begins at a roundabout in Blue Hill. The roundabout's legs include SR 15/SR 176 to the southwest and northeast, Beech Hill Road to the northwest (which connects to SR 177), and SR 172 on the southeast and northeast legs. SR 172 and SR 175 together head southeast from there on a concurrency, both routes signed as south, through a commercial shopping area, but this gives way to a stretch of some houses lining both sides of the road. Two and a half miles (4.0 km) later, SR 175 splits off from SR 172 at Blue Hill Falls and heads east and south on Falls Bridge Road. The first sign for "North SR 175" is found just past this intersection. The road now runs very close to the Blue Hill Bay and crosses over several small fingers from the bay. It travels south along the Blue Hill Neck peninsula passing through the hamlet of South Blue Hill. It then enters the town of Brooklin where it travels through the settlement of North Brooklin and bending towards the southwest at Herrick Bay. In the center of Brooklin, the road turns towards the west to follow Eggemoggin Reach. SR 175 begins to curve to the north to follow the short Benjamin River. Past West Brooklin, the road turns to the west again to cross the river and enter the town of Sedgwick.

Upon entering the town, SR 175 reaches the town center of Sedgwick. It executes a pair of sharp bends to the south at High Street and continues west past some houses. It intersects SR 172 at its southern terminus. Reach Road and SR 175 continues west but makes a sharp curve to the south at Cross Road. At Sargentville, SR 15 meets SR 175 and the two routes together head north along Caterpillar Hill Road. The road climbs along the side of the hill of the same name before descending and entering an annex of Brooksville. At Black Corner, SR 175 turns off of SR 15 and heads west along Coastal Road towards the center of Brooksville. Before reaching the center, SR 175 turns onto Bagaduce Road while SR 176 begins and continues west along Coastal Road. As the road name implies, it follows the Bagaduce River on its west side. Upon reaching North Brooksville, the road reaches SR 176 which had followed the other side of the peninsula. The two roads form a concurrency northeast along Bridge Road. It crosses the river, re-enters Sedgwick, and comes to a T-intersection at Southern Bay Road. SR 176 heads southeast while SR 175 continues northwest into the town of Penobscot.

Now heading along the east side of the Bagaduce River, the road heads through a mostly wooded area with some houses lining the road. At the settlement of South Penobscot, SR 176 reaches the western terminus of SR 177. Through here, it passes a market, but mostly houses. The road continues northwest into the center of Penobscot where it passes a church and additional houses. In front of Penobscot's town hall, SR 199 intersects SR 175 and then both head west forming a wrong-way concurrency alongside Northern Bay. The road curves around the north side of the bay and its coves before SR 175 breaks away from the concurrency after two miles (3.2 km). SR 175 heads almost due west towards the Penobscot Bay passing through a mostly wooded area before ending at SR 166, Castine Road.

Along its concurrency with SR 15, SR 175 is part of the state highway system therefore maintained by Maine Department of Transportation (MaineDOT) year-round. On all other portions, the road is part of the State Aid System and is maintained by MaineDOT during the summer and by its respective town during the winter.

== History ==
SR 175 formerly extended further north from its westernmost point to Orland at U.S. Route 1. In 2014, to simplify route numbering for travelers between Orland and Castine, MaineDOT proposed the truncation of SR 175 to SR 166. The change took place by June 2015.

== Major junctions ==
The entire route is in Hancock County.

Location	mi	km	Destinations	Notes
Blue Hill	0.0	0.0	SR 15 / SR 172 north / SR 176 (Mines Road / Main Street) / Beech Hill Road – Sedgwick, Ellsworth	Northern end of SR 172 concurrency; roundabout
Blue Hill	2.5	4.0	SR 172 south (Salt Point Road) – Sedgwick	Southern end of SR 172 concurrency
Sedgwick	16.9	27.2	SR 172 north (North Sedgwick Road) – Blue Hill	Southern terminus of SR 172
Sedgwick	20.3	32.7	SR 15 south (Byards Point Road) – Deer Isle	Eastern end of SR 15 concurrency
Brooksville–Sedgwick line	23.2	37.3	SR 15 north (Snows Cove Road) / Old Country Road – Blue Hill, Penobscot	Western end of SR 15 concurrency
Brooksville	23.8	38.3	SR 176 east (Coastal Road) – South Brooksville, Holbrook Island Sanctuary	Western terminus of SR 176
Brooksville	27.9	44.9	SR 176 west (Coastal Road) – South Brooksville, North Brooksville	Eastern end of SR 176 concurrency
Sedgwick	29.0	46.7	SR 176 east (Southern Bay Road) – Blue Hill	Western end of SR 176 concurrency
Penobscot	32.8	52.8	SR 177 east (Western County Road) – Blue Hill	Western terminus of SR 177
Penobscot	33.8	54.4	SR 199 north (North Penobscot Road) – North Penobscot	Eastern end of SR 199 concurrency
Penobscot	35.8	57.6	SR 199 south (Dunbar Road) – Castine	Western end of SR 199 concurrency
Penobscot	37.8	60.8	SR 166 (Castine Road) – Castine, Orland	
1.000 mi = 1.609 km; 1.000 km = 0.621 mi: Concurrency terminus
