= Maine State Route 178 =

State highway in Penobscot County, Maine, US

State Route 178

Route information
- Maintained by MaineDOT
- Length: 13.30 mi (21.40 km)
- Existed: 1925–present

Major junctions
- South end: SR 9 Bus. / State Street in Brewer
- SR 9 Bus. in Eddington
- North end: US 2 in Milford

Location
- Country: United States
- State: Maine
- Counties: Penobscot

Highway system
- Maine State Highway System; Interstate; US; State; Auto trails; Lettered highways
← SR 177	→ SR 179

State Route 178 (SR 178) is part of Maine's system of numbered state highways, located along the east side of the Penobscot River northeast of Bangor. It runs from State Street in Brewer (where it is concurrent with SR 9 Business) north to Milford where it terminates at U.S Route 2 (US 2) just east of Old Town.

== Route description ==
SR 178 begins in the south in Brewer, at the intersection of North Main Street (SR 9 Bus.) and State Street. It begins overlapped with SR 9 Business. The two routes proceed concurrently along the Penobscot River for four miles (6.4 km) towards Eddington. After crossing the town line, SR 178 splits to the north while SR 9 Bus. (also known as Airline Highway on this stretch) continues east.

SR 178 continues northward along the river, passing through the town of Bradley before reaching Milford where it terminates at US 2 (which crosses the river from Old Town, just to the west).

== History ==
=== Southern terminus in Brewer ===
The southern terminus of SR 178 is somewhat strange in that it is not located at an intersection with another numbered route; SR 178 instead ends at State Street, while SR 9B continues on North Main Street for one block towards modern US 1A.

State Street was, in the past, part of a numbered highway - US 1A Business. This business route, which has since been decommissioned, was designated in 1955 over what used to be US 1 Business, and US 1A before that, meaning SR 178 has historically terminated at one of these routes. When these historical designation(s) were removed, SR 178's terminus was never moved, and thus it now terminates along SR 9B one block north of its terminus with US 1A.

SR 9 ran concurrently with SR 178 until June 2025, when SR 9 was rerouted onto its new bypass of Brewer. The segment of SR 9 that ran concurrent with SR 178 became SR 9 Business.

== Major junctions ==
The entire route is in Penobscot County.

Location	mi	km	Destinations	Notes
Brewer	0.00	0.00	SR 9 Bus. west (North Main Street) to US 1A / SR 15 Bus. / I-395 / State Street – Ellsworth, Bar Harbor	Southern end of SR 9B/178 concurrency
Eddington	4.09	6.58	SR 9 Bus. east (Airline Road) – Calais	Northern end of SR 9B/178 concurrency
Milford	13.30	21.40	US 2 (Main Road) – Old Town, Lincoln	
1.000 mi = 1.609 km; 1.000 km = 0.621 mi: Concurrency terminus
