= Bingham (CDP), Maine =

Bingham, Maine
- Census-designated place
- Location within Maine Location within the United States
- Coordinates: 45°03′31″N 69°52′42″W
- Country: United States
- State: Maine
- County: Somerset

Area
  - Total: 2.26 sq mi (5.85 km^{2})
  - Land: 2.26 sq mi (5.85 km^{2})
  - Water: 0 sq mi (0.00 km^{2})
- Elevation: 430 ft (130 m)

Population (2020)
  - Total: 716
  - Density: 316.8/sq mi (122.33/km^{2})
- Time zone: UTC-5 (Eastern (EST))
  - Summer (DST): UTC-4 (EDT)
- ZIP code: 04920
- Area code: 207
- FIPS code: 23-04965
- GNIS feature ID: 2377890

Bingham is a census-designated place (CDP) in the town of Bingham in Somerset County, Maine, United States. The population was 856 at the 2000 census.

== Geography ==
Bingham is located at 45°3′25″N 69°52′54″W (45.057118, −69.88187).

According to the United States Census Bureau, the CDP has a total area of 2.5 square miles (6.4 km^{2}), all land.

== Demographics ==
Historical population
Census	Pop.	Note	%±
2020	716		—
U.S. Decennial Census

As of the census of 2000, there were 856 people, 368 households, and 230 families residing in the CDP. The population density was 347.9 inhabitants per square mile (134.3/km^{2}). There were 487 housing units at an average density of 197.9 per square mile (76.4/km^{2}). The racial makeup of the CDP was 99.30% White, 0.12% Native American, 0.12% Asian, 0.23% from other races, and 0.23% from two or more races. Hispanic or Latino of any race were 0.47% of the population.

There were 368 households, out of which 26.9% had children under the age of 18 living with them, 45.1% were married couples living together, 12.2% had a female householder with no husband present, and 37.5% were non-families. 29.9% of all households were made up of individuals, and 14.1% had someone living alone who was 65 years of age or older. The average household size was 2.26 and the average family size was 2.77.

In the CDP, the population was spread out, with 22.3% under the age of 18, 7.0% from 18 to 24, 26.3% from 25 to 44, 23.0% from 45 to 64, and 21.4% who were 65 years of age or older. The median age was 41 years. For every 100 females, there were 91.5 males. For every 100 females age 18 and over, there were 91.6 males.

The median income for a household in the CDP was $26,500, and the median income for a family was $29,950. Males had a median income of $25,795 versus $17,083 for females. The per capita income for the CDP was $13,849. About 18.8% of families and 22.4% of the population were below the poverty line, including 36.8% of those under age 18 and 9.9% of those age 65 or over.
