= East Orland, Maine =

- Village
- Location within Maine
- Coordinates: 44°34′00″N 68°40′47″W
- Country: United States
- State: Maine
- County: Hancock
- Town: Orland
- Elevation: 161 ft (49 m)
- Time zone: UTC-5 (Eastern (EST))
  - Summer (DST): UTC-4 (EDT)
- ZIP code: 04431
- Area code: 207
- GNIS feature ID: 565647

East Orland is an unincorporated village in the town of Orland, Hancock County, Maine, United States. The community is located along U.S. Route 1, 12.8 miles (20.6 km) west of Ellsworth. East Orland has a post office, with ZIP code 04431.
