= Maine State Route 177 =

State highway in Hancock County, Maine, US

State Route 177

Route information
- Maintained by MaineDOT
- Length: 6.99 mi (11.25 km)
- Existed: 1957–present

Major junctions
- West end: SR 175 in Penobscot
- East end: SR 15 / SR 172 / SR 176 in Blue Hill

Location
- Country: United States
- State: Maine
- Counties: Hancock

Highway system
- Maine State Highway System; Interstate; US; State; Auto trails; Lettered highways
← SR 176	→ SR 178

State Route 177 (SR 177) is part of Maine's system of numbered state highways, located in Hancock County. It runs from SR 175 in Penobscot to SR 15, SR 172, and SR 176 in Blue Hill. The route is seven miles (11 km) long.

== Route description ==
SR 177 begins at SR 175 in Penobscot. The route heads east towards the intersections with Tamworth Farm Road and Hinckley Ridge Road. SR 177 follows Hinckley Ridge Road south towards the intersection with Union Street and Beech Hill Road. Then, the route follows Union Street towards its eastern terminus at Blue Hill.

== Major junctions ==
The entire route is in Hancock County.

Location	mi	km	Destinations	Notes
Penobscot	0.00	0.00	SR 175 (Southern Bay Road)	
Blue Hill	6.99	11.25	SR 15 / SR 172 / SR 176 (Main Street) / Water Street – Ellsworth, Sedgwick	
1.000 mi = 1.609 km; 1.000 km = 0.621 mi
