= Bagaduce River =

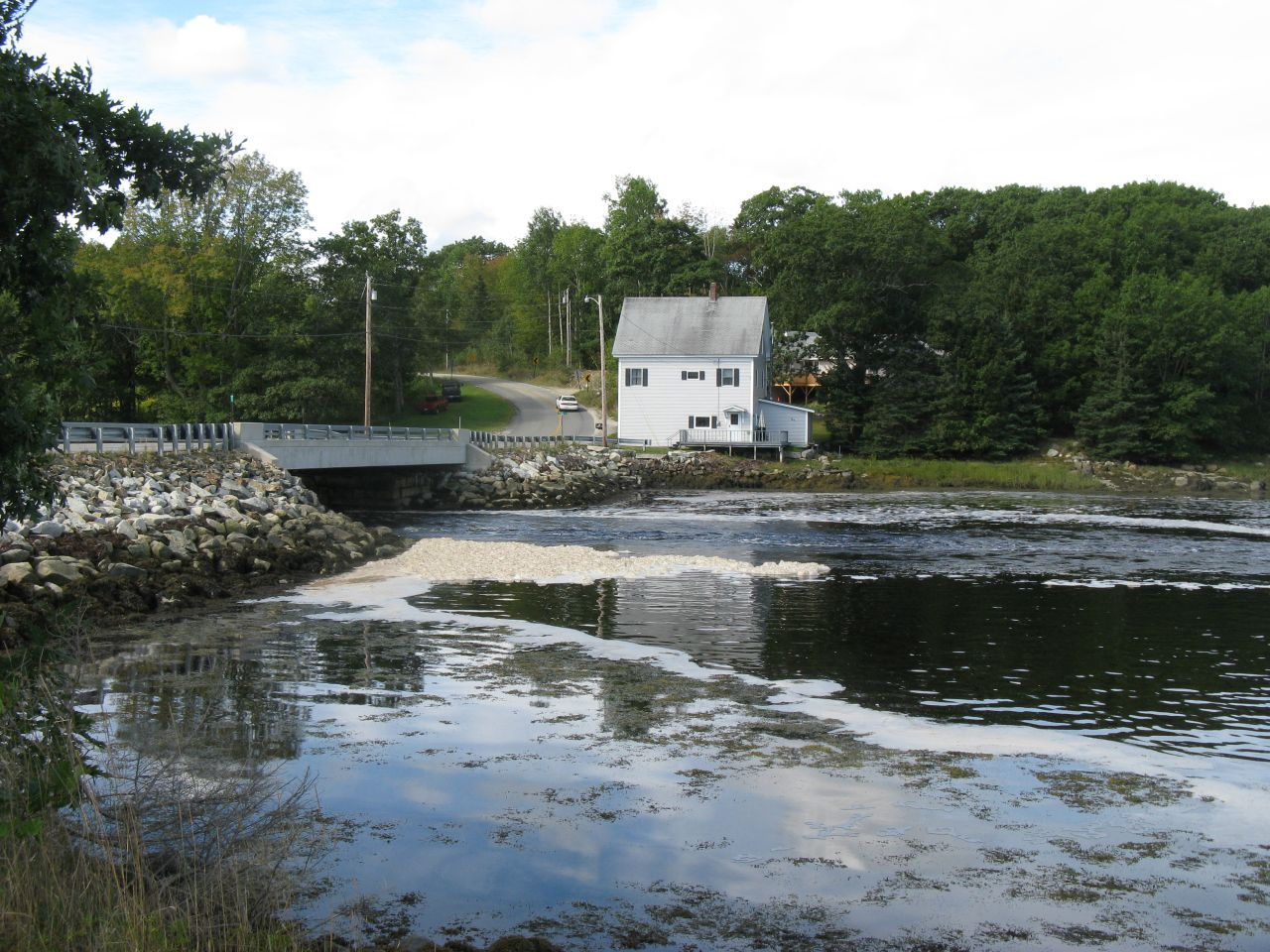
- ME Route 175/176 crosses the Bagaduce River

Location
- Country: United States

Physical characteristics
- Source
  - location: Maine
- Mouth
  - location: Penobscot Bay
  - coordinates: 44°22′37″N 68°48′50″W
  - elevation: sea level
- Length: 14 mi (23 km)

The Bagaduce River is a tidal river in the Hancock County, Maine that empties into Penobscot Bay near the town of Castine. From the confluence of Black Brook and the outflow of Walker Pond (44°21′16″N 68°40′41″W), the river runs about 14 miles (23 km) north, northwest, and southwest, forming the border between Brooksville on its left bank and Sedgwick, Penobscot, and Castine on its right.

In 2014, residents of Penobscot raised concerns over the rapidly growing oyster farming on the Bagaduce River.

== See also ==
- List of rivers of Maine
