= Bucksport (CDP), Maine =

Bucksport, Maine
- Census-designated place
- Location within Maine Location within the United States
- Coordinates: 44°36′22″N 68°47′40″W
- Country: United States
- State: Maine
- County: Hancock
- Town: Bucksport

Area
  - Total: 14.54 sq mi (37.67 km^{2})
  - Land: 11.41 sq mi (29.56 km^{2})
  - Water: 3.13 sq mi (8.11 km^{2})
- Elevation: 177 ft (54 m)

Population (2020)
  - Total: 2,832
  - Density: 248.1/sq mi (95.81/km^{2})
- Time zone: UTC-5 (Eastern (EST))
  - Summer (DST): UTC-4 (EDT)
- ZIP code: 04416
- Area code: 207
- FIPS code: 23-08780
- GNIS feature ID: 2377895

Bucksport is a census-designated place (CDP) in the town of Bucksport in Hancock County, Maine, United States. The population was 2,885 at the 2010 census, down from 2,970 at the 2000 census.

== Geography ==
The Bucksport CDP is the primary settlement in the town of Bucksport and is located in the southwestern part of the town limits. The western border of the CDP follows the Bucksport town line (and Hancock–Waldo County line) down the middle of the Penobscot River. The southern border follows the center of the Eastern Channel of the Penobscot, which separates Bucksport from the town of Verona Island. The southeastern border of the CDP follows the Bucksport–Orland town line, then follows Maine State Route 46 northeast to Russell Hill Road. The CDP border continues north and west, following Russell Hill Road, Bucksmills Road, Millvale Road, Cross Road, Silver Lake Road, and Town Farm Road to Maine State Route 15 at Bucksport Center. The border follows ME 15 north to an unnamed brook, then runs downstream (west) to the Penobscot.

U.S. Route 1 passes through the southeastern corner of Bucksport, entering the CDP from the south on a bridge from Verona Island and leaving east into Orland. US-1 leads east 19 miles (31 km) to Ellsworth and southwestward 18 miles (29 km) to Belfast. Maine Route 15 follows Main Street through the center of Bucksport and leads north up the Penobscot 19 miles to Bangor.

According to the United States Census Bureau, the Bucksport CDP has a total area of 14.6 square miles (37.7 km^{2}), of which 11.4 square miles (29.6 km^{2}) are land and 3.1 square miles (8.1 km^{2}), or 21.54%, are water.

== Demographics ==
Historical population
| Census | Pop. | Note | %± |
|---|---|---|---|
| 2020 | 2,832 | | — |
U.S. Decennial Census

As of the census of 2000, there were 2,970 people, 1,296 households, and 804 families residing in the CDP. The population density was 260.8 inhabitants per square mile (100.7/km^{2}). There were 1,381 housing units at an average density of 121.3 per square mile (46.8/km^{2}). The racial makeup of the CDP was 97.41% White, 0.03% Black or African American, 0.44% Native American, 0.27% Asian, 0.07% Pacific Islander, 0.13% from other races, and 1.65% from two or more races. Hispanic or Latino of any race were 1.14% of the population.

There were 1,296 households, out of which 30.1% had children under the age of 18 living with them, 46.5% were married couples living together, 11.7% had a female householder with no husband present, and 37.9% were non-families. 31.7% of all households were made up of individuals, and 14.7% had someone living alone who was 65 years of age or older. The average household size was 2.26 and the average family size was 2.82.

In the CDP, the population was spread out, with 24.2% under the age of 18, 8.4% from 18 to 24, 27.5% from 25 to 44, 24.1% from 45 to 64, and 15.8% who were 65 years of age or older. The median age was 39 years. For every 100 females, there were 90.1 males. For every 100 females age 18 and over, there were 81.0 males.

The median income for a household in the CDP was $34,402, and the median income for a family was $46,435. Males had a median income of $35,739 versus $24,541 for females. The per capita income for the CDP was $18,179. About 11.2% of families and 11.8% of the population were below the poverty line, including 11.8% of those under age 18 and 7.8% of those age 65 or over.
