= Greenville Junction, Maine =

- Village
- Location within Maine
- Coordinates: 45°27′39″N 69°36′58″W
- Country: United States
- State: Maine
- County: Piscataquis
- Elevation: 1,040 ft (320 m)
- Time zone: UTC-5 (Eastern (EST))
  - Summer (DST): UTC-4 (EDT)
- ZIP code: 04442
- Area code: 207
- GNIS feature ID: 567304

Greenville Junction is an unincorporated village in the town of Greenville, Maine, United States. The community is located along Maine State Route 6 and the south shore of Moosehead Lake, 27 miles (43 km) northwest of Dover-Foxcroft. Greenville Junction has a post office, with ZIP code 04442.
