= Cooper, Maine =

Town in Maine, United States

- Town
- Location within Maine Location within the United States
- Coordinates: 44°59′50″N 67°26′21″W
- Country: United States
- State: Maine
- County: Washington

Area
  - Total: 32.57 sq mi (84.36 km^{2})
  - Land: 30.71 sq mi (79.54 km^{2})
  - Water: 1.86 sq mi (4.82 km^{2})
- Elevation: 345 ft (105 m)

Population (2020)
  - Total: 168
  - Density: 5.4/sq mi (2.1/km^{2})
- Time zone: UTC-5 (Eastern (EST))
  - Summer (DST): UTC-4 (EDT)
- ZIP code: 04657
- Area code: 207
- FIPS code: 23-14100
- GNIS feature ID: 582417
- Website: www.coopermaine.com

Cooper is a town in Washington County, Maine, United States. The community was named after General John Cooper, a landowner. The population was 168 at the 2020 census.

== Geography ==
According to the United States Census Bureau, the town has a total area of 32.57 square miles (84.36 km^{2}), of which 30.71 square miles (79.54 km^{2}) is land and 1.86 square miles (4.82 km^{2}) is water.

== Demographics ==
Historical population
Census	Pop.	Note	%±
1830	396		—
1840	657		65.9%
1850	562		−14.5%
1860	468		−16.7%
1870	360		−23.1%
1880	346		−3.9%
1890	264		−23.7%
1900	207		−21.6%
1910	190		−8.2%
1920	197		3.7%
1930	153		−22.3%
1940	178		16.3%
1950	128		−28.1%
1960	106		−17.2%
1970	88		−17.0%
1980	105		19.3%
1990	124		18.1%
2000	145		16.9%
2010	154		6.2%
2020	168		9.1%
U.S. Decennial Census

=== 2010 census ===
As of the census of 2010, there were 154 people, 66 households, and 47 families living in the town. The population density was 5.0 inhabitants per square mile (1.9/km^{2}). There were 167 housing units at an average density of 5.4 per square mile (2.1/km^{2}). The racial makeup of the town was 98.1% White, 0.6% African American, and 1.3% Native American. Hispanic or Latino of any race were 0.6% of the population.

There were 66 households, of which 21.2% had children under the age of 18 living with them, 62.1% were married couples living together, 6.1% had a female householder with no husband present, 3.0% had a male householder with no wife present, and 28.8% were non-families. 19.7% of all households were made up of individuals, and 6% had someone living alone who was 65 years of age or older. The average household size was 2.33 and the average family size was 2.70.

The median age in the town was 51.6 years. 16.9% of residents were under the age of 18; 5.7% were between the ages of 18 and 24; 16.8% were from 25 to 44; 40.3% were from 45 to 64; and 20.1% were 65 years of age or older. The gender makeup of the town was 51.3% male and 48.7% female.

=== 2000 census ===
As of the census of 2000, there were 145 people, 56 households, and 42 families living in the town. The population density was 4.7 inhabitants per square mile (1.8/km^{2}). There were 160 housing units at an average density of 5.1 per square mile (2.0/km^{2}). The racial makeup of the town was 96.55% White, 1.38% African American, 0.69% Asian, and 1.38% from two or more races.

There were 56 households, out of which 33.9% had children under the age of 18 living with them, 60.7% were married couples living together, 3.6% had a female householder with no husband present, and 25.0% were non-families. 19.6% of all households were made up of individuals, and 5.4% had someone living alone who was 65 years of age or older. The average household size was 2.59 and the average family size was 2.93.

In the town, the population was spread out, with 24.8% under the age of 18, 6.9% from 18 to 24, 29.0% from 25 to 44, 26.9% from 45 to 64, and 12.4% who were 65 years of age or older. The median age was 40 years. For every 100 females, there were 93.3 males. For every 100 females age 18 and over, there were 105.7 males.

The median income for a household in the town was $33,125, and the median income for a family was $41,042. Males had a median income of $26,563 versus $30,417 for females. The per capita income for the town was $14,353. There were 5.4% of families and 8.8% of the population living below the poverty line, including no under eighteens and 9.5% of those over 64.
