= Sargentville, Maine =

- Village
- Location within Maine
- Coordinates: 44°18′05″N 68°40′21″W
- Country: United States
- State: Maine
- County: Hancock
- Town: Sedgwick
- Elevation: 115 ft (35 m)
- Time zone: UTC-5 (Eastern (EST))
  - Summer (DST): UTC-4 (EDT)
- ZIP code: 04673
- Area code: 207
- GNIS feature ID: 574928

Sargentville is an unincorporated village in the town of Sedgwick, Hancock County, Maine, United States. The community is located along Maine State Route 175, 21 miles (34 km) southwest of Ellsworth. Sargentville had a post office from February 10, 1855, until April 23, 2005; it still has its own ZIP code, 04673.
