= Orland, Maine =

Town in Maine, United States

- Town
- Seal

- Location within Maine Location within the United States
- Coordinates: 44°34′38″N 68°40′40″W
- Country: United States
- State: Maine
- County: Hancock
- Villages: Orland; East Orland; South Orland

Area
  - Total: 52.87 sq mi (136.93 km^{2})
  - Land: 47.04 sq mi (121.83 km^{2})
  - Water: 5.83 sq mi (15.10 km^{2})
- Elevation: 269 ft (82 m)

Population (2020)
  - Total: 2,221
  - Density: 47/sq mi (18.2/km^{2})
- Time zone: UTC-5 (Eastern (EST))
  - Summer (DST): UTC-4 (EDT)
- ZIP Codes: 04472 (Orland); 04431 (East Orland)
- Area code: 207
- FIPS code: 23-55505
- GNIS feature ID: 582650
- Website: townoforland.org

Orland is a town in Hancock County, Maine, United States. The population was 2,221 at the 2020 census.

== Geography ==
According to the United States Census Bureau, the town has a total area of 52.87 square miles (136.93 km^{2}), of which 47.04 square miles (121.83 km^{2}) is land and 5.83 square miles (15.10 km^{2}) is water.

== Demographics ==
Historical population
Census	Pop.	Note	%±
1800	294		—
1810	480		63.3%
1820	610		27.1%
1830	975		59.8%
1840	1,381		41.6%
1850	1,579		14.3%
1860	1,787		13.2%
1870	1,701		−4.8%
1880	1,689		−0.7%
1890	1,390		−17.7%
1900	1,251		−10.0%
1910	1,224		−2.2%
1920	910		−25.7%
1930	891		−2.1%
1940	1,015		13.9%
1950	1,155		13.8%
1960	1,195		3.5%
1970	1,307		9.4%
1980	1,645		25.9%
1990	1,805		9.7%
2000	2,134		18.2%
2010	2,225		4.3%
2020	2,221		−0.2%
U.S. Decennial Census

=== 2010 census ===
At the 2010 census there were 2,225 people, 976 households, and 627 families living in the town. The population density was 47.3 inhabitants per square mile (18.3/km^{2}). There were 1,470 housing units at an average density of 31.3 per square mile (12.1/km^{2}). The racial makeup of the town was 97.3% White, 0.1% African American, 0.5% Native American, 0.3% Asian, 0.5% from other races, and 1.3% from two or more races. Hispanic or Latino of any race were 1.2%.

Of the 976 households 24.3% had children under the age of 18 living with them, 50.7% were married couples living together, 9.0% had a female householder with no husband present, 4.5% had a male householder with no wife present, and 35.8% were non-families. 27.9% of households were one person and 8% were one person aged 65 or older. The average household size was 2.25 and the average family size was 2.70.

The median age in the town was 47.3 years. 17.3% of residents were under the age of 18; 7.9% were between the ages of 18 and 24; 20.5% were from 25 to 44; 38.5% were from 45 to 64; and 15.7% were 65 or older. The gender makeup of the town was 50.0% male and 50.0% female.

=== 2000 census ===
At the 2000 census there were 2,127 people, 867 households, and 630 families living in the town. The population density was 45.5 inhabitants per square mile (17.6/km^{2}). There were 1,253 housing units at an average density of 26.7 per square mile (10.3/km^{2}). The racial makeup of the town was 98.27% White, 0.14% Native American, 0.23% Asian, 0.09% from other races, and 1.27% from two or more races. Hispanic or Latino of any race were 0.37%.

Of the 880 households 31.5% had children under the age of 18 living with them, 57.4% were married couples living together, 9.7% had a female householder with no husband present, and 28.4% were non-families. 22.2% of households were one person and 6.5% were one person aged 65 or older. The average household size was 2.42 and the average family size was 2.82.

The age distribution was 24.0% under the age of 18, 5.7% from 18 to 24, 29.6% from 25 to 44, 27.8% from 45 to 64, and 12.8% 65 or older. The median age was 40 years. For every 100 females, there were 98.9 males. For every 100 females age 18 and over, there were 92.3 males.

The median household income was $39,345 and the median family income was $45,875. Males had a median income of $36,435 versus $23,571 for females. The per capita income for the town was $19,551. About 8.5% of families and 11.2% of the population were below the poverty line, including 18.3% of those under age 18 and 4.2% of those age 65 or over.

== Notable people ==
- Phinehas Barnes (1811–1871), newspaper editor and state legislator
- Walter Van Tilburg Clark, author and poet, best known for the novel The Oxbow Incident
- Edwin Ginn, publisher, peace advocate, philanthropist
- Samuel Harriman, Union Army Brigadier General

== Town government ==
Selectmen/Town Meeting
