= Penobscot, Maine =

Town in Maine, United States

- Town
- Seal

- Location within Maine Location within the United States
- Coordinates: 44°28′50″N 68°42′45″W
- Country: United States
- State: Maine
- County: Hancock
- Villages: Penobscot; North Penobscot; South Penobscot; West Penobscot

Area
  - Total: 46.55 sq mi (120.56 km^{2})
  - Land: 39.87 sq mi (103.26 km^{2})
  - Water: 6.68 sq mi (17.30 km^{2})
- Elevation: 85 ft (26 m)

Population (2020)
  - Total: 1,136
  - Density: 28/sq mi (11/km^{2})
- Time zone: UTC-5 (Eastern (EST))
  - Summer (DST): UTC-4 (EDT)
- ZIP code: 04476
- Area code: 207
- FIPS code: 23-57920
- GNIS feature ID: 582668
- Website: penobscotmaine.org

Penobscot is a town in Hancock County, Maine, United States. The Bagaduce River flows through the town. The population was 1,136 at the 2020 census.

== Geography ==
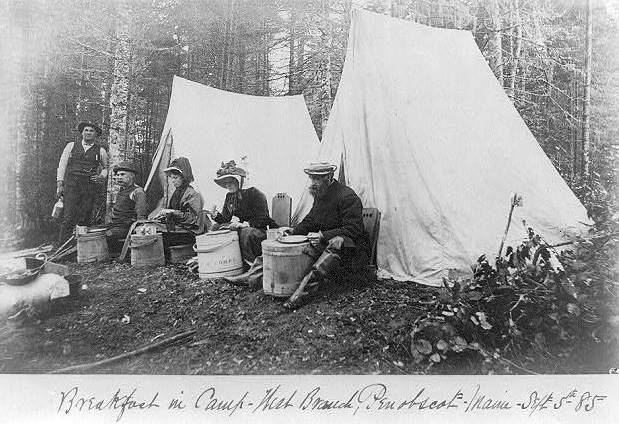
Breakfast in camp, Penobscot, September 1885.

According to the United States Census Bureau, the town has a total area of 46.55 square miles (120.56 km^{2}), of which 39.87 square miles (103.26 km^{2}) is land and 6.68 square miles (17.30 km^{2}) is water.

== Demographics ==
Historical population
| Census | Pop. | Note | %± |
|---|---|---|---|
| 1790 | 1,048 | | — |
| 1800 | 935 | | −10.8% |
| 1810 | 1,302 | | 39.3% |
| 1820 | 1,009 | | −22.5% |
| 1830 | 1,271 | | 26.0% |
| 1840 | 1,474 | | 16.0% |
| 1850 | 1,556 | | 5.6% |
| 1860 | 1,557 | | 0.1% |
| 1870 | 1,418 | | −8.9% |
| 1880 | 1,341 | | −5.4% |
| 1890 | 1,313 | | −2.1% |
| 1900 | 1,156 | | −12.0% |
| 1910 | 985 | | −14.8% |
| 1920 | 870 | | −11.7% |
| 1930 | 708 | | −18.6% |
| 1940 | 680 | | −4.0% |
| 1950 | 699 | | 2.8% |
| 1960 | 706 | | 1.0% |
| 1970 | 786 | | 11.3% |
| 1980 | 1,104 | | 40.5% |
| 1990 | 1,131 | | 2.4% |
| 2000 | 1,344 | | 18.8% |
| 2010 | 1,263 | | −6.0% |
| 2020 | 1,136 | | −10.1% |
U.S. Decennial Census

=== 2010 census ===
As of the census of 2010, there were 1,263 people, 593 households, and 347 families living in the town. The population density was 31.7 inhabitants per square mile (12.2/km^{2}). There were 883 housing units at an average density of 22.1 per square mile (8.5/km^{2}). The racial makeup of the town was 97.5% White, 0.2% African American, 0.4% Native American, 0.6% Asian, 0.2% from other races, and 1.2% from two or more races. Hispanic or Latino of any race were 1.0% of the population.

There were 593 households, of which 18.9% had children under the age of 18 living with them, 48.7% were married couples living together, 5.9% had a female householder with no husband present, 3.9% had a male householder with no wife present, and 41.5% were non-families. 32.4% of all households were made up of individuals, and 16.2% had someone living alone who was 65 years of age or older. The average household size was 2.06 and the average family size was 2.57.

The median age in the town was 51.9 years. 14.8% of residents were under the age of 18; 6.1% were between the ages of 18 and 24; 19% were from 25 to 44; 33.9% were from 45 to 64; and 26.1% were 65 years of age or older. The gender makeup of the town was 48.7% male and 51.3% female.

=== 2000 census ===
As of the census of 2000, there were 1,344 people, 533 households, and 370 families living in the town. The population density was 33.7 inhabitants per square mile (13.0/km^{2}). There were 723 housing units at an average density of 18.1 per square mile (7.0/km^{2}). The racial makeup of the town was 98.07% White, 0.15% African American, 0.37% Native American, 0.30% Asian, 0.30% from other races, and 0.82% from two or more races. Hispanic or Latino of any race were 0.45% of the population.

There were 533 households, out of which 27.6% had children under the age of 18 living with them, 60.0% were married couples living together, 7.1% had a female householder with no husband present, and 30.4% were non-families. 24.0% of all households were made up of individuals, and 11.3% had someone living alone who was 65 years of age or older. The average household size was 2.36 and the average family size was 2.79.

In the town, the population was spread out, with 20.3% under the age of 18, 5.0% from 18 to 24, 25.4% from 25 to 44, 27.5% from 45 to 64, and 21.8% who were 65 years of age or older. The median age was 45 years. For every 100 females, there were 94.8 males. For every 100 females age 18 and over, there were 89.9 males.

The median income for a household in the town was $37,232, and the median income for a family was $42,368. Males had a median income of $30,921 versus $22,417 for females. The per capita income for the town was $20,035. About 4.0% of families and 8.0% of the population were below the poverty line, including 12.5% of those under age 18 and 10.5% of those age 65 or over.

== Education ==
The community is in the Penobscot School District. Penobscot Community School is the public K-8 school of the town. It is in School Union 93.

Penobscot pays George Stevens Academy, a private school, to educate its students at the high school level. At one point Penobscot had its own high school, but it closed, with students moved to GSA.
