= Maine State Route 179 =

State highway in Hancock County, Maine, US

State Route 179

Route information
- Maintained by MaineDOT
- Length: 22.28 mi (35.86 km)

Major junctions
- South end: US 1A in Ellsworth
- North end: SR 9 in Aurora

Location
- Country: United States
- State: Maine
- Counties: Hancock

Highway system
- Maine State Highway System; Interstate; US; State; Auto trails; Lettered highways
| ← SR 178 | → SR 180 |

State Route 179 (SR 179) is a state highway in the U.S. state of Maine. It runs entirely in Hancock County for a distance of 22 miles (35 km) between Ellsworth and Aurora.

== Route description ==
SR 179 begins at a skewed intersection with U.S. Route 1A (US 1A) about 1.6 miles (2.6 km) northwest of downtown Ellsworth, but still within the city limits. Within the small commercialized settlement of Ellsworth Falls, SR 179 immediately crosses a disused railroad and a new rail trail past the US 1A intersection. It heads northwest past a church and then sharply bends to the north. At this point, houses and woods line both sides of the road. At Mariaville Road (formerly SR 180 which also used to continue south on a concurrency with SR 179 to US 1A until 2013), the road bends to the northeast and begins to follow the eastern shoreline of Graham Lake. It briefly enters the unorganized territory of Central Hancock before entering the town of Waltham. Houses are sparse along this stretch of the highway as most of the surrounding area is forest. It reaches the northern terminus of SR 200 near the center of the town.

North of SR 200, SR 179 heads north and slowly climbs into the Waltham Ridge while some houses and small farms line the road. Near the summit of the hill, the road curves to the northeast and begins to descend from the ridge. Approaching the East Branch Union River, it descends quicker until reaching the river upon which the road enters the town of Mariaville. The road name becomes Tourtelotte Ridge Road upon entering Mariaville; it then begins to ascend hill of the same name passing through forest along the way. It reaches a small clearing at the top of the ridge and curves to the northeast to begin descending the hill. SR 179 clips the northwest corner of Osborn; while in the town, it passes several houses and small farm houses. It also passes to the west of Moose Hill's summit though the road does climb part of the way up the mountain. SR 179 then enters Aurora passing over rolling hills, traveling west of Giles Pond, and heading through a mix of cleared and wooded areas. The road ends at Airline Road, SR 9 in Aurora.

== Major junctions ==
The entire route is in Hancock County.

| Location | mi | km | Destinations | Notes |
|---|---|---|---|---|
| Ellsworth | 0.00 | 0.00 | US 1A (Bangor Road) to SR 180 – Ellsworth, Bangor | |
| Waltham | 10.97 | 17.65 | SR 200 south – Eastbrook, Franklin | Northern terminus of SR 200 |
| Aurora | 22.28 | 35.86 | SR 9 (Airline Road) – Amherst, Aurora | |
1.000 mi = 1.609 km; 1.000 km = 0.621 mi
