= Maine State Route 180 =

North-south state highway in Maine, US

State Route 180

Route information
- Maintained by MaineDOT
- Length: 20.1 mi (32.3 km)

Major junctions
- South end: US 1A in Ellsworth
- SR 181 near Mariaville
- North end: SR 9 near Eddington

Location
- Country: United States
- State: Maine
- Counties: Penobscot, Hancock

Highway system
- Maine State Highway System; Interstate; US; State; Auto trails; Lettered highways
← SR 179	→ SR 181

State Route 180 (SR 180) is a 20.1-mile-long (32.3 km) state highway in the U.S. state of Maine traveling from U.S. Route 1A (US 1A) in Ellsworth to SR 9 near Eddington.

== Route description ==
SR 180 begins at an intersection with US 1A about two and a half miles (4.0 km) northwest of downtown Ellsworth. It travels north along Wittum Road through a light industrial park before heading into a more wooded area paralleling the Union River on its west bank. About one and a half miles (2.4 km) from here, it meets Mariaville Road, a former alignment of SR 180, and travels along the west shore of Graham Lake passing small houses along the way. It crosses the outlet from Green Lake where the Green Lake National Fish Hatchery, operated by the United States Fish and Wildlife Service, is located. As it nears the Ellsworth–Otis corporate line, SR 180 passes to the east of Hopkins Hill. Upon entering the town of Otis, the road passes through a small settlement titled Fletchers Lodge where a general store and an elementary school are located. Numerous roads towards the west lead to Beech Hill Pond. In this area, SR 180 meets the southern terminus of SR 181 (Mariaville Road) which heads north towards Mariaville.

North of SR 181, SR 180's route becomes more winding and heading in a more northwesterly direction. After passing the settlement of Otis, makes additional curves including a sharp curve to the north at Rocky Nubble Road. The road leaves Hancock County and passes into Penobscot County within the town of Clifton. Shortly after the county line, the road crosses the summit of Rebel Hill (elevation 664 feet (202 m)) and descends passing between other hills. As the road begins to flatten in grade, some houses dot the sides of the road before SR 180 enters the community of Clifton Corners and ends at SR 9.

== History ==
When highway was first designated, SR 180's southern terminus was at the same location as SR 179's southern terminus at US 1A in Ellsworth. The two roads had a 1.6-mile-long (2.6 km) concurrency before SR 180 split towards the west and SR 179 continuing along the east shore of Graham Lake towards Waltham. SR 180 crossed the Union River just downstream of the dam holding back Graham Lake before it curved to the north and follows what is now its current alignment. In 2007, the bridge that carried SR 180 received a failing grade based on an inspection of the bridge. As a temporary measure, the Maine Department of Transportation constructed a single-lane Bailey bridge on top of the existing structure.

Construction started on the 1.5-mile-long (2.4 km) realignment of SR 180 in 2012. The new road, which required the construction of a small bridge over Grey's Brook, opened on July 29, 2013, about three months ahead of schedule. The former route between SR 179 and the current route became a pair of dead-end roads with the bridge being closed off.

== Major junctions ==
County	Location	mi	km	Destinations	Notes
Hancock	Ellsworth	0.0	0.0	US 1A (Bangor Road)	
Hancock	Otis	8.2	13.2	SR 181 north (Mariaville Road) – Amherst	Southern terminus of SR 181
Penobscot	Clifton	20.1	32.3	SR 9 (Airline Road) / Getchell Road – Brewer, Calais	
1.000 mi = 1.609 km; 1.000 km = 0.621 mi
