= Maine State Route 200 =

State highway in Hancock County, Maine, US

State Route 200

Route information
- Maintained by MaineDOT
- Length: 17.92 mi (28.84 km)
- Existed: 1925–present

Major junctions
- South end: US 1 in Sullivan
- SR 182 in Franklin
- North end: SR 179 in Waltham

Location
- Country: United States
- State: Maine
- Counties: Hancock

Highway system
- Maine State Highway System; Interstate; US; State; Auto trails; Lettered highways
← SR 199	→ US 201

State Route 200 (SR 200) is part of Maine's system of numbered state highways, located in Hancock County. The route runs from U.S. Route 1 (US 1) in Sullivan to SR 179 in Waltham. SR 200 is 17.92 miles (28.84 km) long and also serves the town of Eastbrook.

== Junction list ==
The entire route is in Hancock County.

Location	mi	km	Destinations	Notes
Sullivan	0.00	0.00	US 1 – Ellsworth, Machias	
Franklin	5.93	9.54	SR 182 east (Blackswoods Road) – Cherryfield	Southern end of SR 182 concurrency
Franklin	6.86	11.04	SR 182 west (West Franklin Road)	Northern end of SR 182 concurrency
Waltham	17.92	28.84	SR 179 – Ellsworth, Aurora	
1.000 mi = 1.609 km; 1.000 km = 0.621 mi: Concurrency terminus
