= Maine State Route 181 =

State highway in Hancock County, Maine, US

State Route 181
- Mariaville Road

Route information
- Maintained by MaineDOT
- Length: 12.45 mi (20.04 km)

Major junctions
- South end: SR 180 in Otis
- North end: SR 9 in Amherst

Location
- Country: United States
- State: Maine
- Counties: Hancock

Highway system
- Maine State Highway System; Interstate; US; State; Auto trails; Lettered highways
← SR 180	→ SR 182

State Route 181 (SR 181) is a 12.45-mile (20.04 km) route in the US state of Maine from SR 180 near Mariaville to SR 9 in Amherst. It serves as the main through route through Mariaville.

== Major junctions ==
The entire route is in Hancock County.

Location	mi	km	Destinations	Notes
Otis	0.00	0.00	SR 180 – Clifton, Ellsworth	
Amherst	12.45	20.04	SR 9 (Airline Road) / Tannery Road	
1.000 mi = 1.609 km; 1.000 km = 0.621 mi
