= Regional School Unit 63 =

School district in Penobscot County, Maine, United States

Other information
- Website: www.rsu63.org

Holbrook School, the district middle school, located in Holden, Maine

Regional School Unit 63 (RSU 63), formerly Maine School Administrative District 63, is an operating school district within Penobscot County, Maine, covering the towns of Holden, Eddington, and Clifton.

== Background ==
There are three schools in the district. Two are kindergarten-through-fourth grade elementary schools and are located in the towns of Holden and Eddington. The Eddington school also serves children from Clifton. The middle school is also located in Holden and services all three towns through eighth grade. It also contains CSD 8, or 'Airline', which serves the towns of Amherst, Aurora, Great Pond and Osborne. Together, these two districts are referred to as AOS 81.

Students must leave the district for high school as SAD 63 does not have one. The district pays the tuition for students to attend one of several area public and private schools. This allows area children to attend private schools that would otherwise be very costly for minimal or no cost. Most students attend the regional public school, Brewer High School, with the second most popular choice being the private John Bapst Memorial High School.
