= Middle Branch Union River =

Location
- Country: United States

Physical characteristics
- Source
  - location: Maine
- Mouth
  - location: East Branch Union River
  - coordinates: 44°47′03″N 68°17′04″W
  - elevation: 195 feet (59 m)
- Length: 14 mi (23 km)

Basin features
- Progression: E. Br. Union R. – Graham Lake – Union River – Union River Bay

The Middle Branch Union River is a river in Hancock County, Maine, United States. From the outflow of Lower Middle Branch Pond (44°51′57″N 68°13′35″W) in Aurora, the river runs 13.8 miles (22.2 km) west and south to its confluence with the East Branch of the Union River in Osborn.

== See also ==
- List of rivers of Maine
