= Maine State Route 182 =

East-west state highway in Maine, US

State Route 182

Route information
- Maintained by MaineDOT
- Length: 23.34 mi (37.56 km)

Major junctions
- West end: US 1 in Hancock
- East end: US 1 in Cherryfield

Location
- Country: United States
- State: Maine
- Counties: Hancock, Washington

Highway system
- Maine State Highway System; Interstate; US; State; Auto trails; Lettered highways
← SR 181	→ SR 183

State Route 182 (SR 182) is a state highway in the U.S. state of Maine. It connects U.S. Route 1 (US 1) at Hancock with US 1 in Cherryfield running for a distance of 23 miles (37 km). While US 1 stays to the south passing through towns along Maine's coastline, SR 182 stays inland only passing through one town, Franklin, but otherwise passes through rural forested areas.

== Route description ==
SR 182 begins in a small cluster of small commercial businesses along US 1 in Hancock. It heads northeast along Franklin Road passing houses, light industrial facilities, and wooded areas. It enters the town of Franklin passing through the settlement of Egypt. It then begins to follow the north side of the furthest reaches of Taunton Bay. After passing through the settlement of West Franklin, the road enters the town center of Franklin where SR 200 joins SR 182 for a 0.9-mile-long (1.4 km) concurrency. Through this concurrency, the road passes numerous houses, churches, and small businesses. Past the point where SR 200 heads towards the southeast, SR 182 heads northeast, first crossing the Down East Sunrise Trail (formerly the Calais Branch railroad) then passes the town's post office, a cemetery, a club, and additional houses. The road starts to curve to the east entering the unorganized territory of East Hancock. Through the unorganized territory, SR 182 winds its way around numerous lakes (including Fox Pond, Spring River Lake, and Tunk Lake) and mountains (including Otter Bog Mountain, Tunk Mountain, and Catherine Mountain). The road then enters Cherryfield, Washington County where some homes appear along the road again. After crossing the aforementioned rail trail, SR 182 makes a sweeping curve to the south bypassing a former alignment of the road which stayed closer to the Narraguagus River. The highway ends at US 1 just west of the river and the town center.

== Major junctions ==
County	Location	mi	km	Destinations	Notes
Hancock	Hancock	0.00	0.00	US 1 – Sullivan, Ellsworth	
Hancock	Franklin	5.13	8.26	SR 200 north (Eastbrook Road) – Eastbrook, Waltham	Western end of SR 200 concurrency
Hancock	Franklin	6.06	9.75	SR 200 south (Hog Bay Road) – Sullivan	Eastern end of SR 200 concurrency
Washington	Cherryfield	23.34	37.56	US 1 (Milbridge Road) – Harrington, Machias, Milbridge	
1.000 mi = 1.609 km; 1.000 km = 0.621 mi: Concurrency terminus
