= East Branch Union River =

Location
- Country: United States

Physical characteristics
- Source
  - location: Maine
- Mouth
  - location: Union River
  - coordinates: 44°43′53″N 68°22′52″W
  - elevation: 32 feet (10 m)
- Length: 21.6 mi (34.8 km)

Basin features
- Tributaries
  - left: Bog River
  - right: Middle Branch Union River

The East Branch Union River is a 21.6-mile-long (34.8 km) river in Hancock County, Maine. From the outflow of Rocky Pond (44°47′33″N 68°08′34″W) in Maine Township 22 M D, the river runs 5.3 miles (8.5 km) southwest to Spectacle Pond in Osborn. From the pond's outlet, the river runs 13.0 miles (20.9 km) northwest, southwest, west and southwest to Graham Lake, where it joins the West Branch to form the Union River. The lower section of the East Branch forms the border between Mariaville and Waltham.

== See also ==
- List of rivers of Maine
