= Ellsworth Power House and Dam =

- U.S. National Register of Historic Places
- U.S. Historic district
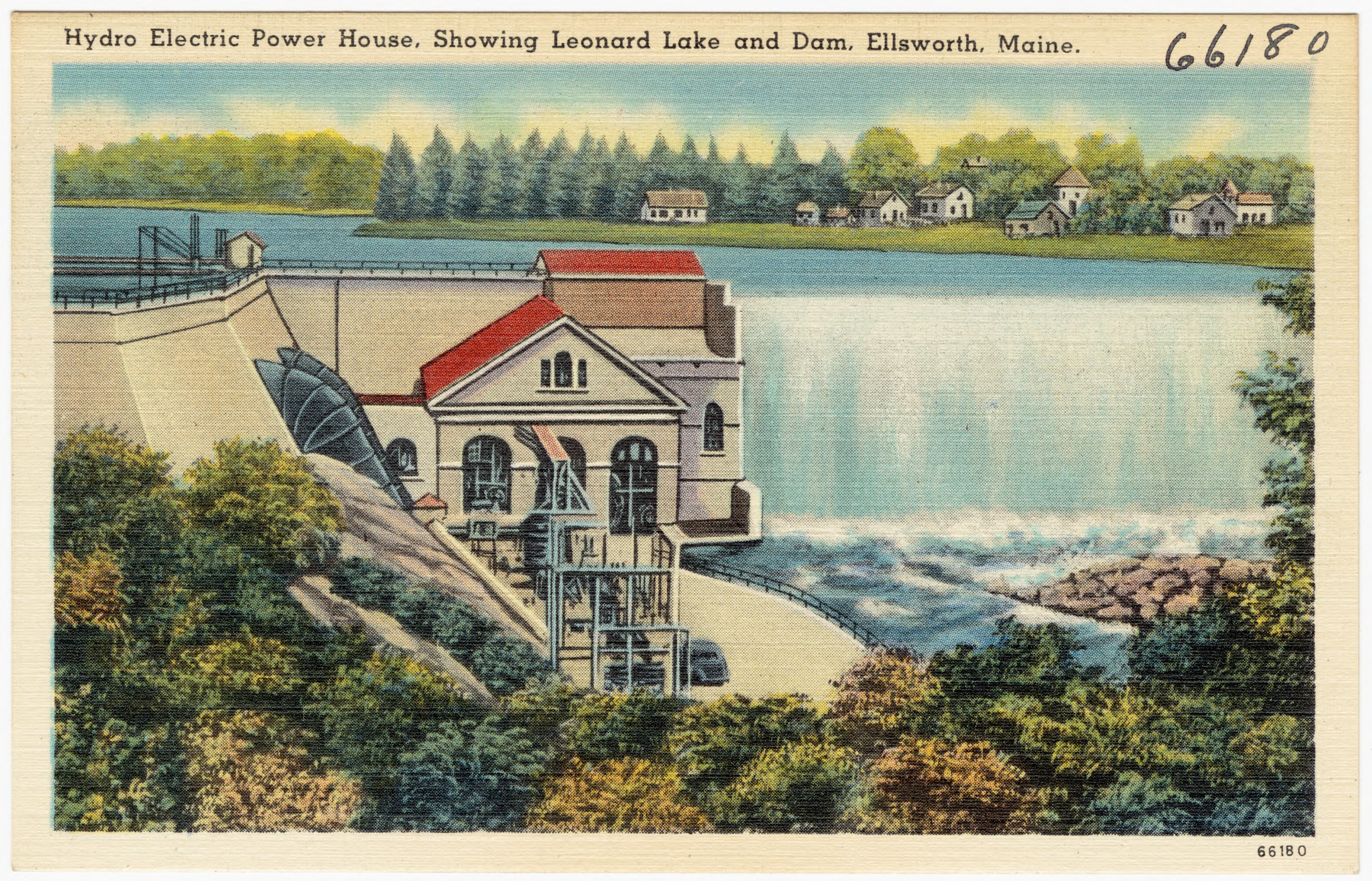

- Location within Maine Location within the United States
- Location: Union River, Ellsworth, Maine
- Coordinates: 44°32′39″N 68°25′50″W
- Area: 2 acres (0.81 ha)
- Built: 1907
- Engineer: James L. Leonard
- Architectural style: Renaissance, Ambursen type
- NRHP reference No.: 85001262
- Added to NRHP: June 20, 1985

The Ellsworth Power House and Dam is a hydroelectric power generation facility on the Union River in Ellsworth, Maine. The dam, located just north of downtown Ellsworth, is also known as the Union River Dam, and impounds the river to create Leonard Lake, named for project's engineer, James Leonard. The powerhouse is a Renaissance Revival building located at the western end of the dam. The power plant, built in 1907, was one of the first peaking power plants built in the state, and the hollow concrete dam is one of the highest hollow (or Ambursen-type) buttress dams ever built, having been described as "the highest power dam in New England" in 1928. The facility was nominated for the National Register of Historic Places in 1985, where it is currently listed.

== Description ==
The Ellsworth Dam is located between two bluffs which flank Maine's Union River, and rise to a height of more than 100 feet (30 m). The dam consists of a series of buttresses, each set on a schist bedrock ledge, three feet thick, and spaced about 15 feet (4.6 m) apart, which provide support for two large slabs of steel-reinforced concrete that span the river between the bluffs. The dam is 71 feet (22 m) in height, with a spillway 60 feet (18 m) long. The schist ledge ensures the longevity of the dam.

The power station is located at the base of the dam on the west bank of the river. It is a 1 1/2-story structure built out of concrete blocks, with a red tile gabled roof. The Renaissance Revival structure has round-arch windows which are connected by a stone belt course, and there are Palladian windows in the gable ends. An addition on the building's rear was built with similar styling.

The Ellsworth Dam produces 29,907 megawatt-hours per year as of 2012, and is licensed to supply about 30,000 megawatt-hours per year, which is 1% of Maine's hydropower. It is one of the 118 power-generating dams in Maine as of 2016. The flow of water at the Ellsworth Dam is controlled by the Graham Lake Dam, which created Graham Lake.

== History ==
The power station was built in 1907 by the Bar Harbor and Union River Power Company, to designs by its engineer, James Leonard. The company was merged in 1925 into the Bangor Hydro-Electric Company, now part of Emera. Later, the plant was sold to Penobscot Hydro, and then to PPL in 1999. The plant was acquired by Black Bear Hydro in 2009 from PPL, and sold to Brookfield Partners in 2014.

The dam was in the process of being relicensed as of 2012; its most recent permit, issued by the Federal Energy Regulatory Commission in 1987, was due to expire in 2017. However, public concern about fish passage and water quality, caused the Federal Energy Regulatory Commission to delay issuing a new permit. The new expiration date is April 2020.

(The dam is no longer hollow. During the 1990s. the FERC required installation of post-tensioned anchors deep into ledge and the filling of the hollow dam with concrete, in order to increase dam safety.)

== See also ==
- National Register of Historic Places listings in Hancock County, Maine
