= John Bapst Memorial High School =

Location
- Bangor, Maine; USA; 44°48′19″N 68°46′07″W

Information
- Type: Coeducational secondary
- Motto: Integrity - Achievement - Respect
- Established: 1928
- Faculty: 39
- Enrollment: 500
- Average class size: 18
- Student to teacher ratio: 13:1
- Colors: Purple and White
- Athletics: 17 interscholastic
- Mascot: Crusader
- Website: www.johnbapst.org

John Bapst Memorial High School is a private, independent, college preparatory high school in Bangor, Maine, United States. It serves approximately 500 ninth through twelfth grade students from 50 different communities in the region. The majority of students who attend John Bapst Memorial High school come from the towns of Orrington, Glenburn, Veazie, Dedham, School Administrative District 63 (which includes the towns of Holden, Eddington, and Clifton), Milford, Bradley, and Orland. In 2011-2012 the school became a residential international school and now also serves approximately 50 international students from China, Vietnam, Korea, Kazakhstan, Spain, Germany, Austria, Albania, Egypt, Mongolia and elsewhere.

Average SAT and AP score results are higher compared to national and state averages. The majority of students take at least one Advanced Placement examination; in an average year, over 500 AP exams are taken by John Bapst students.

== History ==
Founded on September 10, 1928, as a Catholic school as a result of overcrowding at St. John's School and Bangor Catholic High School for Girls, the school graduated its first class of girls in 1929. The school operated for four decades as a gender-specific educational environment: the school was bifurcated by the auditorium, with the north wing for boys, the south wing for girls. Later, due to fire safety codes, the rear parts of the auditorium were turned into the front hallways on the first and second stories which now connect the two wings of the original building.

In June 1980, the Diocese of Portland made the decision to close the school. It reopened the following fall as John Bapst Memorial High School, an independent, coeducational, nonreligious, college preparatory institution, for 193 students. This was championed by a small group of community members led by Joseph W. Sekera, an alumnus and the school's principal until 2002. In 1988, the institution purchased the building from the Diocese of Portland.

The school was named in honor of John Bapst, a Jesuit missionary and educator who, among other things, built the first Catholic church in Bangor in 1856.

== Admission ==
For John Bapst and other publicly funded private schools, the State of Maine sets secondary tuition annually (in 2009–10, at $9,154.37). Under Maine's school choice program, more than 90% of John Bapst students have their tuition paid for by public funds provided by their sending communities.

While students must apply to be admitted to John Bapst, no formal admission test is administered to determine what students are accepted. Application is free of charge.

As of 2020 it takes high school students who graduated from tribal K-8 schools.

== Sports ==
Bapst offers 17 of 20 varsity sports sponsored by the Maine Principals' Association.

=== John Bapst sports facts and figures ===
Since 1981, John Bapst teams have brought home 15 State Championships spread among the following teams: Football, Girls' and Boys' Basketball, Baseball, Cross-Country, Indoor Track, Cheering, and Girls' Outdoor Track and Field. John Bapst is the defending Class C football state champions defeating Winthrop after a championship drought of over 30 years.

The Girls' Outdoor Track and Field team is the most successful team at Bapst, having successfully defended their State Title for the 5th consecutive time in 2006. They are the current holders of the Maine State Class C Title, having won it from 2002 to 2006. The 2005 women's 3200 meter relay team currently hold the Maine state record with a time of 9:43.30. The Bapst Cheering team is the only team to have ever won two consecutive state championships, having won the Class B title in 2005 and defended it in 2006. They now hold the Eastern Maine title for three years running.

Since 1981, John Bapst teams have won 10 Good Sportsmanship awards in Wrestling, Swimming, Girls' Soccer, and Girls', Boys', and Freshman Basketball. Of those banners, John Bapst Wrestling holds the most with 5 (1991, 1997, 2000, 2004–05), followed by Girls' Swimming and Diving with 3 (2004–06).

The Bapst Crusaders football team experienced a 41-game losing streak from 1998 to 2003. Former starting quarterback Josh Keefe recounted his experience losing 23 of those games in Slate Magazine.

== Clubs and activities ==
John Bapst offers many clubs and activities including numerous performance (e.g. band, chorale, drama, etc.), artistic (e.g. art, photography, etc.), academic (e.g., science, math, etc.), language/culture (French, Spanish, Chinese, etc.) and activity clubs (e.g., chess, guitar, etc.).

=== List of affiliated student groups ===
- Junior Classical League — Latin club
- Key Club — A community service club
- National Honor Society — An academic leadership club
- SEAC — Though the Student Environmental Action Committee is not officially affiliated with the national organization, it shares the same mission.

=== Robotics ===
In April 2026, the SnuggleMuffins, a robotics team from John Bapst, reached the semifinals in the 2026 VEX Robotics World Championship.

== Awards ==
John Bapst has been awarded Platinum status by the College Board, the highest available ranking, for 2023, 2024, and 2025. This places John Bapst among the top 7% of high schools in the nation for AP participation and success. In both 2009-10 and 2008–09, a John Bapst student was honored with the Siemens/College Board award as the top female math-science AP test-taker in Maine. In 2006–07 the school won the Siemens Awards for Advanced Placement as a whole for school-wide achievement in math and science. John Bapst's Math Department has had as many as four Advanced Placement graders at one time. Math teacher Brendan Murphy has won the Presidential Award as Maine's top math teacher and the College Board's top New England Educator Award for his extensive work in AP Calculus and AP Statistics, including workshops in Africa, Asia, Europe, South America, and Oceania. He was one of eighteen Siemens Award winners across the country in 2005 before coming to John Bapst. Mr. Murphy was recently nominated by a former student and received the University of Maine Pulp and Paper Teacher Recognition Award for 2015. Brendan was on the AP Calculus Test Development Committee for five years and then was asked to be on the AP Precalculus Test Development for three years. He is currently on a team writing a new AP Precalculus Textbook.

== Fire ==
On February 18, 2015, the Bangor Fire Department responded to a fire at the school. Around 11:00am, school employees were attempting to melt ice on the roof with a blowtorch. The flames from the torch lit a fire underneath the roof of the building. The fire damaged a biology lab and a chemistry classroom located on the 4th level of the school. Water also damaged the historic auditorium and the gymnasium below. A Bangor firefighter was injured when part of the auditorium roof collapsed on top of him. The fire occurred during school vacation week, so no students were inside the building. A dozen faculty members were evacuated safely. School reopened the following Monday.

== List of associated notable people ==
=== Alumni ===
- Patrick Duddy - United States Ambassador to Venezuela
- Tabitha King — Author and wife of Stephen King
- Pat LaMarche — 2004 Green Party Vice Presidential Nominee, Green Independent Party candidate for governor in 1998 and 2006
- Stephanie Niznik - 1986, Actress
- Orono Noguchi - 2017, lead singer for pop band Superorganism
- Graham Platner — 2003, Candidate running in the Democratic primary for United States Senate
- Kate Elizabeth Russell - novelist, author of My Dark Vanessa
- Katee Stearns — 2006, Miss Maine USA
- Todd Verow - 1985, Film Director
