= Bog River (Maine) =

River in Maine, United States

Location
- Country: United States

Physical characteristics
- Source
  - location: Maine
- Mouth
  - location: East Branch Union River
  - coordinates: 44°45′06″N 68°15′36″W
  - elevation: 235 feet (70 m)
- Length: 9.4 mi (15.1 km)

Basin features
- Progression: E. Br. Union R. – Graham Lake – Union River – Union River Bay

The Bog River is a river in Hancock County, Maine. From its source (44°41′51″N 68°10′11″W) on Sugar Hill in Maine Township 16 M D, the river runs 9.4 miles (15.1 km) northwest to its confluence with the East Branch of the Union River in Osborn.

== See also ==
- List of rivers of Maine
