= Robertson Quarry Galamander =

- U.S. National Register of Historic Places
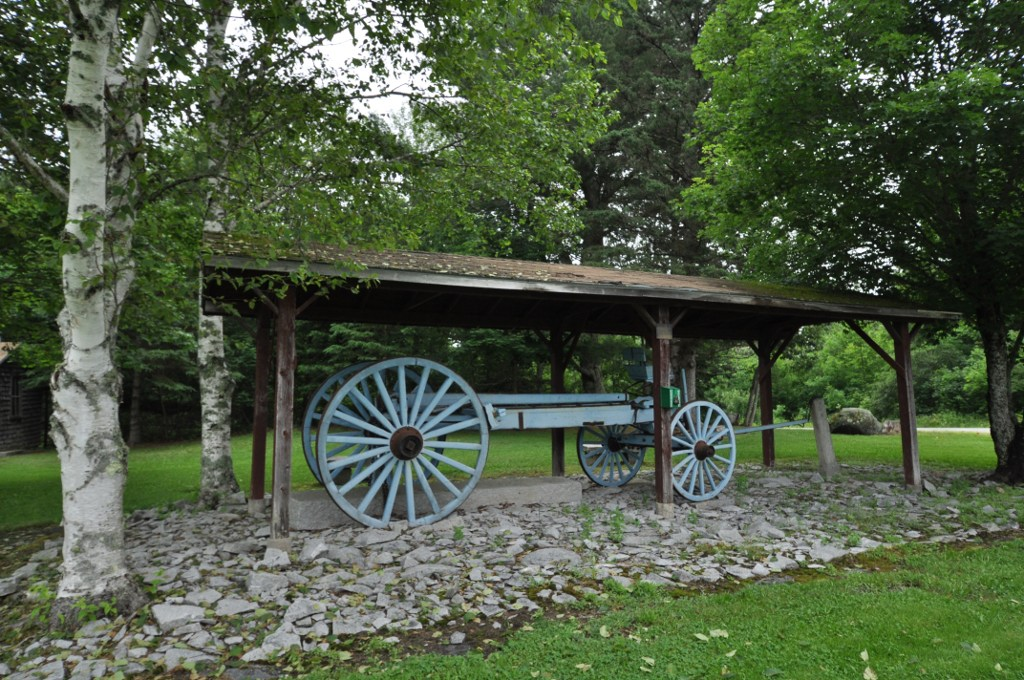

- Location within Maine Location within the United States
- Location: ME 182 E side, NE of jct. with Grist Mill Rd., West Franklin, Maine
- Coordinates: 44°34′45″N 68°15′51″W
- Area: less than one acre
- Built: 1890
- NRHP reference No.: 92001292
- Added to NRHP: October 2, 1992

The Robertson Quarry Galamander is a rare surviving example of a specialized stone-hauling vehicle. It is located in a small public park on the east side of Maine State Route 182 at its junction with Grist Mill Road in Franklin, Maine. It is the only known surviving intact example of the form, which was used widely in Maine's granite quarries. It was listed on the National Register of Historic Places in 1992.

== Description and history ==
The galamander is a wagon-like conveyance, about 18 feet (5.5 m) long and 6 feet (1.8 m) wide. It has four wooden spoked wheels, the rear pair 6 feet (1.8 m) in diameter and the front ones 4 feet (1.2 m). The wheels have iron hubs and the wearing surface is also finished in iron. The "frame" of the wagon is a single large wooden beam, to which the rear axle assembly and a front swivel mount for the front axle are attached. A simple seat with a metal spring is fastened above the front axle, and a derrick consisting of a single tapered beam is attached to a swivel mount above the rear axle. The derrick was used (in conjunction with a block and tackle) to raise slabs of stone onto and off the galamander. The wagon is braked by friction pads on the rear wheels which are activated by a lever controlled by the driver. The galamander would have been drawn by a team of horses or oxen. It is presently set in a display configuration under a gable-roofed shelter in a small municipal park, along with interpretive panels explaining its historical use.

This galamander is one of only two known to survive from Maine's quarries. The other, the Vinalhaven Galamander in Vinalhaven, Maine, is a 1960s reconstruction of one that was deemed in too poor condition to restore completely. The exact origin of the galamander's creation is not known, but they were in common use in Maine's mid-coastal granite quarries from the late 19th century into the early 20th century, with one historian crediting their development to Rev. W. H. Littlefield of Vinalhaven. This galamander was recovered from a local quarry in 1965.

== See also ==
- National Register of Historic Places listings in Hancock County, Maine
