= Vinalhaven Galamander =

- The Vinalhaven Galamander
- U.S. National Register of Historic Places
- Location within Maine
- Location: Bandstand Park, Vinalhaven, Maine
- Coordinates: 44°2′51″N 68°49′57″W
- Built: 1880
- NRHP reference No.: 70000049
- Added to NRHP: July 1, 1970

The Vinalhaven Galamander is a rare surviving example of a specialized stone-hauling vehicle in Vinalhaven, Maine. It is located in a small public park at the junction of Main, Atlantic, and School Streets in Vinalhaven's downtown area. Its wooden parts are a reproduction of original elements; its metal parts are original. The vehicle, a type used in the late 19th and early 20th centuries in the island's granite quarries, was listed on the National Register of Historic Places in 1970.

== Description and history ==
The Vinalhaven Galamander stands under a frame shelter in Bandstand Park, created by the intersection of Main, Atlantic, and School Streets in downtown Vinalhaven. Its frame consists of a single large wooden beam, with a fixed rear axle supported by two large spoked wheels. The front axle is mounted on a swivel to aid steering, and is supported by two small spoked wheels. The operator's seat is mounted at the center of the front axle, and a swiveling derrick is mounted on top of the rear axle. The vehicle would during operation have been drawn by a team of eight horses.

The construction date of this particular galamander is unknown, but it has long been a fixture of the town's landscape. These vehicles were in regular use during the heyday of Vinalhaven's granite quarries, which extended from 1880 to the onset of World War I in 1914. It stood for many years, exposed to the elements, in Bandstand Park. Its wooden elements having deteriorated, the wagon was rebuilt by the local historical society using new wood and the original metal fittings, and has been placed under a protective shelter.

The only known surviving galamander with original wooden elements is the Robertson Quarry Galamander in Franklin, Maine.

== See also ==
- National Register of Historic Places listings in Knox County, Maine
