= Brick School House =

- U.S. National Register of Historic Places
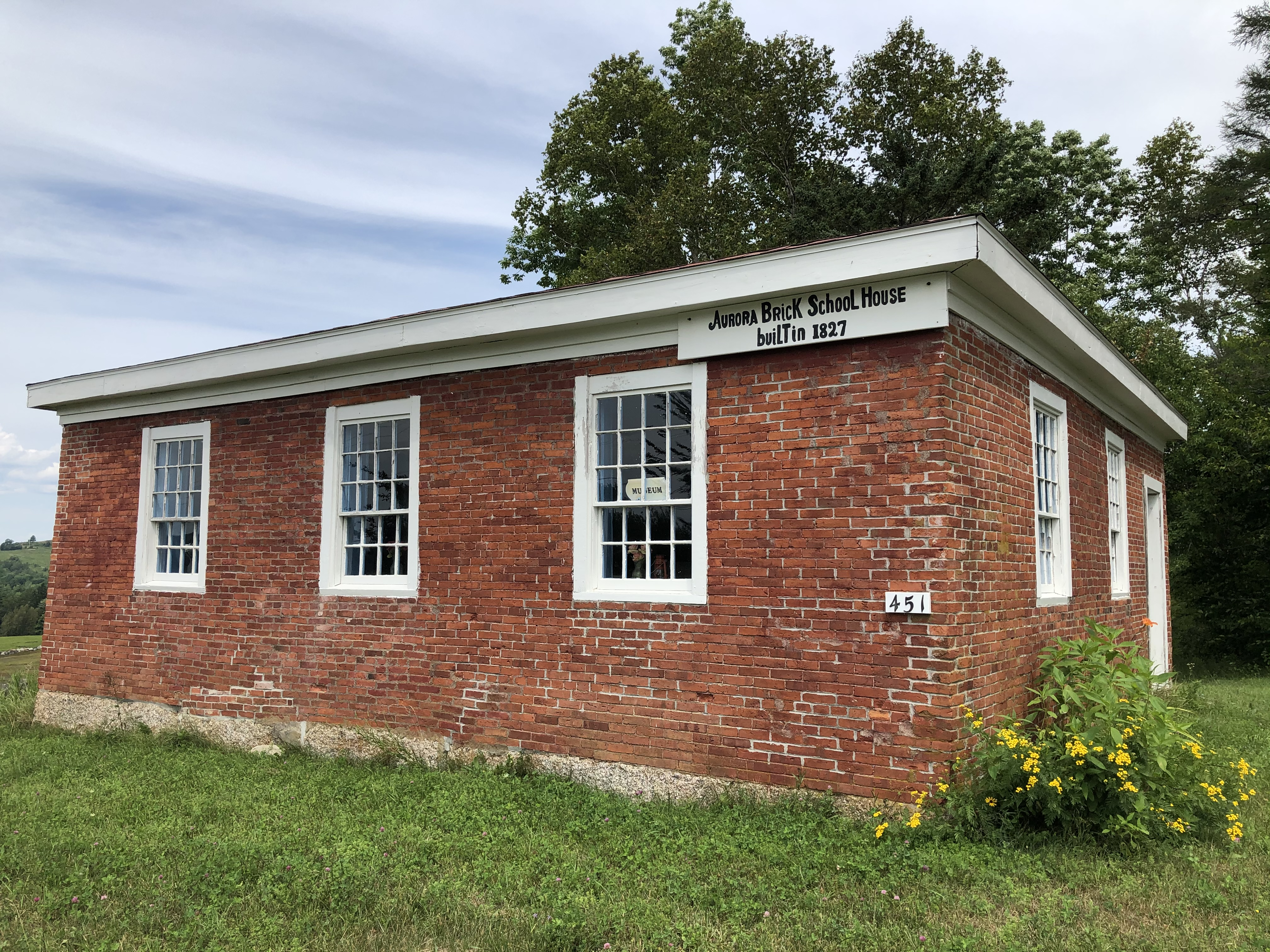

- Location within Maine Location within the United States
- Location: Aurora, Maine
- Coordinates: 44°50′51″N 68°19′43″W
- Area: less than one acre
- Built: 1827
- NRHP reference No.: 80000221
- Added to NRHP: April 23, 1980

The Brick School House is a former civic building on the north side of Maine State Route 179 in Aurora, Hancock County, Maine. Built of brick in 1827, it is the oldest standing public brick building in Hancock County. It was listed on the National Register of Historic Places in 1980.

== Description and history ==
The Brick School House is a single-story brick structure, with a hip roof and a granite foundation. It is set facing south on the east side of Maine State Route 179, about 0.25 miles (0.40 km) south of its junction with Maine State Route 9. It is roughly square in shape, with three windows on its west face, none on its east face, two on the north face, and two (along with the door) on the south face. The door, believed to be original, is board-and-batten. A brick chimney rises on the north side. The interior is simply finished, with wainscoted walls.

The town of Aurora was settled in 1808, and had by 1820 built its first schoolhouse. It authorized construction of this building in 1827. The use of brick in its construction is unusual, given the wide availability and use of wood as a building material in a community with a timber-based economy. It is believed that the impetus for using brick came from Samuel Silsby, the town's first settler, who was educated in a brick schoolhouse in Connecticut. The building was well ahead of its time in terms of standards, exceeding those established by the state twenty years later. It was used as a school until 1918, and has also been used as a town hall. It was rehabilitated in the 1950s.

In 1982, voters at a town meeting authorized the town selectman to seek a community development block grant to fix the Brick School House while authorizing a $750 expenditure from the town as well. The objective was to convert the building for use as a public library.

Somewhere around 2018-2019, the building was used as a community center. The building is currently listed on the National Register of Historic Places.

== See also ==
- National Register of Historic Places listings in Hancock County, Maine
