= Kate Elizabeth Russell =

American novelist

- Born: 1984 (age 41–42)
- Education: John Bapst Memorial High School; University of Maine at Farmington (BFA); Indiana University Bloomington (MFA); University of Kansas (PhD)
- Occupation: Author
- Writing career
- Notable work: My Dark Vanessa

Kate Elizabeth Russell (born 1984) is an American author. Her debut novel, My Dark Vanessa, was published in 2020 and became a national bestseller.

== Biography ==
Russell was raised in the town of Clifton, Maine, attending John Bapst Memorial High School in Bangor, Maine. She subsequently studied as an undergraduate at the University of Maine at Farmington, earning a Bachelor of Fine Arts in creative writing in 2006, and went on to earn an Master of Fine Arts from Indiana University Bloomington and a Doctor of Philosophy in creative writing from the University of Kansas.

Russell served on the adjunct faculty of Willamette University.

== My Dark Vanessa ==
Russell's first novel offers a fictional account of a traumatic sexual relationship between its protagonist, Vanessa Wye, and Jacob Strane. Wye is 15 years old and a lonely student at boarding school when Strane, her 42-year-old English teacher, begins grooming her for a sexual relationship which will come to cast an appalling shadow over her life. The novel is a first-person narrative, jumping forward and backward in time amongst 2000, 2007, and 2017, with this last year affording Russell the social context of the Me Too movement. The novel centers around Strane having her read books for class, which include The Bell Jar, Lolita, and Pale Fire.

It is implied that Vanessa is, at least in part, an unreliable narrator owing to her reluctance to see herself as a victim or Strane as a predator.

My Dark Vanessa was a national bestseller. It was selected for translation and publication in 22 countries, and optioned for the screen. Reviewed positively in a number of publications, My Dark Vanessa brought Russell into a public conversation regarding the novel's treatment of abusive sexual relationships, as well as an individual's right to privacy regarding past trauma.

Russell was shortlisted for the 2021 Dylan Thomas Prize for My Dark Vanessa.

=== Plagiarism accusations ===
Before My Dark Vanessa was published, author Wendy C. Ortiz complained that it had received different support from that given to Ortiz's memoir concerning a relationship with her 8th grade English teacher. Ortiz had not read Russell's book, but discussed Russell's alleged appropriation on Twitter with Roxane Gay. Gay subsequently published Ortiz's essay "Adventures in Publishing Outside the Gates," which alleged My Dark Vanessa bore "eerie story similarities" to Ortiz's memoir; the article began with an illustration of one artist copying another's work.

The Associated Press reported, "Reviewers who looked at both books saw no evidence of plagiarism," a conclusion echoed by Lila Shapiro of New York Magazine. Nevertheless, in response to social media comments, and in the wake of the controversy over American Dirt, Oprah Winfrey, who had originally tapped My Dark Vanessa as a selection for her influential Book Club, rescinded the selection.

As a result of the accusations of plagiarism and appropriation, Russell made a public statement disclosing that My Dark Vanessa had been inspired by her own experiences with sexual abuse as a teenager.

== Bibliography ==
- —— (2020). My Dark Vanessa. William Morrow. ISBN 9780062941527.
- —— (2021). Minton Quigley, Jenny (ed.). Lolita in the Afterlife: On Beauty, Risk, and Reckoning with the Most Indelible and Shocking Novel of the Twentieth Century. Vintage.
