= West Branch Union River =

Location
- Country: United States

Physical characteristics
- Source
  - location: Maine
- Mouth
  - location: Union River
  - coordinates: 44°43′59″N 68°23′10″W
  - elevation: 32 feet (10 m)
- Length: 20 miles (32 km)

The West Branch Union River is a river in Hancock County, Maine. From the outflow of Great Pond (44°56′47″N 68°17′32″W) in the town of Great Pond (Plantation No. 33), the river runs 20.1 miles (32.3 km) southwest and south to Graham Lake, where it joins the East Branch in Mariaville to form the Union River.

== See also ==
- List of rivers of Maine
