= Catherine Mountain =

Mountain in Maine, United States

- Location within Maine

Highest point
- Elevation: 961 ft (293 m)
- Coordinates: 44°36′59″N 68°05′09″W

Geography
- Location: Hancock County, Maine, U.S.

Climbing
- Easiest route: Hiking, class 1

Catherine Mountain (colloquially, Catherine's Hill) is a 962-foot-high (293 m) mountain in Township 10 SD (commonly referred to as the Blackswoods Township or Blacks Woods District) Hancock County, Maine. Catherine's Hill is locally referred to as the section of the Black's Woods Road (Route 182 between Franklin and Cherryfield) which summits near the mountain, the rise ending a short distance from Fox Pond. Both are named after a legendary woman named Catherine, whose ghost is said to haunt the hill.

== Legend of Catherine's Ghost ==
Travelers who claim to have seen Catherine's ghost on the hill most commonly describe a woman approaching the traveler asking for a ride, sometimes to Bar Harbor. Catherine is said to be dressed in a light blue evening or ball gown. Travelers who decline the ghost's request suffer various consequences. Purportedly Catherine was traveling on the road with her husband or boyfriend, after their wedding or prom night in Bar Harbor, when they were in some kind of accident (that it was a car accident is belied by the fact that the "Catherine's Hill" moniker predates the widespread use of cars in the area, at least back to the 1930s). It is said that Catherine lost her head in the accident, that her significant other was never found, and that Catherine wanders Catherine's Hill and the Black's Woods area searching for her head and her missing love.

In Downeast folklore, there are other reputed stories dating as far back as the colonial period; some alleged that the eponymous Catherine was a witch, executed nearby, or a local girl lost to the supernatural forces of the region. Some argue that the hill was named for a landholder's wife, or another yet undocumented historical figure. Historically, the area has long been considered part of some of the most rural territory as it is a distance from the historic routes along the coast and surrounded by the Schoodic Foothills, thick forests, as well as bogs, fens, marshes and creeks.

The book Dark Woods, Chill Waters: Ghost Tales from Down East Maine contains several variations on the legend. It also includes testimony suggesting that the Catherine legend may have been based on an entirely uneventful evening in the life of one Catherine Downing, d. December 29, 1862.

Catherine Mountain is adjacent to both Schoodic Mountain and Black Mountain, forming a trifecta of three large highlands in the midst of the Schoodic area of Downeast Maine. Considered part of the Schoodic Foothills region, Blacks Woods and Catherine Mountain are part of the more specific area referred to as the “Downeast Outback”, being further inland. Local features include the Blacks Woods, Martin Ridge, Fox Pond, Spring River Lake, and various scenic spots dotting the Route 182 corridor between Franklin's Rabbittown hamlet and the village of Cherryfield.
