= Beech Hill Pond =

Lake in Hancock County, Maine, United States

- Beech Hill Pond Lake
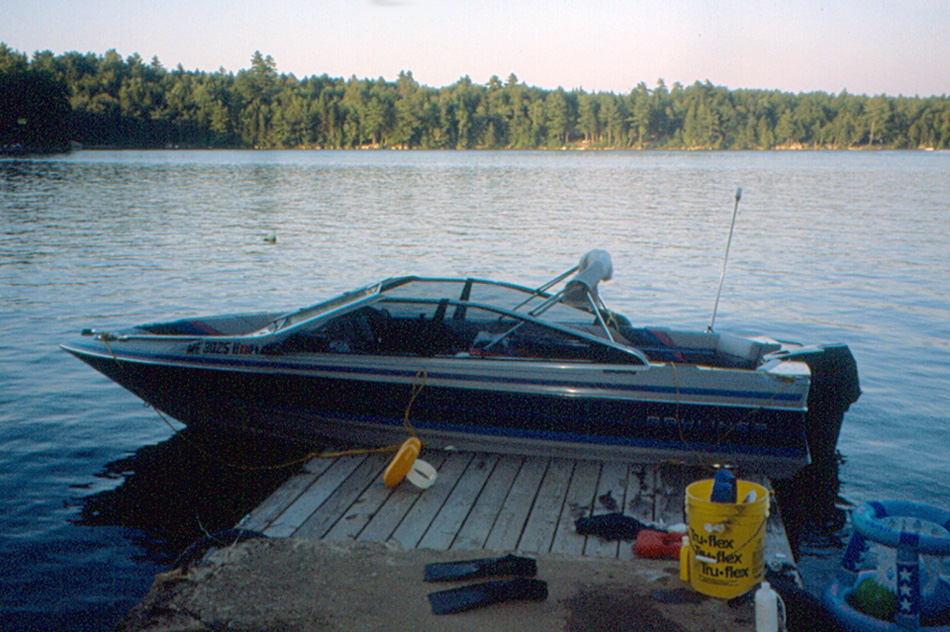
- Beech Hill Pond

- Location within Maine Location within the United States
- Coordinates: 44°41′N 68°28′W
- Primary inflows: Middle Brook
- Primary outflows: Beech Hill Stream
- Basin countries: United States
- Max. length: 4.5 mi (7.2 km)
- Max. width: 0.5 mi (0.80 km)
- Surface area: 1,351 acres (547 ha)
- Average depth: 44 ft (13 m)
- Max. depth: 104 ft (32 m)
- Water volume: 322×10^{6} cu ft (9.1 hm^{3})
- Shore length^{1}: 12.1 mi (19.5 km)
- Surface elevation: 200 ft (60 m)
- ^{1} Shore length is not a well-defined measure.

Beech Hill Pond is a lake in Otis, Hancock County, Maine, in the United States. It is 4.5 miles (7.2 km) long, half a mile wide, and up to 104 feet (32 m) deep. Trout, salmon, and other species of fish have been observed in the lake. Bald eagles and loons also live on the shoreline.

== Location and description ==
The pond is located near Maine State Route 180. It is also not far from the community of Ellsworth, Maine. Middle Brook and a number of other small brooks feed into it and Beech Hill Stream flows from the lake. The lake is 4.5 miles (7.2 km) long and 12.1 miles (19.5 km) around. On average, it is 0.5 miles (0.80 km) wide. The average elevation is 199 feet (61 m) above sea level.

Beech Hill Pond has an area of 1,351 acres (547 ha) and a maximum depth of 104 feet (32 m). The average depth is 44 feet (13 m). The temperature at the surface is 74 °F (23 °C), while at a depth of 100 feet (30 m), the temperature is 46 °F (8 °C).

In 1912, the volume of Beach Hill Pond was 322,000,000 cubic feet (9,100,000 m^{3}).

Beech Hill Pond experiences erosion and also lacks a buffer in some places. The Secchi depth of the lake was approximately 13 metres (43 ft) in 1999, 11.5 metres (38 ft) in 2003, 9 metres (30 ft) in 2004, and 8.5 metres (28 ft) in 2007.

== Shoreline ==
There is a cave located 12 feet (3.7 m) underground on the western side of Beech Hill Pond. Ice has been found in it as late as July, causing it to be known as the "Cold Cellar".

The terrain at the edges of the Beech Hill Pond is relatively steep.

90 percent of the shoreline of Beech Hill Pond is developed. Development in the area has substantially increased since the early 1950s.

Beech Hill Pond can be divided in to five distinct areas:

- Turtle Cove
- Schoolhouse Cove
- Beech Hill Landing / Boatlanding Beach
- Cellarshore / Cellar Cove
- Beechwood Bay

== History ==
A public boat landing was built on Beech Hill Pond in 1983.

The Pond was allegedly, according to the Town and BHPA, named for the nearby ‘Beech Hill’, which can be seen from the majority of the shoreline. Beech Hill is named for the types of trees found along its rise.

In 2012, the ice receded from Beech Hill Pond on March 21, which is the earliest that it has left the lake since at least 1878. Prior to 2012, the earliest the ice had receded was April 2 (in 2006) and the latest it had receded was May 17 (in 1888).

== Biology and recreation ==
Fish found in Beech Hill Pond include salmon, rainbow trout, lake trout, brook trout, smallmouth bass, and several others. Pickerel are rare in the pond and the white perch population is declining. The largest lake trout in Maine was caught on the lake in 1958. It weighed 31.5 pounds (14.3 kg). Icefishing is also done on the lake.

Beech Hill Pond was said to be one of the "best bets for Maine lake trout" by Tom Seymour. It is impossible to fish from the lake's shore, although fishing can be done out on the lake.

The pond is a coldwater and warmwater fishery.

A total of 14 adult loons and one chick were observed on Beech Hill Pond in 2007 and 2008. There are two nesting families of bald eagles on the lake.

== See also ==
- List of lakes in Maine
