= Holden, Maine =

Town in Maine, United States

- Town
- Logo

- Location within Maine Location within the United States
- Coordinates: 44°45′25″N 68°37′23″W
- Country: United States
- State: Maine
- County: Penobscot
- Established: 1852

Area
  - Total: 32.53 sq mi (84.25 km^{2})
  - Land: 31.32 sq mi (81.12 km^{2})
  - Water: 1.21 sq mi (3.13 km^{2})
- Elevation: 230 ft (70 m)

Population (2020)
  - Total: 3,277
  - Density: 40.4/sq mi (15.6/km^{2})
- Time zone: UTC-5 (Eastern (EST))
  - Summer (DST): UTC-4 (EDT)
- ZIP code: 04429
- Area code: 207
- FIPS code: 23-33490
- GNIS feature ID: 582522
- Website: www.holdenmaine.com

Holden is a town in Penobscot County, Maine, United States. The population was 3,277 at the 2020 census.

== Geography ==
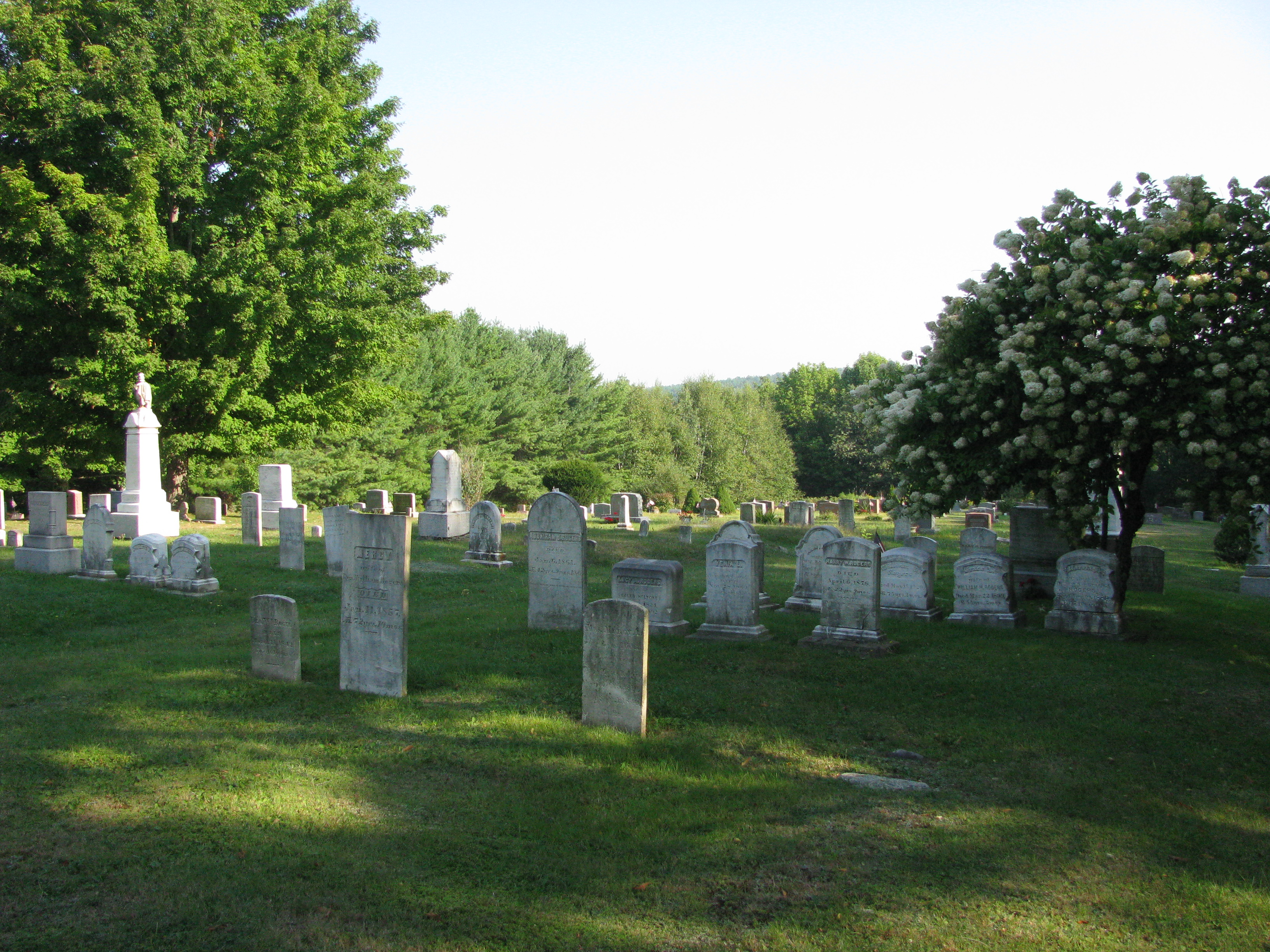
Hart's Corner, a cemetery, is located in Holden.

According to the United States Census Bureau, the town has a total area of 32.53 square miles (84.25 km^{2}), of which 31.32 square miles (81.12 km^{2}) is land and 1.21 square miles (3.13 km^{2}) is water.

== Demographics ==
Historical population
Census	Pop.	Note	%±
1860	805		—
1870	758		−5.8%
1880	717		−5.4%
1890	609		−15.1%
1900	602		−1.1%
1910	609		1.2%
1920	549		−9.9%
1930	543		−1.1%
1940	680		25.2%
1950	754		10.9%
1960	1,375		82.4%
1970	1,841		33.9%
1980	2,554		38.7%
1990	2,952		15.6%
2000	2,827		−4.2%
2010	3,076		8.8%
2020	3,277		6.5%
U.S. Decennial Census

As of 2000 the median income for a household in the town was $51,394, and the median income for a family was $62,208. Males had a median income of $39,427 versus $26,410 for females. The per capita income for the town was $25,047. About 4.4% of families and 6.5% of the population were below the poverty line, including 5.0% of those under age 18 and 9.2% of those age 65 or over.

=== 2010 census ===
As of the census of 2010, there were 3,076 people, 1,298 households, and 920 families residing in the town. The population density was 98.2 inhabitants per square mile (37.9/km^{2}). There were 1,480 housing units at an average density of 47.3 per square mile (18.3/km^{2}). The racial makeup of the town was 97.1% White, 0.5% African American, 0.7% Native American, 0.1% Asian, 0.2% Pacific Islander, 0.3% from other races, and 1.1% from two or more races. Hispanic or Latino of any race were 1.5% of the population.

There were 1,298 households, of which 26.3% had children under the age of 18 living with them, 59.2% were married couples living together, 8.0% had a female householder with no husband present, 3.7% had a male householder with no wife present, and 29.1% were non-families. 23.6% of all households were made up of individuals, and 8.4% had someone living alone who was 65 years of age or older. The average household size was 2.37 and the average family size was 2.79.

The median age in the town was 46.4 years. 19.9% of residents were under the age of 18; 6.5% were between the ages of 18 and 24; 21% were from 25 to 44; 38.1% were from 45 to 64; and 14.2% were 65 years of age or older. The gender makeup of the town was 49.3% male and 50.7% female. In July 2015, former Maine State Representative Chris Greeley was named Chief of the Holden Police Department.

== Schools ==
Holden is part of Maine School Administrative District 63, which also includes Clifton and Eddington. Holden Elementary School and Holbrook Middle School are the two schools that students attend in the area. After graduation from middle school, students can choose which of the local high schools they will attend.
