= Wendy C. Ortiz =

American writer, poet (born 1973)

- Born: May 16, 1973 (age 53) Los Angeles, California, United States
- Occupation: Non-fiction writer, essayist, memoirist, poet, psychotherapist
- Education: Evergreen State College (BA), Antioch University Los Angeles (MFA, MA)
- Genre: literary nonfiction

Website
- wendyortiz.com

Wendy C. Ortiz (born 16 May 1973) is an American memoirist, essayist, writer, poet, and psychotherapist. She lives in Los Angeles.

== Early life and education ==
Wendy C. Ortiz was born in 1973, in Los Angeles, California. She is of Mexican heritage.

She earned her Bachelor of Arts in Liberal Arts from Evergreen State College in 1995 and lived in Olympia, Washington for eight years before returning to Los Angeles where she presently resides. While living in Olympia, Washington, Ortiz was a mudwrestler, library worker, and editor and publisher of 4th Street, a handbound literary journal founded by Thomas Walton and subsequently edited by Teresa Carmody.

Ortiz earned her Master of Fine Arts degree in creative writing (2002) as well as her Master of Arts in clinical psychology (2010) from Antioch University in Los Angeles, California.

== Career ==
She was co-founder, curator and host of the Rhapsodomancy Reading Series, which began at the Good Luck Bar in Los Angeles in 2004 and continued through 2015. Ortiz was a Writer-in-Residence at Hedgebrook in 2007 and 2009.

In 2015 she adapted a short play from her essay "Spell" in collaboration with and directed by Meera Menon for One Axe Productions.

In spring 2018, she served as visiting writer of creative nonfiction in the MFA Program at CalArts. Ortiz is a psychotherapist in private practice.

=== Works ===
Ortiz is the author of three books: Excavation: A Memoir, (Future Tense Books, 2014) Hollywood Notebook (Writ Large Press, 2015), and Bruja (Civil Coping Mechanisms, 2016). A second edition of Hollywood Notebook was published by CCM and WritLarge Press in 2018. In 2025, all three of Ortiz's books will be rereleased by Northwestern University Press.

== Critical reception ==
Amy Sachs at Bustle named Excavation: A Memoir one of "11 Groundbreaking Books About Women Making History With Their Thinking, Activism, And Courage" and JoAnna Novak at Bustle calls Ortiz, one of "9 Women Writers Who Are Breaking New Nonfiction Territory."

Of her books Excavation and Hollywood Notebook, Lesley Heiser at The Rumpus wrote, "With her bold books, Ortiz defies society to ignore her, to resist her. But we're becoming more and more aware of her. Her dark blossoming is changing us."

Of Hollywood Notebook, Jeva Lange at Electric Literature said, "The entire project becomes nearly reminiscent of the self-musings of Maggie Nelson, if Nelson were consulting astrological charts rather than philosophy…Hollywood Notebook, then, is a sui generis gem, and one to take advantage of immediately."

Ellie Robins at the Los Angeles Times called the prose in Bruja "spare and at times mesmerizing" and added, "Ortiz celebrates [the] dark side of the human mind, nowhere more so than in Bruja...It's testament to Ortiz's courage as a memoirist that she's willing to live for a while on this submarine plane, among the elements that dictate her fate — and to invite her readers along for the show."

== My Dark Vanessa controversy ==
Ortiz's "Adventures in Publishing Outside the Gates" featured an illustration of one artist copying another's work. The Associated Press debunked the alleged theft.

On January 19, 2020, Ortiz tweeted about a then-unpublished novel by Kate Elizabeth Russell titled My Dark Vanessa, saying: "can’t wait until February when a white woman’s book of fiction that sounds very much like Excavation is lauded, Stephen King’s stamp of approval is touted, etc." Ortiz had not read Russell's book, but discussed Russell's alleged appropriation on Twitter with Roxane Gay. Gay subsequently published Ortiz's essay "Adventures in Publishing Outside the Gates," which alleged My Dark Vanessa bore "eerie story similarities" to Ortiz's memoir; the article began with an illustration of one artist copying another's work. The Associated Press has reported that "Reviewers who looked at both books saw no evidence of plagiarism." New York Magazine also said Ortiz's assertion of co-opting was unfounded. Nevertheless, in response to social media comments, and in the wake of the controversy over American Dirt, Oprah Winfrey rescinded her selection of My Dark Vanessa for her influential Book Club.

In 2023, Ortiz published a follow-up essay revisiting the controversy, in which she described the ostracization she experienced after making her allegations against Kate Elizabeth Russell three years earlier. Nevertheless, Ortiz has experienced subsequent literary success, including a Tin House residency, publication in BOMB, and the republication of her three books by Northwestern University Press.

== Bibliography ==
- Excavation: A Memoir, Future Tense Books, 2014.
- Hollywood Notebook, Writ Large Press, 2015.
- Bruja, Civil Coping Mechanisms, 2016.
