= Green Lake (Maine) =

Lake in Maine, United States

- Location within Maine Location within the United States
- Location: Ellsworth / Dedham counties, Maine, United States
- Coordinates: 44°38.5′N 68°29′W
- Catchment area: 59.2 square miles (153 km^{2})
- Basin countries: United States
- Surface area: 3,132 acres (1,267 ha)
- Average depth: 44 feet (13 m)
- Max. depth: 170 feet (52 m)
- Water volume: 106,204 acre⋅ft (131,001,000 m^{3})
- Residence time: 1.9 years
- Shore length^{1}: 28.8 miles (46.3 km)
- Surface elevation: 160 feet (49 m)
- Settlements: Dedham, Ellsworth
- ^{1} Shore length is not a well-defined measure.

Green Lake is a large stretch of freshwater lake located in the state of Maine, United States. It lies 17 miles (27 km) south of Bangor and 32 miles (51 km) north of Bar Harbor. Green Lake lies west of Route 180 and east of U.S. Route 1A and the Downeast Scenic Railroad. It is a tourist destination due to its sense of remoteness and natural environment.

Green Lake also contains a National Fish Hatchery, which is a part of the USFWS Atlantic salmon restoration and recovery program for Gulf of Maine rivers.

== The Legend of Guffer McKenzie ==
Green Lake has long been known for its large lake trout (togue) sometimes measuring up to 3 feet in length and weighing up to 10 pounds. The largest togue ever successfully caught and measured occurred in 2017 during the Hancock County Ice Fishing Derby, weighing in at 15.29 pounds. However, rumors have swirled now for nearly 2 decades about the largest fish never successfully caught: Guffer McKenzie.

In the Summer of 2002, three locals were enjoying some golden hour trolling when something bit the line of one of the fishing poles that was so large, it started pulling the boat backwards. When the local fishermen got the pole out of its hold, the entire thing was quickly ripped out of their hands and disappeared in to the depths of the lake.

In the Winter of 2003 there was a report of some visitors ice fishing in the middle of the west lake. When their flag went up they attempted to pull in the line, only to have the fish on the other end continue to out power them and take out nearly a hundred feet of line. The fishermen decided to attach the line to the end of their snowmobile and attempt to haul the fish out that way. After a long battle they finally got the fish near the surface of the hole, only to find that the fish itself could not fit up through the hole in the ice. They estimated that the head of the fish alone was nearly twice the circumference of the hole. During an attempt to drill more holes to get the fish out, it broke the line and swam free.

Although these are the first two reported cases of a "large fish", the stories quickly made their way through the locals, with many more strange occurrences being added, until one year when at the annual Pancake Breakfast when a mysterious man no one had seen before or since said, "Sounds like Guffer McKenzie has come out of hiding to start messing around again."
