= Graham Lake (Maine) =

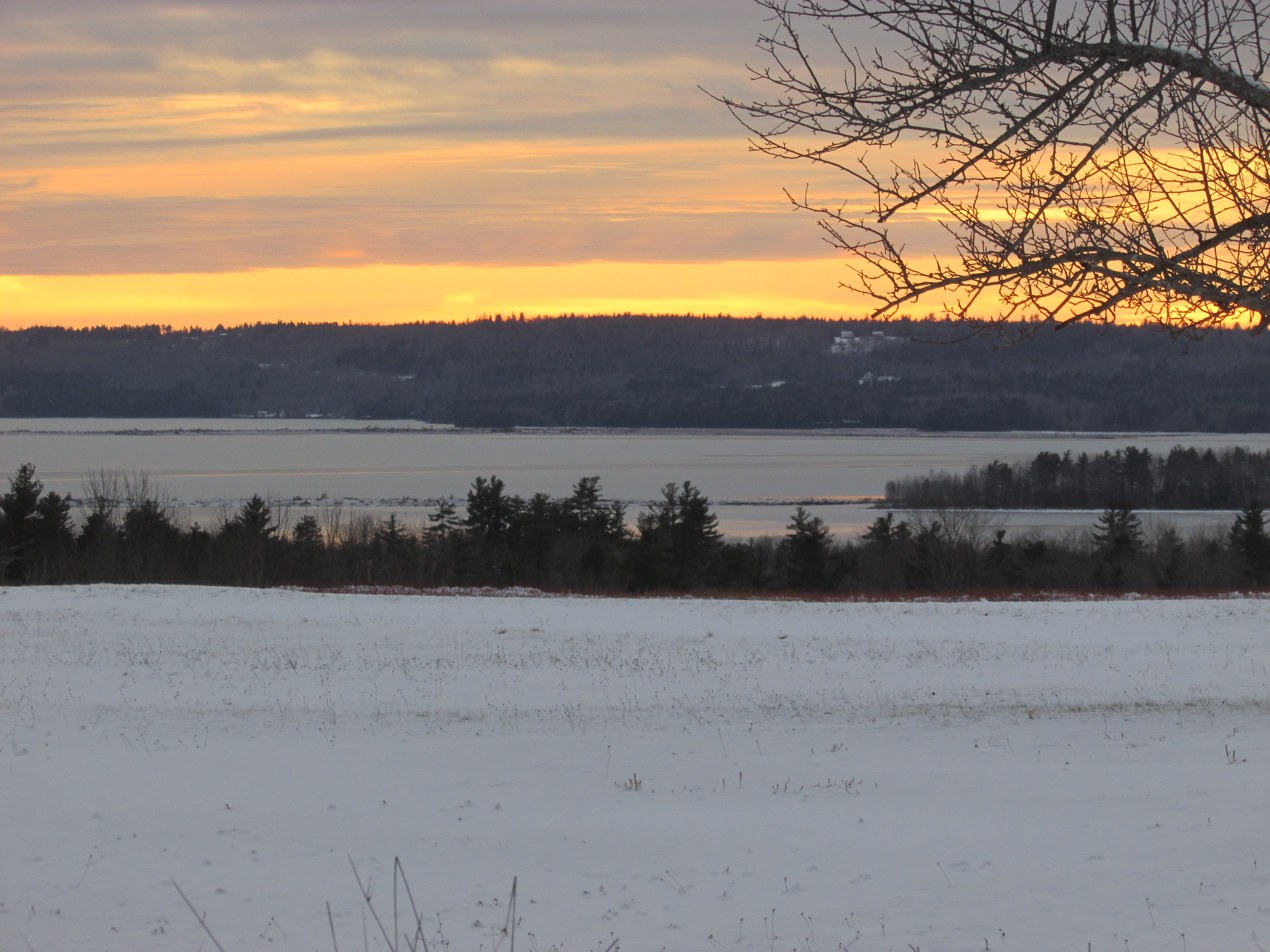
- Graham Lake in winter

- Location within Maine Location within the United States
- Location: Hancock County, Maine
- Coordinates: 44°39′30″N 68°23′57″W
- Type: eutrophic reservoir
- Primary inflows: Union River
- Primary outflows: Union River
- Catchment area: 499 sq mi (1,290 km^{2})
- Basin countries: United States
- Max. length: 13 miles (21 km)
- Surface area: 9,383 acres (3,797 ha)
- Average depth: 17 ft (5.2 m)
- Max. depth: 47 ft (14 m)
- Water volume: 105,603 acre⋅ft (130,259,000 m^{3})
- Residence time: 3 months
- Shore length^{1}: 89.8 mi (144.5 km)
- Surface elevation: 106 ft (32 m)
- Settlements: Ellsworth, Waltham, Mariaville
- ^{1} Shore length is not a well-defined measure.

Graham Lake in Hancock County, Maine is a eutrophic reservoir formed by the construction of a hydro-electric power dam in 1922 four miles (6 km) upstream from Ellsworth, Maine. The first dam was a hastily built earthen dam built by the Bangor Hydro Electric Company. It failed in 1923, flooding downtown Ellsworth and doing almost $8 million in property damage. The dam was rebuilt and operated by Bangor Hydro until its sale in 1999. The dam has since been acquired by PPL Corporation, which continues to use it to generate electricity.

Water clarity in the lake is low, with secchi disk measurements averaging less than 3 meters. Fish in the lake that are of interest to anglers include smallmouth bass, white perch, chain pickerel, landlocked salmon, and brook trout.
