= Union River (Maine) =

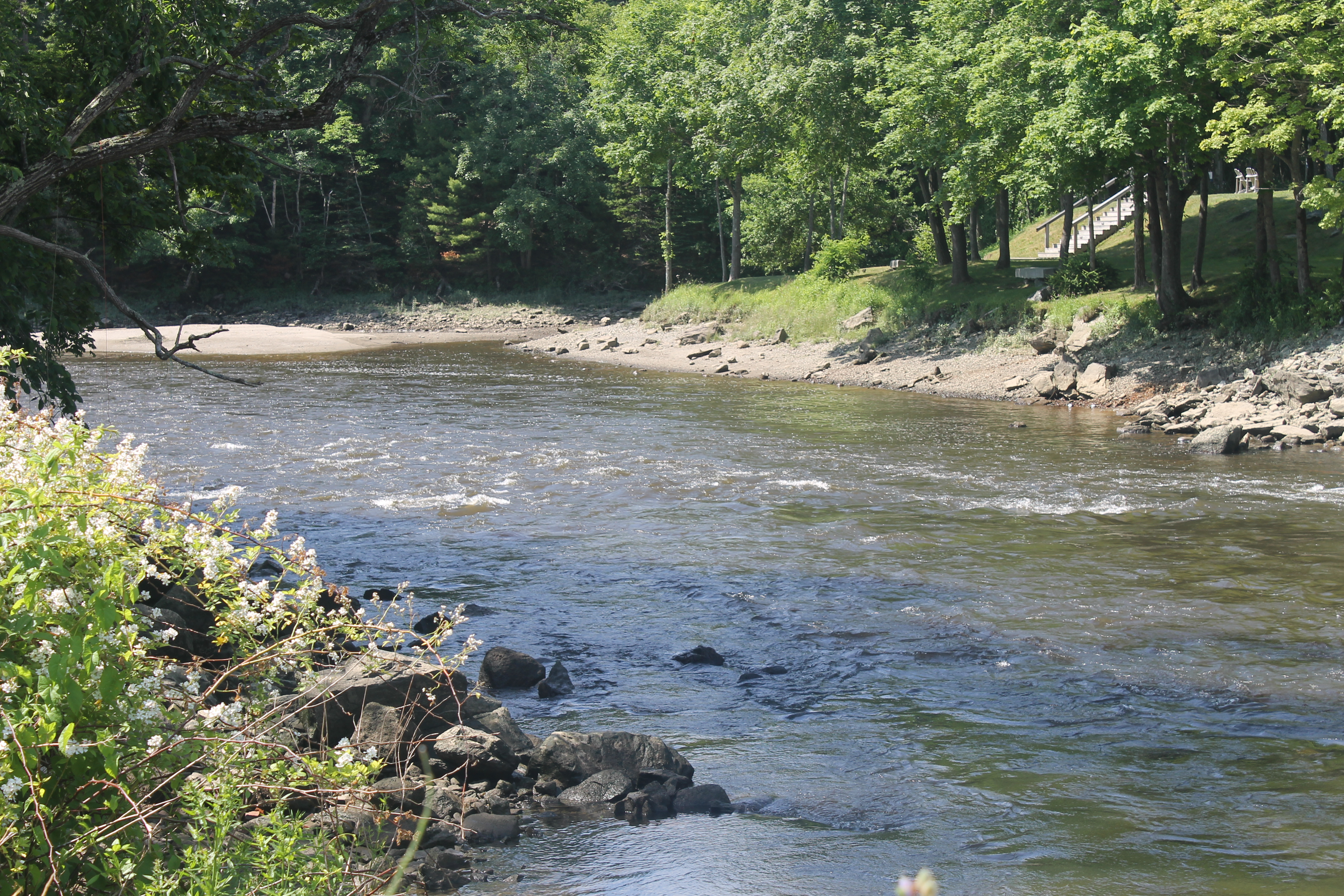
- The Union River in Ellsworth, Maine

Location
- Country: United States

Physical characteristics
- Source
  - location: Maine
- Mouth
  - location: Union River Bay
  - coordinates: 44°28′48″N 68°25′55″W
  - elevation: sea level
- Length: 22 mi (35 km)

Basin features
- Tributaries
  - left: East Branch Union River, Webb Brook
  - right: West Branch Union River

The Union River is a 21.9-mile-long (35.2 km) river that runs through Ellsworth, the county seat of Hancock County in eastern Maine. In the colonial era, it was known as the Mount Desert River.

The river forms at the north end of Graham Lake at the confluence of the river's East and West branches (44°43′48″N 68°23′04″W), on the border of the towns of Mariaville and Waltham. It runs south 13 miles (21 km) through Graham Lake to the dam at the lake's outlet, then continues south through Ellsworth, flowing through Leonard Lake and passing over its outlet dam just above the downtown. The Leonard Lake dam, also known as The Ellsworth Dam, built in 1907, spans the Union River and forms Lake Leonard. It houses a powerhouse with four generating units that combined produce 29,907 megawatt hours per year, enough to power about 3,000 households. At downtown Ellsworth, the river reaches tidewater, and flows south as an estuary for 5 miles (8 km) to its mouth at Union River Bay, on the border of Surry and Ellsworth, and thence into Blue Hill Bay.
