= Eastbrook, Maine =

Town in Maine, United States

- Town
- Location within the state of Maine
- Coordinates: 44°41′32″N 68°15′20″W
- Country: United States
- State: Maine
- County: Hancock

Area
  - Total: 37.65 sq mi (97.51 km^{2})
  - Land: 33.35 sq mi (86.38 km^{2})
  - Water: 4.30 sq mi (11.14 km^{2})
- Elevation: 217 ft (66 m)

Population (2020)
  - Total: 424
  - Density: 13/sq mi (4.9/km^{2})
- Time zone: UTC-5 (Eastern (EST))
  - Summer (DST): UTC-4 (EDT)
- ZIP code: 04634
- Area code: 207
- FIPS code: 23-19770
- GNIS feature ID: 582452
- Website: www.eastbrookme.com

Eastbrook is a town in Hancock County, Maine, United States. The population was 424 at the 2020 census.

== Geography ==
According to the United States Census Bureau, the town has a total area of 37.65 square miles (97.51 km^{2}), of which 33.35 square miles (86.38 km^{2}) is land and 4.30 square miles (11.14 km^{2}) is water.

The Municipality's territory encompasses several lakes (also termed 'ponds'), wetlands, marshes/bogs, nature preserve, blueberry barrens, and woodland, which include but are not limited to:

- Scammons Pond: an inter-locking chain of bodies-of-water
- Molasses Pond: one of the larger lakes in the Town that is shared between Eastbrook and Franklin, Maine and surrounding Townships
- Molasses Pond Bog: wetland/marshland adjacent to Molasses Pond; part of the Stone Dam Watershed.
- Webb Pond
- Abram's Pond
- Macomber Mill Marshes: wetlands along an indented area of the Neck Ridge area, partially between Scammons Pond & Molasses, feeding in to both along with nearby George's Pond (Franklin, Maine)
- Stone Dam: series of interlocking pools and rivulets feeding nearby bodies of water.

=== Areas ===
Eastbrook is a Municipality, governed by a New England Town style government with a board of selectmen and an annual open Town Meeting. While it is unitary municipal authority within Hancock County, the Town is essentially a series of small enclaves, hamlets, and villages, which encompass the geographic features of the area. The most well known are:

- Eastbrook Village / Greenwood Grange: located at the crossroads of Molasses Pond Road & Rte 200. Location of the Eastbrook Church, Municipal Offices, and a feel hope mes.
- Cave Hill: adjacent to the eponymous school and hill; near the Village proper and Rte 182.
- Molasses Pond: located along the northern shore of the pond of the same name, home to the Molasses Pond House.
- Back Cove / Schoodic Shore: area located along the southern side of Molasses Pond.
- Deep Cove: a small hamlet of a few camps and cottages on Molasses Pond's eastern shore.
- Western Shore / Macomber Mill: located along Neck Hill Ridge on the west shore of Molasses, running down in to Franklin.
- Sugarhill: a Hamlet on the hill of the same name, with a view dominated by Molasses Pond and the Schoodic Foothills.
- Roaring Brook: a few homes and camps scattered along a brook of the same name.
- Webb Pond: homes, camps, and cottages along the shores of the same named Pond.
- Abrams Pond: same as above.
- Bull Hill: site of the Bull Hill Wind Power Project.
- Township 16: a separate, survey township to the west of the town.
- Stone Dam: area adjacent to the stream and road of the same name.
- Waltham Crossing: area adjacent to the junction of Rte 182 & Rte 200.
- Foothills: area along Rte 200 from Franklin up to the Village Proper.
- Martin's Ridge: visible from parts of town, this area is primarily within the Blackswoods and Franklin.

Eastbrook was named for its relationship to the Union River watershed, being the site of the eastern branches that fed the river. Adjacent to the towns of Waltham, Mariahville, Fletchers Landing Township, Franklin, Blackswoods Township, and inland Unorganized Central Hancock County, Eastbrook is considered part of Downeast Maine's interior. The area hosts the Annual Eastbrook Days Festival, typically with events at the Molasses Pond House beach area or the Village proper.

== Culture ==
Molasses Pond is mentioned in N. Galen Havey's Memoirs of the Sweet Life on Molasses Pond. Roaring Brook is the site of an alleged incident as described abstractly in the song Where the East Brook Roars by local musician and artist Chris Ross. The Molasses Pond Writers Creative Collaborative Workshop meets at the Pond of the same name

Various flora and fauna are native to the region, such as: loons, trout, sunfish, eagles, moose, and deer.

In summer months, the Blueberry Barrens become dotted with labourers and machinery, for the Maine blueberry harvest. Lumber and gravel is also sourced within the town.

=== Local Lore ===
Molasses Pond is reputed to be so-named due to a series of canoes that sank to the bottom due to being overfilled with molasses and maple syrup sugar, having been harvested from trees on Sugarhill and being sent down the lake to Scammons and from there through the Macomber Mill Marshes to other lakes towards Hog bay and Frenchmans Bay. Allegedly, it is also reported to be named for either Molly Molasses or another notable native figure. According to the Pond's Facebook fan page, this and nearby Sugarhill have given rise to the term “the way the sweet life should be”, an homage to Maine’s secondary motto: “the way life should be”.

Nearby Blackswoods and Catherines Hill(Maine) are the site of a local ledges involving paranormal local folklore and urban legends, surrounding the ghost of blackwoods road.

Cavehill's eponymous cave-in-a-hill, also is rumoured in stories to be the site of treasure, ghosts, or historic events.

=== Regional Development ===
The area is also populated by a series of hills and hollows, as part of the inland Schoodic Foothills and Outback region of Hancock County, Maine.

In the late 2000s, developers sought permission to construct various renewable energy projects in land within or adjacent to the Town, such as the Bull Hill Wind Power Site.

== Demographics ==
Historical population
Census	Pop.	Note	%±
1830	81		—
1840	155		91.4%
1850	212		36.8%
1860	221		4.2%
1870	187		−15.4%
1880	289		54.5%
1890	246		−14.9%
1900	248		0.8%
1910	213		−14.1%
1920	204		−4.2%
1930	199		−2.5%
1940	188		−5.5%
1950	199		5.9%
1960	167		−16.1%
1970	188		12.6%
1980	262		39.4%
1990	289		10.3%
2000	370		28.0%
2010	423		14.3%
2020	424		0.2%
U.S. Decennial Census

=== 2010 census ===
As of the census of 2010, there were 423 people, 186 households, and 120 families residing in the town. The population density was 12.7 inhabitants per square mile (4.9/km^{2}). There were 504 housing units at an average density of 15.1 per square mile (5.8/km^{2}). The racial makeup of the town was 97.6% White, 0.2% African American, 0.7% Native American, and 1.4% from two or more races. Hispanic or Latino of any race were 0.7% of the population.

There were 186 households, of which 26.3% had children under the age of 18 living with them, 51.1% were married couples living together, 7.0% had a female householder with no husband present, 6.5% had a male householder with no wife present, and 35.5% were non-families. 28.0% of all households were made up of individuals, and 7.6% had someone living alone who was 65 years of age or older. The average household size was 2.27 and the average family size was 2.74.

The median age in the town was 46.8 years. 19.9% of residents were under the age of 18; 6% were between the ages of 18 and 24; 22% were from 25 to 44; 39% were from 45 to 64; and 13% were 65 years of age or older. The gender makeup of the town was 50.4% male and 49.6% female.

=== 2000 census ===
As of the census of 2000, there were 370 people, 156 households, and 105 families residing in the town. The population density was 11.1 inhabitants per square mile (4.3/km^{2}). There were 426 housing units at an average density of 12.8 per square mile (4.9/km^{2}). The racial makeup of the town was 99.19% White, 0.27% Native American, 0.54% from other races. Hispanic or Latino of any race were 1.62% of the population.

There were 156 households, out of which 32.7% had children under the age of 18 living with them, 53.2% were married couples living together, 12.2% had a female householder with no husband present, and 32.1% were non-families. 24.4% of all households were made up of individuals, and 7.7% had someone living alone who was 65 years of age or older. The average household size was 2.37 and the average family size was 2.84.

In the town, the population was spread out, with 25.7% under the age of 18, 5.1% from 18 to 24, 34.1% from 25 to 44, 26.5% from 45 to 64, and 8.6% who were 65 years of age or older. The median age was 38 years. For every 100 females, there were 94.7 males. For every 100 females age 18 and over, there were 91.0 males.

The median income for a household in the town was $31,667, and the median income for a family was $37,813. Males had a median income of $25,000 versus $20,096 for females. The per capita income for the town was $13,988. About 9.5% of families and 15.2% of the population were below the poverty line, including 29.7% of those under age 18 and 2.7% of those age 65 or over.

== Education ==
The school district is Regional School Unit 24. The zoned elementary school is Cave Hill School in Eastbrook. The district's secondary schools, Sumner Middle School and Sumner Memorial High School, are a part of the Sumner Learning Campus in Sullivan.
