= Otis, Maine =

Town in Maine, United States

- Town
- Location within Maine Location within the United States
- Coordinates: 44°43′49″N 68°29′31″W
- Country: United States
- State: Maine
- County: Hancock

Area
  - Total: 28.58 sq mi (74.02 km^{2})
  - Land: 24.77 sq mi (64.15 km^{2})
  - Water: 3.81 sq mi (9.87 km^{2})
- Elevation: 367 ft (112 m)

Population (2020)
  - Total: 673
  - Density: 27/sq mi (10.5/km^{2})
- Time zone: UTC-5 (Eastern (EST))
  - Summer (DST): UTC-4 (EDT)
- ZIP code: 04605
- Area code: 207
- FIPS code: 23-55890
- GNIS feature ID: 582654
- Website: townofotis.com

Otis is a town in Hancock County, Maine, United States. The population was 673 at the 2020 census.

== Geography ==
According to the United States Census Bureau, the town has a total area of 28.58 square miles (74.02 km^{2}), of which 24.77 square miles (64.15 km^{2}) is land and 3.81 square miles (9.87 km^{2}) is water.

== Demographics ==
Historical population
Census	Pop.	Note	%±
1830	350		—
1840	88		−74.9%
1850	124		40.9%
1860	210		69.4%
1870	246		17.1%
1880	304		23.6%
1890	239		−21.4%
1900	152		−36.4%
1910	115		−24.3%
1920	122		6.1%
1930	88		−27.9%
1940	134		52.3%
1950	109		−18.7%
1960	100		−8.3%
1970	123		23.0%
1980	307		149.6%
1990	355		15.6%
2000	543		53.0%
2010	672		23.8%
2020	673		0.1%
U.S. Decennial Census

=== 2010 census ===
As of the census of 2010, there were 672 people, 299 households, and 197 families living in the town. The population density was 27.1 inhabitants per square mile (10.5/km^{2}). There were 744 housing units at an average density of 30.0 per square mile (11.6/km^{2}). The racial makeup of the town was 97.9% White, 0.4% African American, 0.3% Native American, 0.1% Asian, 0.1% from other races, and 1.0% from two or more races. Hispanic or Latino of any race were 0.6% of the population.

There were 299 households, of which 24.1% had children under the age of 18 living with them, 55.9% were married couples living together, 7.0% had a female householder with no husband present, 3.0% had a male householder with no wife present, and 34.1% were non-families. 26.4% of all households were made up of individuals, and 8.6% had someone living alone who was 65 years of age or older. The average household size was 2.25 and the average family size was 2.72.

The median age in the town was 47.1 years. 18.7% of residents were under the age of 18; 5% were between the ages of 18 and 24; 22% were from 25 to 44; 39.1% were from 45 to 64; and 15.3% were 65 years of age or older. The gender makeup of the town was 50.7% male and 49.3% female.

=== 2000 census ===
As of the census of 2000, there were 543 people, 229 households, and 160 families living in the town. The population density was 21.8 people per square mile (8.4/km^{2}). There were 678 housing units at an average density of 27.2 per square mile (10.5/km^{2}). The racial makeup of the town was 98.90% White, 0.37% Native American, and 0.74% from two or more races. Hispanic or Latino of any race were 0.18% of the population.

There were 229 households, out of which 28.4% had children under the age of 18 living with them, 59.4% were married couples living together, 7.4% had a female householder with no husband present, and 29.7% were non-families. 25.8% of all households were made up of individuals, and 8.7% had someone living alone who was 65 years of age or older. The average household size was 2.37 and the average family size was 2.81.

In the town, the population was spread out, with 23.0% under the age of 18, 6.3% from 18 to 24, 29.7% from 25 to 44, 30.0% from 45 to 64, and 11.0% who were 65 years of age or older. The median age was 41 years. For every 100 females, there were 114.6 males. For every 100 females age 18 and over, there were 103.9 males.

The median income for a household in the town was $36,250, and the median income for a family was $47,917. Males had a median income of $36,979 versus $22,500 for females. The per capita income for the town was $20,375. About 8.4% of families and 9.5% of the population were below the poverty line, including 10.3% of those under age 18 and 14.5% of those age 65 or over.

== See also ==
- Beech Hill Pond
