= Aurora, Maine =

- Town
- Location within Maine Location within the United States
- Coordinates: 44°52′12″N 68°16′30″W
- Country: United States
- State: Maine
- County: Hancock

Area
  - Total: 39.25 sq mi (101.66 km^{2})
  - Land: 37.66 sq mi (97.54 km^{2})
  - Water: 1.59 sq mi (4.12 km^{2})
- Elevation: 262 ft (80 m)

Population (2020)
  - Total: 93
  - Density: 2.6/sq mi (1/km^{2})
- Time zone: UTC-5 (Eastern (EST))
  - Summer (DST): UTC-4 (EDT)
- ZIP code: 04408
- Area code: 207
- FIPS code: 23-02165
- GNIS feature ID: 582335
- Website: Town website

Aurora is a town in Hancock County, Maine, United States. The town was named for the goddess of dawn. The population was 93 at the 2020 census.

The Brick School House, a historic schoolhouse, is located in Aurora. It was built in 1827 and is the oldest standing public brick structure in Hancock County.

The Airline Community School (a pre-school through eighth grade school) serves the Aurora Community, as well as the communities of Great Pond, Osborn, and Amherst.

== Geography ==
According to the United States Census Bureau, the town has a total area of 39.25 square miles (101.66 km^{2}), of which 37.66 square miles (97.54 km^{2}) is land and 1.59 square miles (4.12 km^{2}) is water.

== Demographics ==
Historical population
| Census | Pop. | Note | %± |
|---|---|---|---|
| 1840 | 149 | | — |
| 1850 | 217 | | 45.6% |
| 1860 | 277 | | 27.6% |
| 1870 | 212 | | −23.5% |
| 1880 | 212 | | 0.0% |
| 1890 | 175 | | −17.5% |
| 1900 | 152 | | −13.1% |
| 1910 | 114 | | −25.0% |
| 1920 | 95 | | −16.7% |
| 1930 | 86 | | −9.5% |
| 1940 | 81 | | −5.8% |
| 1950 | 91 | | 12.3% |
| 1960 | 75 | | −17.6% |
| 1970 | 72 | | −4.0% |
| 1980 | 110 | | 52.8% |
| 1990 | 82 | | −25.5% |
| 2000 | 121 | | 47.6% |
| 2010 | 114 | | −5.8% |
| 2020 | 93 | | −18.4% |
U.S. Decennial Census

=== 2010 census ===
As of the census of 2010, there were 114 people, 46 households, and 29 families living in the town. The population density was 3.0 inhabitants per square mile (1.2/km^{2}). There were 105 housing units at an average density of 2.8 per square mile (1.1/km^{2}). The racial makeup of the town was 99.1% White and 0.9% from two or more races. Hispanic or Latino of any race were 0.9% of the population.

There were 46 households, of which 23.9% had children under the age of 18 living with them, 54.3% were married couples living together, 8.7% had a female householder with no husband present, and 37.0% were non-families. 30.4% of all households were made up of individuals, and 6.5% had someone living alone who was 65 years of age or older. The average household size was 2.48 and the average family size was 3.17.

The median age in the town was 39.3 years. 28.1% of residents were under the age of 18; 3.5% were between the ages of 18 and 24; 26.3% were from 25 to 44; 33.3% were from 45 to 64; and 8.8% were 65 years of age or older. The gender makeup of the town was 53.5% male and 46.5% female.

=== 2000 census ===
As of the census of 2000, there were 121 people, 50 households, and 28 families living in the town. The population density was 3.2 inhabitants per square mile (1.2/km^{2}). There were 119 housing units at an average density of 3.2 per square mile (1.2/km^{2}). The racial makeup of the town was 98.35% White, 0.83% from other races, and 0.83% from two or more races.

There were 50 households, out of which 34.0% had children under the age of 18 living with them, 40.0% were married couples living together, 12.0% had a female householder with no husband present, and 44.0% were non-families. 30.0% of all households were made up of individuals, and 2.0% had someone living alone who was 65 years of age or older. The average household size was 2.42 and the average family size was 3.14.

In the town, the population was spread out, with 30.6% under the age of 18, 5.0% from 18 to 24, 29.8% from 25 to 44, 25.6% from 45 to 64, and 9.1% who were 65 years of age or older. The median age was 35 years. For every 100 females there were 124.1 males. For every 100 females age 18 and over, there were 115.4 males.

The median income for a household in the town was $26,250, and the median income for a family was $27,083. Males had a median income of $36,875 versus $17,083 for females. The per capita income for the town was $11,794. There were 22.2% of families and 14.0% of the population living below the poverty line, including 14.3% of under eighteens and 8.3% of those over 64.
