= Osborn, Maine =

Town in Maine, United States

- Town
- Location within Maine Location within the United States
- Coordinates: 44°46′24″N 68°15′10″W
- Country: United States
- State: Maine
- County: Hancock

Area
  - Total: 38.04 sq mi (98.52 km^{2})
  - Land: 35.20 sq mi (91.17 km^{2})
  - Water: 2.84 sq mi (7.36 km^{2})
- Elevation: 410 ft (120 m)

Population (2020)
  - Total: 65
  - Density: 1.8/sq mi (0.7/km^{2})
- Time zone: UTC-5 (Eastern (EST))
  - Summer (DST): UTC-4 (EDT)
- ZIP Codes: 04605 (Ellsworth); 04408 (Aurora)
- Area code: 207
- FIPS code: 23-55855
- GNIS feature ID: 582653
- Website: www.osbornmaine.org

Osborn is a town in Hancock County, Maine, United States. The population was 65 at the 2020 census.

== Geography ==
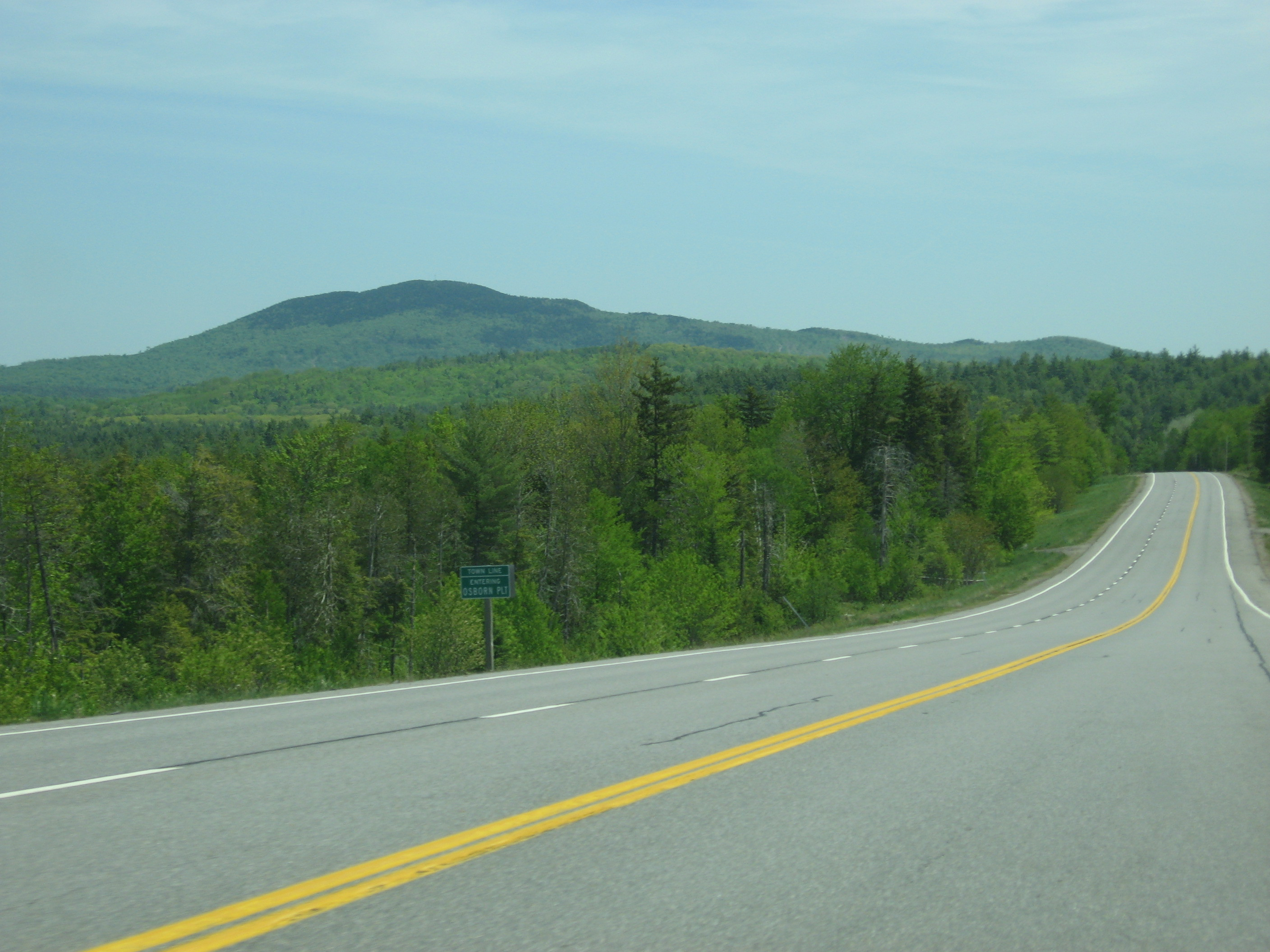
Lead Mountain, Maine viewed from the west along Maine State Route 9 at the border entering Osborn Plantation town line.

According to the United States Census Bureau, the town has a total area of 38.04 square miles (98.52 km^{2}), of which 35.20 square miles (91.17 km^{2}) is land and 2.84 square miles (7.36 km^{2}) is water.

== Demographics ==
Historical population
Census	Pop.	Note	%±
1930	34		—
1940	40		17.6%
1950	49		22.5%
1960	36		−26.5%
1970	33		−8.3%
1980	47		42.4%
1990	72		53.2%
2000	69		−4.2%
2010	67		−2.9%
2020	65		−3.0%
U.S. Decennial Census

=== 2010 census ===
As of the census of 2010, there were 67 people, 29 households, and 20 families living in the town. The population density was 1.9 inhabitants per square mile (0.7/km^{2}). There were 122 housing units at an average density of 3.5 per square mile (1.4/km^{2}). The racial makeup of the town was 95.5% White and 4.5% from two or more races.

There were 29 households, of which 27.6% had children under the age of 18 living with them, 55.2% were married couples living together, 13.8% had a female householder with no husband present, and 31.0% were non-families. 20.7% of all households were made up of individuals, and 13.8% had someone living alone who was 65 years of age or older. The average household size was 2.31 and the average family size was 2.60.

The median age in the town was 48.5 years. 17.9% of residents were under the age of 18; 4.6% were between the ages of 18 and 24; 16.5% were from 25 to 44; 38.7% were from 45 to 64; and 22.4% were 65 years of age or older. The gender makeup of the town was 44.8% male and 55.2% female.

=== 2000 census ===
As of the census of 2000, there were 69 people, 30 households, and 21 families living in the town. The population density was 1.9 people per square mile (0.7/km^{2}). There were 108 housing units at an average density of 3.0 per square mile (1.2/km^{2}). The racial makeup of the town was 100.00% White.

There were 30 households, out of which 30.0% had children under the age of 18 living with them, 53.3% were married couples living together, 20.0% had a female householder with no husband present, and 26.7% were non-families. 20.0% of all households were made up of individuals, and 13.3% had someone living alone who was 65 years of age or older. The average household size was 2.30 and the average family size was 2.59.

In the town, the population was spread out, with 18.8% under the age of 18, 8.7% from 18 to 24, 23.2% from 25 to 44, 34.8% from 45 to 64, and 14.5% who were 65 years of age or older. The median age was 44 years. For every 100 females, there were 86.5 males. For every 100 females age 18 and over, there were 75.0 males.

The median income for a household in the town was $33,750, and the median income for a family was $34,500. Males had a median income of $26,875 versus $23,750 for females. The per capita income for the town was $12,173. There were no families and 11.0% of the population living below the poverty line, including no under eighteens and 33.3% of those over 64.
