= Amherst, Maine =

Town in Maine, United States

- Town
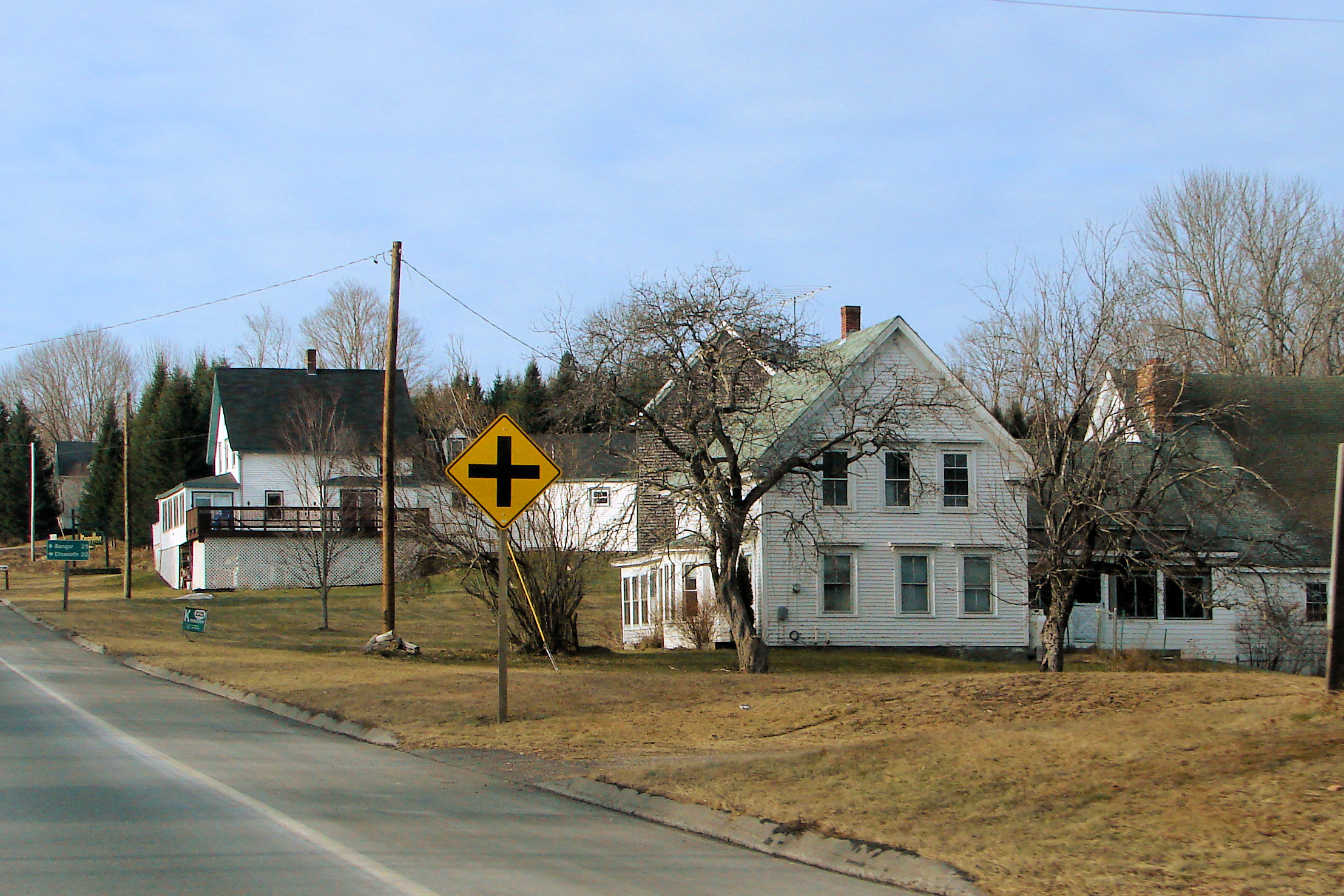

- Logo

- Location within Maine Location within the United States
- Coordinates: 44°51′12″N 68°24′07″W
- Country: United States
- State: Maine
- County: Hancock

Area
  - Total: 39.63 sq mi (102.64 km^{2})
  - Land: 39.32 sq mi (101.84 km^{2})
  - Water: 0.31 sq mi (0.80 km^{2})
- Elevation: 633 ft (193 m)

Population (2020)
  - Total: 248
  - Density: 6.2/sq mi (2.4/km^{2})
- Time zone: UTC-5 (Eastern (EST))
  - Summer (DST): UTC-4 (EDT)
- ZIP Code: 04605
- Area code: 207
- FIPS code: 23-01185
- GNIS feature ID: 2830676
- Website: www.amherstme.com

Amherst is a town in Hancock County, Maine, United States. The population was 248 at the 2020 census.

== Geography ==
According to the United States Census Bureau, the town has a total area of 39.63 square miles (102.64 km^{2}), of which 39.32 square miles (101.84 km^{2}) is land and 0.31 square miles (0.80 km^{2}) is water.

== Demographics ==
Historical population
Census	Pop.	Note	%±
1840	196		—
1850	323		64.8%
1860	384		18.9%
1870	350		−8.9%
1880	400		14.3%
1890	375		−6.2%
1900	364		−2.9%
1910	275		−24.5%
1920	198		−28.0%
1930	163		−17.7%
1940	146		−10.4%
1950	151		3.4%
1960	168		11.3%
1970	148		−11.9%
1980	203		37.2%
1990	226		11.3%
2000	230		1.8%
2010	265		15.2%
2020	248		−6.4%
U.S. Decennial Census

=== 2010 census ===
As of the census of 2010, there were 265 people, 121 households, and 78 families residing in the town. The population density was 6.7 inhabitants per square mile (2.6/km^{2}). There were 174 housing units at an average density of 4.4 per square mile (1.7/km^{2}). The racial makeup of the town was 98.5% White and 1.5% from two or more races. Hispanic or Latino of any race were 0.4% of the population.

There were 121 households, of which 21.5% had children under the age of 18 living with them, 52.9% were married couples living together, 5.0% had a female householder with no husband present, 6.6% had a male householder with no wife present, and 35.5% were non-families. 28.1% of all households were made up of individuals, and 9.9% had someone living alone who was 65 years of age or older. The average household size was 2.19 and the average family size was 2.56.

The median age in the town was 47.4 years. 17% of residents were under the age of 18; 6.1% were between the ages of 18 and 24; 22.6% were from 25 to 44; 41.9% were from 45 to 64; and 12.5% were 65 years of age or older. The gender makeup of the town was 52.5% male and 47.5% female.

=== 2000 census ===
As of the census of 2000, there were 230 people, 107 households, and 60 families residing in the town. The population density was 5.9 inhabitants per square mile (2.3/km^{2}). There were 153 housing units at an average density of 3.9 per square mile (1.5/km^{2}). The racial makeup of the town was 98.26% White, 0.43% Native American, 0.43% from other races, and 0.87% from two or more races. Hispanic or Latino of any race were 0.43% of the population.

There were 107 households, out of which 23.4% had children under the age of 18 living with them, 49.5% were married couples living together, 1.9% had a female householder with no husband present, and 43.0% were non-families. 33.6% of all households were made up of individuals, and 5.6% had someone living alone who was 65 years of age or older. The average household size was 2.15 and the average family size was 2.77.

In the town, the population was spread out, with 20.0% under the age of 18, 2.6% from 18 to 24, 30.9% from 25 to 44, 34.8% from 45 to 64, and 11.7% who were 65 years of age or older. The median age was 43 years. For every 100 females, there were 123.3 males. For every 100 females age 18 and over, there were 142.1 males.

The median income for a household in the town was $26,042, and the median income for a family was $30,833. Males had a median income of $27,917 versus $21,750 for females. The per capita income for the town was $16,548. About 8.1% of families and 14.9% of the population were below the poverty line, including 10.5% of those under the age of eighteen and 4.0% of those 65 or over.

== Historical references ==
From The New England Gazetteer: Containing Descriptions of the States, Counties ... by John Hayward. Published 1857, O Clapp:

Amherst, ME., Hancock Co.
This town is bounded on the S. by Mariaville.
The head waters of Union River pass through it.
It lies 22 miles (35 km) N. of Ellsworth, and 22 miles (35 km) E. of Bangor, on the road to Calais.
It has a Congregational Church and one large tannery.
This is a good farming town.

From A Survey of Hancock County, Maine by Samuel Wasson, Pub. 1878, Sprague, Owen & Nash:

Amherst. This town, like Aurora, is a six-mile (9.7 km) square. It is 22 miles (35 km) N.N.E. of Ellsworth. It is highly favored in respect to water power. It has one saw, one clapboard, one grist, two shingle mills, and a large tannery. Union River divides the town. East of it is good orchard land. West of the river, excepting the interval, the soil is granitic and the surfaces hilly. Near the 'corner' is a high ledge, some acres in extent, of a peculiar formation. Rev. Mr. Loring writes, that among its minerals are 'sulphuret of iron, crystals of quartz, slate and granite.' The high ledge we supposed to be porphyry, containing crystals of iron pyrites and compact feldspar. In the improvement of its stock, Amherst stands unrivaled; and this is due mainly to the energy and enterprise of A. B. Buzzell. Mr Buzzell has employed a mule team for years. The endurance of mules is wonderful; treated to cheap fare, and constant labor, yet rarely disabled or chargeable with lost time. It would be of mutual advantage to Amherst and Aurora, to put up a cheese factory at the 'corner.' Both towns have entered the cycle of years when farming is to be a paying pursuit. The hides used in the sole-leather tannery of Buzzell & Sons, are principally from South America and Mexico. It was set off from the plantation of Mariaville, in 1822, and incorporated on February 5, 1831. Its name was suggested from Amherst, N.H. It is thought that men began to come in and fell trees in it as early as 1802 or 1803. Among the first that came were Mr. Chapman, Mr. Shumway, Mr. Whitman, John Barker, John Giles, Thomas Harpworth and Mr. Graves. In 1805 Capt. Goodell Silsby came in from Charleton, N.H. In 1806 or 1807 his parents came and took up the lots now known as 'The Old Silsby Place.' The only meeting-house was erected in 1844. Three men, one living in Amherst and two in Aurora, built it. The first settlers endured many hardships. Some came into Ellsworth, in a vessel, and from that point found their way hither by following a spotted line on the trees. Some carried their grain twelve miles (19 km) on their backs to grist mill, and then home again. This is the 26th town. Population, 350. Decennary loss, 34. Wealth, per capita, $165. Area 23,040 acres (93.2 km^{2}). State valuation, $57, 276. U.S. valuation, $82,477. Union soldiers, 43; State aid, $522; town bounty, $5,300; cost per man, $142.

== Notable person ==
- Lawrence Lockman, state legislator
