= Clifton, Maine =

Town in Maine, United States

- Town
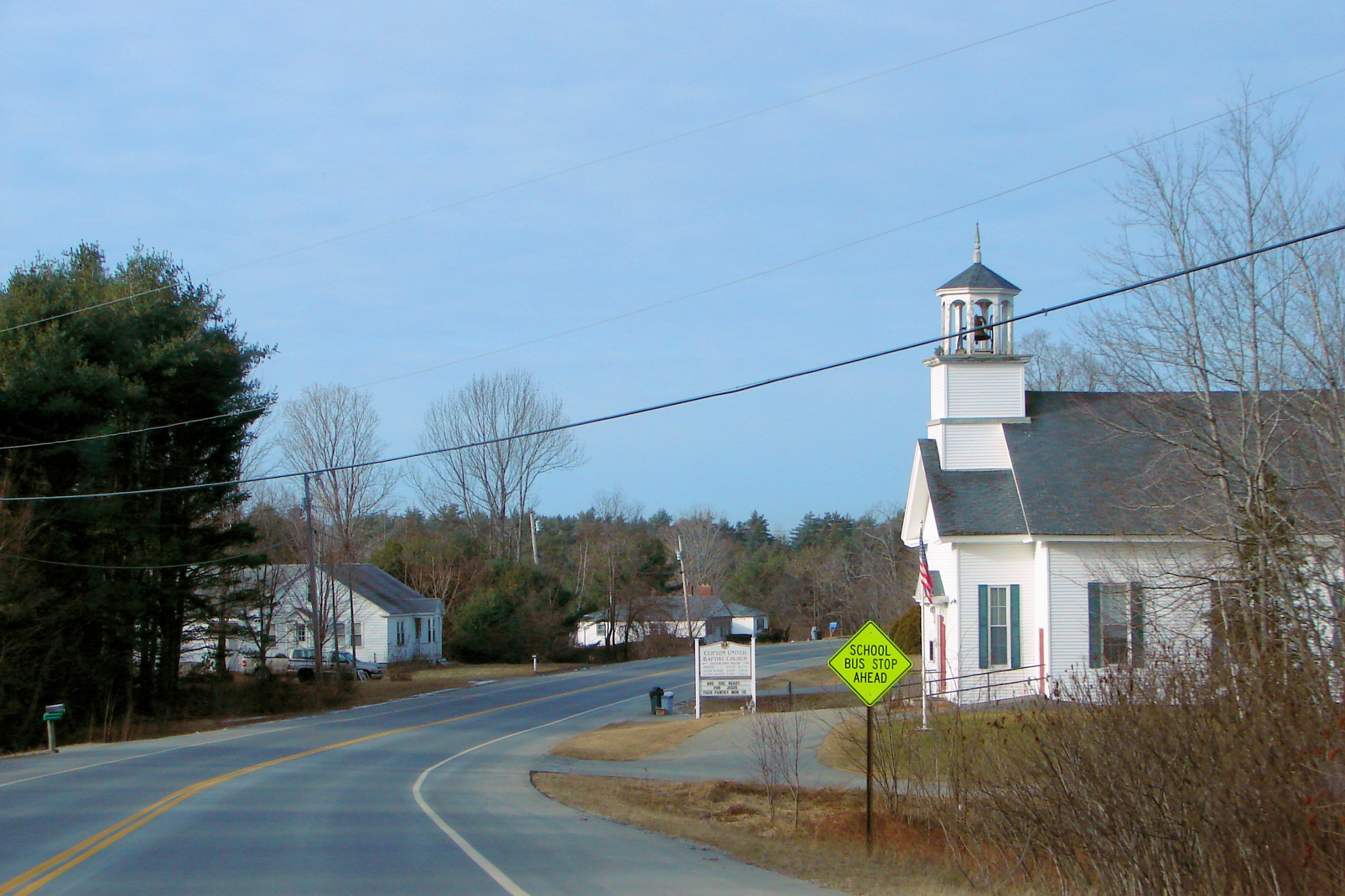
- Clifton, Maine, 2012

- Logo

- Location within Maine Location within the United States
- Coordinates: 44°48′16″N 68°31′37″W
- Country: United States
- State: Maine
- County: Penobscot

Area
  - Total: 35.90 sq mi (92.98 km^{2})
  - Land: 34.53 sq mi (89.43 km^{2})
  - Water: 1.37 sq mi (3.55 km^{2})
- Elevation: 446 ft (136 m)

Population (2020)
  - Total: 840
  - Density: 24/sq mi (9.4/km^{2})
- Time zone: UTC-5 (Eastern (EST))
  - Summer (DST): UTC-4 (EDT)
- ZIP code: 04428
- Area code: 207
- FIPS code: 23-13365
- GNIS feature ID: 582411
- Website: cliftonme.com

Clifton is a small town in the Bangor Metropolitan Statistical Area of Penobscot County, Maine. It occupies 36 square miles (23,000 acres), and had a population was 840 at the 2020 census. It began as farming tracts in the early 1800s, and though the earliest settlers referred to it as "Hillsboro", when the town as incorporated in 1849, it was officially labeled "Clifton" for the cliffs and ledges of the town’s hills. In 2008, Cliffwood Hall and the Harold Allan Schoolhouse were listed on the National Register of Historic Places.

== Cliffwood Hall ==
Cliffwood Hall, formerly known as Clifton Town Hall, is a historic municipal and social meeting hall built in 1892. It is a two-story wood frame structure with a gabled roof, a clapboard siding, a granite foundation, and a modest Italianate styling. It functioned as the town hall and a principal social meeting venue from 1892 to 1999, when it was donated to the Clifton Historical Society. The society used their collection of local historical artifacts to turn the building into the Clifton Town Hall Museum.

== Harold Allen School ==
The Harold Allan School is a historic school building constructed in 1863. It is the town's best-preserved and only surviving district-level one-room schoolhouse. It has a hip-roofed vestibule and extensions, corner pilasters on the main block, and an addition that retains evidence of its original use as a two-seat outhouse. Originally located about 1 mile (1.6 km) east of the Eddington town line, a decline in population and a shift in geographic demographics led to the building's relocation. By the early 1900s, it was one of two schools left in the town until 1966, when the schools were consolidated into a multi-town district. It remained vacant until 1985, when it was acquired by the local historical society in 1999, and is now part of their museum complex. It was listed on the National Register of Historic Places in 2008.

== Demographics ==
Historical population
Census	Pop.	Note	%±
1850	306		—
1860	307		0.3%
1870	348		13.4%
1880	350		0.6%
1890	284		−18.9%
1900	236		−16.9%
1910	217		−8.1%
1920	185		−14.7%
1930	156		−15.7%
1940	168		7.7%
1950	193		14.9%
1960	227		17.6%
1970	233		2.6%
1980	462		98.3%
1990	607		31.4%
2000	743		22.4%
2010	921		24.0%
2020	840		−8.8%
U.S. Decennial Census

=== 2010 census ===
As of the census of 2010, there were 921 people, 346 households, and 256 families living in the town. The population density was 26.7 inhabitants per square mile (10.3/km^{2}). There were 468 housing units at an average density of 13.6 per square mile (5.3/km^{2}). The racial makeup of the town was 95.0% White, 1.1% African American, 1.5% Native American, 0.3% Asian, and 2.1% from two or more races. Hispanic or Latino of any race were 1.0% of the population.

There were 346 households, of which 34.4% had children under the age of 18 living with them, 57.2% were married couples living together, 11.0% had a female householder with no husband present, 5.8% had a male householder with no wife present, and 26.0% were non-families. 18.8% of all households were made up of individuals, and 5.5% had someone living alone who was 65 years of age or older. The average household size was 2.64 and the average family size was 2.93.

The median age in the town was 41.1 years. 23.9% of residents were under the age of 18; 6.9% were between the ages of 18 and 24; 25.5% were from 25 to 44; 33.8% were from 45 to 64; and 10% were 65 years of age or older. The gender makeup of the town was 52.2% male and 47.8% female.

=== 2000 census ===
As of the census of 2000, there were 743 people, 303 households, and 213 families living in the town. The population density was 21.6 inhabitants per square mile (8.3/km^{2}). There were 416 housing units at an average density of 12.1 per square mile (4.7/km^{2}). The racial makeup of the town was 97.85% White, 0.27% African American, 1.08% Native American, 0.13% Asian, 0.13% Pacific Islander, and 0.54% from two or more races. Hispanic or Latino of any race were 0.27% of the population.

There were 303 households, out of which 34.7% had children under the age of 18 living with them, 57.1% were married couples living together, 9.6% had a female householder with no husband present, and 29.4% were non-families. 21.1% of all households were made up of individuals, and 7.3% had someone living alone who was 65 years of age or older. The average household size was 2.45 and the average family size was 2.83.

In the town, the population was spread out, with 24.5% under the age of 18, 6.2% from 18 to 24, 35.8% from 25 to 44, 24.4% from 45 to 64, and 9.2% who were 65 years of age or older. The median age was 38 years. For every 100 females, there were 100.8 males. For every 100 females age 18 and over, there were 98.2 males.

The median income for a household in the town was $36,333, and the median income for a family was $39,000. Males had a median income of $31,065 versus $22,019 for females. The per capita income for the town was $16,380. About 7.0% of families and 8.9% of the population were below the poverty line, including 13.5% of those under age 18 and 3.0% of those age 65 or over.

== Notable person ==
- Donald J. Brooks - COVID-19 Vaccination Data Lead at the World Health Organization
