= Franklin, Maine =

Town in Maine, United States

- Town
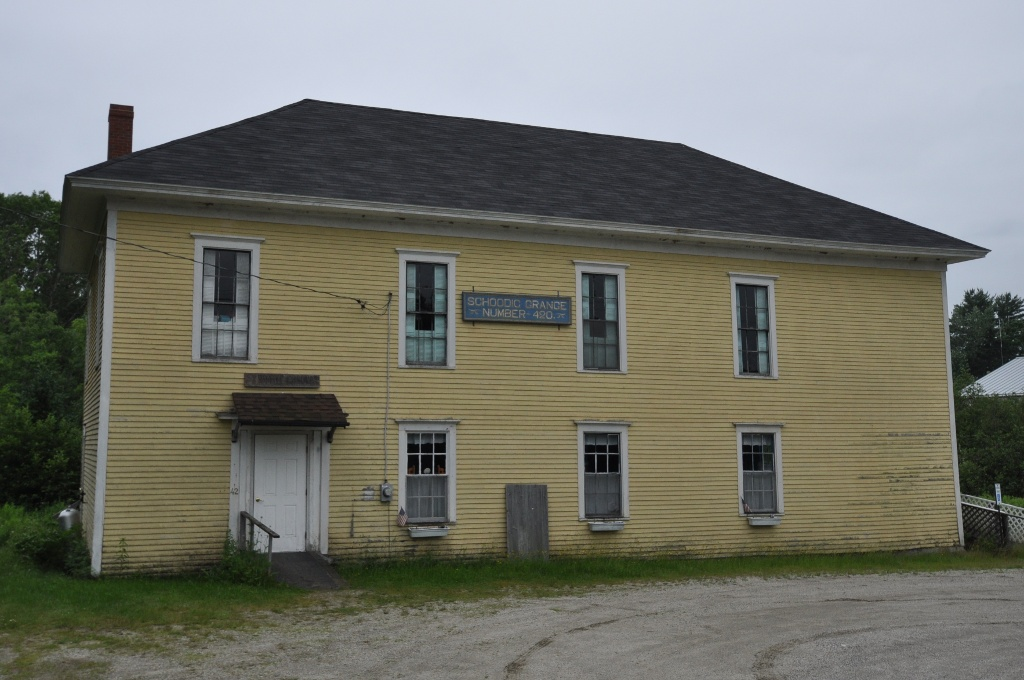
- Schoodic Grange Hall

- Seal Logo

- Location within Maine Location within the United States
- Coordinates: 44°37′25″N 68°14′48″W
- Country: United States
- State: Maine
- County: Hancock
- Villages, hamlets, and neighbourhoods: Franklin; East Franklin; Egypt; West Franklin; Rabbittown; Cards Crossing; George’s Pond; Franklin Foothills; Hog Bay Hills; Donnell’s Pond; West Blackswoods; Macomber Mill; Great Pond; Schoodic Station; Southbay; Alderville; Shipyard Point; Lonely Oaks

Government
  - Type: New England Town Meeting; Select Board

Area
  - Total: 41.43 sq mi (107.30 km^{2})
  - Land: 36.45 sq mi (94.41 km^{2})
  - Water: 4.98 sq mi (12.90 km^{2})
- Elevation: 197 ft (60 m)

Population (2020)
  - Total: 1,567
  - Density: 43/sq mi (16.6/km^{2})
- Time zone: UTC-5 (Eastern (EST))
  - Summer (DST): UTC-4 (EDT)
- ZIP code: 04634
- Area code: 207
- FIPS code: 23-26350
- GNIS feature ID: 582479
- Website: franklinmaine.com

Franklin is a town in Hancock County, Maine, United States. The population was 1,567 at the 2020 census. The town is named for Benjamin Franklin.

== About ==
The first settler, in 1764, was Moses Butler, for whom Butler's Point is named.

Principal products (in chronological order) have been ship masts, railroad ties, granite, blueberries, and Christmas trees.

The town is adjacent to the towns of Hancock, Eastbrook, Sullivan, and the Blackswoods District (Unorganized Territory) and is considered part of the Schoodic Foothills area, named for Schoodic Mountain and the adjacent Schoodic Peninsula. Franklin is a member of the Schoodic Communities School District; its elementary-middle school, and junior high school students attend Mountain View School in neighbouring Sullivan, while its high schoolers may attend Sumner Memorial High School (Regional School Unit 24) in East Sullivan.

The town includes numerous hills, lakes, ponds, blueberry barrens, and scenic vistas of Hogs Bay and the Schoodic Foothills.

The town is governed by an annual open town meeting and a board of selectpersons.

Composed of several villages, hamlets, and neighbourhoods, the town spans much of northern Hog Bay to the south and inland towards the highlands of eastern Hancock County. These include Franklin Village, East Franklin, West Franklin, Egypt, Hog Bay Hills / Johnny's Brook, Shipyard Point, Butler Point, Cards Crossing, George's Pond, Donnell Pond, and Rabbittown.

== Geography ==
According to the United States Census Bureau, the town has a total area of 41.43 square miles (107.30 km^{2}), of which 36.45 square miles (94.41 km^{2}) is land and 4.98 square miles (12.90 km^{2}) is water.

== Demographics ==
Historical population
Census	Pop.	Note	%±
1830	382		—
1840	502		31.4%
1850	736		46.6%
1860	1,004		36.4%
1870	1,042		3.8%
1880	1,102		5.8%
1890	1,264		14.7%
1900	1,201		−5.0%
1910	1,161		−3.3%
1920	925		−20.3%
1930	820		−11.4%
1940	742		−9.5%
1950	709		−4.4%
1960	627		−11.6%
1970	708		12.9%
1980	979		38.3%
1990	1,141		16.5%
2000	1,370		20.1%
2010	1,483		8.2%
2020	1,567		5.7%
U.S. Decennial Census

=== 2010 census ===
As of the census of 2010, there were 1,483 people, 652 households, and 411 families residing in the town. The population density was 40.7 inhabitants per square mile (15.7/km^{2}). There were 1,043 housing units at an average density of 28.6 per square mile (11.0/km^{2}). The racial makeup of the town was 97.3% White, 0.2% African American, 0.8% Native American, 0.7% Asian, and 1.0% from two or more races. Hispanic or Latino people of any race were 0.6% of the population.

There were 652 households, of which 26.5% had children under the age of 18 living with them, 48.9% were married couples living together, 9.7% had a female householder with no husband present, 4.4% had a male householder with no wife present, and 37.0% were non-families. 26.8% of all households were made up of individuals, and 9.5% had someone living alone who was 65 years of age or older. The average household size was 2.26 and the average family size was 2.73.

The median age in the town was 44.6 years. 19.8% of residents were under the age of 18; 6.7% were between the ages of 18 and 24; 24% were from 25 to 44; 34.4% were from 45 to 64; and 15.1% were 65 years of age or older. The gender makeup of the town was 49.2% male and 50.8% female.

=== 2000 census ===
As of the census of 2000, there were 1,370 people, 579 households, and 389 families residing in the town. The population density was 37.3 inhabitants per square mile (14.4/km^{2}). There were 902 housing units at an average density of 24.6 per square mile (9.5/km^{2}). The racial makeup of the town was 95.84% White, 0.07% African American, 0.80% Native American, 0.51% Asian, 0.07% from other races, and 2.70% from two or more races. Hispanic or Latino people of any race were 0.29% of the population.

There were 579 households, out of which 28.7% had children under the age of 18 living with them, 56.1% were married couples living together, 8.3% had a female householder with no husband present, and 32.8% were non-families. 26.4% of all households were made up of individuals, and 10.7% had someone living alone who was 65 years of age or older. The average household size was 2.35 and the average family size was 2.80.

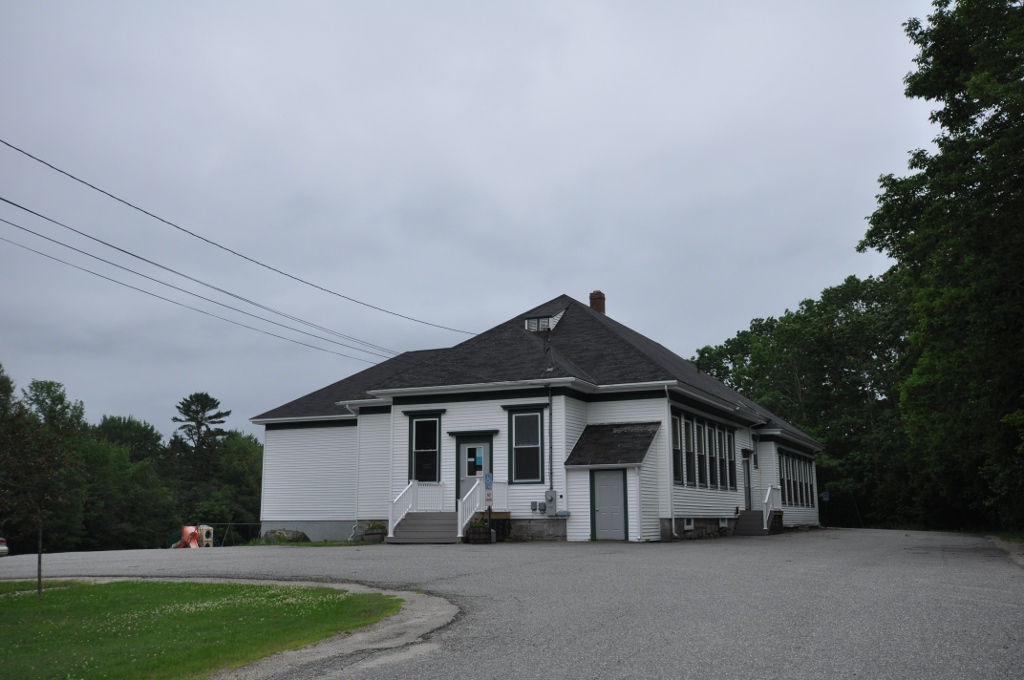
Town offices

In the town, the population was spread out, with 22.6% under the age of 18, 5.8% from 18 to 24, 29.6% from 25 to 44, 27.2% from 45 to 64, and 14.9% who were 65 years of age or older. The median age was 40 years. For every 100 females, there were 98.6 males. For every 100 females age 18 and over, there were 91.7 males.

The median income for a household in the town was $32,070, and the median income for a family was $38,594. Males had a median income of $28,214 versus $19,900 for females. The per capita income for the town was $17,188. About 10.7% of families and 15.9% of the population were below the poverty line, including 15.8% of those under age 18 and 23.4% of those age 65 or over.

== Education ==
The school district is Regional School Unit 24. Two elementary schools cover parts of the town: Cave Hill School in Eastbrook, and Mountain View School in Sullivan. The district's secondary schools, Sumner Middle School and Sumner Memorial High School, are a part of the Sumner Learning Campus in Sullivan.
