= Waltham, Maine =

Town in Maine, United States

- Town
- Location within Maine Location within the United States
- Coordinates: 44°41′17″N 68°20′25″W
- Country: United States
- State: Maine
- County: Hancock

Area
  - Total: 32.89 sq mi (85.18 km^{2})
  - Land: 29.67 sq mi (76.84 km^{2})
  - Water: 3.22 sq mi (8.34 km^{2})
- Elevation: 144 ft (44 m)

Population (2020)
  - Total: 332
  - Density: 11/sq mi (4.3/km^{2})
- Time zone: UTC-5 (Eastern (EST))
  - Summer (DST): UTC-4 (EDT)
- ZIP Code: 04605
- Area code: 207
- FIPS code: 23-80040
- GNIS feature ID: 582789
- Website: www.walthammaine.org

Waltham is a town in Hancock County, Maine, United States. The population was 332 at the 2020 census.

== Geography ==
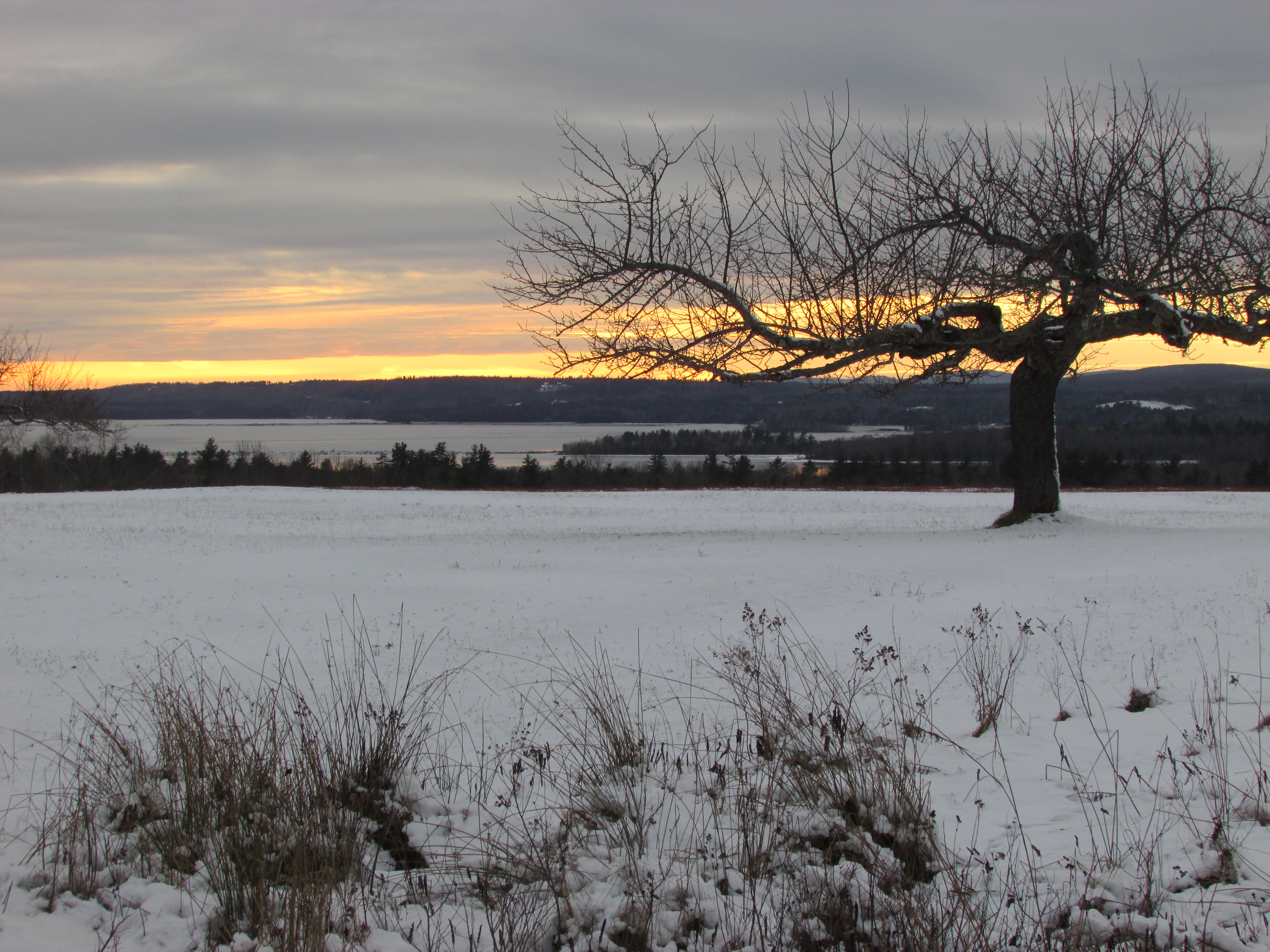
Graham Lake, pictured in Waltham, Maine.

According to the United States Census Bureau, the town has a total area of 32.89 square miles (85.18 km^{2}), of which 29.67 square miles (76.84 km^{2}) is land and 3.22 square miles (8.34 km^{2}) is water.

== Demographics ==
Historical population
| Census | Pop. | Note | %± |
|---|---|---|---|
| 1840 | 231 | | — |
| 1850 | 304 | | 31.6% |
| 1860 | 374 | | 23.0% |
| 1870 | 366 | | −2.1% |
| 1880 | 296 | | −19.1% |
| 1890 | 242 | | −18.2% |
| 1900 | 192 | | −20.7% |
| 1910 | 182 | | −5.2% |
| 1920 | 154 | | −15.4% |
| 1930 | 135 | | −12.3% |
| 1940 | 157 | | 16.3% |
| 1950 | 154 | | −1.9% |
| 1960 | 153 | | −0.6% |
| 1970 | 167 | | 9.2% |
| 1980 | 186 | | 11.4% |
| 1990 | 276 | | 48.4% |
| 2000 | 306 | | 10.9% |
| 2010 | 353 | | 15.4% |
| 2020 | 332 | | −5.9% |
U.S. Decennial Census

=== 2010 census ===
As of the census of 2010, there were 353 people, 150 households, and 103 families living in the town. The population density was 11.9 inhabitants per square mile (4.6/km^{2}). There were 206 housing units at an average density of 6.9 per square mile (2.7/km^{2}). The racial makeup of the town was 99.7% White and 0.3% from two or more races. Hispanic or Latino of any race were 0.6% of the population.

There were 150 households, of which 22.7% had children under the age of 18 living with them, 54.0% were married couples living together, 10.0% had a female householder with no husband present, 4.7% had a male householder with no wife present, and 31.3% were non-families. 22.7% of all households were made up of individuals, and 8% had someone living alone who was 65 years of age or older. The average household size was 2.35 and the average family size was 2.70.

The median age in the town was 47.2 years. 15.3% of residents were under the age of 18; 9.6% were between the ages of 18 and 24; 20.9% were from 25 to 44; 38.8% were from 45 to 64; and 15.3% were 65 years of age or older. The gender makeup of the town was 50.1% male and 49.9% female.

=== 2000 census ===
As of the census of 2000, there were 306 people, 111 households, and 80 families living in the town. The population density was 10.3 people per square mile (4.0/km^{2}). There were 176 housing units at an average density of 5.9 per square mile (2.3/km^{2}). The racial makeup of the town was 98.69% White, 0.33% Asian, 0.33% from other races, and 0.65% from two or more races. Hispanic or Latino of any race were 0.33% of the population.

There were 111 households, out of which 37.8% had children under the age of 18 living with them, 58.6% were married couples living together, 7.2% had a female householder with no husband present, and 27.9% were non-families. 15.3% of all households were made up of individuals, and 5.4% had someone living alone who was 65 years of age or older. The average household size was 2.76 and the average family size was 3.10.

In the town, the population was spread out, with 28.4% under the age of 18, 10.1% from 18 to 24, 31.7% from 25 to 44, 21.9% from 45 to 64, and 7.8% who were 65 years of age or older. The median age was 36 years. For every 100 females, there were 109.6 males. For every 100 females age 18 and over, there were 104.7 males.

The median income for a household in the town was $39,167, and the median income for a family was $40,313. Males had a median income of $23,438 versus $20,625 for females. The per capita income for the town was $13,467. About 15.1% of families and 13.9% of the population were below the poverty line, including 12.8% of those under the age of eighteen and 14.3% of those 65 or over.

== Education ==
The school district is Regional School Unit 24. The zoned elementary school is Cave Hill School in Eastbrook. The district's secondary schools, Sumner Middle School and Sumner Memorial High School, are a part of the Sumner Learning Campus in Sullivan.
