= Mariaville, Maine =

Town in Maine, United States

- Town
- Location within Maine Location within the United States
- Coordinates: 44°44′43″N 68°22′24″W
- Country: United States
- State: Maine
- County: Hancock

Area
  - Total: 46.83 sq mi (121.29 km^{2})
  - Land: 38.69 sq mi (100.21 km^{2})
  - Water: 8.14 sq mi (21.08 km^{2})
- Elevation: 121 ft (37 m)

Population (2020)
  - Total: 472
  - Density: 12/sq mi (4.7/km^{2})
- Time zone: UTC-5 (Eastern (EST))
  - Summer (DST): UTC-4 (EDT)
- ZIP code: 04605
- Area code: 207
- FIPS code: 23-43430
- GNIS feature ID: 582580
- Website: www.mariavilleme.gov

Mariaville is a town in Hancock County, Maine, United States. The population was 472 at the 2020 census.

== History ==
Mariaville was incorporated in 1836. The town was named for Maria Matilda Bingham, the second daughter of William Bingham, a wealthy nonresident slave owner and early U.S. senator from Pennsylvania.

== Geography ==
According to the United States Census Bureau, the town has a total area of 46.83 square miles (121.29 km^{2}), of which 38.69 square miles (100.21 km^{2}) is land and 8.14 square miles (21.08 km^{2}) is water.

== Demographics ==
Historical population
Census	Pop.	Note	%±
1810	224		—
1840	275		—
1850	374		36.0%
1860	458		22.5%
1870	369		−19.4%
1880	382		3.5%
1890	271		−29.1%
1900	218		−19.6%
1910	171		−21.6%
1920	131		−23.4%
1930	155		18.3%
1940	132		−14.8%
1950	153		15.9%
1960	144		−5.9%
1970	108		−25.0%
1980	168		55.6%
1990	270		60.7%
2000	414		53.3%
2010	513		23.9%
2020	472		−8.0%
U.S. Decennial Census

=== 2010 census ===
As of the 2010 census, there were 513 people, 208 households, and 142 families living in the town. The population density was 13.3 inhabitants per square mile (5.1/km^{2}). There were 416 housing units at an average density of 10.8 per square mile (4.2/km^{2}). The racial makeup of the town was 97.3% White, 0.4% African American, 1.2% Native American, 0.4% Asian, 0.2% from other races, and 0.6% from two or more races. Hispanic or Latino people of any race were 1.8% of the population.

There were 208 households, of which 33.2% had children under the age of 18 living with them, 56.7% were married couples living together, 5.3% had a female householder with no husband present, 6.3% had a male householder with no wife present, and 31.7% were non-families. 21.6% of all households were made up of individuals, and 3.3% had someone living alone who was 65 years of age or older. The average household size was 2.47 and the average family size was 2.87.

The median age in the town was 43.5 years. 22.2% of residents were under the age of 18; 7.6% were between the ages of 18 and 24; 22.7% were from 25 to 44; 39.8% were from 45 to 64; and 7.8% were 65 years of age or older. The gender makeup of the town was 54.2% male and 45.8% female.

=== 2000 census ===
As of the census of 2000, there were 414 people, 149 households, and 105 families living in the town. The population density was 10.6 inhabitants per square mile (4.1/km^{2}). There were 318 housing units at an average density of 8.2 per square mile (3.2/km^{2}). The racial makeup of the town was 99.52% White and 0.48% Asian.

There were 149 households, out of which 40.3% had children under the age of 18 living with them, 60.4% were married couples living together, 4.7% had a female householder with no husband present, and 29.5% were non-families. 22.1% of all households were made up of individuals, and 2.0% had someone living alone who was 65 years of age or older. The average household size was 2.78 and the average family size was 3.26.

In the town, the population was spread out, with 32.4% under the age of 18, 5.6% from 18 to 24, 33.6% from 25 to 44, 23.2% from 45 to 64, and 5.3% who were 65 years of age or older. The median age was 35 years. For every 100 females, there were 106.0 males. For every 100 females age 18 and over, there were 98.6 males.

The median income for a household in the town was $31,250, and the median income for a family was $40,417. Males had a median income of $29,545 versus $17,500 for females. The per capita income for the town was $13,931. About 12.5% of families and 12.4% of the population were below the poverty line, including 15.1% of those under age 18 and 47.4% of those age 65 or over.

== Politics ==
Mariaville city vote by party in presidential elections
Year	Democratic	Republican	Third parties
2016	31.16% 91	56.51% 165	12.33% 36
2012	43.77% 123	50.53% 142	5.69% 16
2008	43.77% 116	54.72% 145	1.51% 4
1984	30.21% 29	69.79% 67	0.00% 0
1980	32.97% 30	57.15% 52	9.89% 9
1976	39.39% 26	57.58% 38	3.03% 2
1972	26.67% 12	73.33% 33	0.00% 0
1968	31.82% 14	54.55% 24	13.64% 6
1964	47.92% 23	52.08% 25	0.00% 0
1960	19.64% 11	80.36% 45	0.00% 0
1956	9.09% 4	90.91% 40	0.00% 0
1952	20.83% 10	79.17% 38	0.00% 0
1948	30.23% 13	67.44% 29	2.33% 1
1944	30.77% 16	69.23% 36	0.00% 0
1940	34.48% 20	65.52% 38	0.00% 0
1936	35.71% 20	64.29% 36	0.00% 0
1932	44.00% 22	56.00% 28	0.00% 0
1928	4.26% 2	95.74% 45	0.00% 0
1924	17.14% 6	82.86% 29	0.00% 0
1920	31.58% 12	68.42% 26	0.00% 0
1916	31.58% 12	68.42% 26	0.00% 0

== Education ==
The school district is Regional School Unit 24. The zoned elementary school is Cave Hill School in Eastbrook. The district's secondary schools, Sumner Middle School and Sumner Memorial High School, are a part of the Sumner Learning Campus in Sullivan.
