= Maine State Route 198 =

State highway in Hancock County, Maine, US

State Route 198

Route information
- Maintained by MaineDOT
- Length: 10.69 mi (17.20 km)

Major junctions
- South end: Summit Street / Main Street in Village of Northeast Harbor
- North end: SR 3 / SR 102 in Bar Harbor

Location
- Country: United States
- State: Maine
- Counties: Hancock

Highway system
- Maine State Highway System; Interstate; US; State; Auto trails; Lettered highways
← SR 197	→ SR 199

State Route 198 (SR 198) is a state highway on Mount Desert Island, Hancock County, Maine. It goes from the village of Northeast Harbor within the town of Mount Desert to State Routes 3 and 102 in Bar Harbor. The route passes near the Gulf of Maine and through Acadia National Park.

== Route description ==
SR 198 begins in the village of Northeast Harbor. It heads northward and has a concurrency with SR 3 from Northeast Harbor and intersects SR 233. Near Somesville, SR 3 ends but SR 198 turns north along the route of SR 102. SR 198 and SR 102 run together for four miles (6.4 km) and enter Bar Harbor. Both routes have their northern end at SR 3.

== Major junctions ==
The entire route is in Hancock County.

Location	mi	km	Destinations	Notes
Mount Desert	0.00	0.00	Summit Road / Main Street	
Mount Desert	0.82	1.32	SR 3 west (Peabody Drive)	Southern end of SR 3 concurrency
Mount Desert	5.09	8.19	SR 233 east (Eagle Lake Road) – Bar Harbor	Western terminus of SR 233
Mount Desert	6.47	10.41	SR 3 ends (Main Street) / SR 102 south – Somesville, Southwest Harbor	Northern end of SR 3 concurrency; southern end of SR 102 concurrency
Bar Harbor	10.69	17.20	SR 3 (Bar Harbor Road) / SR 102 ends – Ellsworth, Bar Harbor	Northern end of SR 102 concurrency
1.000 mi = 1.609 km; 1.000 km = 0.621 mi: Concurrency terminus
