= New Gloucester Village Store =

Historic building in New Gloucester, Maine

- Interactive map of the New Gloucester Village Store area

General information
- Location: 405 Intervale Road (Maine State Route 231), New Gloucester, Maine, United States
- Coordinates: 43.96273°N 70.28115°W
- Completed: 1890 (136 years ago)

New Gloucester Village Store is a historic building in New Gloucester, Maine, built in 1890. It is part of the New Gloucester Historic District.

Located on Intervale Road (Maine State Route 231) at its intersection with Gloucester Hill Road and Cobbs Bridge Road, it originally served as an important meeting and marketplace for the community. It also served as the neighborhood post office. As of 2025, the building is vacant, having previously been Intervale Pizza.

Between 2008 and 2022, it was New Gloucester Village Store, owned by New Gloucester native Sam Coggeshall. Coggeshall will reopen the store in May 2026.

A television commercial for Humpty Dumpty Snack Foods was shot at the location in the 1990s.
