= Maine State Route 3 =

State highway in Kennebec, Waldo, and Hancock counties in Maine, US

State Route 3

Route information
- Maintained by MaineDOT
- Length: 120.67 mi (194.20 km)
- Existed: 1933–present

Major junctions
- West end: SR 8 / SR 11 / SR 27 in Augusta
- I-95 in Augusta; US 201 / SR 100 in Augusta; US 202 / SR 9 from Augusta to China; US 1 from Belfast to Ellsworth; SR 15 from Bucksport to Orland; SR 102 / SR 198 in Bar Harbor
- East end: SR 102 / SR 198 in Mount Desert

Location
- Country: United States
- State: Maine
- Counties: Kennebec, Waldo, Hancock

Highway system
- Maine State Highway System; Interstate; US; State; Auto trails; Lettered highways
← US 2A	→ SR 4

State Route 3 (SR 3) is a 120.67-mile-long (194.20 km) state highway located in central and eastern Maine. It is a major interregional highway, connecting the Interstate 95 corridor to the Atlantic coast. The western terminus is at SR 8, SR 11 and SR 27 in Augusta and the eastern terminus is at SR 102 and SR 198 in Mount Desert. Major cities and towns along the length of SR 3 include Augusta, Belfast, Ellsworth, and Bar Harbor.

== Route description ==
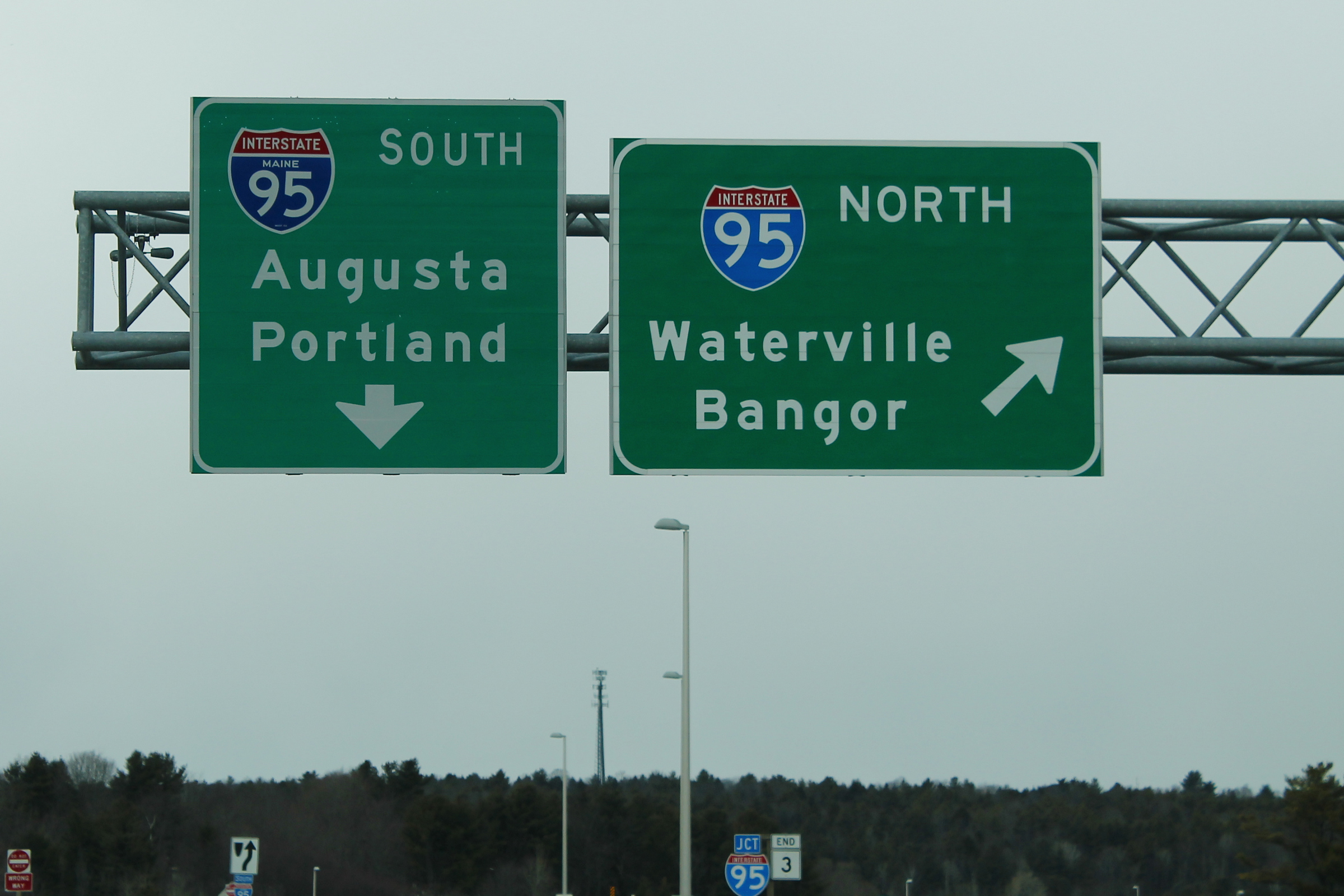
Western terminus in Augusta in 2013, before extension to Civic Center Drive was completed

SR 3 begins at Civic Center Drive (SR 8/SR 11/SR 27) in the northwest corner of Augusta. SR 3 heads east using the Augusta Bypass, a controlled-access road completed in 2004 to alleviate congestion in the city center caused by traffic headed to and from I-95. The bypass ends at North Belfast Avenue (US 202/SR 9) on the east end of Augusta. SR 3 runs concurrently with US 202 and SR 9 (the Belfast Road) to the village of South China, where US 202 and SR 9 split to the north. SR 3 continues east to the city of Belfast, where it interchanges with US 1 west of downtown.

US 1 and SR 3 run concurrently for over 39 miles (63 km) from Belfast through Bucksport, crossing the Penobscot Narrows Bridge over the Penobscot River. SR 15 joins US 1 and SR 3 in downtown Bucksport and splits to the south in Orland after 4.4 miles (7.1 km). US 1 and SR 3 continue along the Acadia Highway to the city of Ellsworth.

SR 3 leaves US 1 at The Triangle, an intersection at the south end of Ellsworth that has been the center of numerous traffic problems within that city. Entering the Trenton township, the remainder of the route is designated as the Acadia All-American Road. Continuing south through Trenton, the route crosses a causeway to Mount Desert Island and intersects with SR 102 and SR 198, which run along the island's western side.

SR 3 turns east follows the eastern shore to the tourist town of Bar Harbor, then continues south through Acadia National Park to the village of Northeast Harbor. SR 3 intersects with SR 198 and turns north towards the village of Somesville. SR 3 and SR 198 intersect with SR 102 in Somesville; SR 3 ends and SR 198 turns north onto SR 102, eventually meeting SR 3 again near the Mount Desert Island causeway.

On the southern end of Mount Desert Island, and along the concurrency with SR 198, SR 3 signs lack directional indicators. This was intentionally done to avoid confusion, as a motorist on the southern part of the island driving on SR 3 westbound is actually traveling east (and vice versa). SR 3 signs along this stretch have "Route" in place of directional banners. Directional signs begin appearing westbound and stop appearing eastbound just east of Seal Harbor when the highway begins to loop around the island.

== History ==
When originally designated in 1933, the western terminus of SR 3 was located in downtown Portland. It was cosigned on sections of SR 26, SR 4 and SR 11 between Portland and Augusta. In 1946-7, the western portion of the route was truncated to Augusta and its western terminus was moved to the intersection of Bangor Street and North Belfast Avenue, where it began cosigned with US 202 and SR 9.

In 2004, the Augusta Bypass was completed, providing a connection between I-95 and points east which bypasses downtown Augusta. SR 3 was rerouted onto the new bypass, proceeding northwest to a new interchange at exit 113. The bypass connected to North Belfast Avenue where SR 3 joined US 202/SR 9 and continued its existing route eastward.

In 2013, the bypass was extended west of I-95 to connect with Old Belgrade Road and serve the new Alfond Center for Health and Cancer Center. The Exit 113 interchange was reconfigured to provide full access and SR 3 was extended along the northern segment of Old Belgrade Road to its present western terminus at Civic Center Drive (SR 8/SR 11/SR 27).

== Junction list ==
County	Location	mi	km	Destinations	Notes
Kennebec	Augusta	0.00	0.00	SR 8 / SR 11 / SR 27 (Civic Center Drive) – Augusta, Belgrade, Farmington	Western terminus
Kennebec	Augusta	1.04– 1.57	1.67– 2.53	I-95 – Gardiner, Waterville	Exit 113 on I-95
Kennebec	Augusta	2.21	3.56	SR 104 (West River Road) – Sidney, Augusta Riverfront, Cancer Center	
Kennebec	Augusta	3.25	5.23	US 201 / SR 100 (Riverside Drive) – Winslow, Augusta East Side Business District, Camden, Rockland	
Kennebec	Augusta	4.13	6.65	US 202 / SR 9 west (North Belfast Avenue) – South China, Belfast	Western terminus of US 202 / SR 9 concurrency
Kennebec	China	13.34	21.47	SR 32 north (Vassalboro Road) – Winslow	Western terminus of SR 32 concurrency
Kennebec	China	14.60	23.50	SR 32 south (Windsor Road) – Windsor	Eastern terminus of SR 32 concurrency
Kennebec	China	14.82	23.85	US 202 / SR 9 east (Lakeview Drive) – China, Bangor	Eastern terminus of US 202 / SR 9 concurrency
Waldo	Liberty	29.84	48.02	SR 220 – Liberty, Thorndike	
Waldo	Belmont	40.05– 40.13	64.45– 64.58	SR 131 (Searsmont Road / Morrill Road) – Searsmont, Union	Brief concurrency with SR 131
Waldo	Belfast	46.05– 46.10	74.11– 74.19	US 1 south to SR 52 – Camden, Rockland	Western terminus of US 1 concurrency
Waldo	Belfast	46.60– 46.91	75.00– 75.49	SR 7 north / SR 137 west (Waldo Avenue) – Belfast, Brooks, Freedom	Interchange; westbound exit and eastbound entrance via High Street; southern terminus of SR 7 / eastern terminus of SR 137
Waldo	Belfast	47.40	76.28	SR 141 north (Swan Lake Avenue) – Swanville	Southern terminus of SR 141
Waldo	Stockton Springs	56.83	91.46	US 1A north (Bangor Road) – Winterport, Bangor	Southern terminus of US 1A
Waldo	Prospect	62.94	101.29	SR 174 west (Fort Knox Road) – Fort Knox	Eastern terminus of SR 174
Penobscot River		63.05– 63.26	101.47– 101.81	Penobscot Narrows Bridge	
Hancock	Bucksport	64.51	103.82	SR 15 north (Main Street) – Bucksport, Bangor	Western terminus of SR 15 concurrency
Hancock	Orland	65.66	105.67	SR 46 north (Duck Cove Road) – Dedham, East Holden	Southern terminus of SR 46
Hancock	Orland	66.28	106.67	SR 175 south (Castine Road) to SR 166 – Orland, Castine	Northern terminus of SR 175
Hancock	Orland	68.91	110.90	SR 15 south (Front Ridge Road) – Penobscot, Blue Hill, Deer Isle	Eastern terminus of SR 15 concurrency
Hancock	Orland	73.09	117.63	SR 176 west (Surry Road) – Surry	Eastern terminus of SR 176
Hancock	Ellsworth	83.45	134.30	SR 172 south (West Main Street) – Blue Hill, Surry	Northern terminus of SR 172
Hancock	Ellsworth	83.65	134.62	SR 230 south (Water Street) – Trenton	Northern terminus of SR 230
Hancock	Ellsworth	83.93	135.07	US 1A west (Oak Street) – Bangor	Eastern terminus of US 1A
Hancock	Ellsworth	84.91– 85.64	136.65– 137.82	US 1 north (Downeast Highway) – Calais	Eastern terminus of US 1 concurrency
Hancock	Trenton	88.48	142.39	SR 204 east (Jordan River Road) – Lamoine	Western terminus of SR 204
Hancock	Trenton	92.14	148.28	SR 230 north (Oak Point Road) – Trenton	Southern terminus of SR 230
Hancock	Bar Harbor	93.37– 93.51	150.26– 150.49	SR 102 / SR 198 south (Main Street) – Northeast Harbor, Southwest Harbor	Northern terminus of SR 102 / SR 198
Hancock	Bar Harbor	103.44	166.47	SR 233 west (Eagle Lake Road) – Cadillac Mountain, Southwest Harbor	Eastern terminus of SR 233
Hancock	Mount Desert	115.04	185.14	SR 198 south (Harborside Road) – Northeast Harbor	Southern terminus of SR 198 concurrency
Hancock	Mount Desert	119.31	192.01	SR 233 east (Eagle Lake Road) – Bar Harbor	Western terminus of SR 233
Hancock	Mount Desert	120.67	194.20	SR 102 / SR 198 north (Main Street) – Ellsworth, Somesville, Southwest Harbor	Eastern terminus
1.000 mi = 1.609 km; 1.000 km = 0.621 mi: Concurrency terminus

== See also ==
- List of state highways in Maine
