= Maine State Route 230 =

State Highway located in Central Costal Maine

State Route 230

Route information
- Maintained by MaineDOT
- Length: 14.15 mi (22.77 km)
- Existed: 1946–present

Major junctions
- South end: SR 3 in Trenton
- North end: US 1 / SR 3 in Ellsworth

Location
- Country: United States
- State: Maine
- Counties: Hancock

Highway system
- Maine State Highway System; Interstate; US; State; Auto trails; Lettered highways
← SR 229	→ SR 231

State Route 230 (SR 230) is a 14.15-mile-long (22.77 km) state highway located in Hancock County in central coastal Maine. Its southern terminus is at State Route 3 in Trenton, and its northern terminus is at U.S. Route 1 and State Route 3 in Ellsworth. SR 230 serves as a coastal alternate to SR 3 running along the Mount Desert Narrows and Union River. It is signed as a north–south highway, but occupies an L-shaped alignment running west, southwest, then north.

== Route description ==
SR 230 begins at SR 3 in Trenton near Hancock County-Bar Harbor Airport, just north of the bridge approach to Mount Desert Island. The highway proceeds directly west (signed north), running along the north side of Goose Cove. At Goose Cove Road, a bypass of the southernmost part of SR 230, the highway turns south towards Oak Point and the Mount Desert Narrows. Approximately 0.6 miles (0.97 km) north of the shore's edge at Oak Point, SR 230 leaves Oak Point Road and makes a sharp turn directly north on Bayside Road. The highway runs north along the Union River Bay, which transitions into the river proper as SR 230 crosses into the city of Ellsworth. SR 230 becomes Water Street as it proceeds into the downtown area, then terminates at US 1 / SR 3 (Main Street).

== History ==
The entire length of SR 230 was originally designated as an extension of SR 102 in 1936. However, in 1946, SR 102 was truncated to its current northern terminus at SR 3 in Bar Harbor. The remaining stretch of SR 102 was redesignated as SR 230, excluding its former concurrency with SR 3. The route has not changed since.

== Major junctions ==
The entire route is in Hancock County.

Location	mi	km	Destinations	Notes
Trenton	0.00	0.00	SR 3 (Bar Harbor Road) – Ellsworth, Bar Harbor	Southern terminus
Ellsworth	14.15	22.77	US 1 / SR 3 (Main Street) / State Street	Northern terminus
1.000 mi = 1.609 km; 1.000 km = 0.621 mi
