= New Gloucester Historic District =

Historic district in Maine, United States

- U.S. National Register of Historic Places
- U.S. Historic district
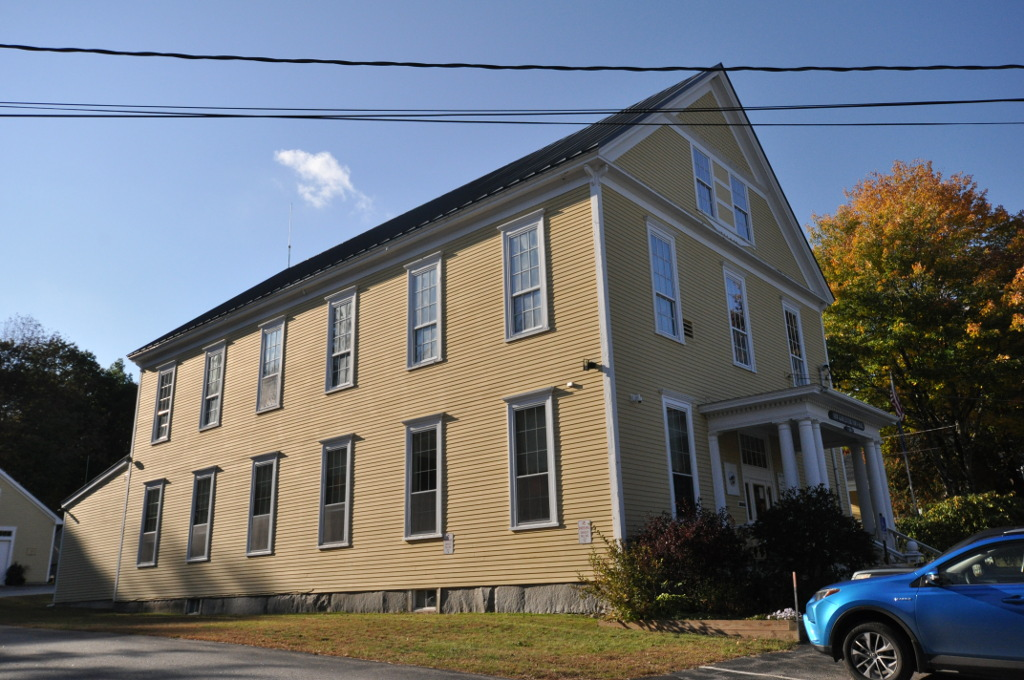
- New Gloucester Town Hall, pictured in 2018

- Location within Maine Location within the United States
- Location: SR 231, Gloucester Hill Rd., and Cobbs Bridge Rd., New Gloucester, Maine
- Coordinates: 43°57′41″N 70°16′58″W
- Area: 275 acres (111 ha)
- Architectural style: Federal, Mixed (More Than 2 Styles From Different Periods)
- NRHP reference No.: 74000162
- Added to NRHP: November 13, 1974

The New Gloucester Historic District encompasses the rural village center of New Gloucester, Maine. The village is one of the few in Maine's inland areas to be settled in the second half of the 18th century, and has a significant concentration of 18th-century residences. It was added to the National Register of Historic Places in 1974.

== Description and history ==
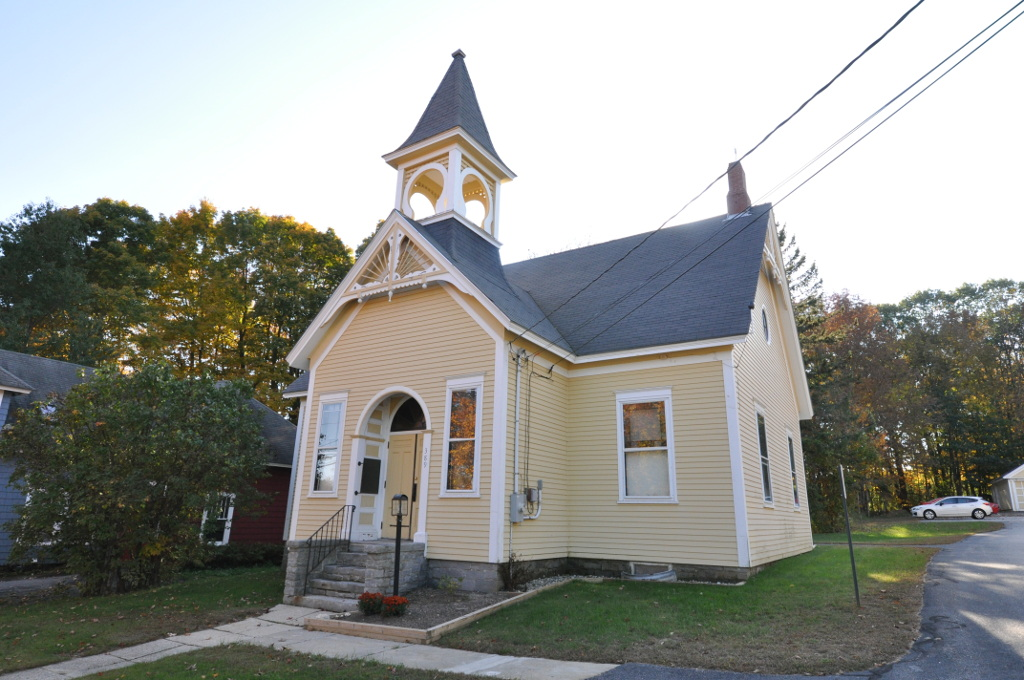
New Gloucester meetinghouse

The town of New Gloucester is located in northern Cumberland County, northwest of the coastal communities of Freeport and Brunswick. It was chartered in 1735, and first settled in 1742. When King George's War broke out in 1744, it was abandoned because of Native American attacks, and was not resettled until 1753. Its first wood-frame house, built in 1761 by Isaac Parsons, still stands in the village center. The town was incorporated in 1794, and has always been a predominantly rural agricultural community.

The town center is a rural, dispersed village, centered at the junction Maine State Route 231 with Gloucester Hill Road and Cobbs Bridge Road. SR 231 roughly follows the first major route to the coast, joining the village to Yarmouth in 1756. Stretched along these roads are a significant number of wood-frame houses, many of them built before 1810 and exhibiting Georgian or Federal styling. Also included are a 1782 tavern, the town's first cemetery, and the site of a blockhouse (now marked by a reduced-size replica) built following the town's resettlement in 1753. Public buildings in the district are generally of later construction, including the 1838 Greek Revival Congregational Church (built on the site of the town's first church), and its town hall, library, and first high school, all built around the turn of the 20th century.

The New Gloucester Village Store is a historic building constructed in 1890, and is part of New Gloucester Historic District.

Located on Intervale Road (Maine State Route 231) at its intersection with Gloucester Hill Road and Cobbs Bridge Road, it originally served as an important meeting and marketplace for the community serving their food and hardware needs. The business was Starbird and Bennett initially, then the New Gloucester Farmer's Union from approximately 1919-1969, and then Peaco's Market for the 1970s, before becoming a village store.

Between 2008 and 2022, it was the New Gloucester Village Store, owned by New Gloucester native Sam Coggeshall, who installed a large wood-fired brick-oven and expanded the market into the building's lower level. The New Gloucester Village Store's planned reopening is for April of 2026.

A television commercial for Humpty Dumpty Snack Foods was shot at the location in the 1990s.

== See also ==
- National Register of Historic Places listings in Cumberland County, Maine
