= Maine State Route 233 =

State highway in Hancock County, Maine, US

State Route 233

Route information
- Maintained by MaineDOT
- Length: 5.84 mi (9.40 km)
- Existed: 1956–present

Major junctions
- West end: SR 3 / SR 198 in Mount Desert
- East end: SR 3 in Bar Harbor

Location
- Country: United States
- State: Maine
- Counties: Hancock

Highway system
- Maine State Highway System; Interstate; US; State; Auto trails; Lettered highways
| ← SR 232 | → SR 234 |

State Route 233 (SR 233) is a state highway located on Mount Desert Island on the southern central coast of Maine. Its western terminus is at SR 3 and SR 198 in the town of Mount Desert. It runs for 5.84 miles (9.40 km) across the island to Bar Harbor, where it terminates at SR 3. SR 233 services Acadia National Park and provides a direct connection between Mount Desert and Bar Harbor, bypassing a 15.4-mile (24.8 km) section of SR 3 which loops the perimeter of the eastern lobe of the island. It is locally named Eagle Lake Road.

== Route description ==
SR 233 begins at SR 3/SR 198 (Sound Drive) in Mount Desert 1.3 miles (2.1 km) east of SR 102, the main highway connecting to points north. The winding highway cuts directly across the center of the island to Bar Harbor, where it terminates at SR 3 in the town center. The headquarters of Acadia National Park and an access point to its carriage road network are located on SR 233.

== History ==
SR 233 was designated in 1956 over entirely new routing. Its alignment has not changed since.

== Major intersections ==
The entire route is in Hancock County.

| Location | mi | km | Destinations | Notes |
|---|---|---|---|---|
| Mount Desert | 0.00 | 0.00 | SR 3 / SR 198 (Sound Drive) – Northeast Harbor, Southwest Harbor, Ellsworth | |
| Bar Harbor | 5.84 | 9.40 | SR 3 (Eden Street / Mount Desert Street) / Kebo Street – Bar Harbor, Ellsworth | |
1.000 mi = 1.609 km; 1.000 km = 0.621 mi
