= Maine State Route 102 =

State highway in Hancock County, Maine, US

State Route 102
- SR 102 in red, SR 102A in blue

Route information
- Maintained by MaineDOT
- Length: 12.86 mi (20.70 km)
- Existed: 1925, 2007 (current alignment)–present

Major junctions
- South end: SR 102A in Tremont
- SR 3 / SR 198 in Mount Desert
- North end: SR 3 / SR 198 in Bar Harbor

Location
- Country: United States
- State: Maine
- Counties: Hancock

Highway system
- Maine State Highway System; Interstate; US; State; Auto trails; Lettered highways
← SR 101	→ SR 103

State Route 102 (SR 102) is a north-south state highway located on Mount Desert Island in eastern Maine. As of 2007, its southern terminus is located at an intersection with SR 102A in Tremont on the southern part of the island. Its northern terminus is at intersection with SR 3 in Bar Harbor, a terminus it shares with SR 198.

== Route description ==
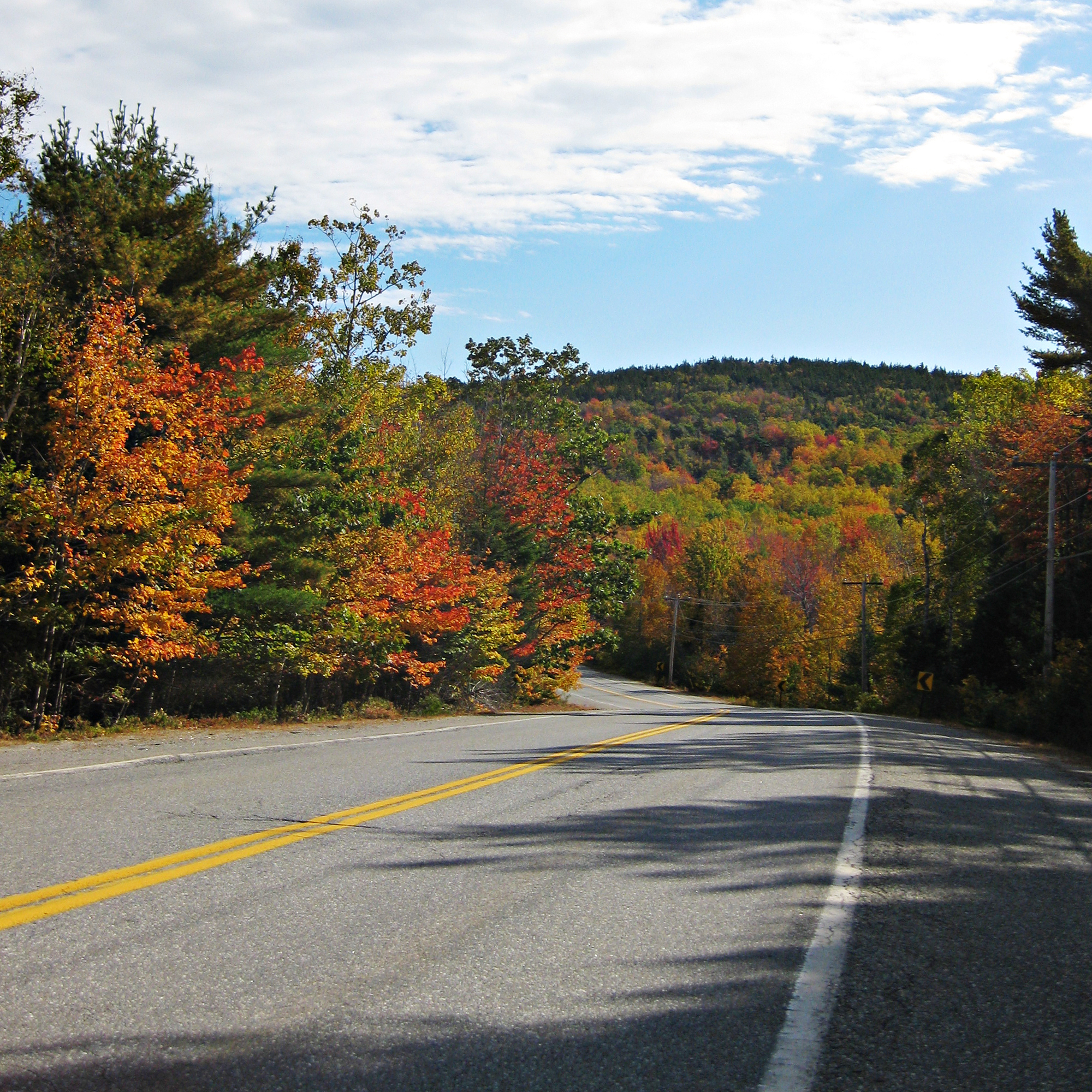
SR 102 passing through Acadia National Park

SR 102 begins in the south at the intersection of Harbor Drive and Tremont Road in Tremont. SR 102A also has its signed northern terminus (geographically western) at this intersection. SR 102 runs due north, entering Southwest Harbor and intersecting the other end of SR 102A south of the town center. Continuing north, SR 102 enters the town of Mount Desert and Acadia National Park. Near Somesville, SR 102 intersects its former western loop on the island and later intersects SR 3/SR 198 near the Mount Desert Campground. SR 3 has its eastern terminus at this intersection, but is generally not assigned cardinal directions as it loops the eastern half Mount Desert Island in order to avoid confusion. Heading north, SR 102 is concurrent with SR 198 as the two routes enter the northwestern corner of Bar Harbor. Just before reaching Thompson Island in on the Trenton town line, the highway meets up with SR 3 once again. SR 102 and SR 198 both terminate at this intersection, with SR 3 continuing north (signed west) onto the Maine mainland.

== History ==
SR 102 was originally designated in 1925 and ran between Augusta and Belfast. It has also maintained most of its routing through Mount Desert, but most of the old route was later superseded by the designation of SR 3. SR 102 was overlapped with SR 3 in Trenton and Ellsworth until 1946, when it was truncated to run between Seal Cove and its current northern terminus at SR 3 in Bar Harbor.

In 1951, the southern portion of the route was extended, causing SR 102 to loop around the island clockwise along Tremont Road and Pretty Marsh Road and terminate at itself near Somes Pond, creating a lasso-shaped route in which one could be traveling due north on a road signed "south". SR 102 signage was removed from the western half of the loop in 2007, truncating SR 102 to the terminus of SR 102A in Tremont, leaving the rest of the loop unnumbered and referred to by the name Pretty Marsh Road. It was also removed from the official Acadia National Park map to match, though older Park signage at some intersections does still refer to Route 102 on this unsigned portion.

== Junction list ==
The entire route is in Hancock County.

Location	mi	km	Destinations	Notes
Tremont	0.00	0.00	SR 102A south (Harbor Drive) / Tremont Road – Bass Harbor, Tremont, West Tremont, Bernard, Seal Cove	Terminus of SR 102A
Southwest Harbor	1.66	2.67	SR 102A (Seawall Road) – Manset, Seawall	Terminus of SR 102A
Mount Desert	8.64	13.90	SR 3 / SR 198 south (Sound Drive) – Northeast Harbor, Bar Harbor	Southern terminus of SR 102/SR 198 concurrency; eastern terminus of SR 3
Bar Harbor	12.73– 12.86	20.49– 20.70	SR 3 (Bar Harbor Road) / SR 198 ends – Bar Harbor, Ellsworth	Northern terminus of SR 102/SR 198 concurrency
1.000 mi = 1.609 km; 1.000 km = 0.621 mi: Concurrency terminus

== Suffixed route ==
=== State Route 102A ===
State Route 102A
- Location: Tremont-Southwest Harbor
- Length: 6.79 mi (10.93 km)

SR 102A is a loop of SR 102 on the southeastern tip of Mount Desert Island. It connects to SR 102 in Tremont and Southwest Harbor, passing through the Manset and Seawall areas along the way and running for 6.8 miles (10.9 km).

It forms a nearly complete loop and, for the most part, lacks cardinal directions on guide signs. One exception is present in Tremont, where the first guide sign after departing from SR 102 indicates SR 102A south, although from this point the route also turns east, north, and west en route to Southwest Harbor.

Junction list

The entire route is in Hancock County.

Location	mi	km	Destinations	Notes
Tremont	0.00	0.00	SR 102 north (Bass Harbor Road) / Tremont Road – Southwest Harbor, Bernard	Southern terminus of SR 102
Southwest Harbor	6.79	10.93	SR 102 (Bass Harbor Road / Main Street) – Southwest Harbor, Ellsworth, Tremont, Bass Harbor, Seal Cove	
1.000 mi = 1.609 km; 1.000 km = 0.621 mi
