= Bar Harbor (disambiguation) =

Bar Harbor may refer to:

- Bar Harbor, Maine, a town in the United States
  - Bar Harbor (CDP), Maine, a census-designated place within the town of Bar Harbor
- Bar Harbor Airlines, a former commuter airline based in Bar Harbor, Maine

== See also ==
- Bal Harbour
