= Duncan Candler =

American architect (1873–1949)

- Born: Duncan Willson Candler; May 8, 1873; Brooklyn, New York, US
- Died: November 12, 1949 (aged 76); Salisbury, Connecticut, US
- Education: Columbia University; Academie des Beaux Arts
- Occupation: Architect
- Buildings: Skylands; The Eyrie; The Playhouse; Grace Dodge Hotel

Duncan Willson Candler (May 8, 1873 - November 12, 1949) was an American architect known for his various projects for Abby and John D. Rockefeller Jr. and the house Skylands for Edsel Ford. Martha Stewart says Candler is "a genius who deserves a book."

== Early life ==
Candler was a native of Brooklyn, New York. He was the son of Marcia Lillian Welch and Flamen Ball Candler, a lawyer with Winkle, Candler & Jay and president of the department of law at the Brooklyn Institute. As a youth, he played competitive tennis with the Brooklyn Heights Tennis Club, gaining a reputation as one of the best players in the region.

He attended Columbia University where he studied architecture, was a member of Delta Psi (St. Anthony Hall), and played tennis. He graduated from Columbia in 1895, then attended the Academie des Beaux Arts in Paris, France, taking his exams and graduating in 1897.

Around 1899, Candler and his parents moved to 50 5th Avenue in Manhattan. However, Candler remained in Europe, studying architecture and traveling until October 1900.

== Professional life ==
By 1902, Candler was a practicing architect with offices on 5th Avenue in New York City. He was elected to the New York Chapter of the American Institute of Architects in April 1911, and as a fellow to American Institute of Architects in September 1911. He retired in 1931.

== Works ==
=== Mount Desert Island cottages ===
Candler designed or modified many cottages on Mount Desert Island in Hancock County, Maine, including ten known projects in Seal Harbor (now known as Mount Desert). For these cottages, Candler used "natural materials, a broad terrace, [and] sympathetic siting." Some of these houses were designed for his brother-in-law, George L. Stebbins who was superintendent of the Cooksey Realty Co in Seal Harbor.

The first of these projects appears to be Ox Ledge which was built around 1900. Ox Ledge was a 6,805 square foot shingle style cottage with seventeen rooms. Martha Stewart purchased Ox Ledge in 2016 and received permits to demolish it in 2021.

Candler designed Wabenaki, constructed in 1906 and 1907 for Stebbins personal use. In 1909, he designed Eastpoint for Charlotte Augusta (née Rhodes) Hanna. He added a brick terrace to Keewaydin in 1910. He also expanded The Eyrie for John D. Rockefeller Jr. in 1915.

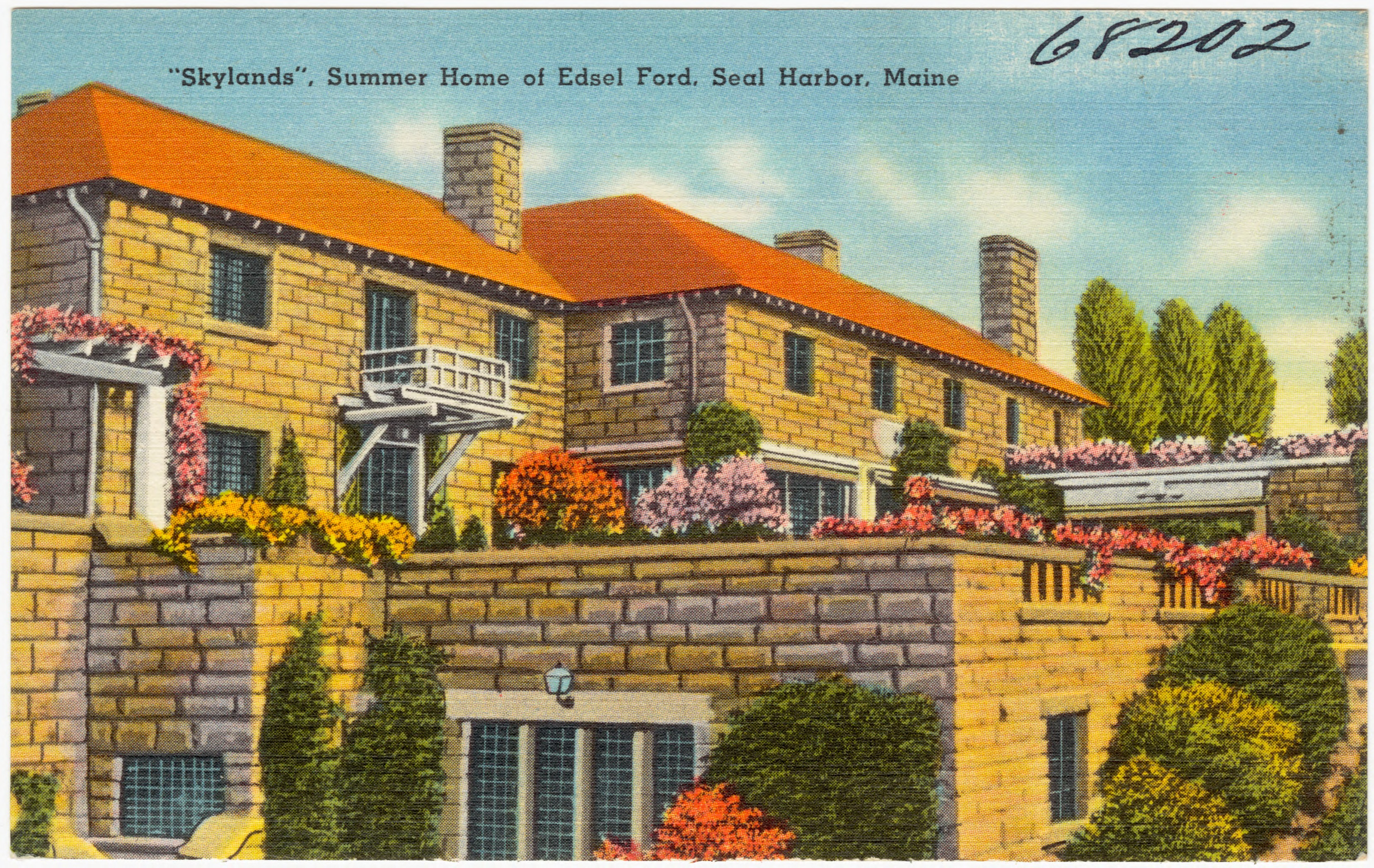
Skylands

Built between 1923 and 1925 as a summer home for Eleanor and Edsel Ford, Skylands is one of Candler's most significant projects. Candler and the Fords worked together to develop the style of Skylands and its location within the forty-acre tract. The result was a 35,000 square feet (3,300 m^{2}), twelve-bedroom house that is "severely geometric and horizontal." Skylands was built of pink granite harvested on-site and "seems to emerge from the surrounding granite outcrops. ...embraced by ledges and terraces instead of being plunked on a lawn." The 30 by 50 feet (9.1 by 15.2 m) living room has significant wood ceiling beams and a fireplace carved from the local pink granite. The house features eleven fireplaces and leaded windows with diamond panes. There is a pergola terrace off of the living room, as well as another terrace with water views. Candler also designed a carriage house, a guest house, a play house with a squash court, and a stable. In 1997, Martha Stewart purchased Skylands, fully furnished with Ford's belongings.

Candler's only known commission in Bar Harbor was to design substantial alterations to the 19th-century Green Court house which were completed in 1932. This house is part of the National Register of Historic Place's Harbor Land-Eden Street Historic District.

=== Continental Insurance Company ===
In 1905, Candler designed an office building on Montague Street in Brooklyn for the Continental Insurance Company. This "modern" four-story building was designed to be fireproof. The first floor was t25 by 100 feet (7.6 by 30.5 m), with the other floors being 25 by 50 feet (7.6 by 15.2 m) feet. The company's new offices were said to be "one of the best appointed in Greater New York."

=== Rockefeller projects ===
In 1912, John D. Rockefeller Jr. hired Candler to convert the Kinney House into offices and apartments. The Kinney House was located at 19 West 54th Street, across the street from Rockefeller's New York City home. In 1914, Rockefeller again called upon Candler for a similar project with a six-story home of Elizabeth Caudwell at 16 West 54th Street. Across the street from the Kinney House, the Caudwell home was converted into bachelor apartments with a doctor's office on the ground floor. Rockefeller commissioned both projects to keep tradespeople from operating near his house.

In 1913, Rockefeller hired Candler to add a sixth story to his home on 54th Street. In 1914, the Rockefeller commissioned Candler to oversee the enlargement of Abeyton Lodge, the family's primary residence in Pocantico. Next, Candler expanded The Eyrie at Seal Harbor for Rockefeller in 1915. He also added a playhouse and a shingle style boathouse with Colonial style details. The edition to The Eyrie more than doubled the original size of the cottage, taking it to 100 rooms. However, the half-timbered style of The Eyrie was to Rockefeller's taste, not Candler's. Eyrie was razed in 1962.

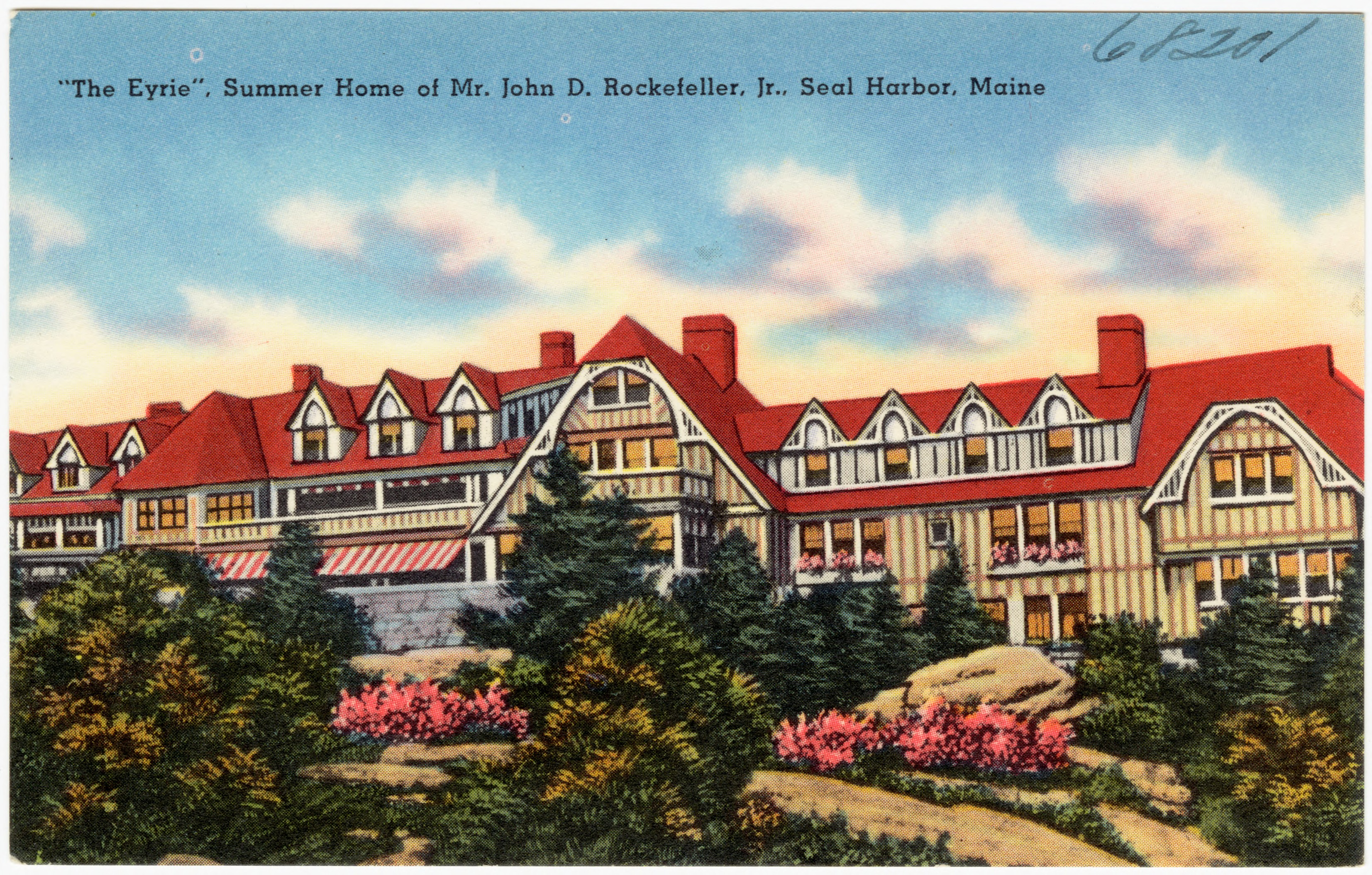
The Eyrie

In 1924, the Rockefellers commissioned Candler to design a "playhouse" for their six children, adjacent to Abeyton Lodge. The Tudor style, rambling two-story Playhouse was completed in 1927. The Playhouse had a reception hall, living rooms, dining rooms, music room, and a darkroom for developing and projecting films. One living room was paneled in oak and featured 16th-century French mantelpieces that Rockefeller had purchased in 1916. However, true to its name, the Playhouse was just that; it included a basketball court, a billiards room, two bowling lanes, a card room, a gymnasium, a volleyball court, and a heated swimming pool—all inside the building. The pool was large enough for water polo, with four lanes that were twenty-yards-long. Outside the Playhouse, was a baseball field, croquet greens, and tennis court. The Playhouse cost $500,000 (equivalent to $9,393,204 in 2023). David Rockefeller left Playhouse to the National Trust for Historic Preservation when he died in 2017. It is now part of the National Register's Rockefeller Pocantico Hills Estate Historic District. It is operated by the Rockefeller Brothers Fund as part of the Pocantico Center. The Rockefeller Brothers Fund renamed the Playhouse Abeyton Lodge after the home of the Fund's founders which is no longer standing.

In 1925, Abby Aldrich Rockefeller hired Candler to turn the children's seventh-floor playroom of the Rockefeller's 54th Street residence into "Topside Gallery" where she could showcase her collection of modern art. Topside Gallery and the Rockefeller's home on 54th Street was demolished in 1938, giving way to the Museum of Modern Art.

Candler also designed an art gallery for Mrs. Rockefeller on 54th Street in New York City. Called the Daylight Gallery, the brick building "was designed so that paintings and sculpture could be exhibited to the best advantage and to show, also, how works of art may be used as elements in a modern building." The Daylight Gallery included a skylight and glass ceiling. The Daylight Gallery was a freestanding building located behind the preexisting Downtown Gallery.

In 1929, Rockefeller asked Candler to design wooden gates for Duck Brook Carriage Road Bridge, which he was donating to Arcadia National Park.

=== YWCA ===
During World War I, Abby Aldrich Rockefeller chaired the housing committee for the national YWCA's War Works Council. A large number of American women were assisting in the war effort but found a housing shortage where they were needed to work. On behalf of the YWCA, Mrs. Rockefeller engaged Candler for two housing projects, one in Charleston, South Carolina, and the other in Washington, D.C. Candler donated his time to the effort.

The Charleston project was a "model house" for women who were making uniforms for the soldiers. Mrs. Rockefeller's idea was that Candler's design could be replicated by the United States government across the country, as needed. As a result, Candler created two variations—the two-story Type A building for 100 girls, and the three-story Type B building for 150 girls. However, Candler did not design the buildings as temporary wartime structures, but for prolonged use as a hotel or apartments after the war. In addition to single rooms for the women, the buildings included a living room, a dining room, a sun parlor, several sitting parlors, porches on each level, and recreational facilities for use as either a gymnasium or social gatherings. For safety, Candler's design included fire walls and fire escapes. In addition, he designed a separate Recreational Building that could be added to a complex of residential buildings. He noted that the Recreational Building should be central to the housing units, and constructed on land that was higher than the others. The sample house in Charleston had a blue slate roof, was finished in stucco with rose trim, and was shaped like a double E. The building was sited on five wooded acres. A newspaper noted that Candler's building was "a style of architecture which is distinctively American."

Also in 1918, Mrs. Rockefeller and Candler went to Washington D.C. to select another housing location for women in the war effort. However, the eight-story, 376-room hostel did not open until October 1921, too late to help with the war effort. Called the Grace Dodge Hotel, the YWCA facility was at North Capital and E Streets. It was "built and maintained for the use of women of leisure as well as the self-supporting woman, without restriction or rule." The hotel's white stone and tan-colored brick exterior was simple, with little ornamentation. Candler used cast stone and concrete, relatively inexpensive building materials, to create beauty within the building. Architecture magazine wrote, "There are reinforced concrete floor arches and cement floors throughout, except on the main floor, where lobby and dining-room are of terrazzo, laid in designs of different colors, and the lounge, where the floor is of oak. The main and garden entrances are filled with ornamental iron of Renaissance design." The hotel also included thoughtful conveniences for women such as shampoo sinks and suites for mothers. The Dodge Hotel was demolished in 1972.

=== Grosse Pointe ===
Candler designed a house at 486 Kercheval (now 30 Preston Place) in Grosse Pointe Farms, Michigan as the springtime home of Louise Webber Jackson. The house was built in 1932, but it is believed Candler designed it as much as ten years earlier. As the widow of Rosco Jackson, president of the Hudson Motor Car Company, Jackson spared no expense on her 8,900 square foot brick house.

== Personal ==
Candler married Beatrice de Trobriand Post on August 27, 1902, at Strandholme, the bride's summer home in Bayport, Long Island. This marriage allied "him with one of the most distinguished of the latter day Manhattan families." After their marriage, the couple lived at Strandholme. In November 1904, they moved to Short Hills, New Jersey, where Candler's brother was living with his wife. Their daughter, Edith Beatrice Candler, married Count Carlo de Beaf of Genoa on December 9, 1920, in their home at 753 5th Avenue. Beatrice Candler was the granddaughter of Countess de Trobriand.

During World War I, Candler was supportive of charitable efforts for the French artists and students of his alma mater, the Academie des Beaux Arts in Paris, France.

On March 30, 1934, Beatrice Candler arrived in Reno, Nevada to pursue a divorce. At the time, Candler was living at the University Club, while his wife was residing at 42 West 58th Street; the couple had lived in separate residences for seven years. Their divorce was awarded on May 15, 1934.

In August 1932, Candler, Edna Edell, and two others arrived in Bangor, Maine to vacation at the home of Z. L. Harvey. Candler married Mrs. Edna F. Edell of Canaan, Connecticut on June 5, 1937, in Salisbury, Connecticut.

He died at his home in Salisbury, Connecticut in 1949 at the age of 75. He was buried in Green-Wood Cemetery in Brooklyn, New York.
