= Eagle Lake Road Bridge =

Historic bridge in Acadia National Park, US

Eagle Lake Road Bridge Eagle Lake Bridge
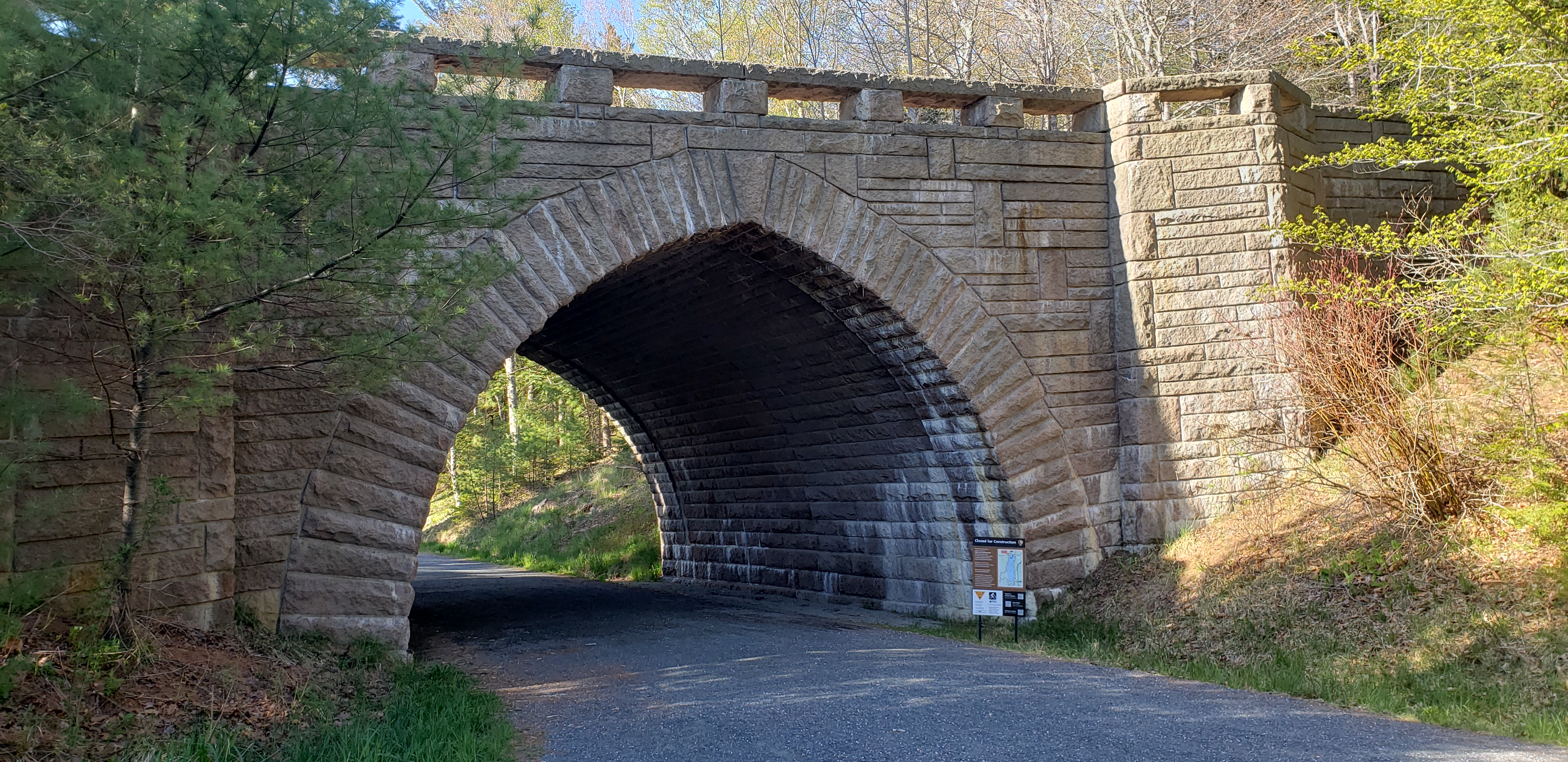
- Eagle Lake Road Bridge in Acadia National Park
- Coordinates: 44.37783°N 68.25326°W
- Carries: SR 233 (Eagle Lake Road)
- Crosses: Carriage road connector
- Locale: Acadia National Park, near Bar Harbor, Hancock County, Maine, United States

Characteristics
- Design: Stone-faced reinforced-concrete filled arch
- Material: Granite, reinforced concrete
- Total length: 116 ft
- Width: 34 ft (after widening)
- Height: 17 ft

History
- Architect: William Welles Bosworth
- Engineering design by: Paul D. Simpson
- Constructed by: B. W. Candage & Sons
- Opened: 1927

Location
- Interactive map of Eagle Lake Road Bridge

Eagle Lake Road Bridge (commonly known as the Eagle Lake Bridge) is an historic stone-faced reinforced-concrete filled arch bridge in Acadia National Park on Mount Desert Island, Maine. Built in 1927 as part of the Rockefeller carriage road system, the bridge carries State Route 233 (SR 233, Eagle Lake Road) over a carriage road connector linking the Eagle Lake and Witch Hole Pond loops. The bridge is noted for its Gothic (pointed) arch and for a 1974–1975 widening project that preserved its historic appearance while adapting it for modern traffic.

== Location ==
The bridge is located on Eagle Lake Road (SR 233) near carriage post 6 within Acadia National Park, spanning a connector carriage road between the Eagle Lake Loop and Witch Hole Pond Loop. It lies on the primary east–west route across Mount Desert Island and is visible from one of the park's most heavily used carriage road segments.

== History ==
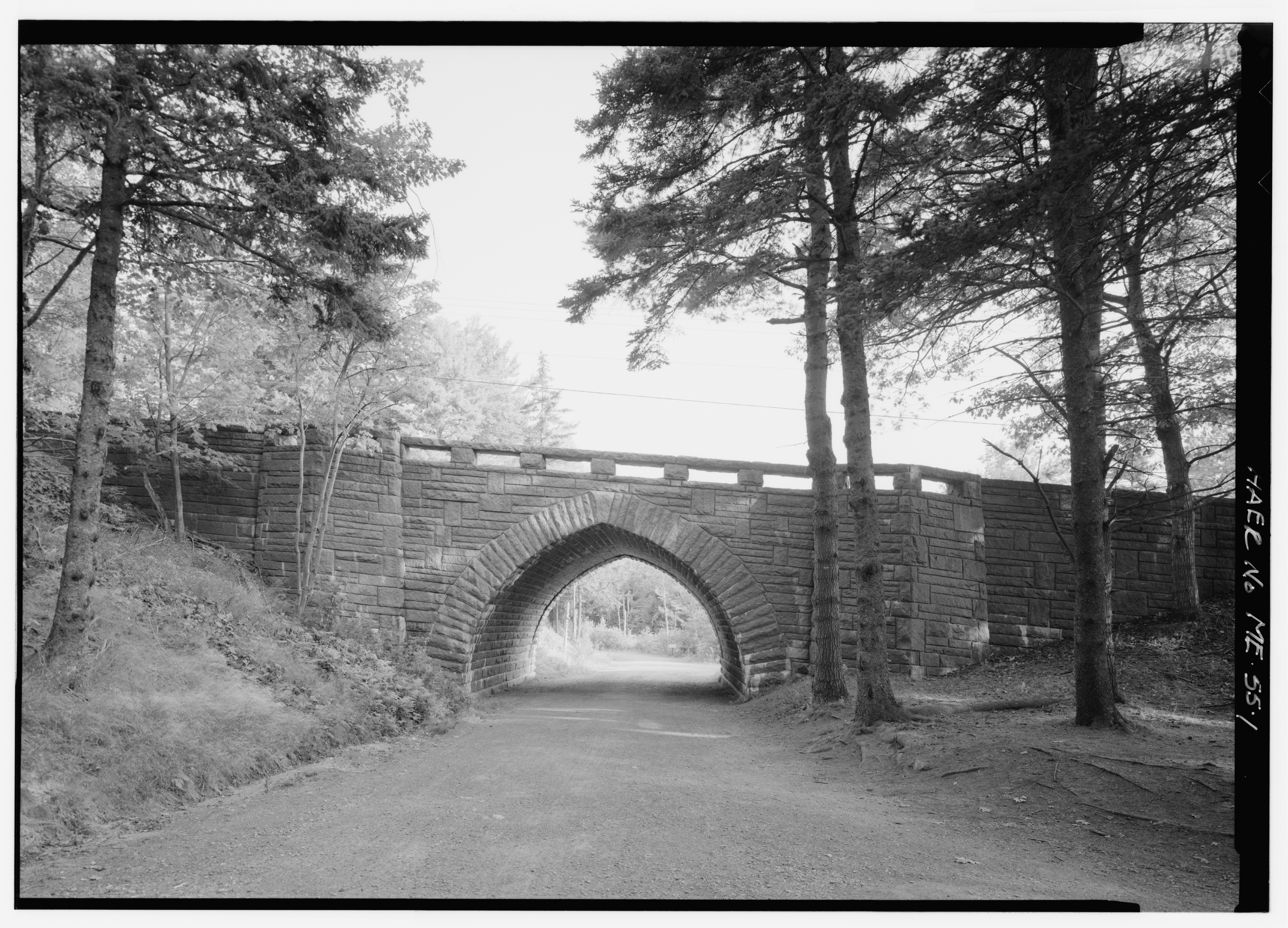
HAER photograph of the Eagle Lake Road Bridge, Acadia National Park, Maine

=== Construction ===
The Eagle Lake Road Bridge was constructed in 1927 as part of the carriage-road network financed by John D. Rockefeller Jr. between 1917 and 1940. The system comprises approximately 57 miles (92 km) of motor-free roads, bridges, and culverts designed for carriage travel while preserving scenic views and minimizing landscape disturbance.

Architect William Welles Bosworth designed the bridge with a pointed Gothic arch, parapet-wall openings, and projecting viewing platforms to reduce the visual mass of the stone structure and integrate it into the landscape. Construction was carried out by B. W. Candage & Sons of Seal Harbor, a firm responsible for many carriage-road bridges in Acadia.

=== Landscape setting ===
Following construction, landscape architect Beatrix Farrand proposed plantings at the approaches to frame the structure and improve views from both the roadway above and the carriage road below, consistent with the overall landscape design of the carriage road system.

=== Widening project (1974–1975) ===
By the early 1970s, increasing vehicle size and traffic on SR 233 made the original narrow roadway inadequate. The National Park Service and the Maine Department of Transportation approved a widening project that required preserving the bridge's historic appearance.

Rather than dismantling the structure, engineers and craftsmen separated the north granite sidewall and moved it outward as a single mass on steel tracks and ball bearings. A new reinforced-concrete backing wall and expanded arch were constructed behind the relocated stonework, increasing the deck width from approximately 22 to 34 feet (6.7 to 10.4 m) while maintaining traffic flow during construction.

The project received national recognition in 1975 for engineering innovation and historic preservation, including first place in Federal Highway Administration's Build America Award for outstanding treatment of a cultural or natural environment.

=== Later condition assessments ===
A 1990 bridge inspection found the structure to be in good overall condition, with moderate efflorescence and minor cracking typical of stone-faced concrete bridges of its age. Recommended work was limited to surface sealing and routine monitoring.

== Design and description ==
The bridge is a single-span stone-faced reinforced-concrete filled arch approximately 116 feet (35 m) long. Its pointed arch opening measures roughly 26 feet (7.9 m) wide and 17 feet (5.2 m) high and is framed by cut granite voussoirs. The spandrel and wing walls are built of coursed ashlar granite, and the parapet includes regularly spaced reveals to lighten the visual mass of the structure.

The Eagle Lake Road Bridge is one of only two Gothic-arched bridges documented in Acadia's carriage road system; the other is Hemlock Bridge on West Sargent Mountain Road.

== Significance ==
The bridge is significant as a well-preserved example of the stone-faced bridges built for Rockefeller's carriage roads and as a notable example of preservation-minded engineering. Its documentation by the Historic American Engineering Record and its award-winning widening project illustrate the successful integration of modern transportation needs within a protected national park landscape.
