= Old Dutch Foods =

Snack food manufacturer based in Roseville, Minnesota and Winnipeg, Manitoba

Coordinates: 45°0′53″N 93°12′2″W

Old Dutch Foods, Inc.
- Type: Private
- Industry: Snack food
- Founded: Saint Paul, Minnesota, United States (1934)
- Founder: Carl J. Marx
- Headquarters: Roseville, Minnesota
- Key people: Steven C. Aanenson; President
- Products: See products section
- Revenue: US $107 Million (2018)
- Number of employees: 500
- Subsidiaries: Humpty Dumpty Snack Foods
- Website: Old Dutch Foods

Old Dutch Foods, Inc. is a manufacturer of potato chips and other snack foods in the Midwestern United States, New England and Canada. Their product line includes brands such as Old Dutch Potato Chips, Dutch Crunch, Ripples, Cheese Pleesers and Restaurante Style Tortilla Chips.

== History ==
The company began as Old Dutch Products Co. founded by Carl J. Marx in 1934. Marx chose the name "Old Dutch" because the Dutch were associated with cleanliness and quality. They originated in St. Paul, Minnesota, but moved to Minneapolis in 1937. In 1968, they moved again, this time to Roseville, Minnesota, where they remain today.

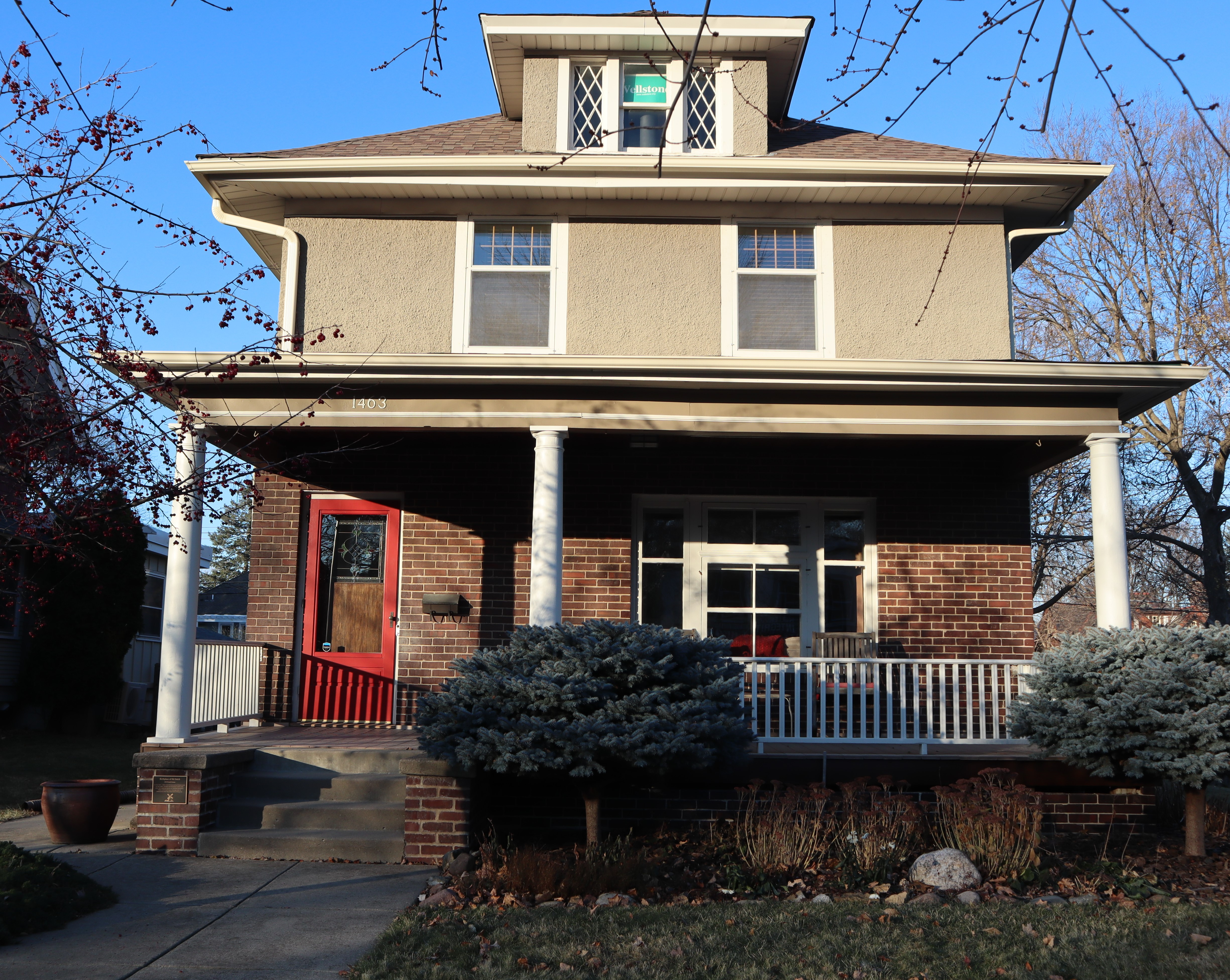
St. Paul house where Old Dutch originated

In 1954, Old Dutch opened a plant in Winnipeg, Manitoba, to manufacture chips for the Canadian market. The head office for Canadian operations remains in Winnipeg.

The company's American arm is officially called Old Dutch Foods, Inc., and their Canadian arm is Old Dutch Foods, Ltd. The company celebrated its 70th anniversary in 2004 with a line of television commercials. Old Dutch Foods acquired Humpty Dumpty Snack Foods in a C$26.7 million takeover bid in 2006. The Humpty Dumpty brand is generally sold in the New England states, Ontario, Quebec, the Maritimes, and Newfoundland and Labrador.

== Products ==
The Old Dutch brand is mainly known for the many flavors of potato chips they produce. They come in bags, "twin packs" (cardboard boxes with two packages of chips inside) and "triple packs" (with three packages inside).

Potato chip flavors available in the United States include the flagship Regular flavor, as well as Sour Cream & Onion, Cheddar & Sour Cream, Dill Pickle, Bar•B•Q, and Onion & Garlic as well as Smokey Bacon. In addition, Ripples Chips are available in Original, French, Mesquite Bar•B•Q, and Loaded Spud varieties. On February 4, 2008, Mexican Chili and Au Gratin were reintroduced back to Canada. Other products include Dutch Crunch kettle-cooked chips, cheese puffs, Puffcorn (puffed corn twists - called Popcorn Twists in Canada), Restaurante Style tortilla chips, Arriba flavoured tortillas, pretzels, dips and salsas, Dutch Gourmet thick cut flavoured ripple chips, Ridgies flavoured ripple chips, baked chips, sunflower seeds, pork rinds, and beef jerky.

Many of the same products are available in Canada and the United States, although somewhat altered, such as their vibrant yellow herb free Onion & Garlic chip. There are three exceptions: Ketchup, All Dressed and Salt & Vinegar flavours may not be available outside Canada. (These flavors are sold in New England under the Humpty Dumpty brand.)

In 2005, the firm introduced Old Dutch beef jerky.

== Manufacturing locations ==
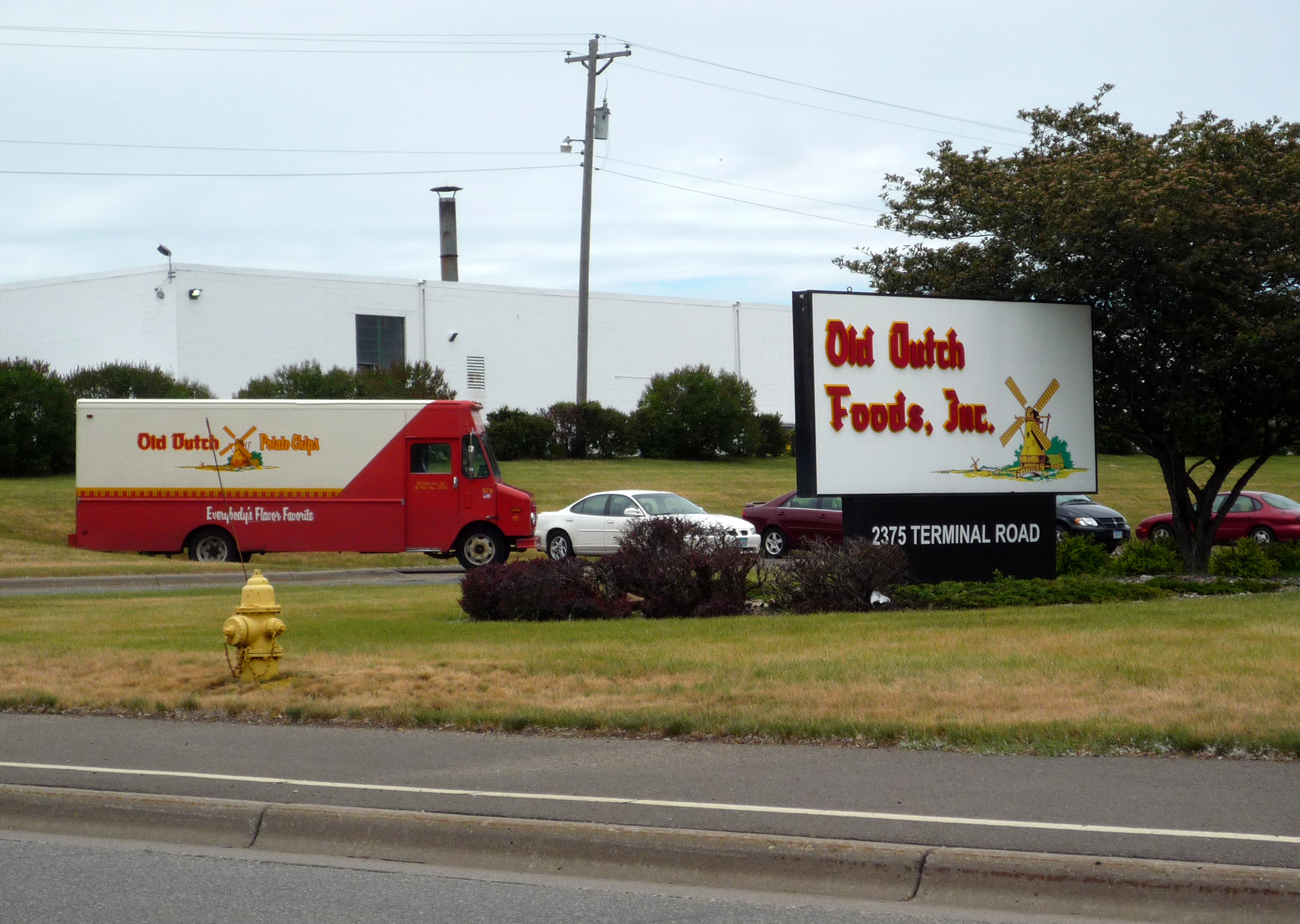
Outside Old Dutch headquarters in Roseville

Canada

- Winnipeg, Manitoba - Canadian Head office, potato chip facility
- Calgary, Alberta - Potato chip facility
- Airdrie, Alberta - Corn chip and extruded product facility
- Lachine, Quebec - Humpty Dumpty Potato Chip and extruded product facility (closed 2013)
- Hartland, New Brunswick - Old Dutch potato chip and extruded product facility
- Dartmouth, Nova Scotia - Old Dutch Foods potato facility
- Mississauga, Ontario - Old Dutch Foods potato facility

There are also 11 distribution centres across Western Canada.

US

- Roseville, Minnesota - Headquarters and potato chip facility
- Minneapolis, Minnesota - Corn product facility
