= The Eyrie Summer Home =

House in Seal Harbor, Maine, U.S.

Coordinates: 44.2962°N 68.2516°W

The Eyrie Summer Home was the summer residence located in Seal Harbor, Maine of the Rockefeller family. It was purchased by John D. Rockefeller Jr. in 1910. Rockefeller hired architect Duncan Candler to oversee the original cottage's expansion in 1914. However, ca.1962 The Eyrie was torn down. [2] The current location is home to the Abby Aldrich Rockefeller Garden.

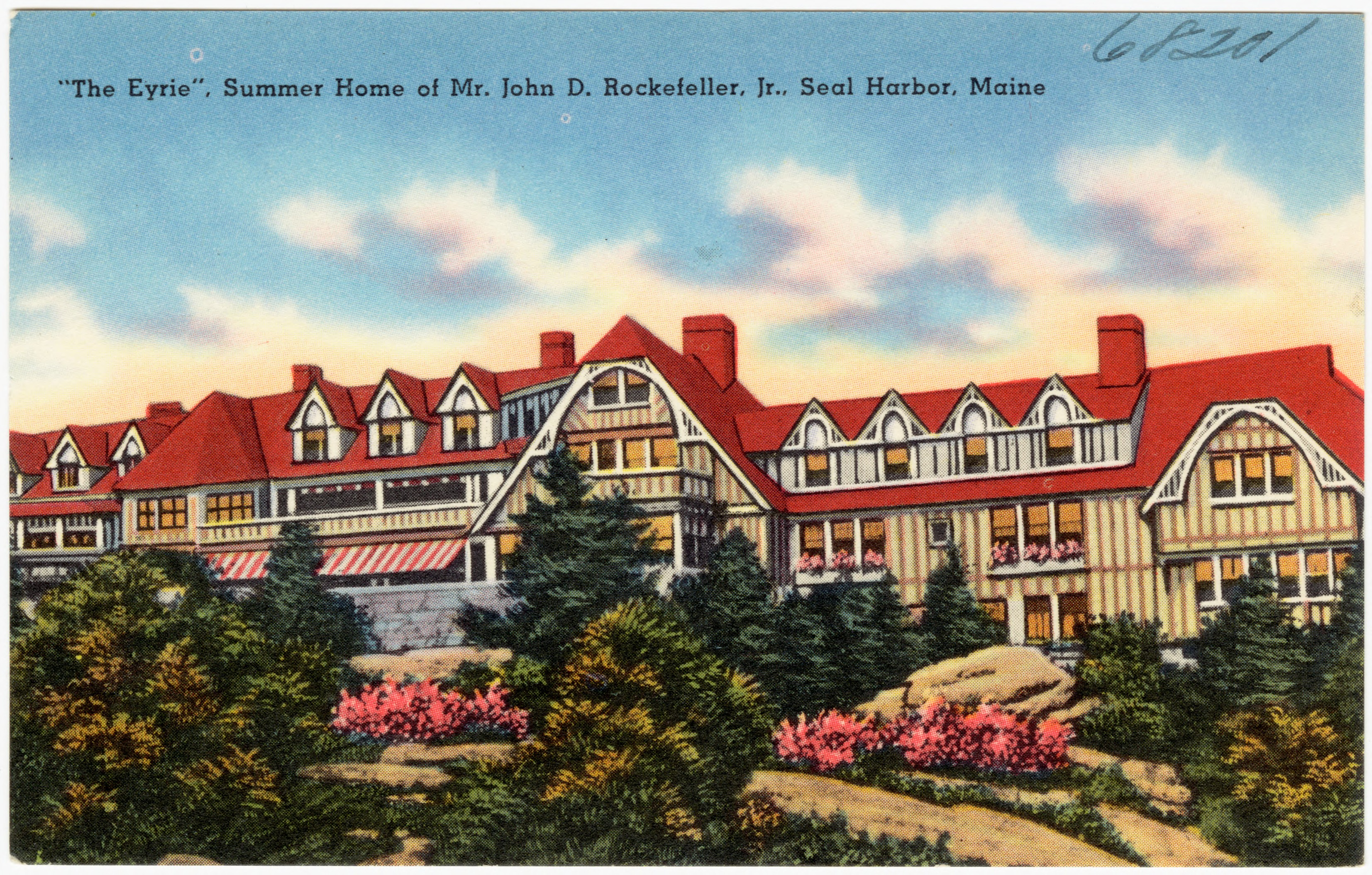
The Eyrie, Summer Home of Mr. John D. Rockefeller Jr., Seal Harbor, Maine (68201)

== See also ==
- Acadia National Park
