= Maine State Route 232 =

State highway in Oxford County, Maine, US

State Route 232

Route information
- Maintained by MaineDOT
- Length: 9.41 mi (15.14 km)
- Existed: 1955–present

Major junctions
- South end: SR 26 in Woodstock
- North end: US 2 near Rumford

Location
- Country: United States
- State: Maine
- Counties: Oxford

Highway system
- Maine State Highway System; Interstate; US; State; Auto trails; Lettered highways
← SR 231	→ SR 233

State Route 232 (abbreviated SR 232) is a 9.41-mile-long (15.14 km) state highway located in Oxford County in western Maine. It begins at SR 26 in Woodstock and ends at U.S. Route 2 (US 2) in Rumford. The highway functions as an eastern bypass of SR 26 and US 2 in Bethel, providing a more direct north-south connection to and from points east.

== Route description ==
SR 232 begins in Woodstock at SR 26 just east of Bryant Pond. It proceeds north, passing through the southeastern corner of Bethel and northwestern corner of Milton before entering the town of Rumford. SR 232 turns northwest and runs along the southern side of the Androscoggin River for about 2.1 miles (3.4 km), then turns east, crosses the river, and terminates at US 2.

== History ==
Most of SR 232, from its southern terminus to its intersection with South Rumford Road in Rumford near the Androscoggin River, was formerly part of SR 120 as it was designated in 1925. When that highway was truncated to US 2 in downtown Rumford in 1955, South Rumford Road was left unnumbered and the remaining stretch south to SR 26 was renumbered to SR 232.

The original Martin Memorial Bridge over the Androscoggin River was built in the mid-to-late 1950s as a 600-foot-long (180 m), 24-foot-wide (7.3 m) steel truss bridge. In 2011, the Federal Highway Administration declared the bridge structurally deficient. Its replacement was funded through a Transportation Investment Generating Economic Recovery (TIGER) Grant by the federal government and was to be relocated about 600 feet (180 m) north of the existing site to take advantage of a narrower river width and improved sight distances along US 2 for a new intersection. The new bridge opened on June 30, 2015.

== Junction list ==
The entire route is in Oxford County.

Location	mi	km	Destinations	Notes
Woodstock	0.00	0.00	SR 26 (South Main Street) – West Paris, Woodstock	
Rumford	9.32– 9.38	15.00– 15.10	Martin Memorial Bridge over the Androscoggin River	
Rumford	9.41	15.14	US 2 – Bethel, Rumford	
1.000 mi = 1.609 km; 1.000 km = 0.621 mi
