= Southwest Harbor (CDP), Maine =

Southwest Harbor, Maine
- Census-designated place
- Location within Maine Location within the United States
- Coordinates: 44°16′42″N 68°19′43″W
- Country: United States
- State: Maine
- County: Hancock
- Town: Southwest Harbor

Area
  - Total: 1.35 sq mi (3.49 km^{2})
  - Land: 1.35 sq mi (3.49 km^{2})
  - Water: 0 sq mi (0.00 km^{2})
- Elevation: 95 ft (29 m)

Population (2020)
  - Total: 740
  - Density: 549.5/sq mi (212.16/km^{2})
- Time zone: UTC-5 (Eastern (EST))
  - Summer (DST): UTC-4 (EDT)
- ZIP code: 04679
- Area code: 207
- FIPS code: 23-72830
- GNIS feature ID: 2630701

Southwest Harbor is a census-designated place (CDP) in the town of Southwest Harbor in Hancock County, Maine, United States. The CDP population was 720 at the 2010 census, out of 1,764 people in the town as a whole.

== Geography ==
The Southwest Harbor CDP is the main village within the town of Southwest Harbor on Mount Desert Island. It is situated primarily around the tidal cove of Southwest Harbor and extends north to Norwood Cove. Both inlets are located at the southern end of Somes Sound, an arm of the Gulf of Maine.

Maine State Route 102 passes through Southwest Harbor, leading southwest 2.5 miles (4.0 km) to Tremont and north 6 miles (10 km) to Somesville at the north end of Somes Sound. Route 102A splits east from Route 102 at the southern end of the Southwest Harbor CDP, and makes a loop through Seawall and Bass Harbor, reaching Tremont in 7 miles (11 km).

According to the United States Census Bureau, the Southwest Harbor CDP has an area of 1.4 square miles (3.5 km^{2}), all land.

== Demographics ==
Historical population
Census	Pop.	Note	%±
2020	740		—
U.S. Decennial Census
