= Seawall Campground =

- U.S. National Register of Historic Places
- U.S. Historic district
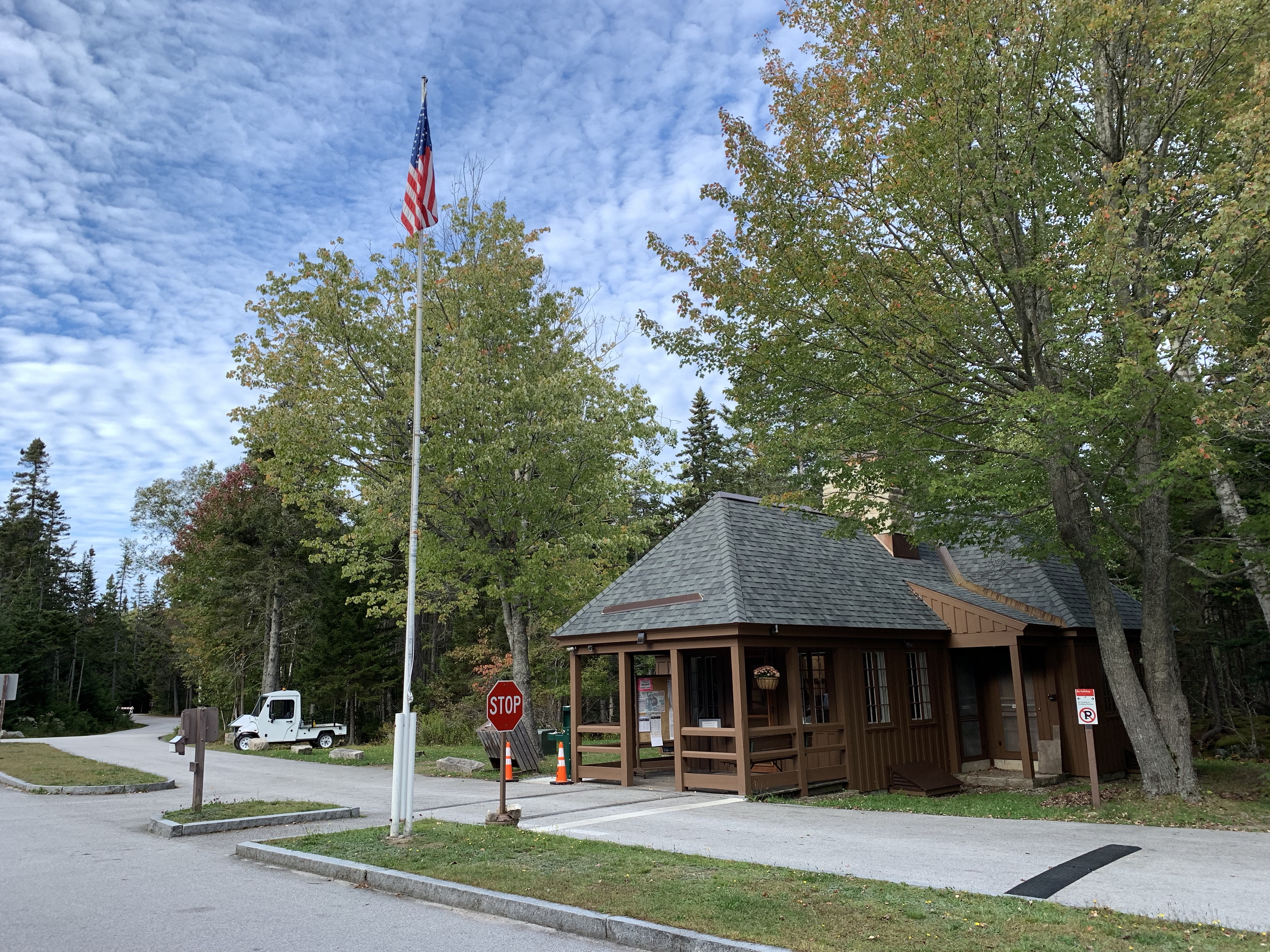
- Checking Station (1941)

- Location within Maine Location within the United States
- Nearest city: Southwest Harbor, Maine
- Coordinates: 44°14′26″N 68°18′16″W
- Area: 120 acres (49 ha)
- Built: 1935
- Built by: Civilian Conservation Corps; et.al.
- Architectural style: Historic Campground
- MPS: Acadia National Park MPS
- NRHP reference No.: 07000613
- Added to NRHP: June 29, 2007

Seawall Campground is a campground in Acadia National Park on Mount Desert Island off the coast of Maine. The campground offers four loops of campsites, including "drive-up" sites suitable for RVs and trailers, as well as walk-in tent-only campsites, and is open from late May into October. Much of the campground was built between 1936 and 1942 by crews of the Civilian Conservation Corps; this section is listed on the National Register of Historic Places. The campground is located in the village of Seawall, in the town of Southwest Harbor on Maine State Route 102A.

== Description and history ==
The Seawall Campground is located on 120 acres (49 ha) of parkland near the southern end of the western lobe of Mount Desert Island, in a portion of Acadia National Park that is separated from the largest portion, which is on the island's eastern lobe. It is on the north side of Route 102A, the main loop road around the coast of that part of the island. The entrance road leads north to the checkin station, north of which four loops of campsites branch. Other public facilities include comfort stations with toilets and hot showers, and an amphitheater, while service facilities including park staff housing and other utility buildings.

Acadia National Park was established in 1916 as a National Monument and was designated a national park in 1919, the first in the United States park system located east of the Mississippi River. The first master plan for the park, published in 1927, included a call for campgrounds, but funding did not become available until the jobs programs of the 1930s. In 1935 the site of Seawall Campground was chosen, and construction began in 1936 by Civilian Conservation Corps crews funded by the Works Progress Administration. Loops A and B were the first to be built, using the park service's principles of Rustic design. They were completed by the end of season in 1937, except for the comfort station in Loop B, which was built in a subsequent season. Work continued on Loop C and the checkin/ranger station, but progress on these was delayed by US entry into World War II, and they were not finished until 1942. Loop D, which consists of walk-in tent campsites, and the amphitheater were built in the 1950s as part of a "Mission 66" program by the park service to expand facilities ahead of its fiftieth anniversary in 1966.

== See also ==
- National Register of Historic Places listings in Hancock County, Maine
- National Register of Historic Places listings in Acadia National Park
