= Maine State Route 231 =

State highway in Cumberland County, Maine, US

State Route 231

Route information
- Maintained by MaineDOT
- Length: 11.51 mi (18.52 km)
- Existed: 1954–present

Major junctions
- South end: SR 115 in North Yarmouth
- North end: US 202 / SR 4 / SR 100 in New Gloucester

Location
- Country: United States
- State: Maine
- Counties: Cumberland

Highway system
- Maine State Highway System; Interstate; US; State; Auto trails; Lettered highways
← SR 230	→ SR 232

State Route 231 (SR 231) is a 11.51-mile-long (18.52 km) state highway located in Cumberland County in southeastern Maine. It begins at State Route 115 in North Yarmouth and runs north to New Gloucester, where it ends at U.S. Route 202, State Route 4 and State Route 100. The highway functions as an eastern bypass of Gray.

== Route description ==
SR 231 begins at SR 115 in North Yarmouth, where SR 115 turns northwest on Gray Road towards downtown Gray. SR 231 proceeds north thRough the town center and crosses the Royal River. The highway nicks the eastern corner of Gray and crosses into the town of New Gloucester, where it continues north through the town center and terminates at Lewiston Road, which carries US 202 / SR 4 / SR 100.

SR 231 is called New Gloucester Road in North Yarmouth and Intervale Road in New Gloucester.

== Major junctions ==
The entire route is in Cumberland County.

Location	mi	km	Destinations	Notes
North Yarmouth	0.00	0.00	SR 115 (Gray Road / Walnut Hill Road) – North Yarmouth, Yarmouth, Gray	Southern terminus
New Gloucester	11.51	18.52	US 202 / SR 4 / SR 100 (Lewiston Road) / Bald Hill Road – Gray, Auburn	Northern terminus
1.000 mi = 1.609 km; 1.000 km = 0.621 mi
