= Humpty Dumpty Snack Foods =

American food company

- Type: Subsidiary
- Founded: 1947; 79 years ago Scarborough, Maine, U.S.
- Founders: George Robinson; Norman Cole
- Headquarters: Winnipeg, Manitoba, Canada
- Parent: Borden (1989–2000); Small Fry (2000–2006); Old Dutch Foods (2006–present)
- Website: humptydumpty.com

Humpty Dumpty Snack Foods is an American food company, operating as a subsidiary of Old Dutch Foods, that packages and sells snack foods. The company is named after the nursery rhyme character and features the character as the company logo. Humpty Dumpty products are generally sold in New England, Quebec and Atlantic Canada.

== History ==
Humpty Dumpty Potato Chip Company, Inc., was founded in 1947 in Scarborough, Maine, United States. Founded by George Robinson and Norman Cole, the Humpty Dumpty Potato Chip Company produced potato chips in many flavors, including ketchup, and "sour cream and clam".

The Humpty Dumpty Potato Chip Company was acquired by Borden, Inc. in February, 1989.

In January 2000, the Humpty Dumpty Potato Chip Company was sold by Borden to the Canadian firm Small Fry, Inc., and it became known as Humpty Dumpty Snack Foods, Inc.

In 2006, the company was acquired in a takeover bid by Old Dutch Foods, a Minnesota-based snack food company. After the acquisition, Humpty Dumpty potato chip products were rebranded as Old Dutch potato chips. Old Dutch Foods retained the Humpty Dumpty name, and still sells their chips and snacks in the USA. In Canada, Humpty Dumpty's potato chip line was rebranded "Old Dutch", an already well-established brand of potato chip in many parts of Canada; they kept the "Humpty Dumpty" name for its other snacks.

The company closed their Quebec-based Montreal Humpty Dumpty manufacturing plant, which had been continuously operating since 1964, on September 27, 2013. The remaining four other Canadian plants, in other provinces, were unaffected.
