= Bar Harbor (CDP), Maine =

Bar Harbor, Maine
- Census-designated place
- Location within Maine Location within the United States
- Coordinates: 44°23′09″N 68°12′40″W
- Country: United States
- State: Maine
- County: Hancock
- Town: Bar Harbor

Area
  - Total: 3.17 sq mi (8.22 km^{2})
  - Land: 3.17 sq mi (8.22 km^{2})
  - Water: 0 sq mi (0.00 km^{2})
- Elevation: 131 ft (40 m)

Population (2020)
  - Total: 2,260
  - Density: 711.8/sq mi (274.81/km^{2})
- Time zone: UTC-5 (Eastern (EST))
  - Summer (DST): UTC-4 (EDT)
- ZIP code: 04609
- Area code: 207
- FIPS code: 23-02830
- GNIS feature ID: 2377888

Bar Harbor is a census-designated place (CDP) in the town of Bar Harbor in Hancock County, Maine, United States. The CDP population was 2,552 at the 2010 census, out of a population of 5,235 in the town of Bar Harbor as a whole.

== Geography ==
The Bar Harbor CDP consists of the main urban center of the town of Bar Harbor. The CDP is located on Mount Desert Island in the eastern part of the town. The CDP is bordered to the northeast by Frenchman Bay, including the actual Bar Harbor cove, to the west by Paradise Hill Road and to the south by Park Loop Road and Bear Brook. The western and southern margins of the CDP are within Acadia National Park. The CDP extends northwest along Route 3 and the Frenchman Bay shoreline as far as Hulls Cove.

Maine State Route 3 is the primary road through the community, leading northwest 11 miles (18 km) to the bridge to the mainland at Mount Desert Narrows and 20 miles (32 km) to Ellsworth. Route 3 leads south from Bar Harbor 12 miles (19 km) through Acadia National Park to Northeast Harbor. Maine State Route 233 leads west from Bar Harbor 8 miles (13 km) to Somesville.

According to the United States Census Bureau, the CDP has a total area of 3.2 square miles (8.2 km^{2}), all land.

== Demographics ==
Historical population
Census	Pop.	Note	%±
2020	2,260		—
U.S. Decennial Census

As of the census of 2000, there were 2,680 people, 1,241 households, and 568 families residing in the CDP. The population density was 851.1 inhabitants per square mile (328.6/km^{2}). There were 1,558 housing units at an average density of 494.8 per square mile (191.0/km^{2}). The racial makeup of the CDP was 97.35% White, 0.26% Black or African American, 0.22% Native American, 1.01% Asian, 0.15% from other races, and 1.01% from two or more races. Hispanic or Latino of any race were 0.71% of the population.

There were 1,241 households, out of which 19.7% had children under the age of 18 living with them, 36.3% were married couples living together, 6.4% had a female householder with no husband present, and 54.2% were non-families. 41.7% of all households were made up of individuals, and 17.9% had someone living alone who was 65 years of age or older. The average household size was 2.01 and the average family size was 2.71.

In the CDP, the population was spread out, with 16.8% under the age of 18, 12.9% from 18 to 24, 27.1% from 25 to 44, 24.2% from 45 to 64, and 19.0% who were 65 years of age or older. The median age was 40 years. For every 100 females, there were 77.1 males. For every 100 females age 18 and over, there were 74.0 males.

The median income for a household in the CDP was $33,609, and the median income for a family was $50,729. Males had a median income of $30,688 versus $24,844 for females. The per capita income for the CDP was $23,730. About 4.4% of families and 10.3% of the population were below the poverty line, including 6.1% of those under age 18 and 7.5% of those age 65 or over.

== Education ==
It is in the Bar Harbor School District, an elementary school district, and the Mount Desert Community School District (for secondary school).

College of the Atlantic is in the CDP.
