= Somesville, Maine =

- Somesville Historic District
- U.S. National Register of Historic Places
- U.S. Historic district
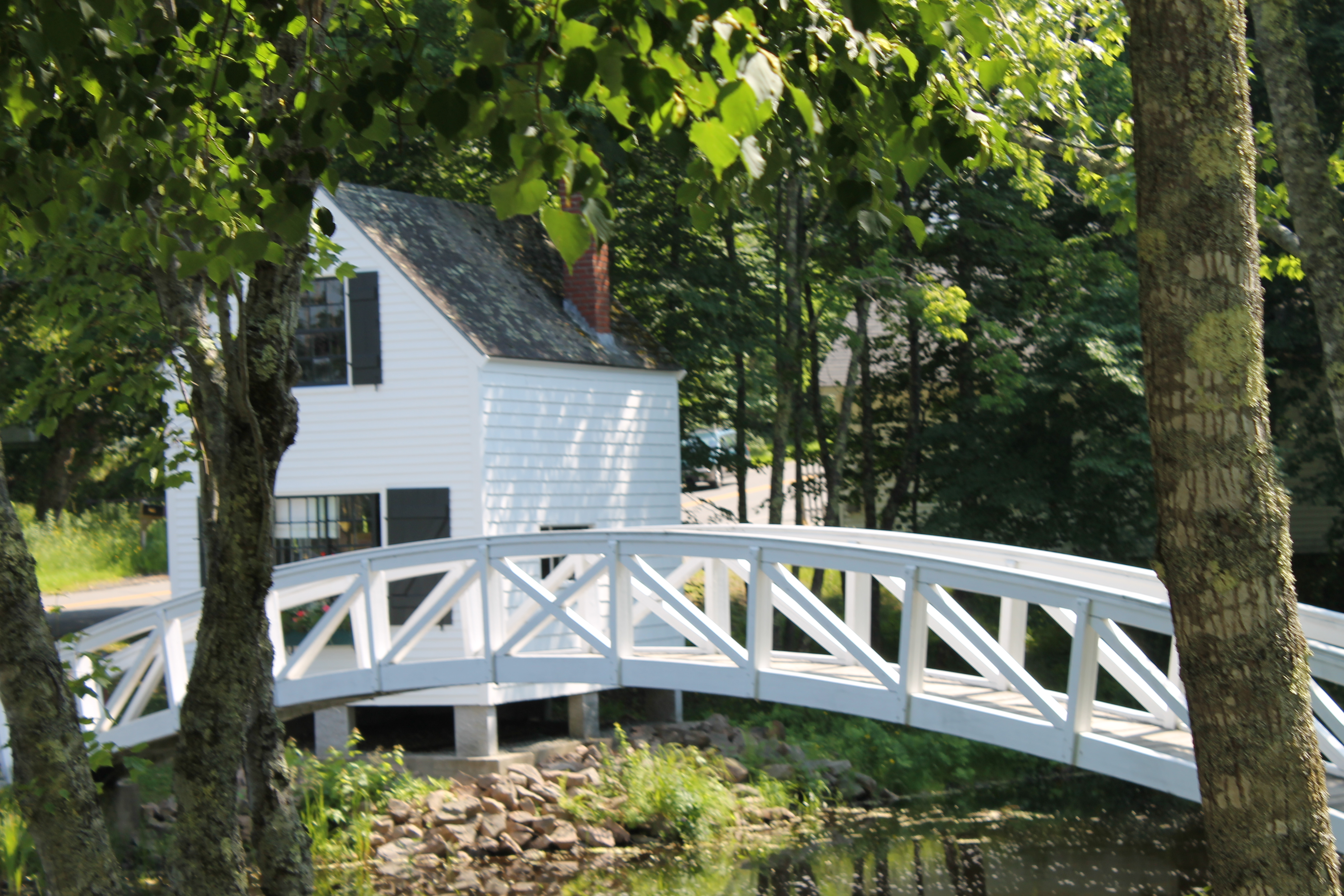

- Location within Maine Location within the United States
- Location: Somes Harbor and its environs, Mount Desert, Maine
- Area: 400 acres (160 ha)
- Architect: Deane, Benjamin S.; Noyes, John M.
- Architectural style: Greek Revival, Federal
- NRHP reference No.: 75000092
- Added to NRHP: January 8, 1975

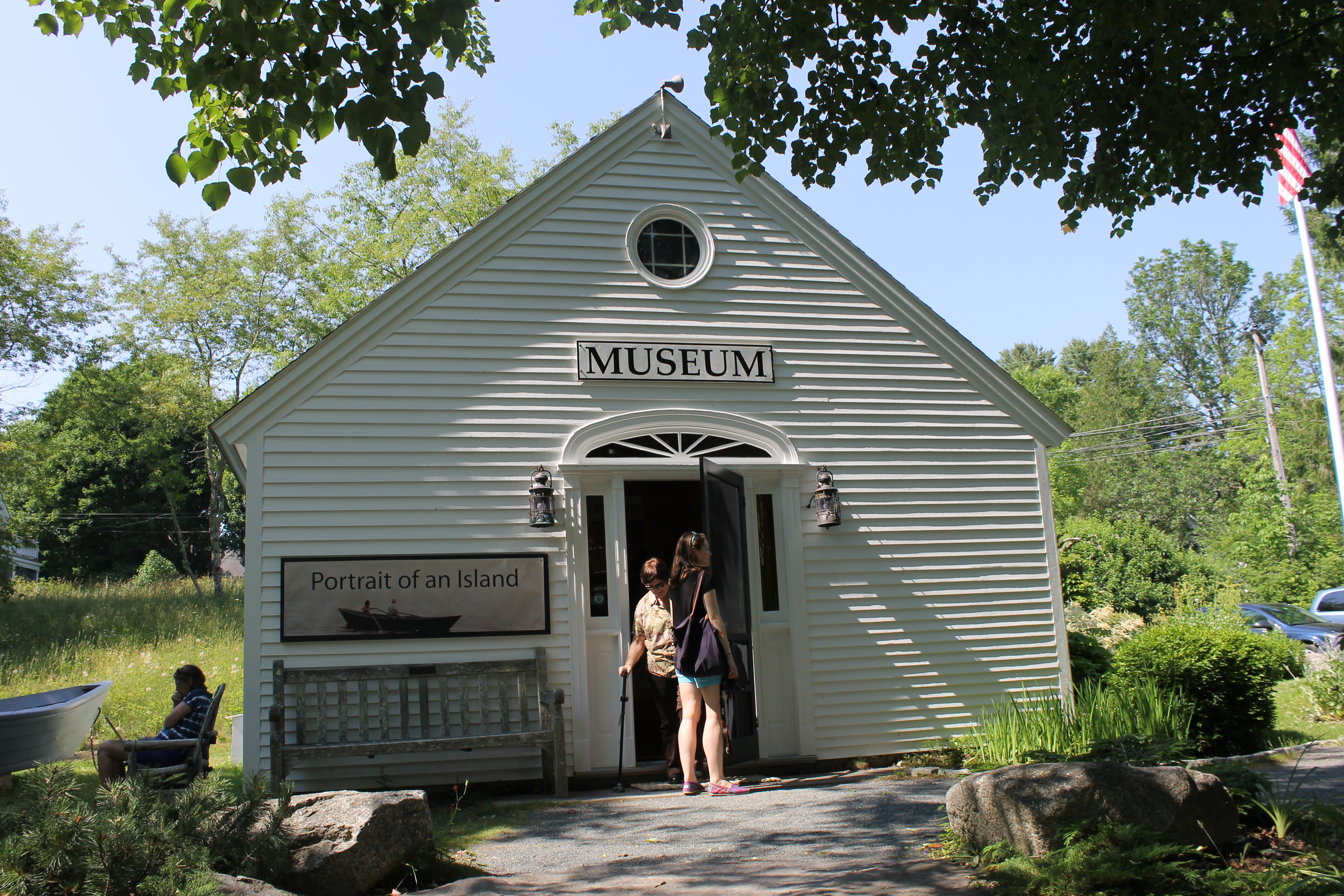
Somesville Museum in Somesville

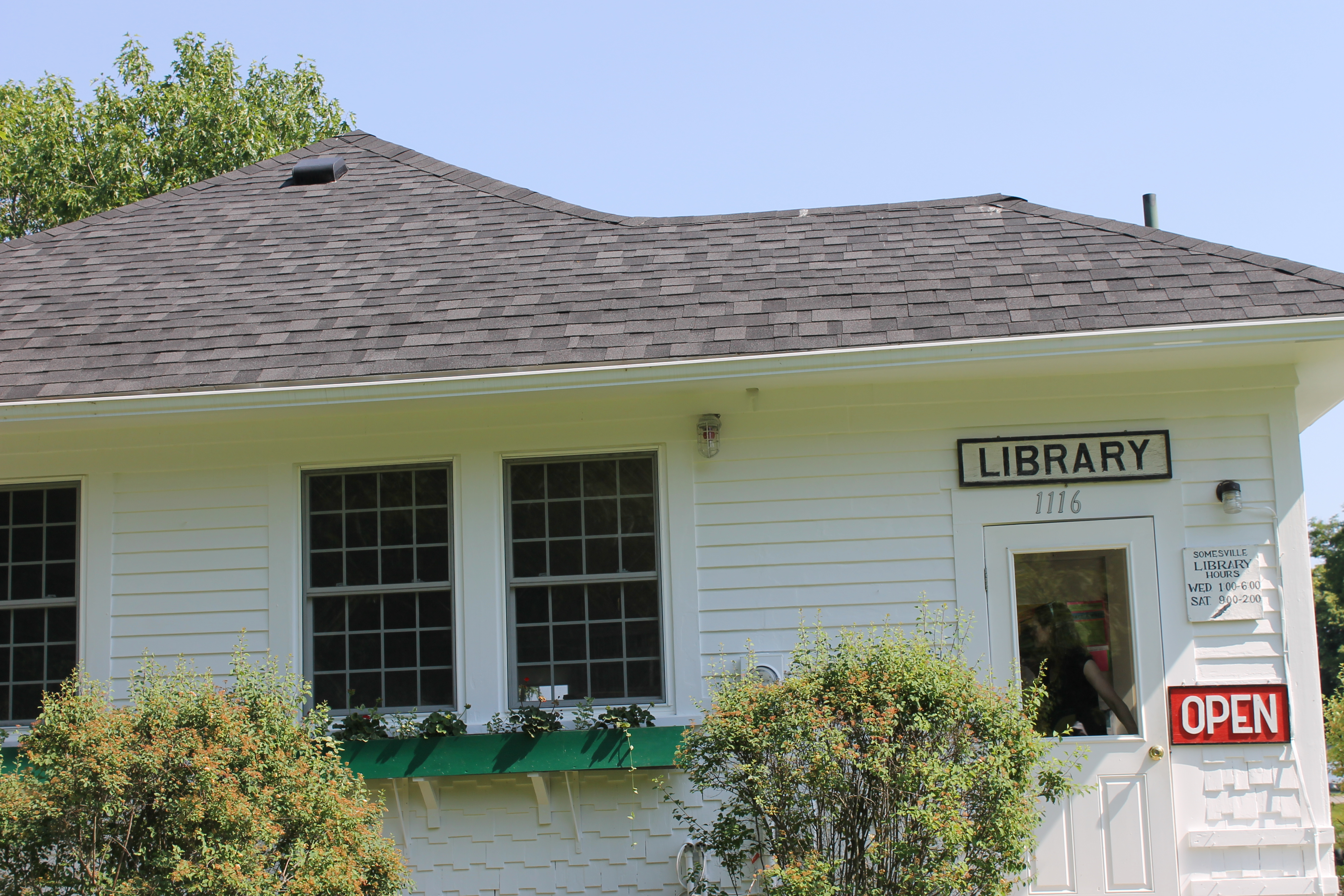
Across from the museum is the Somesville Library, a private facility with limited hours.

Somesville is the oldest village of the town of Mount Desert on Mount Desert Island in southeastern Maine, United States. It is located on the north end of Somes Sound. The village was established by Abraham Somes who was the first European settler on the island. It attracted many people because of its mills and quarries. The entire village is part of the Somesville Historic District.

== History ==
The history of Somesville dates back to Native Americans. The first Native Americans to visit the island were not permanent residents but they visited the island as far back as 4000 B.C. After the Native Americans, the first families that settled on the island were Abraham and Hannah Somes as well as James and Rachel Richardson in the year of 1761. Somes was requested by the Massachusetts governor, Francis Bernard, to settle there and establish mills. They named their village Somesville and the inlet it was on, Somes Sound, after Abraham and his family. Somesville's history still attracts many new inhabitants today.

== Industry ==
An important aspect of Somesville is its industry. After enough settlers traveled to the island the industry became prosperous. One could find a job in logging, fishing, shipbuilding, coastal trading, or quarry working. The island contained many job opportunities with several logging mills, a shoe factory, and a woolen mill. These industries made the Somes family the wealthiest on the island by 1840 along with the Whiting family, who also owned many warehouses and businesses. The lumber, grist, and wool mills of Somesville were supported by multiple dams. The granite quarries were also a very large part of the industry. In 1886 the annual shipment of cut stone was estimated to be over 3,500 tons. The booming industry quickly attracted settlers, and by 1950 the population had tripled.

== Geology ==
The Mount Desert Island we see today was largely formed around 380 million years ago by the collision of the continent and an arc of islands, which created the granites and other igneous rocks that comprise most of the island and its mountains. This is how the mountainous landscape came into being. As recently as one million years ago, a mile-thick glacier moved a few yards each year and eventually reached the Mount Desert Range. During this glacial event, Somes Sound was carved out of the island, giving it a curved U-shaped valley characteristic of glaciation. Today, many types of rock are on the island, including granites and volcanic rocks which resulted from the collision. These granites and volcanic rocks were emplaced adjacent to ~400 million year old siltstones and sandstones that sit on the inland side of the island on which the village of Bar Harbor lies. The mountains of Acadia represent a collisional tectonic event which was soon followed by a related series of continental collisions which led to a major phase in the mountain-building of the Northern Appalachians known as the Acadian Orogeny.

== Historic district ==
In 1975, the central village of Somesville and the harbor area were listed as a historic district on the National Register of Historic Places. The district extends along Main Street from Denning Brook to Maine State Route 3, and encompasses the entire shoreline of the harbor as far south as Mason and Squantum Points. It includes the 1828 Isaac Somes House, the oldest in the village, and the 1852 Union Church.

== See also ==
- National Register of Historic Places listings in Hancock County, Maine
