= Mount Desert, Maine =

Town in Maine, United States

- Town
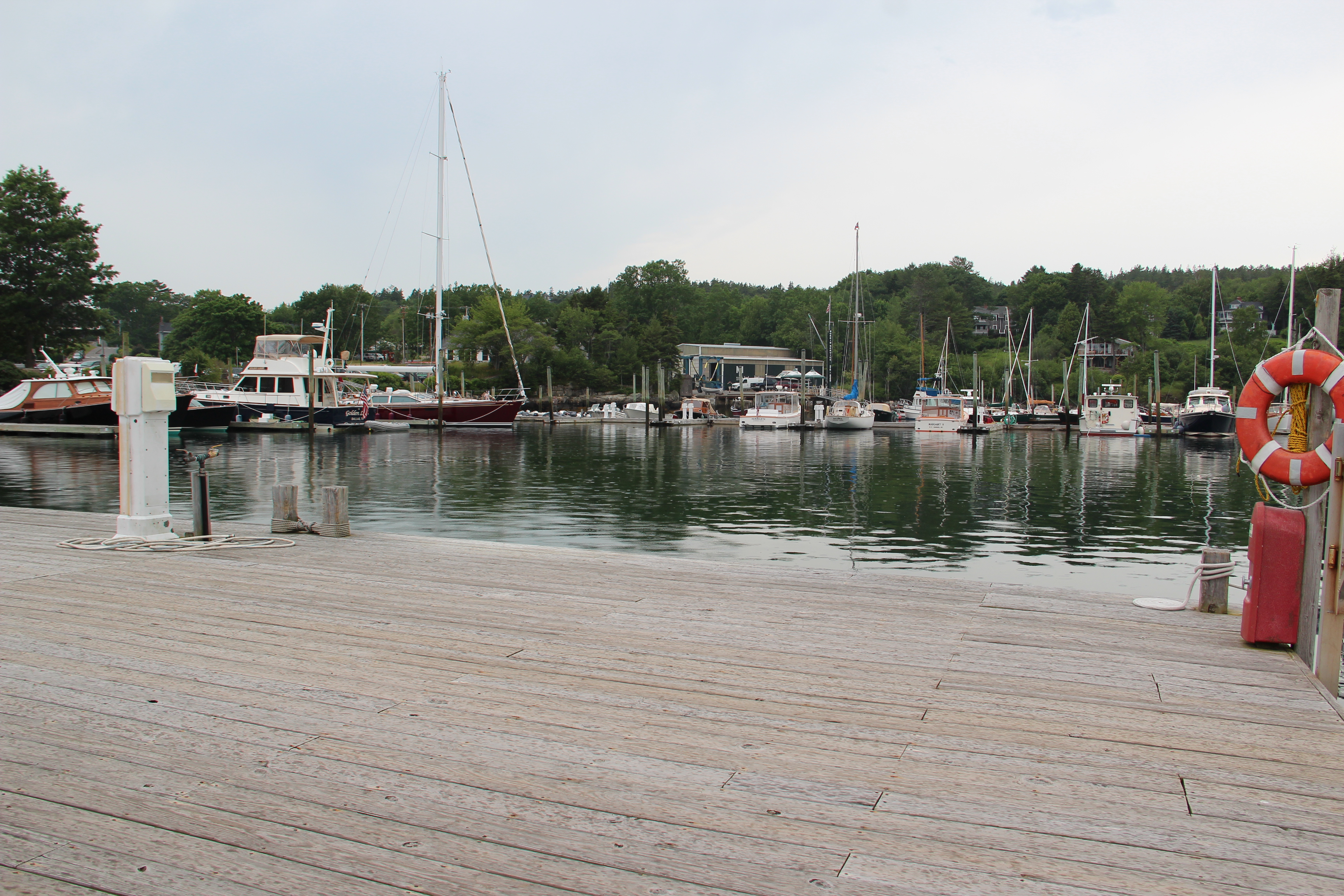
- Village of Northeast Harbor

- Seal

- Location within Maine Location within the United States
- Coordinates: 44°20′25″N 68°19′44″W
- Country: United States
- State: Maine
- County: Hancock
- Settled: 1762
- Incorporated (town): February 17, 1789
- Villages: Hall Quarry; Northeast Harbor; Otter Creek; Pretty Marsh; Seal Harbor; Somesville

Area
  - Total: 54.88 sq mi (142.14 km^{2})
  - Land: 36.88 sq mi (95.52 km^{2})
  - Water: 18.00 sq mi (46.62 km^{2})
- Elevation: 180 ft (55 m)

Population (2020)
  - Total: 2,146
  - Density: 58/sq mi (22.5/km^{2})
- Time zone: UTC-5 (Eastern (EST))
  - Summer (DST): UTC-4 (EDT)
- ZIP Codes: 04660 (Mount Desert); 04662 (Northeast Harbor); 04675 (Seal Harbor)
- Area code: 207
- FIPS code: 23-47630
- GNIS feature ID: 582611
- Website: www.mtdesert.org

Mount Desert is a town located on Mount Desert Island in Hancock County, Maine, United States. The population was 2,146 at the 2020 census. Incorporated in 1789, the town comprises the villages of Otter Creek, Seal Harbor, Northeast Harbor, Somesville, Hall Quarry, and Pretty Marsh.

== Geography ==
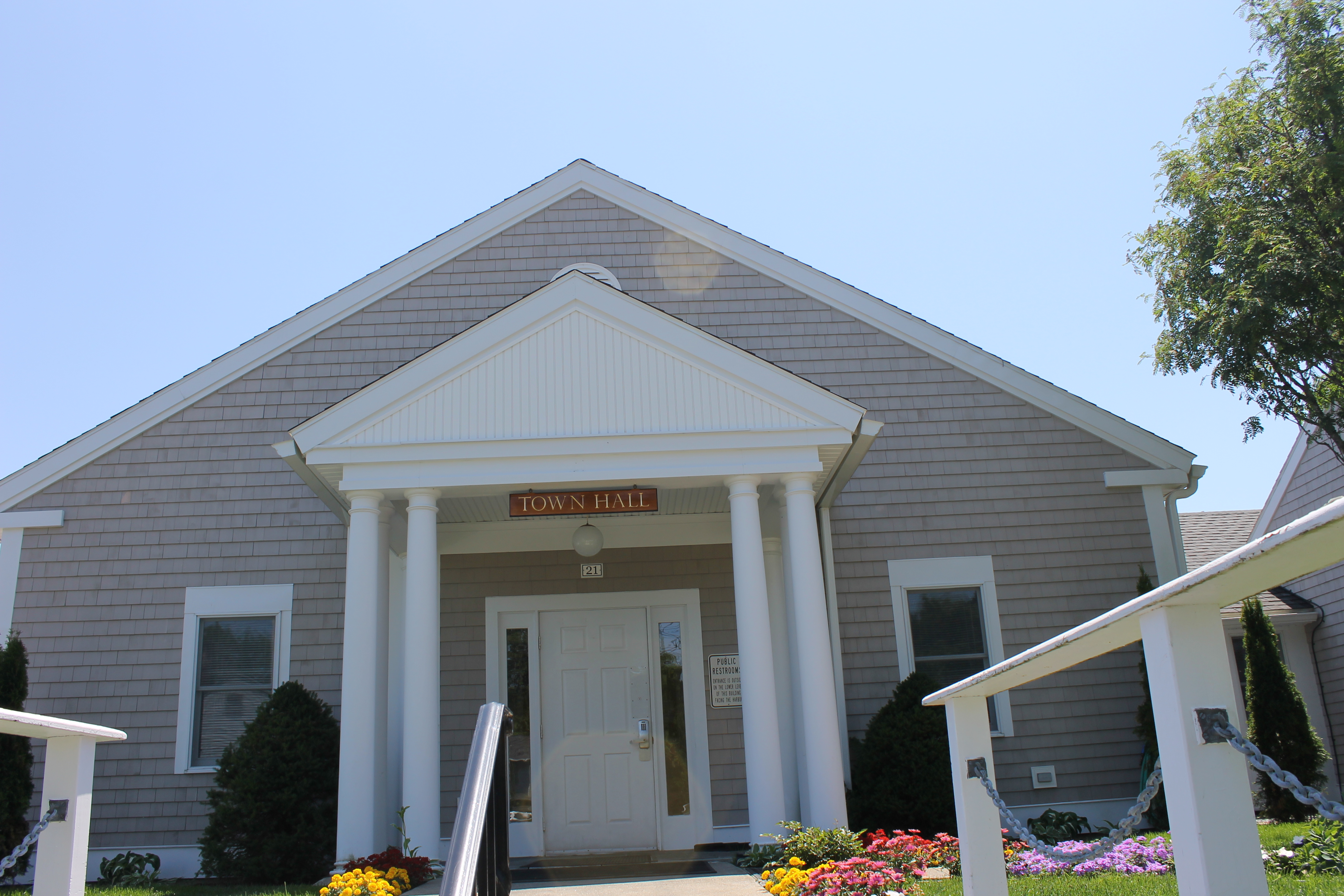
Mount Desert Town Hall

According to the United States Census Bureau, the town has a total area of 54.88 square miles (142.14 km^{2}), of which 36.88 square miles (95.52 km^{2}) is land and 18.00 square miles (46.62 km^{2}) is water.

== Demographics ==
Historical population
Census	Pop.	Note	%±
1790	744		—
1800	721		−3.1%
1810	1,047		45.2%
1820	1,349		28.8%
1830	1,603		18.8%
1840	1,887		17.7%
1850	782		−58.6%
1860	916		17.1%
1870	918		0.2%
1880	1,017		10.8%
1890	1,355		33.2%
1900	1,600		18.1%
1910	1,569		−1.9%
1920	1,497		−4.6%
1930	2,022		35.1%
1940	2,047		1.2%
1950	1,776		−13.2%
1960	1,663		−6.4%
1970	1,659		−0.2%
1980	2,063		24.4%
1990	1,899		−7.9%
2000	2,109		11.1%
2010	2,053		−2.7%
2020	2,146		4.5%
U.S. Decennial Census

=== 2010 census ===
As of the census of 2010, there were 2,053 people, 984 households, and 586 families living in the town. The population density was 55.7 inhabitants per square mile (21.5/km^{2}). There were 2,287 housing units at an average density of 62.0 per square mile (23.9/km^{2}). The racial makeup of the town was 98.1% White, 0.3% African American, 0.1% Native American, 0.7% Asian, 0.1% from other races, and 0.7% from two or more races. Hispanic or Latino of any race were 0.9% of the population.

There were 984 households, of which 20.9% had children under the age of 18 living with them, 51.0% were married couples living together, 5.7% had a female householder with no husband present, 2.8% had a male householder with no wife present, and 40.4% were non-families. 32.7% of all households were made up of individuals, and 11.8% had someone living alone who was 65 years of age or older. The average household size was 2.09 and the average family size was 2.64.

The median age in the town was 50.7 years. 16.5% of residents were under the age of 18; 5% were between the ages of 18 and 24; 19.2% were from 25 to 44; 37.8% were from 45 to 64; and 21.4% were 65 years of age or older. The gender makeup of the town was 48.2% male and 51.8% female.

=== 2000 census ===
As of the census of 2000, there were 2,109 people, 962 households, and 583 families living in the town. The population density was 57.1 inhabitants per square mile (22.0/km^{2}). There were 1,900 housing units at an average density of 51.5 per square mile (19.9/km^{2}). The racial makeup of the town was 98.62% White, 0.19% African American, 0.09% Native American, 0.09% Asian, 0.14% Pacific Islander, 0.24% from other races, and 0.62% from two or more races. Hispanic or Latino of any race were 0.62% of the population.

There were 962 households, out of which 23.7% had children under the age of 18 living with them, 51.1% were married couples living together, 6.8% had a female householder with no husband present, and 39.3% were non-families. 31.2% of all households were made up of individuals, and 13.0% had someone living alone who was 65 years of age or older. The average household size was 2.19 and the average family size was 2.76.

In the town, the population was spread out, with 20.6% under the age of 18, 4.2% from 18 to 24, 28.0% from 25 to 44, 29.5% from 45 to 64, and 17.7% who were 65 years of age or older. The median age was 44 years. For every 100 females, there were 90.2 males. For every 100 females age 18 and over, there were 85.6 males.

The median income for a household in the town was $41,321, and the median income for a family was $54,375. Males had a median income of $35,189 versus $27,358 for females. The per capita income for the town was $25,709. About 3.2% of families and 5.1% of the population were below the poverty line, including 4.2% of those under age 18 and 9.3% of those age 65 or over.

== Housing ==
As of 2024, the median house price in Mount Desert was $907,250, approximately 2.5x higher than the median house price in Maine.

== Education ==
Mount Desert is part of the Mount Desert Island Regional School System.

Schools in the district include Mount Desert Island High School, Conners Emerson School, Trenton Elementary School, Pemetic Elementary School, Frenchboro Elementary School, Tremont Consolidated School, Mount Desert Elementary School, Swan's Island Elementary School and Islesford Elementary School.

== Notable people ==
- Helen Gilman Noyes Brown (1867-1942), philanthropist
- William Adams Brown (1865-1943), minister, professor and philanthropist
- Martha Stewart (born 1941), television personality, owns a home in Seal Harbor

== See also ==
- Acadia National Park
- The Eyrie Summer Home
