= Rural Hall =

Rural Hall may refer to:

- Rural Hall, North Carolina, a town in Forsyth County
- Rural Hall (Surry, Maine), a historic community meeting place
