= Nannau =

Nannau may refer to:

- Nannau, Maine, a country estate in Maine, U.S.A.
- Nannau Hall, Gwynedd, a mansion in Wales, U.K.
