= Edgecliff =

Edgecliff may refer to:

== United States ==
- Edgecliff (Cincinnati, Ohio), historic building
- Edgecliff (Southwest Harbor, Maine), historic building
- Edgecliff (Winnetka, Illinois), historic building
- Edgecliff College, defunct women's private catholic college
- Edgecliff Village, Texas

== Australia ==
- Edgecliff, New South Wales
  - Edgecliff railway station

== See also ==
- Kinver High School (formerly Edgecliff High School)
