= Shore Acres =

Shore Acres or Shoreacres may refer to:

== Places ==
=== Canada ===
- Shoreacres, British Columbia, an unincorporated community
- Shoreacres, Ontario

=== United States ===
- Shore Acres, California, an unincorporated community
- Shore Acres (Lamoine Beach, Maine), a historic home
- Shore Acres (Madison County, New York) , a mansion near Cazenovia Lake, New York
- Shore Acres, Monroe County, New York, a hamlet in the town of Hamlin, New York
- Shore Acres, Staten Island, New York
- Shore Acres State Park, in Oregon
- Shoreacres, Texas, a city

== Other uses ==
- Shore Acres (play), a 1893 play by James A. Herne
- Shore Acres (1914 film), a silent film directed by John H. Pratt
- Shore Acres (1920 film), an American silent film
