= Garland House =

Garland House or Garland Farm may refer to:

in the United States

(by state then city)

- Augustus Garland House, Little Rock, Arkansas, listed on the National Register of Historic Places (NRHP)
- Garland House (Dubuque, Iowa), listed on the NRHP in Dubuque County
- Garland House (Bernice, Louisiana), listed on the NRHP in Union Parish
- Garland Farm, Bar Harbor, Maine, listed on the NRHP in Hancock County
- Garland-Buford House, Leasburg, North Carolina, listed on the NRHP in Caswell County
- Hamlin Garland House, West Salem, Wisconsin, listed on the NRHP in La Crosse County
