= Brown-Pilsbury Double House =

Historic house in Maine, United States

- U.S. National Register of Historic Places
- Location within Maine Location within the United States
- Location: 188–190 Franklin St., Bucksport, Maine, United States
- Coordinates: 44°34′26″N 68°47′49″W
- Area: less than one acre
- Built: 1808
- Architectural style: Federal
- NRHP reference No.: 97001129
- Added to NRHP: September 11, 1997

The Brown-Pilsbury Double House is a historic two-family house at 188–190 Franklin Street in Bucksport, Maine, United States. Built c. 1808, it is an architecturally distinctive and regionally rare example of an early 19th-century wood frame duplex. It was listed on the National Register of Historic Places in 1997.

== Description and history ==
The house is a 2 1/2-story wood-frame structure, finished in wooden clapboards, with a granite foundation and a side-gable roof, and is set on a lot at the southeast corner of Franklin and MacDonald Streets. A single-story gabled ell, probably of 19th-century construction, extends to the rear of the building from the eastern unit. There is an entry with Federal styling at the center of the north facade, but this is believed to be a late 19th-century alteration. The two units of the duplex are entered through entrances on the eastern and western facades, the eastern one with a Federal style surround and the western one with a later Greek Revival treatment.

The interiors of the two units are nearly identical in their layout. Both have a narrow vestibule with a winding staircase leading to the second floor, with doors leading to the basement, kitchen (on the north side) and parlor (on the south). The kitchens have large hearths with original beehive ovens, and the parlors feature finely carved Federal style fireplace surrounds. The attic of the building is distinctive, consisting originally of a single large barrel-vaulted space behind the chimneys. It is believed this space may have been used as a Masonic Lodge meeting hall; it has since been divided between the units.

The house was built c. 1808 for business partners John Hillyard Brown and Moody Pilsbury, both natives of New Hampshire. Both men were active in the civic and economic activity of the community, and were known to be involved in the local Masonic Lodge. Both were apparently financially ruined by the embargoes surrounding the War of 1812. One side of the house served for a time as a parsonage for the nearby Methodist church.

== See also ==
- National Register of Historic Places listings in Hancock County, Maine
