= Sedgwick Historic District =

Historic district in Maine, United States

- U.S. National Register of Historic Places
- U.S. Historic district
- Location within Maine Location within the United States
- Location: Jct. of ME 172 and Old County Rd., Sedgwick, Maine
- Area: 30 acres (12 ha)
- Built: 1793
- Architectural style: Greek Revival
- NRHP reference No.: 94001550
- Added to NRHP: January 20, 1995

The Sedgwick Historic District encompasses the historic and traditional rural center of the small town of Sedgwick, Maine. Located at the junction of Maine State Route 172 and Old County Road, the district includes the town's 1793 meeting house, which still serves as town hall, the c. 1795 Daniel Merrill House, built for the town's first minister, the 1821 town pound, and its first cemetery. The district was listed on the National Register of Historic Places in 1995.

== Description and history ==
The town of Sedgwick was first settled by white settlers in the 1760s, and was incorporated in 1789. In 1791 the town voted to raise funds for the construction of a meeting house and a house for a minister. The meeting house, which was originally used for both religious and civic purposes, was built in 1793, and altered 1849 to reflect its conversion to exclusively civic purposes. Across the main road (now Route 172) to the west they built the ministerial residence, first occupied by Rev. Daniel Merrill. Part of the land granted to Rev. Merrill was taken for use as the community's first burial ground in 1798. Part of the town common, which was laid out in front of the meeting house, was taken in 1821 for the construction of a stone animal pound, whose walls are still partially standing. This complex was located at the geographic center of Sedgwick, which initially included all of Brooklin to the east and part of Brooksville to the west; these two communities were separated from Sedgwick before 1849, and the town's economic activities were focused on coastal villages. The meeting house continues to serve municipal functions, and the Merrill House is now owned by the local historical society and is open as a museum, along with an old schoolhouse that was rebuilt on the property.

== See also ==
- National Register of Historic Places listings in Hancock County, Maine
