= Cover Farm =

Historic house in Maine, United States

- U.S. National Register of Historic Places
- U.S. Historic district
- Location within Maine Location within the United States
- Location: Off ME 3 W side, 0.3 mi. NW of jct. with Crooked Rd., Hulls Cove, Maine
- Coordinates: 44.41774°N 68.25498°W
- Area: 26.2 acres (10.6 ha)
- Built: 1810
- Architectural style: Federal, Greek Revival, Colonial Revival
- NRHP reference No.: 95001464
- Added to NRHP: December 14, 1995

The Cover Farm is an historic farmstead on Maine State Route 3 in the Hulls Cove village of Bar Harbor, Maine on Mount Desert Island. Its centerpiece is an early 19th-century Cape, set on a parcel of land owned until 1810 by the granddaughter of the island's original French proprietor, Antoine de la Mothe Cadillac. In the early 20th century, the property was transformed into a summer estate, with the addition of a Colonial Revival wing and a walled garden. The property was listed on the National Register of Historic Places in 1995.

== Description ==
Cover Farm consists of 26 acres (11 ha) of land, facing Frenchman Bay in the Hulls Cove area of Bar Harbor. The main house is located at the end of Cover Farm Road, a private road extending westward from Maine State Route 3. Its main block is a 1 1/2-story wood frame Cape, five bays wide, covered in wood shingles, with a central chimney and a granite foundation. A long gambrel-roofed wing extends to the north, and a gable-roofed wing extends to the west (rear) of the main house. The main entrance is framed by a Greek Revival surround. South of the house stands a formal walled garden.

The history of the property has its roots in the early settlement of Mount Desert Island, whose first acknowledged European proprietor was Antoine de la Mothe Cadillac (for whom Cadillac Mountain is named). Following British conquest of the area in the French and Indian War, the island was granted to Massachusetts Governor Francis Bernard. The island was seized by the state of Massachusetts (which present-day Maine was then part of) in the American Revolutionary War, since Bernard was a Loyalist. Bernard's son John, however, had sided with the rebel cause, and both he and Cadillac's granddaughter Marie Therese de Gregoire filed claims for the land. These claims were adjudicated by granting John Bernard the western half of the island, and de Gregoire the eastern half.

Although de Gregoire family tradition claims that this house was built by them, documentary and architectural evidence suggests this house was built after they sold the property on which this house stands in 1806. It was more likely built by the Cutlers, who owned the property from 1810 to 1834. The Greek Revival treatments were probably added by the next owners, the Peaches. The next significant owner was Mrs. Olive Tilton, who acquired the property in 1917. She was responsible for adding the gambrel-roofed wing and the walled garden, marking the property's transformation from a farm to a summer residence. She also gave the property its current name.

== See also ==
- National Register of Historic Places listings in Hancock County, Maine
