= Higgins Barn =

- U.S. National Register of Historic Places
- Location within Maine Location within the United States
- Location: 256 Oak Hill Road, Indian Point, Bar Harbor, Maine
- Coordinates: 44°22′48″N 68°21′48″W
- Area: less than one acre
- Built: 1910
- NRHP reference No.: 03001502
- Added to NRHP: January 28, 2004

The Higgins Barn is a historic English barn at 256 Oak Hill Road in Indian Point, a rural area in western Bar Harbor, Maine. It is estimated to have been built c. 1810 by Ichabod Higgins, and is one of the oldest structures in the area, dating to the first settlement period of Indian Point. The barn was listed on the National Register of Historic Places in 2004.

== Description and history ==
The Higgins Barn is set on the west side of Oak Hill Road, about 325 feet (99 m) from the roadway. The property also includes a c. 1830-40s Cape house, which has been extensively altered, a family cemetery, and several other outbuildings. The barn, 1-1/2 stories in height, measures 30 by 40 feet (9.1 m × 12.2 m), and is oriented with its front (located on a long side, as is typical for English barns) facing east. Constructed of hand-hewn timbers, it is set on a fieldstone foundation, and has a side-gable roof. The walls are sheathed in a variety of wood shingles, some of which are typical clipped and rounded shingles of the Late Victorian period. The main facade has an off-center double sliding door sheltered by a wide portico, with a window at the first floor level to one side and a second at loft height on the other. The upper southernmost part of the barn slightly overhangs an open area used for wood storage and a chicken yard; this is a later 19th-century alteration. The main access door on the west side, originally matching that on the east side, has been closed off and the space partly taken up by two windows. The interior has a typical English barn layout, with a central wide hall, with animal stalls to either side, with hay lofts above. The stalls on the left have been partly disassembled due to the installation of milking equipment.

Indian Point is located on the northwestern part of Mount Desert Island. Members of the Higgins family were among the first to settle the island in 1763, and Ichabod Higgins' parents moved to the island from Cape Cod in 1778. A deed transferring 100 acres (40 ha) of land at Indian Point from John Barnard, one of the island's early owners, to Ichabod Higgins was recorded in May 1811. Higgins had by then died, but his estate was recorded to include a house and barn, indicating he had probably been on the land for some time. The land in this area remained in the hands of Higgins descendants and in agricultural use for many years, and the parcel including the house and barn was 40 acres (16 ha) in size in 1981, when it was subdivided for development.

== See also ==
- National Register of Historic Places listings in Hancock County, Maine
