= First Baptist Church (East Lamoine, Maine) =

Historic church in Maine, United States

- U.S. National Register of Historic Places
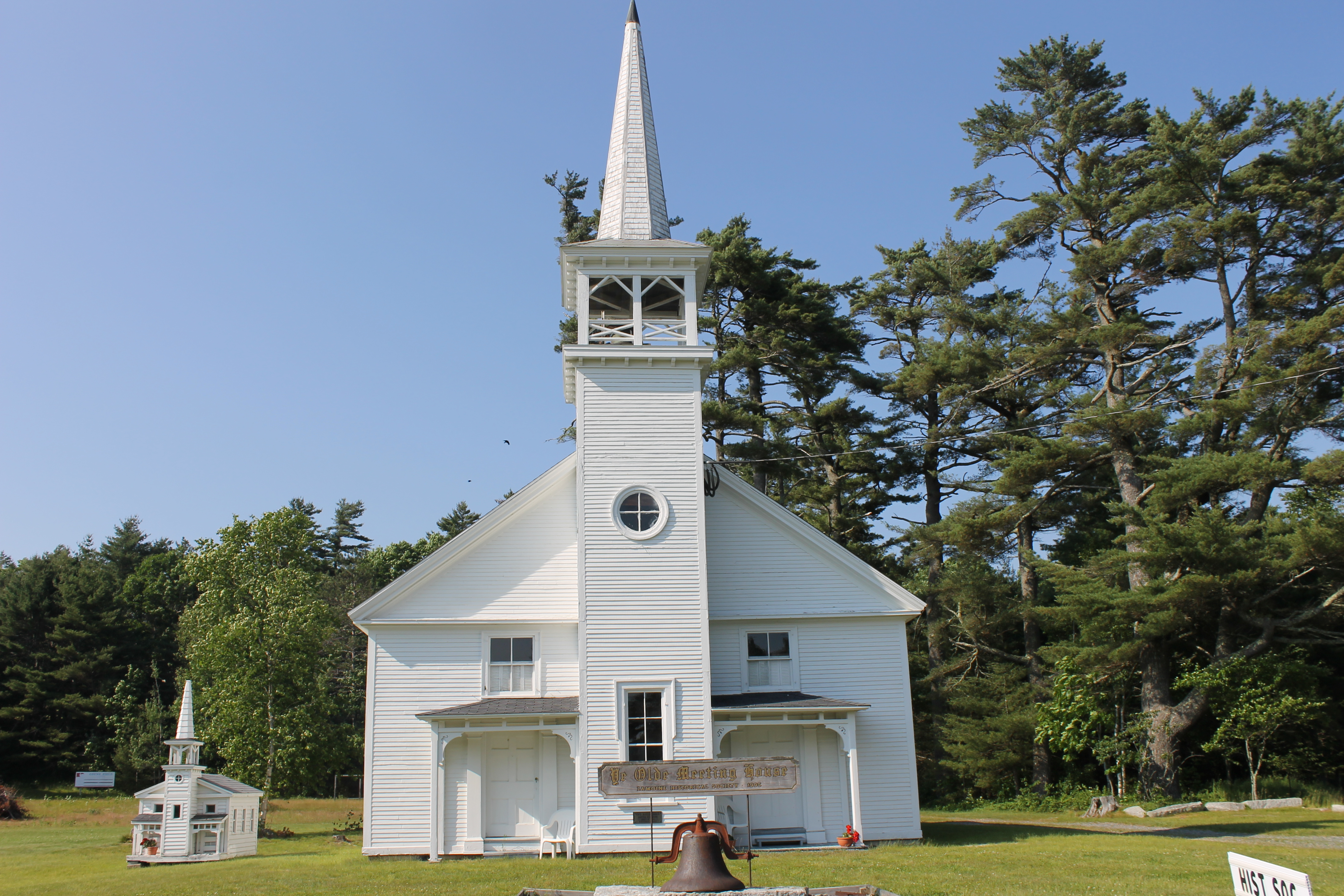

- Location within Maine Location within the United States
- Location: 362 Lamoine Beach Rd., E. Lamoine, Maine
- Coordinates: 44°28′3″N 68°19′17″W
- Area: less than one acre
- Built: 1832
- Architect: Tisdale, Seth J.
- Architectural style: Greek Revival, Late Victorian
- NRHP reference No.: 01000817
- Added to NRHP: August 2, 2001

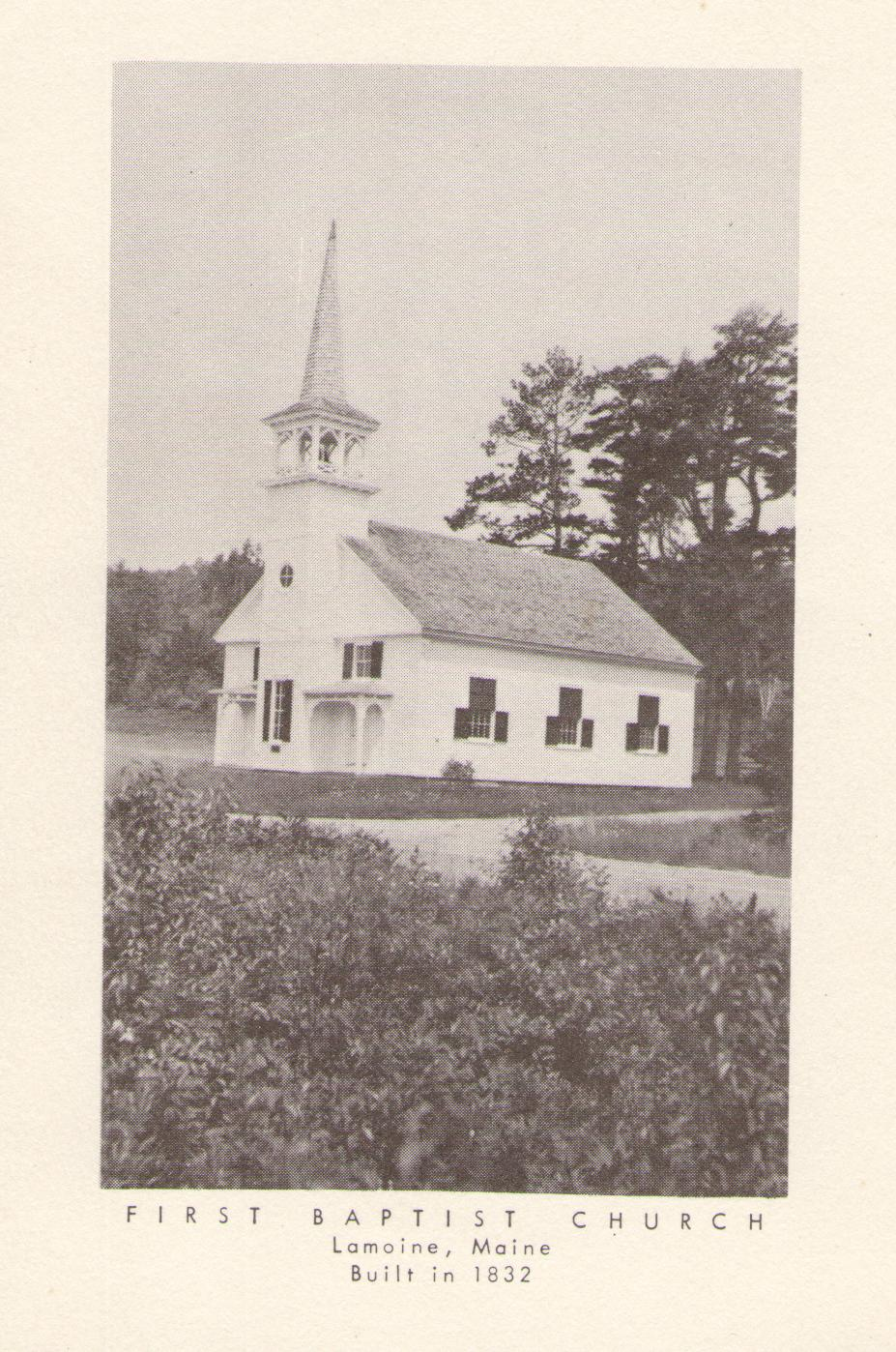
First Baptist Church of Lamoine, Maine

The First Baptist Church is a historic church building at 362 Lamoine Beach Road in East Lamoine, Maine. The wood frame Greek Revival building was built in 1832 by a noted local builder/architect, and was altered in 1879 to include a Victorian tower and porches. The building was listed on the National Register of Historic Places in 2001.

== Description and history ==
The First Baptist Church is a single-story wood-frame structure, with a front gable roof, clapboard siding, and a concrete foundation. A tower projects from its front facade, flanked on either side by hip-roof porches with bracketed columns and chamfered posts. The tower has a bullseye window at its middle stage, and an open belfry stage with decorative Stick woodwork, and is topped by an octagonal steeple. The two entrances, still framed by Greek Revival surrounds, lead into separate vestibule areas, from which stairs lead to the gallery, and entry is gained to the main sanctuary. The nave has rows of bench pews (replacements in 1852 of the original box pews).

Lamoine's Baptist congregation was established in the early 19th century, and this building was built for it in 1932 by Seth Tisdale, a noted local builder and designer. The congregation split in the 1840s, resulting in the construction of another church in the town, although the two congregations later reunited. This building was altered in 1879 to designs by Asa Hodgkins, a noted builder from Ellsworth, to replace the tower and add the porches in the then fashionable Italianate and Stick style. In the 20th century the building was deeded to the cemetery association that controls the cemetery behind the building, and it was given by them to the local historical society in the 1970s. The building was moved back one length in the 1980s, at which time it was set on a new foundation.

== See also ==
- National Register of Historic Places listings in Hancock County, Maine
