= East Blue Hill Library =

- U.S. National Register of Historic Places
- Location within Maine Location within the United States
- Location: 9 Curtis Cove Rd., East Blue Hill, Maine
- Coordinates: 44°25′1″N 68°31′21″W
- Area: less than one acre
- Built: 1920
- Architect: John W. Merrow
- Architectural style: Bungalow/craftsman
- NRHP reference No.: 90000577
- Added to NRHP: April 5, 1990

The East Blue Hill Library is a public library at 9 Curtis Cove Road, in the village of East Blue Hill, Maine. It is located in an architecturally distinctive yet diminutive Craftsman building, designed by John W. Merrow and built in 1919–20, that is listed on the National Register of Historic Places. The library is open four days a week.

== Architecture and history ==
The early history of library services in East Blue Hill is obscure, starting (according to local lore) with an organization of "Willing Workers" that amassed a small collection of books. The campaign to build the present building was begun in 1914 with the acquisition of land, with major fundraising undertaken in 1917. The building, completed in 1920, is based on a design sketched by John W. Merrow, a New York City theatrical architect.

The building is a small single-story square wood-frame structure, with a hip roof, granite foundation, weatherboard siding, and a stone chimney at one side. The main entrance (on the north facade) is sheltered by a porch, which has shingled posts and an elaborate framework supporting an eyelid-shaped roof. To the right of the porch is a bank of three six-over-one sash windows. The building's interior is roughly divided into three functional areas: at the entrance is a vestibule area, with a fireplaced reading room to the right, and a room of stacks behind. The stack room consists of floor-to-ceiling wooden shelving. All of the interior trim is painted except for the doors.

== See also ==
- National Register of Historic Places listings in Hancock County, Maine
