= Duck Cove School =

- U.S. National Register of Historic Places
- Location within Maine Location within the United States
- Nearest city: Bucksport, Maine
- Coordinates: 44°35′36″N 68°44′33″W
- Area: less than one acre
- Built: 1895
- Built by: Uriah A. Smith
- Architectural style: Late Victorian
- NRHP reference No.: 93000640
- Added to NRHP: July 15, 1993

The Duck Cove School is a historic former school building at 429 Maine State Route 46 (south of junction with Duck Cove Road) in Bucksport, Maine. Built in 1895, this wood frame one-room schoolhouse served as a school until 1943, and been owned by a local community organization since. It was listed on the National Register of Historic Places in 1993.

== Description and history ==
The schoolhouse is a single-story wood-frame structure, with a side gable roof, weatherboard and shingle siding, and a foundation of stone piers. Atypically for Maine schoolhouses of the 19th century, it has an engaged porch and vestibule on the front (northwest) facade. The porch is supported by turned posts with braces. The northeast gable is finished in shingles, and there is a truss-shaped Stick style gable ornament in the peak. The interior is finished with vertical board wainscoting, original blackboards, and a 1927 pressed metal roof.

The town of Bucksport had eighteen school districts at its height in 1859. Over the course of the second half of the 19th century it experienced a significant decline in population, resulting in the closure and consolidation of many schools. This school was built in 1895 to replace a dilapidated older structure, after long public debate over whether to consolidate further rather than build a new building. The building served the town until 1943. It was transferred to the Duck Cove Community Club, which has maintained it and used it has a clubhouse since then.

== See also ==
- National Register of Historic Places listings in Hancock County, Maine
