= Lucerne Inn =

- U.S. National Register of Historic Places
- Location within Maine Location within the United States
- Nearest city: Dedham, Maine
- Coordinates: 44°42′10″N 68°35′59″W
- Area: 0.3 acres (0.12 ha)
- Built: 1815
- Built by: Nathan Phillips
- Architectural style: Colonial Revival
- NRHP reference No.: 82000742
- Added to NRHP: June 16, 1982

The Lucerne Inn is a historic hotel and restaurant at 2517 Main Road (United States Route 1A) in Dedham, Maine. Its main house built in 1818 and repeatedly enlarged and renovated, the Lucerne Inn has served travelers for more than 200 years. In the 1920s it was the centerpiece of an ultimately unsuccessful effort to develop a resort catering to the wealthy on nearby Phillips Lake. The inn was listed on the National Register of Historic Places in 1982.

== Description and history ==
The Lucerne Inn is set on the west side of Route 1A, roughly midway between Bangor and Ellsworth. Its main building is a 2-1/2 story wood frame structure, six bays wide, with a hip roof, clapboard siding, and a brick and granite foundation. A porch extends across the east-facing front, supported by paired Tuscan columns. To either side of this main block there are three bay extensions with front-gable roof, that on the left side further extended by an enclosed porch area.

One of Dedham's early settlers, Nathan Phillips, established a traveler's accommodation near this site in 1810. Under the auspices of his son the property grew to assume its present dimensions, and was known as the "Lake House". In 1925 this property, as well as all of the land surrounding Phillips Lake, was acquired by New York investor Harold M. Saddlemire, who proposed to a major resort development called "Lucerne-in-Maine". The Lake House was moved a short way to its present location and given a then-modern Colonial Revival restyling, with the intent that it would serve as a clubhouse for the facilities. A series of roads and house lots were laid out, the golf club (now the Lucerne-in-Maine Golf Club) was established, and a log lodge was built for the exclusive use of resort members. The resort had the support of a significant portion of the state's political and business elite. However, mismanagement of its funds, combined with the effects of the Great Depression, spelled the failure of the enterprise.

== Today ==
The inn today offers rooms and suites, and has a dining room with a view overlooking the lake. Other amenities include a swimming pool, indoor and outdoor seating areas, and gazebos.

== See also ==
- National Register of Historic Places listings in Hancock County, Maine
