= National Register of Historic Places listings in Hancock County, Maine =

Location of Hancock County in Maine

This is a list of the National Register of Historic Places listings in Hancock County, Maine.

This is intended to be a complete list of the properties and districts on the National Register of Historic Places in Hancock County, Maine, United States. Latitude and longitude coordinates are provided for many National Register properties and districts; these locations may be seen together in a map.

There are 136 properties and districts listed on the National Register in the county, including two National Historic Landmarks. Another three properties were once listed but have been removed.

This National Park Service list is complete through NPS recent listings posted October 16, 2026.

Contents: Counties and municipalities in Maine
Androscoggin - Aroostook - Cumberland (City of Portland) - Franklin - Hancock - Kennebec - Knox - Lincoln - Oxford - Penobscot - Piscataquis - Sagadahoc - Somerset - Waldo - Washington - York

== Current listings ==
	Name on the Register	Image	Date listed	Location	City or town	Description
1	Robert Abbe Museum of Stone Antiquities	Robert Abbe Museum of Stone Antiquities	January 19, 1983 (#83000451)	South of Bar Harbor off State Route 3; 44°21′40″N 68°12′30″W	Bar Harbor	
2	Agassiz Bedrock Outcrop	Agassiz Bedrock Outcrop	February 13, 2003 (#03000014)	406 State St. 44°33′40″N 68°26′19″W	Ellsworth	
3	Baker Island Light Station	Baker Island Light Station	March 14, 1988 (#88000046)	Baker Island in Acadia National Park; 44°14′28″N 68°11′56″W	Islesford	First light station serving Mount Desert Island—established in 1828—with a surviving 1855 light tower and keeper's house.
4	Barncastle	Barncastle	November 10, 1980 (#80000219)	125 South St. 44°23′51″N 68°35′18″W	Blue Hill	
5	Bass Harbor Head Light Station	Bass Harbor Head Light Station	January 21, 1988 (#87002273)	Bass Harbor Head; 44°13′19″N 68°20′16″W	Bass Harbor	
6	Bass Harbor Memorial Library	Bass Harbor Memorial Library	August 5, 2009 (#09000593)	89 Bernard Rd. 44°14′28″N 68°21′20″W	Tremont	
7	Bear Island Light Station	Bear Island Light Station	March 14, 1988 (#88000043)	Bear Island, Acadia National Park; 44°17′00″N 68°16′14″W	Northeast Harbor	Light station established in 1839 to serve Northeast Harbor, with a surviving 1889 light tower and keeper's house and 1905 outbuildings.
8	Beth Eden Chapel	Beth Eden Chapel	August 2, 2001 (#01000818)	Naskeag Point Rd. at Stubbs Dr. 44°14′05″N 68°31′56″W	Brooklin	
9	Black Mansion	Black Mansion	December 23, 1969 (#69000026)	W. Main St. (State Route 172); 44°32′12″N 68°26′21″W	Ellsworth	
10	Blackwoods Campground	Blackwoods Campground	June 29, 2007 (#07000612)	State Route 233, Eagle Lake Rd. 44°18′38″N 68°12′15″W	Bar Harbor	
11	Blue Hill Historic District	Blue Hill Historic District	December 8, 1980 (#80000220)	State Routes 15, 172, 176, and 177; 44°24′49″N 68°35′22″W	Blue Hill	
12	BOWDOIN (schooner)	BOWDOIN (schooner)	February 12, 1980 (#80000411)	Maine Maritime Academy; 44°23′12″N 68°47′48″W	Castine	
13	Brick School House	Brick School House	April 23, 1980 (#80000221)	School House Hill; 44°50′51″N 68°19′43″W	Aurora	
14	Brooklin IOOF Hall	Brooklin IOOF Hall	January 26, 1990 (#89002341)	State Route 175; 44°15′55″N 68°34′51″W	Brooklin	
15	Brown-Pilsbury Double House		September 11, 1997 (#97001129)	188-190 Franklin St. 44°34′26″N 68°47′49″W	Bucksport	
16	Buck Memorial Library	Buck Memorial Library	December 30, 1987 (#87002193)	Maine St. 44°34′17″N 68°47′32″W	Bucksport	
17	Bucksport Railroad Station	Bucksport Railroad Station	April 28, 1975 (#75000091)	Main St. 44°34′19″N 68°47′50″W	Bucksport	
18	Burnt Coat Harbor Light Station	Burnt Coat Harbor Light Station	January 21, 1988 (#87002272)	Hockamock Head; 44°08′03″N 68°26′52″W	Swans Island	
19	Carriage Paths, Bridges and Gatehouses	Carriage Paths, Bridges and Gatehouses	November 14, 1979 (#79000131)	Acadia National Park and vicinity 44°20′32″N 68°15′30″W	Acadia National Park	Network of scenic carriage roads with 13 bridges and two gatehouse complexes, established 1919–1931 by John D. Rockefeller Jr. for automobile-free recreation by high-society vacationers. Now open to non-motorized use by the public.
20	Castine Historic District	Castine Historic District	February 23, 1973 (#73000240)	Roughly bounded by the Bagaduce and Penobscot rivers, and by Wadsworth Cove Rd. 44°23′27″N 68°48′19″W	Castine	
21	Cate House	Cate House	January 26, 1970 (#70000040)	Corner of Court and Pleasant Sts. 44°23′18″N 68°48′01″W	Castine	
22	Church of Our Father		July 1, 1999 (#99000770)	State Route 3, 0.5 miles (0.80 km) north of Crooked Rd. 44°25′15″N 68°15′02″W	Hulls Cove	
23	Claremont Hotel	Claremont Hotel	March 29, 1978 (#78000162)	Claremont Rd. 44°16′44″N 68°18′46″W	Southwest Harbor	
24	Cleftstone		September 24, 1999 (#99001192)	92 Eden St. 44°23′36″N 68°13′19″W	Bar Harbor	
25	Cover Farm		December 14, 1995 (#95001464)	Off the western side of State Route 3, 0.3 miles (0.48 km) northwest of its junction with Crooked Rd. 44°25′05″N 68°15′18″W	Hulls Cove	
26	Criterion Theatre	Criterion Theatre	April 23, 1980 (#80000222)	35 Cottage St. 44°23′24″N 68°12′23″W	Bar Harbor	
27	Crosby Lodge		January 2, 2025 (#100011223)	15 Oak Street; 44°27′57″N 68°13′48″W	Hancock	
28	Dix Family Stable		April 5, 1990 (#90000578)	State Route 102A; 44°14′33″N 68°20′41″W	Bass Harbor	
29	Duck Cove School		July 15, 1993 (#93000640)	Eastern side of State Route 46 at its junction with Stubbs Brook Rd. 44°35′36″N 68°44′33″W	Bucksport	
30	East Blue Hill Library		April 5, 1990 (#90000577)	Miliken Rd. 44°25′01″N 68°31′21″W	East Blue Hill	
31	East Blue Hill Post Office		February 12, 2003 (#03000016)	13 Curtis Cove Rd. 44°25′01″N 68°31′20″W	East Blue Hill	
32	Eastbrook Baptist Church and Eastbrook Town House		December 18, 1978 (#78000163)	State Route 200; 44°40′42″N 68°16′00″W	Eastbrook	
33	Edgecliff		October 16, 2013 (#13000835)	34 Norwood Ln. 44°17′04″N 68°19′02″W	Southwest Harbor	
34	Eegonos	Eegonos	January 15, 1980 (#80000223)	145 Eden St. 44°24′15″N 68°13′58″W	Bar Harbor	
35	Egg Rock Light Station	Egg Rock Light Station	January 21, 1988 (#87002270)	Egg Rock in Frenchman Bay; 44°21′13″N 68°08′20″W	Winter Harbor	
36	Ellsworth City Hall	Ellsworth City Hall	January 10, 1986 (#86000073)	City Hall Plaza; 44°32′33″N 68°25′27″W	Ellsworth	
37	Ellsworth Commercial Historic District		March 20, 2026 (#100012836)	51-192 Main Street, 4-16 State Street, 6-30 Water Street; 44°32′29″N 68°25′29″W	Ellsworth	
38	Ellsworth Congregational Church	Ellsworth Congregational Church	April 23, 1973 (#73000108)	State St. 44°32′37″N 68°25′52″W	Ellsworth	
39	Ellsworth Power House and Dam	Ellsworth Power House and Dam	June 20, 1985 (#85001262)	Union River; 44°32′39″N 68°25′50″W	Ellsworth	
40	Elm Street Congregational Church and Parish House	Elm Street Congregational Church and Parish House	June 14, 1990 (#90000925)	Junction of Elm and Franklin Sts. 44°34′24″N 68°47′41″W	Bucksport	
41	James Emery House		August 13, 1974 (#74000151)	Main St. 44°34′23″N 68°47′48″W	Bucksport	
42	Far From the Wolf		November 27, 2023 (#100008476)	120 West Oval; 44°22′47″N 68°05′51″W	Winter Harbor	
43	The Farm House		November 7, 2007 (#07001152)	15 Highbrook Rd. 44°23′18″N 68°13′09″W	Bar Harbor	
44	Fernald Point Prehistoric Site		July 21, 1978 (#78000164)	Fernald Point; 44°17′53″N 68°18′35″W	Southwest Harbor	
45	First Baptist Church	First Baptist Church	August 2, 2001 (#01000817)	362 Lamoine Beach Rd. 44°28′03″N 68°19′17″W	East Lamoine	
46	First Baptist Church		April 24, 1973 (#73000109)	Off State Route 172; 44°18′16″N 68°36′52″W	Sedgwick	
47	Flye Point 2		April 15, 1985 (#85000842)	Address Restricted	Brooklin	
48	Forest Farm		December 29, 2025 (#100012456)	372 Harborside Road; 44°19′36″N 68°49′04″W	Brooksville	
49	Fort George	Fort George	December 30, 1969 (#69000007)	Wadsworth St. off Battle Ave. 44°23′27″N 68°48′22″W	Castine	A British fort during the American Revolution and the site of the Penobscot Expedition
50	The Free Baptist Church of Great Pond		October 31, 2012 (#12000892)	1231 Great Pond Rd. 44°56′14″N 68°16′50″W	Great Pond	
51	Garland Farm		October 19, 2005 (#05001174)	1029 State Route 3; 44°25′40″N 68°19′30″W	Bar Harbor	
52	Gavin Watson Site		March 18, 1987 (#87000415)	Address Restricted	Sullivan	
53	Daniel Coit Gilman Summer Home		October 15, 1966 (#66000093)	Off Huntington Rd. 44°17′30″N 68°16′56″W	Northeast Harbor	
54	Goddard Site		May 7, 1979 (#79000132)	Address Restricted	Brooklin	
55	The Grand	The Grand	August 1, 2012 (#12000452)	163, 165, 167, 169, & 173 Main St. 44°32′30″N 68°25′22″W	Ellsworth	
56	Granite Store	Granite Store	December 16, 1974 (#74000152)	U.S. Route 1; 44°31′12″N 68°11′57″W	Sullivan	
57	Great Duck Island Light Station	Great Duck Island Light Station	March 14, 1988 (#88000159)	Southern tip of Great Duck Island; 44°08′32″N 68°14′46″W	Frenchboro	
58	Edward J. Hammond Hall		January 14, 2004 (#03001405)	Main St. 44°23′28″N 68°05′23″W	Winter Harbor	
59	Hancock County Jail	Hancock County Jail	January 24, 2008 (#07001445)	40 State St. 44°32′32″N 68°25′34″W	Ellsworth	
60	Hancock Point School		April 23, 2013 (#13000187)	644 Point Rd. 44°29′15″N 68°14′55″W	Hancock	
61	Harbor Lane-Eden Street Historic District		July 22, 2009 (#09000550)	Portions of Harbor Ln. and Eden St. 44°23′22″N 68°13′02″W	Bar Harbor	
62	Squire Ignatius Haskell House		February 3, 1978 (#78000165)	20 Main Street; 44°13′26″N 68°40′49″W	Deer Isle	Now Pilgrim's Inn.
63	Haystack Mountain School of Crafts		December 23, 2005 (#05001469)	89 Haystack School Dr. 44°11′19″N 68°35′05″W	Deer Isle	
64	Phineas Heywood House	Phineas Heywood House	January 7, 1988 (#87002194)	343 Maine St. 44°34′19″N 68°47′42″W	Bucksport	
65	Higgins Barn		January 28, 2004 (#03001502)	256 Oak Hill Rd. 44°22′48″N 68°21′48″W	Indian Point	
66	Highseas	Highseas	November 30, 1978 (#78000326)	South of Bar Harbor on Schooner Head Rd. 44°21′21″N 68°11′01″W	Bar Harbor	Highseas was built in 1912 as a private summer estate. It is now a residence hall owned by The Jackson Laboratory.
67	Ward Hinckley House		December 16, 1974 (#74000153)	Address Restricted	Blue Hill	
68	Hulls Cove High School		March 25, 1999 (#99000374)	State Route 3, 0.4 miles (0.64 km) north of its junction with Crooked Rd. 44°25′11″N 68°15′03″W	Hulls Cove	
69	Islesford Historical Museum and Blue Ducks Ships Store	Islesford Historical Museum and Blue Ducks Ships Store	September 30, 1980 (#80000224)	Little Cranberry Island; 44°15′42″N 68°14′25″W	Islesford	
70	Col. Charles and Mary Ann Jarvis Homestead		January 15, 2004 (#03001403)	10 Surry Rd. 44°32′18″N 68°25′46″W	Ellsworth	
71	Jesup Memorial Library	Jesup Memorial Library	April 1, 1991 (#91000323)	34 Mt. Desert St. 44°23′12″N 68°12′25″W	Bar Harbor	
72	Jonathan Fisher Memorial	Jonathan Fisher Memorial	December 30, 1969 (#69000031)	Southwest of Blue Hill on State Route 15 (Outer Main St.); 44°24′18″N 68°35′51″W	Blue Hill	
73	Col. Meltiah Jordan House	Col. Meltiah Jordan House	August 13, 1974 (#74000154)	20 State St. 44°32′32″N 68°25′32″W	Ellsworth	Houses the Ellsworth Public Library; misspelled "Jordon" in the National Register.
74	John Innes Kane Cottage	John Innes Kane Cottage	March 26, 1992 (#92000275)	Off the southeastern end of Hancock St. 44°23′09″N 68°11′53″W	Bar Harbor	
75	Lucerne Inn		June 16, 1982 (#82000742)	Bar Harbor Rd., U.S. Route 1A; 44°42′10″N 68°35′59″W	Dedham	
76	Moonspring Hermitage		December 9, 2021 (#100007256)	532 Morgan Bay Rd. 44°27′38″N 68°29′12″W	Surry	
77	Moore-Mayo House		September 22, 2004 (#04001050)	Lighthouse Rd. 44°13′44″N 68°20′22″W	Bass Harbor	
78	Mount Desert Island Hiking Trail System	Mount Desert Island Hiking Trail System	April 8, 2022 (#100007602)	Mount Desert Island; 44°20′23″N 68°16′20″W	Bar Harbor and vicinity	
79	Mount Desert Light Station	Mount Desert Light Station	March 14, 1988 (#88000155)	Mount Desert Rock; 43°58′07″N 68°07′43″W	Frenchboro	Mount Desert Light Station now operates as a research field station, and is owned by College of the Atlantic.
80	Nannau		November 8, 1984 (#84000322)	Lower Main St. 44°22′31″N 68°11′45″W	Bar Harbor	
81	Nazi Spy Landing Site		February 13, 2003 (#03000015)	Western shore of Crabtree Neck at Sunset Ledge Cove; 44°28′25″N 68°14′41″W	Hancock Point	Landing site of Erich Gimpel and William Colepaugh in late November 1944
82	Off-the-Neck Historic District		September 25, 1986 (#86002442)	State Route 166; 44°24′16″N 68°47′38″W	Castine	
83	Old Hancock County Buildings		November 23, 1977 (#77000161)	Court St. 44°32′20″N 68°25′46″W	Ellsworth	
84	Old Red Store		December 30, 2019 (#100004825)	129 Bernard Rd. 44°14′24″N 68°21′14″W	Tremont	
85	Frederick Law Olmsted Summer Home		November 7, 1976 (#76000089)	Southwest of Sunset on Deer Isle; 44°10′43″N 68°43′05″W	Sunset	
86	Parker House	Parker House	September 22, 2004 (#04001047)	185 South St. 44°23′49″N 68°35′19″W	Blue Hill	
87	Pentagoet Archeological District	Pentagoet Archeological District	April 12, 1993 (#93000603)	Perkins Street at Pentagoet Lane; 44°23′05″N 68°48′12″W	Castine	
88	John Perkins House	John Perkins House	December 30, 1969 (#69000019)	Perkins St. 44°23′02″N 68°48′22″W	Castine	
89	John Peters House		October 6, 1983 (#83003642)	Off State Route 176; 44°24′41″N 68°34′28″W	Blue Hill	
90	Pond Island Archeological District		January 28, 1979 (#79000133)	Pond Island; 44°17′36″N 68°48′29″W	Deer Isle	Island now owned as conservation land by Maine Coast Heritage Trust.
91	Peter Powers House		April 23, 1980 (#80000225)	State Route 15 and Sunshine Rd. 44°13′00″N 68°40′27″W	Deer Isle	
92	Prospect Harbor Light Station	Prospect Harbor Light Station	March 14, 1988 (#88000151)	Prospect Harbor Pt. 44°24′11″N 68°00′48″W	Prospect Harbor	
93	Jed Prouty Tavern and Inn	Jed Prouty Tavern and Inn	January 10, 1986 (#86000074)	52-54 Main St. 44°34′17″N 68°47′30″W	Bucksport	
94	Pumpkin Island Light Station	Pumpkin Island Light Station	February 1, 1988 (#87002537)	Pumpkin Island, Eggemoggin Reach; 44°18′33″N 68°44′36″W	Sargentville	
95	Raventhorp		January 7, 1988 (#87002195)	Greening Island; 44°16′58″N 68°18′12″W	Southwest Harbor	
96	Redwood		April 3, 1978 (#78000166)	Barberry Lane; 44°22′58″N 68°11′48″W	Bar Harbor	
97	Reverie Cove	Reverie Cove	February 19, 1982 (#82000743)	Harbor Lane; 44°23′25″N 68°12′56″W	Bar Harbor	
98	Robertson Quarry Galamander	Robertson Quarry Galamander	October 2, 1992 (#92001292)	Eastern side of State Route 182, northeast of its junction with Grist Mill Rd. 44°34′45″N 68°15′51″W	West Franklin	A galamander is a specialized wagon for hauling stone; this is one of only two known to survive in Maine.
99	Rural Hall		September 22, 2004 (#04001049)	Surry Rd., 1 mile (1.6 km) east of Contention Cove; 44°29′42″N 68°26′46″W	Surry	
100	St. Edward's Convent, (Former)	St. Edward's Convent, (Former)	October 8, 1998 (#98001237)	33 Ledgelawn Ave. 44°23′07″N 68°12′30″W	Bar Harbor	
101	Saint Jude's Episcopal Church	Saint Jude's Episcopal Church	July 24, 1986 (#86001905)	State Route 3; 44°17′38″N 68°14′48″W	Seal Harbor	
102	St. Mary's-By-The-Sea	St. Mary's-By-The-Sea	July 5, 2000 (#00000761)	20 S. Shore Rd. 44°17′19″N 68°17′09″W	Northeast Harbor	
103	Saint Saviour's Episcopal Church and Rectory	Saint Saviour's Episcopal Church and Rectory	June 20, 1995 (#95000729)	41 Mt. Desert St. 44°23′14″N 68°12′23″W	Bar Harbor	
104	Schoodic Peninsula Historic District		June 29, 2007 (#100001261)	1.5 miles (2.4 km) south of State Route 186; 44°22′30″N 68°03′50″W	Winter Harbor	
105	Sea Change		August 7, 2009 (#08000991)	27 Corning Way; 44°17′13″N 68°16′51″W	Northeast Harbor	
106	Seal Harbor Congregational Church		February 14, 1985 (#85000272)	State Route 3; 44°17′37″N 68°14′54″W	Seal Harbor	
107	Seawall Campground	Seawall Campground	June 29, 2007 (#07000613)	State Route 102A, Seawall Rd. 44°14′26″N 68°18′16″W	Southwest Harbor	
108	Sedgwick Historic District		January 20, 1995 (#94001550)	Junction of State Route 172 and Old County Rd. 44°18′58″N 68°36′35″W	Sedgwick	
109	Salome Sellers House		January 27, 1983 (#83004189)	South of Deer Isle on State Route 15A; 44°11′56″N 68°42′20″W	Deer Isle	Museum of the Deer Isle-Stonington Historical Society
110	Shore Acres		April 14, 2000 (#00000373)	791 Lamoine Beach Rd. 44°27′12″N 68°17′07″W	Lamoine Beach	
111	Eric E. Soderholtz Cottage		June 18, 1992 (#92000793)	Off the eastern side of State Route 186, 0.5 miles (0.80 km) south of U.S. Route 1; 44°27′51″N 68°05′39″W	West Gouldsboro	
112	Somesville Historic District	Somesville Historic District	January 8, 1975 (#75000092)	Somes Harbor and its environs 44°21′44″N 68°19′53″W	Mount Desert	
113	Sorrento Library		June 20, 1995 (#95000724)	Southern side of Waukeag Ave. 0.5 miles (0.80 km) west of its junction with State Route 185; 44°28′22″N 68°11′18″W	Sorrento	
114	Sound Schoolhouse		September 30, 2019 (#100004469)	373 Sound Drive; 44°21′35″N 68°18′16″W	Mount Desert	
115	Sproul's Cafe	Sproul's Cafe	February 4, 1982 (#82000744)	128 Main St. 44°23′20″N 68°12′14″W	Bar Harbor	
116	Stanwood Homestead		June 19, 1973 (#73000110)	295 High St. (State Route 3); 44°31′42″N 68°24′18″W	Ellsworth	Now Birdsacre Sanctuary
117	Stone Barn Farm	Stone Barn Farm	November 29, 2001 (#01001271)	Junction of Crooked Rd. and Norway Dr. 44°25′03″N 68°18′06″W	Salsbury Cove	
118	Stonington Opera House	Stonington Opera House	October 16, 1991 (#91001509)	Northwestern corner of Main St. and School St. 44°09′21″N 68°40′01″W	Stonington	
119	Surry Town Hall	Surry Town Hall	October 16, 2008 (#08000993)	1217 Surry Rd. 44°29′50″N 68°29′29″W	Surry	
120	Surry Village School		March 13, 2020 (#100005098)	7 Toddy Pond Rd. 44°29′39″N 68°30′27″W	Surry	
121	Topside		August 13, 1975 (#75000229)	Northern bank of Walker Pond off State Route 176; 44°20′38″N 68°41′39″W	Brooksville	
122	The Turrets		December 24, 1974 (#74000155)	Eden St. 44°23′41″N 68°13′13″W	Bar Harbor	
123	Union Church of Northeast Harbor		June 26, 1998 (#98000722)	21 Summit Rd. 44°17′40″N 68°17′29″W	Northeast Harbor	
124	U.S. Naval Radio Station- Apartment Building and Power House	U.S. Naval Radio Station- Apartment Building and Power House	July 3, 2013 (#13000533)	Schoodic Peninsula unit, Acadia National Park; 44°20′10″N 68°03′33″W	Winter Harbor vicinity	
125	US Post Office-Bar Harbor Main	US Post Office-Bar Harbor Main	May 2, 1986 (#86000880)	55 Cottage St. 44°23′23″N 68°12′26″W	Bar Harbor	
126	Von Mach Site (ME 151/02)		January 17, 1989 (#88000901)	Address Restricted	Brooksville	
127	West Brooksville Congregational Church	West Brooksville Congregational Church	June 20, 1995 (#95000727)	Eastern side of State Route 176, 1 mile (1.6 km) northwest of its junction with Varnum Rd. 44°23′42″N 68°45′28″W	West Brooksville	
128	West Gouldsboro Union Church	West Gouldsboro Union Church	June 14, 1990 (#90000926)	State Route 186 between Jones Cove and Jones Pond; 44°27′55″N 68°05′41″W	West Gouldsboro	
129	West Gouldsboro Village Library	West Gouldsboro Village Library	October 23, 1991 (#91001512)	Eastern side of State Route 186 between Jones Cove and Jones Pond; 44°27′56″N 68°05′41″W	West Gouldsboro	
130	West Street Historic District	West Street Historic District	May 6, 1980 (#80000226)	West St. between Billings Ave. and Eden St. 44°23′28″N 68°12′41″W	Bar Harbor	
131	E. B. White House		September 22, 1986 (#86002467)	State Route 175; 44°17′39″N 68°33′18″W	Brooklin	
132	Samuel Kidder Whiting House		July 14, 1983 (#83000453)	214 Main St; 44°32′34″N 68°25′15″W	Ellsworth	
133	Wilson Hall	Wilson Hall	April 27, 1983 (#83000452)	Franklin St. 44°34′31″N 68°47′51″W	Bucksport	
134	Wilson Museum	Wilson Museum	September 18, 2025 (#100012235)	44°23′02″N 68°48′22″W	Castine	
135	Winter Harbor Light Station	Winter Harbor Light Station	February 1, 1988 (#87002538)	Mark Island, Winter Harbor; 44°21′42″N 68°05′18″W	Winter Harbor	
136	Winter Harbor Schoolhouse	Winter Harbor Schoolhouse	March 21, 2025 (#100011555)	16 Hammond Lane; 44°23′35″N 68°05′16″W	Winter Harbor	

== Former listings ==
	Name on the Register	Image	Date listed	Date removed	Location	City or town	Description
1	Atlantic Schoolhouse		January 19, 1996 (#95001547)	April 27, 2010	Southern side of Town Rd. 44°10′16″N 68°25′17″W	Swan's Island	Destroyed in fire caused by lightning bolt in July 2008.
2	Waldo-Hancock Bridge	Waldo-Hancock Bridge	June 20, 1985 (#85001267)	December 18, 2013	U.S. Route 1; 44°33′37″N 68°48′08″W	Verona	Demolished in 2013. Extended into Waldo County
3	Wickyup	Wickyup	August 29, 1970 (#70000075)	March 5, 1986	vicinity of East Sullivan; 44°10′16″N 68°25′17″W	Sullivan	Summer estate of explorer Richard E. Byrd, destroyed by arsonist in 1984.

== See also ==
- List of National Historic Landmarks in Maine
- National Register of Historic Places listings in Maine
- National Register of Historic Places listings in Acadia National Park
