= Criterion Theatre (Bar Harbor, Maine) =

- U.S. National Register of Historic Places
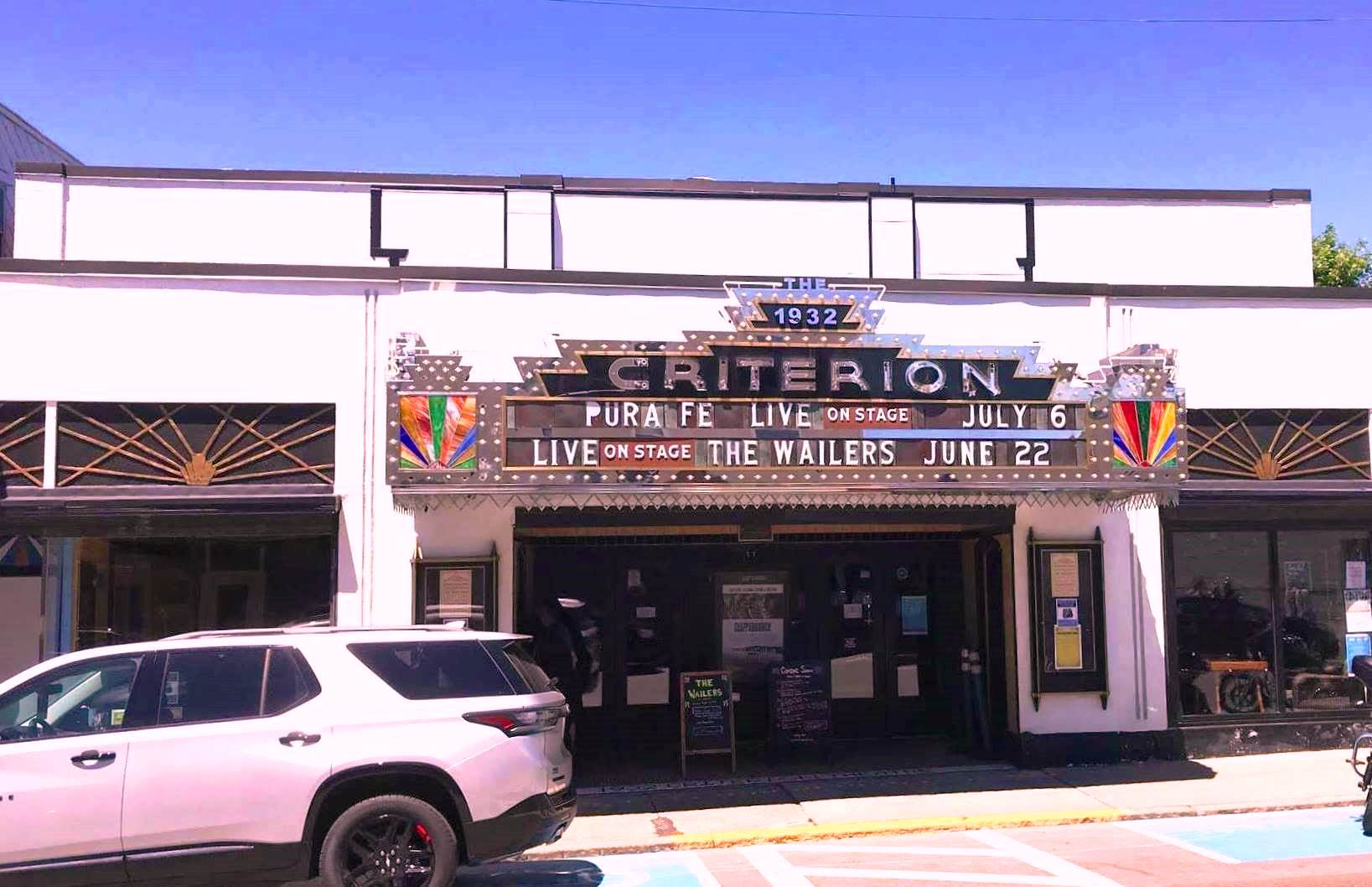
- Criterion Theatre, Bar Harbor, Maine

- Location within Maine Location within the United States
- Location: 35 Cottage St., Bar Harbor, Maine
- Coordinates: 44°23′24″N 68°12′23″W
- Area: 0.3 acres (0.12 ha)
- Built: 1932
- Architect: Bunker & Savage
- Architectural style: Art Deco
- NRHP reference No.: 80000222
- Added to NRHP: April 23, 1980

The Criterion Theatre is a historic performance space at 35 Cottage Street in downtown Bar Harbor, Maine. Built in 1932 when Bar Harbor's summer scene was at its height, it is one of only two Art Deco theaters in the state of Maine. The theatre has in recent years struggled for financial solvency but was purchased in 2014 by a nonprofit organization. After a major renovation, the theater reopened for business in May 2015. It was listed on the National Register of Historic Places in 1980.

== Architecture ==
The theater building occupies 85 feet (26 m) of frontage on Cottage Street, which houses the theater's entrance and two storefronts, and directly abuts the adjacent buildings. Its marquee is a typical Art Deco, projecting over the sidewalk in front of the recessed entry. The flanking storefronts originally also had Art Deco style elements, but these have been lost. The building is 154 feet (47 m) deep, with its front section one story in height, while the rear, housing the auditorium, is two stories. The lobby area of the theater opens to the full width of the building behind the stores. The capacity of the theater is 877 seats in the main floor and balcony. The Art Deco decoration of the interior was executed by D.H. Pickering of Boston, Massachusetts. Backstage spaces include six dressing rooms and equipment for mounting theatrical productions.

== History ==
The Criterion was built in 1932, at a time when Bar Harbor was at its height as a summer resort area catering to the very wealthy. It opened on June 6, 1932, featuring vaudeville performances and movies. During the height of prohibition, the basement of the Criterion was operated as a speakeasy, serving Canadian alcohol smuggled into the United States. Over the years the theater's fare was reduced to showing films during the summer. A succession of owners broadened its offerings to include live performances, but none were financially successful, and the building has since 2000 suffered from a lack of maintenance and problems with mold.

It was purchased in 2014 by a nonprofit organization for $1.2 million, with the goal of rehabilitating the structure. A major renovation was undertaken with the theater reopening in May 2015. The theater currently runs movies, live theater, and music performances year round.

Most recently the Criterion was taken over by the Harper Hoise Music Foundation after a forced closure in early 2025.

== See also ==
- National Register of Historic Places listings in Hancock County, Maine
