= Peter Powers House =

Historic house in Maine, United States

- U.S. National Register of Historic Places
- Location within Maine Location within the United States
- Location: ME 15 and Sunshine Rd., Deer Isle, Maine
- Coordinates: 44°13′0″N 68°40′27″W
- Area: 0.3 acres (0.12 ha)
- Built: 1785
- Architectural style: Cape Cod
- NRHP reference No.: 80000225
- Added to NRHP: April 23, 1980

The Peter Powers House is a historic house on Sunshine Road, just east of Maine State Route 15 in Deer Isle, Maine. This 1 1/2-story Cape style house was built in 1785 for Rev. Peter Powers, the first settled minister of the town, and is the oldest surviving house in the town. It is also architecturally distinctive as a rare regional example of a gambrel-roofed Cape. The house was listed on the National Register of Historic Places in 1980.

== Description and history ==
The Powers House is set on the south side of Sunshine Road, just east of its junction with Maine State Route 15 and about 0.5 miles (0.80 km) south of the central village of Deer Isle. The house is oriented facing south, away from the road and toward a cove that is connected to the island's Southeast Harbor. It is a 1 1/2-story wood-frame structure, three bays wide, with a central chimney, gambrel roof, clapboard siding, and a stone foundation. It has very plain exterior styling, with a center entrance flanked by sash windows. A second entry was added c. 1960 to the east side in a projecting single-story gambrel-roofed vestibule. The interior is simple but well-preserved, with two rooms on each floor, and original fireplaces.

The First Congregational Church of Deer Isle was organized in 1773, and in 1785 offered its first permanent ministerial position to Peter Powers of Newbury, Vermont. Powers was a prominent Harvard-educated minister who had helped found Dartmouth College in 1769, whose previous parish he had been at odds with over its political leanings toward the British during the recently ended American Revolutionary War. Powers served the community until his death in 1800. The house built for him 1785 is oldest intact house of the period in Deer Isle, and is rare in the state for its use of a gambrel roof, particularly on a Cape style house.

== See also ==
- National Register of Historic Places listings in Hancock County, Maine
