= Free Baptist Church of Great Pond =

Historic church in Maine, United States

- U.S. National Register of Historic Places
- Location within Maine Location within the United States
- Location: 1231 Great Pond Road, Great Pond, Maine
- Coordinates: 44°56′14″N 68°16′50″W
- Area: less than one acre
- NRHP reference No.: 12000892
- Added to NRHP: October 31, 2012

The Free Baptist Church of Great Pond is a historic church building at 1231 Great Pond Road in Great Pond, Maine, a tiny rural community in northern Hancock County. Built c. 1890-95, it is the only architecturally significant public or civic building constructed in the town, serving as a church until about 1938. It was listed on the National Register of Historic Places in 2012, and is undergoing restoration by a local nonprofit for use as a community center.

== Description and history ==
The Free Baptist Church is set on the east side of Great Pond Road, on the northern corner of its junction with Alligator Road. It is the centerpiece of the small community (population 43 in 2011), whose village center stretches for about 1 mile (1.6 km) along Great Pond Road. It is a single-story wood frame structure, with a front-gable roof, clapboard and flushboard siding, and a foundation made partially of cut granite and partially of rubblestone. A gable-roof vestibule projects from the front, with a two-stage tower rising above the vestibule and through the main block's eave. The belfry stages are finished in flushboarding, with decorative sawn brackets, and the tower is topped by a four-sided spire and metal ball. The main entrance, centered on the projecting vestibule, is sheltered by a bracketed hood with a gable pediment. The side walls are four bays wide.

The interior has been little altered since the building's construction c. 1890-95, lacking even basic modernizations such as electricity and plumbing. The floors are oak planking, the walls are plastered, and the ceiling consists of decorative pressed tin panels. Original pews were bent-arm railback benches.

The town of Great Pond was incorporated in 1981, having been settled (as Township 33) in 1810. The church was built in the 1890s after a fundraising campaign by the Ladies Circle of Township 33. The church membership was never particularly large, and documentary evidence shows that regular services had been discontinued by 1938. The building was thereafter maintained by members of the local Williams family (descendants of one of Great Pond's first settlers), in the belief that they owned it. When the building's deteriorating condition prompted discussions of its demolition, the nonprofit Friends of the Free Baptist Church of Great Pond was formed in 2004, and took title to the property in 2006. In 2010 the group won a grant to fund the restoration of the building as a community center. In 2013 preparations were made to move the building onto a new foundation.

== See also ==
- National Register of Historic Places listings in Hancock County, Maine
