= James Emery House =

Historic house in Maine, United States

- U.S. National Register of Historic Places
- Location within Maine Location within the United States
- Location: Main St., Bucksport, Maine
- Coordinates: 44°34′22″N 68°47′48.6″W
- Area: 1 acre (0.40 ha)
- Built: 1855
- Architectural style: Mid 19th Century Revival
- NRHP reference No.: 74000151
- Added to NRHP: August 13, 1974

The James Emery House, also known as Linwood Cottage, is a historic house on Main Street in Bucksport, Maine. An architecturally eclectic mix of Greek Revival, Gothic Revival, and Italianate styling, the house was built c. 1855 on a site overlooking the Penobscot River. It was listed on the National Register of Historic Places in 1974 for its architectural significance.

== Description ==
The Emery House is sited on a rise north of Main Street, on the western fringe of the town's central business district. It is a two-story wood-frame structure, with a cross-gable roof, clapboard siding, and a granite foundation. Its main facade is divided into three major sections. The leftmost section has a front-gable roof, with broad pilasters and a polygonal projecting bay on the first floor, topped by a balustrade, with a Gothic arched window in the gable above. The center section consists of a large square tower, its upper portion finished in diamond-cut shingles. Its corners are pilastered similarly to the left section, and the tower is topped by a turned balustrade. The right section of the house has a side-gable roof, with an engaged porch supported by Greek Revival columns. A tall dormer projects to the front, with a Gothic arched window. The house has two tall brick chimneys, each of which has a projecting course, and a crenellated top.

The house was built c. 1855 by James Emery, and it was, at the time of its listing in the National Register of Historic Places in 1974, still in the hands of his descendants. The only significant alteration to the exterior has been the removal of the uppermost stage of the tower. The building drew local notice when it was built, for its distinctive amalgamation of styles. Its designer is unknown.

== See also ==
- National Register of Historic Places listings in Hancock County, Maine
