= John Peters House =

Historic house in Maine, United States

- U.S. National Register of Historic Places
- Location within Maine Location within the United States
- Location: Off ME 176, Blue Hill, Maine
- Coordinates: 44°24′41″N 68°34′28″W
- Area: 1 acre (0.40 ha)
- Built: 1815
- Architectural style: Federal
- NRHP reference No.: 83003642
- Added to NRHP: October 6, 1983

The John Peters House is a historic house, and the centerpiece of the John Peters Estate on Peters Point in Blue Hill, Maine. Built in 1815 and enlarged c. 1900 and 1920, the property is historically significant for its association with John Peters, one of the first proprietors of Blue Hill, who arrived in the region in 1765, and was a prominent figure in local political and economic life for many years. His house was listed on the National Register of Historic Places in 1983; after serving for a time in the 20th century as an inn, it is now available for rent as an event venue.

== Description and history ==
The Peters House is set at the center of what is now called Peters Point, off Steamboat Wharf Road east of the main village of Blue Hill. The house is a 2 1/2-story structure, with a side gable roof. Its main block has brick walls on three sides, and wood frame sections to the northeast and southwest at the gables. The block has twin chimneys at the sides, and a five-bay facade with a front entry that has a simple Greek Revival surround with sidelight windows and pilasters. The front is sheltered by an oversized two-story portico supported by fluted columns, which was added c. 1900. A sunporch, built about the same time, was attached to the left side of the main block. To the rear of the main block and sunporch is a two-story wood-frame ell, from which a second brick ell extends further to the left.

John Peters, a native of Andover, Massachusetts, arrived in the Blue Hill area in 1765, and was one of its first proprietors, owning more than 1,600 acres (650 ha) of land in the area. He served as Blue Hill's town clerk and in other civic roles, and was a land surveyor and land agent for Philadelphia businessman William Bingham, who was the region's largest landowner around the turn of the 19th century. Peters also had other business interests, operating a local gristmill and shipyard, and served as a founding trustee of Blue Hill Academy. Peters had this house built in 1815, when he was 80 years old.

In the 20th century the property was adapted for use as an inn and resort. It is presently part of a 22-acre (8.9 ha) estate that is operated as a retreat and function space, with the house and a cottage available for rent, along with a barn that provides meeting space and catering facilities.

== See also ==
- National Register of Historic Places listings in Hancock County, Maine
