= The Farm House (Bar Harbor, Maine) =

Historic house in Maine, United States

- U.S. National Register of Historic Places
- U.S. Historic district
- Location within Maine Location within the United States
- Location: 15 Highbrook Rd., Bar Harbor, Maine
- Coordinates: 44°23′18″N 68°13′9″W
- Area: 4.2 acres (1.7 ha)
- Built: 1923
- Architect: Arthur McFarland; Beatrix Farrand
- Architectural style: Colonial Revival
- NRHP reference No.: 07001152
- Added to NRHP: November 7, 2007

The Farm House is a historic summer estate at 15 Highbrook Road in Bar Harbor, Maine. The estate includes a 19th-century farmhouse which was extensively altered in the 1920s to Colonial Revival designs by Arthur McFarland, who also designed a caretaker's cottage on the property. The property also includes a series of garden spaces designed by Beatrix Farrand. This work was done for Mildred McCormick, an heir to the fortune of Cyrus McCormick, inventor of the combine harvester. The estate was listed on the National Register of Historic Places in 2007.

== Description ==
The Farm House is a 4.2-acre (1.7 ha) estate, set on the southwest side of the main village of Bar Harbor, south of Eden Street between Highbrook Road and Prospect Avenue. The property is divided into "rooms", separate garden spaces, laid out roughly from northeast to southwest. The Eden Street room is the most northerly, bordered at the roads by a log rail fence and separated from the front yard by a stone wall; it is a roughly square grassy area populated with old apple and maple trees, as well as pine and locust trees. The front yard is dominated by a circular gravel drive with flowering shrubs and specimen trees in the center, and several Euonymus bushes at the northern edge. Wooden steps lead to a flagstone terrace in front of the house. The steps are flanked by arbor vitae, with rosa rugosa bushes below the terrace. A lawn on the west side of the house has a stone wall at its southern edge, defining this room's edge on that side, while a cedar hedge marks the boundary to the east of the house.

The back yard is a formal garden space designed by Beatrix Farrand. It is bounded by the house and its west wing, a row of Euonymus to the east, and a cedar hedge to the south. Paths of pea-stone gravel form a cross, one leading from the house to the Farrand garden room to the south. Their intersection is marked by four globe arbor vitae. The Farrand garden, also a formal space designed by Farrand, is enclosed by a cedar hedge. It is mostly lawn, with a pergola at the eastern end which is covered with climbing roses and grapes. A large terra cotta amphora is set on the west side, in a bed of thyme. South of this room is an undesigned vegetable garden and orchard, planted with apple trees, some of antiquity.

The main part of the house is a typical 19th-century Cape house, with ells on either side, and a wing extending south on from the western ell. The house is finished in clapboards and rests on a cut stone foundation. The interiors were substantially altered by Arthur McFarland's designs during the 1920s, although some early Federal and Greek Revival features have been retained. McFarland's Colonial Revival features include extensive use of wood paneling, as well as the use of chair rails, picture rails, and crown molding. The property also includes a caretaker's cottage, built in 1929 to a McFarland design, and a later, more modern garage.

The Farm House property was purchased in 1916 by Robert Hall McCormick for his wife, the former Sarah Lord Day of New York and given to his daughter Mildred in 1922. She commissioned Farrand and McFarland to transform what had been a farm property into a summer estate. The designs of Farrand for the landscape received favorable notice in 1934 from the Garden Club of America, and the estate as a whole is reflective of a trend in Bar Harbor for summer properties that were less expensive to maintain. The property is one of a modest number of summer estates to survive Bar Harbor's devastating 1947 fire.

== See also ==
- National Register of Historic Places listings in Hancock County, Maine
