= Squire Ignatius Haskell House =

Historic house in Maine, United States

- U.S. National Register of Historic Places
- Location within Maine Location within the United States
- Location: 20 Main Street, Deer Isle, Maine
- Coordinates: 44°13′26″N 68°40′49″W
- Area: 1 acre (0.40 ha)
- Built: 1793
- Architect: Haskell, Ignatius
- NRHP reference No.: 78000165
- Added to NRHP: February 3, 1978

The Squire Ignatius Haskell House is a historic house at 20 Main Street (Maine State Route 15A) in the center of Deer Isle, Maine. Now home to the Pilgrim's Inn, this wood-frame house was built in 1793 by one of the maritime community's leading men, and is one of its oldest buildings. It was listed on the National Register of Historic Places in 1978.

== Description and history ==
The Haskell House is set on the south side of Main Street in the village of Deer Isle, on a neck of land that separates Mill Pond from Northwest Harbor. The building is nominally 2 1/2 stories in height, but the sloping property exposes a full level of basement in the rear. It is a wood-frame structure, with a gambrel roof, clapboard siding, and a granite fieldstone foundation. The roof is pierced by shed-roof dormers on both the front and back, that on the front a long one with five windows. The main facade is five bays wide, with a wide center entrance that is slightly recessed. It is flanked by sidelight windows and Greek Revival pilasters, and topped by Doric entablature. A two-story wing extends to the right side of the main block, and a two-story shed-roof addition projects from the center of the rear facade, supported by posts at the basement level. The interior of the house, which follows a typical post-colonial center hall plan, has retained much of its original finish.

Ignatius Haskell was born in Newburyport, Massachusetts, and came to Deer Isle with his brother and father in 1778. They established a number of businesses, including a grist mill and shipyard, and Haskell was one of the town's leading citizens. He served on the board of selectmen, made substantial contributions toward the construction of a meeting house (no longer standing), and served in the state legislature. In 1791 he married the daughter of a wealthy Newburyport family, and built this house, of much greater sophistication than is typical for much of coastal Maine of the period, in 1793. The house remained in Haskell descendant hands until the 1940s, although it was converted by them for use as a summer tourist accommodation, the use it sees today.

== See also ==
- National Register of Historic Places listings in Hancock County, Maine
