= Ellsworth City Hall =

- U.S. National Register of Historic Places
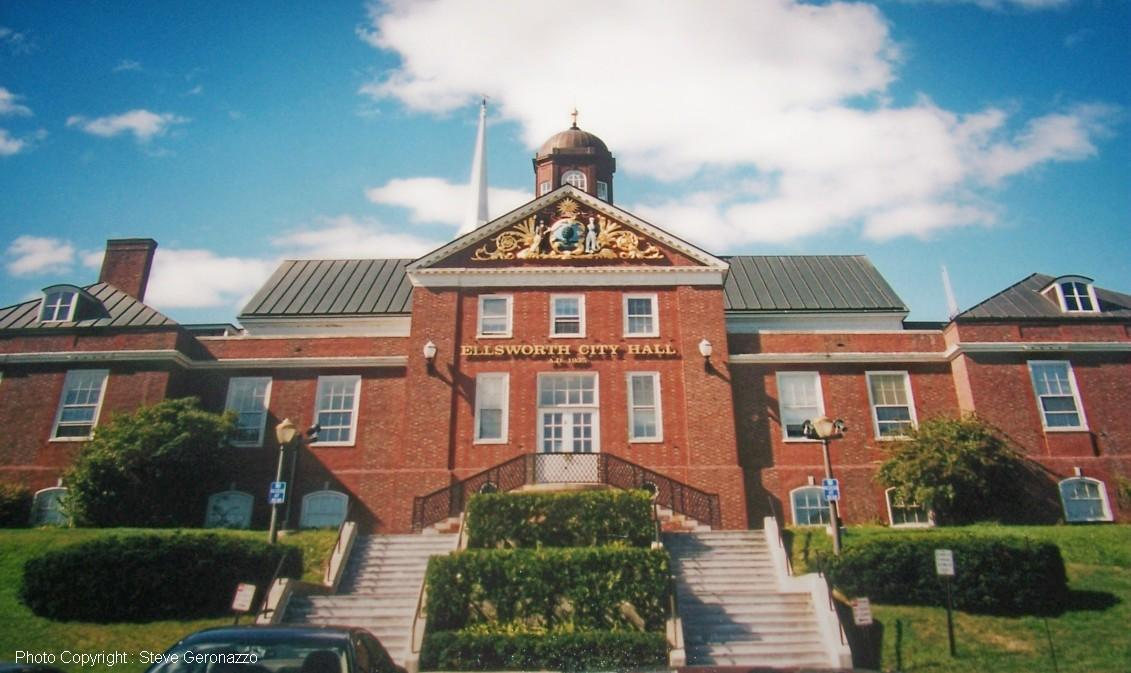
- City Hall in 2002

- Location within Maine Location within the United States
- Location: City Hall Plaza, Ellsworth, Maine
- Coordinates: 44.32330°N 68.25270°W
- Built: 1935
- Architect: Edmund Gilchrist
- NRHP reference No.: 86000073
- Added to NRHP: January 10, 1986

Ellsworth City Hall is the seat of local government in Ellsworth, Maine. Built in 1934-35 after a devastating fire destroyed the old city hall and part of the business district, it is a municipal building with Georgian Revival features unusual for Maine. The building was designed by Philadelphia architect Edmund Gilchrist, and is reflective of that area. The building was listed on the National Register of Historic Places in 1986.

== Description and history ==
Ellsworth City Hall stands on a hill north of United States Route 1, overlooking the city's central business district, separated from it by a parking lot. It is a two-story brick building, with a horizontal gable-roofed main block, which is flanked by hip-roofed perpendicular wings, and which has a center projecting gable-roof entry section. The flanking wings are joined to the main block by flat-roofed sections. The gable of the projecting center section is filled with carved painted woodwork, including a rendition of the city's seal. At the center of the main block an octagonal cupola rises to a round roof with spire.

The Ellsworth downtown area was devastated by a fire on May 7, 1933, whose casualties included the old city hall. The disastrous fire made it necessary to plan a complete new layout for the Civic Center. This plan included a new City Hall with Fire Station in one end of the basement; also a large parking space where an unsightly back area of stores existed. The estimated cost, which included the removal of about 12,000 cubic yards of dirt, was prohibitive at that time. This developed into an excellent project for manual labor when the Federal Civil Works Administration (CWA) was initiated in November, 1933. Work was carried on throughout the winter by the CWA and Maine Emergency Relief Administration (MERA). They completed the job in the fall of 1935. Work was given to an average of 65 men over an eight month period. An interesting feature of this work was that dirt removed was used on the High School Athletic Field nearby. The City Hall was completed under a Reconstruction Finance Corporation (RFC) loan. Edmund Gilchrist, a Philadelphia architect who summered on nearby Mount Desert Island, was chosen to design the new building, in which particular attention was paid to the use of fireproof materials. Gilchrist also made recommendations, ultimately not carried out, for a larger-scale redesign of the downtown area in the aftermath of the fire. The building's design features are more reflective of Gilchrist's experience with historic Georgian structures in Philadelphia than they are of rural Maine.

== See also ==
- National Register of Historic Places listings in Hancock County, Maine
