= East Blue Hill Post Office =

- U.S. National Register of Historic Places
- Location within Maine Location within the United States
- Location: 13 Curtis Cove Rd., East Blue Hill, Maine
- Coordinates: 44°25′1″N 68°31′20″W
- Area: 0.3 acres (0.12 ha)
- Built: 1884
- Built by: George F. Long
- Architectural style: Late Victorian, some Italianate detailing
- NRHP reference No.: 03000016
- Added to NRHP: February 12, 2003

The East Blue Hill Post Office is a small rural post office building at 13 Curtis Cove Road in East Blue Hill, Maine. Built by postmaster George Long in the 1880s or 1890s, it is a rare statewide example of a privately owned post office building, built without reference to United States Postal Service standards. Now owned by a local non-profit, it is still the community's post office. It was listed on the National Register of Historic Places in 2003.

== Description and history ==
The post office is a 1 1/2-story wood-frame building, located on the south side of Curtis Cove Road and facing north. The main facade is two bays wide, with a window to the left and the entrance to the right. A second, smaller window is in the gable end of the building's steeply pitched roof. The building has hints of Italianate styling in the bracketed hood sheltering the entrance, and in the carved rafter tails exposed in the gable end. There are two windows on the west side, none on the east, and two on the south side, along with an outside staircase which leads to the attic. The property also includes a second building that serves as a wood shed.

East Blue Hill is first recorded as having a post office in 1873. The present building is generally accepted as having been built by George Long, who became postmaster in 1891, although local lore also places its construction date (by Long) at 1884. The building belonged to members of the Long family, who also served as postmasters, until 1997, when it was sold to the East Blue Hill Village Improvement Association. It continues to serve as the community's post office.

The post office is distinct in the state as the only known example of a purpose-built post office facility that is not owned by the United States Postal Service, and that was not built or adapted to its standards. Of all of the post office buildings listed on the National Register of Historic Places in Maine, only one other (the Old Post Office in Liberty) is not an architect-designed purpose-built facility, but was a residence adapted for Postal Service use.

== See also ==
- National Register of Historic Places listings in Hancock County, Maine
- List of United States post offices
