= Church of Our Father =

Historic church in Maine, United States

- U.S. National Register of Historic Places
- Location within Maine Location within the United States
- Location: ME 3, 0.5 mi. No of Crooked Rd., Hulls Cove, Maine
- Coordinates: 44°25′15″N 68°15′2″W
- Area: less than one acre
- Built: 1890
- Architect: Camac, William Masters; Tiffany, Louis C.
- Architectural style: Gothic Revival
- NRHP reference No.: 99000770
- Added to NRHP: July 01, 1999

The Church of Our Father is a historic Episcopal church in Hulls Cove, a village of Bar Harbor, Maine. Built in 1890-91 to a design by William Masters Carmac, it is an excellent local interpretation of English Gothic Revival architecture executed in stone. It was part of a period trend in the construction of architect-designed summer chapels in coastal Maine. The building was listed on the National Register of Historic Places in 1999.

== Description and history ==
The Church of Our Father is a modest single-story stone structure, facing west on Maine State Route 3 in Hulls Cove, a village of Bar Harbor on the northeast side of Mount Desert Island. The main facade has a large lancet-arched stained glass window (created by the studios of Louis Comfort Tiffany) with an open bell cote at the top of the gable above. The wall is supported by buttressed corners. The main entrance is on the south side, sheltered by a projecting gable-roofed porch. The front and sides of the porch have arched openings, and there is a bullseye window in the gable end. The main roof is pierced by gabled dormers rising from the side walls. The interior of the church is finished in tongue-and-groove wainscoting, plaster walls, and plaster ceiling with exposed beams. To the north of the transept is a modern wood frame parish hall, giving the whole building an L shape.

The congregation of the Church of Our Father was founded in 1880. The church building was commissioned by Cornelia and Mary Prime, in honor of their parents, and was built in 1890-91 on land they donated. The building was designed by Philadelphia architect William Masters Carmac, a summer resident of Bar Harbor, and is the only known works in Maine of his (out of seven documented to be associated with his firm) to survive relatively intact. It is one of at least five architect-designed churches in coastal central Maine that was built in the late 19th century. It is also notable for its fine collection of stained glass windows, designed by a number of prominent glass studios and installed between 1898 and 1932.

== See also ==
- National Register of Historic Places listings in Hancock County, Maine
