= Cate House (Castine, Maine) =

Historic house in Maine, United States

- U.S. National Register of Historic Places
- U.S. Historic district – Contributing property
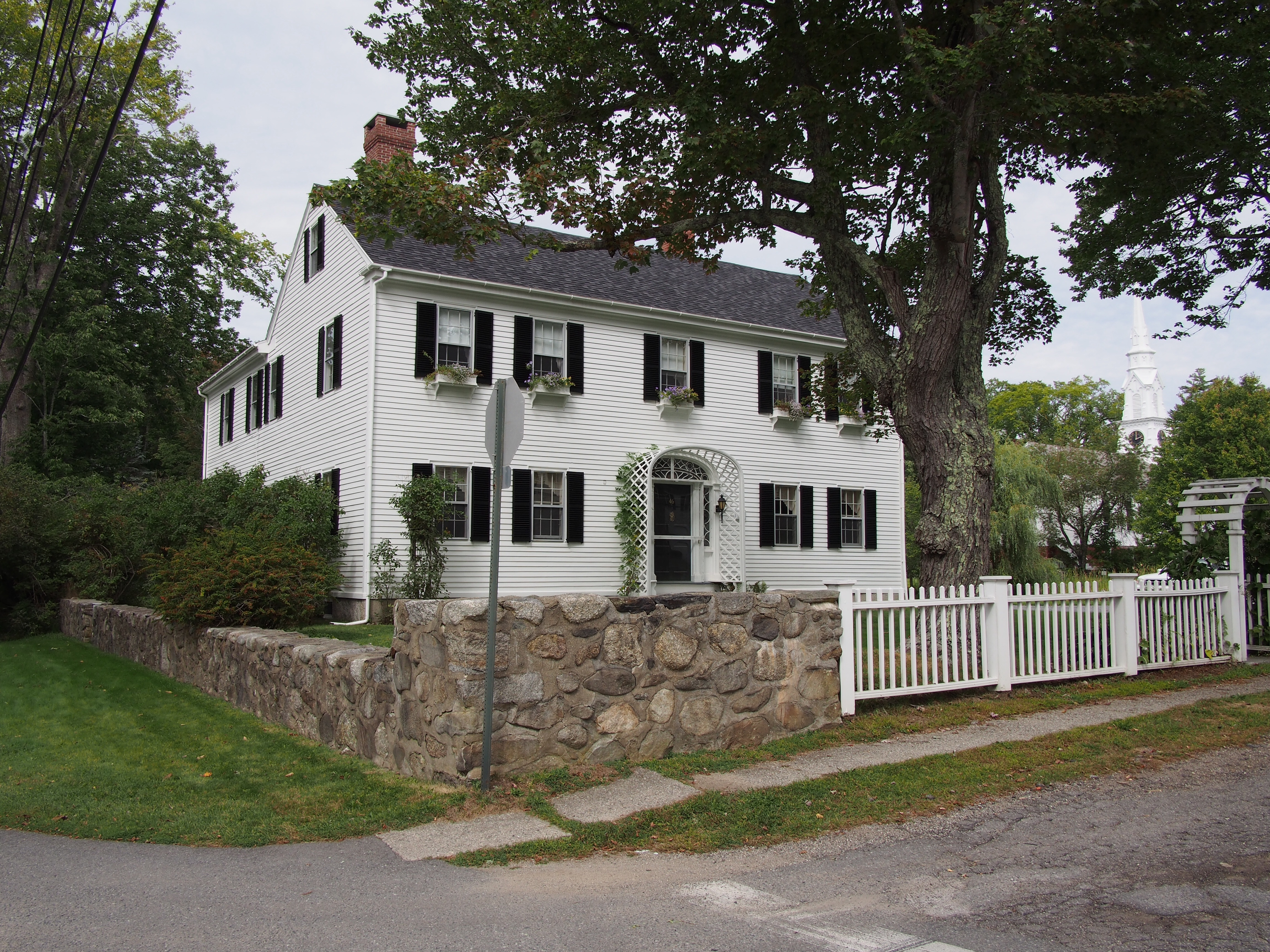

- Location within Maine Location within the United States
- Location: Corner of Court and Pleasant Streets, Castine, Maine
- Coordinates: 44°23′18″N 68°48′1″W
- Area: less than one acre
- Built: 1815
- Architectural style: Colonial
- Part of: Castine Historic District (ID73000240)
- NRHP reference No.: 70000040

Significant dates
- Added to NRHP: January 26, 1970
- Designated CP: February 23, 1973

The Cate or Adams House is a historic house at the northwest corner of Court and Pleasant streets in Castine, Maine. Built in 1815 during the height of the town's prosperity, it is a fine local example of a Federal period house. It was built for Thomas Adams, a local politician, and was for a time the residence of author Harriet Beecher Stowe. It was listed on the National Register of Historic Places in 1970.

== Description and history ==
The Cate House is a 2 1/2-story wood-frame structure, five bays wide, with a side-gable roof and twin interior chimneys. Its main entry centered on the main (east-facing) facade, has sidelight windows and a semi-elliptical fanlight window. A two-story ell extends to the rear. The interior has a central hall plan, with an elegant carved staircase and a unique curved door.

The house was built in 1815, during the height of Castine's prosperity as a maritime center after the War of 1812. The house was built for Thomas and Jane (Russell) Adams; he was a local selectman and served in the state legislature. Their daughter Jane married Charles Cate, and they were the house's next owners. Their daughter Anna married Sanford B. Dole, a leading figure in late-19th century Hawaiian politics. Harriet Beecher Stowe is known to have stayed here during a visit to Castine. At the time of the property's listing on the National Register in 1970, the house was owned by the Maine Maritime Academy, and served as housing for its executive officer.

== See also ==
- National Register of Historic Places listings in Hancock County, Maine
