= West Gouldsboro Union Church =

Historic church in Maine, United States

- U.S. National Register of Historic Places
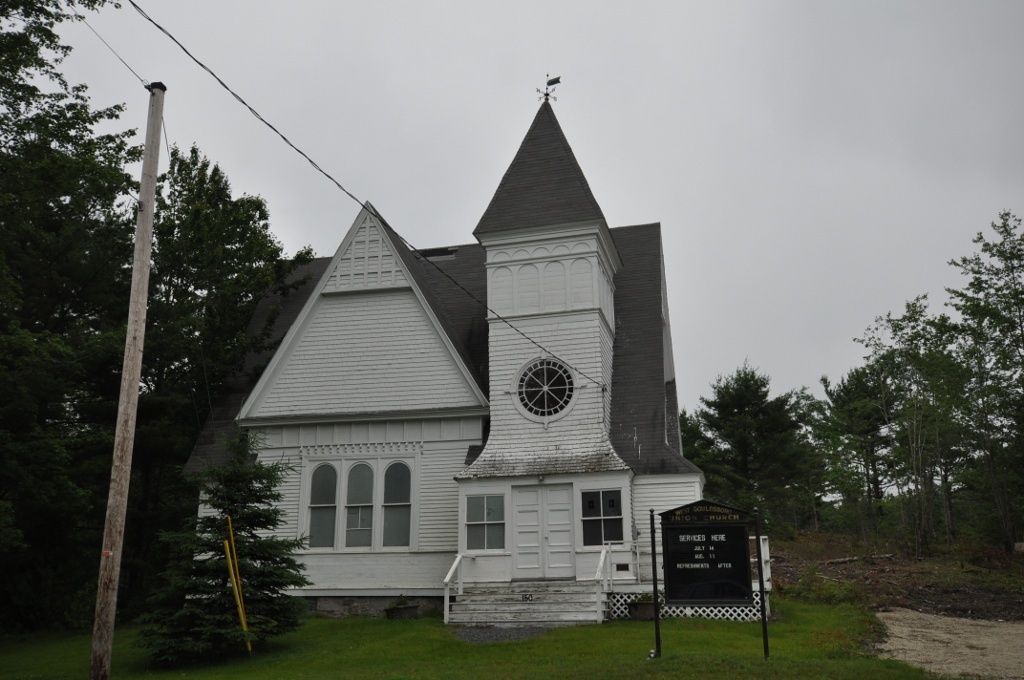

- Location within Maine Location within the United States
- Location: SR 186 between Jones Cove and Jones Pond, West Gouldsboro, Maine
- Coordinates: 44°27′55″N 68°5′41″W
- Area: less than one acre
- Built: 1888
- Architectural style: Queen Anne
- NRHP reference No.: 90000926
- Added to NRHP: June 14, 1990

West Gouldsboro Union Church is an historic church on Maine State Route 186 between Jones Cove and Jones Pond in West Gouldsboro, Maine. Built in 1888–1891, it is a distinctive and eclectic example of Queen Anne Victorian architecture. The building was listed on the National Register of Historic Places in 1990.

== Description and history ==
The West Gouldsboro Union Church is set on the east side of South Gouldsboro Road (SR 186), on a wide neck of land separating Jones Pond and Jones Cove, about 0.5 miles (0.80 km) south of United States Route 1. It is a roughly L-shaped wood-frame structure, with a steeply pitched gable roof over the nave, whose ridge is parallel to the street. Projecting to the front of this are a broad cross-gabled section, and an entrance vestibule topped by a square tower with pyramidal roof. Below the projecting gable section are three round-arch windows, with bands of paneled woodwork below the pedimented gable. The gable is finished in clapboard except for its peak area, which has applied Stick style woodwork. The tower section has a double door flanked by sash windows, with a flared section leading to the tower's first stage, which has a single rose window. Above this is an arcade of blind arches, above which a band of half rounds are set beneath the roof. The interior of the church has stained patterned narrow board sheathing on its walls.

The church was built between 1888 and 1891, as funding and community labor became available to work on it. Its architect is unknown. It is one of a relatively modest number of wood-frame churches built on the Maine coast in that time, as most of the churches built for summer resort areas were built out of stone and brick. Of churches known to date to this period, it is unusual for its layout and its interior decoration.

== See also ==
- National Register of Historic Places listings in Hancock County, Maine
