= U.S. Post Office-Bar Harbor Main =

- U.S. Post Office--Bar Harbor Main
- U.S. National Register of Historic Places
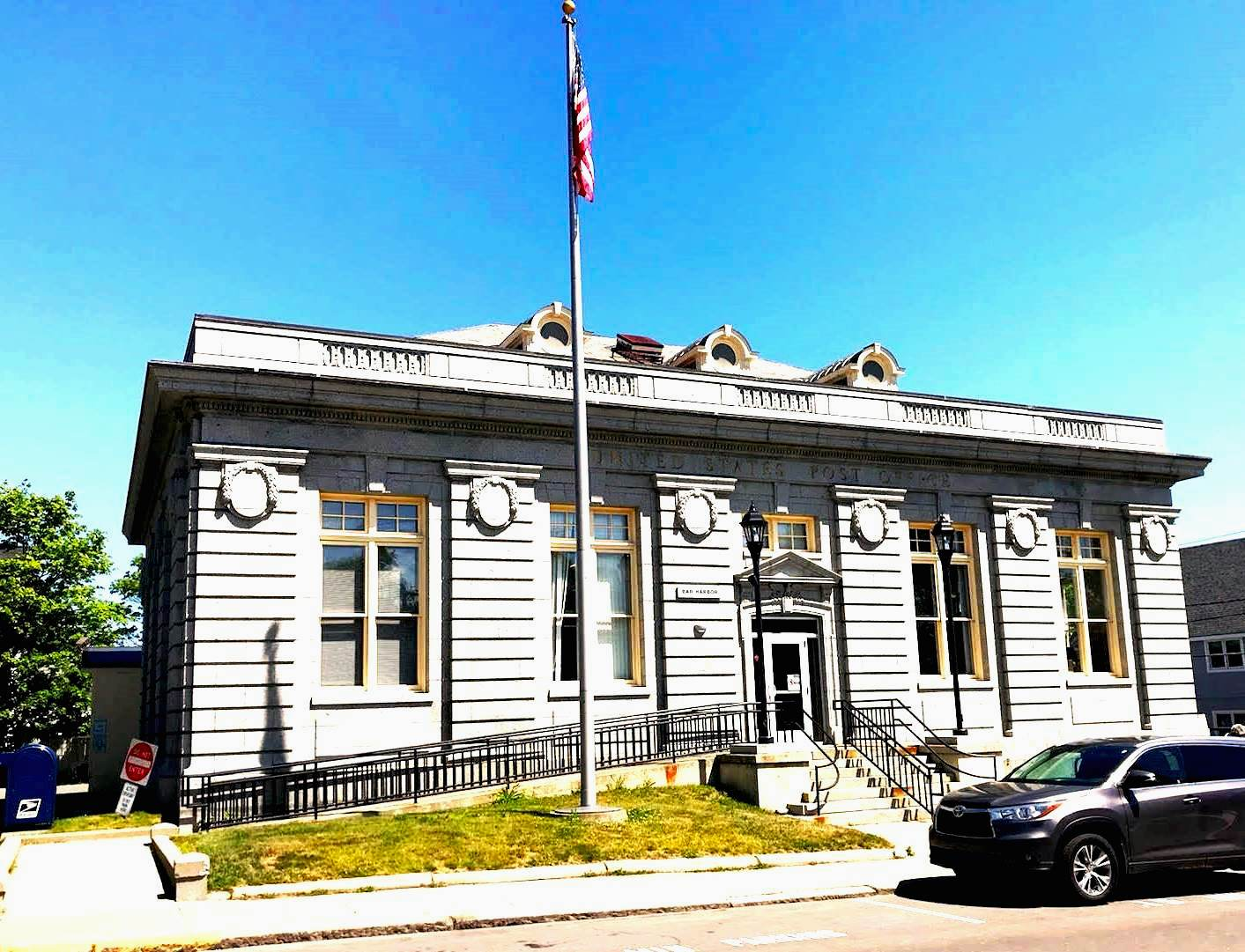
- Bar Harbor Maine post office

- Location within Maine Location within the United States
- Location: 55 Cottage St., Bar Harbor, Maine
- Coordinates: 44°23′23″N 68°12′26″W
- Area: 0.4 acres (0.16 ha)
- Built: 1908
- Architect: James Knox Taylor
- Architectural style: Classical Revival
- NRHP reference No.: 86000880
- Added to NRHP: May 2, 1986

The U.S. Post Office-Bar Harbor Main is a historic post office building at 55 Cottage Street in Bar Harbor, Maine. This handsome granite Classical Revival building was one of twelve post offices built in 1909, and is reflective of the government's trend at that time to use classical architecture as a way to express democratic ideals and institutions. The building was listed on the National Register of Historic Places in 1986.

== Description and history ==
The Bar Harbor Post Office stands on the north side of Cottage Street, just west of its junction with Federal Street and on the fringe of the main village's central business district. It is a substantial single-story structure, built out of Maine granite. Its main facade faces south, and is five bays wide, with banded pilasters, topped by medallions, separating the bays. The outer four bays have paired sash windows topped by keystones. The main entrance is in the central bay, surrounded by a stonework arch and topped by a triangular pediment. The building has a strong cornice line, topped by a parapet. Behind the parapet is a low-pitch hip roof pierced by three vaulted-arch dormers. The building's public lobby space is richly decorated with terrazzo marble flooring, marble wainscoting, and heavy woodwork surrounds for the interior doors and service windows. The ceiling has ornamental plaster decoration.

Bar Harbor's post office was designed in 1908 by James Knox Taylor, the supervising architect of the United States Department of the Treasury, and was completed in 1909. Its construction was authorized by Tarsney Act and the Omnibus Building Act of 1902, and its individualized design was reflective of the government's return to the use of Classical styling as an expression of democratic ideals and institutions. The building is located in an area that was hard hit by Bar Harbor's devastating 1947 fire.

== See also ==
- National Register of Historic Places listings in Hancock County, Maine
- List of United States post offices
