= Edward J. Hammond Hall =

- U.S. National Register of Historic Places
- Location within Maine Location within the United States
- Location: Main St., Winter Harbor, Maine
- Coordinates: 44°23′28″N 68°5′23″W
- Area: less than one acre
- Built: 1903
- Built by: Charles E. Grover
- Architectural style: Colonial Revival
- NRHP reference No.: 03001405
- Added to NRHP: January 14, 2004

Edward J. Hammond Hall is a historic mixed-use civic building on Main Street in Winter Harbor, Maine. The architecturally sophisticated hall was built in 1903 to house town offices and a performing arts spaces, and was built with a major donation from local son Edward J. Hammond. The building served as town hall until 1958, and is still used for performances by the Schoodic Arts for All organization. The building was listed on the National Register of Historic Places in 2004.

== Description and history ==
Hammond Hall is set on the south side of Main Street, on the west side of the village center of Winter Harbor. It is a 1 1/2-story wood-frame structure, with a front-gable roof, wood shingle siding, and a raised stone foundation. The building's front corners feature doubled pilasters, and the eaves are studded with doubled brackets. A flat-roof porch extends from the north-facing front facade, supported by paired square columns and paired pilasters, with a balustrade on top. A Palladian window is located just above the entrance. The entry leads into a large vestibule finished in horizontal tongue-and-groove paneling, with a small ticket window to the east, and a broad staircase leading to the second floor on the same side. The auditorium space is finished with plaster above tongue-and-groove wainscoting, and the edge of the balcony is finished in similar paneling. The auditorium space has wooden flooring, and does not have permanently installed seating.

Construction of the hall was proposed in 1902 by Edward J. Hammond, owner of a local lumber business, after a fire swept through Winter Harbor village. Hammond donated land and materials, and the town paid for the building to be erected, which was completed the following year. The hall house town offices on the second floor (space now used for storage and meetings), and the hall was used for live performances, social events, and eventually movies as well. The town offices moved out of the building in 1958, and the main hall continued to be used as a school gymnasium until 1987. The town then sold the building to the Winter Harbor Historical Society.

A scarcity of funding resulted in the building's decline, and it was slated for demolition in 2002. It was rescued by the Schoodic Arts For All, a cultural organization that brings a variety of events to the space, which now holds a long-term lease on the property.

== See also ==
- National Register of Historic Places listings in Hancock County, Maine
