= Sorrento Library =

- U.S. National Register of Historic Places
- Location within Maine Location within the United States
- Location: Waukeag Ave. S side, 0.5 mi. W of jct. with ME 185, Sorrento, Maine
- Coordinates: 44°28′22″N 68°11′18″W
- Area: less than one acre
- Built: 1892
- Architect: Ball & Dabney
- Architectural style: Colonial Revival
- NRHP reference No.: 95000724
- Added to NRHP: June 20, 1995

The Sorrento Library is located on Waukeag Avenue in the summer resort town of Sorrento, Maine. It is located in an architecturally distinguished Colonial Revival building, designed by Ball and Dabney and built in 1892–93, that also functions as a community meeting space. The building was listed on the National Register of Historic Places in 1995.

== Architecture and history ==
The Sorrento Library is set on the south side of Waukeag Avenue, about 0.5 miles (0.80 km) west of its junction with Maine State Route 185. It is a 1 1/2-story wood-frame structure, with a hip roof, wood shingle exterior, and a granite foundation. The north-facing main facade is distinguished by a porte-cochere sheltering its entrance, and an arcaded porch that extends across the width and around the sides. The roof above is pierced by three gabled dormers, the center one large and containing three wide sash windows, the central one topped by a half-round window. Inside, the main floor is divided into two large spaces, separated by a large stone fireplace. The first space encountered from the entrance is the larger, and has a gallery above which is accessed by stairs near the entrance. The space to the rear, originally a reading room, has been converted into an apartment.

The development of Sorrento was begun as a speculative venture in the 1880s by businessmen seeking to capitalize on the popularity of the area as evidenced by the success of nearby Bar Harbor. A hotel and a number of elegant summer "cottages" were built by the early 1890s, and rail and steamship service to the area was arranged by Frank Jones, president of the Boston and Maine Railroad and one of the venture's major investors. Jones was also probably responsible for the separation of Sorrento from adjacent Sullivan in 1895. His wife donated the funds for construction of the library, which was designed by the Boston firm of Ball and Dabney and completed in 1893. The library, although open to the public, remained the property of the Joneses until 1918, when it was turned over to the Sorrento Village Improvement Association, which has managed the building since. The interior of its main hall was altered in the 1930s by the removal of posts to increase the amount of space available for dances.

== See also ==
- National Register of Historic Places listings in Hancock County, Maine
