= Eric E. Soderholtz Cottage =

Historic house in Maine, United States

- U.S. National Register of Historic Places
- Location within Maine Location within the United States
- Location: Off W side of WA 186, .5 mi. S of US 1, West Gouldsboro, Maine
- Coordinates: 44°27′52″N 68°5′39″W
- Area: 2.6 acres (1.1 ha)
- Built: 1902
- Architect: Eric Ellis Soderholtz
- Architectural style: Bungalow/craftsman
- NRHP reference No.: 92000793
- Added to NRHP: June 18, 1992

The Eric E. Soderholtz Cottage is a historic house on Maine State Route 186 in West Gouldsboro, Maine. Built in 1902, it is a fine local example of rustic Craftsman architecture. It was built by Eric Ellis Soderholtz, an artist noted around the turn of the 20th century for his architectural photography and his Arts and Crafts pottery. The house was listed on the National Register of Historic Places in 1992.

== Description and history ==
The Solderholtz Cottage is set on the east side of South Gouldsboro Road (Maine State Route 186), about 0.5 miles (0.80 km) south of its junction with United States Route 1, on a neck of land separating freshwater Jones Pond from Jones Cove, an inlet of Frenchman Bay. It occupies a high point on 2.6 acres (1.1 ha), which is approached by a curving private lane from the north. It is a rambling single-story building, fashioned out of wood and fieldstone, which approximates a Greek cross in shape. It has a hip roof with flared eaves and exposed rafter ends in the Craftsman style. A concrete patio extends along the southern and western sides, lined on the west by a low stone wall. A breezeway on the south side joins the main structure to a two-room wood-frame structure, which is believed to have served as a studio space. The house interior also has numerous Craftsman features, including exposed rafter beams and tilework by the Grueby Faience Company of Boston. The initial portion of the house was the subject of an article in the July 1903 edition of Country Living in America.

Construction of the cottage began in 1902, after Eric Ellis Soderholtz (1867-1959) purchased two parcels of land, providing a high point in the area and access to Frenchman Bay. Originally an L-shaped structure, it was gradually expanded during Soderholtz' lifetime to achieve its present form. Soderholtz, who immigrated from Sweden as a child, achieved a reputation in the late 19th century as a photographer of architecture and landscape, with his work appearing in journals and monographs of the period. In the 20th century he achieved further notice as a creator of concrete garden sculptures, which he created by hand-turning them (the way clay pots are made by hand) rather than using molds. His work was marketed and sold into the exclusive summer colonies of Mount Desert Island, and as far off as Newport, Rhode Island.

== See also ==
- National Register of Historic Places listings in Hancock County, Maine
