= Hancock Point School =

Former school in Maine, United States

- U.S. National Register of Historic Places
- Location within Maine Location within the United States
- Location: 644 Point Road, Hancock, Maine
- Coordinates: 44°29′15″N 68°14′55″W
- Area: less than one acre
- Built: 1870
- Built by: Young, George R.
- Architectural style: Late Victorian
- NRHP reference No.: 13000187
- Added to NRHP: April 23, 2013

The Hancock Point School is a historic former school building at 644 Point Road in Hancock, Maine. Built c. 1870, this wood frame one-room schoolhouse served as a school until 1940, and is now privately owned. It is the town's only surviving district schoolhouse, and was listed on the National Register of Historic Places in 2013.

== Description and history ==
The schoolhouse is a single-story wood-frame structure, with a front gable roof, weatherboard siding, minimal exterior ornamentation, and a foundation of stone piers. It is set on a large (more than 5-acre (2.0 ha)) parcel of land on the east side of Point Road, which also includes a c. 1980s private residence. Its main facade has a centered doorway with a transom window, and an opening for a small sash window in the gable above. The side elevations have two pairs each of sash windows, and the rear elevation has a window in the gable, and a doorway leading into an attached shed-roof garage. The main entrance opens into a small vestibule area, which has doors to either side leading into the classroom space. That space has vertical beadboard wainscoting, with horizontal beadboard paneling above and on the ceiling. The floors are maple, a replacement for original pine floors. The space includes original fixtures, including desks, benches, and electric lighting dating to 1937.

The town of Hancock had eight school districts. This building, which served district #2, was built c. 1870 by George Young, who also gave half of the land on which it stands. The school remained in service until 1941, when the town completed the consolidation of all of its district schools based on a state mandate.

== See also ==
- National Register of Historic Places listings in Hancock County, Maine
