= Phineas Heywood House =

Historic house in Maine, United States

- U.S. National Register of Historic Places
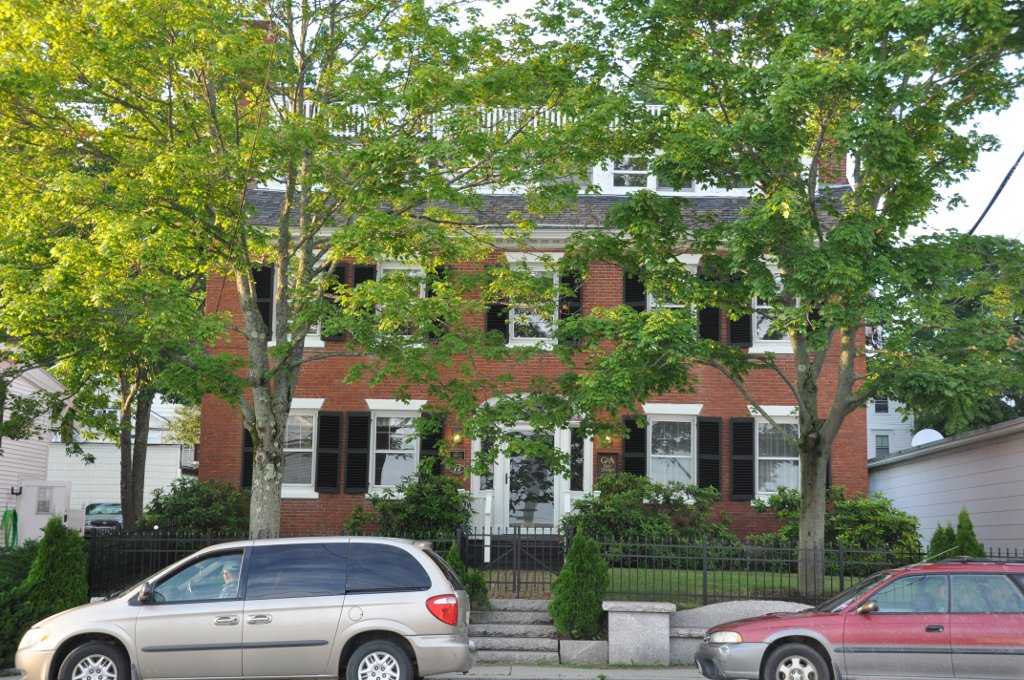

- Location within Maine Location within the United States
- Location: 343 Maine St., Bucksport, Maine
- Coordinates: 44°34′19″N 68°47′42″W
- Area: less than one acre
- Built: 1824
- Architectural style: Federal
- NRHP reference No.: 87002194
- Added to NRHP: January 7, 1988

The Phineas Heywood House is a historic house at 343 Maine Street in the center of Bucksport, Maine. Built c. 1824, it is one of the finest Federal style brick houses in the region, and was probably the first brick building erected in Bucksport and its surrounding towns. It was listed on the National Register of Historic Places in 1988.

== Description and history ==
The Heywood House is set facing south on the north side of Maine Street, overlooking the Penobscot River. It is a 2 1/2-story brick structure, with a side gable roof, four end chimneys, and a dressed granite foundation. The main facade is five bays wide, its windows featuring splayed sills and lintels. The main entrance is flanked by sidelight windows and topped by fanlight window. Both sides of the roof feature a monitor-style dormer. A wood-frame addition extends to the rear of the main block. The main block's brick is laid in Flemish bond on the front, and English bond on the sides. The front facade's brick is of uniformly high quality.

The construction date of the house was given in an early history of Bucksport as 1824, an approximate date supported by its construction style. It was built by a local harness-maker, and remained in the Heywood family until the mid-20th century. The house is the finest Federal style brick house in the lower Penobscot River valley, exceeding in decoration examples in Bangor, Castine, and another house in Bucksport.

== See also ==
- National Register of Historic Places listings in Hancock County, Maine
