= Sproul's Cafe =

- U.S. National Register of Historic Places
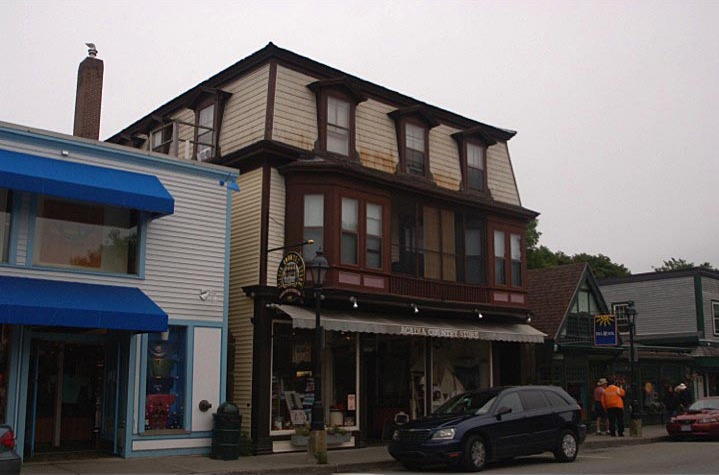
- The building in 2013

- Location within Maine Location within the United States
- Location: 128 Main St., Bar Harbor, Maine
- Coordinates: 44°23′20″N 68°12′14″W
- Area: 0.3 acres (0.12 ha)
- Built: 1880
- Architect: Hamor, Elihu T.
- Architectural style: Second Empire
- NRHP reference No.: 82000744
- Added to NRHP: February 4, 1982

The Sproul's Cafe building is a historic commercial building at 128 Main Street in Bar Harbor, Maine. The 2-1/2 story Second Empire building was built in 1880, and was home until 1903 of a nationally recognized gathering place for Bar Harbor's summer residents. The building is a rare local commercial survivor of Bar Harbor's heyday as a summer resort community. It was listed on the National Register of Historic Places in 1982. Its present retail tenant is a tourist-oriented shop.

== Description and history ==
Sproul's Cafe is set on the east side of Main Street in Bar Harbor's busy downtown area. It is a 2-1/2 story wood frame structure with a Mansard roof (the steep part now clapboarded), clapboard siding, and a granite foundation. The west-facing ground floor has a recessed center entrance, flanked by plate glass windows, which also line the recess. The second floor has a pair of projecting bay windows, between which a screened porch with balustrade has been added. The half-story under the Mansard roof has three gable-roofed dormers with sash windows.

Sproul's Cafe opened for business at a different location in Bar Harbor in 1870, operated by Mr. and Mrs. Robert Sproul. The success of the operation prompted the construction of this larger facility in 1880. The Sprouls acquired a national reputation for the quality of the dining and catering they provided to the wealthy upper crust that summered at Bar Harbor, and for serving wine in contravention to Maine's strict alcohol laws. The Sprouls sold the property in 1903, and it was converted into a department store.

== See also ==
- National Register of Historic Places listings in Hancock County, Maine
