= Surry Town Hall =

Historic church in Maine, United States

- U.S. National Register of Historic Places
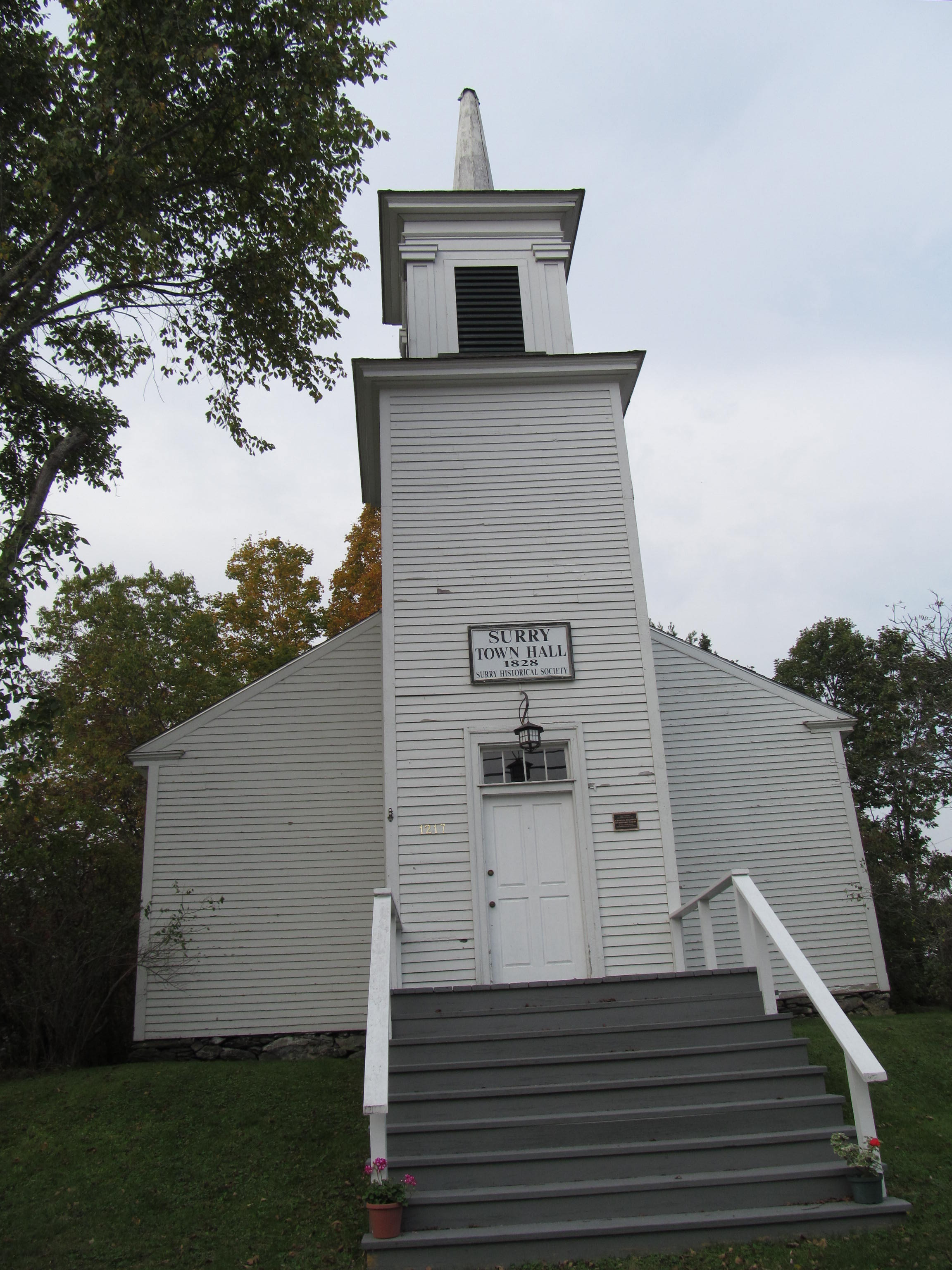

- Location within Maine Location within the United States
- Location: 1217 Surry Rd., Surry, Maine
- Coordinates: 44°29′46″N 68°29′51″W
- Area: 0.2 acres (0.081 ha)
- Built: 1844
- Architect: Woodward, Stephen C.
- Architectural style: Early Republic, Greek Revival
- NRHP reference No.: 08000993
- Added to NRHP: October 16, 2008

The former Surry Town Hall is located at 1217 Surry Road (Maine State Route 172) in the village of Surry, Maine. Built in East Surry in 1848, it served as town hall until 1844, and as a combined church and town hall until about 1881. It was then returned to exclusive municipal use until 1978; it is now home to the Surry Historical Society. It was listed on the National Register of Historic Places in 2008. The town's municipal offices are located in a modern facility on North Bend Road; town meetings are now held in the local school auditorium.

== Description and history ==
The former Surry Town Hall is set at the northwest corner of Surry Road and Meadow Lane, in the rural village of Surry. It is a single-story rectangular wood-frame structure, with a tower projecting from the front facade. It has a front-gable roof, clapboard siding, and a granite foundation. The front facade has no windows, and the entrance is at the base of the tower, topped by a transom window and framed by simple molded trim. The tower is without adornment until it rises above the ridge line of the main block, at which point a roof line separates the tower base from the square belfry. The belfry is more highly decorated, with wide corner pilasters and a simple entablature framing rectangular louvered openings. A small steeple rises above the belfry. A small shed-roof addition extends to the north (rear) of the building. The interior consists of a small vestibule in the tower, a large open space with a barrel roof, and a storage space in the rear addition.

The town hall was built by the town in 1828 in what is now East Surry to house municipal meetings and voting facilities. At the time it was near the geographic center of the town, but after much of eastern Surry was transferred to neighboring Ellsworth in 1829, it was at the far eastern edge of the town. In 1844 the town sold the building to the Surry Union Meeting Society, reserving the right to use the building for town meetings. The society moved the building to its present location, and added the tower and other Greek Revival features. The building was then used by the town as well as local congregations of Methodists and Baptists. The Baptists built their own church in 1866, and the Methodists soon followed; by 1881 the building was recorded on maps as the "town house" again. The building continued to be used by the town for meetings and voting until 1978, and was leased to the Surry Historical Society in 1980.

== See also ==
- National Register of Historic Places listings in Hancock County, Maine
