= Barncastle =

Historic house in Maine, United States

- U.S. National Register of Historic Places
- Barncastle in October 2026

- Location within Maine Location within the United States
- Location: South St. Blue Hill, Maine
- Coordinates: 44°23′51″N 68°35′18″W
- Built: 1884
- Architect: George Clough
- Architectural style: Shingle Style
- NRHP reference No.: 80000219
- Added to NRHP: November 10, 1980

"Barncastle", also known as Kline Cottage, is a historic house, now an inn and restaurant, at 125 South Street in Blue Hill, Maine, United States. It is one of the earliest and largest summer cottages in Blue Hill, and remains one of its most visible and idiosyncratic. Listed on the National Register of Historic Places and originally called "Ideal Lodge" after the Boston Ideal Opera Company founded by its builder, Effie Hinckley Ober, the house was finished in 1884 to a design by George Asa Clough, Blue Hill native and noted Boston architect, Effie's childhood friend.

Carriage house and carriage way

Entirely engulfing a smaller Cape Cod-style house owned by Effie's mother Mary Peters Hinckley Ober Atherton, a descendant of early Blue Hill settlers, Clough's design derived from notable buildings of his more famous contemporaries: the massing of the main block was based on a cottage by W.R. Emerson, and the landmark arch-and-turret link between kitchen wing and carriage barn strongly recalls familiar works by McKim, Mead and White at Narragansett Pier and Mamaroneck. The building has some idiosyncratic elements, including its central staircase, which rises in stages to an area featuring an interior window and balcony, and a modest bellcast-topped turret that rises from its main facade.

Now housing an inn and restaurant, Barncastle was listed on the National Register in 1980.

== See also ==
- National Register of Historic Places listings in Hancock County, Maine
