= Blue Hill Historic District =

Historic district in Maine, United States

- U.S. National Register of Historic Places
- U.S. Historic district
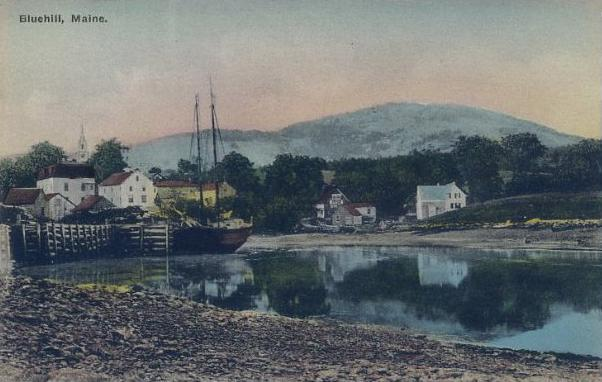
- c. 1920 postcard view of Blue Hill

- Location within Maine Location within the United States
- Location: ME 15, ME 172, ME 176, and ME 177, Blue Hill, Maine
- Area: 80 acres (32 ha)
- Built: 1796
- Architect: Multiple
- Architectural style: Greek Revival, Federal
- NRHP reference No.: 80000220
- Added to NRHP: December 8, 1980

The Blue Hill Historic District encompasses the historic village center of the town of Blue Hill, Maine. The village, established in 1762, is a well-preserved collection of buildings, many of them built before 1840. Most of the older buildings are residential in character; the modest collection of commercial and civic buildings were mostly built between 1880 and 1940. The district was listed on the National Register of Historic Places in 1980.

== Description and history ==
The village of Blue Hill is located on the east coast of the Blue Hill Peninsula, at the head of Blue Hill Harbor, where two streams empty into the bay. Main Street runs roughly east–west, forming the spine of the village, with Union Street, Pleasant Street, Parker Point Road, and Ellsworth Street radiating away. The district includings properties on Main Street from west of High Street as far east as Ellsworth Street, along Union Street northwest to the area of the 1794 cemetery, and along Bucksport Road to High Street. There are more than 70 historically significant buildings in an area covering 80 acres (32 ha).

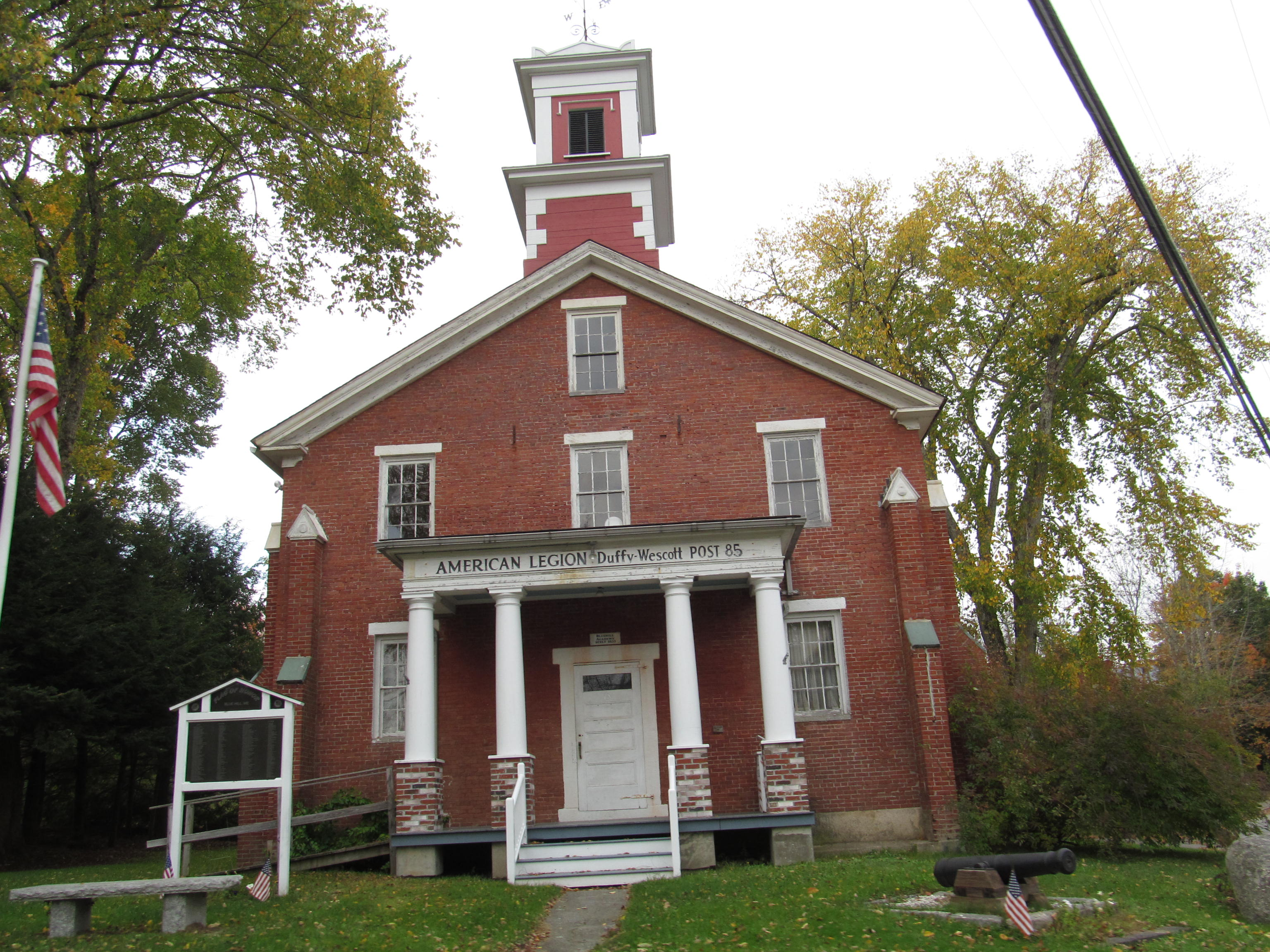
The former Academy building

Although the village was settled in 1762, its oldest surviving element is the 1794 cemetery. The oldest buildings, dating to c. 1800, including the Daniel Spofford House and the Congregational Church Parsonage, the latter associated with the 1834 Greek Revival Congregational Church. The American Legion Hall was built in 1833 as the home to the Blue Hill Academy, which was founded in 1803 as the first school in Hancock County. The academy was later succeeded by the extant George Stevens Academy, whose main building, an 1898 Colonial Revival structure, stands in the district. George Stevens' 1814 Federal style house also still stands on Union Street.

Commercial and civic architecture are predominantly either Second Empire or Colonial Revival in character. Prominent examples of these are the 1880 Merrill & Hinkley Store, a three-story mansard-roofed commercial building built in 1880, and the 1896 Odd Fellows Hall, of similar construction. Blue Hill's Colonial Revival town hall was designed by Maine architect George A. Clough and built in 1895, and its library, also Colonial Revival, was built in 1938.

== See also ==
- National Register of Historic Places listings in Hancock County, Maine
