= Seal Harbor Congregational Church =

Historic church in Maine, United States

- U.S. National Register of Historic Places
- Location within Maine Location within the United States
- Location: ME 3, Seal Harbor, Maine
- Coordinates: 44°17′37″N 68°14′54″W
- Area: 0.3 acres (0.12 ha)
- Built: 1902
- NRHP reference No.: 85000272
- Added to NRHP: February 14, 1985

The former Seal Harbor Congregational Church is a historic church building on Peabody Drive (Maine State Route 3) in Seal Harbor, Maine. It was built in 1902, and is an elegant expression of the Shingle style in a seasonal church building. It was listed on the National Register of Historic Places in 1985 and is now a private residence. The Congregation that formerly worshipped in this space is now known as Seaside UCC and fluctuates worship between the Abby Chapel in Seal Harbor and the Union Church of Northeast Harbor & neighboring Wadsworth Park. The Pastor, since 2016, is the Rev. Dr. Joseph F. Cistone.

== Description and history ==
The former Seal Harbor Congregational Church is set on the southwest corner of Peabody Drive and Dodge Point Road. The two-story stone and wood building is set facing northeast, toward the junction. It has a gabled roof that descends to the top of the first floor, with large brackets at the sides. The high foundation is of squared quarry-faced stone, and the main floors are finished in wooden shingles, with a belt course separating the floors. The entrance, at the center of the main facade, is set back under a round stone arch that rises from the foundation, and is topped by a curved portico-like roof section. Single windows flank the entrance outside the arch. The second floor windows, a band of four windows, are sheltered by a rounded continuation of the main roof. The windows used in the building are all diamond-paned casement windows.

The church was built in 1902 to provide worship services to the area's summer population; its architect was Grosvenor Atterbury. The church was closed in favor of a year-round building, the Abby Chapel in Seal Harbor village, and the former Seal Harbor Congregational Church building was purchased by a local summer resident.

== See also ==
- National Register of Historic Places listings in Hancock County, Maine
