= Jesup Memorial Library =

- U.S. National Register of Historic Places
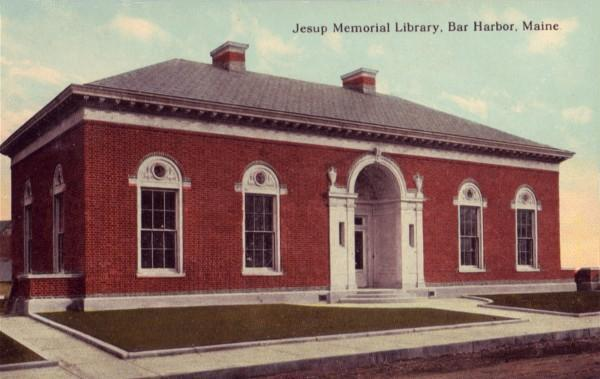
- Postcard view, c. 1912

- Location within Maine Location within the United States
- Location: 34 Mt. Desert St., Bar Harbor, Maine
- Coordinates: 44°23′12″N 68°12′25″W
- Area: less than one acre
- Built: 1911
- Architect: Delano and Aldrich
- Architectural style: Colonial Revival
- MPS: Maine Public Libraries MPS
- NRHP reference No.: 91000323
- Added to NRHP: April 1, 1991

Jesup Memorial Library is the public library of Bar Harbor, Maine. It is located in an architecturally distinguished Colonial Revival building at 34 Mount Desert Street in the town's main village. The building was built in 1910-11, donated to the community by Mrs. Morris K. Jesup in memory of her late husband, both of them longtime summer residents of the area, and was listed on the National Register of Historic Places in 1991 for its architecture.

== Architecture and history ==
The Jesup Library is set on the south side of Mount Desert Street (Maine State Route 3), about one block west of Bar Harbor's village green. It is a single-story brick building, with a slate hip roof. Its front facade is five bays wide, with a centered entrance recessed in a limestone arch flanked by paired pilasters, and a medallion above the doorway depicting an open book. The flanking bays have sash windows topped by rounded limestone panels with bullseye insets. The roof cornice is modillioned, and a pair of chimneys rise from the interior. The windows on the sides have a similar treatment to those on the front. An ell extends from the center of the rear, giving the building a T shape.

Bar Harbor's first library was organized by summer residents in 1875, and was at first a very small affair, operating out of people's homes before a small library building was built in 1877. By the early 1900s the library collection had grown to more than 8,000 volumes. Mrs. Morris K. Jesup, a longtime Bar Harbor summer resident, funded the $70,000 to build this building, and gave a $50,000 endowment for its maintenance. It was designed by the New York City firm of Delano and Aldrich and built in 1910-11.

In 2026, an addition to east side of the original building opened. Designed by Simons Architects out of Portland, Maine, the building was constructed with cross-laminated timber. The new wing is named for Thomas Lord, former leader of the LORD Corporation.

== Gallery ==
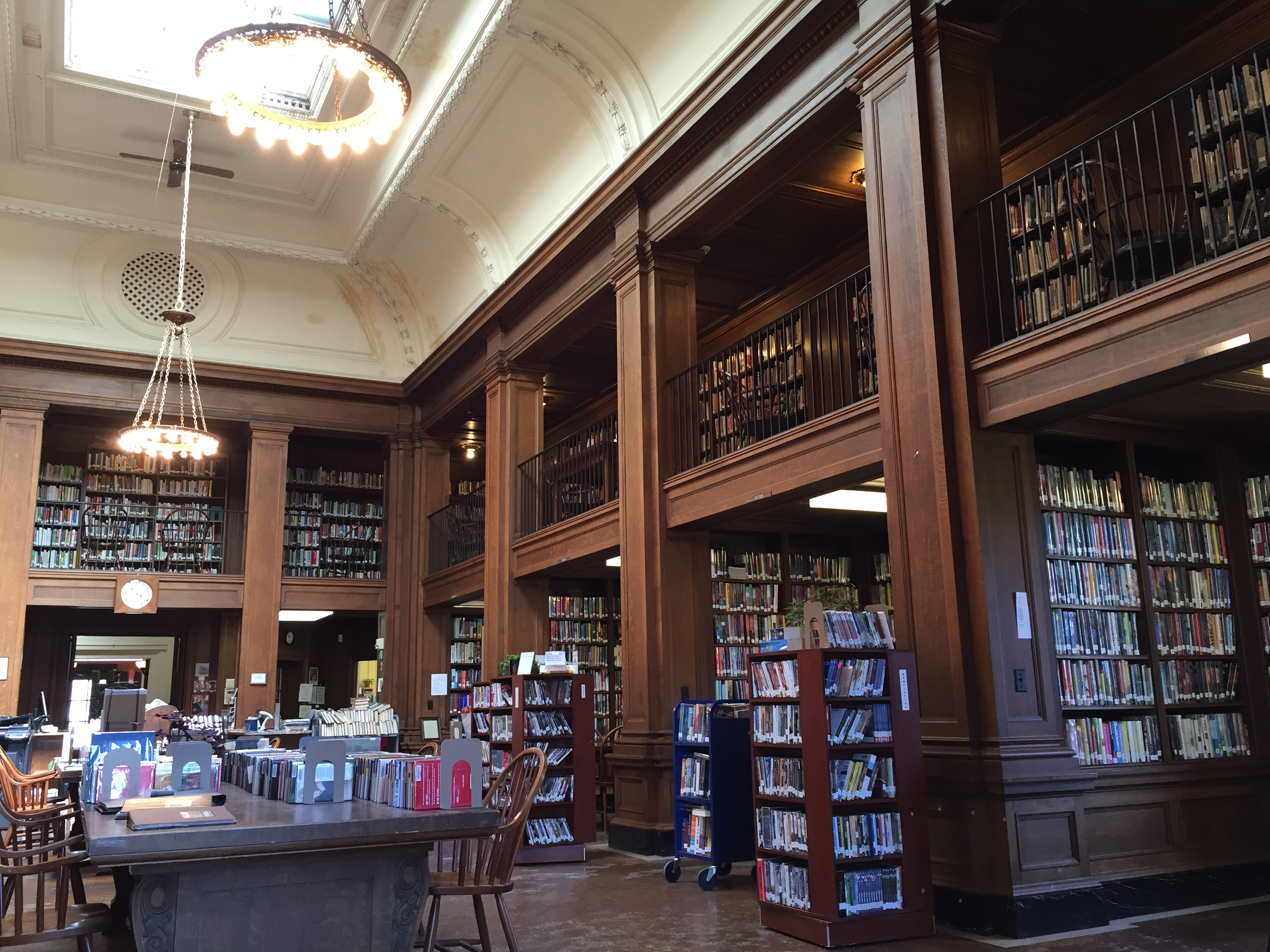
The library's interior, pictured in 2015

== See also ==
- National Register of Historic Places listings in Hancock County, Maine
