= Dix Family Stable =

- U.S. National Register of Historic Places
- Location within Maine Location within the United States
- Location: Rt. 102A, Bass Harbor, Maine
- Coordinates: 44°14′33″N 68°20′41″W
- Area: 1.5 acres (0.61 ha)
- Built: 1890
- Architectural style: Queen Anne
- NRHP reference No.: 90000578
- Added to NRHP: April 5, 1990

The Dix Family Stable is an unusual residential outbuilding (now probably converted to a residence) on Stable Lane in Bass Harbor, Maine. This architecturally distinctive former carriage barn was probably built in the 1890s, and is demonstrably based on a pattern published in Shoppell's Modern Houses, an architectural pattern book. Outbuildings constructed from such patterns are extremely rare, and this one is in excellent condition. It was listed on the National Register of Historic Places in 1990.

== Description and history ==
The construction history of this particular building is not very well known. The property was acquired in 1881 by Almira T. Dix from her father in 1881, with an additional acre added in 1892. The building is assumed to have been built around this time, along with the Dixes' elaborate residence, which has not survived. Its builder is unknown, but it is clearly based on pattern 589 in Shoppell's Modern Houses, published in 1889. Although the practice of building from mail-order pattern books like this one was widespread, surviving instances of outbuildings with a documented connection to them are extremely rare. The building was moved about 50 feet (15 m) onto a new concrete foundation in the late 1980s.

The building is a roughly square wood frame structure, two stories in height. It has an unusual roof line, with its main ridge line running from side to side, with clipped ends. The front facade has a large pent gable with a smaller projecting section at the top, and there is a rear hip-roof projection. A gable-roofed ventilator crowns the main ridge line. The building is sheathed with clapboards on the first floor, and with weathered shingles above. The main facade has a track-mounted vehicle entry door at the center, flanked on each side by twelve-pane fixed windows. At the second level, which is separated from the first by a flaring of the siding, is a double door above the vehicle entry, flanked by small six-pane windows. This is sheltered by a triangular projecting gable. The shingling on this facade is scallop-cut. The interior was originally designed to house carriages and provide stabling for one or two horses. The downstairs walls were finished with wainscoting, while the upper loft area was unfinished.

== See also ==
- National Register of Historic Places listings in Hancock County, Maine
