= Old Hancock County Buildings =

- U.S. National Register of Historic Places
- Location within Maine Location within the United States
- Location: Court St., Ellsworth, Maine
- Coordinates: 44°32′20″N 68°25′46″W
- Area: 1 acre (0.40 ha)
- Built: 1834
- Architect: John L. Moore
- Architectural style: Greek Revival
- NRHP reference No.: 77000161
- Added to NRHP: November 23, 1977

The Old Hancock County Buildings are a pair of Greek Revival buildings on Court Street, at a triangular intersection with U.S. Route 1 (US 1) and Maine State Route 172 in Ellsworth, Maine. Originally built in 1834 and 1838 to house Ellsworth Town Hall and the Hancock County courthouse, they are now owned and occupied by the Courthouse Art Gallery. The buildings were listed on the National Register of Historic Places in 1977.

== Description and history ==
The former courthouse and town hall occupy a triangular parcel of land bounded by Court Street, US 1, and Maine State Route 172, across the Union River from Ellsworth's central business district. Most of the lot is grassy, sloping up to Court Street, where the courthouse stands to the south and the town hall to the north. Both buildings face the green to the east. The courthouse has a first floor of brick, but both buildings are otherwise wooden frame, 1 1/2 stories in height, with a side gable roof, clapboard siding, and a granite foundation. In both cases the roof extends over an arcade in the Doric order at both the front and rear of the building; that of the courthouse has eight columns, while that of the town hall has six. The courthouse front has two large gable-roof dormers in the front, with paired double windows topped by a small lunette; a similar dormer appears on the rear.

The triangular parcel on which the buildings stand was given to the town in 1833 by the Hebert family, with the proviso that the town hall be built there, and the county courthouse, should Ellsworth be chosen as Hancock County's county seat. The town hall was built in 1834; after the town was named county seat in 1837, it and the property were transferred to the county, which built the courthouse in 1838. The county used the buildings as a courthouse and registry until 1886, when those facilities were moved to newer and larger quarters. This property was given back to the city, which repurposed the courthouse as a high school, later expanding into the former town hall, joining the two building via an unheated covered passage. The school closed in 1924, and the buildings were subsequently condemned due to their deteriorating condition. Public outcry forestalled this, and the buildings were gradually rehabilitated in the 1960s, seeing occasional use by community organizations.

The courthouse was sold to private owners in 2005, with preservation restrictions, and is now operated as the Courthouse Gallery. The gallery has since expanded into the adjacent former town hall.

== See also ==
- National Register of Historic Places listings in Hancock County, Maine
