= Eastbrook Baptist Church and Eastbrook Town House =

Historic church in Maine, United States

- U.S. National Register of Historic Places
- Location within Maine Location within the United States
- Location: ME 200, Eastbrook, Maine
- Coordinates: 44°40′42″N 68°16′0″W
- Area: 2 acres (0.81 ha)
- Built: 1860
- Architectural style: Greek Revival
- NRHP reference No.: 78000163
- Added to NRHP: December 18, 1978

The Eastbrook Baptist Church and Eastbrook Town House are a pair historic civic buildings on Maine State Route 200 (SR 200) in the center of Eastbrook, Maine. The church, built 1860, and the town house, built 1880, are both late examples of Greek Revival architecture, the latter apparently built in stylistic imitation of the former. The buildings were listed as a pair on the National Register of Historic Places in 1978.

== Description and history ==
The Eastbrook Baptist Church is a single-story wood-frame structure, with clapboard siding, set on the west side of SR 200. Its main facade has simple paneled pilasters at the corners, and a plain entablature (which extends around the building) below a plainly-decorated triangular pediment. The single-stage square tower that rises above is a later addition. There are two symmetrically placed entrances, each flanked by pilasters and topped by an entablature with cornice. The side walls each have three twelve-over-twelve windows. Its 1860 construction date is at the very end of the range in which Greek Revival buildings were generally built in Maine.

The town house, now apparently vacant, also stands on the west side of SR 200, just north of the church. It is also a single-story wood-frame structure with clapboard siding. Its main facade is also relatively simple: the front-facing gable is not fully pedimented, having only short returned. There are corner paneled pilasters as with the church. It has a centered double-door entry, which is topped by a transom window and framed by pilasters and an entablature with cornice. The entrance is flanked by sash windows topped by simple cornices, and there is a similar window in the gable. The side elevations each have two windows, and a plain entablature running below the roofline. Built in 1880, it shares obvious similarities with its neighbor, even though they are separated by a wooded lot.

== See also ==
- National Register of Historic Places listings in Hancock County, Maine
