= Shore Acres (Lamoine Beach, Maine) =

- U.S. National Register of Historic Places
- Location within Maine Location within the United States
- Location: 791 Lamoine Beach Rd., Lamoine Beach, Maine
- Coordinates: 44°27′13″N 68°17′5″W
- Area: 1 acre (0.40 ha)
- Built: 1887
- Architectural style: Late Victorian
- NRHP reference No.: 00000373
- Added to NRHP: April 14, 2000

Shore Acres is a historic former summer hotel at 791 Lamoine Beach Road in Lamoine, Maine. With a possible construction history dating to about 1800, it is one of the coastal community's oldest buildings, and is the only surviving 19th-century hostelry in the town. Extensively altered in 1887 and operated as an inn between 1887 and 1942 as the Des Isles Inn, it is now a summer rental property, located within walking distance of Lamoine Beach State Park. The property was listed on the National Register of Historic Places in 2000.

== Description and history ==
Shore Acres is set on the south side of Lamoine Beach Road, near its eastern end in the southern part of the town, between the Lamoine Beach State Park campground and beach parking area. It is a 2 1/2-story wood-frame building that now has relatively vernacular styling. It has a side-gable roof which has a projecting section at the western (right) end, wooden clapboard siding, and an open hip-roofed porch extending across its front (north-facing) facade. Shed-roof additions (both enclosed porches) span the eastern and southern sides. The entry connecting this rear porch to the main house has a projecting vestibule area with Greek Revival styling, suggesting it may once have been the main entrance. The interior reflects late 19th-century tastes, but includes some Federal period trim and wainscoting in the downstairs parlor. There is architectural evidence suggesting that house once had a large central chimney, although there is no evidence for the foundation of one in the partial basement.

The property has had a somewhat complex construction history. In 1796 Louis des Parres des Isles, secretary to a wealthy French landowner in the town, married Mary Googin, and is said to have built a house on this property soon afterward. It is unclear whether that house is this one with substantial alterations, or whether a new structure was built in 1887, when this building reached its approximate current shape. It was the community's only hotel during the 1880s, operated by des Isles' son William. By the early 20th century the building had been doubled in size, with historic photos showing large additions that had been removed by the 1930s. It may have acquired the name "Shore Acres" due to the popularity of a play written by James A. Herne, who summered at the nearby (and no longer extant) Gault House hotel prior to the 1893 publication of the play.

The 1886 date reflects the time the structure was expanded to a large Hotel. The original build date was approximately 1796, and the structure as viewed today, was the original farm house. The Hotel Shore Acres, as it was once known, was owned in the 1930s by Sherman Douglas, a then state senator. The Lamoine Historical Society has pictures of Senator Douglas and Henry Ford in Lamoine, promoting the area for a Summer White House. Seasonal Renters of this property state, "staying here is like going back in time and living, history."

== See also ==
- National Register of Historic Places listings in Hancock County, Maine
