= Edgecliff (Southwest Harbor, Maine) =

Historic house in Maine, United States

- U.S. National Register of Historic Places
- Location within Maine Location within the United States
- Location: 34 Norwood Lane, Southwest Harbor, Maine
- Coordinates: 44°17′4″N 68°19′2″W
- Area: 0.95 acres (0.38 ha)
- Built: 1887
- Architectural style: Shingle; Queen Anne
- NRHP reference No.: 13000835
- Added to NRHP: October 16, 2013

Edgecliff is a historic summer house at 34 Norwood Lane in Southwest Harbor, Maine. Built in 1886-87 and enlarged in 1910–11, it is an architecturally distinctive blend of Shingle and Queen Anne styles. Its original construction was designed by William Augustus Bates, a New York City-area architect, for Samuel and Annie Downs, teachers at the Abbot Academy of Andover, Massachusetts. The house was listed on the National Register of Historic Places in 2013.

== Description and history ==
Edgecliff is located east of the village center of Southwest Harbor on Clark Point, a peninsula that projects into Somes Sound, the body of water that divides Mount Desert Island into two lobes. The house stands about 75 feet (23 m) from the eastern shore, facing the water. It is a two-story wood-frame structure, rectangular in shape except for an east-facing projecting bay, and a single-story wraparound porch. The exterior is finished in wooden clapboards and shingles, with relatively plain wooden trim elements. There is a line of flared siding separating the first and second levels. The roofline is complex, punctuated with dormers, gables, and projecting bays. Portions of the building foundation have been covered in shingles, while others are covered by latticework with viny plantings growing on them. The interior is relatively simply decorated, with crown molding throughout both public and private spaces, and slightly more detailed door and window molding in the public spaces.

The house was commissioned by Samuel and Annie Downs, both teachers at Abbot Academy in Andover, Massachusetts. They had built a small cottage elsewhere on Clark Point in 1882–83, and were one of the first summer visitors to build a permanent summer home in the area. They hired William Augustus Bates, a New York City-area architect known for his summer houses, to design a larger house for that property, This resulted in the first stage of construction of Edgecliff in 1886–87, at the location of the first cottage. After Samuel Downs died in 1909, the house was purchased by Schuyler Clark, who moved it to its present location, and had it enlarged with a two-story addition to the north and increased porch space. This work, designed by an as-yet unidentified architect, improved the internal layout of the building, and gave it more Queen Anne touches than the predominantly Shingle-style building the Downses had built. The house remained in Clark family hands until 1970.

== See also ==
- National Register of Historic Places in Hancock County, Maine
