= Garland Farm =

- U.S. National Register of Historic Places
- U.S. Historic district
- Location within Maine Location within the United States
- Location: 475 Bay View Drive (corner of ME 3), Bar Harbor, Maine
- Coordinates: 44°25′42″N 68°19′28″W
- Area: 4.9 acres (2.0 ha)
- Built: c. 1800
- Architect: Robert W. Patterson (1955 addition)
- Landscape designer: Beatrix Farrand
- Architectural style: Queen Anne
- NRHP reference No.: 05001174
- Added to NRHP: October 19, 2005

Garland Farm is a historic house and garden property at 475 Bay View Drive in Bar Harbor, Maine. The property, listed on the National Register of Historic Places in 2005, is significant as the last home of the noted landscape designer Beatrix Farrand, and is now owned by the Beatrix Farrand Society. The property is open to the public, and houses a research library of Farrand materials, as well as gardens established by Farrand in the later years of her life.

== Description and history ==
The Garland Farm property consists of about 5 acres (2.0 ha) of woods and fields, with a main house, greenhouse, barn, and a small shop. The main house, a Cape built c. 1800 and rebuilt in the mid-19th century, was acquired by the Garland family in the 1870s, and was the home of Lewis and Amy Garland, the superintendent and chief horticulturalist of Beatrix Farrand's Reef Point Estate. When Farrand decided in 1955 to abandon Reef Point, the Garlands took her in, building an addition onto the rear of the house, which was designed by Bar Harbor architect Robert W. Patterson. This addition is separated from the main house by a narrow hyphen, and uses materials recycled from Farrand's Reef Point cottage, which was demolished.

When Farrand came to the property, she brought some of her plants from Reef Point, and established gardens on either side of her wing. The front garden, east of the wing, featured her favorite Asian and native plants, set in a space lined by a low box hedge with a bluestone path. A rustic bench taken from Reef Point adorns this space. The rear garden is a larger formal space, surrounded by a fence from Reef Point, and is visually joined to the house, which has French doors from each room opening out onto it.

The property was acquired in 2004 by the Beatrix Farrand Society, established in part to preserve her legacy at this location. The wing of the house built for Farrand has been adapted for use as a research library.

== See also ==
- National Register of Historic Places listings in Hancock County, Maine
