= Rural Hall (Surry, Maine) =

- U.S. National Register of Historic Places
- Location within Maine Location within the United States
- Location: Surry Rd., 1 mi. E of Contention Cove, Surry, Maine
- Coordinates: 44°29′42″N 68°26′46″W
- Area: less than one acre
- Built: 1871
- Architectural style: Italianate
- NRHP reference No.: 04001049
- Added to NRHP: September 22, 2004

Rural Hall is a historic community meeting place on Surry Road (Maine State Route 172) in Surry, Maine. Built in 1871-76, Rural Hall has been the principal social meeting point for the small rural community of East Surry. It was listed on the National Register of Historic Places in 2004 for its importance in the social history of the community.

== Description and history ==
Rural Hall is set facing south on the south side of Surry Road, about 1 mile (1.6 km) east of the village center of Surry. It is a long rectangular wood frame structure, with a front-gable roof, clapboard siding, and a stone foundation. It is set facing away from the road because the road alignment at the time of its construction 1871-76 was to the south. Its main facade is three bays wide, with a central entrance sheltered by an enclosed vestibuled under a hip roof. The entry is flanked by paired narrow sash windows, a form repeated above the entrance in the gable end. Similar window pairs line the sides of the building. The rear, which now faces the road, has no windows and a single doorway sheltered by a bracketed gable-roof hood. The interior of the building, beyond the vestibule, is an open auditorium, with portable wooden benches and a raised stage at the north end. A balcony, probably added late in the 19th century, extends across the southern end of the hall. Part of the balcony is taken up by a small kitchen area, added in the 1940s, from which food can be delivered to the lower level via a dumbwaiter. An area under the balcony has been enclosed for use as a bathroom. The building retains its original heating system—a wood stove with a long chimney pipe.

Construction of the Rural Hall had its genesis in the 1868 meeting of a local sewing circle, at which it was decided to raise funds for construction of a community hall. The Rural Hall Association was formed in 1870, and funds raised by subscription. The building's construction between 1871 and 1876 was chronicled by the local historian, who also donated the land on which it was built. The hall has been used since its construction by a wide variety of local social groups.

== See also ==
- National Register of Historic Places listings in Hancock County, Maine
