= Nannau, Maine =

Historic house in Maine, United States

- Nannau
- U.S. National Register of Historic Places
- Location within Maine Location within the United States
- Location: Lower Main St., Bar Harbor, Maine
- Coordinates: 44°22′31″N 68°11′45″W
- Area: 2 acres (0.81 ha)
- Built: 1904
- Architect: Andrews, Jaques & Rantoul
- Architectural style: Shingle Style
- NRHP reference No.: 84000322
- Added to NRHP: November 8, 1984

Nannau is a historic summer estate house in Bar Harbor, Maine. Located between Maine State Route 3 and overlooking Compass Harbor, this 1904 Shingle style house was built for David R. Ogden, a New York City lawyer, to designs by the Boston firm Andrews, Jaques and Rantoul. The house was characterized in 1906 as "an excellent example of shingle work"; it was listed on the National Register of Historic Places in 1984.

== Description and history ==
Nannau is set on the south side of a private drive, south of the main village of Bar Harbor, and located between Maine State Route 3 and Compass Harbor, an inlet off Frenchman Bay. It has a two-story rectangular main block, oriented northwest to southeast, with projecting ells at both ends. It has a steeply pitched hip roof, with projecting 2 1/2-story gable sections on the main land-side facade, flanking a smaller single-story entry portico with its own steeply pitched hip roof with a flared edge. The walls are finished in wood shingles.

Nannau was designed by the Boston architectural firm of Andrews, Jaques, and Rantoul, who were responsible for the design of a number of Bar Harbor's finest summer estates. It was built in 1904 for David R. Ogden, a New York lawyer who helped found Saint Saviour's Church in Bar Harbor, and who gained a national reputation for his philanthropic work with the American Red Cross during the First World War. The house was featured in a 1906 edition of The Country House, in which it was described as "an excellent example of shingle work". The house in recent years was used as a bed and breakfast that is now closed. Currently it is a private residence.

== See also ==
- National Register of Historic Places listings in Hancock County, Maine
