= × Pachyveria glauca 'Little Jewel' =

Hybrid succulent cultivar

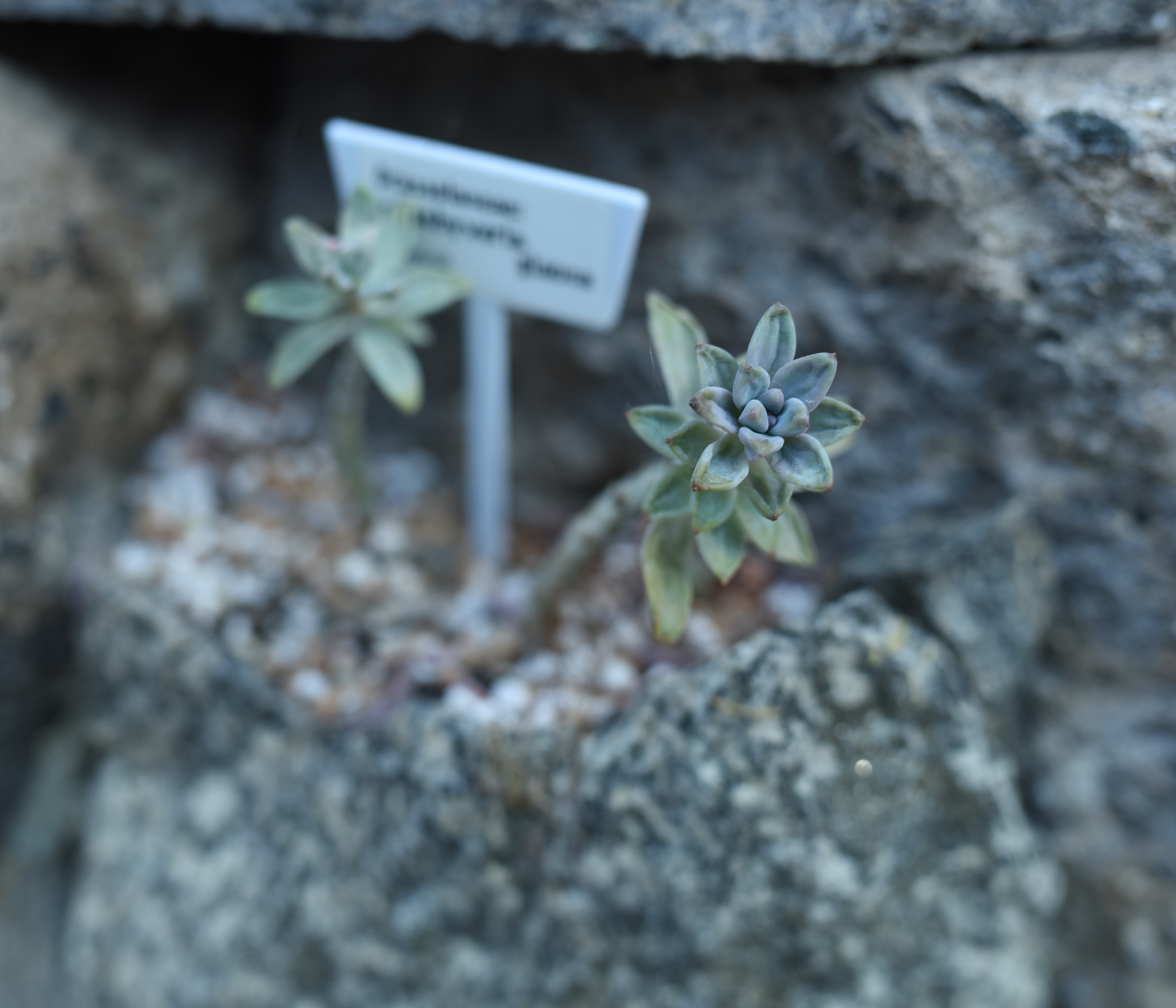
- Crassulaceae crossed with Pachyveria glauca (hybrid) at the Marsh Botanical Garden
- Species: × Pachyveria glauca
- Cultivar: 'Little Jewel'

× Pachyveria glauca 'Little Jewel' succulent plants are hybrids in the nothogenus × Pachyveria (Pachyphytum and Echeveria). It is a versatile plant, thriving in the (frost free) garden and in containers.

== Description ==
This plant has cylindrical tapered leaves, shading from powdery blue with a of purple at the bottom of the plant to a light green at the points of the top leaves. That color slowly darkens down the length of the plant. Leaves resemble gems-jewels.

== Cultivation ==
This plant propagates itself by dropping leaves, which then sprout new plants, and also by stem cuttings.

== Habitat ==
× Pachyveria plants do best in desert and arid climates, and grow well in porous, well-drained soil. They grow well in full sun, though prefer a bit of shade in more sizzling heat of 92 and higher degrees Fahrenheit (33 degrees Celsius). They are drought and heat wave-tolerant, but love plentiful summertime water, and hardy to around 30-35 degrees Fahrenheit (-1 to 1 degrees Celsius).

== See also ==
- Echeveria elegans
- Echeveria derenbergii
