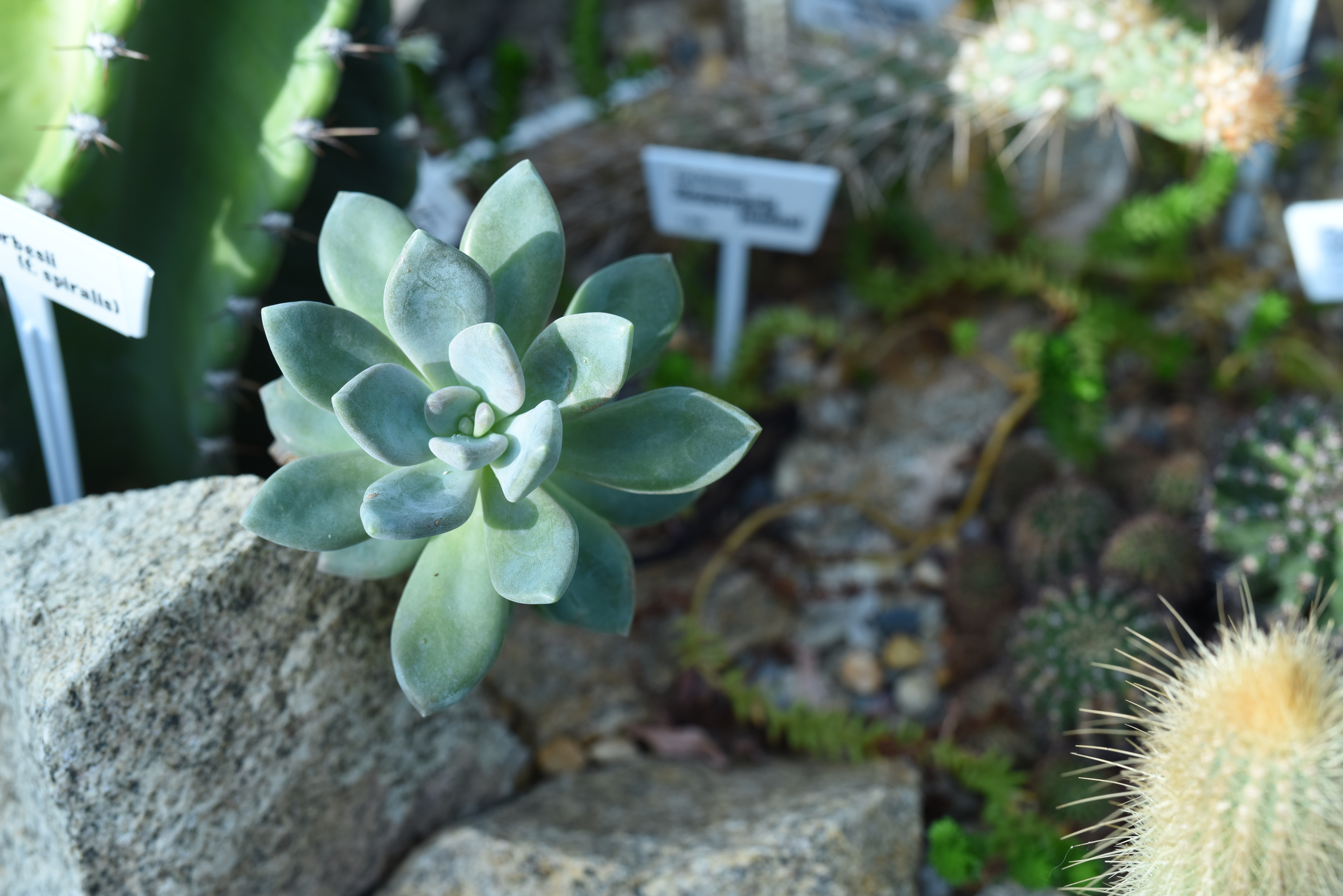
- A Pachyveria. Found at Marsh Botanical Garden

Scientific classification
- Kingdom: Plantae
- Clade: Tracheophytes
- Clade: Angiosperms
- Clade: Eudicots
- Order: Saxifragales
- Family: Crassulaceae
- Subfamily: Sempervivoideae
- Tribe: Sedeae
- Genus: × Pachyveria; Haage & Schmidt ex A.Berger

= × Pachyveria =

Hybrid genus of succulents

× Pachyveria is a hybrid succulent. They typically grow to 2–6 inches. They grow best in soil full of phosphorus and potassium, but low in nitrogen. Pachyveria are a hybrid cross between Pachyphytum and Echeveria. × Pachyveria glauca 'Little Jewel' is a cultivar of × Pachyveria.

== Cultivation ==
The cultivation of × Pachyveria should be done with a substantial and very draining land, composed of fertilized soil and coarse sand. This type of plant prefers a sunny position that will allow the plant to take on a compact and rather low aspect. The watering will have to be rather abundant during the summer and gradually reduced during the winter. The winter temperature should not be less than about 7 °C, even if the plants bear lower temperatures. Many of the cultivated plants are similar to one or another species from which the crossing has been composed and they easily develop in the shape of more or less abnormal ridges. This kind of plants is very sought after by collectors and specialists.

== Propagation ==
The multiplication occurs in spring, by cuttings, detaching an apical rosette and putting it to root in a bed of sand and peat at a temperature of about 18 °C; the stem from which the rosette has been detached, will put other shoots forming new stems.
