= Lederle =

Lederle may refer to:

- 2444 Lederle, asteroid
- Lederle Laboratories, acquired by Wyeth which was acquired by Pfizer
- John W. Lederle, academic and former president of the University of Massachusetts Amherst
- Lederle Tower, a research facility named after John Lederle, located in Amherst, Massachusetts
- Arthur F. Lederle (1887–1972)
- Neville Lederle (1938–2019)
- Franz Xaver Lederle (born 1931), German cinematographer
