= Thuya Garden =

Park in Hancock County, Maine, United States

Coordinates: 44°18′01″N 68°16′35″W

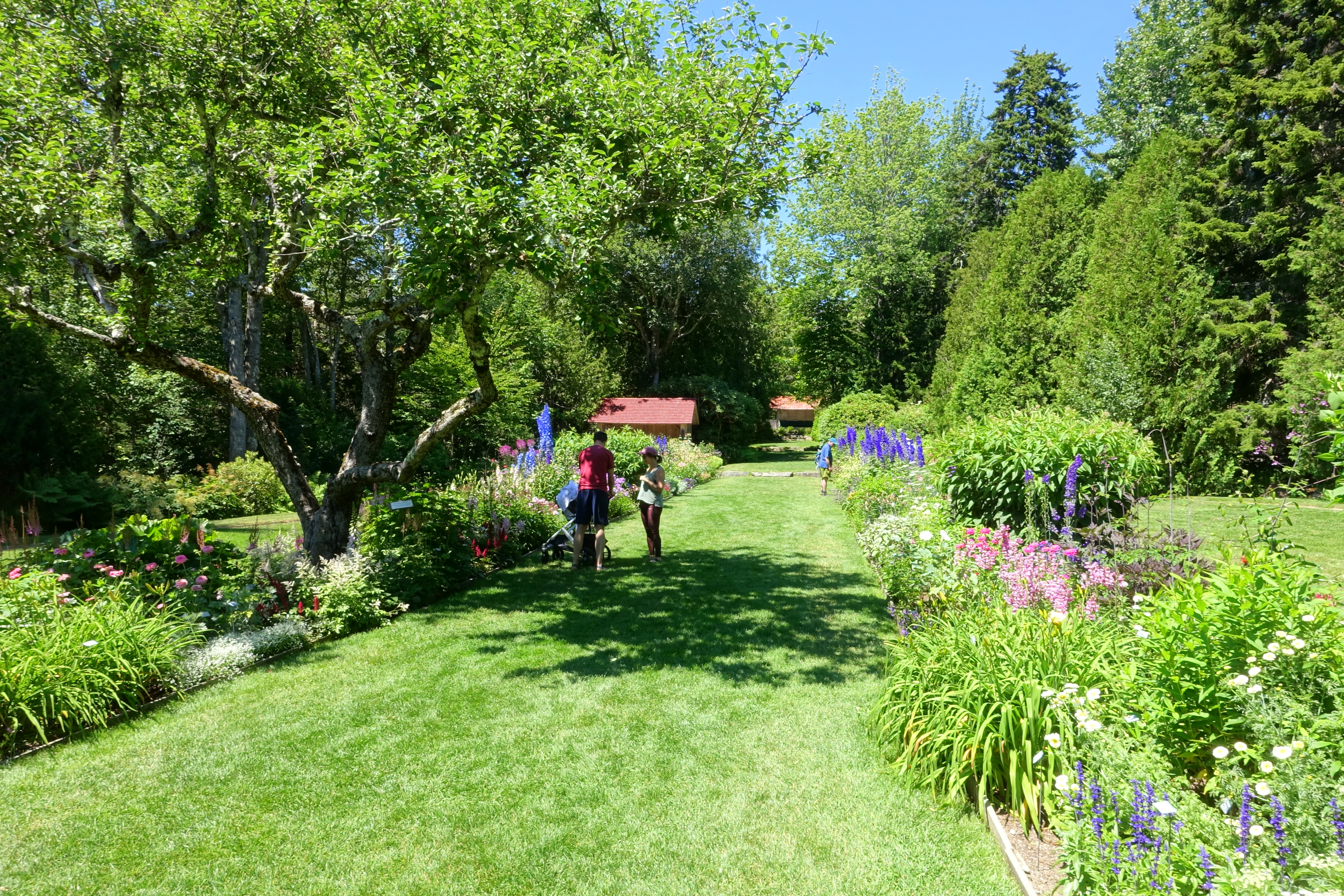
- Thuya Garden, 2018
- Interactive map of Thuya Garden
- Location: 15 Thuya Drive, Northeast Harbor, Maine
- Established: 1916 (110 years ago)
- Parking: Free, on-site
- Website: www.gardenpreserve.org/thuya-garden

Thuya Garden is a semi-formal herbaceous garden, in the style of Gertrude Jekyll, located at 15 Thuya Drive, Northeast Harbor, Maine. The garden itself is open daily from dawn to dusk, from the second weekend of June through Indigenous People’s Day. The lodge is also open from June through October from 10 AM to 5 PM.

The garden is located on the grounds of Thuya Lodge, built between 1912 and 1916 for Boston landscape architect and rusticator Joseph Henry Curtis. At that time, today's border garden was an orchard of cherries and apples surrounded by forest. After Curtis' death in 1928, he left Thuya Lodge and the Asticou Terraces to the town of Mount Desert. To ensure the home was protected and maintained it was placed in a trust directed by Curtis’ friend Charles K. Savage, an heir of the nearby Asticou Inn and creator of the Asticou Azalea Garden. Today's border garden was originally conceived in 1933 by Savage, and built from 1956 to 1961 with plants from Beatrix Farrand's Reef Point Garden in Bar Harbor when that estate was dismantled in 1956, and with financial help from John D. Rockefeller Jr. It opened to the public in 1962. Other parts of the gardens, including the upper lawn, moss garden, and Savage Memorial were further developed and expanded in the 1980s and 90s.

The garden is laid out as a narrow lawn axis with cross-axes, edged by two rustic pavilions to its north and a shallow reflecting pool to the south. The main border garden contains about 60% perennials and 40% annuals, with this approximation changing yearly as designs slightly change. Native planting beds, rhododendrons, and an extensive mossy hillside are also found within the garden.
