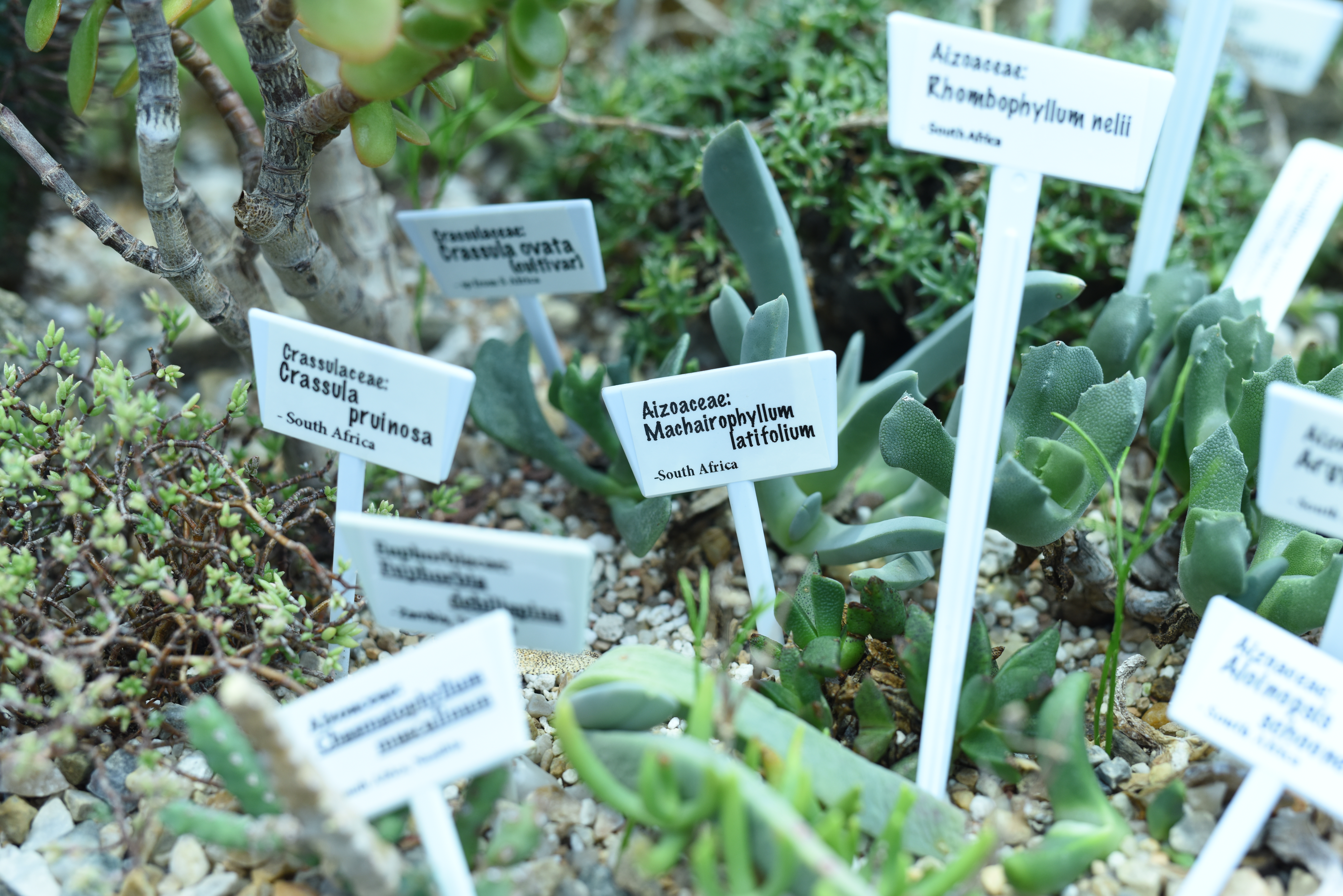
- At Marsh Botanical Garden (labelled M. latifolium)

Scientific classification
- Kingdom: Plantae
- Clade: Tracheophytes
- Clade: Angiosperms
- Clade: Eudicots
- Order: Caryophyllales
- Family: Aizoaceae
- Genus: Machairophyllum
- Species: M. brevifolium

Binomial name
- Machairophyllum brevifolium L.Bolus

Synonyms
- Machairophyllum latifolium L.Bolus

= Machairophyllum brevifolium =

Species of succulent

Machairophyllum brevifolium, synonym Machairophyllum latifolium, is a member of the family Aizoaceae, and is native to the Cape Provinces of South Africa.
