= Reef Point Estate =

Coordinates: 44.5710°N 67.7507°W

Reef Point Estate was located in Bar Harbor, Maine, United States, on Mount Desert Island. Reef Point was the coastal “cottage” of Mary Cadwalder Rawle and Frederic Rhinelander Jones, the parents of landscape architect, Beatrix Farrand (1872–1959). It stood beside Bar Harbor's Shore Path.

== Reef Point ==
The residence was shingle-style with turrets, and high gables overlooking the Atlantic Ocean. Wide verandas from which to view the sea were embroidered by vines of clematis and honeysuckle while the structure itself was shielded from the strong ocean winds by red and white spruce trees. Vegetation of this property proved crucial. The continually evolving gardens interwoven by grass paths that surrounded the Reef Point structure were essential to creating the estate. In 1917, Reef Point was deeded to Beatrix by her mother. In 1935 following her mother’s death Farrand and her husband Max Farrand (1869–1945), set about turning Reef point into a horticultural study center, one of the most ambitious projects in her career. The Farrands spent their summers at Reef Point and together, began creating their visionary educational enterprise: Reef Point Gardens. This property played an instrumental role in Beatrix Farrand’s life and her dedication to the estate with particular attention to the grounds was a lifelong and heartfelt endeavor. One of many projects which was undertaken at the estate was the creation of a bog garden, to illustrate how indigenous plants could be used creatively. Conversely, groupings of numerous types of azaleas demonstrated how seemingly exotic plants could survive the severe Maine climate.

In 1946 Farrand began publishing the Reef Point Bulletins in an attempt to explain the undertakings at Reef Point Gardens with the primary focus on the horticulture of the property. The species in the garden were documented, their growth and habits often closely logged and graphed. Plant choices for specific conditions were under intensive study, in this case plants suitable for the Bar Harbor region was of primary interest. Along with this publication, the grounds and gardens of the estate itself Farrand created a large library and collection of educational materials.

Perhaps in part because of the remoteness of location, scholarly use of Reef Point Gardens did not achieve the level Farrand desired. A devastating fire on Mount Desert Island in 1947 wiped out much of Bar Harbor's tax base, and the town badly needed its few taxpayers to assist with the cost of recovery. In 1955, concerned with the survival of Reef Point Gardens, following Bar Harbor's refusal to grant it tax-exempt status, Farrand decided that Reef Point’s future was not secure and reluctantly abandoned the project. Once the decision was made to end Reef Point Gardens, she swiftly took the steps to sell Reef Point for development. Farrand donated the contents of her library, a large collection of fine art prints, horticulture books, and design drawings to the department of Landscape Architecture at University of California, Berkeley to continue her initial goal of spreading knowledge and education concerning landscape design. Her herbarium of approximately 2000 sheets that documents exactly what plants were used and where they were planted is housed at the University & Jepson Herbaria, University of California, Berkeley.

== Garland Farm ==
Following the dismantlement of Reef Point Beatrix Farrand joined the Garlands, Lewis and Amy at Garland Farm Estate in their 1800s farm house near Salisbury Cove. Lewis Garland was the former administrative gardener of Reef Point Gardens and Amy his wife, also a horticulturalist, was one of Farrand’s close friends. The main house at Reef Point was dismantled; however some fixtures, materials, and architectural elements were salvaged for reuse in the construction of Farrand's extension and addition to the Garland farmhouse. She also planted a small garden behind her addition that was maintained by the subsequent owners of the Garland property before it was acquired by the Beatrix Farrand Society. The Reef Point property itself was sold to Robert W. Patterson, her long-trusted architect and Reef Point board member. The vegetation of the estate however held a different future. Charles Kenneth Savage, local innkeeper, garden designer and board member, conceived of bold plan to rescue Farrand’s plants from the estate. With financial support, from John D. Rockefeller Jr. and other summer residents, the plants were moved and eventually supplied the material for two future gardens. Savage designed these two new gardens in Northeast Harbor (the Asticou Azalea Garden and Thuya Garden), raised funds for their creation, and supervised their construction.

In 2006 The Beatrix Farrand Society, a nonprofit Maine corporation began restoration of the Garland Farm estate. Restorations of the garden are still in the initial stages however, the Beatrix Farrand Society’s intent is, "to foster the art and science of horticulture and landscape design, with emphasis on the life and work of Beatrix Farrand. It seeks to reinstate Reef Point's original educational goals, with the establishment of a reference library and collections, regional trial gardens, and educational programs".
