= Crataegus jonesae =

Scientific classification
- Kingdom: Plantae
- Clade: Tracheophytes
- Clade: Angiosperms
- Clade: Eudicots
- Clade: Rosids
- Order: Rosales
- Family: Rosaceae
- Genus: Crataegus
- Species: C. jonesiae

Binomial name
- Crataegus jonesiae Sarg.

Synonyms
- C. harryi Sarg. C. laurentiana Sarg.

Species of hawthorn

Crataegus jonesiae is a species of hawthorn native to New England and Canada. It is named in honor of landscape architect Beatrix Jones Farrand, who first noticed it and brought it to Charles Sprague Sargent's attention.
