= Erika Edwards =

Evolutionary biologist

- Education: Yale University
- Scientific career
- Thesis: Pereskia and the origin of the cactus life form (2005)

Erika Jeannine Edwards is a professor at Yale University known for her work on evolution of plants. She is also the director of the Marsh Botanical Garden.

== Education and career ==
Edwards has a B.S. from Stanford University (1998) and earned her Ph.D. from Yale University where she worked on the evolution of the Pereskia, a genus of cactus. Following her Ph.D. she was a postdoctoral researcher at the University of California at Santa Barbara before accepting a position at Brown University as an assistant professor in 2007. In 2017 she moved to Yale University as a professor and director of the Marsh Botanical Garden.

In 2020 she began her term as president of the Society of Systematic Biologists.

== Research ==
Edwards research focuses on succulents and the evolution of C4 carbon fixation in plants. Her early research centered on Pereskia where she examined its physiology and its place in the evolutionary history of cactus plants. Her research into C4 carbon fixation has examined how climate change alters the distribution of the C4 grasses and revealed that the C4 carbon fixation pathway gives plants an advantage in dry environments. Her subsequent research tracked the increase in C4 grasses with increases in tropical woodlands and savannas. Edwards led the working group which established the phylogeny of C4 grasses and defined the genetic differences across different types of grass. She uses changes in leaf shape to define how plants expend their resources during growth, examines plants' responses to changes in biome. and compares the parallel evolution of C4 photosynthesis and crassulacean acid metabolism.

== Selected publications ==
- Edwards, Erika J.; Osborne, Colin P.; Strömberg, Caroline A. E.; Smith, Stephen A.; Bond, William J.; Christin, Pascal-Antoine; Cousins, Asaph B.; Duvall, Melvin R.; Fox, David L.; Freckleton, Robert P.; Ghannoum, Oula; Hartwell, James; Huang, Yongsong; Janis, Christine M.; Keeley, Jon E.; Kellogg, Elizabeth A.; Knapp, Alan K.; Leakey, Andrew D. B.; Nelson, David M.; Saarela, Jeffery M.; Sage, Rowan F.; Sala, Osvaldo E.; Salamin, Nicolas; Still, Christopher J.; Tipple, Brett (April 30, 2010). "The Origins of C 4 Grasslands: Integrating Evolutionary and Ecosystem Science". Science. 328 (5978): 587–591. Bibcode:2010Sci...328..587E. doi:10.1126/science.1177216. PMID 20431008. S2CID 17934192.
- Edwards, Erika J.; Osborne, Colin P.; Strömberg, Caroline A. E.; Smith, Stephen A.; Consortium, C4 Grasses; Bond, William J.; Christin, Pascal-Antoine; Cousins, Asaph B.; Duvall, Melvin R.; Fox, David L.; Freckleton, Robert P.; Ghannoum, Oula; Hartwell, James; Huang, Yongsong; Janis, Christine M.; Keeley, Jon E.; Kellogg, Elizabeth A.; Knapp, Alan K.; Leakey, Andrew D. B.; Nelson, David M.; Saarela, Jeffery M.; Sage, Rowan F.; Sala, Osvaldo E.; Salamin, Nicolas; Still, Christopher J.; Tipple, Brett (April 30, 2010). "The Origins of C4 Grasslands: Integrating Evolutionary and Ecosystem Science". Science. 328 (5978): 587–591. Bibcode:2010Sci...328..587E. doi:10.1126/science.1177216. PMID 20431008. S2CID 17934192.
- Arakaki, M.; Christin, P.-A.; Nyffeler, R.; Lendel, A.; Eggli, U.; Ogburn, R. M.; Spriggs, E.; Moore, M. J.; Edwards, E. J. (May 17, 2011). "Contemporaneous and recent radiations of the world's major succulent plant lineages". Proceedings of the National Academy of Sciences. 108 (20): 8379–8384. Bibcode:2011PNAS..108.8379A. doi:10.1073/pnas.1100628108. PMC 3100969. PMID 21536881.
- Edwards, E. J.; Smith, S. A. (February 9, 2010). "Phylogenetic analyses reveal the shady history of C4 grasses". Proceedings of the National Academy of Sciences. 107 (6): 2532–2537. Bibcode:2010PNAS..107.2532E. doi:10.1073/pnas.0909672107. PMC 2823882. PMID 20142480.

== Awards and honors ==
In 2016, Edwards received a Presidential Early Career Award for Scientists and Engineers (PECASE).
