= Green Spring Gardens Park =

Historic place and park in Alexandria, Virginia, United States

- Green Spring
- U.S. National Register of Historic Places
- Virginia Landmarks Register
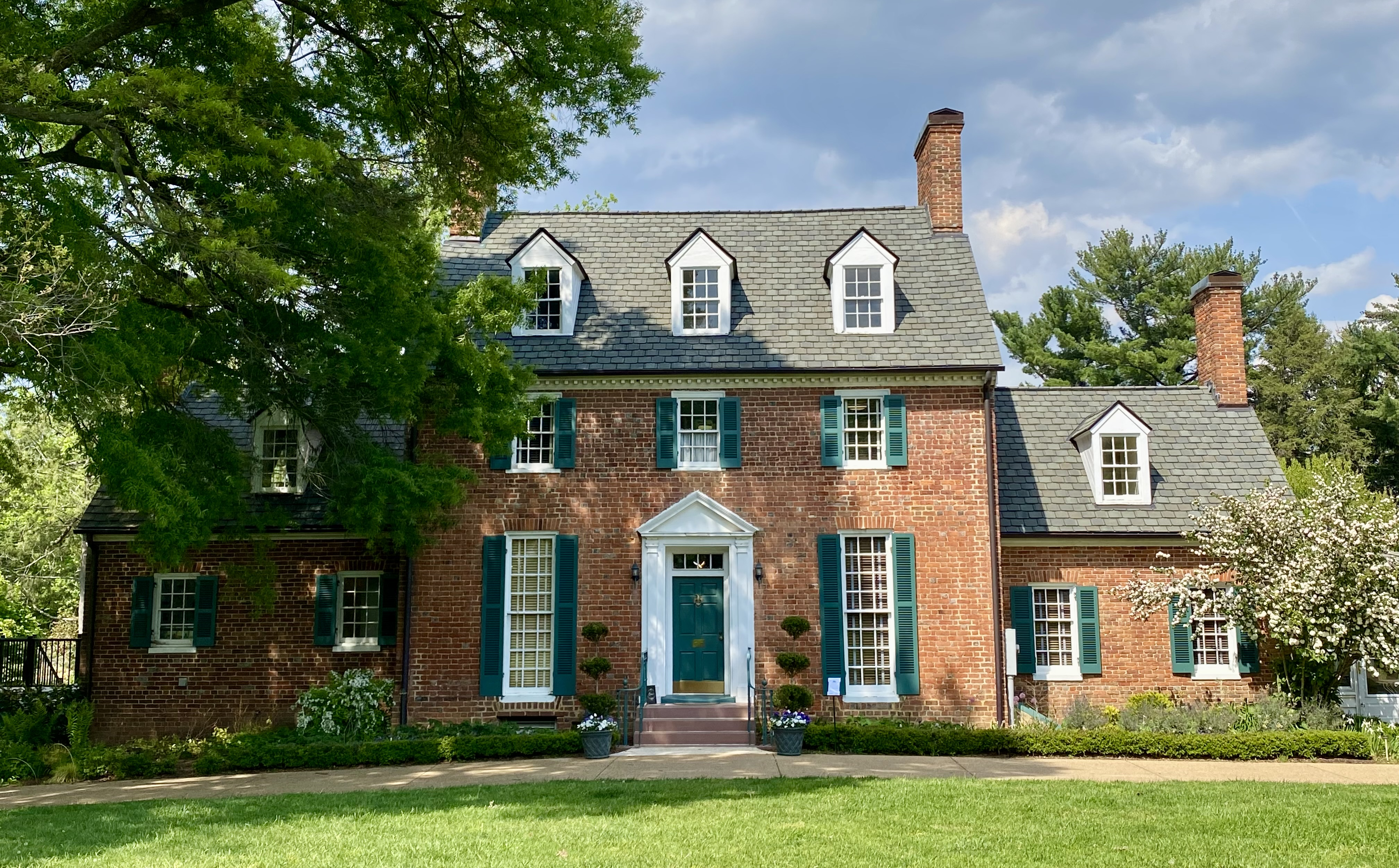
- Facade of Green Spring house
- Location: 4601 Green Spring Road, near Alexandria, Virginia
- Coordinates: 38°49′N 77°9′W
- Area: 9.5 acres (3.8 ha)
- Built: 1777, 1942
- Architects: Farrand, Beatrix; Macomber, Walter
- Architectural style: Colonial, Colonial Revival
- Website: Official website
- NRHP reference No.: 03001089
- VLR No.: 029-0025

Significant dates
- Added to NRHP: October 22, 2003
- Designated VLR: June 18, 2003

Green Spring Gardens is a public park and garden in Alexandria, Virginia, United States. Located on land that was originally a plantation established in the 18th century, Green Spring Gardens was listed on the National Register of Historic Places in 2003 in recognition of its historic architecture. The property includes the Green Spring house and multiple landscaping sections which were designed by landscape architect Beatrix Farrand in the 1940s. The park grounds include a horticultural library, ponds, and a greenhouse. The park offers gardening classes and tours of the home, which has been converted into a museum.

== Etymology ==
The name Green Spring first appeared in an 1853 advertisement as "Green Springs"; the "s" was later dropped in an 1859 listing. Its name may derive from several natural springs located in the area. While under the ownership of Fountain Beattie between 1878 and 1917, the property was knowns as Captain Beattie's Farm; by the 1930s, it had reverted to Green Spring, which has been retained since.

== History ==
=== Early history ===
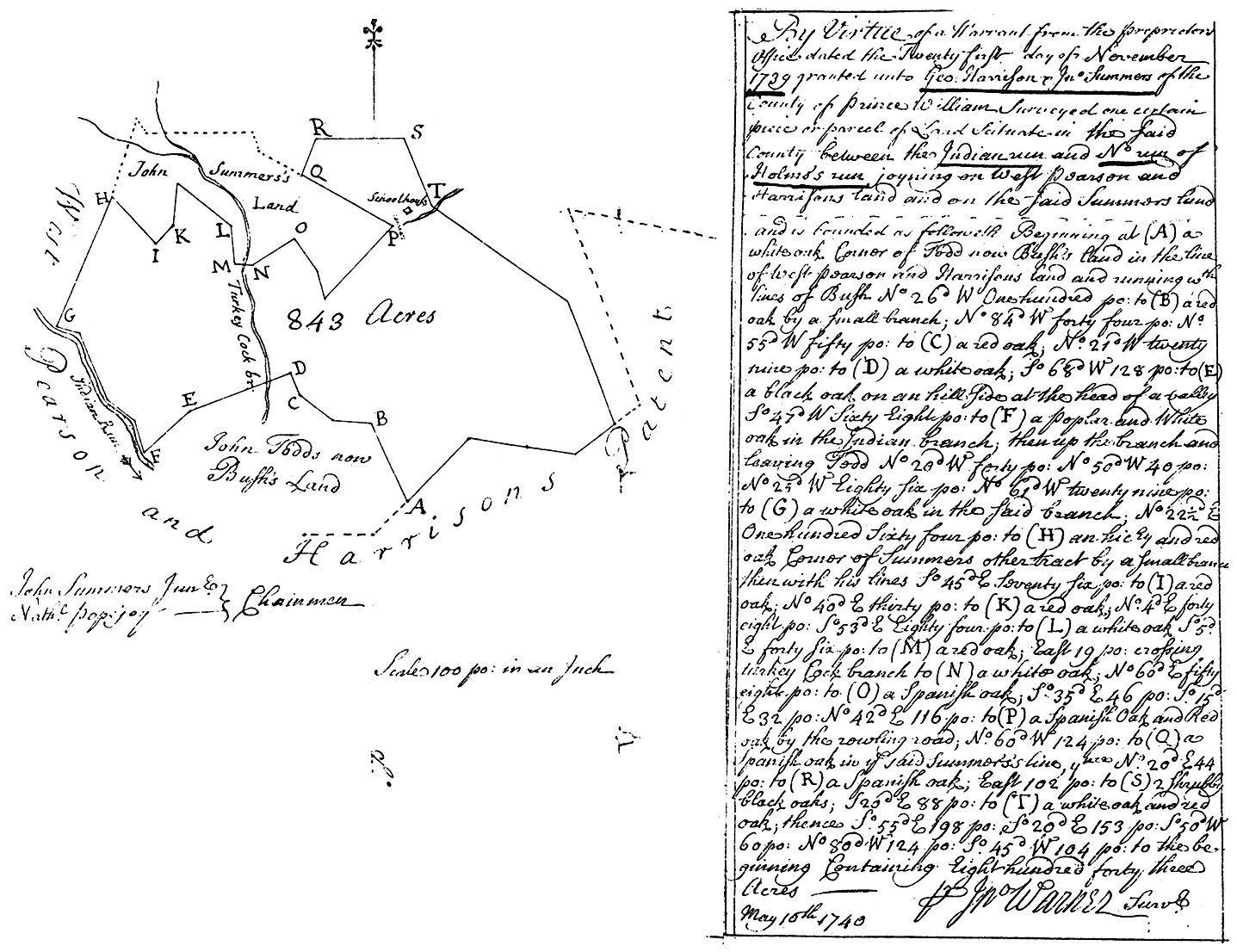
1740 survey map of the area including present-day Green Spring. The West, Harrison, and Pearson grants, as well as Turkey Cock Run, are visible

The land that Green Spring occupies was first recorded as part of a 4,639 acres (1,877 ha) land grant in 1706 by Thomas Fairfax, 5th Lord Fairfax of Cameron to John West, William Harrison, Thomas Harrison, and Thomas Pearson. Originally part of the Fairfax family's Northern Neck Proprietary land grant prior to its sale, this landowning was passed through the descendents of the original owners until John Moss, a justice in the Fairfax County court and commissioner of revenue, purchased 1,200 acres (490 ha) on September 11, 1777. A 2007 dendrochronological study dated the construction of the Green Spring house to 1784.

Moss grew crops including tobacco, corn, and wheat. Beyond agriculture, Moss, who was a leader in Fairfax County's early Methodist Church, also hosted Methodist meetings and preachers at Green Spring through the 1770s and 1780s. During the American Revolutionary War, Moss served as a captain in the Continental Army, after which he remained active in Fairfax County affairs in various municipal positions.

By the late 18th century, he had also transitioned away from tobacco agriculture and towards cultivation of grains, which were less labor intensive; this, along with post-revolutionary idealism, motivated Moss to grant delayed manumission to 14 enslaved persons at Green Spring in 1795. Following Moss's death in 1809, ownership of the Green Spring property passed to his sons William and Thomas, who both continued to farm the land with enslaved labor. Thomas also served on the Board of Directors for the Little River Turnpike, which was completed near Green Spring in 1806.

=== 1840–1900 ===
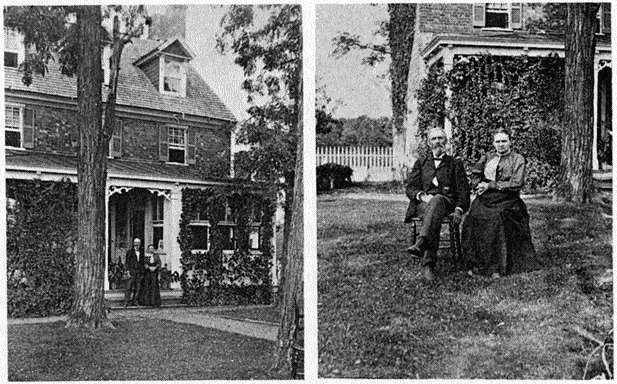
Fountain Beattie and his wife, Annie Hathaway Beattie, at Green Spring, c. 1885

Green Spring was sold out of the Moss family in 1839 to James Sherrif, who owned it until 1855, when he sold it to Hannah O'Brien as a part of a debt settlement. O'Brien then owned Green Spring throughout the American Civil War; she eventually sold it in 1878 to Fountain Beattie, a Confederate veteran who was part of John S. Mosby's Raiders. Beattie grew fruits and vegetables, distilled brandy in the property's spring house, and operated a dairy farm. His farm, which was successful into the 1890s, was ultimately undermined by a devastating barn fire.

=== 20th century and conversion to park ===
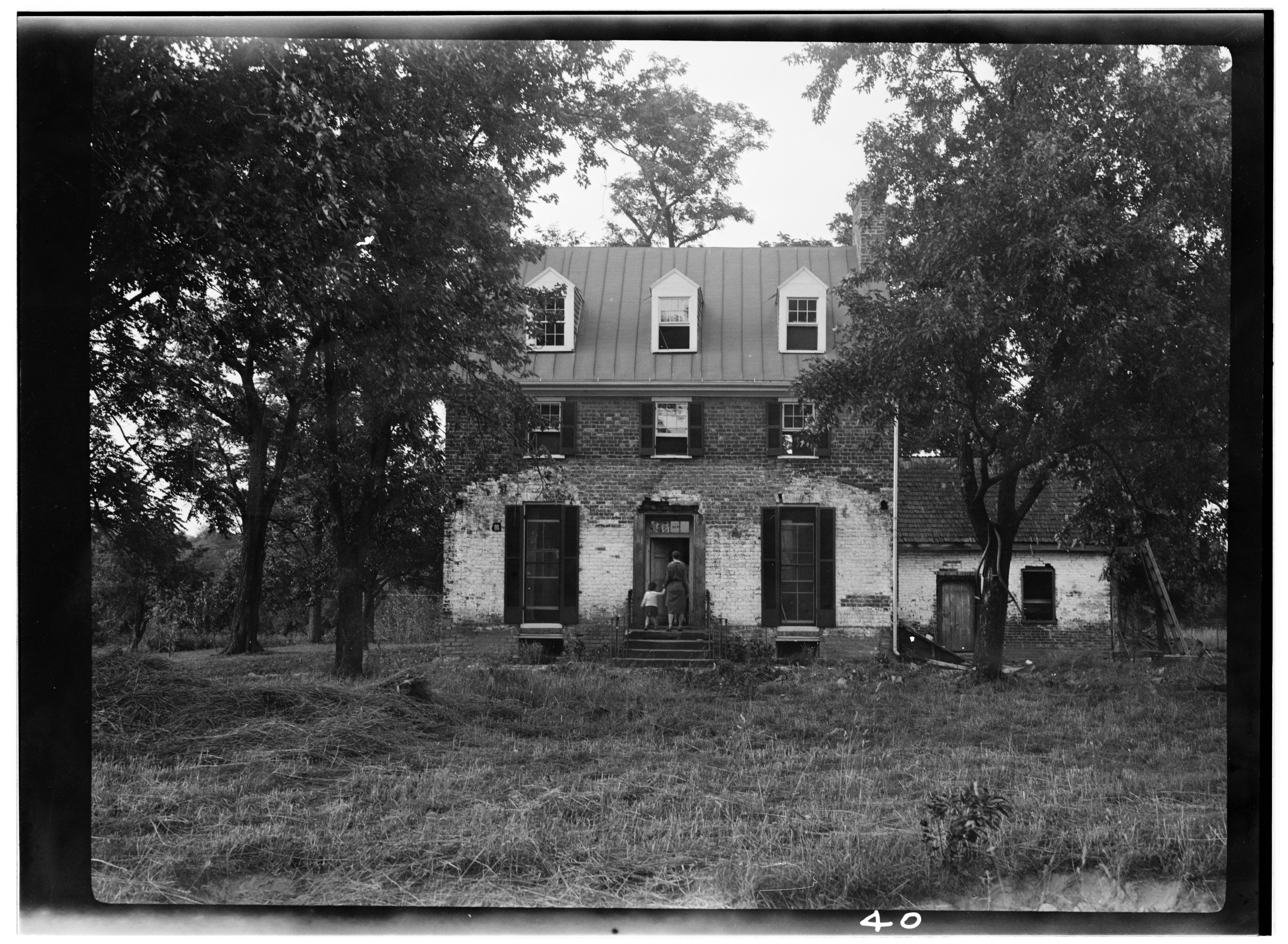
Green Spring prior to its renovation by the Straight family, 1930s

Beattie sold Green Spring in 1917 to George R. Sims, a resident of Florida. The property then passed through several owners. When Minnie Whitesell purchased it in 1931, she invested in the restoration of the Green Spring house and subdivided the surrounding land. Michael Straight, a publisher and editor of The New Republic, and his wife Belinda, bought Green Spring from Whitesell in 1941. The Straights then engaged in a major renovation of the entire Green Spring property beginning in 1942, which included the addition of a two-story west wing to the main house, an expansion of the spring house, and a complete redesign of its agricultural landscape into a series of gardens.

The Straight's alterations followed the Colonial Revival style and were designed by Beatrix Farrand, a landscape architect and one of the founding members of the American Society of Landscape Architects, and Walter Macomber, the former resident architect at Colonial Williamsburg. During their ownership, the Straight family hosted many intellectual and political figures at Green Spring, including Aldous Huxley, U.S. Supreme Court Justice Hugo Black, and Hubert Humphrey.

The Straights donated over 18 acres (7.3 ha) of their Green Spring property to Fairfax County in October 1970 for use as a public park. This parcel incorporated the 18th century main house, springhouse, ponds, and Farrand's landscaping. The Fairfax County Park Authority then acquired two adjacent lots that expanded the planned park by over 10 acres (4.0 ha). Fairfax County executed on the park's first master plan in 1977 that called for the construction of a horticultural center and demonstration gardens; these were completed by 1982. Further enhancements included a complete renovation of the Green Spring house in 1994, during which woodwork by Macomber was temporarily deconstructed to allow the installation of steel beams that now support the house's second and third stories, additions to the horticultural center in 1995, and more land purchases in the 2000s that increased the park's size to 31 acres (13 ha). In 2003, the main house, historic outbuildings, and landscaping were added to the National Register of Historic Places in recognition of Ferrand and Macomber's Colonial Revival architectural contributions and Green Spring's status as one of the few remaining late-18th century homes in Fairfax County.

== Architecture ==
=== Buildings ===
The main house's original 18th-century section is its central, 2 1/2-story portion. The exterior retains original Colonial architectural characteristics such as its Flemish bond brickwork. The first and second floors originally had central hallways, with doorways to rooms on either side that were served by end wall chimneys. Multiple owners have extensively remodeled the building, including Fountain Beattie's addition of its dormers and a since-removed front porch. The Straight family commissioned some of the most significant changes during the house's 1940s Colonial Revival renovation, when Macomber installed panels and cupboards made from wood reclaimed from an 18th-century Maryland tavern, removed load-bearing walls to create the current dining room and library, and made basement alterations that allowed for heating and air conditioning.

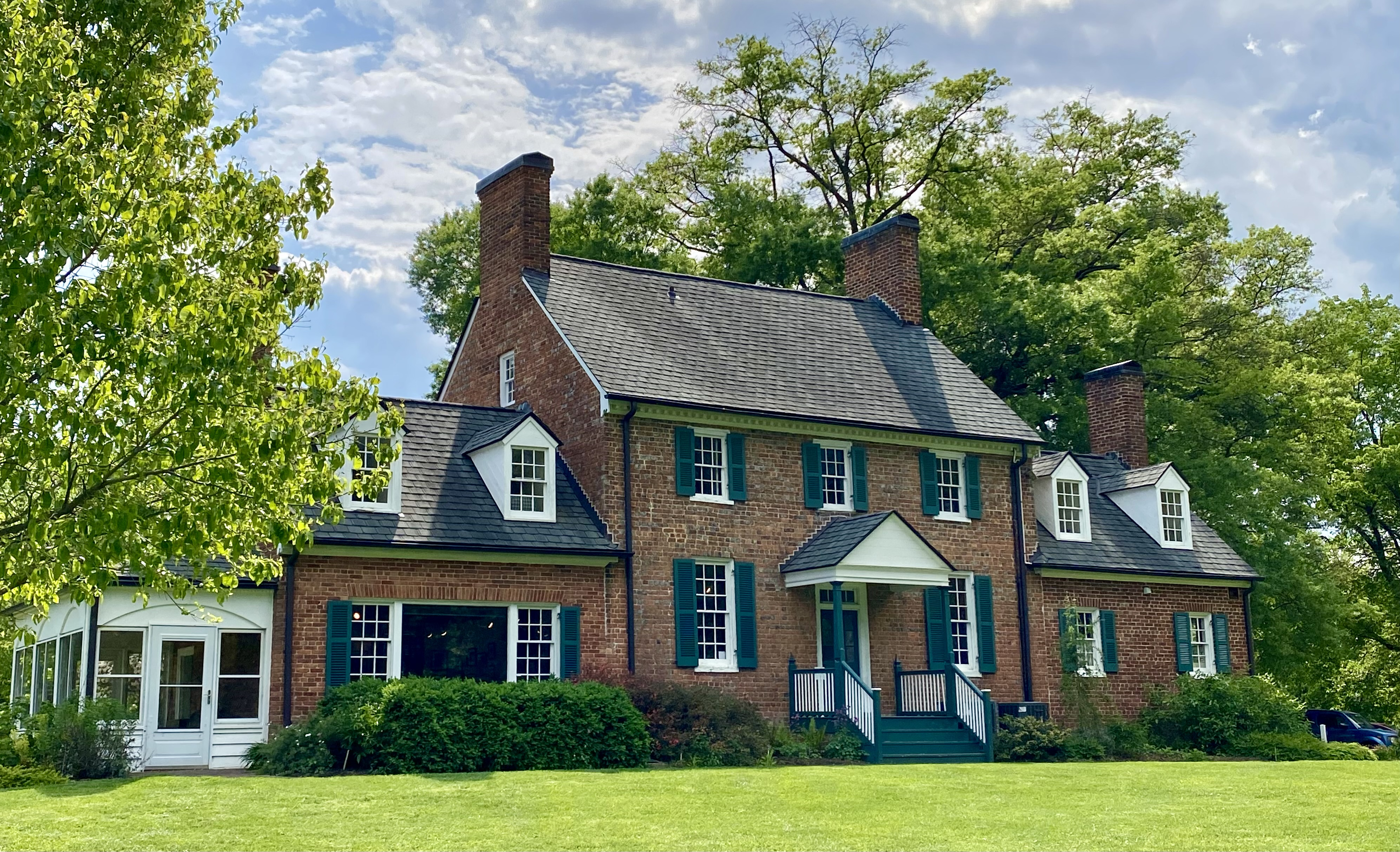
Green Spring rear elevation, c. 1777 with later additions and modifications

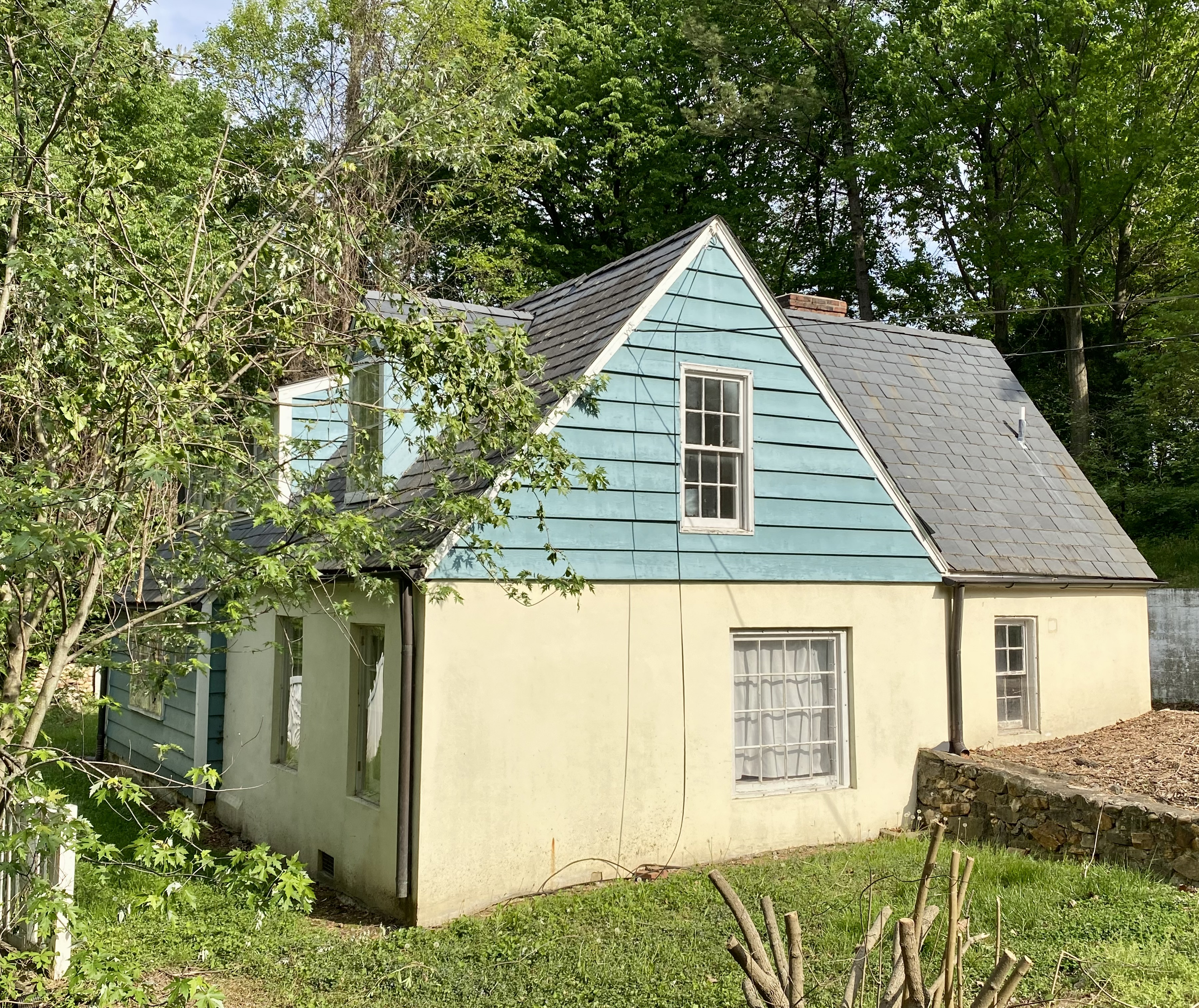
Spring house c. 1838

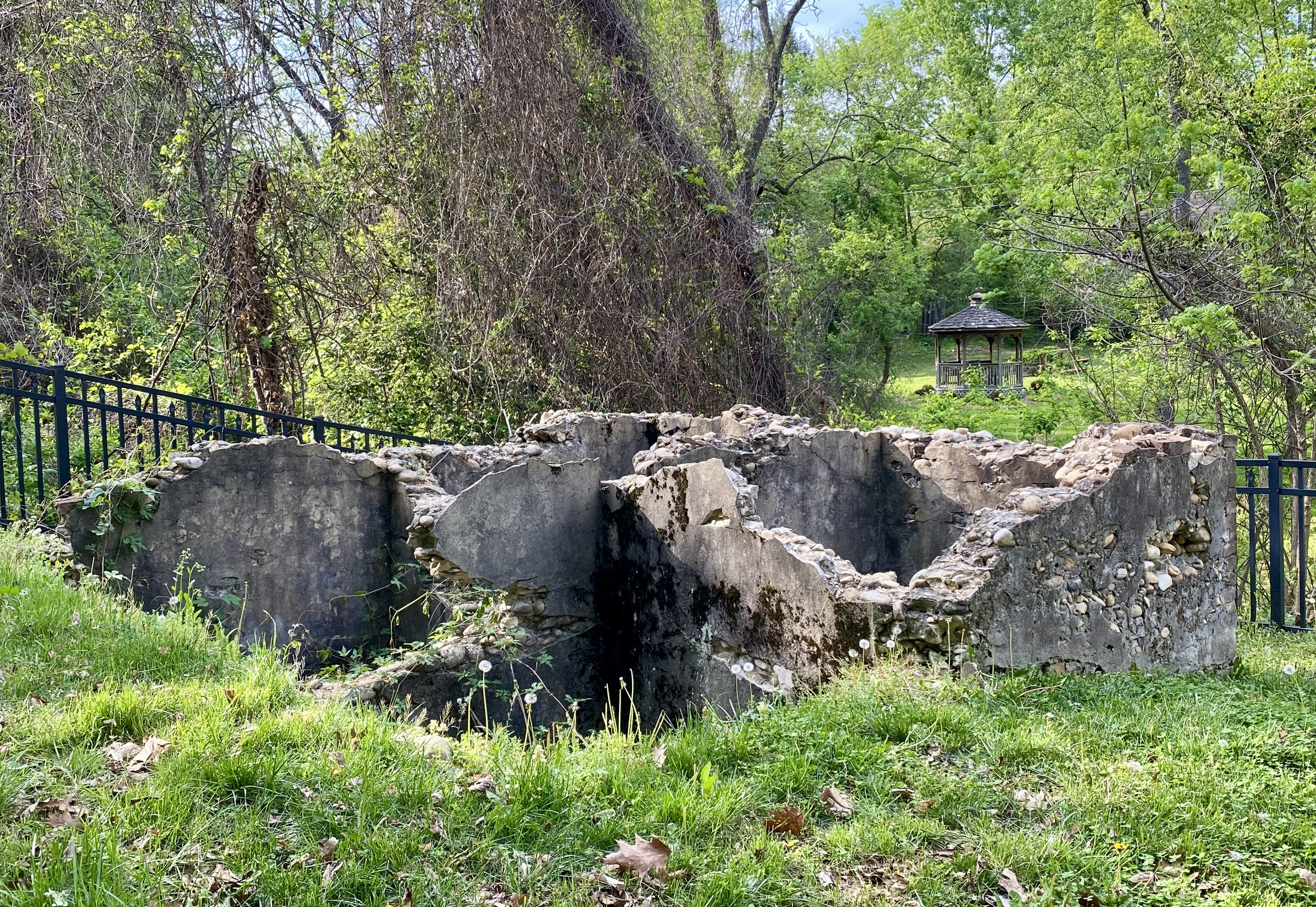
Stone building ruins, 19th century

The property has a spring house that dates to at least 1838. Originally made of stone and built into a hill, the Straights had Macomber convert it into a living space for their gardener and housekeeper; the rear of the house was exposed after the hill was cut back. It also contains 1940s woodwork by Macomber. Other structures and features at Green Spring include a cemetery from the early 19th century, the archeological remains of an 18th-century exterior kitchen building, an underground brick vault, and the ruins of a 19th-century stone building near the spring house.

=== Landscape ===
Green Spring's landscape, which was designed by Beatrix Farrand, is mostly intact based on Farrand's original plan, and represents one of her few surviving residential gardens. The front of the property has cedar and hardwood trees that conceal the house from nearby roads, as well as a low stone wall that provides further separation from Little River Turnpike. The rear has a semi-circular formal garden with a lawn, boxwood hedges, hemlocks, and white pine. Beyond the hedges are garden rooms with azaleas, more hemlocks, and a sycamore tree. This gives way to a forested area that follows Turkey Cock Run, a local stream. Two man made ponds are adjacent to the stream; these may have originally been mill ponds, which Michael Straight had his gardener restore.

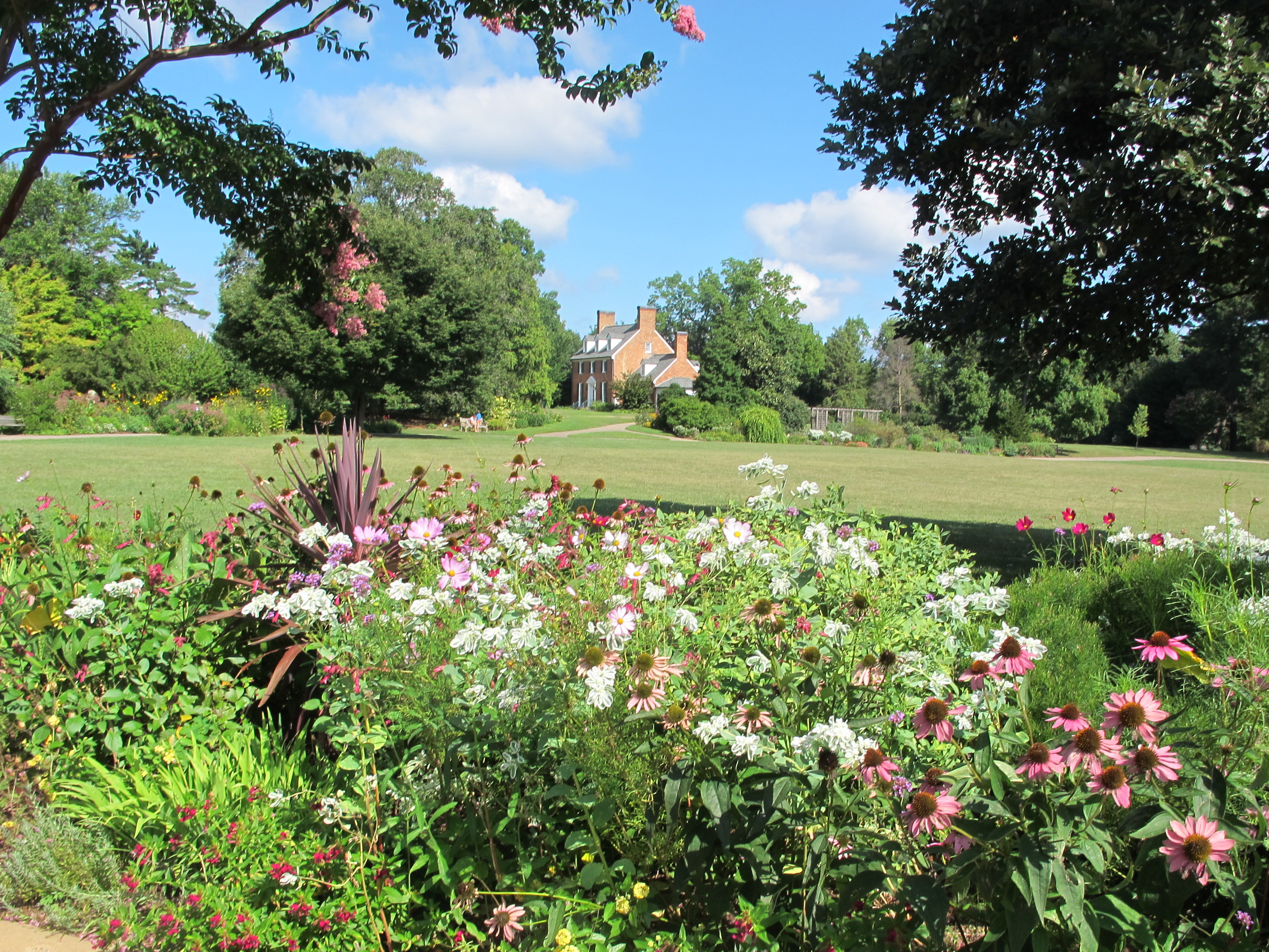
Gardens and lawn

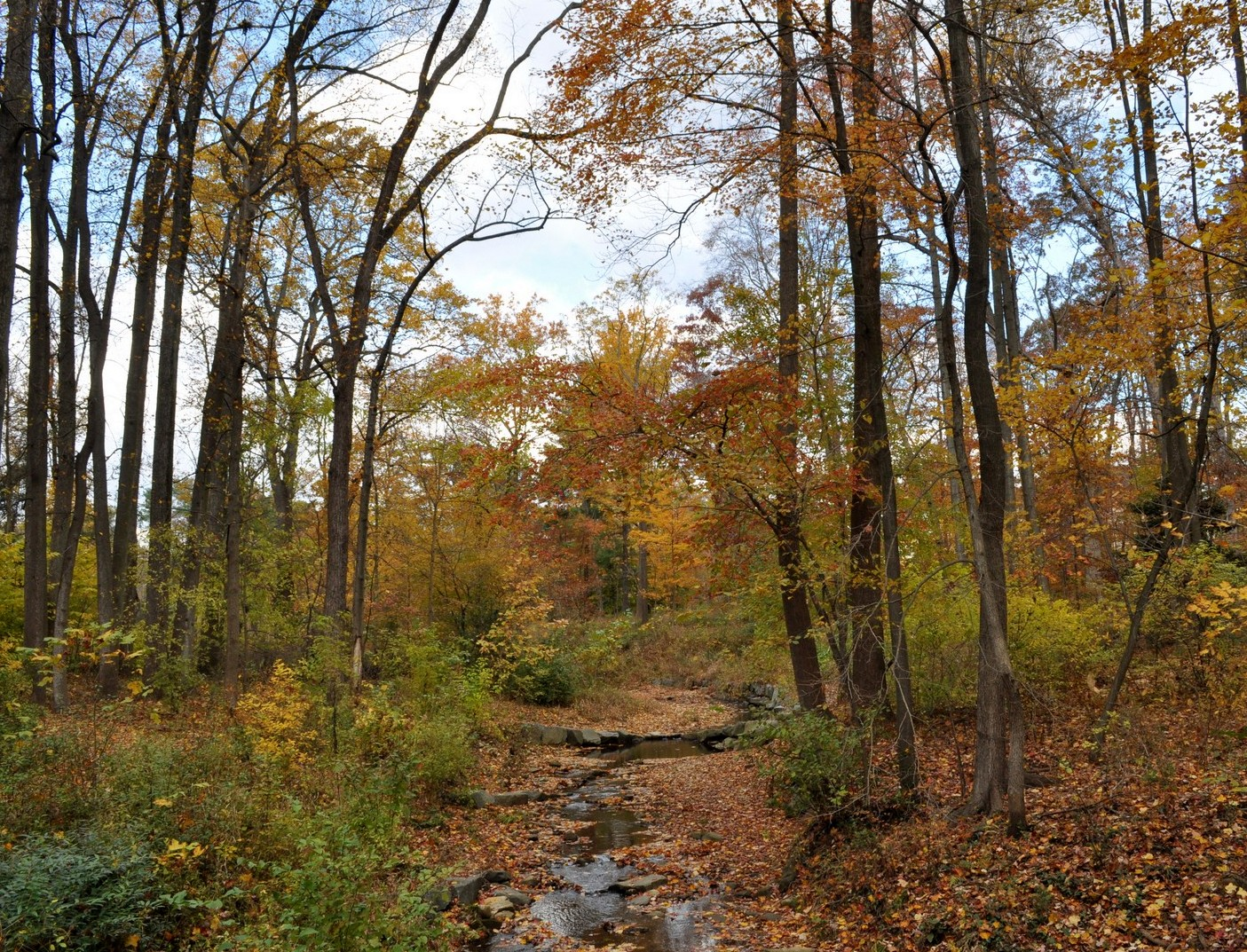
Turkey Cock Run and forest in the fall

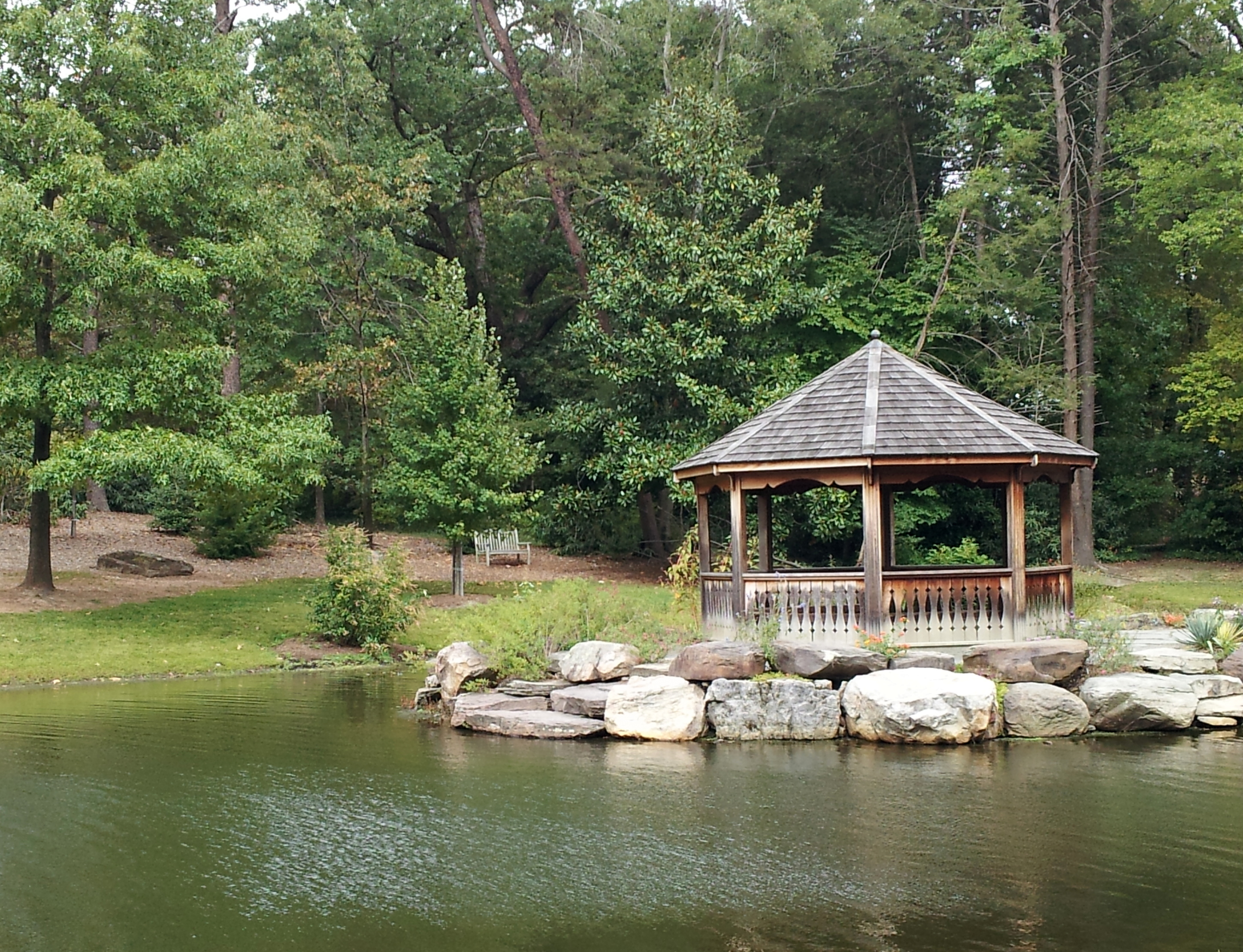
Gazebo and pond

== Park amenities ==
Green Spring Gardens covers 31 acres (13 ha) and has demonstration gardens, a greenhouse, a horticultural library, nature trails, and gift stores. Park staff offer educational programs in gardening and tours of Green Spring's historic resources. The main house has been converted into a museum, as well as a space for art exhibits and events.

== Bibliography ==
- Chapman, Sherrie L. (February 28, 2003). National Register of Historic Places Registration Form – Green Spring (PDF). Alexandria, Virginia: National Park Service. Archived from the original (PDF) on May 19, 2026.
- Fairfax County Park Authority (April 27, 2016). Green Spring Gardens Master Plan Revision (PDF). Fairfax County Park Authority.
- Netherton, Ross; Netherton, Nan (June 1970). Green Spring Farm (eBook ed.). Fairfax, Virginia: Fairfax County History Commission.
