= Oswald Tippo =

American botanist and educator

1st Chancellor of the University of Massachusetts Amherst
- In office 1970–1971
- Preceded by: Office established
- Succeeded by: Randolph Bromery

Personal details
- Born: November 27, 1911 Milo, Maine, U.S.
- Died: June 10, 1999 (aged 87) Santa Barbara, California, U.S.
- Education: University of Massachusetts Amherst; Harvard University
- Profession: Botanist; Educator

Oswald Tippo (November 27, 1911 – June 10, 1999) was an American botanist and educator. Tippo became the first chancellor of the University of Massachusetts Amherst in 1970.

== Career ==
Born in Milo, Tippo moved to Boston a year later, and graduated from Jamaica Plain High School in 1928. He received his Bachelor of Science in botany from the University of Massachusetts Amherst (1932) and his Master of Science (1933) and Doctor of Philosophy from Harvard University (1937). He was also awarded an honorary Doctor of Science from the University of Massachusetts Amherst (1954). Tippo was a member of the Phi Beta Kappa and Sigma Xi honor societies.

Upon graduating from Harvard, Tippo joined the faculty at the University of Illinois Urbana-Champaign. From 1943 to 1945, he worked as a biologist at the Philadelphia Naval Shipyard. In 1949, Tippo published the widely used textbook College Botany with Harry J. Fuller. From 1951 to 1953, he served as editor of the American Journal of Botany. In 1955, he moved to Yale University as Eaton Professor of Botany, Director of the Marsh Botanical Garden, and Fellow of Berkeley College. Five years later, he was named provost of the University of Colorado, and in 1963, was named Executive Dean of Arts and Sciences at New York University.

From 1964 to 1970, Tippo served as provost of the University of Massachusetts Amherst, and then became the institution's first chancellor until 1971. He is credited with initiating the construction of their W. E. B. Du Bois Library, and the library's courtyard was named in his honor on October 8, 1999. Tippo was named Commonwealth Professor of Botany from 1971 until his retirement in 1982. From 1980 to 1985, he served as editor of the journal Economic Botany.

Tippo was president of the Botanical Society of America in 1955, fellow of the American Academy of Arts and Sciences, member of the American Association for the Advancement of Science, and member of the American Institute of Biological Science.

== Awards ==
- 1980 - Botanical Society of America Merit Award
- 1999 - Siegfried Feller Award for Outstanding Volunteer Service
