= Mary Helen Goldsmith =

American plant physiologist (1933–2024)

- Born: May 2, 1933; Boston, Massachusetts, U.S.
- Died: October 2, 2024 (aged 91); Hamden, Connecticut, U.S.
- Education: Radcliffe College
- Scientific career
- Thesis: Characteristics of the translocation of indoleacetic acid in the coleoptile of Avena (1960)

Mary Helen Goldsmith (née Martin; May 2, 1933 – October 2, 2024) was an American plant physiologist known for her work on how hormones impact plant growth. She was a fellow and past president of the American Society of Plant Physiologists.

== Life and career ==
Goldsmith had a B.A. from Cornell University. She earned her Ph.D. in 1960 from Radcliffe College where she researched the importance of indole acetic acid in the grass, Avena. In 1963 she joined the faculty at Yale University where she worked until her retirement in 2006.

Goldsmith was the director of the Marsh Botanical Garden for sixteen years and included visits to the garden in some of her classes. She also served as the president of the American Society of Plant Physiologists.

Goldsmith died in Hamden, Connecticut, on October 2, 2024, at the age of 91.

== Research ==
Goldsmith's early work was on impact of oxygen on insects. During her Ph.D., she began to examine the movement of auxins, such as indole acetic acid, into corn. She particularly focused on the polar diffusion of auxins. Her research extends to studies on changes in plant cells during transport of polar chemicals, intracellular measurements of membrane potential, and activation of potassium channels.

== Selected publications ==
- Goldsmith, M H M (June 1977). "The Polar Transport of Auxin". Annual Review of Plant Physiology. 28 (1): 439–478. doi:10.1146/annurev.pp.28.060177.002255.
- Bates, George W.; Goldsmith, Mary Helen M. (November 1983). "Rapid response of the plasma-membrane potential in oat coleoptiles to auxin and other weak acids". Planta. 159 (3): 231–237. Bibcode:1983Plant.159..231B. doi:10.1007/BF00397530. PMID 24258173. S2CID 5053291.
- Goldsmith, Mary Helen M. (1967-05-05). "Separation of Transit of Auxin from Uptake: Average Velocity and Reversible Inhibition by Anaerobic Conditions". Science. 156 (3775): 661–663. Bibcode:1967Sci...156..661G. doi:10.1126/science.156.3775.661. PMID 6023663. S2CID 36008743.
- Goldsmith, M H M (June 1968). "The Transport of Auxin". Annual Review of Plant Physiology. 19 (1): 347–360. doi:10.1146/annurev.pp.19.060168.002023.
- Goldsmith, Mary Helen M.; Goldsmith, Timothy H.; Martin, Monroe H. (1 February 1981). "Mathematical analysis of the chemosmotic polar diffusion of auxin through plant tissues". Proceedings of the National Academy of Sciences. 78 (2): 976–980. Bibcode:1981PNAS...78..976G. doi:10.1073/pnas.78.2.976. ISSN 0027-8424. PMC 319928. PMID 16592983.

== Awards and honors ==
- 1986 - Goldsmith received a Guggenheim Fellowship in plant sciences.
- 2007 - Goldsmith was named a fellow of the American Society of Plant Biologists.
- Goldsmith has been recognized as a Pioneer Member of the American Society of Plant Biologists.
