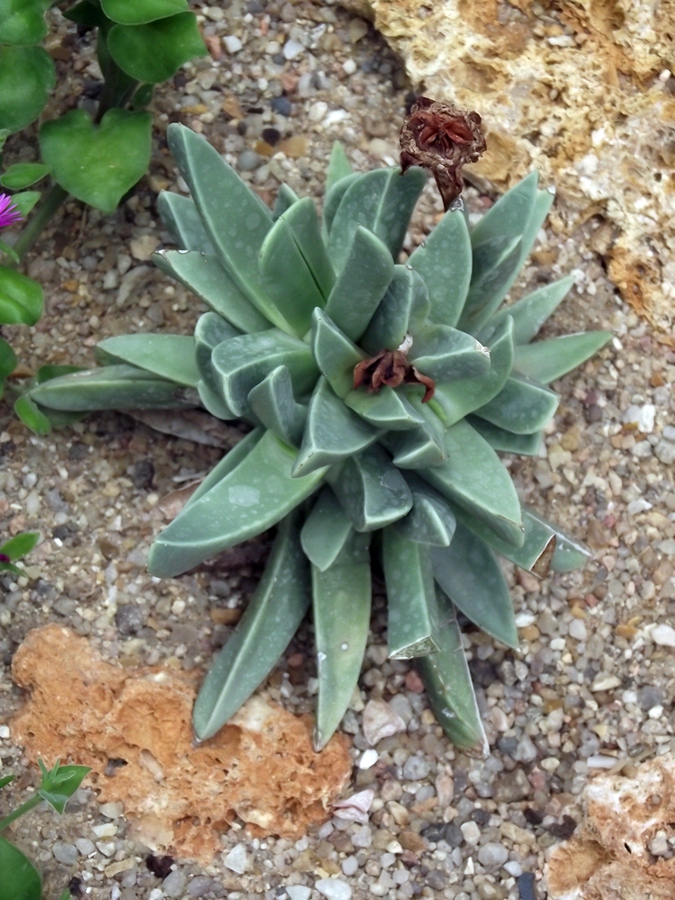
- Machairophyllum bijlii, after its flowers have dried out

Scientific classification
- Kingdom: Plantae
- Clade: Tracheophytes
- Clade: Angiosperms
- Clade: Eudicots
- Order: Caryophyllales
- Family: Aizoaceae
- Subfamily: Ruschioideae
- Tribe: Ruschieae
- Genus: Machairophyllum; Schwantes

Species
- See text

Synonyms
- Perissolobus N.E.Br.

= Machairophyllum =

Genus of succulents

Machairophyllum is a genus of plants in the family Aizoaceae. It includes four species native to the Cape Provinces of South Africa.

== Species ==
As of October 2025, Plants of the World Online accepted the following species:

- Machairophyllum albidum Schwantes
- Machairophyllum bijlii (N.E.Br.) L.Bolus
- Machairophyllum brevifolium L.Bolus
- Machairophyllum stayneri L.Bolus
