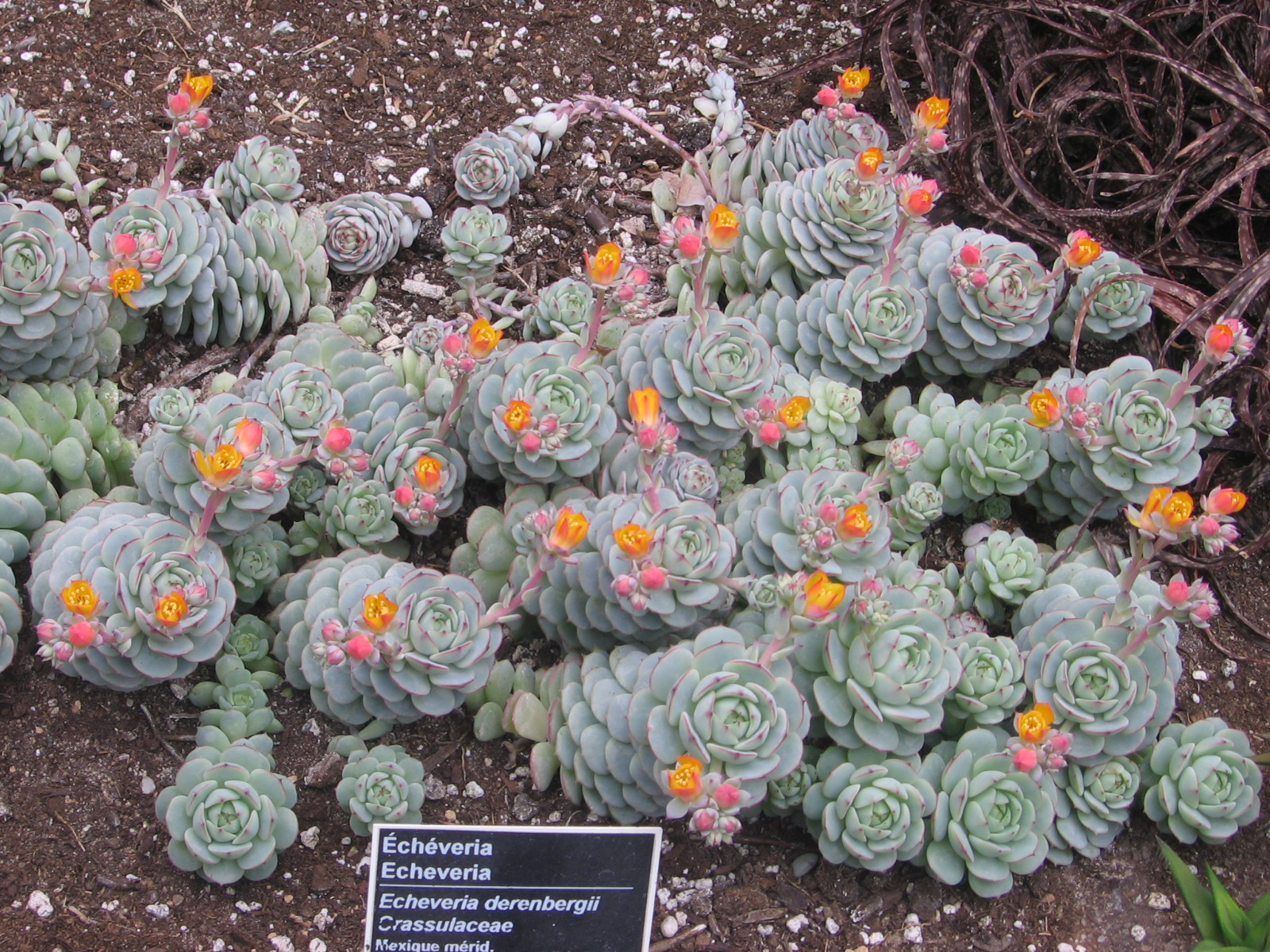
- E. derenbergii, Montreal Botanical Garden

Scientific classification
- Kingdom: Plantae
- Clade: Tracheophytes
- Clade: Angiosperms
- Clade: Eudicots
- Order: Saxifragales
- Family: Crassulaceae
- Genus: Echeveria
- Species: E. derenbergii

Binomial name
- Echeveria derenbergii J.A.Purpus

= Echeveria derenbergii =

Species of succulent

Echeveria derenbergii, the painted-lady, is a species of flowering plant in the family Crassulaceae, endemic to eastern Oaxaca in Mexico.

== Description ==
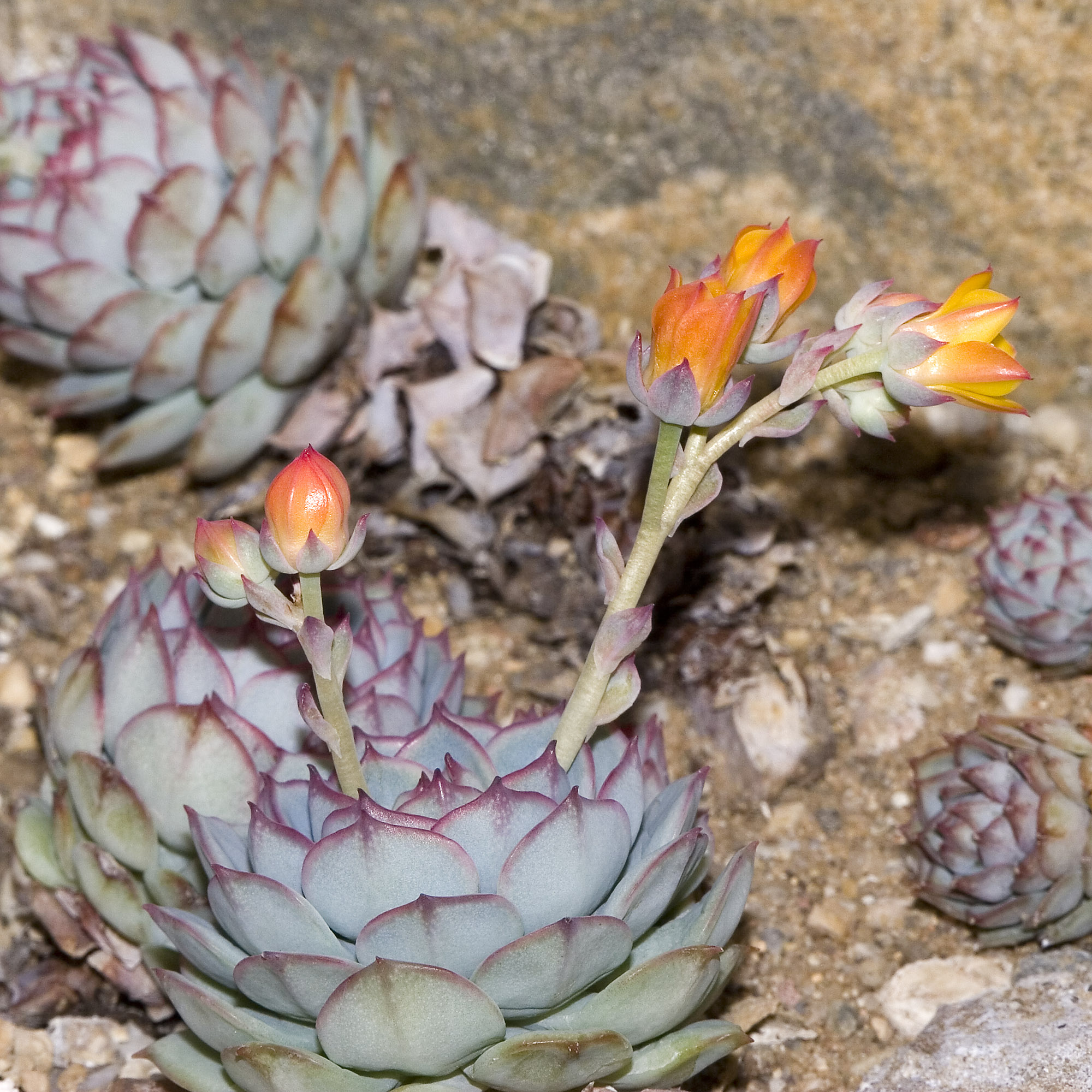
Close up of the flowers

Echeveria derenbergii is an evergreen perennial succulent, growing to 10 cm (4 in), with a dense basal rosette of pagoda-shaped, frosted, bristle-tipped, fleshy leaves. It bears racemes of bell-shaped yellow flowers with "painted" red tips in winter.

== Cultivation ==
Echeveria derenbergii is cultivated as an ornamental plant for rock gardens and as a potted plant. Like other species of Echeveria, it produces a colony of small offsets which can be separated from the parent plant.

In cooler temperate regions, it requires winter protection, as it does not tolerate temperatures below −7 °C (19 °F); but it may be placed outside in a sheltered spot during summer months. It has gained the Royal Horticultural Society's Award of Garden Merit.

== Etymology ==
Echeveria is named after Atanasio Echeverría y Godoy, a botanical illustrator who contributed to Flora Mexicana.
