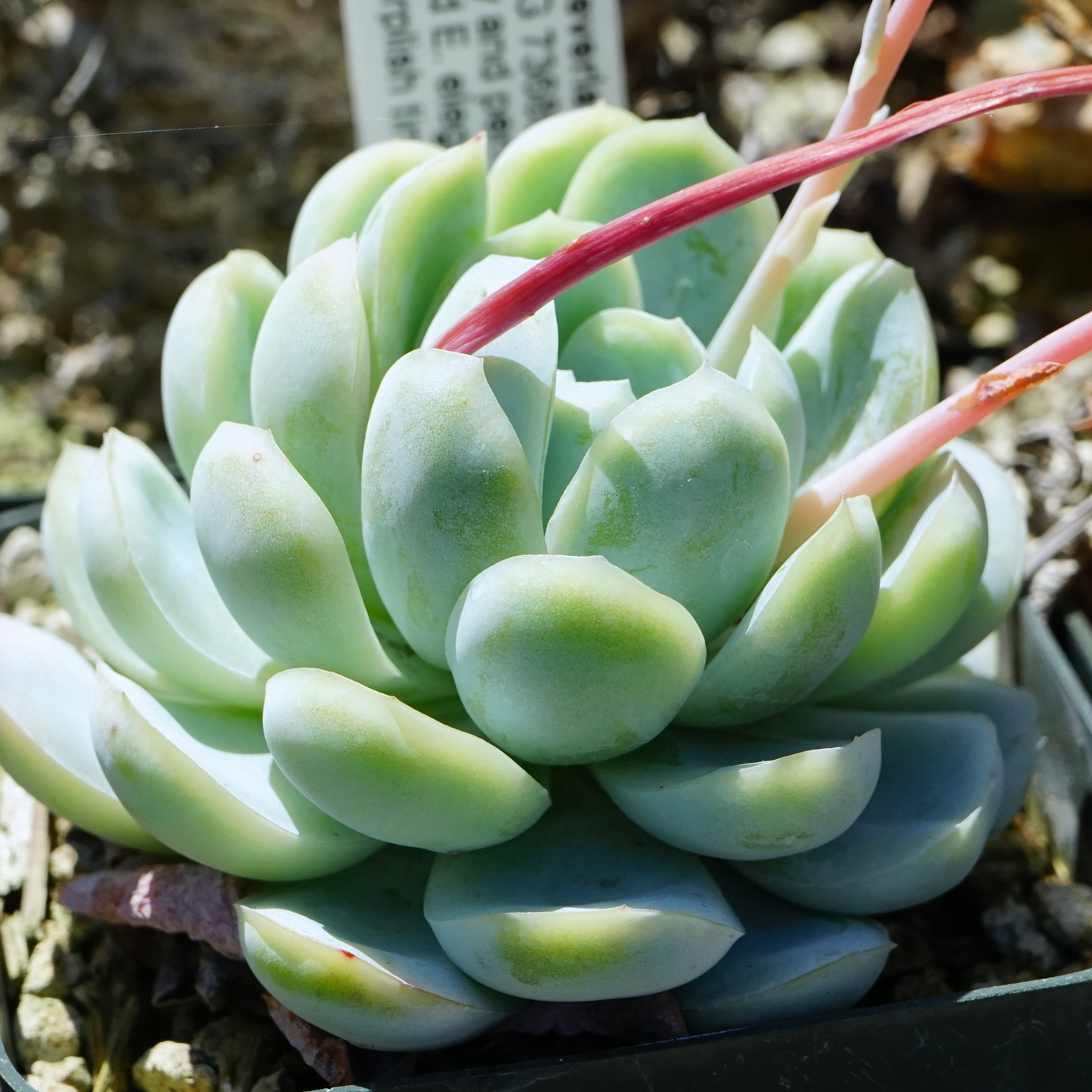

Scientific classification
- Kingdom: Plantae
- Clade: Tracheophytes
- Clade: Angiosperms
- Clade: Eudicots
- Order: Saxifragales
- Family: Crassulaceae
- Genus: Echeveria
- Species: E. elegans

Binomial name
- Echeveria elegans Rose

Synonyms
- Oliverella elegans Rose, 1903

= Echeveria elegans =

Species of succulent

Echeveria elegans, the Mexican snow ball, God's Throne, Mexican gem or white Mexican rose is a species of flowering plant in the family Crassulaceae, native to semi-desert habitats in Mexico.

== Description ==
Echeveria elegans is a succulent evergreen perennial that grows to a height of 5–10 cm (2–4 inches) and a width of 50 cm (20 inches). It features compact rosettes of pale green-blue, fleshy leaves and produces slender, 25 cm (10 inches) long pink stalks with pink flowers that have yellow tips, typically blooming in winter and spring.

== Cultivation ==
Echeveria elegans is cultivated as an ornamental plant for rock gardens planting, or as a potted plant. It thrives in subtropical climates, such as Southern California.

It has gained the Royal Horticultural Society's Award of Garden Merit.

Like others of its kind, it produces multiple offsets which can be separated from the parents in spring, and grown separately - hence the common name "hen and chicks", applied to several species within the genus Echeveria.

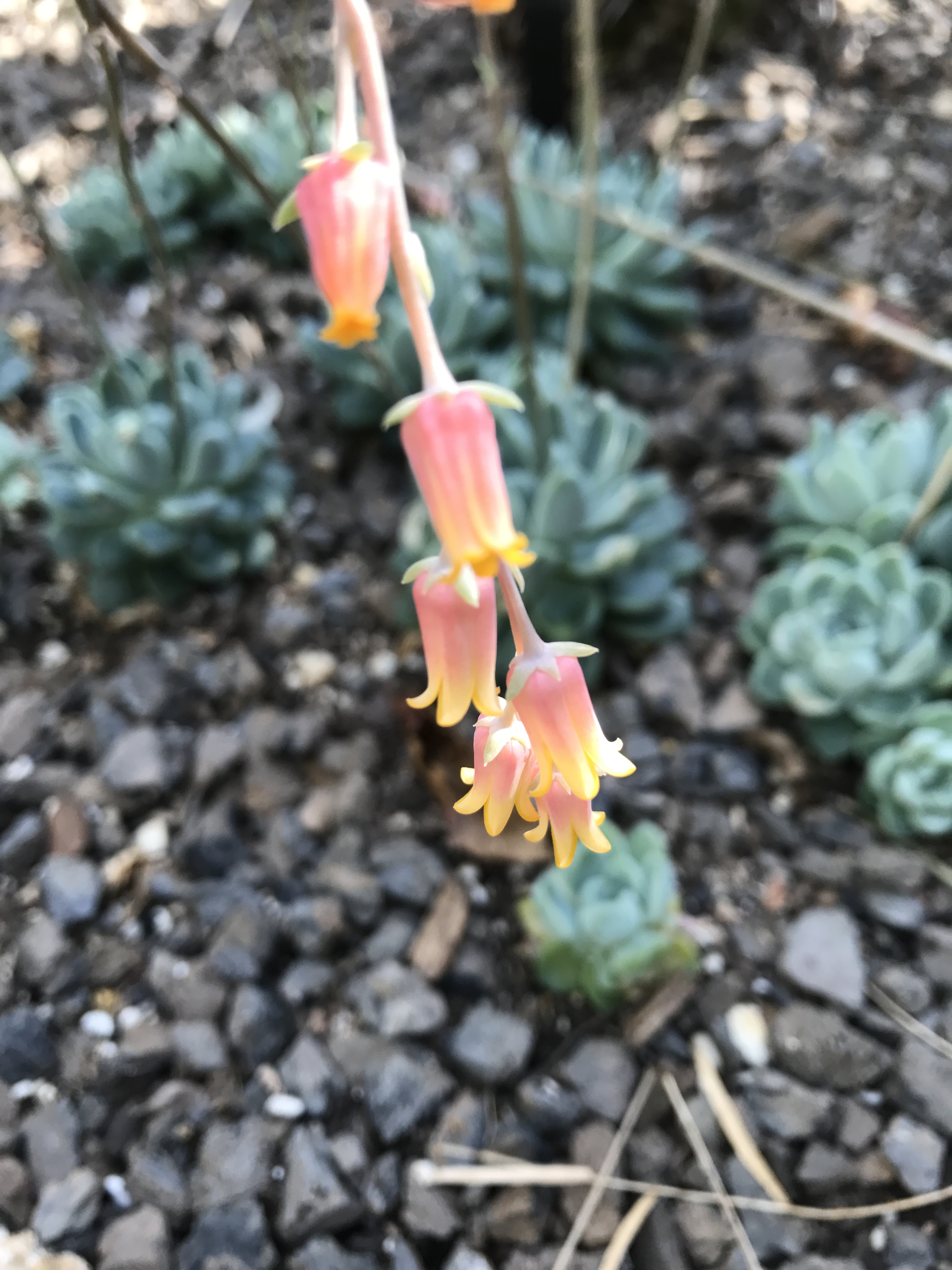
Flowers of echeveria elegans.

== Etymology ==
Echeveria is named for Atanasio Echeverría y Godoy, a botanical illustrator who contributed to Flora Mexicana.

Elegans means 'elegant' or 'graceful'.
