= Beatrix Farrand =

American landscape architect (1872–1959)

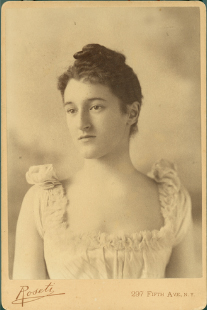
- Born: Beatrix Cadwalader Jones; June 19, 1872; New York City, U.S.
- Died: February 28, 1959 (aged 86); Bar Harbor, Maine, U.S.
- Education: Arnold Arboretum, Columbia School of Mines
- Occupation: Architect
- Spouse: Max Farrand (m. 1913; died 1945)
- Parent(s): Mary Cadwalader Rawle; Frederic Rhinelander Jones
- Projects: Dumbarton Oaks, Abby Aldrich Rockefeller Garden

External videos
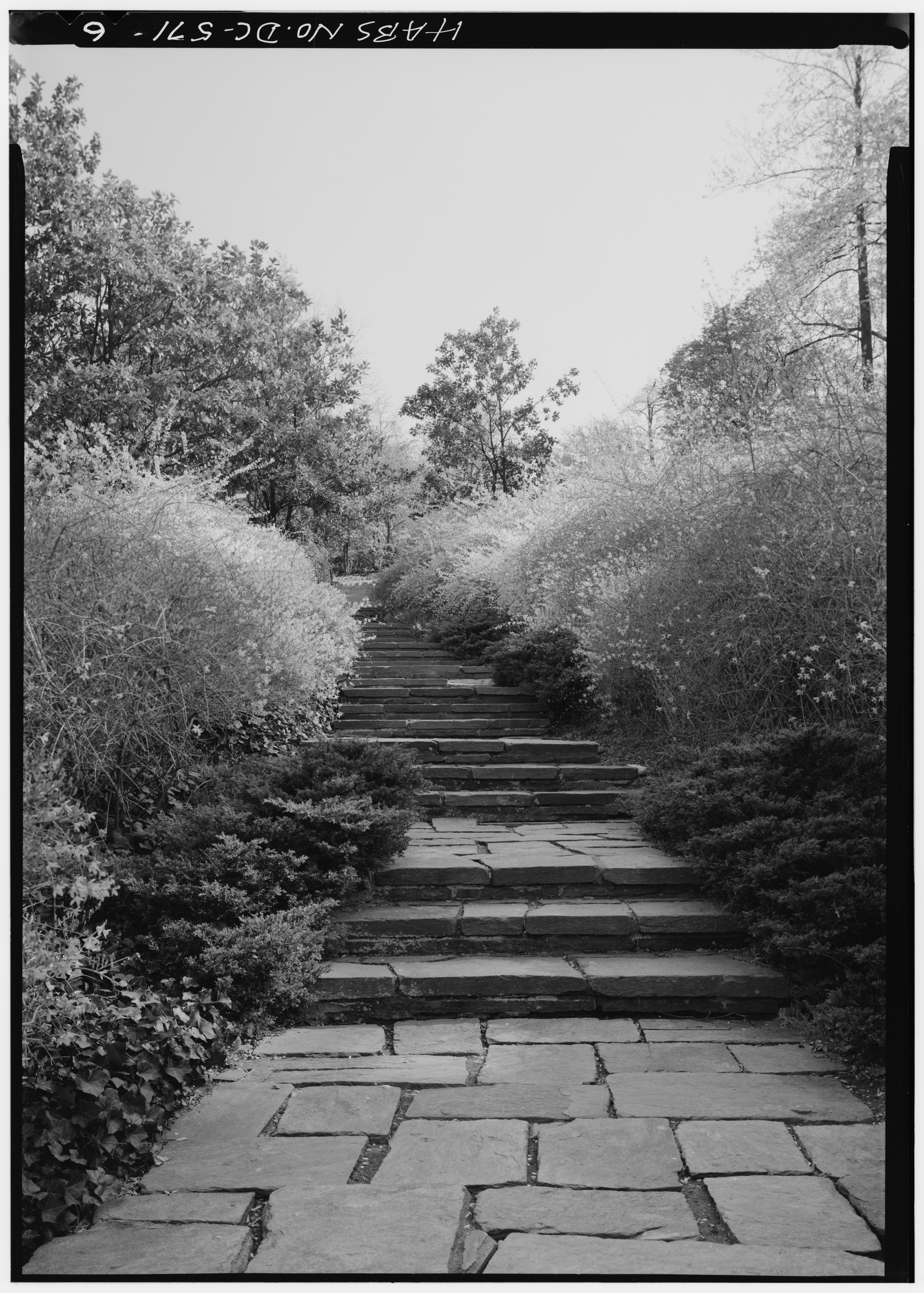
- Beatrix Farrand Tribute Film, Connecticut Women's Hall of Fame
- Big Ideas for Small Spaces – The Beatrix Farrand Garden at Bellefield, Gardening the Hudson Valley

Beatrix Cadwalader Farrand (née Jones; June 19, 1872 – February 28, 1959) was an American landscape gardener and landscape architect. Her career included commissions to design about 110 gardens for private residences, estates and country homes, public parks, botanic gardens, college campuses, and the White House. Only a few of her major works survive: Dumbarton Oaks in Washington, D.C., the Abby Aldrich Rockefeller Garden on Mount Desert, Maine, the restored Farm House Garden in Bar Harbor, the Peggy Rockefeller Rose Garden at the New York Botanical Garden (constructed after Farrand's death, using her original plans, and opened in 1988), and elements of the campuses of Princeton, Yale, and Occidental.

Farrand was one of the founding eleven members, and the only woman, of the American Society of Landscape Architects. Beatrix Farrand is one of the most accomplished persons, and women, recognized in both the first decades of the landscape architecture profession and the centuries of landscape garden design arts and accomplishments.

== Early years ==
Beatrix Cadwalader Jones was born in New York City on June 19, 1872, into a family among whom she liked to claim were "five generations of gardeners." Her mother was Mary Cadwalader Rawle (1850–1923), whose father was lawyer William Henry Rawle (1823–1889). Her father was Frederic Rhinelander Jones (1846–1918), brother of novelist Edith Wharton.

She enjoyed long seasons at the family's summer home Reef Point Estate in Mount Desert Island, Maine. She was the niece of Edith Wharton and lifelong friend of Henry James, who called her 'Trix'. At age twenty, she was introduced to one of her primary mentors, the botanist Charles Sprague Sargent, who at Harvard University was both a professor of horticulture at the Bussey Institute and the founding director of the Arnold Arboretum in Boston, Massachusetts. Sargent named a species, Crataegus jonesae, in her honor, as it was she who first noticed it and brought it to his attention.

Farrand lived at Sargent's home, Holm Lea in Brookline, Massachusetts, in 1893 and studied landscape gardening, for which there was no specialized school at the time, botany, and land planning. She wanted to learn drafting to scale, elevation rendering, surveying, and engineering, and so studied at the Columbia School of Mines under the direction of Prof. William Ware. She was influenced in using native plant species from: her many successful Reef Point experiences; studying the contemporary books from the U.S. and abroad advocating the advantages of native palettes; and from visiting the influential British garden authors William Robinson at Gravetye Manor in Sussex, and Gertrude Jekyll at Munstead Wood in Surrey. Jekyll's series of thematic gardening books emphasized the importance and value of natural plantings and were influential in the U.S.

On December 17, 1913, Beatrix married Max Farrand, the accomplished historian at Stanford and Yale universities, and the first director of the Huntington Library.

== Landscape design career ==
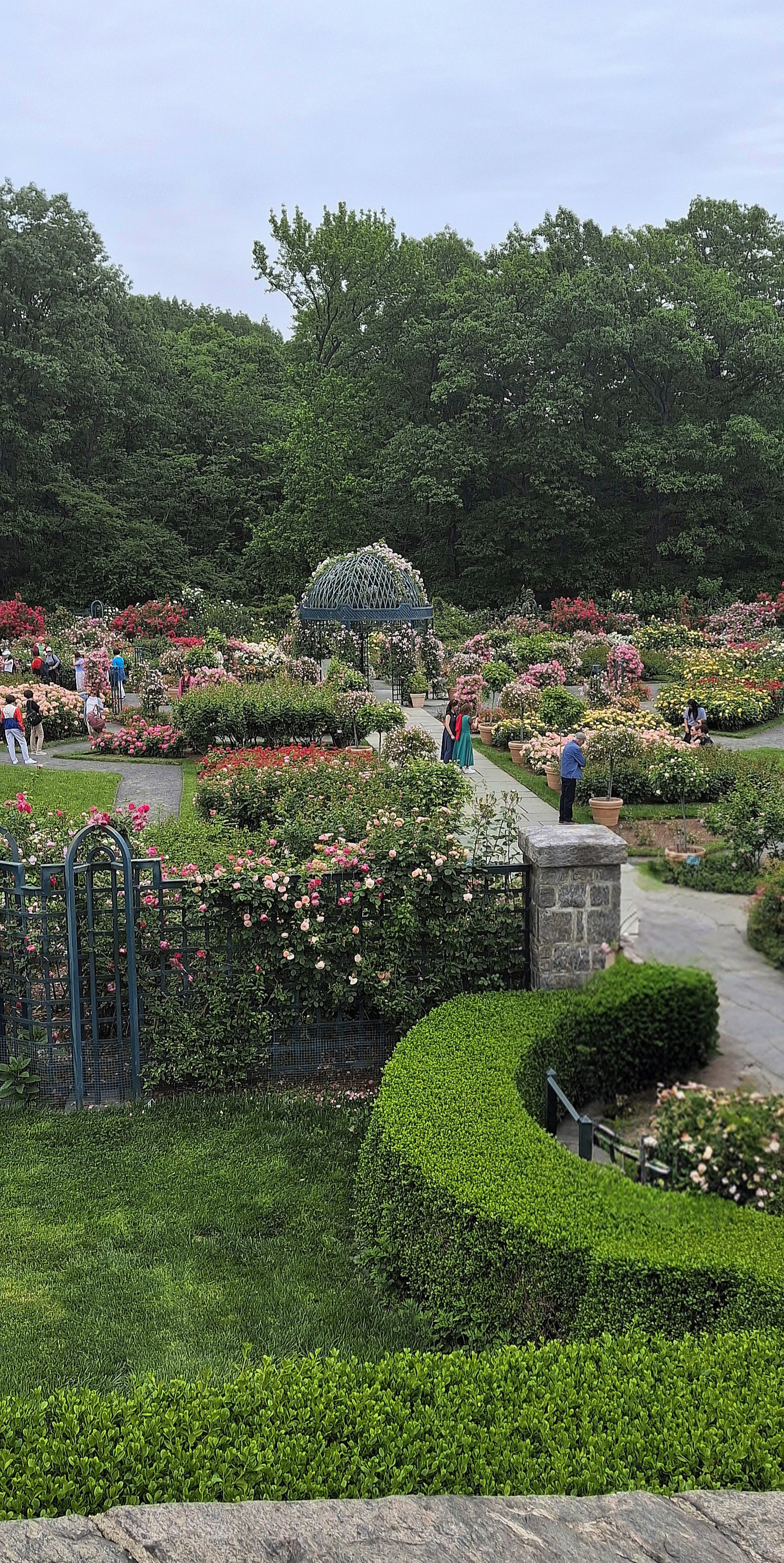
The Peggy Rockefeller Rose Garden in the New York Botanical Garden. The garden layout, including the design for a central iron-lattice gazebo and surrounding fence, was created by Beatrix Farrand in 1916. Due to iron shortages during World War I, construction of the gazebo and the fence was not completed, and the whole design was later forgotten. In the mid-1980s, NYBG Board member Beth Strauss rediscovered Farrand's original plans. David Rockefeller donated $1 million for the completion of Farrand's design, and the garden, including the gazebo and the fence, was finally realized in 1988. It was named the "Peggy Rockefeller Rose Garden" after David's wife, Margaret "Peggy" McGrath Rockefeller, who was a conservationist and NYBG Board member.

She began practicing landscape architecture in 1895, working from the upper floor of her mother's brownstone house on East Eleventh Street in New York. Since women were excluded from public projects, her first designs were residential gardens, beginning with some for neighbouring Bar Harbor residents. With the help of her mother and with her aunt Edith Wharton's social connections, she was introduced to prominent people, which led to working on a variety of significant projects. Within three years, she was so prominent in her field that she was chosen the only woman among the founders of the American Society of Landscape Architects, although she preferred the British term "landscape gardener".

Farrand did the initial site and planting planning for the National Cathedral in Washington, D.C., in 1899. In 1912, she designed the walled residential garden, Bellefield, for Mr. and Mrs. Thomas Newbold in Hyde Park, New York (now a part of the Franklin D. Roosevelt National Historic Site). In addition to being the earliest extant example of her residential designs, this exquisite walled garden, now restored, is one of the only known pairings of works by two prominent designers of that era—Farrand and the architects McKim, Mead & White — who remodeled the Newbolds' eighteenth-century house. She collaborated with the firm of McKim, Mead & White in the construction of service buildings at Dumbarton Oaks.

For the White House, the first Mrs. Woodrow Wilson, Ellen Loise Axson Wilson, had commissioned Beatrix Farrand to design the East Colonial Garden (now redesigned as the Jacqueline Kennedy Garden) and the West Garden (now the redesigned White House Rose Garden) in 1913. After Mrs. Wilson's August 1914 death, the project languished until the second Mrs. Wilson, Edith Bolling Galt Wilson, had its installation restarted and completed in 1916. She received the commission from J. Pierpont Morgan to design the grounds of Morgan's residence in New York City (later the site of the Morgan Library & Museum), and continued as a consultant for thirty years (1913–43).

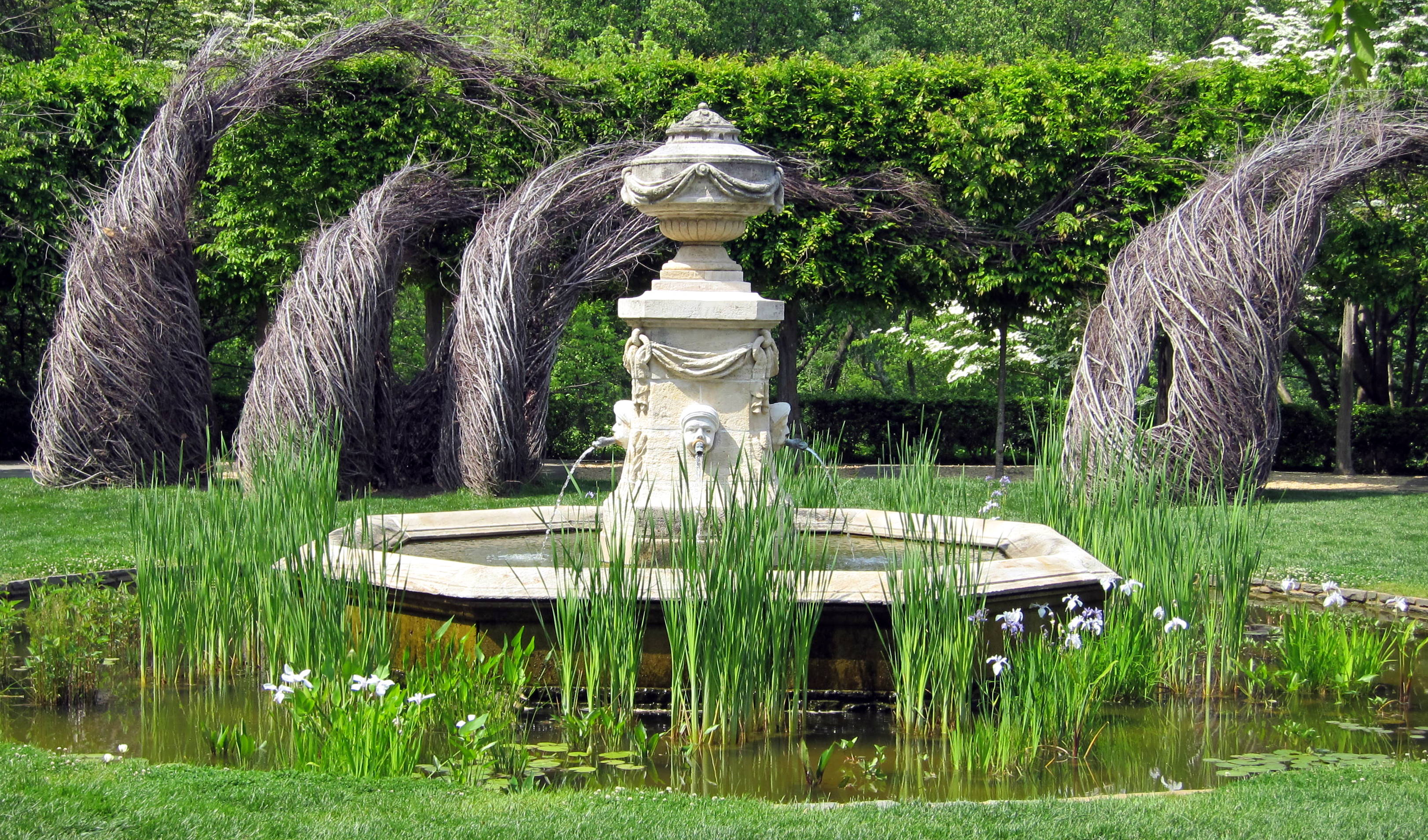
Fountain at Dumbarton Oaks in Washington, D.C., site of her best known garden design

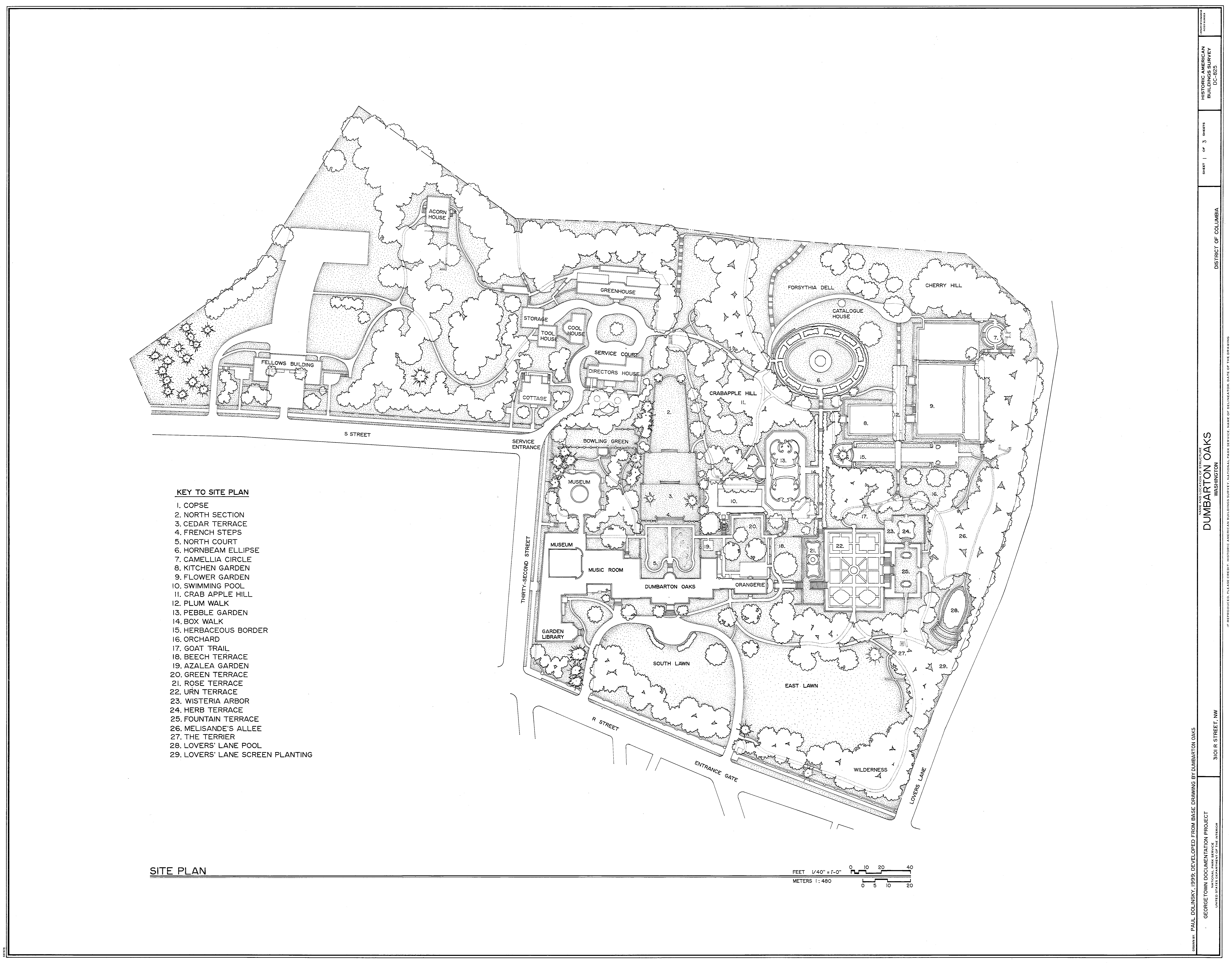
Dumbarton Oaks site plan

Her most notable work was at the Dumbarton Oaks estate in the Georgetown district of Washington, D.C., for Mildred and Robert Woods Bliss (1922–1940). Her design was inspired by her European ventures, especially from the Italian Renaissance gardens, and consisted of establishing a sophisticated relationship between the architectural and natural environments, with formal terraced gardens stepping down a steep slope and transitioning to a more naturalistic aesthetic approaching the creek.

In 1928, her husband accepted the position as the first Director of The Huntington Library (1927–41) in San Marino, California. They moved to California, but Farrand had trouble building a clientele in that state. William Hertrich had long-standing dominion of the Botanical Gardens at the Huntington. The landscape designers Florence Yoch and Louise Council, and Lockwood DeForest Jr., among others, were already well-established there. Her few projects came via friends, such as the Bliss winter and retirement estate, Casa Dorinda, in Montecito, California, and the patronage of Mildred Bliss's mother, Anna Blakely Bliss, for the nearby Santa Barbara Botanic Garden project. In the Los Angeles area, she had several commissions each with astronomer George Ellery Hale and architect Myron Hunt. With the latter she worked on projects at Occidental College and the California Institute of Technology (Caltech).

Farrand commuted cross-country by train for her eastern projects, such as the design and supervision of the Chinese inspired garden at 'The Eyrie' for Abby Aldrich Rockefeller in Seal Harbor, Maine (1926–35). This was the era of the automobile, and in her designs Farrand applied principles learned earlier from Frederick Law Olmsted's drives at the Arnold Arboretum and the Biltmore Estate of George Washington Vanderbilt II. John D. Rockefeller Jr. sought out and funded Farrand to design planting plans for subtle carriage roads at Acadia National Park on Mount Desert Island, Maine, near her Reef Point home (c.1930). Their use continues at the Park.

Extant Farrand private gardens in the eastern U.S. are: the Bliss family's Dumbarton Oaks in Georgetown, Washington, D.C.; the Harkness summer home 'Eolia' in Waterford, Connecticut (1918–1924), now preserved as the Harkness Memorial State Park; and the Rockefellers' estate 'The Eyrie' in Seal Harbor, Maine. She also collaborated with Edith Wharton on landscape and garden design for The Mount, Wharton's home in Lenox, Massachusetts, which is open to visitors from May–October. Henry James introduced her to Theodate Pope Riddle, "one of her most fascinating clients", who owned the estate 'Hill-Stead' (1913), now preserved as the Hill-Stead Museum in Farmington, Connecticut. In 1942, with Walter Macomber, she designed the gardens at Green Spring, near Alexandria, Virginia.

The Santa Barbara Botanic Garden, for California native plants, represents her talent in Santa Barbara, California. In England, her evolving major project, 'Dartington Hall', was for heiress Dorothy Payne Elmhirst in Devon (1932–37). The Reef Point Collection of her library, drawings and herbarium specimens are archived in the Environmental Design Archives at the College of Environmental Design at the University of California, Berkeley campus, except for the Dumbarton Oaks documents located at the library there, and the Arnold Arboretum drawings in their archives, both under the stewardship of Harvard.

In 2014, Farrand was recognized for her work designing the Peggy Rockefeller Rose Garden at New York Botanical Garden, a winning site of Built by Women New York City, a competition launched by the Beverly Willis Architecture Foundation during the fall of 2014 to identify outstanding and diverse sites and spaces designed, engineered and built by women.

== College campuses ==
Farrand's campus designs were based on three concepts: plants that bloomed throughout the academic year, emphasizing architecture as well as hiding flaws, and using upright and climbing plants so that the small spaces between buildings would not seem reduced in scale. Her designs are noted for their practicality, simplicity and ease of maintenance. She was the first consulting landscape architect for Princeton University in Princeton, New Jersey (1912–43).

As new buildings are constructed at Princeton now, architects are often referred to Farrand's papers at U.C. Berkeley. She was the consulting landscape architect at Yale University in New Haven, Connecticut, for twenty-three years (1923–45), with projects including the Marsh Botanical Garden. She later went on to improve a dozen other campuses including the University of Chicago (1929–43), along with Southern California's Occidental College and the California Institute of Technology. Beatrix Farrand completed design work for the Pennsylvania School of Horticulture for Women (1931–32). Later, she was also the landscape consultant to the Arnold Arboretum of Harvard University (1946–50).

== Later years and death ==
During the last part of her life, Farrand devoted herself to creating a landscape study center at Reef Point, Maine. Here she continued developing the extensive garden and preparing the property for a transition to a public study center. She published the Reef Point Gardens Bulletin (1946–55), in which she reported on the progress of the gardens and center.

After a wildfire on the island and facing a lack of funding to complete and ensure the continued operation of a center she made a remarkable decision in 1955 to discontinue the preparations, dismantle the garden, sell the property, and use the proceeds for her last years. John D. Rockefeller Jr. purchased all Reef Point's larger plants for his Asticou Azalea Garden in Northeast Harbor, Maine, which continue to flower. Approximately 2,000 herbarium specimens were given to the University and Jepson Herbaria at the University of California, Berkeley, where they serve as a permanent record of her choice of plants and localities.

Farrand lived at and spent the last three years of her life at Garland Farm, the home of her friends Lewis and Amy Magdalene Garland, on Mount Desert Island, Maine. It was here that she created her final garden, an intimate space in keeping with the size of the property. At age 86, Farrand died at the Mount Desert Island Hospital on February 28, 1959.

The Garland Farm was purchased by the Beatrix Farrand Society on January 9, 2004. The society's mission is "to foster the art and science of horticulture and landscape design, with emphasis on the life and work of Beatrix Farrand". It plans to continue Reef Point's original educational mission as well as to preserve Garland Farm and Beatrix Farrand's final garden.
