= John W. Lederle Graduate Research Center =

Building at the University of Massachusetts Amherst

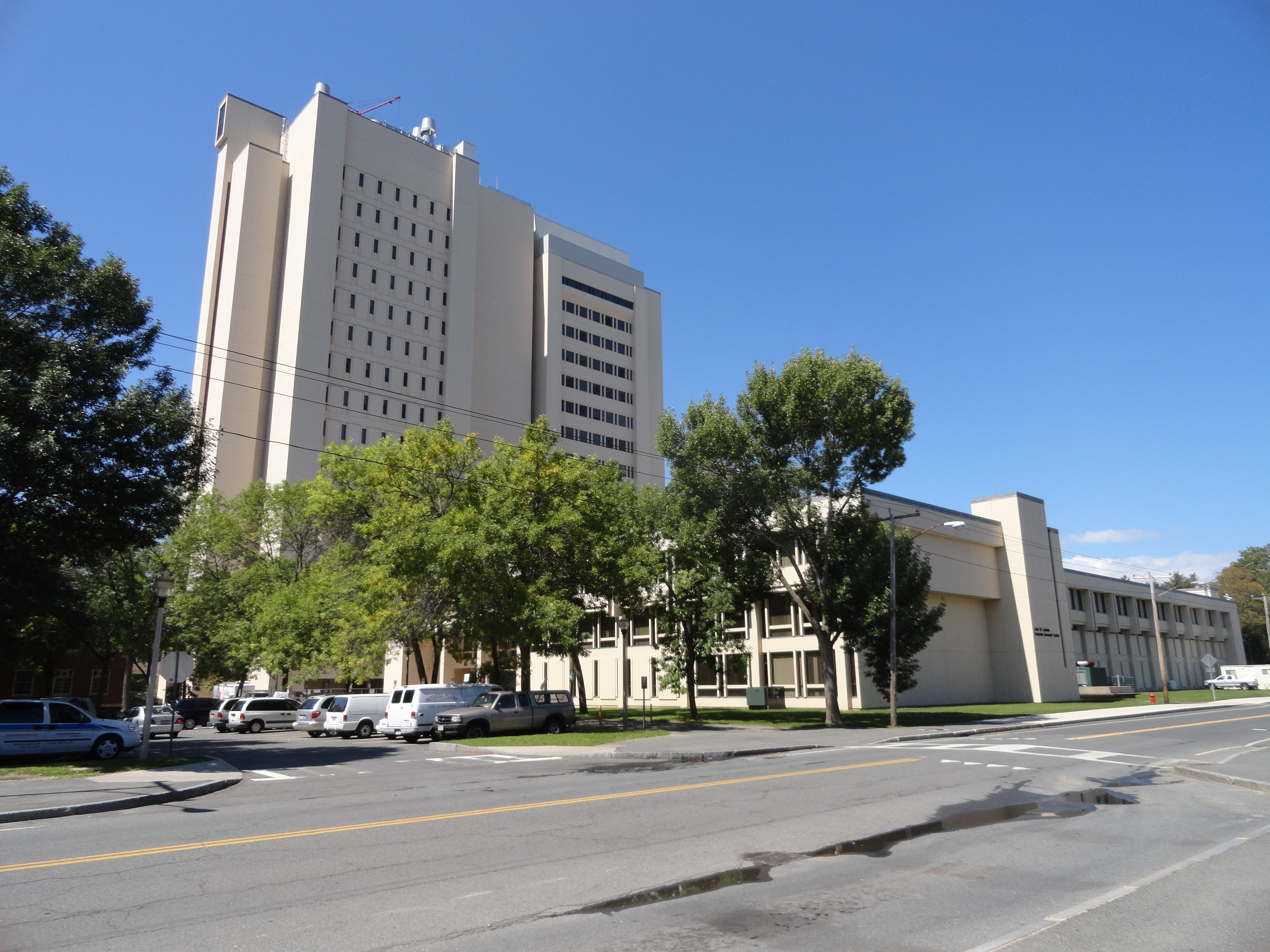
- Lederle Graduate Research Center in 2011
- Interactive map of the John W. Lederle Graduate Research Center area

General information
- Type: Academic offices, classrooms, research laboratories
- Location: Amherst, Massachusetts 01003; United States
- Coordinates: 42°23′37.99″N 72°31′39.89″W
- Current tenants: Dept. of Astronomy; Dept. of Chemistry; Dept. of Mathematics; Dept. of Physics; Dept. of Biochemistry and Molecular Biology
- Completed: 1970s

Height
- Roof: 210.0 feet (64.01 m)

Technical details
- Floor count: 16

The John W. Lederle Graduate Research Center, also known as Lederle Tower or LGRT, is a building in Amherst, Massachusetts. It is part of the University of Massachusetts Amherst. It contains research laboratories, conference rooms, and offices for many departments within the College of Natural Sciences. There is also a substantial amount of classroom space, formerly teaching laboratories, and a large seminar room. The building is also connected to the Lederle Lowrise and other surrounding buildings.

The building's adjacent Lowrise is home to the Science and Engineering Library, one of the two libraries at the UMass Amherst Campus, the other being the W. E. B. Du Bois Library.
