= Marsh Botanical Garden =

Botanical garden and arboretum in Connecticut, U.S.

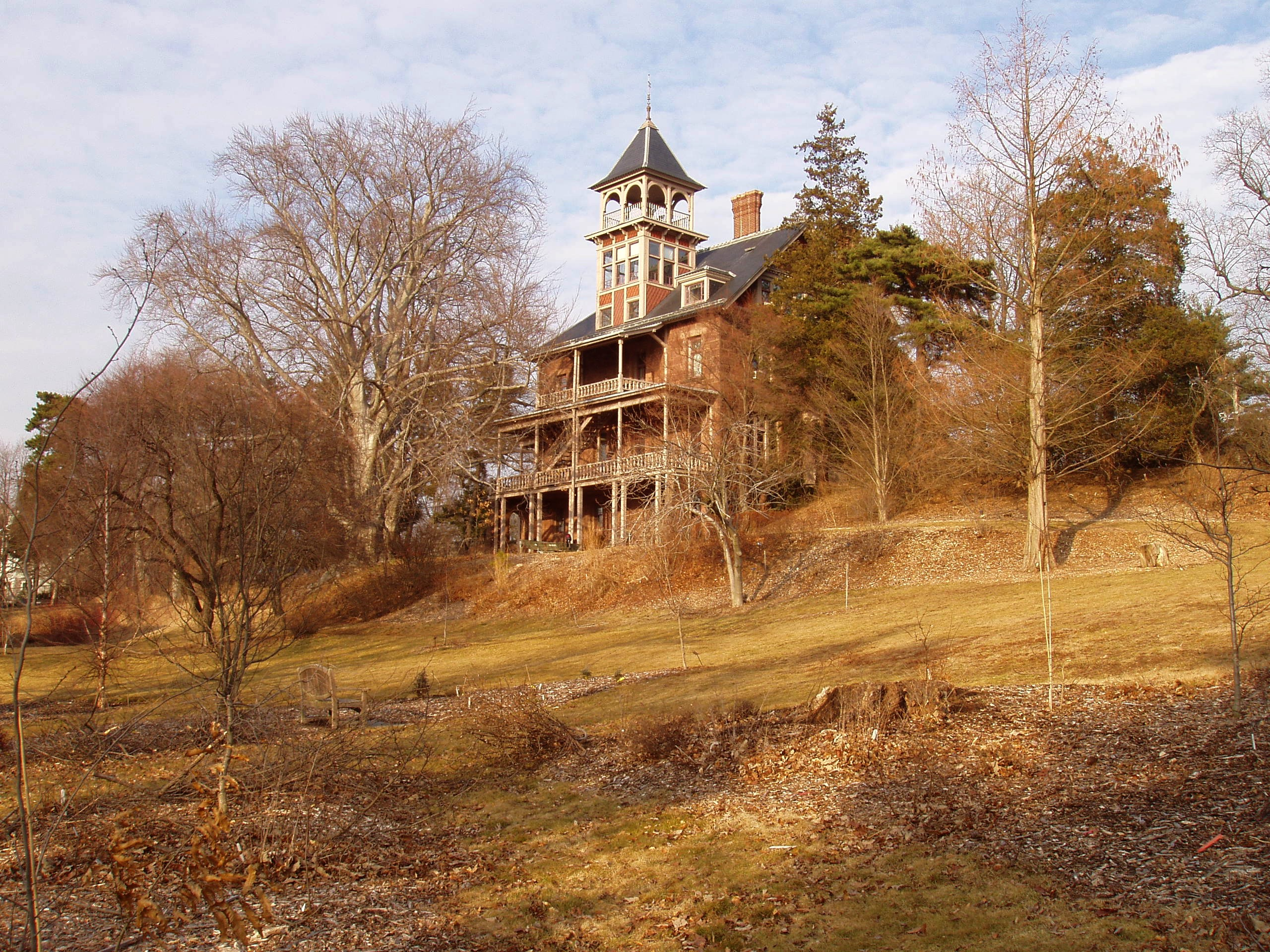
- Marsh Hall in 2006
- Location: 265 Mansfield Street; New Haven, Connecticut, U.S.
- Coordinates: 41°19′21″N 72°55′32″W
- Established: 1899
- Founder: Othniel Charles Marsh
- Designer: Beatrix Farrand
- Owned by: Yale University
- Managed by: Erika Edwards
- Open: 9:00am-4:00pm, Monday through Friday
- Website: marshbotanicalgarden.yale.edu

The Marsh Botanical Garden is a botanical garden and arboretum located on the Yale University campus at 265 Mansfield Street in New Haven, Connecticut, United States.

== History ==
The Garden was established in 1899 when paleontologist Othniel Charles Marsh, an 1860 Yale College graduate, bequeathed his estate and plant collections to the university. The Garden was designed by landscape architect Beatrix Farrand during the 1920s and 1930s as part of her design for the Yale campus.

Today, the Garden supports research and instruction, and is a public greenspace. Only remnants of Farrand's design remain, although restoration work has begun. The greenhouses contain collections of cacti, insectivores, and orchids.

== Directors ==
- James William Toumey
- George Elwood Nichols (1926–1939)
- Edmund Ware Sinnott (1940–1950)
- Oswald Tippo (1955–1960)
- Bruce Bernot Stowe
- Steven Handel (1979–1985)
- Mary Helen Goldsmith (1985–2002)
- Timothy Nelson (2002–2015)
- Michael Donoghue (2015–2018)
- Erika Edwards (2018–present)

== See also ==
- List of botanical gardens in the United States
