= Augustus C. Gurnee =

American socialite and art patron

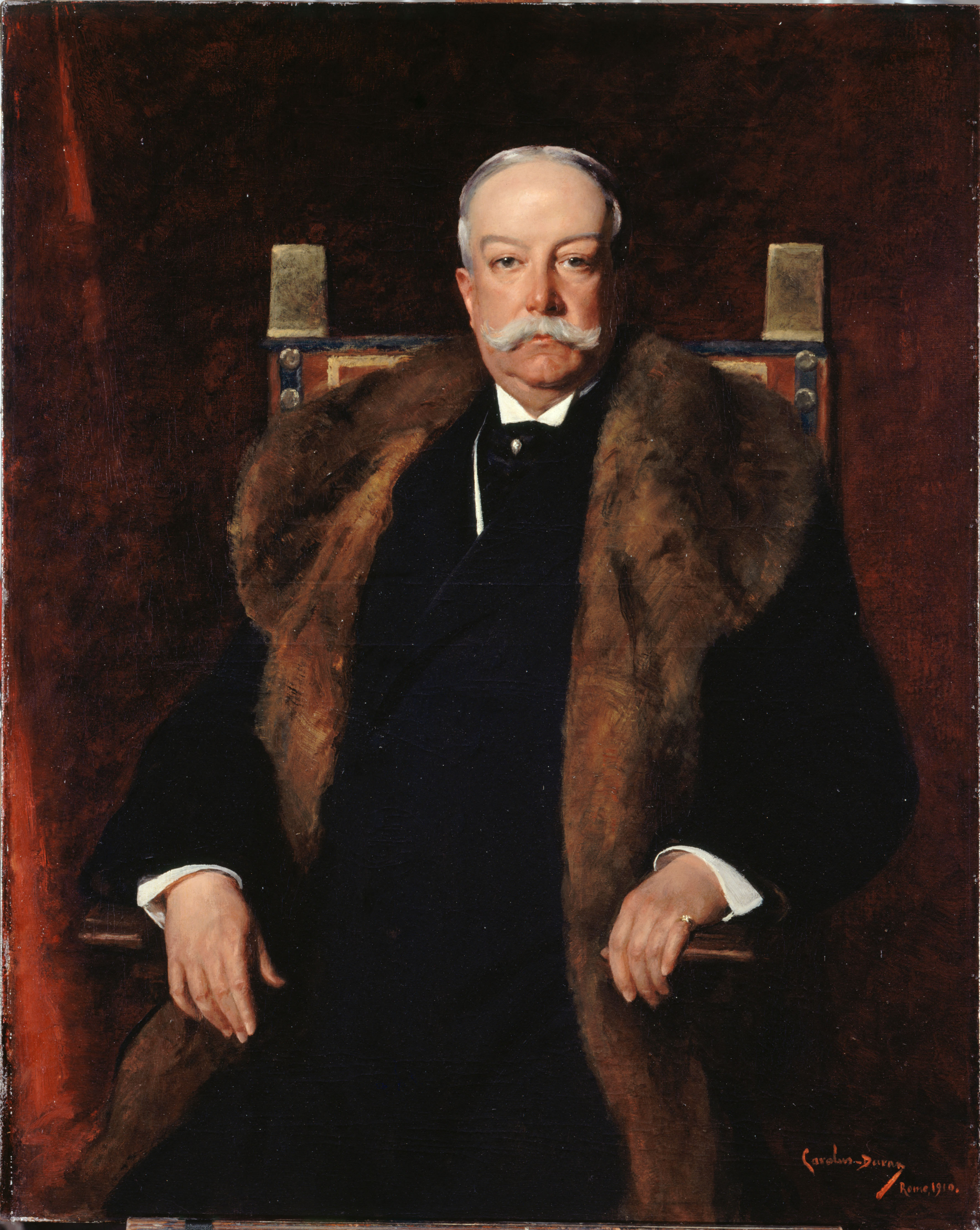
- Portrait of Gurnee by Carolus-Duran, 1910, Petit Palais
- Born: Augustus Coe Gurnee; March 11, 1855; Chicago, Illinois, U.S.
- Died: July 6, 1926 (aged 71); Baden-Baden, Germany
- Education: Harvard University
- Parent(s): Walter S. Gurnee; Mary Coe Gurnee
- Relatives: Frantz Hunt Coe (cousin); Descendants of Robert Coe
- Awards: Légion d’Honneur

Augustus Coe Gurnee (March 11, 1855 – July 6, 1926) was an American socialite and art patron during the Gilded Age.

== Early life ==
Gurnee was born on March 11, 1855, in Chicago, Illinois. He was the son of Mary (née Coe) Gurnee (1820–1893) and capitalist Walter Smith Gurnee (1813–1903), who served as Mayor Chicago from 1851 to 1853 and was the namesake of Gurnee, Illinois. Gurnee attended Harvard University and graduated with the class of 1878. Through his maternal uncle, Dr. Matthew Daniel Coe, he was a first cousin of Frantz Hunt Coe, the physician, public official and educator. Among his siblings was Delia E. Gurnee, Mary Evelyn Gurnee, Frances Medora Gurnee, Walter Scott Gurnee, Grace Gurnee, and Isabel Gurnee.

In 1863, the family moved to New York where his father engaged in banking and other businesses, serving as the treasurer and director of the Shelby Iron Company, the American Smelting and Refining Company, and the American Surety Company, among others.

== Society life ==
After graduating from Harvard, where he was a member of the Hasty Pudding Club, he briefly worked as a banker in New York. Gurnee was "free from the necessity of engaging in business" and, instead, spent his time "engrossed in the cultivation of the arts and spent much time in travel, living at intervals in Italy and France."

In 1892, Gurnee was included in Ward McAllister's "Four Hundred", purported to be an index of New York's best families, published in The New York Times. Conveniently, 400 was the number of people that could fit into Mrs. Astor's ballroom.

== Personal life ==
Gurnee had a home in Bar Harbor, Maine, Paris, and Nice, France. His home in Maine, known as Beaudesert, was originally designed by William Ralph Emerson in 1881, but was renovated for Gurnee in 1900 by architect Fred L. Savage, who also designed the nearby Breakwater, Reverie Cove, Raventhorp, and the Philler Cottage. In 1925, he donated his home in Nice, for the benefit of wounded soldiers, and a number of valuable works of art to the city of Paris, including twelve tapestries of Aubusson, Flanders, and Paris before the time of Gobelin. He was honored by France with the ribbon of the Chevalier of the Légion d’Honneur.

Gurnee, who did not marry, died on July 6, 1926, in Baden-Baden, Germany, and was interred at the Gurnee Mausoleum at Sleepy Hollow Cemetery. In his will, Gurnee left many large bequeaths to charity, including the Presbyterian Hospital, St. Luke's Hospital, the Nursery and Child's Hospital, and the Association for Improving the Condition of the Poor, many trust funds for his relatives, and then left his residuary estate to Harvard. His secretary, Gustave Frederick Dutschke, who lived at 17 Avenue d'Iéna in Paris, received $300,000 in three and a half per cent Liberty bonds and $20,000 a year from the residuary estate.
