= Cottages of Bar Harbor =

Houses in Bar Harbor, Maine

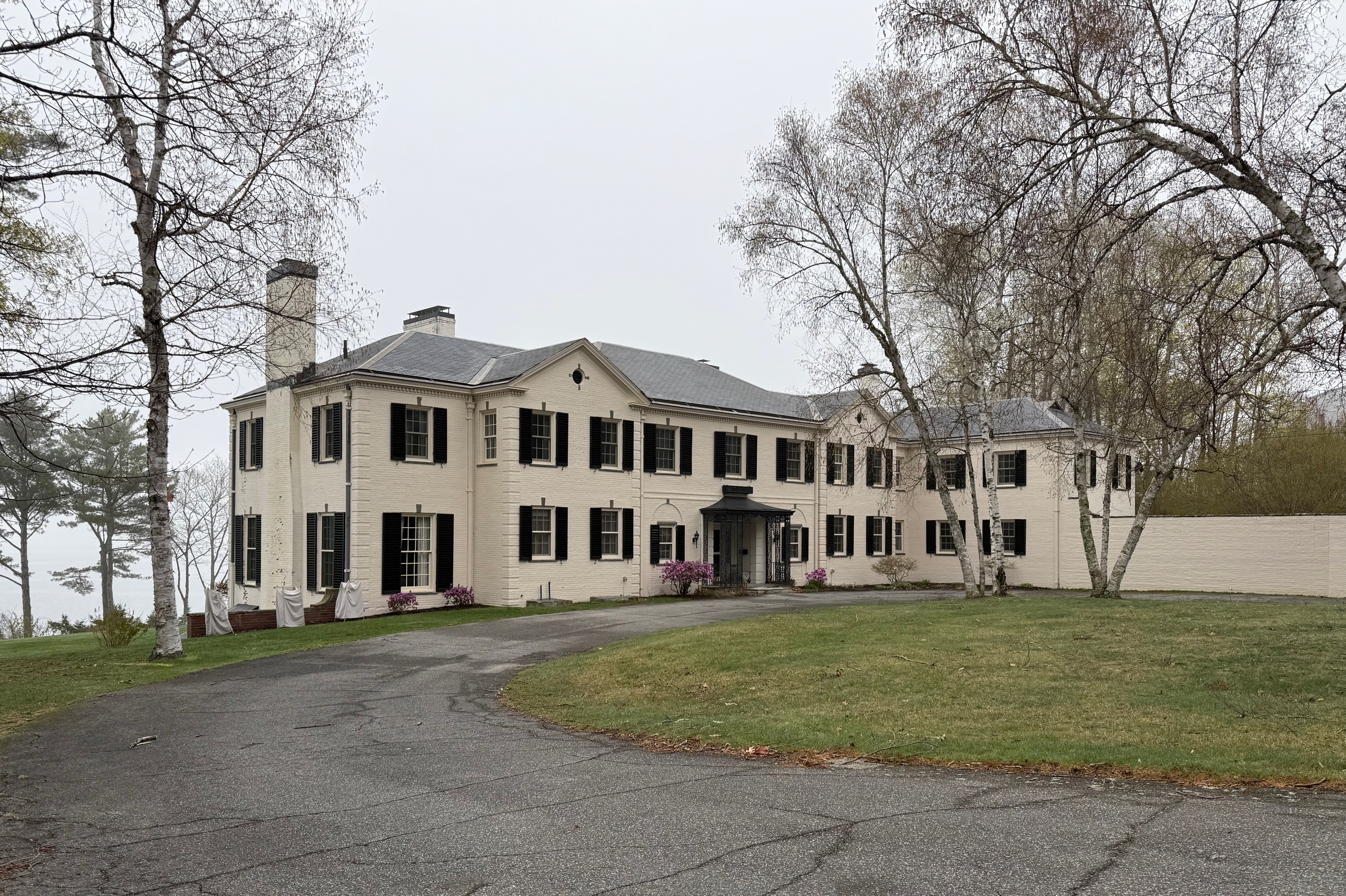
Bayview Cottage in Bar Harbor, a former home of United States Army Medal of Honor recipient George G. McMurtry

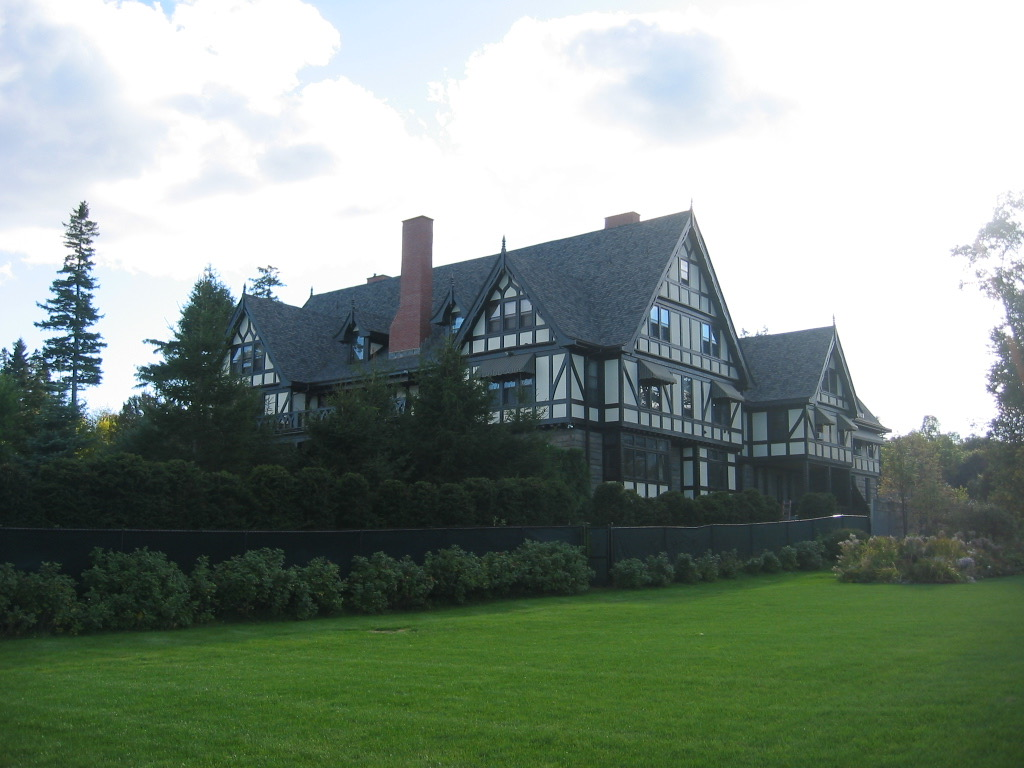
John Innes Kane Cottage, overlooking Frenchman Bay, viewed from Bar Harbor's Shore Path.

Beginning in the 19th century, wealthy summer residents of Bar Harbor, Maine, built summer "cottages" which became noted for their extravagance. By 1890, the cottage-building boom was in full swing.

Alpheus Hardy built the town's first cottage in 1868. This was followed by one owned by Harry Allen Grant Jr. (1836–1898). Grant Park in the town is named for the attorney.

Cornelius Vanderbilt (1794–1877) built cottages in Bar Harbor, while the Astor family owned hotels and cottages in the town and the surrounding areas.

Architect Fred Lincoln Savage designed over 300 cottages on Mount Desert Island and across Northeastern Maine, including Reverie Cove and the John Innes Kane Cottage.

During Maine's great fires of 1947, nearly half the eastern side of the island burned, including 67 cottages – nearly one-third of the 222 that stood at the time. (Many were empty or for sale; only 135 were occupied that summer.)
