= Harbor Lane–Eden Street Historic District =

Historic district in Maine, United States

- U.S. National Register of Historic Places
- U.S. Historic district
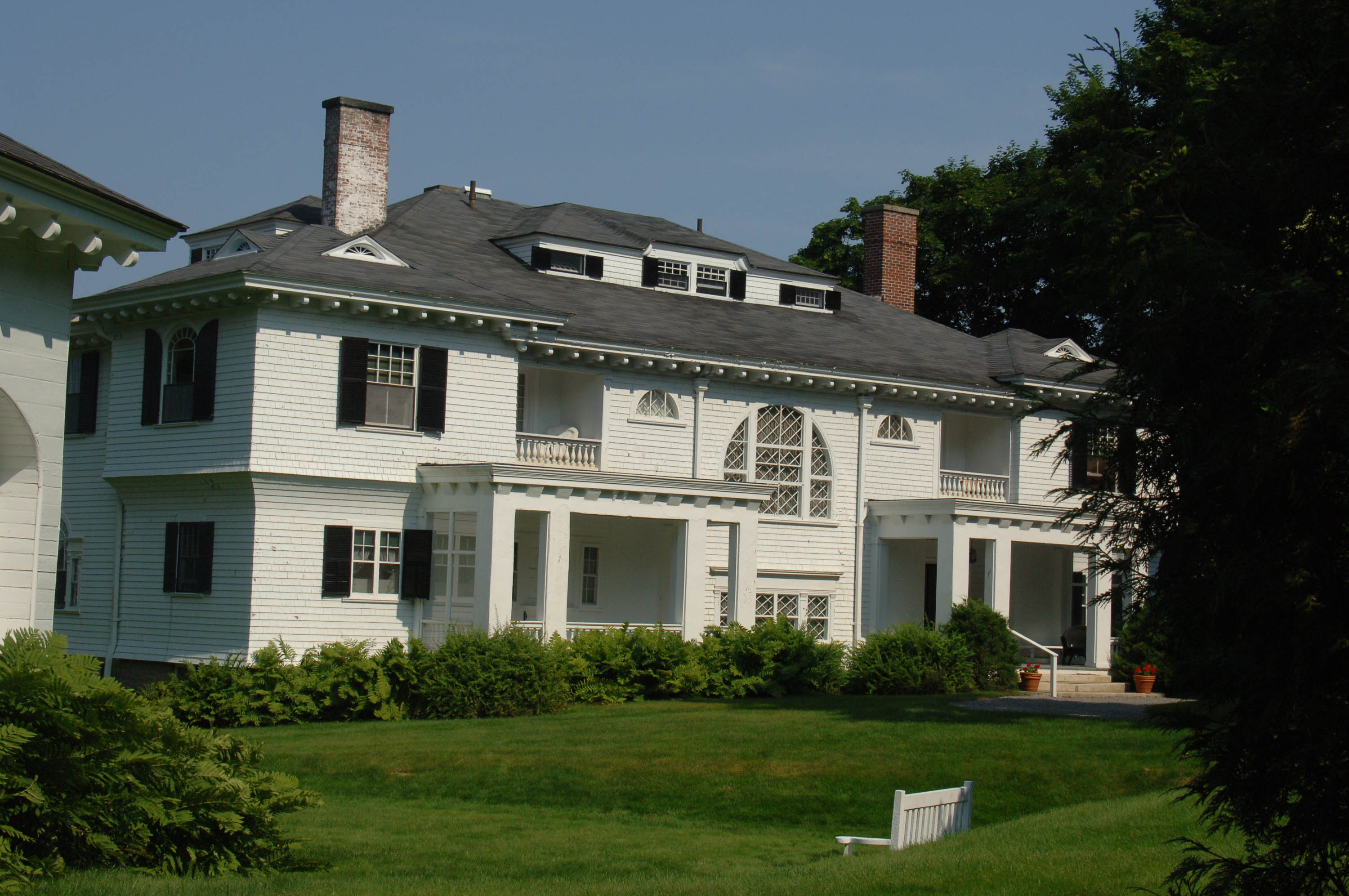
- Reverie Cove

- Location within Maine
- Interactive map showing the location of Harbor Lane–Eden Street Historic District
- Location: Portions of Harbor Ln. and Eden St., Bar Harbor, Maine
- Coordinates: 44.39193°N 68.21775°W
- Area: 20 acres (8.1 ha)
- Architect: Robert Day Andrews; Duncan Candler; DeGrasse Fox; Herbert Jacques; Arthur McFarland; Bruce Price; Augustus N. Rantoul; Arthur Rotch; Fred L. Savage; John Calvin Stevens; George Thomas Tilden
- Architectural style: Colonial Revival, Classical Revival, Queen Anne
- NRHP reference No.: 09000550
- Added to NRHP: July 22, 2009

The Harbor Lane–Eden Street Historic District encompasses a neighborhood of Bar Harbor, Maine, consisting of architect-designed summer estates that served as the summer of elite society families of the late 19th and early 20th centuries. Located northwest of the main village and fronting on Frenchman Bay, the district includes nine summer houses that survived a devastating 1947 fire which destroyed many other summer estates. The district was listed on the National Register of Historic Places in 2009.

== Background and setting ==
Bar Harbor is located on the northeast of Mount Desert Island on the central coast of Maine. During the late 19th and early 20th centuries the island was developed as a summer resort for the wealthy elites of eastern cities, with summer estates rivaling those of Newport, Rhode Island. Bar Harbor was home to a significant number of these estates, many of which were destroyed by a 1947 fire which ravaged the eastern half of the island. The Harbor Lane–Eden Street district is located at the southeastern fringe of the area that escaped damage in the fire. It is roughly bounded on the southeast by Harbor Lane, Eden Street on the south and southwest, Sea Fox Road (an access road into the campus of the College of the Atlantic, which occupies some of the former estate houses), and Frenchman Bay.

The district consists of ten properties, nine of which include a surviving estate house, and a historic wharf. The main house of the tenth property, Fabian Cottage, was demolished in 1975, and only its 1887 stable survives. Four of the ten properties, Witch Cliff, Acadia Cottage, Sea Fox, and the Fabian Cottage stable, as well as the stone wharf just south of Sea Fox, are now owned by the College of the Atlantic and form part of its campus. The other six properties are located south of the campus.

In 2017, the town of Bar Harbor revised its list of historic properties, which meant that those property owners will have imposed on them additional requirements should they wish to demolish or renovate said property. The Harbor Lane and/or Eden Street properties on the list:

=== Eden Street ===
- Blanchfield House, number 37
- Caruso Residence, 41
- Bagatelle, 75. A Queen Anne and Shingle style building designed by Rotch and Tilden and completed in 1883. It was one of the first estates built in the area. A carriage house and guest house, both designed by Rotch and Tilden, are included on the property. The estate includes land that once belonged to an estate that was destroyed by the 1947 fire.
- Villa Mary, 77. The oldest estate in the district. It was built in 1879–80 to designs by New York City architect Bruce Price, with later remodeling in the 1920s by Arthur McFarland. This estate includes land from two others destroyed in the 1947 fire.

=== Harbor Lane ===
- Fenwold, number 6. Also formerly known as Colonial Hall, it was designed by noted Maine architect John Calvin Stevens, and is his only known commission in Bar Harbor. It was built in 1891 for the Rufus King family, and enlarged in 1918. It is stylistically a combination of Colonial and Mediterranean Renaissance Revival architecture.

== Other private estates ==
=== Reverie Cove ===
Reverie Cove (7 Harbor Lane), was designed by local architect Fred L. Savage and built in 1893 for Dr. John Davies Jones. It is an opulent Colonial Revival building with Italian Renaissance Revival details. It was separately listed on the National Register in 1982. The property includes a period carriage house.

=== Anchorhold ===
Anchorhold (9 Harbor Lane), also formerly known as Elwood and Anchorage, is an 1885 Shingle style house designed by Rotch and Tilden and restyled in 1893 by Fred L. Savage. It was built for Miss E. H. Elwood, who only used it for a few years before selling it. This property also includes a period carriage house.

=== Green Court ===
Green Court (8 Harbor Lane), formerly known as Mainstay, was originally designed by Rotch and Tilden, but underwent later alterations designed by Andrews, Jaques & Rantoul (in 1893) and Duncan Candler (in 1932). It is a three-story Colonial Revival building with Tudor elements. Its carriage house also survives, but has been extensively altered and is no longer historically significant.

== See also ==
- National Register of Historic Places listings in Hancock County, Maine
