= Augustus Chase Savage =

American businessman

- Born: March 14, 1832; Northeast Harbor, Maine, U.S.
- Died: March 30, 1911 (aged 79); Northeast Harbor, Maine, U.S.
- Occupation(s): Businessman, hotelier
- Spouse: Emily Manchester
- Children: 6 (including Frederick Lincoln Savage)

Augustus Chase Savage (commonly known as A. C. Savage; March 14, 1832 – March 30, 1911) was an American businessman and hotelier. Along with his wife, Emily, he established the Asticou Inn in Northeast Harbor, Maine, in 1883. It is still in operation today.

== Early life ==
Savage was born in 1832 to John Savage II (1801–1868), a Glaswegian, and Climena Roberts (1801–1884), a native of Bath, Maine. He was the only child of seven to survive to maturity. (One of his brothers, Samuel Tyler, was killed in 1865 at the age of 23 shortly after returning home from the Civil War, while the other brothers died of tuberculosis and other diseases. Each of his sisters died young.)

His parents built a farmhouse on the site now occupied by the Asticou Inn in his hometown of Northeast Harbor, Maine. The farmhouse was moved a short distance away, across Peabody Drive, when construction of the inn began. (The farmhouse existed for almost two centuries, until 2013, when it was torn down.)

== Career ==
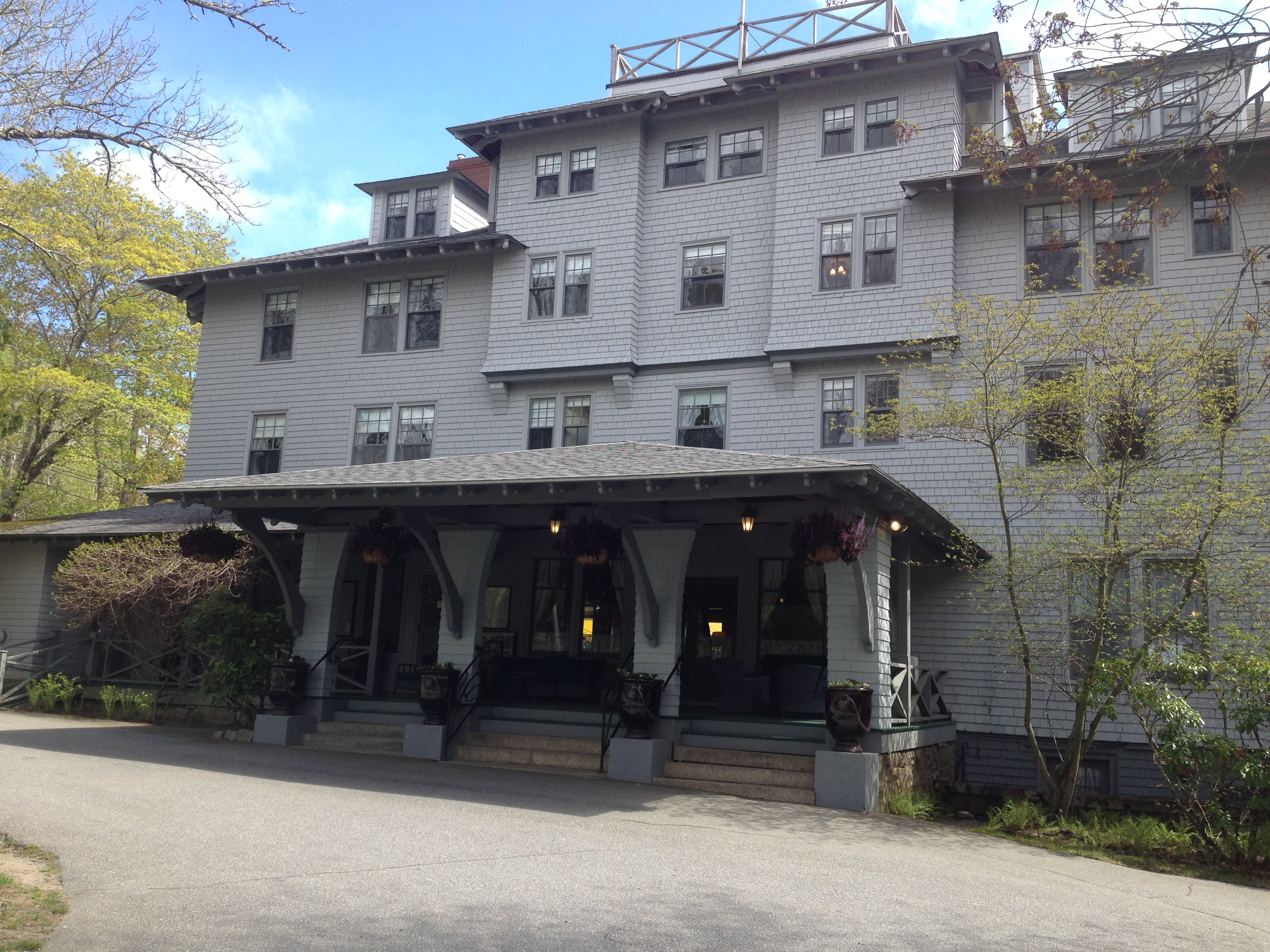
The Asticou Inn in 2014

Savage correctly predicted that an overflow of vacationers to nearby Bar Harbor would greatly benefit Northeast Harbor. In 1883, across the road from the 1854-built Harbor Cottage (today's Cranberry Lodge), he built the Asticou Inn. (The name Asticou comes from a Penobscot Indian word believed to mean boiling kettle.)

The original Asticou Inn building was destroyed by a fire sixteen years after opening. It was rebuilt by A. C. and his son, George (1873–1922). Another of A. C.'s sons, Frederick Lincoln Savage (1861–1924), was the architect. It reopened in 1901. The inn was spared during the great fires of 1947.

In 1904, Savage created the family's Forest Hill Cemetery, on the other side of the Asticou Azalea Garden from the inn. Family members who had previously been buried beside the inn were moved to Forest Hill.

== Personal life ==
Savage married Emily Manchester (1834–1914), and they lived in Harbor Cottage, part of the Asticou Inn's buildings today. The couple had eight children.

== Death ==
Savage died in 1911, aged 79. He was interred in Forest Hill Cemetery. His wife was buried beside him upon her death three years later.
