= Raventhorp =

Historic house in Maine, United States

- U.S. National Register of Historic Places
- Location within Maine Location within the United States
- Nearest city: Southwest Harbor, Maine
- Coordinates: 44°16′58″N 68°18′12″W
- Area: 8.7 acres (3.5 ha)
- Built: 1895
- Architect: Savage & Stratton
- NRHP reference No.: 87002195
- Added to NRHP: January 7, 1988

Raventhorp is a historic summerhouse in Southwest Harbor, Maine. It is prominently situated at the northern tip of Greening Island, which is set at the mouth of Somes Sound, the inlet dividing Mount Desert Island, between the villages of Southwest Harbor and Northeast Harbor. It was designed by the partnership of Fred L. Savage and Milton W. Stratton and built in 1895 for Joseph Gilbert Thorp and Anne Longfellow Thorp. The Shingle style house is an important surviving example of this collaboration, and was listed on the National Register of Historic Places in 1988.

== Description and history ==
Greening Island is located off the southern coast of Mount Desert Island roughly midway between the villages of Southwest Harbor and Northeast Harbor at the mouth of Somes Sound, a long narrow inlet that divides Mount Desert Island into two large lobes. Raventhorp is located on 8.7 acres (3.5 ha) of land at the northern tip of the island. The main house is set very near the tip, facing north. It is a large 2 1/2-story Shingle style structure, with a wraparound porch that has sunrooms enclosed in glass at its eastern and western ends. The porch has a shallow hip roof supported by clusters (twos and threes) of square columns. The main block of the house has a variety of gables, projections, and recessed sections typical of the Shingle style. The eastern facade has a prominent high rubble-stone foundation, and a projecting polygonal bay that rises through the main roof to a turreted roof of its own. The interior features extensive original woodwork, from paneling in the public spaces to cabinetry in the kitchen.

Raventhorp is a significant surviving example of the collaboration of architects Fred L. Savage and Milton W. Stratton. Savage was a well-known architect based primarily in Bar Harbor who executed a number of designs for summer cottages and hotels on Mount Desert Island. From 1892 to 1898 he partnered with Stratton, about whom little is known. This summer house was built in 1895 for Joseph Gilbert Thorp and Anne Longfellow Thorp, he a prominent Boston lawyer and she the daughter of poet Henry Wadsworth Longfellow. The house remained in the Thorp family until 1981.

== See also ==
- National Register of Historic Places listings in Hancock County, Maine
