= Fred Lincoln Savage =

American architect (1861–1924)

- Fred Lincoln Savage, c. 1898
- Born: November 14, 1861; Northeast Harbor, Maine, U.S.
- Died: February 26, 1924 (aged 62); Bar Harbor, Maine, U.S.
- Occupation: Architect
- Buildings: Reverie Cove; Raventhorp; Asticou Inn; John Innes Kane Cottage

Fred Lincoln Savage (November 14, 1861 – February 26, 1924) was an American architect, known as Mount Desert Island's most prolific native architect. During the late 19th and early 20th centuries, he designed over 300 cottages on the island and across Northeastern Maine, including Reverie Cove and the John Innes Kane Cottage in Bar Harbor, and (with Milton W. Stratton) Raventhorp in Southwest Harbor, all listed on the National Register of Historic Places (NRHP). He also designed the NRHP-listed West Gouldsboro Village Library in Gouldsboro, Maine.

== Career ==
Savage studied under prominent Boston architect Robert Swain Peabody, who had designed a house in Northeast Harbor for his brother-in-law Charles Eliot, and worked at Peabody's firm Peabody & Stearns as an office boy and apprentice from 1884–1886. It is partly due to this tutelage that Mount Desert Island has a wealth of shingle-style architecture.

Upon the conclusion of his apprenticeship, Savage returned to Northeast Harbor in 1887, and was quickly noted as being an accomplished and dependable building contractor, as well as someone with an eye for architecture. In 1890, he was hired by James Gardiner, son-in-law of Bishop Doane, to design six cottages for the Harborside area of Northeast Harbor he had purchased three years earlier. Four of the cottages were named Sweet Briar, Grey Pine, Isis and Aerie. An inn, named Harbourside, was also constructed.

In 1893, he opened an office in Bar Harbor. Three years later, he had merged practices with that of Milton Stratton, another Bar Harbor architect. When that partnership ended, Savage built a small Tudor-style office near the intersection of Cottage and Main Streets. After marrying Alice Preble, he moved permanently from Northeast Harbor to Bar Harbor. It was his year-round presence on Mount Desert Island that led to major firms engaging with Savage to oversee their projects. Savage purchased the Bear Mountain granite quarry, using its material on the first floor of his Atlantean cottage and in the John Innes Kane Cottage.

== Selected works ==
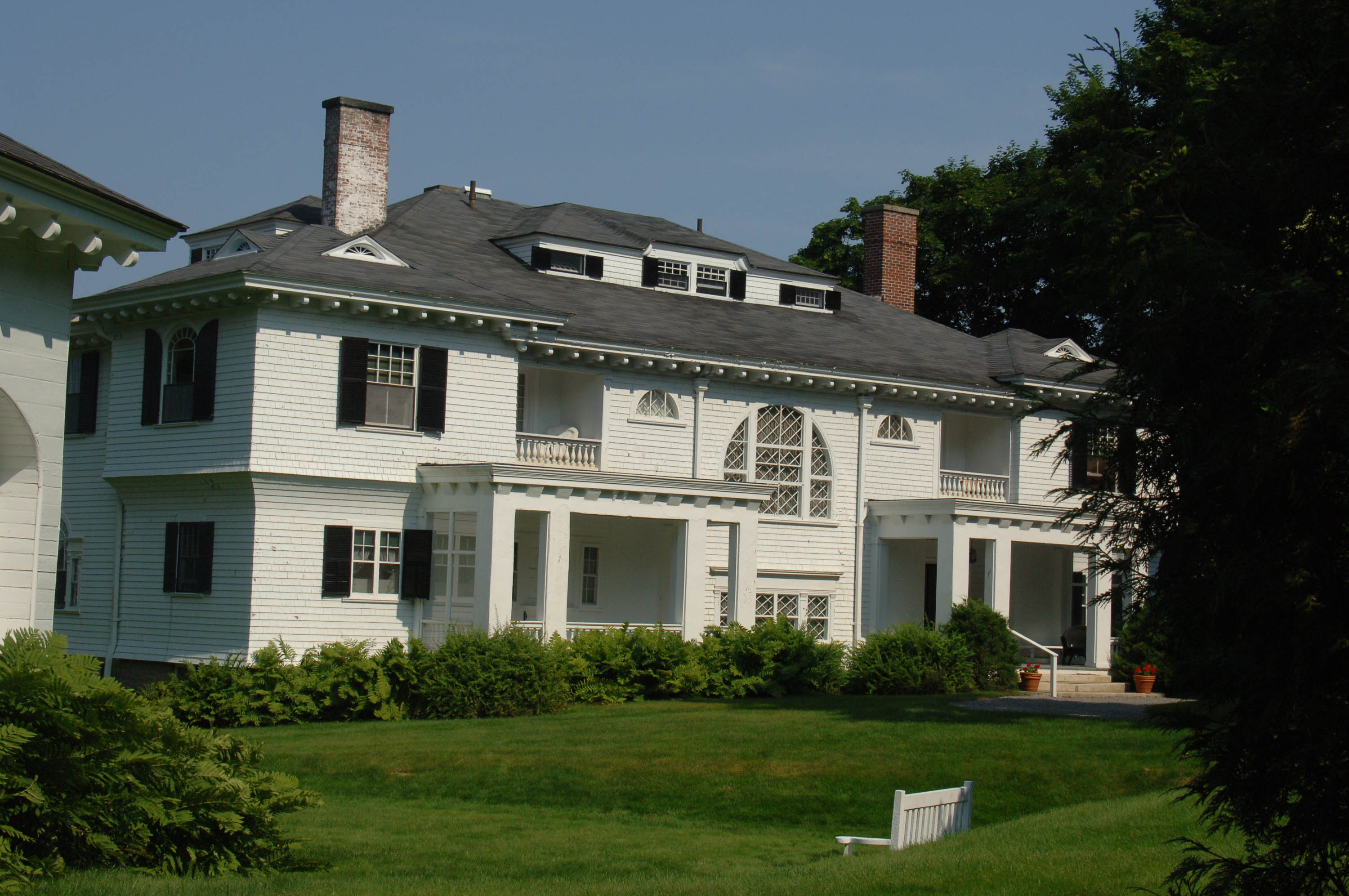
Reverie Cove

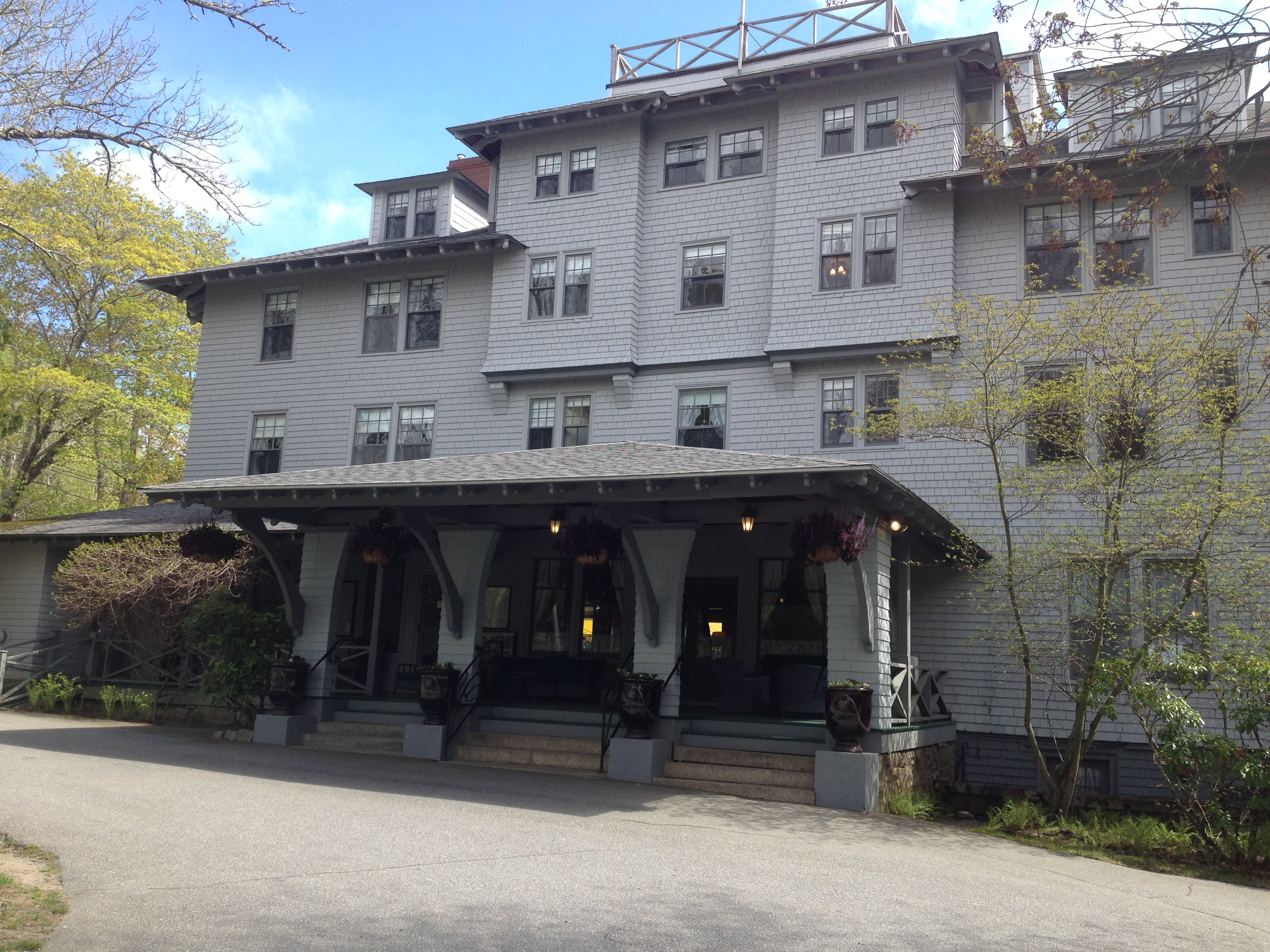
Asticou Inn

George Dorr's rock and spring canopy, designed by Savage

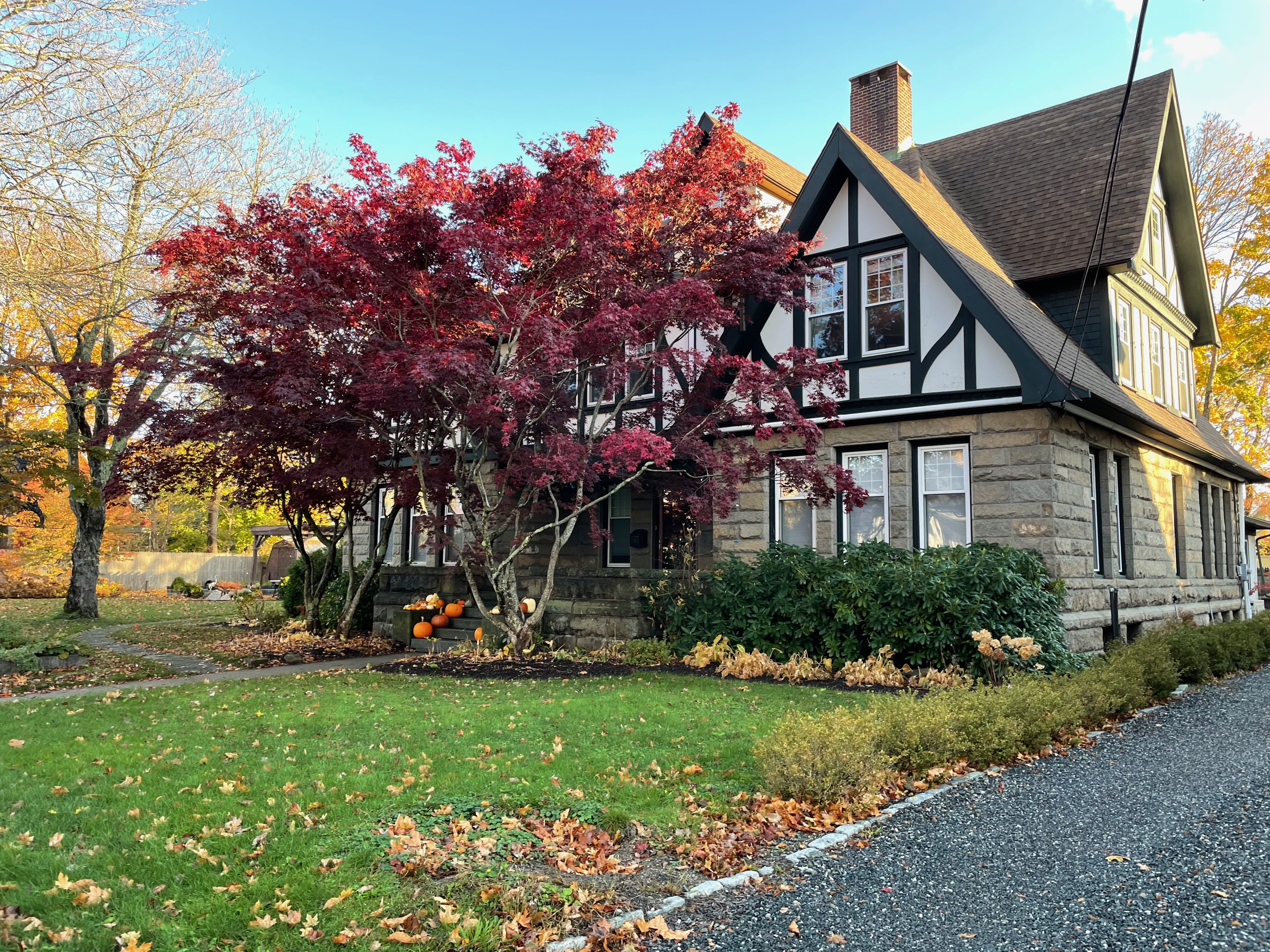
The Atlantean in Bar Harbor, Maine, pictured in 2021, 120 years after its construction

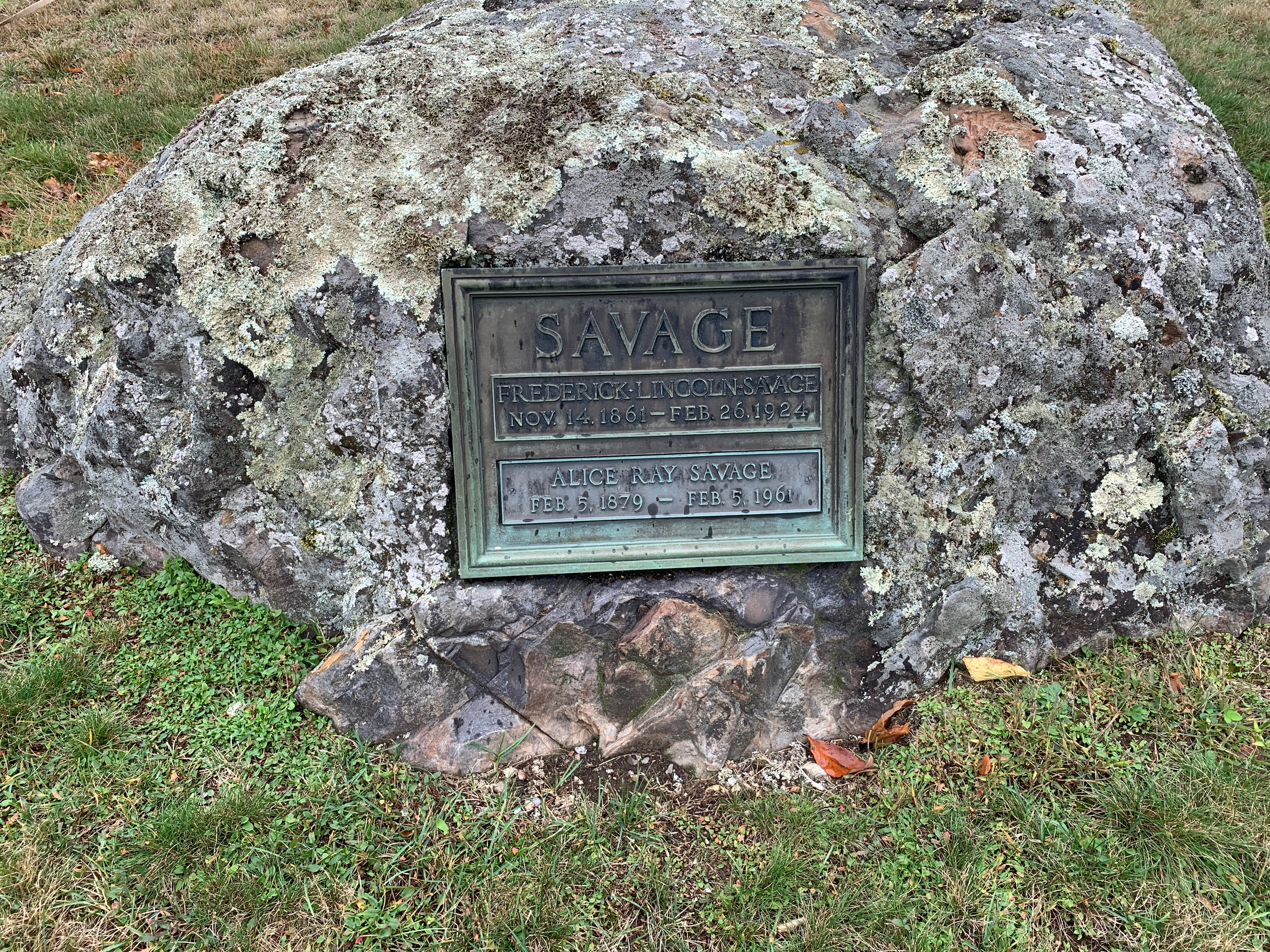
Savage's gravestone at Ledgelawn Cemetery in Bar Harbor

- The Ledge, Northeast Harbor, Maine (1891)
- Roserne, Northeast Harbor, Maine (1891 or before)
- Reverie Cove, Bar Harbor, Maine (1892)
- Raventhorp, Southwest Harbor, Maine (1895 or before)
- Scull Cottage, Mount Desert, Maine (1899)
- Asticou Inn, Northeast Harbor, Maine (1901 reconstruction)
- Callendar House, Bar Harbor, Maine (1901 or before)
- Devilstone, Bar Harbor, Maine (1901 wing)
- Fraley Cottage, Mount Desert, Maine (1901)
- John Innes Kane Cottage (also known as Atlantique or The Breakwater), Bar Harbor, Maine (1903 or before)
- Buena Vista, Bar Harbor, Maine (1904 alterations)
- Aldersea, Bar Harbor, Maine (1904 additions)
- Sunset Shore, Mount Desert, Maine (1904 or before)
- Amberside, Bar Harbor, Maine (1906)
- West Gouldsboro Village Library, Gouldsboro, Maine (1907 or before)
- Canopy, Sieur de Monts spring (1909)
- Highseas, Bar Harbor, Maine (1911)
- Gray Rock, Northeast Harbor, Maine (1912 or before)
- Indian Head Cottage, Northeast Harbor, Maine

== Personal life ==
=== Family ===
Savage was the second of the four sons of Augustus Chase ("A.C.") Savage (1832–1911) and Emily Manchester (1834–1914), the founders of the Asticou Inn in Northeast Harbor, Maine. Fred was the architect of the current, 1901-built inn, the original having burned down in 1899.

Savage's paternal great-grandfather, John, came to America from Glasgow and settled in Salem, Massachusetts, around 1770. He and his wife, Sarah, moved to Mount Desert Island in 1798 and built a cabin near Harbor Brook in Northeast Harbor. Their children rooted themselves in the Asticou section of the village.

When he was 18, his occupation was reported as being a fisherman in the local census. He was also helping his father in building hotels and cottages for the village's expanding community of summer residents, and worked briefly as the village's postmaster.

His first wife was 15-year-old Flora Lee Salisbury (1872–1960). The couple had three children: Frederick Manchester Savage (1891–1892), Floralee Savage (1894–1916) and Francis Chase Savage (1896–1977).

He married a second time, to his secretary Alice Ray Preble (1879–1961), in 1901. It is believed the two had a relationship while Savage was still married to his first wife.

=== Education ===
Savage attended school in Northeast Harbor with his siblings, who made up a total of about 40 students.

=== Homes ===
Around 1887, when he was about 26 years old, Savage owned Hilltop Cottage in Northeast Harbor and lived there with his first wife, Flora.

Another of Savage's personal homes, which also doubled as a model home for prospective business purposes, the Atlantean, on the shore-side stretch of Bar Harbor's Atlantic Avenue, is one of the best examples of Savage's work in the Tudor style. It was built in 1903, and Savage lived there with his second wife, Alice. It was later renamed the Wayside Inn, but as of 2021 it is called the Atlantean again.

== Death ==
Savage died in 1924, at the age of 62, after suffering from what his doctor called "acute indigestion." His second wife, Alice, survived him by 37 years, and they are both interred at Ledgelawn Cemetery in Bar Harbor. For unknown reasons, Fred Savage's grave is marked as Frederick. Savage family records as well as Savage's architectural drawings consistently give his name as Fred L. Savage.
