= West Gouldsboro Village Library =

- U.S. National Register of Historic Places
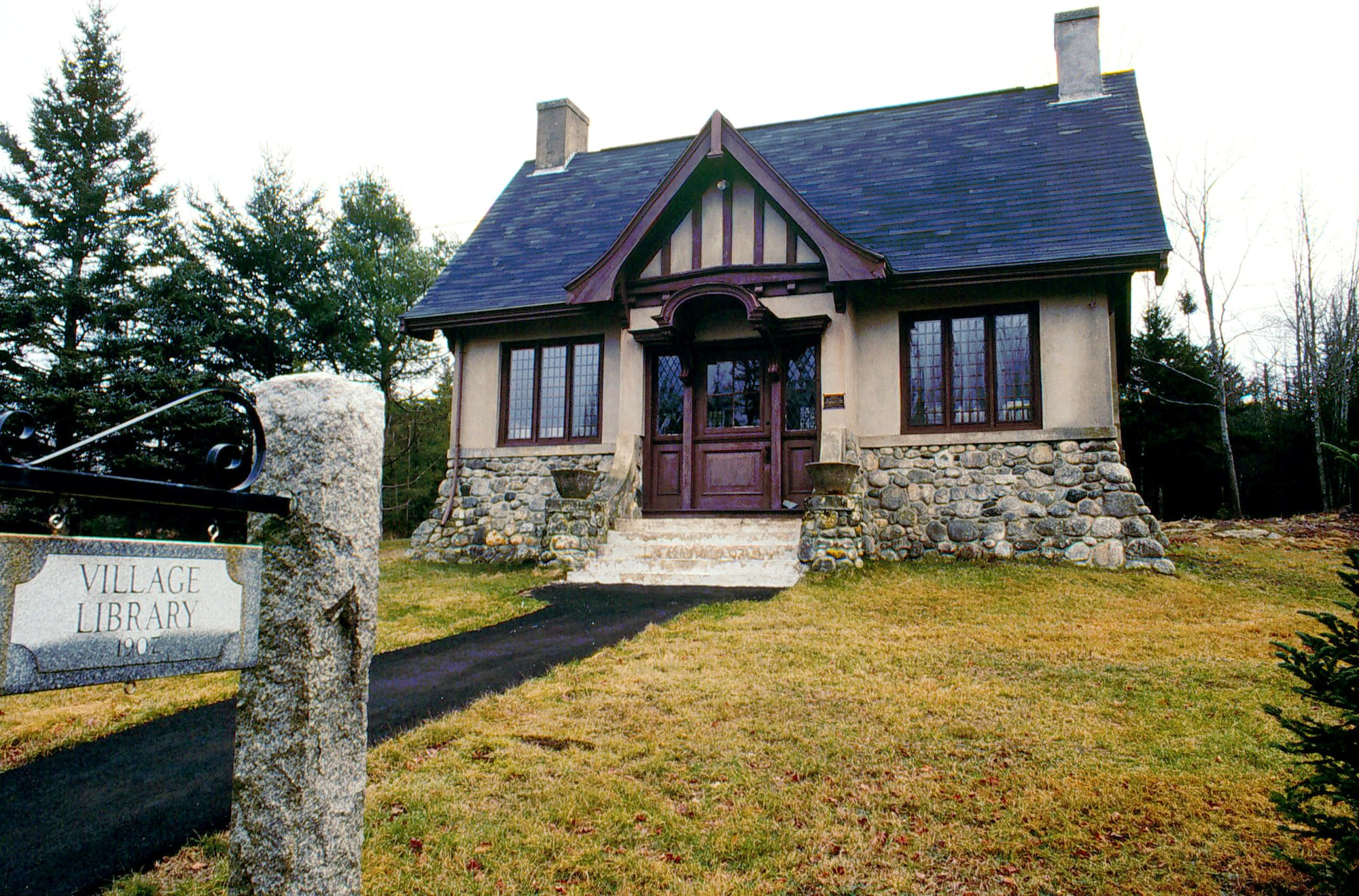

- Location within Maine Location within the United States
- Location: ME 186, E side, between Jones Cove and Jones Pond, West Gouldsboro, Maine
- Coordinates: 44°27′56″N 68°5′41″W
- Area: less than one acre
- Built: 1907
- Architect: Frederick Lincoln Savage
- Architectural style: Tudor Revival
- MPS: Maine Public Libraries MPS
- NRHP reference No.: 91001512
- Added to NRHP: October 23, 1991

The West Gouldsboro Village Library is a historic former library building in Gouldsboro, Maine. Located in West Gouldsboro, this building, designed by Fred L. Savage and built in 1907, is one of the only libraries in Maine built in the Tudor Revival style. It served as a library from 1907 to 1956, and again for a period beginning in 1990. The town's library services are currently provided by the Dorcas Library in Prospect Harbor. This building was listed on the National Register of Historic Places in 1991.

== Architecture and history ==
The library is set on the east side of Maine State Route 186, about 0.5 miles (0.80 km) south of its western junction with United States Route 1, and immediately adjacent to the West Gouldsboro Union Church. It is a small single-story Tudor Revival structure, with a tall fieldstone foundation and a stuccoed exterior. It has a side-gable roof with chimneys at the sides, and a front-facing gable that projects slightly at the center of the main facade. The entrance consists of a single door flanked by sidelight windows with diamond lights, with paneling below that matches the door. This is topped by an elliptical hood, above which is the half-timbered gable front. The bays on either side of the entrance have three casement windows with small square panes. The inside consists of a single large room with projecting fireplaces on either side, which are flanked by niches with original bookcases. The ceiling is coved plaster, with a molded plaster frame.

The idea for construction of the library supposedly originated in 1904 with the minister of the adjacent church. A social library society was formed, and the land was purchased in 1905. The committee retained noted Bar Harbor architect Fred L. Savage to design the building, which was dedicated in 1907. The library operated until 1956, and was thereafter maintained by the West Gouldsboro Village Improvement Association. The library was reopened in 1990, but has since closed.

== See also ==
- National Register of Historic Places listings in Hancock County, Maine
