= Highseas =

Historic house in Maine, United States

- U.S. National Register of Historic Places
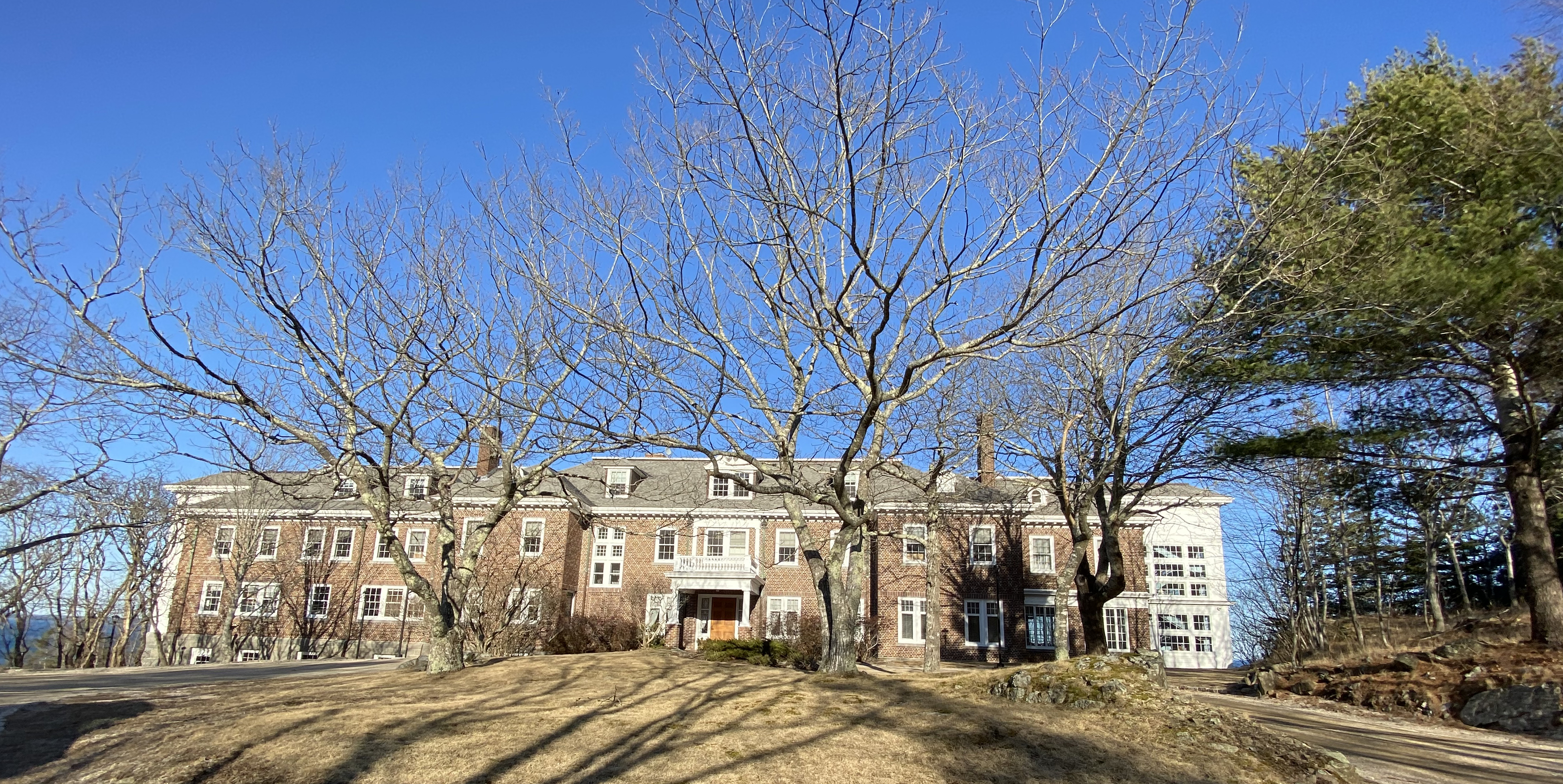
- Highseas in Bar Harbor, Maine

- Location within Maine Location within the United States
- Nearest city: Bar Harbor, Maine
- Coordinates: 44°21′21″N 68°11′1″W
- Area: 0.8 acres (0.32 ha)
- Built: 1912
- Architect: Frederick Lincoln Savage
- Architectural style: Colonial Revival
- NRHP reference No.: 78000326
- Added to NRHP: November 30, 1978

Highseas is a historic early 20th-century summer estate in Bar Harbor, Maine. It is located on Schooner Head Road on the east side of Mount Desert Island, surrounded by the lands of Acadia National Park. Built in 1912, it is one of the few grand summer estates to survive the island's devastating 1947 fire. It is now owned by the Jackson Laboratory and used as housing for students enrolled in its prestigious Summer Student Program. The property was listed on the National Register of Historic Places in 1978.

== Description and history ==
Highseas is set on a bluff overlooking Frenchman Bay south of the main village of Bar Harbor. It is a massive Colonial Revival structure, 2 1/2 stories in height, built out of brick laid in tapestry bond, with a hip roof and a granite foundation; the brick was manufactured in Philadelphia. The roof is topped by a deck with railing, and is pierced by five brick chimneys and numerous dormers with gabled or hipped roofs. The building is roughly rectangular and its block is ten bays in width, with flanking wings of decreasing size. Most of the windows are sash, although the south wing is set up as a solarium with large casement windows. The main entrance is on the west side of the building, sheltered by a single-story portico with Ionic columns and a railing around its top. The entry area is flanked by projecting hip-roof sections. The east side of the building, facing the bay, has a single-story porch extending across the center six bays, supported by an Ionic colonnade.

Highseas was designed by local architect Frederick Lincoln Savage and built in 1912 for Rudolph Brunnow, a professor at Princeton University. He sold it in 1924 to Mrs. Eva Van Cortland Hawkes, a wealthy heiress and descendant of Gouverneur Morris. Her heirs donated the property to Jackson Laboratory, which has facilities nearby in Bar Harbor. The laboratory now uses the property as housing for summer students.

== See also ==
- National Register of Historic Places listings in Hancock County, Maine
- List of Gilded Age mansions in Maine
