= Asticou Hotel =

Historic inn in Maine, United States

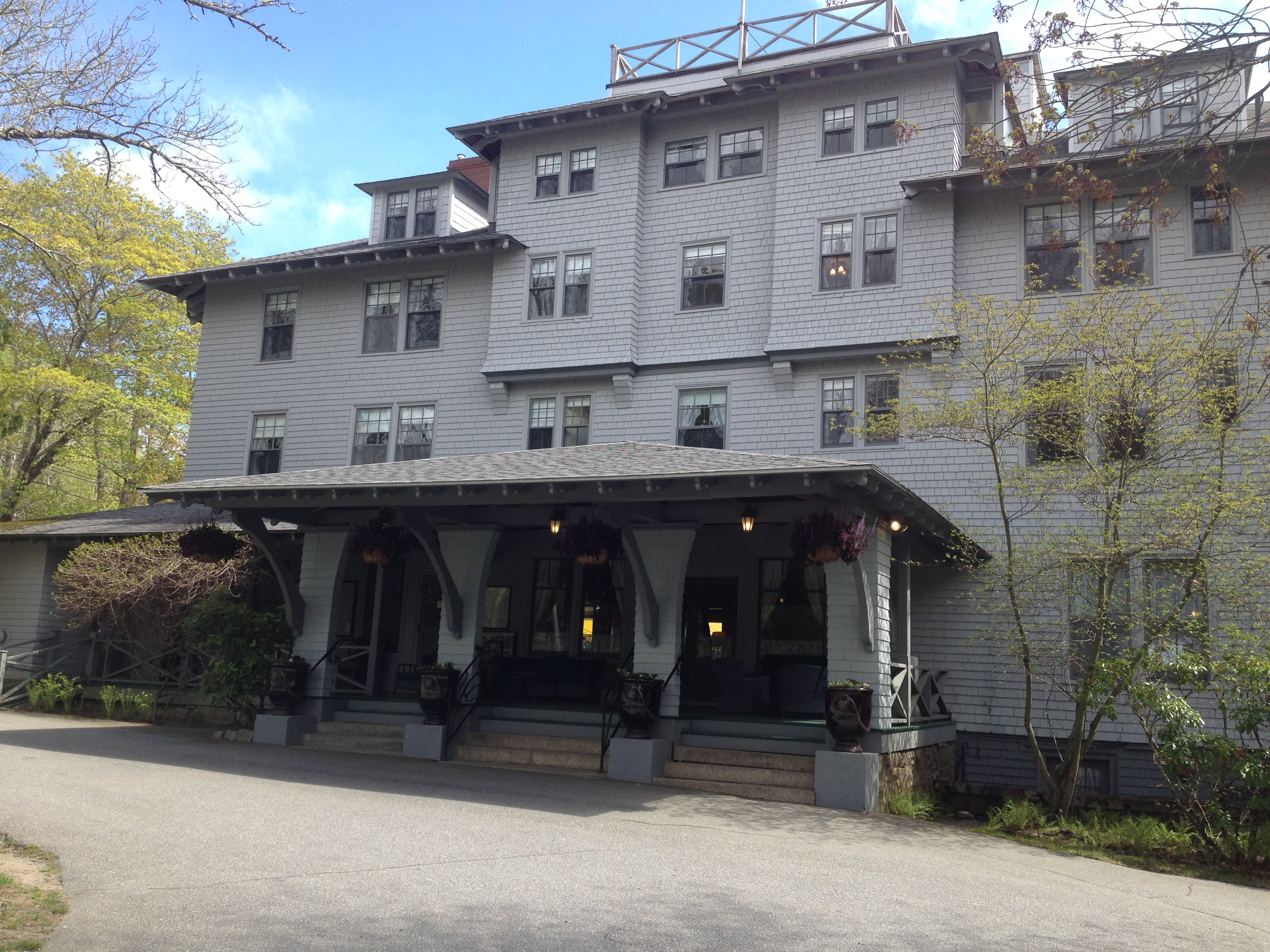
- The main entrance of the inn, prior to the building's 2024 renovation
- Interactive map of the Asticou Hotel area
- Former names: Asticou Inn (1883–2015)

General information
- Location: Northeast Harbor, Maine, 15 Peabody Drive; Northeast Harbor, Maine 04662
- Coordinates: 44.3035°N 68.2819°W
- Opening: Originally: 1883; Rebuilt: 1901 (125 years ago)
- Owner: Kennebunkport Resort Collection

Technical details
- Floor count: 4 (in main inn)
- Lifts/elevators: 1

Design and construction
- Architect: Frederick Lincoln Savage
- Developer: Augustus Chase Savage

Other information
- Number of rooms: 50
- Number of restaurants: 1
- Number of bars: 1
- Facilities: swimming pool clay tennis courts
- Parking: yes

Website
- www.asticoumaine.com

The Asticou Hotel is a hotel in Northeast Harbor, Maine. It was built in 1883. In 1899, it was destroyed by fire and rebuilt over the course of two years.

The rear of the building overlooks the Northeast Harbor inlet, which opens out to the Atlantic Ocean.

The inn has been owned by the Asti-Kim Corporation since 1965 and, between 2015 and 2019, was managed by the Acadia Corporation. Tim Harrington's Kennebunkport Resort Collection, which also owns the Claremont Hotel in Southwest Harbor, became the current managers of the inn in 2023. The inn began a major $10 million renovation in early 2024, involving the removal of the rear and front porches. It was closed for the remainder of 2024, with an expected opening of June 2025. The cost of the renovation was updated to $28 million.

There are 50 guest rooms: 33 in the main inn, plus 17 in six adjacent buildings: Cranberry Lodge, Blue Spruce, Bird Bank, and three "Topsiders".

The inn closes for the seven months between Columbus Day (late October) and Memorial Day (late May).

After renovations completed in 2025, the business was renamed from the Asticou Inn to the Asticou Hotel.

== History ==
Around 1820, John Savage II (1801–1868), son of John and Sarah Savage, 1798 settlers in Northeast Harbor, built a farmhouse on the site now occupied by the inn. Known as the Old House, he lived there with his wife, Bath, Maine, native Climena (1801–1884). After being moved a short distance to accommodate the building of the inn, the farmhouse was later moved to Asticou Way, across Peabody Drive, where it stood until it was torn down in February 2013 after standing intact for almost 200 years.

John Savage had seven children, but the only one to survive into maturity was son Augustus Chase ("A.C.") Savage (1832–1911). (One of his others sons, Samuel Tyler, was killed in 1865 at the age of 23 shortly after returning home from the Civil War, while the other sons died of tuberculosis and other diseases. Each of the daughters died young.) Augustus lived with his wife, Emily Manchester (1834–1914), in the 1854-built Harbor Cottage (now Cranberry Lodge), which sits near the apex of the corner of Peabody Drive (almost directly across from both Blue Spruce and Bird Bank, which are the other two "Asticou Cottages" that are part of the inn). A.C. and Emily Savage had eight children.

Savage correctly predicted that an overflow of vacationers to Bar Harbor would greatly benefit Northeast Harbor. In 1883, across the road from Harbor Cottage, he built the Asticou Inn. (The name Asticou comes from a Penobscot Indian word believed to mean boiling kettle.)

Asticou Inn, Fred Savage's Hilltop Cottage, and Harbor Cottage, around 1895 — four years before a fire destroyed the inn

The original building was destroyed by a fire 16 years after opening. It was rebuilt by A.C. and his son, George (1873–1922). Another of A.C.'s sons, Frederick Lincoln Savage (1861–1924), was the architect. It reopened in 1901. The inn was spared during the great fires of 1947.

The combined Savage families took active parts in the day-to-day management of the business, with the women establishing the inn's reputation for hearty New England food and the children picking berries that contributed to desserts and pies.

George Savage died in 1922, aged about 48. His 19-year-old son, Charles Kenneth Savage (1903–1979), was brought back from his boarding school in Boston, Massachusetts, to help his mother, Mabelle (1877–1965), maintain the inn's tradition.

When Charles married, his wife, Katharine Larcher Savage (1905–2001), became the manager of the inn's kitchen, and her pastries, breads, ice creams and desserts proved very popular. Charles and Katharine ran the inn until 1964. They had a daughter, Mary Ann Savage Habib, and a son, C. Kenneth Savage Jr.

In 1956, Savage created the Asticou Azalea Garden across the street from the inn.

Some members of the Savage family were initially interred in a family cemetery around where the cottages Blue Spruce and Bird Bank stand today. They were moved to Forest Hill Cemetery, on the other side of the azalea garden, which was created by A.C. Savage in 1904. Frederick Savage, meanwhile, is buried in Ledgelawn Cemetery on Cromwell Harbor Road, along with his wife of 23 years, Alice (1879–1961), who survived him by 37 years.

In 1965, when Mabelle Savage died, ownership of the inn passed from the Savage family to the Asti-Kim Corporation, a group of local businesspeople and summer residents.

=== Later personnel ===
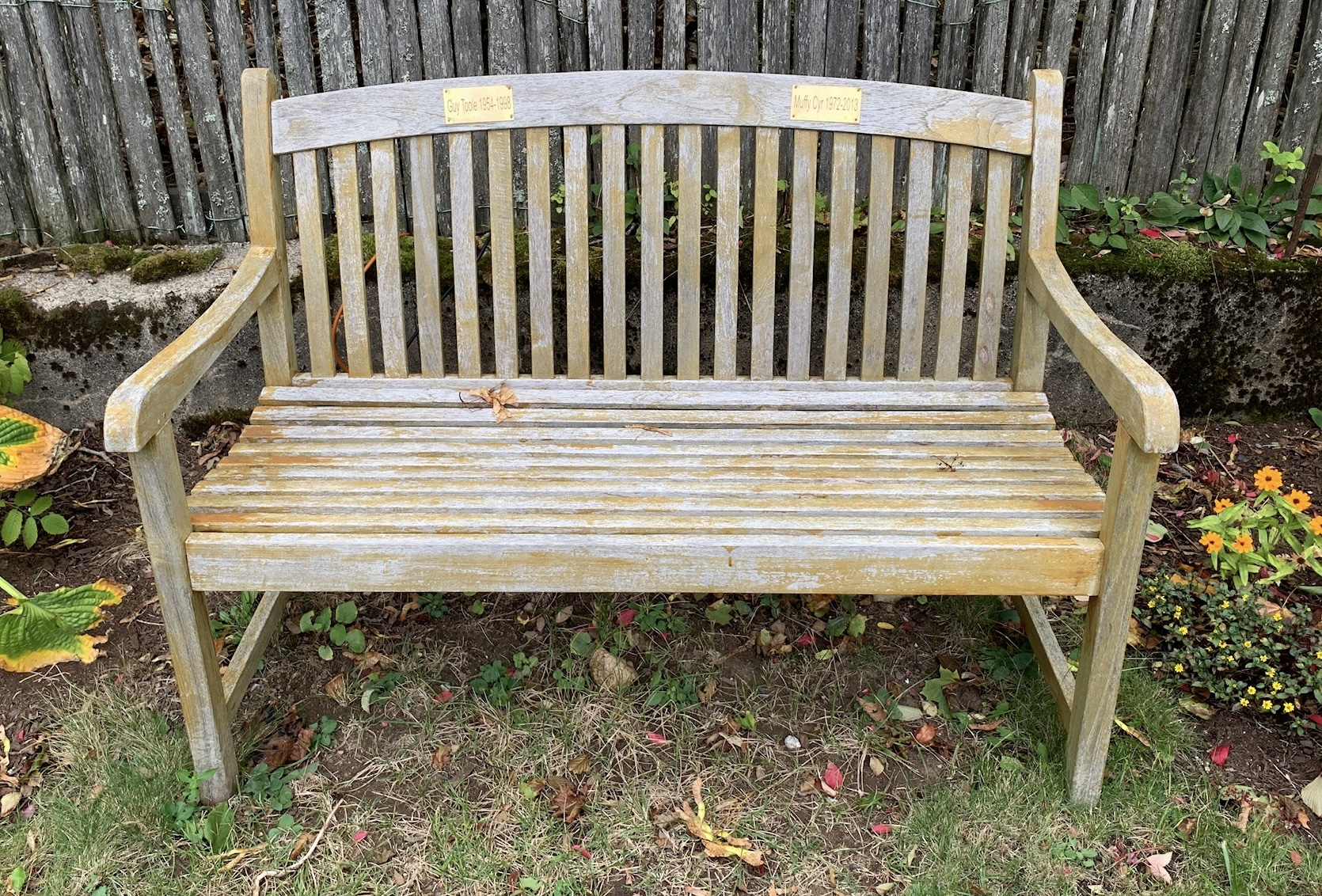
A bench at the inn commemorating the services of Guy Toole and Muffy Cyr

Richard M. Savage, a seventh-generation family member of the inn's founders (his grandfather was John C. Savage, one of A.C. Savage's eight children), was its general manager up until the early 21st century. Savage's son, Tom, died unexpectedly in 2020 at the age of 46.

Guy Toole (1938–1998) was an employee at the inn for 44 consecutive seasons (1954 to 1998). He was hired as a teenaged potwasher by Katharine Savage, eventually progressing to become the inn's concierge.

Marilyn "Muffy" Cyr (1950–2015) worked at the inn for 41 years (1972 to 2013) in various capacities, including chambermaid, head housekeeper, desk clerk, reservations manager, special functions assistant and floral arranger. For the latter part of her time at the inn, Tom Weverstad was the special-functions director.

== Gallery ==
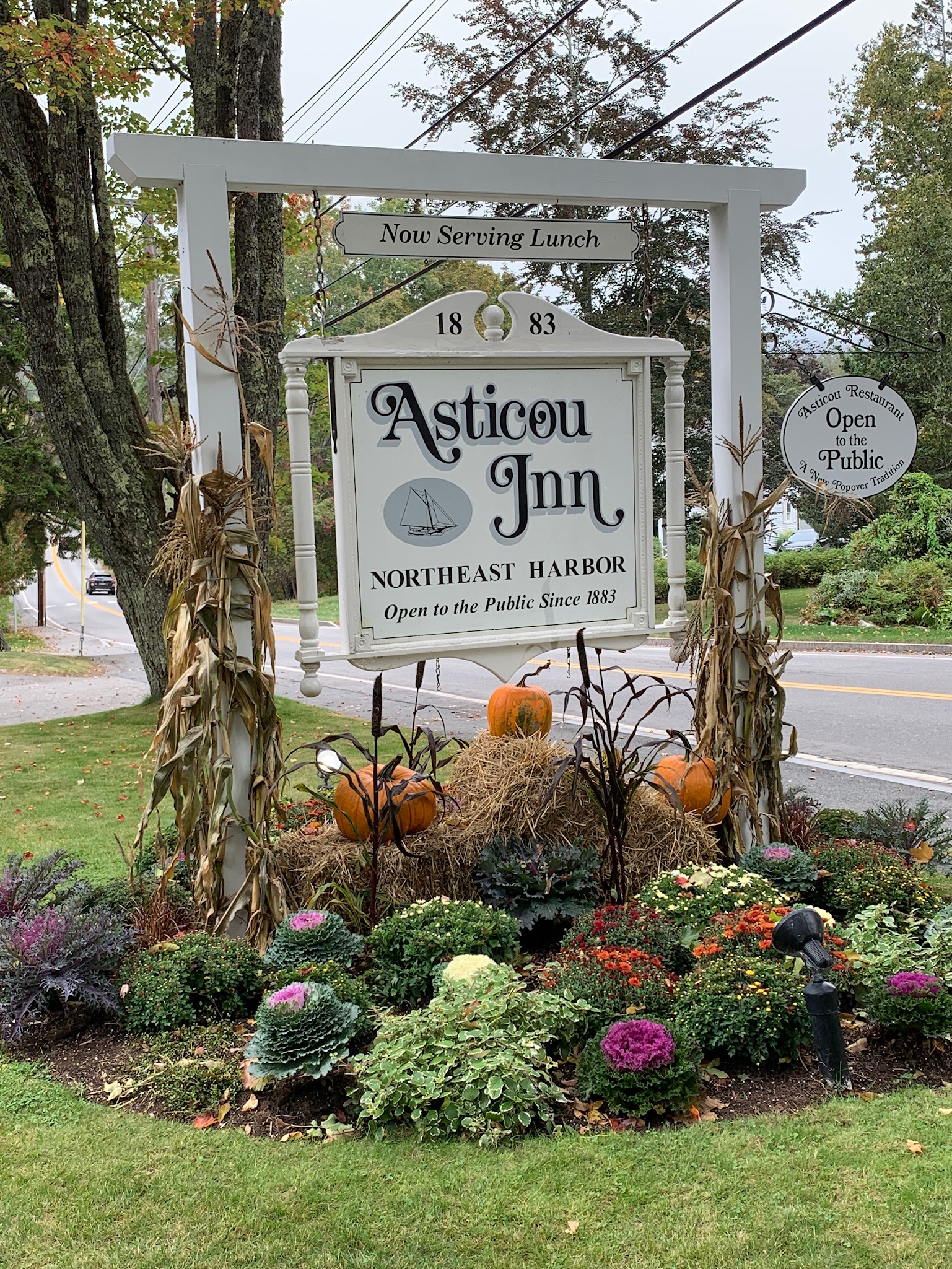
The hotel's former welcome sign

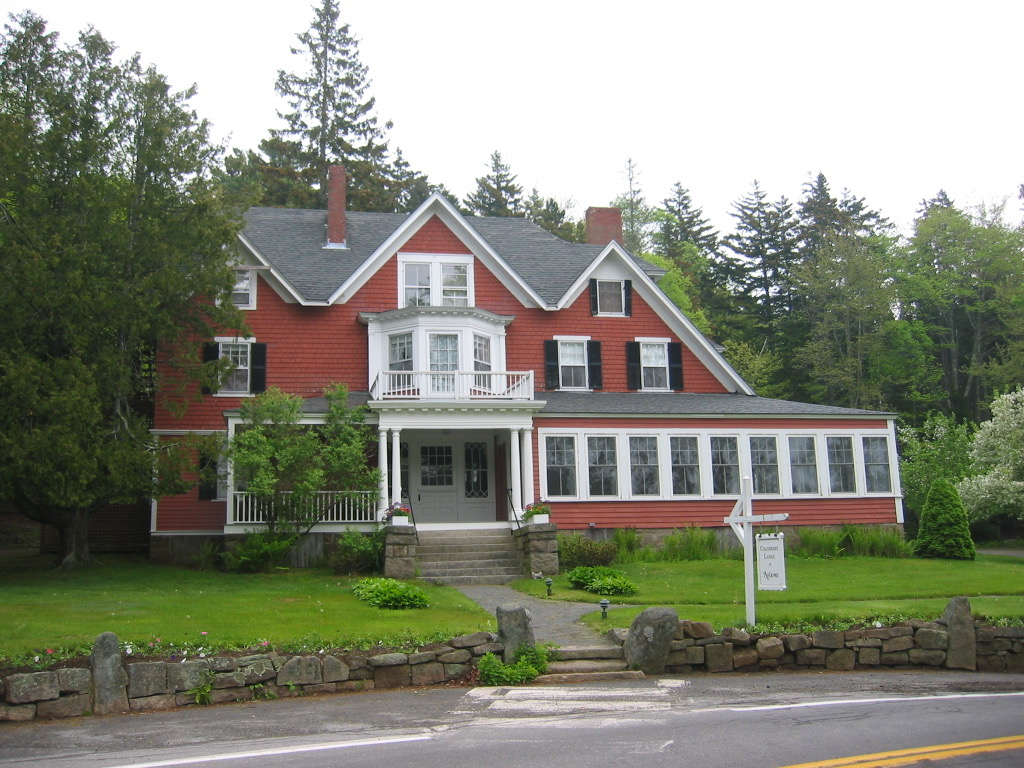
Cranberry Lodge, one of the inn's six adjacent accommodations. The section from the steps and to the right is the original part of the structure

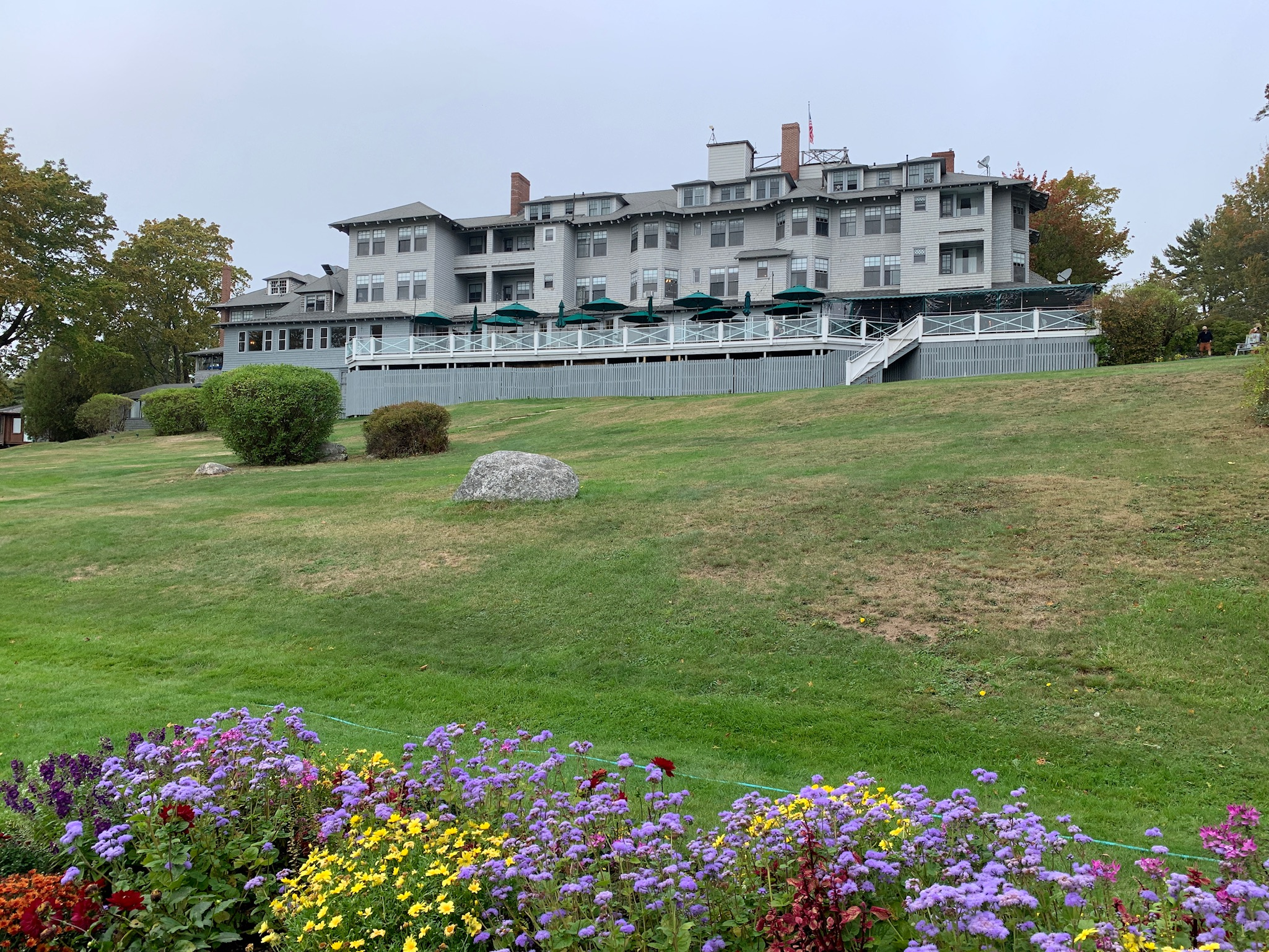
The rear of the inn, viewed in 2020

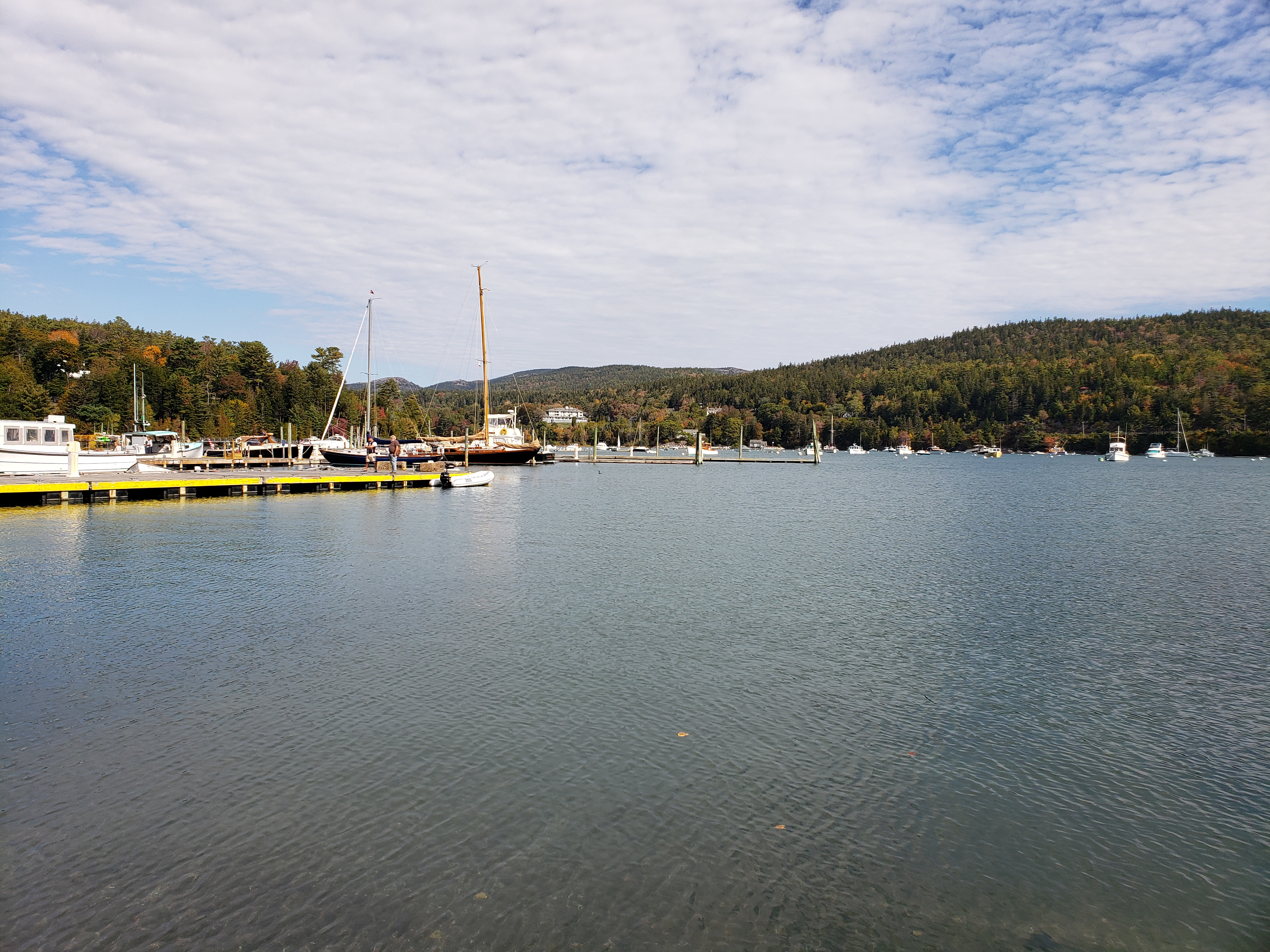
The inn viewed from the Northeast Harbor marina

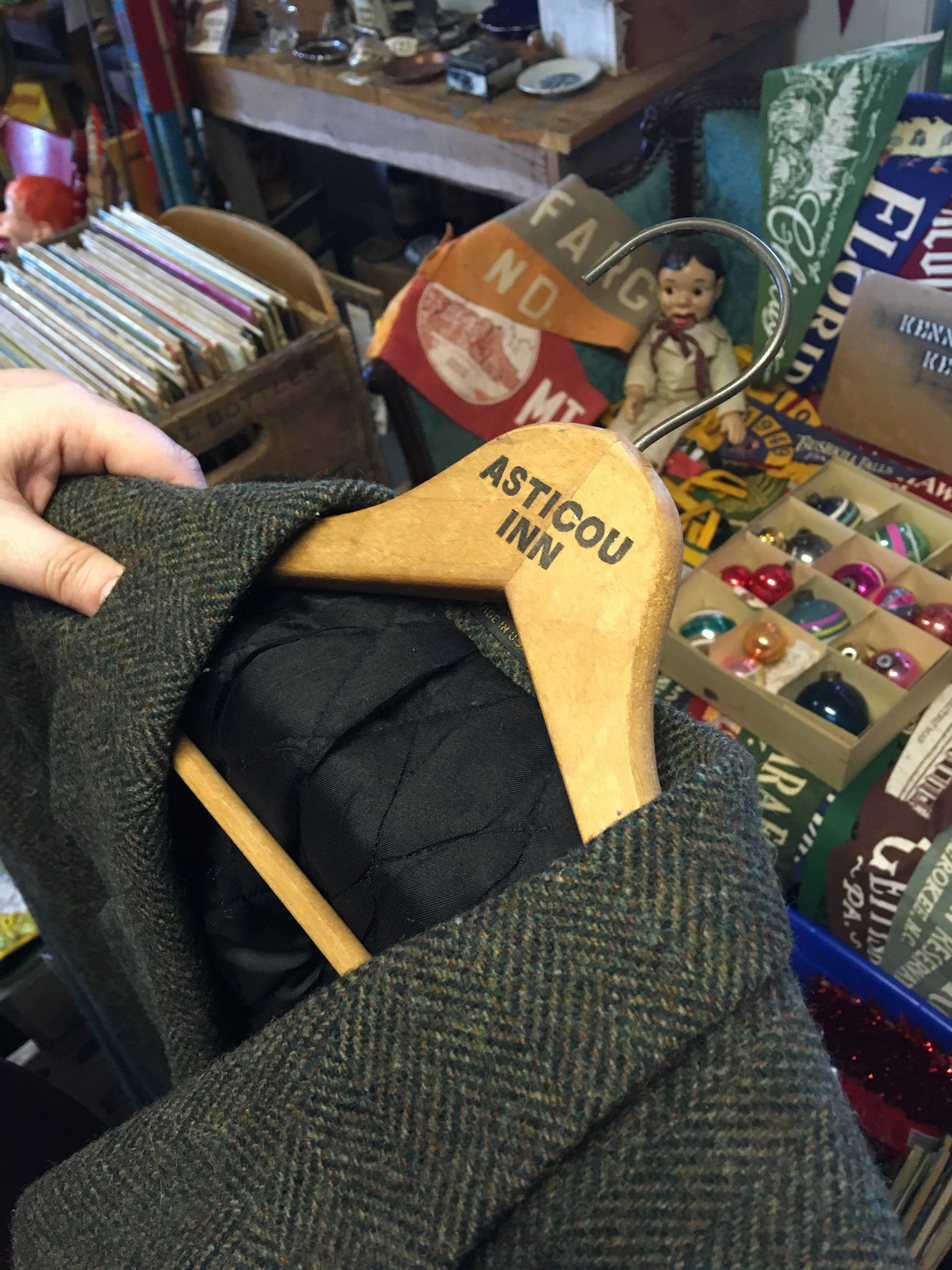
An original clothes hanger from the inn
