= Asticou Azalea Garden =

Japanese-influenced garden in Maine, U.S.

Coordinates: 44.305°N 68.284°W

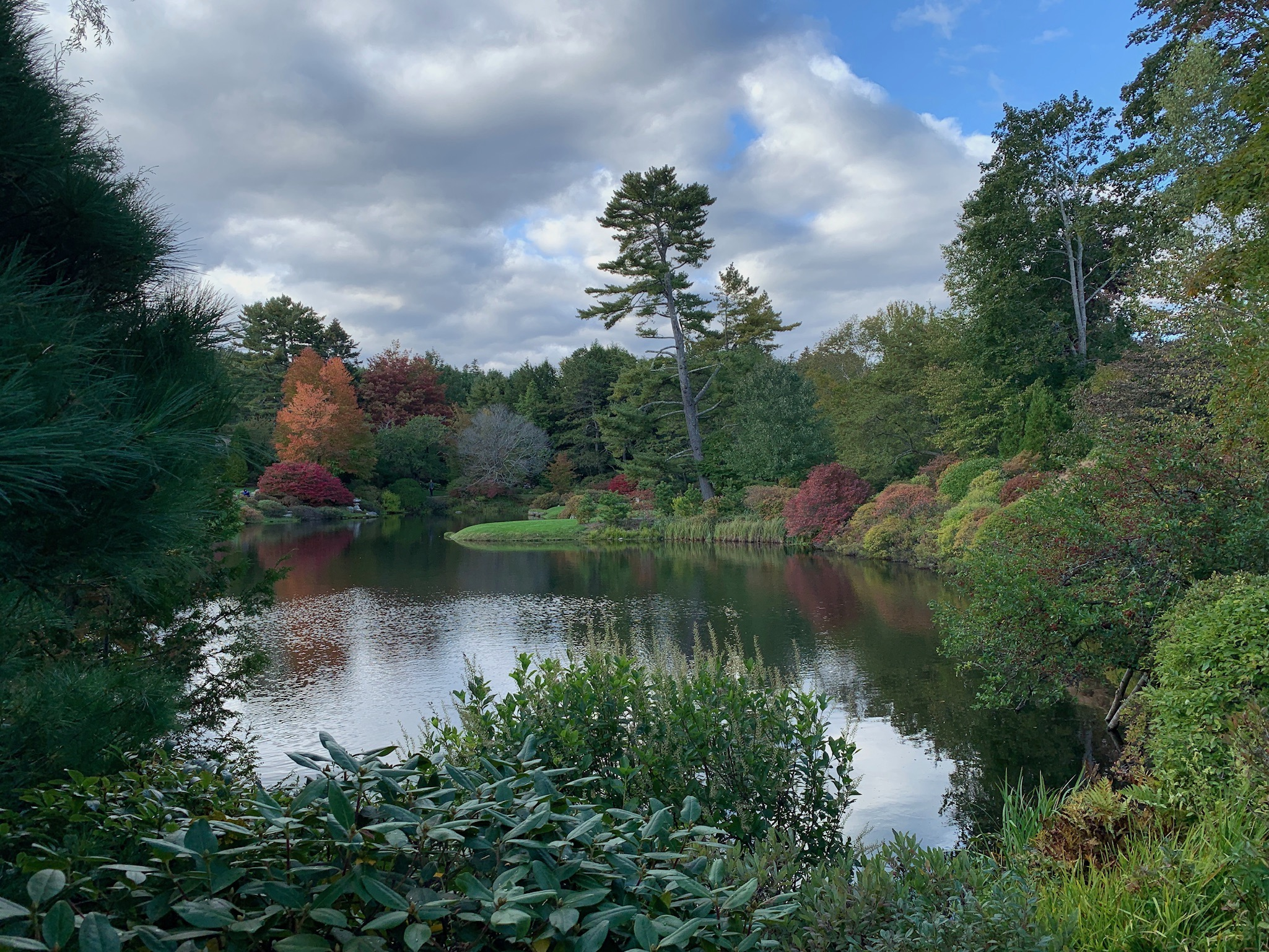
- An October 2019 view across Asticou Pond from Peabody Drive
- Interactive map of Asticou Azalea Garden
- Location: Route 198, Northeast Harbor, Maine
- Area: 2.3 acres (0.93 ha)
- Established: 1956 (70 years ago)
- Parking: Free, on-site
- Website: www.gardenpreserve.org/asticou-azalea-garden/index.html

The Asticou Azalea Garden in Northeast Harbor, Maine, United States, is a popular visitor attraction. It was created by lifelong resident of the village, Charles Kenneth Savage, in 1956. Much of the initial plant collection originated at Reef Point Estate in nearby Bar Harbor, the summer residence of renowned landscape architect Beatrix Farrand. The collection was moved with the financial assistance of John D. Rockefeller Jr., including the weeping hemlock, just north of the main bridge.

Located at the intersection of Route 198 and Route 3 (Peabody Drive), the 2.3 acres (0.93 ha) garden and its pond are open to the public during daylight hours from May 1 to October 31. It features a selection of rhododendrons and azaleas, including the Rhododendron canadense, Maine's native azalea. Styled after a Japanese stroll garden, the fine-gravel paths are raked regularly in a manner that suggests flowing water. There is also a sand garden, where this effect is repeated but with the addition of stones, which are meant to represent islands.

Savage was also the owner of the Asticou Inn, which is located on the opposite side of Peabody Drive. Prior to the establishment of the garden, the Savage children and grandchildren had made a treehouse and rope swing in the white pine still standing today. The present-day pond was formerly surrounded by an alder swamp.

Group photographs for weddings at the inn are often taken in the Garden.

== Gallery ==
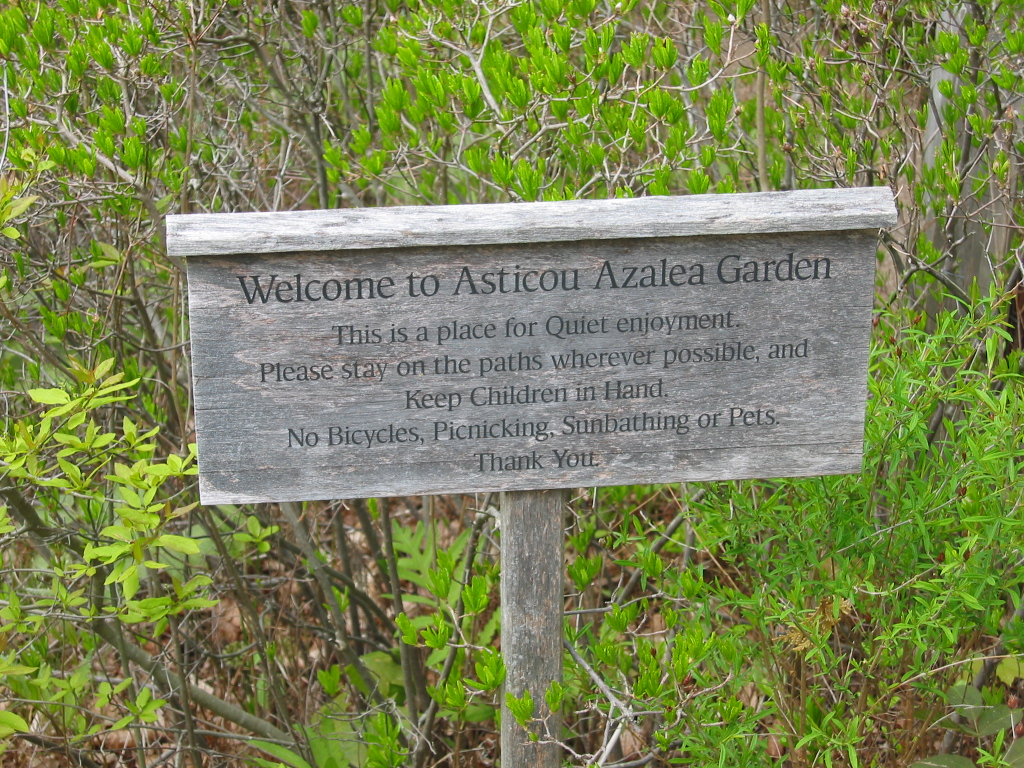
A sign at the entrance from the Routes 3/198 parking lot near the northeast corner of the Garden

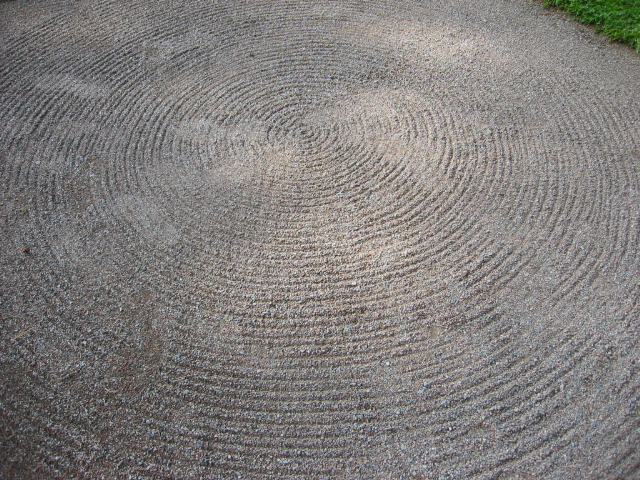
Concentric circles in the sand garden

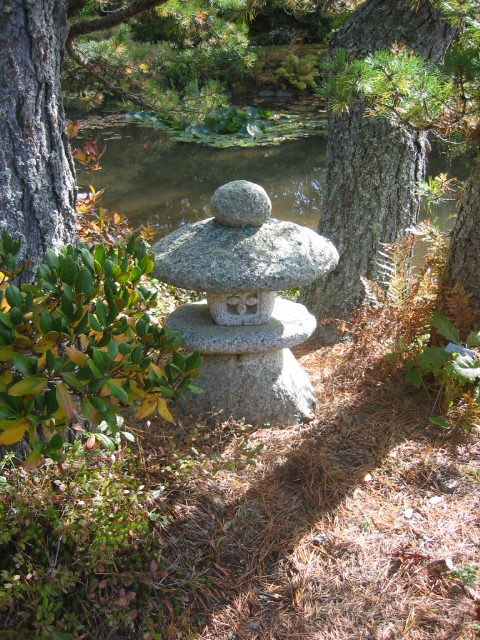
An example of the Japanese influence

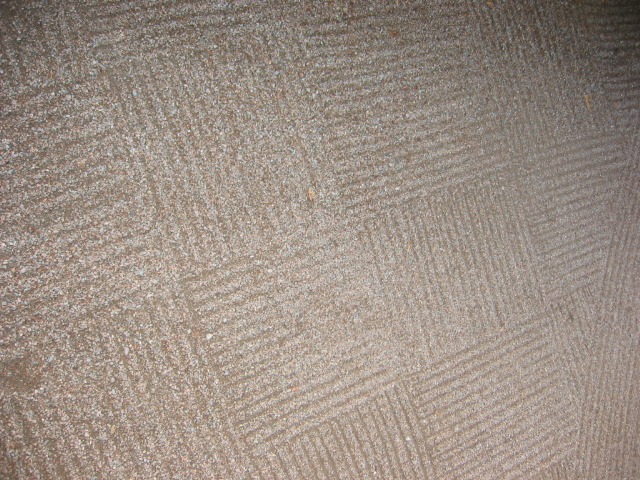
More raking effects

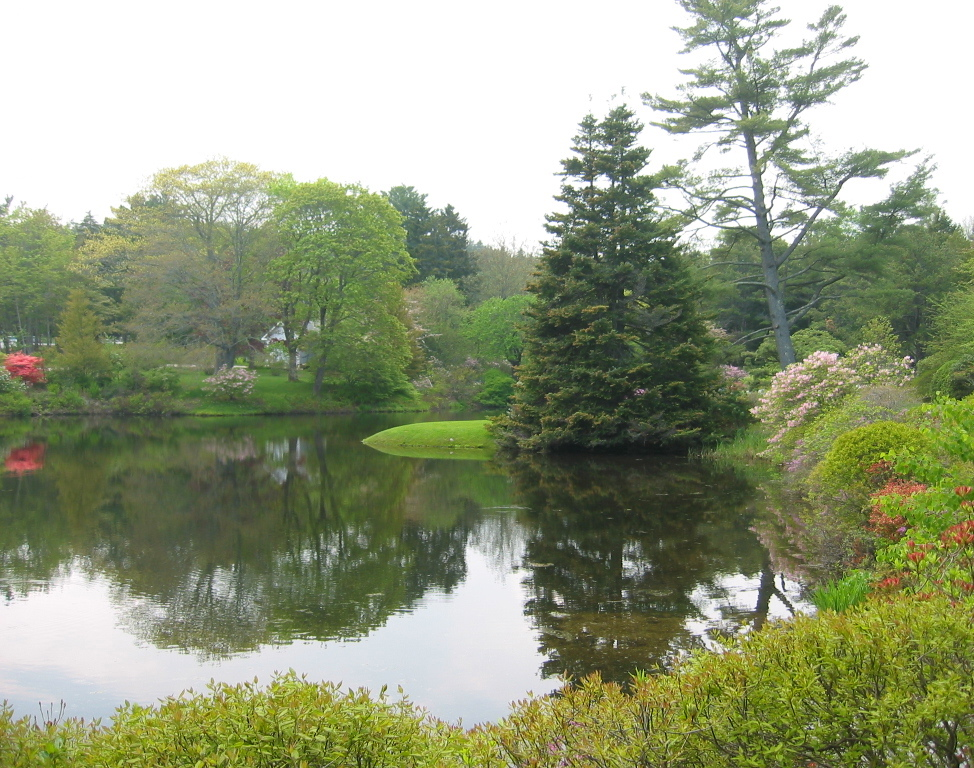
A 2006 view from just inside the Peabody Drive entrance
