= John Innes Kane Cottage =

Historic house in Maine, United States

- U.S. National Register of Historic Places
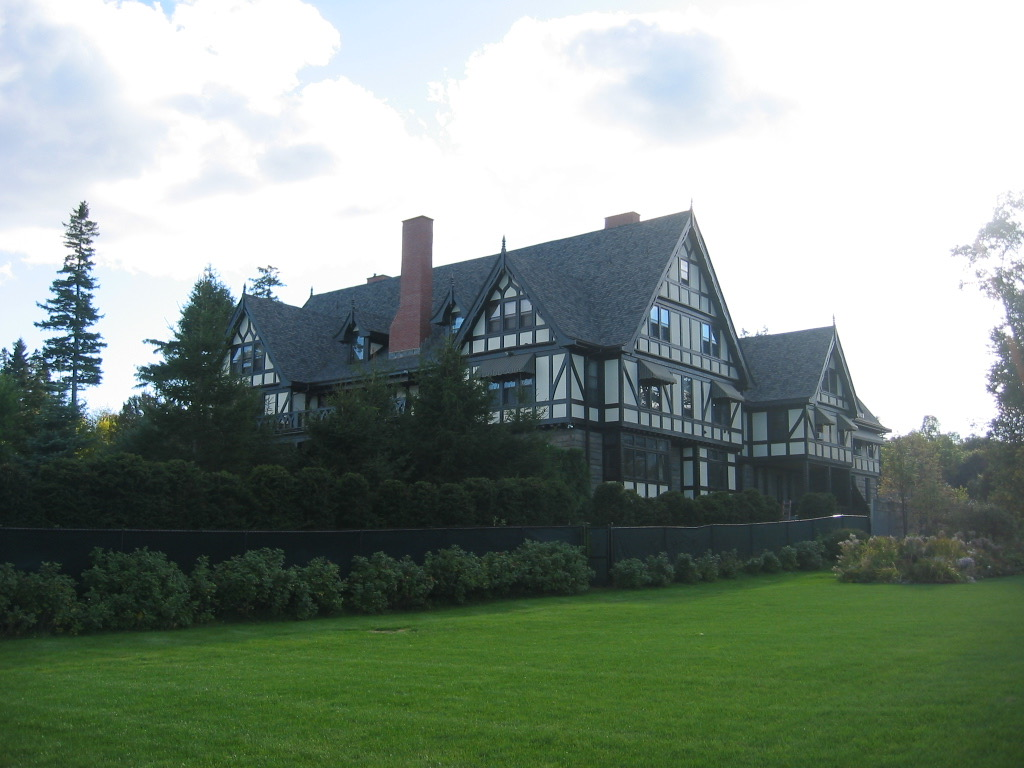
- The building viewed from Bar Harbor's Shore Path in 2016

- Location within Maine Location within the United States
- Location: Off SE end of Hancock St., Bar Harbor, Maine
- Coordinates: 44°23′9″N 68°11′53″W
- Area: 3.9 acres (1.6 ha)
- Built: 1904
- Architect: Fred L. Savage
- Architectural style: Tudor Revival
- NRHP reference No.: 92000275
- Added to NRHP: March 26, 1992

The John Innes Kane Cottage, also known as Breakwater and Atlantique, is a historic summer estate house at 45 Hancock Street in Bar Harbor, Maine. Built in 1903-04 for John Innes Kane, a wealthy grandson of John Jacob Astor and designed by local architect Fred L. Savage, it is one of a small number of estate houses to escape Bar Harbor's devastating 1947 fire. An imposing example of Tudor Revival architecture, it was listed on the National Register of Historic Places in 1992.

== Description and history ==
The Kane Cottage is set on a nearly 4-acre (1.6 ha) parcel of land on a bluff overlooking Frenchman Bay, near the village of Bar Harbor. It is a large 2 1/2-story structure, built of stone through the first floor, and of wood-frame construction finished in the half-timbered Tudor Revival style on the upper floors. It is roughly L-shaped with a complex cross-gabled roof configuration. Gable ends are typically decorated with vergeboard and pendants below the roofline and finials above, and the eaves of the roofline are flared. The western facade presents the land-side entrance, which is set under a projecting gable-roofed portico supported by heavy wooden timbers. The eastern facade faces the water, and is composed symmetrically, with outer cross gables flanking a porch area in the center. A servant's wing extends west from the northern end of the building.

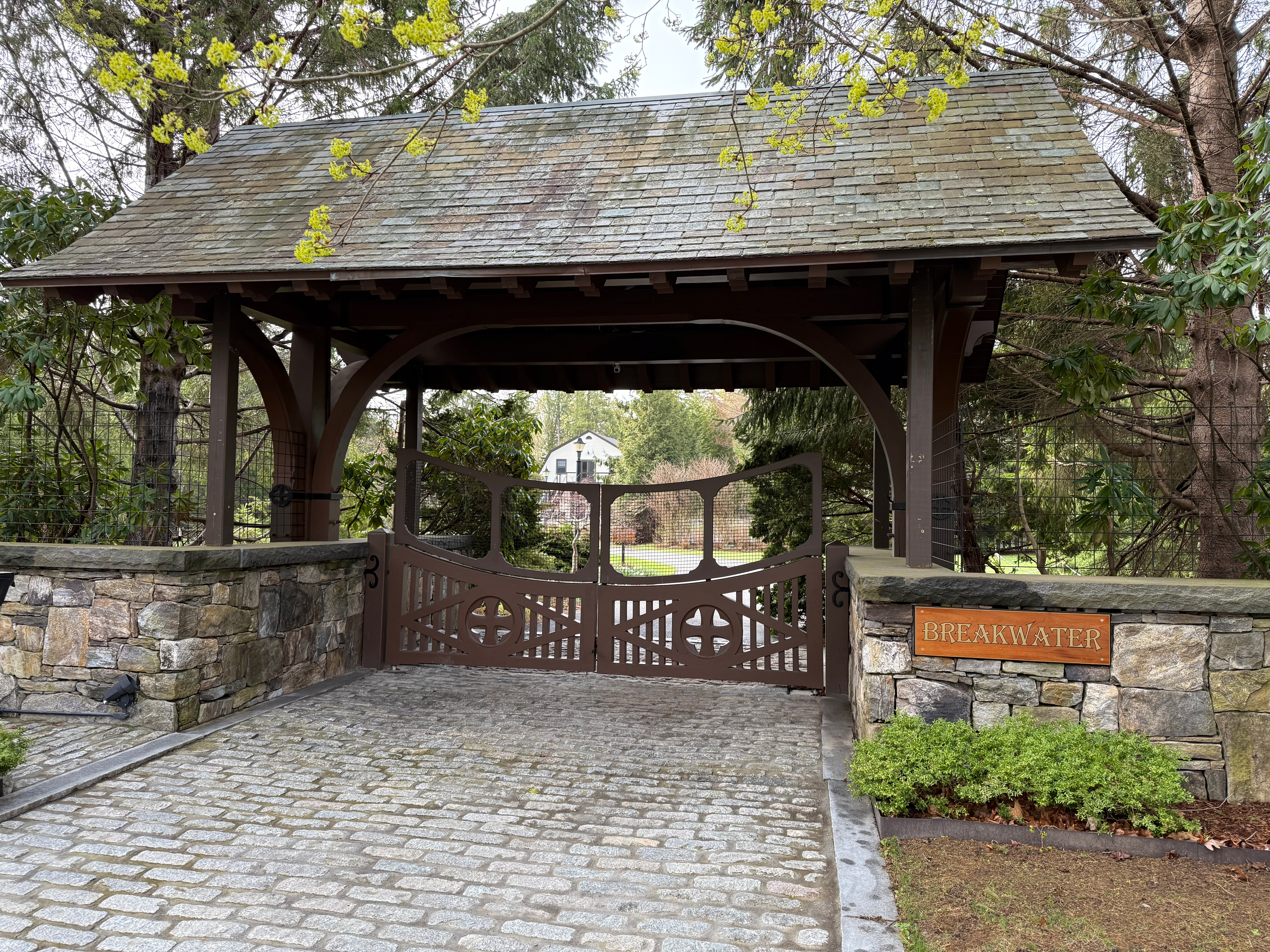
The gate to the property, on Hancock Street.

Although the exterior is clearly Tudor Revival in character, the interior has essentially Colonial Revival styling applied to a Tudor Revival layout. The entry leads into a great hall, from which other living areas are accessed via stairs and hallways. The great hall is lavishly decorated with Colonial Revival woodwork, including Tuscan columns, paneling, and crown molding. Similar details, although less elaborate, are also found in the private spaces upstairs. A parlor space lies on the ocean side south of the great hall, with a library behind. The dining room is north of the great hall, with the giant hearth obscuring the entry into the butler's pantry, which connects the dining room to the kitchen spaces in the service wing. The estate includes the original carriage house and caretaker's house, which were built at the same time as the main house.

The Kane Cottage was designed by local architect Fred L. Savage and built in 1903-04 for John Innes Kane, a wealthy socialite who was a great-grandson of John Jacob Astor. In 1926, the home was inherited by a nephew, Peter Augustus Jay, who sold it in 1955 to Mr. and Mrs. Alfred Wilson of Michigan. (Matilda Dodge Wilson was the widow of John Dodge of the Dodge Motor Company, and one of the richest women in the world.) Mr. Robert Evans acquired the estate in 1962 and was the sole owner until his death in 1991. Under his ownership, the cottage deteriorated significantly.

== See also ==
- National Register of Historic Places listings in Hancock County, Maine
