= Northeast Harbor, Maine =

Village in Maine, United States

Northeast Harbor
- Interactive map of Northeast Harbor
- Coordinates: 44°17′39″N 68°17′23″W

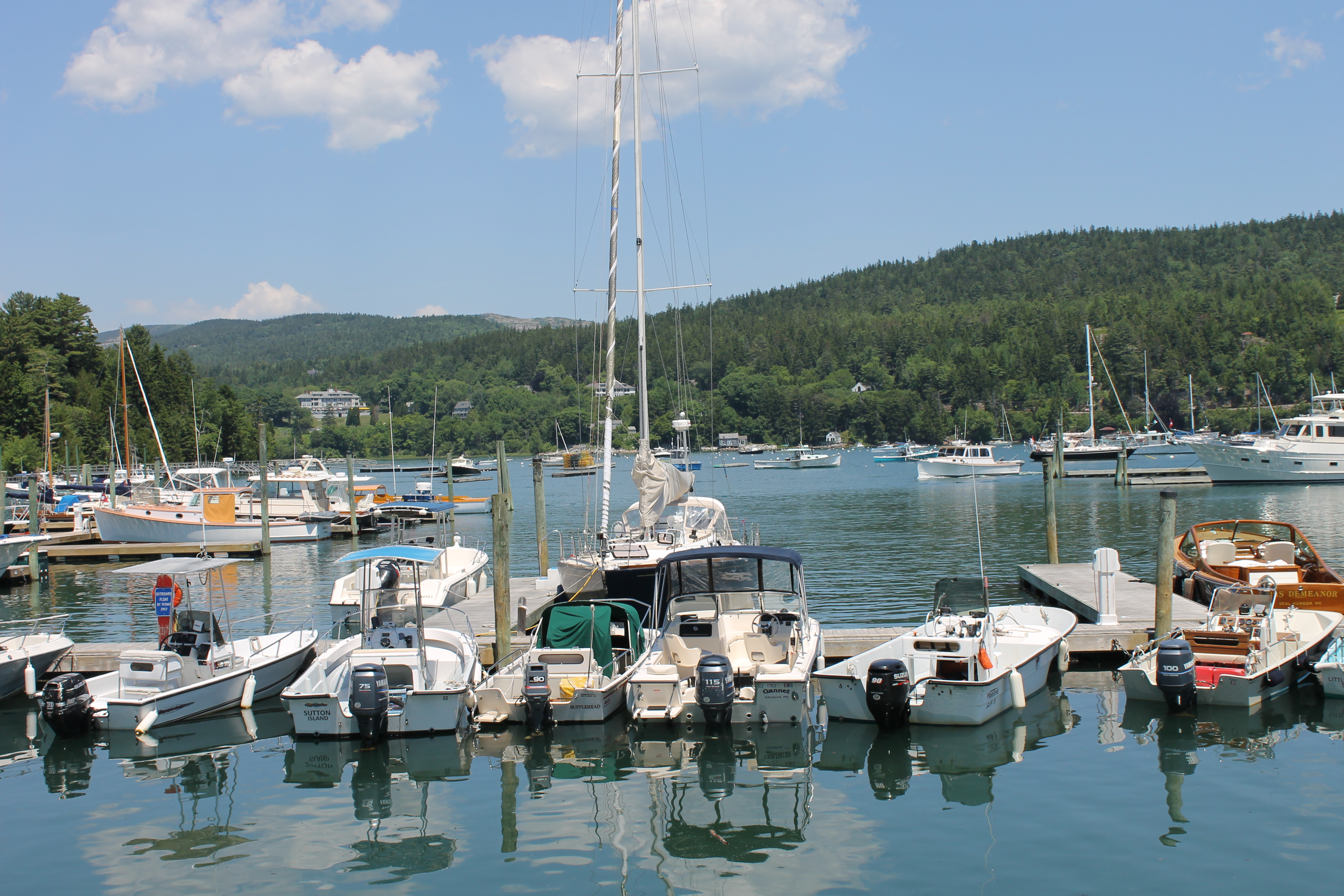
Boats docked at Northeast Harbor. The Asticou Hotel is in view on the left of the picture

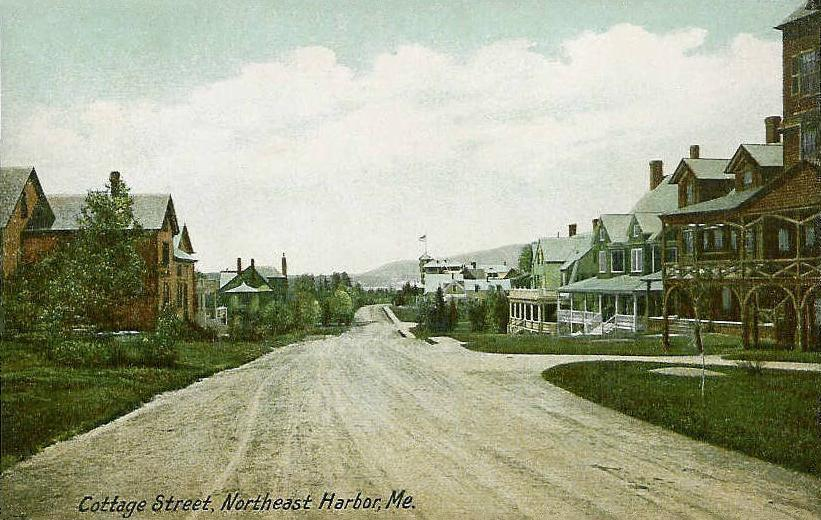
Northeast Harbor (c. 1905)

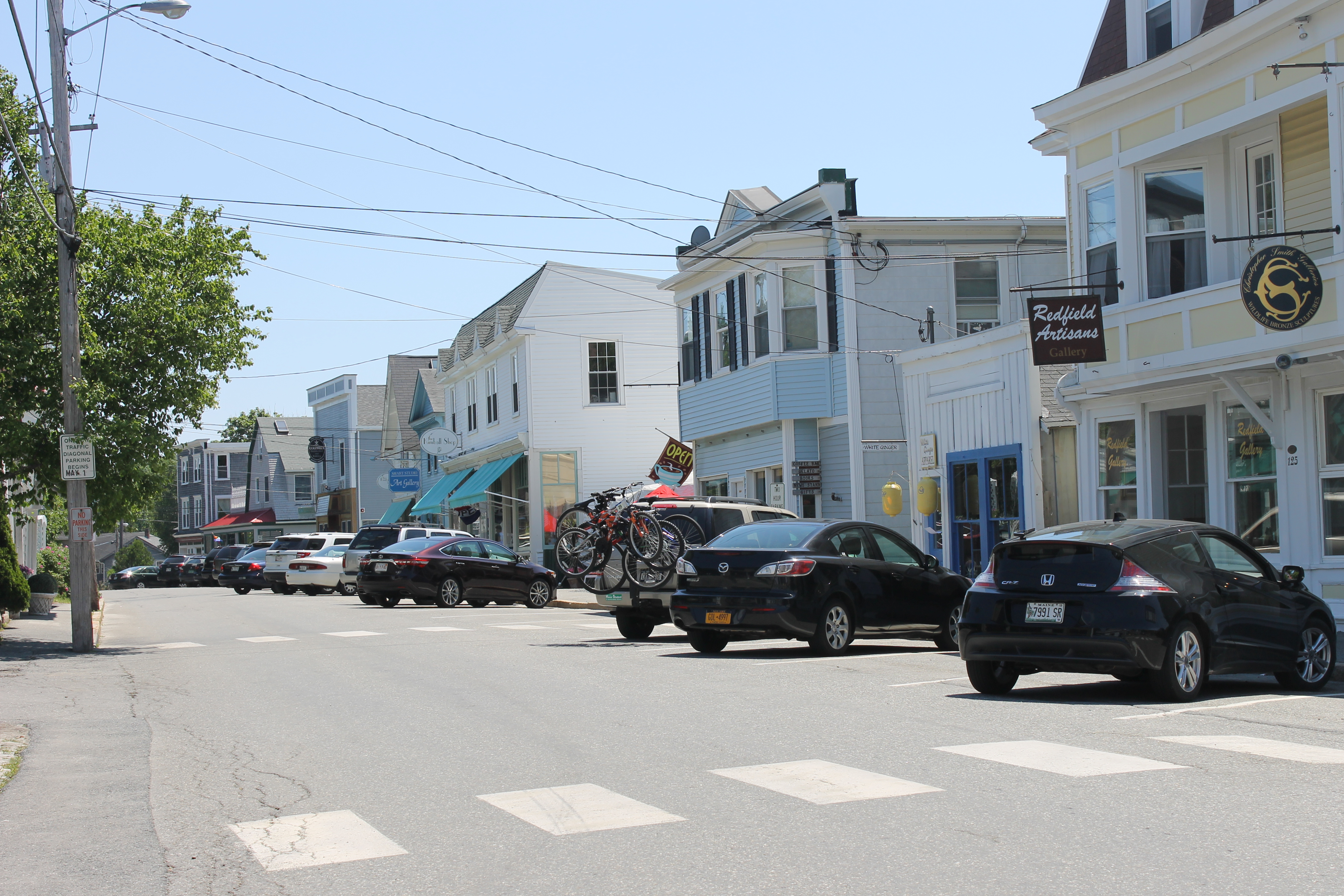
Northeast Harbor (2014)

Northeast Harbor is a village on Mount Desert Island, located in the town of Mount Desert in Hancock County, Maine, United States.

The village has a significant summer population, and has long been a quiet enclave of the rich and famous. Summer residents include the Rockefeller family. The village was once so popular as a summer resort among Philadelphians, including members of the Clark banking family, that it was sometimes known as "Philadelphia on the rocks".

Landmarks include the Asticou Hotel, the Asticou Azalea Garden, and Thuya Garden at the village's eastern entrance; Main Street, home to a variety of shops and restaurants; and the Marina, home to more than 200 yachts during the summertime.

Its ZIP code is 04662. Its area code is 207, exchange 276.

== History ==
The original settlers, the Someses and Richardsons, arrived circa 1761. The Asticou Inn—today's Asticou Hotel—was built by Augustus Chase ("A.C.") Savage (1832–1911), grandson of Glaswegian John C. Savage (1756–1816), who moved to the United States in 1770 and to Northeast Harbor in 1792.

In December 1966, a fire destroyed Wallace's Esso Garage, the Pastime Theater, the Hillcrest Market, and Mrs. Flye’s Sandwich Shop.

In 2008, a fire destroyed three buildings on Main Street — Colonel's Deli and its upstairs apartments, and two art galleries. Five months later, in 2009, another blaze destroyed the Tan Turtle restaurant and its upstairs apartments. As of 2022, some buildings had yet to be rebuilt. The vacancies, along with a dwindling year-round population, led to the founding of the nonprofit community development organization MD365, which creates affordable housing and other incentives to attract new businesses and residents.

== Notable people ==
- Zbigniew Brzezinski, served as National Security Advisor during the Carter administration
- Mika Brzezinski, journalist and co-host of MSNBC's Morning Joe
- Barbara Bel Geddes, actress, best known for her starring role as Miss Ellie Ewing in the television series Dallas
- Gunnar Hansen, actor, best known for playing the mentally impaired cannibal Leatherface in the 1974 horror film The Texas Chain Saw Massacre
- Joe Scarborough, former U.S. Representative, journalist and co-host of MSNBC's Morning Joe
