= Reverie Cove =

Historic house in Maine, United States

- U.S. National Register of Historic Places
- U.S. Historic district – Contributing property
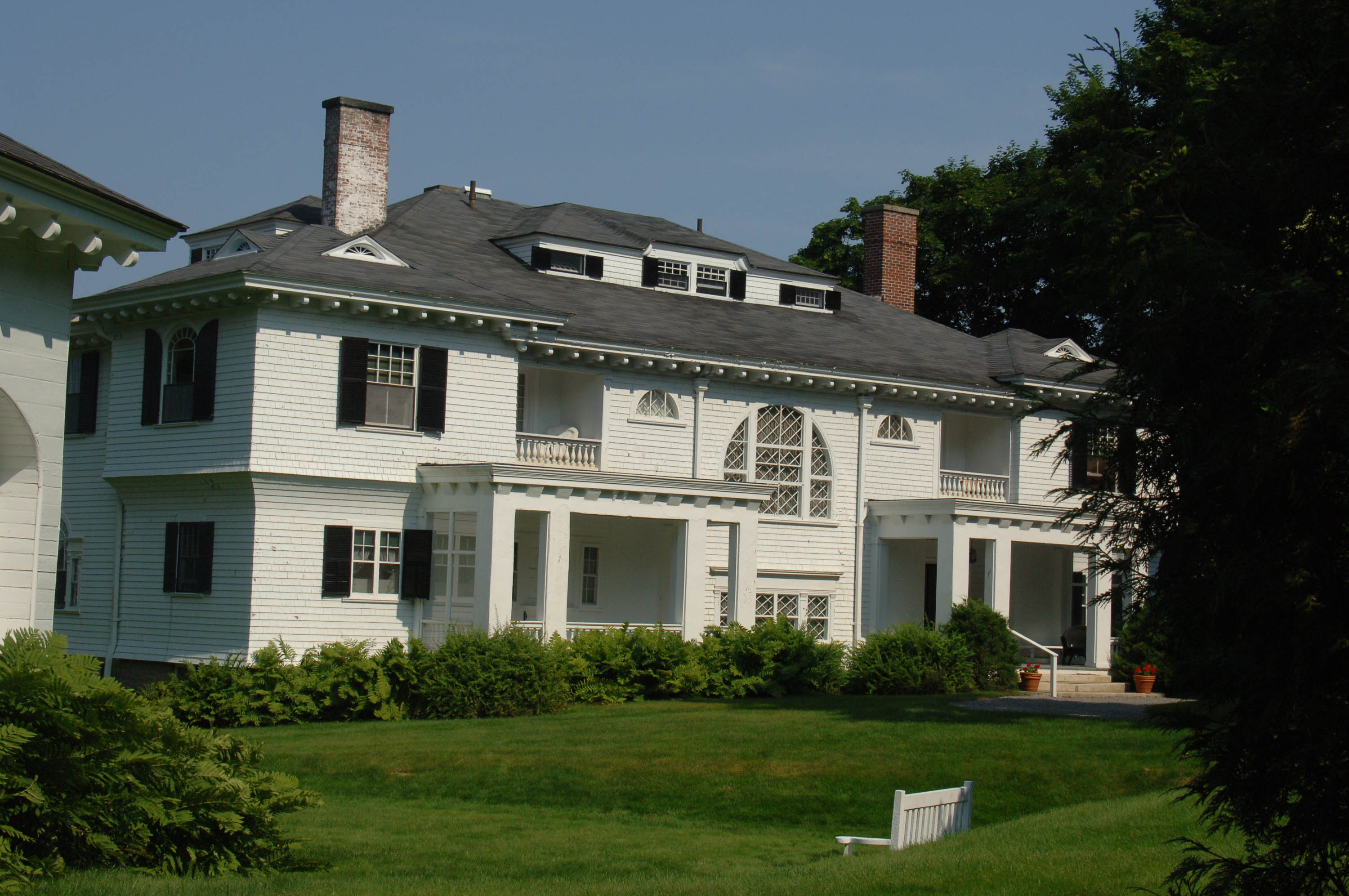

- Location within Maine Location within the United States
- Interactive map showing the location of Reverie Cove
- Location: Harbor Lane, Bar Harbor, Maine
- Coordinates: 44°23′25″N 68°12′56″W
- Area: 1 acre (0.40 ha)
- Built: 1895
- Built by: Savage, Fred L.
- Architectural style: Colonial Revival
- Part of: Harbor Lane-Eden Street Historic District (ID09000550)
- NRHP reference No.: 82000743

Significant dates
- Added to NRHP: February 19, 1982
- Designated CP: July 22, 2009

Reverie Cove is a historic summer estate on Harbor Lane in Bar Harbor, Maine. It was designed by local architect Fred L. Savage and built in 1895, and is a particularly opulent example of Colonial Revival architecture. A later owner of the property was New York City mayor Abram Hewitt. The house was listed on the National Register of Historic Places in 1982, and as part of the Harbor Lane-Eden Street Historic District in 2009.

== Description and history ==
Reverie Cove is set near the end of Harbor Lane, overlooking Frenchman Bay and eastward toward the village center of Bar Harbor. It is a large frame house 2 1/2 stories in front and 3 1/2 in back, with a complex hip roof, three brick chimneys, wooden shingle siding, and a granite foundation. The main facade faces west (away from the water), and is five bays wide, with projecting portico-like sections at both ends. Stylistically identical, one shelters the main entrance, while the other is a covered porch. Both are topped by recessed balconies, and are supported by paired large square columns. Between these porticos are a band of four diamond-pane sash windows, with a large round-arch diamond-pane window at the second level. Between this large window and the recessed balconies there are small half-round windows. At the outer corners of the facade are slightly projecting sections topped by hip-roof sections with eyebrow dormers. The half-story between these projections also has a low-profile hip-roof dormer. The eastern facade, facing the water, is also elaborate, with recessed balconies under arches at the center of the third level, and projecting semi-circular balconies at the second.

Reverie Cove was designed by local architect Fred L. Savage, noted for designing a number of Bar Harbor's other summer estate houses, and was completed in 1895. It was built for Dr. John Davies Jones of Washington, D.C. After Jones died in 1903, the house was purchased by Abram and Sarah Hewitt; he served as Mayor of New York City 1887–88. The property was one of a modest number of Bar Harbor's estate houses to survive a devastating 1947 wildfire ravaged the eastern half of Mount Desert Island. It was listed on the National Register of Historic Places in 1982, and was included in the Harbor Lane-Eden Street Historic District in 2009.

== See also ==
- National Register of Historic Places listings in Hancock County, Maine
