= Moore-Mayo House =

Historic house in Maine, United States

- U.S. National Register of Historic Places
- Location within Maine Location within the United States
- Location: Lighthouse Road, Bass Harbor, Maine
- Coordinates: 44.2288°N 68.3394°W
- Area: 19.5 acres (7.9 ha)
- Built: 1947
- Built by: Ruth Moore, Eleanor Mayo
- NRHP reference No.: 04001050
- Added to NRHP: September 22, 2004

The Moore–Mayo House is a historic residence located on Lighthouse Road in Bass Harbor, a village within the town of Tremont, Maine. The vernacular-style structure was begun in 1947 by authors Ruth Moore and Eleanor Mayo, who lived and wrote there until their respective deaths in 1989 and 1981. Moore is often noted as an influential mid-20th-century writer depicting aspects of Maine’s culture. The property was listed on the National Register of Historic Places in 2004.

== Description and history ==
The Moore-Mayo House is set on the west side of Lighthouse Road, on a property which extends down to the shore. The main house is set near the road, sheltered from it by a lilac hedge. Overgrown fields extend down to the shore, where there is a small wood-frame "camp" cabin with deck. The main house is a single-story vernacular wood-frame structure, which grew organically over time as the two women expanded it. It has a main square component at its center, with wings added to the west and south sides. These sections are each covered by a gable roof whose rafter ends are exposed.

The core of the house was built in 1947 by Ruth Moore and Eleanor Mayo, with help from Mayo's father Frederick. Architectural elements of the house were recycled from an old Civilian Conservation Corps camp site, second-hand materials, and beach-combed lumber. The structure was fitted with plumbing and electricity in 1948, and the two wings were added over the following years. The floors and walls are finished in pine, and there are builtin pine cabinets in the kitchen and bedrooms. The camp at the shore was built in 1962.

Ruth Moore (1903–89) and Eleanor Mayo (1920-81) were both born in the area, and met in 1940. Moore had already been published by then, but her major critical success followed. She was lauded critically by contemporaries and later commentators for her social commentary, wit and language in writing, and her depictions of rural Maine, following in some degree the trail blazed by Sarah Orne Jewett and others. Mayo published five novels before becoming involved in local politics; she was the first woman to serve on the Tremont board of selectmen.

== See also ==
- National Register of Historic Places listings in Hancock County, Maine
