= Eleanor Mayo =

American politician

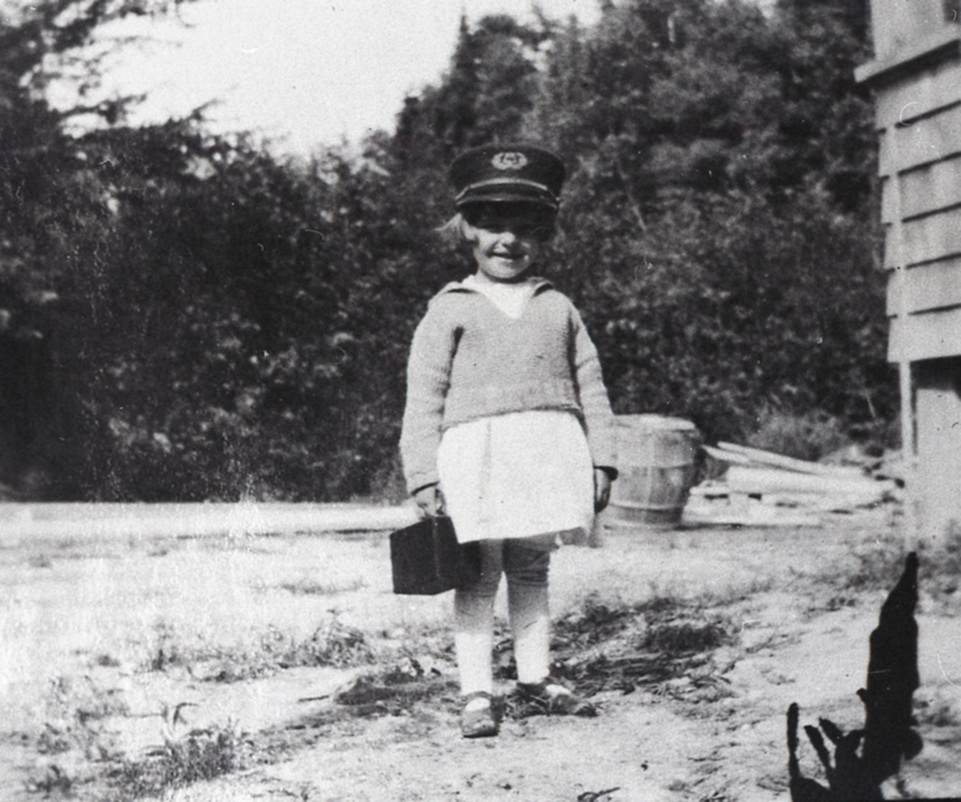
Eleanor Ruth Mayo at 4 years old in Southeast Harbor, Maine.

Eleanor Mayo (1920–1981) was an American mid-twentieth-century novelist. She spent most of her life on Mount Desert Island, Maine. Raised in Southwest Harbor, Maine, Mayo was the long-time partner and companion of fellow Maine novelist Ruth Moore.

== Personal life ==
Mayo was introduced to well known Maine novelist Ruth Moore in the summer of 1940 by the latter's sister who had been Mayo's high school teacher. They soon fell in love and became a couple. Mayo accompanied Moore on her return to California. The two soon moved to New York City where they remained until returning permanently to Maine in 1947.

== Career ==
Mayo published five novels during her life. Mayo's novel Turn Home was made into the 1950 film Tarnished. Mayo was active in local politics holding several elected positions in Tremont, Maine. She was the first female selectman elected in Tremont, and later served many years as the town's tax assessor. Ruth Moore wrote of the stir caused by Mayo's election: "A great flurry it got in all the papers and on the radio, and all the old diehards and shellbacks in town, who think 'wimmen's fit fa one thing and that's all, by God,' are standing on their heads and spinning."

== Photograph Collection ==
Although Mayo is known as an author, she was also an amateur photographer and dedicated time to collecting and copying the photographs of her neighbors and the residents of Mount Desert Island with the intention of using them to illustrate the history of Tremont that she was writing. The project was not completed before her death, but the Eleanor R. Mayo Collection has over 700 negatives, articles and personal notes by Mayo which document information about the photographs themselves. The collection, housed in a wooden box carved by Mayo, was given to the Southwest Harbor Public Library by Eleanor’s companion, Ruth Moore, after Mayo's death most likely in 1988.

== Later life ==
The house built in 1947 by Mayo and Moore was listed on the National Register of Historic Places in 2004, recognizing their literary accomplishments. Mayo was diagnosed with brain cancer in 1978 at the age of 58 and died at age 60 on January 30, 1981, in Ellsworth, Maine. Eleanor is buried in Mount Height Cemetery, Southwest Harbor, Maine.

== Bibliography ==
- Turn Home (1945)
- Loom of the Land (1946)
- October Fire (1951)
- Swan's Harbor (1953)
- Forever Stranger (1958)
- When Foley Craddock Tore Off my Grandfather's Thumb: The Collected Stories of Ruth Moore and Eleanor Mayo (2004) ISBN 978-0-942396-92-8
