= Thurston's Lobster Pound =

Restaurant in Bernard, Maine, U.S.

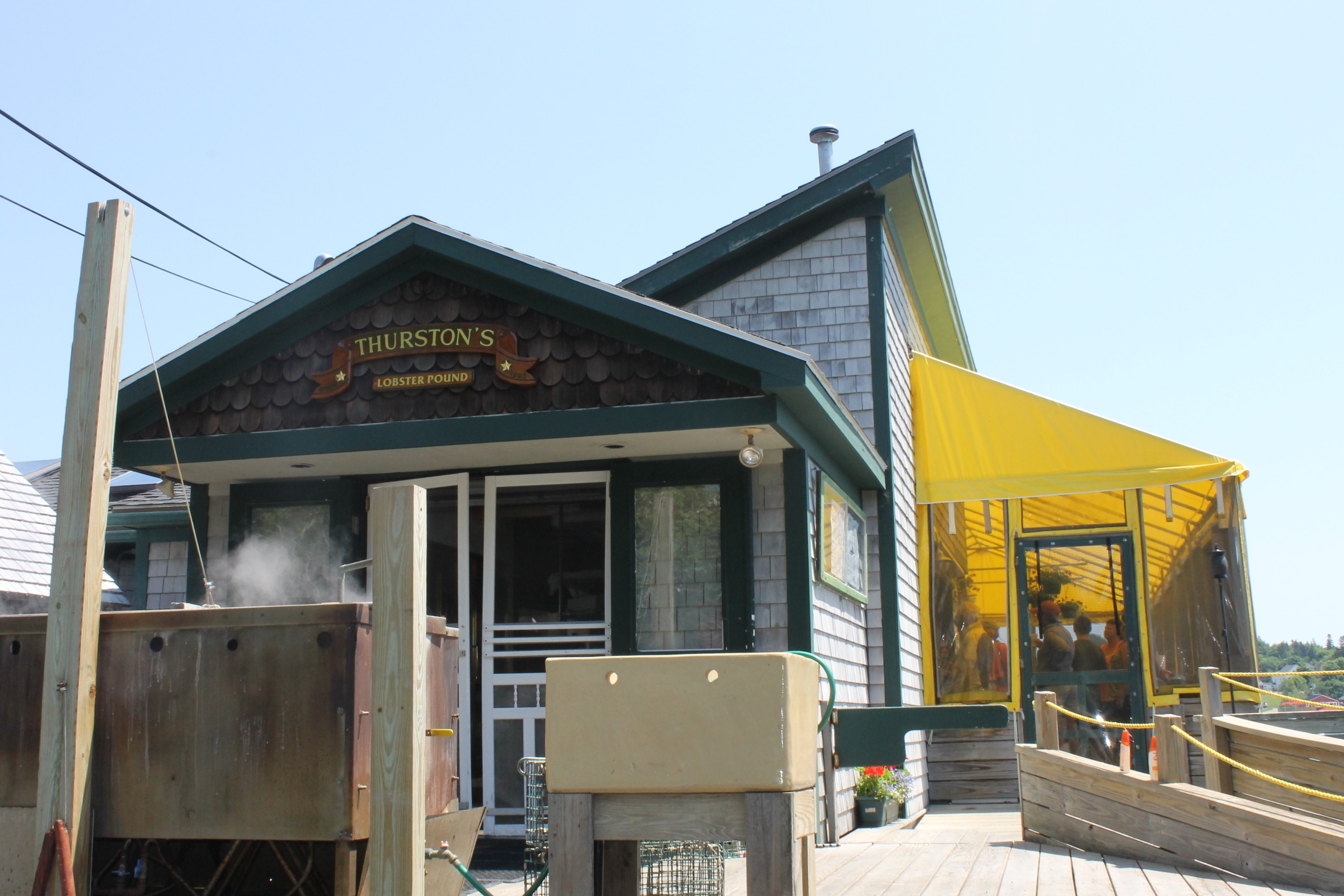
- The kitchen (left) and main entrance in 2014
- Interactive map of Thurston's Lobster Pound

Restaurant information
- Established: 1993 (33 years ago)
- Owner: Radcliffe family
- Location: 9 Thurston Road, Bernard, Hancock County, Maine, 04612, United States
- Coordinates: 44.23918215°N 68.35249619°W
- Website: www.thurstonforlobster.com

Thurston's Lobster Pound is a seafood restaurant in Bernard, Maine, United States. Situated on Thurston Road, a cul-de-sac off Steamboat Wharf Road, overlooking Bass Harbor from the west, it has been in business since 1993. Its most popular dish is lobster.

== History ==
Established in 1993 and owned by the Radcliffe family, it was a progression of the original F. W. Thurston Company, started in 1946 by Fred Webster Thurston. Thurston's daughter, Audrey, and her husband, Harvey Moore, became partners in the business two years later.

Thurston died in 1959, and left his half of the business to his grandson, Lester Radcliffe.

Harvey died in 1971, at which point Radcliffe purchased the remaining half of the business from his mother. He remained the sole proprietor for the following two decades.

Michael Radcliffe, Lester's son, and his wife, Elizabeth, purchased F. W. Thurston in 1991. They expanded the business two years later with Thurston's Lobster Pound.

After thirteen summer seasons, the Radcliffes leased the business to an employee between 2006 and 2012, at which point, with the help of their daughter, Christina, they took control again.
