= Deep Waters (1948 film) =

1948 drama film directed by Henry King

- Theatrical release poster
- Directed by: Henry King
- Screenplay by: Richard Murphy
- Based on: Spoonhandle; 1946 novel by Ruth Moore
- Produced by: Samuel G. Engel
- Starring: Dana Andrews; Jean Peters; Cesar Romero; Dean Stockwell; Anne Revere
- Cinematography: Joseph LaShelle
- Edited by: Barbara McLean
- Music by: Cyril J. Mockridge
- Distributed by: 20th Century Fox
- Release date: July 22, 1948
- Running time: 85 minutes
- Country: United States
- Language: English

Deep Waters is a 1948 American drama film directed by Henry King and starring Dana Andrews, Jean Peters and Cesar Romero. The film is based on the 1946 novel Spoonhandle written by Ruth Moore and was nominated for a 1949 Oscar for Best Special Effects (specifically, for the storm at sea sequence), but lost to Portrait of Jennie.

The film was released in the UK in 1949, a year after its American theatrical release.

== Plot ==
Because he has given up his study of architecture to become a fisherman, State of Maine social worker Ann Freeman breaks her engagement to Hod Stillwell, explaining that she could never bear being constantly concerned about his safety. In this same period, she convinces her friend Mary McKay to take in 12-year-old orphan Donny Mitchell, whose father and uncle died at sea. Longing for the sea, Donny has run away several times. Ann hopes the tough but fair Mary will bring some discipline into his life.

The following day, Donny befriends Hod while hunting. Soon after, Hod, returning from a fishing trip on his boat with his partner, Portuguese Joe Sanger, discovers Donny on his lobster bank, having rowed out to it in a dingy and stolen two of Hod's lobsters, without knowing they belonged to Hod and Joe. Hod gives him a good telling off and returns him home to Mary and suggests that she let Donny work for him on his boat on Saturdays. She agrees and Donny is very happy out at sea on the boat and even catches a large halibut, his share of the catch earning him $5.75. This worries Ann, who has recently witnessed her friend Molly Thatcher's loss of her husband to the sea and she threatens to move the boy to an inland family if Hod allows Donny to go out to sea on his boat again. Reluctantly, Hod follows Ann's advice and tells Donny he cannot work for him any longer and that their partnership is ended.

Very upset and feeling betrayed and rejected by Hod, Donny stands on the jetty and watches the boat go off into the distance without him, before going into town and stealing a camera from a drug store and selling it to make enough money for him to run away from home again and return to the sea. He steals a boat and puts to sea, but is caught in a terrible storm and has to be rescued by Hod and Joe. Realizing that she cannot prohibit Donny from being near the sea, Ann allows him to return to work for Hod. Donny goes to Hod and tells him the good news and Hod agrees to let Donny go out with him on his boat again.

Happy beyond words, Donny runs home to tell Ann and Mary the good news, but as he runs into the house, he notices the local sheriff and the owner of the second hand shop to whom Donny sold the stolen camera are awaiting him. Ashamed, Donny admits the theft and begs Ann and Mary not to tell Hod he is being sent away to a reform school, fearing Hod will not want to see him anymore.

Hod soon asks Ann about Donny's whereabouts. Ann does not tell him. Hod starts to investigate and finds out that Donny is in a reform school. Not wanting Donny to be in this situation, Hod prompts the state to let him adopt Donny. Donny initially refuses the adoption, ashamed of what he had done. However, when he finds out Hod is not mad at him, he allows himself to be reunited with him and he returns home accompanied by Hod and Ann.

== Cast ==
- Dana Andrews as Hod Stillwell
- Jean Peters as Ann Freeman
- Dean Stockwell as Donny Mitchell
- Cesar Romero as Joe Sanger
- Anne Revere as Mary McKay
- Ed Begley as Josh Hovey
- Leona Powers as Mrs. Freeman
- Mae Marsh as Molly Thatcher
- Will Geer as Nick Driver
- Cliff Clark as Harris
- Bruno Wick as Druggist
- Harry Tyler as Hopkins
- Raymond Greenleaf as Judge Taylor

== Production ==
In December 1946, 20th Century Fox bought the rights to the novel Spoonhandle by Ruth Moore in order to produce a film adaption. Initially, Louis de Rochemont was assigned to produce and Mark Stevens was set to star.

Filming took place during late 1947, in the original Maine locations of the story.

== Legacy ==
Deep Waters was broadcast over WTCG in Atlanta, Georgia, United States, as the station was uplinked to the Satcom 1 satellite at 1 p.m. Eastern Time on December 17, 1976, becoming the first true superstation (and later evolving into cable channel TBS). The movie started over the Atlanta signal 30 minutes prior to the uplink.
