= Elaine Lorillard =

American socialite

Elaine Guthrie Lorillard
- Duke Ellington and Lorillard
- Born: Elaine Guthrie; October 11, 1914; Tremont, Maine, US
- Died: November 26, 2007 (aged 93); Newport, Rhode Island, US
- Education: New England Conservatory of Music
- Known for: Newport Jazz Festival
- Spouse: Louis Lorillard (m. 1946; div. 1962)
- Children: 2

Elaine Guthrie Lorillard (October 11, 1914 – November 26, 2007) was an American socialite who founded the Newport Jazz Festival with her husband, Louis Lorillard.

== Early life ==
Elaine Guthrie was born in Tremont, Maine, to Walter Edward Guthrie and Eliza Pray Guthrie. After attending Phillips Exeter Academy and Harvard, and serving in World War I, Walter founded the family printing company in Boston. Eliza, called Lida, was a classical singer.

Guthrie attended the New England Conservatory of Music, and in 1943 she joined the Red Cross where she taught piano and painting to orphans in Naples, Italy. In Naples she met Louis Livingston Lorillard (1919–1986), a United States Army lieutenant. While serving in Naples, Guthrie and Lorillard shared an interest in listening to jazz, which they had experienced in New York City.

== Newport Jazz Festival ==
In 1953, Guthrie and Lorillard visited the Storyville nightclub in Boston with her brother, Thomas T. Guthrie, and his friend, Professor Borne from Boston University. They met George Wein, who founded and managed the nightclub, and they discussed the possibility of bringing an outdoor jazz concert to Newport, Rhode Island, where they lived.

With the guidance of John Hammond and George Avakian, two record producers and executives at Columbia Records, they came up with a list of performers. With a $20,000 grant from the Lorillards, the first Newport Jazz Festival took place in July 1954, attracting 11,000 fans. The Lorillards supported the festival until 1961. The Lorillards said that the festival was founded as a nonprofit organization.

=== Biopic ===
The movie High Society (1956), with a storyline by family friend Cleveland Amory, adapted The Philadelphia Story (film) as a musical set in Newport during the jazz festival. Grace Kelly was rumored to have been cast for her resemblance to Elaine Lorillard. The movie was filmed in Newport with scenes from the Lorillards' life, from a convertible passing their house, "Quatrel" on Bellevue Avenue, to their daughter sitting at their piano with Louis Armstrong.

== Personal life ==
In 1946, she married Louis Livingston Lorillard (1919–1986). Louis was a descendant of Robert Livingston, first Lord of Livingston Manor, and Pierre Lorillard, who founded the P. Lorillard Company in 1760. Before their 1962 divorce, they had two children:

- Edith Pray Lorillard, who married military historian Robert Cowley, son of writer Malcolm Cowley, in 1978.
- Pierre Livingston Lorillard

Lorillard died in the Heatherwood Nursing and Rehabilitation Center in Newport, where she had been treated for pneumonia/MRSA at the age of 93.
