= Bass Harbor Head Light =

Lighthouse on Mount Desert Island, Maine, US

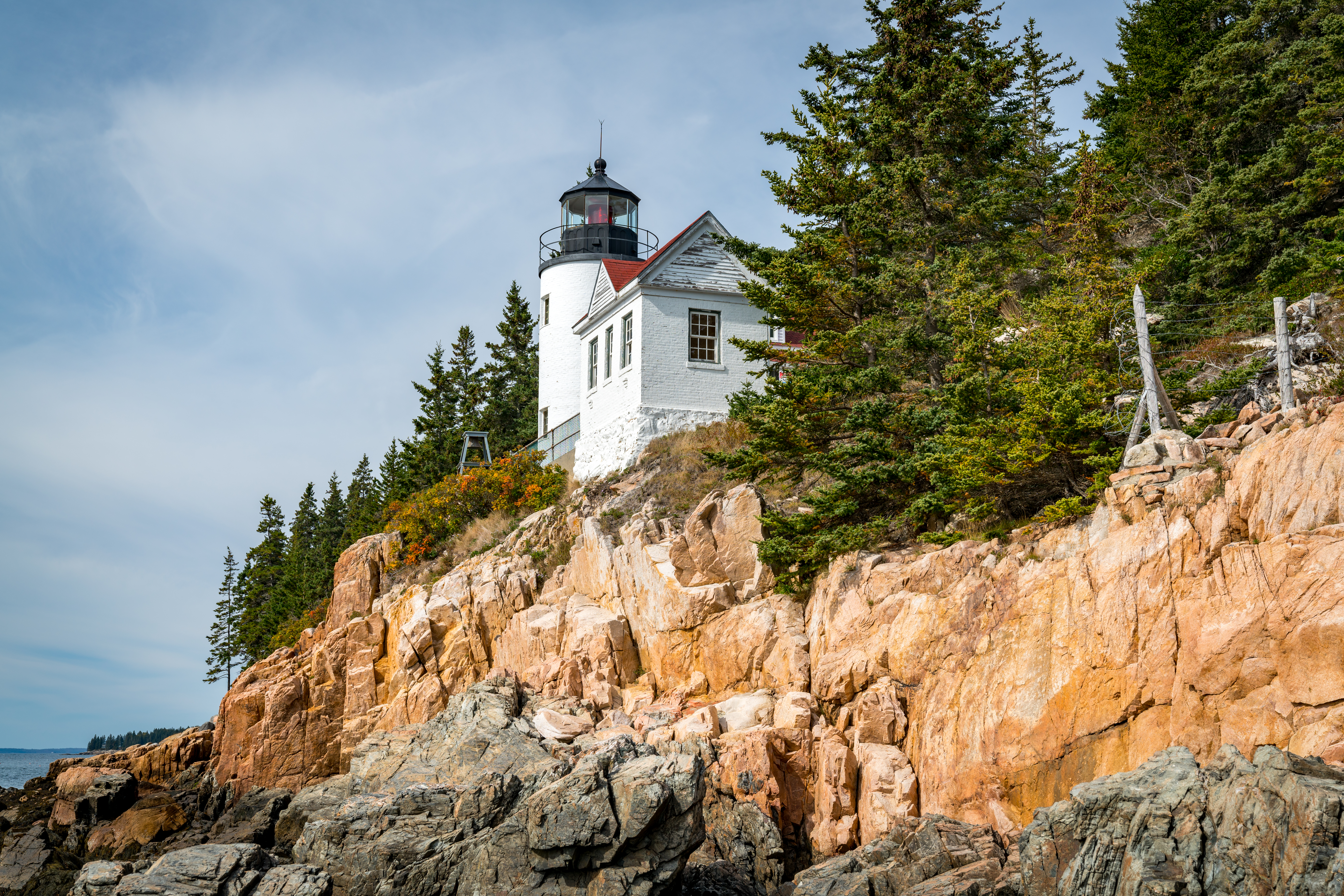
- Location: Tremont, Maine
- Coordinates: 44°13′18.5″N 68°20′14.2″W

Tower
- Constructed: 1858
- Foundation: Stone
- Construction: Brick
- Automated: 1974
- Height: 10 m (33 ft)
- Shape: Cylindrical tower
- Markings: White with black marking
- Heritage: National Register of Historic Places listed place
- Fog signal: none

Light
- First lit: 1858
- Focal height: 56 feet (17 m)
- Lens: Fourth Order Fresnel lens
- Range: 13 nautical miles (24 km; 15 mi)
- Characteristic: Occulting red, 4s (Oc R 4s)
- Bass Harbor Head Light Station
- U.S. National Register of Historic Places
- U.S. Historic district
- Nearest city: Bass Harbor, Maine
- Area: 2.5 acres (1.0 ha)
- Architect: US Army Corps of Engineers
- MPS: Light Stations of Maine MPS
- NRHP reference No.: 87002273
- Added to NRHP: January 21, 1988

Bass Harbor Head Light is a lighthouse located within Acadia National Park in the southwest portion of Mount Desert Island, Maine, marking the entrance to Bass Harbor and Blue Hill Bay.

== History ==
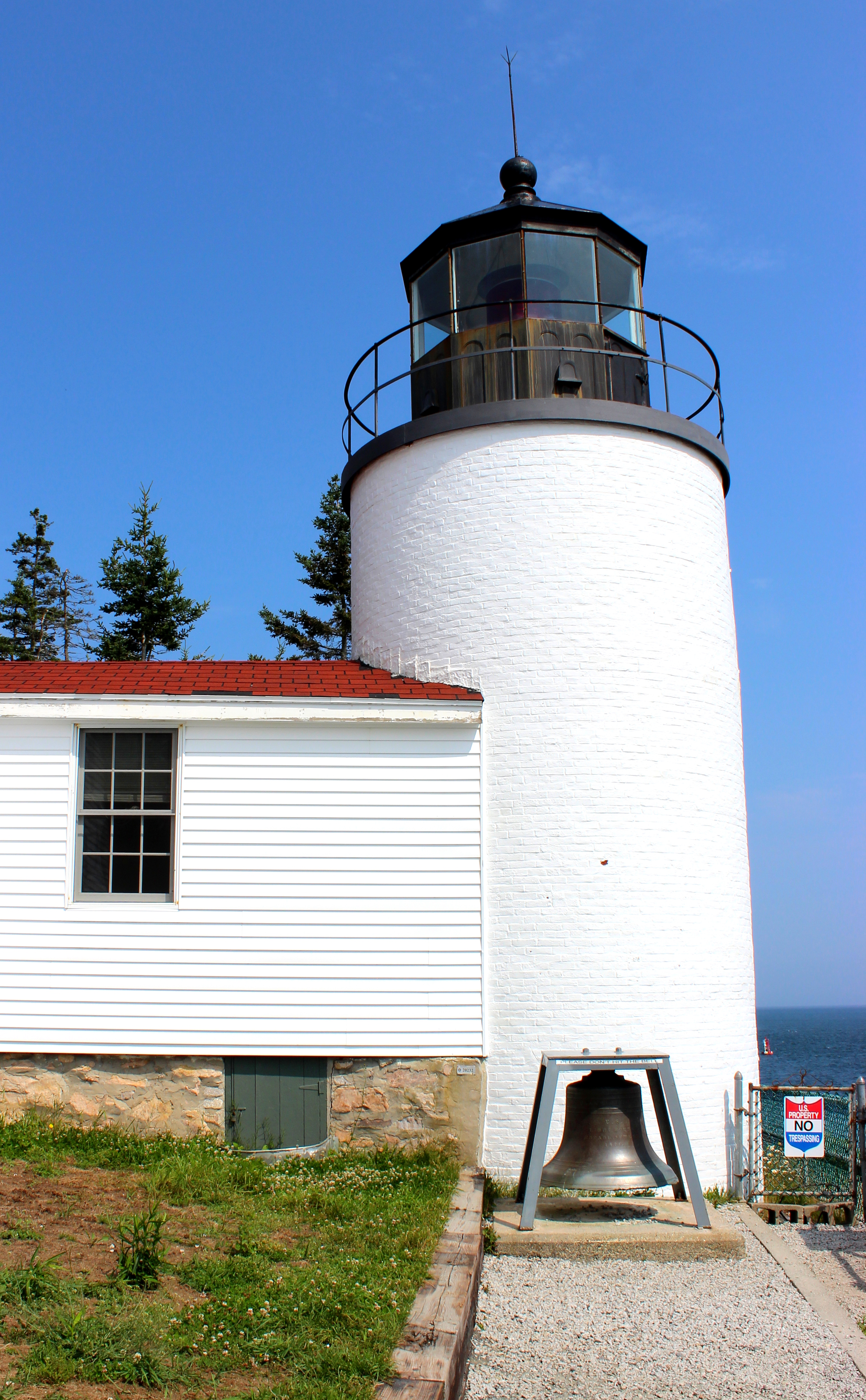
Bell at base of tower

The history of Bass Harbor Head Light dates to 1855, when it was determined that there was sufficient reason for a lighthouse at the mouth of Bass Harbor. In 1855, the U.S. Congress appropriated $5,000 for construction of the lighthouse. In 1876, construction was completed on a fog bell and tower, since removed. A much larger 4,000-pound (1,800 kg) bell was placed inside the tower in 1898. The house of the lightkeeper remains in its original configuration with the exception of a 10-foot (3.0 m) addition that was added in 1900. The lighthouse was added to the National Register of Historic Places as Bass Harbor Head Light Station on January 21, 1988, reference number 87002273.

In 1902, an oil storage house constructed of brick was built 205 feet (62 m) northwest of the lighthouse.

Bass Harbor's fifth order Fresnel lens was replaced in 1902 with a larger fourth order. This lens was manufactured by the French company Henry-Lepaute. This lens remains in service today.

== Viewing ==
Today, the house is a private residence for a local Coast Guard member and his family. Tourists can get close to the bell and light via a concrete path, but most of the grounds remain private. There is a short walk which takes one to a series of wooden steps that lead down onto the many granite boulders that provide a great view of the harbor side of the lighthouse.

== Keepers ==
- John Thurston (1858–1861)
- John Rick (1861–1865)
- John Wilson (1865–1869)
- Charles B. Gilley (1869–1872)
- James L. Wilson (1872–1880)
- C. F. Chase (1880–1890)
- William T. Holbrook (1890–1894)
- Willis Dolliver (1894–1912)
- Joseph M. Gray (c. 1921–1938)
- Elmer Reed (1938–1940)
- Leverett Stanley (1940–1950)
- Eugene L. Coleman (1950–1955)
- Morton M. Dyer (1955–1957)
- Cecil A. Mareno (1960s)
- Walter D. Moulton (U.S. Coast Guard, 1962–1963)

== See also ==
- National Register of Historic Places listings in Hancock County, Maine
- National Register of Historic Places listings in Acadia National Park
