= John F. Bickford =

- Civil War era Navy Medal of Honor
- Born: March 12, 1843; Tremont, Maine, US
- Died: April 28, 1927 (aged 84)
- Burial place: Mount Pleasant Cemetery, Gloucester, Massachusetts
- Military career
- Allegiance: United States of America; Union
- Branch: United States Navy; Union Navy
- Service years: 1862 - 1865
- Rank: Master's Mate
- Conflicts: Battle of Cherbourg (1864)
- Awards: Medal of Honor

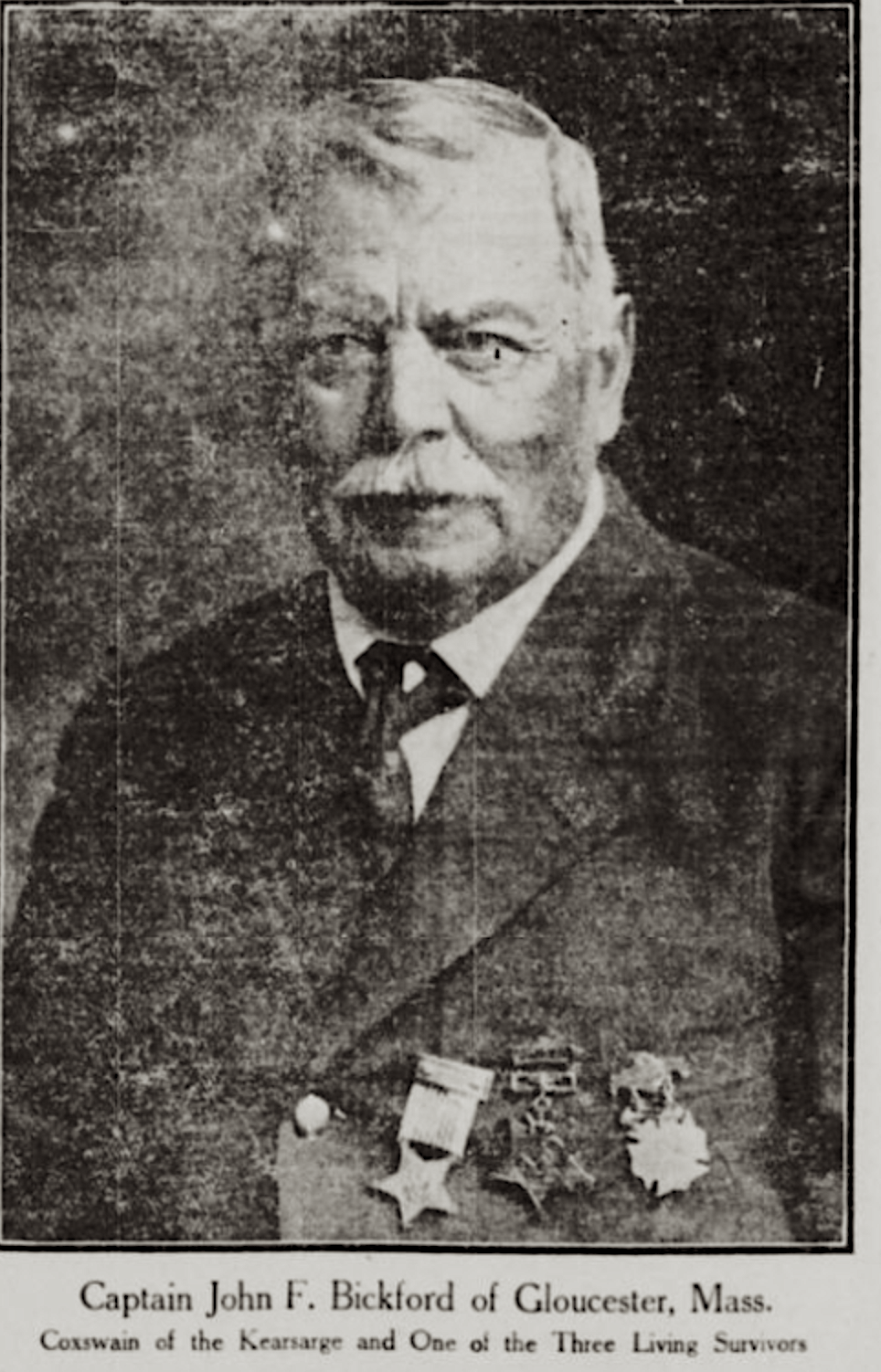
Photo of John Bickford from the Boston evening transcript 21 June 1922. Captain Bickford's reminiscences of his role in the battle between the Kearsarge and the Alabama.

John F. Bickford (March 12, 1843 – April 28, 1927) received the Medal of Honor in the American Civil War.

== Biography ==
Bickford was born in Tremont, Maine, and joined the Navy from Boston, Massachusetts in January 1862. He rose to the rank of captain of the top (roughly equivalent to the modern day rank of petty officer) and was assigned to the USS Kearsarge. He participated in the Kearsarge's historic engagement with the CSS Alabama on June 19, 1864. Bickford later received the Medal of Honor for heroism during this battle.

After the battle, he was promoted to Acting Master's Mate in July 1864. He was discharged from the Navy in June 1865.

He was a companion of the Naval Order of the United States.

Bickford died on April 28, 1927. He is buried at Mount Pleasant Cemetery in Gloucester, Massachusetts.

== Medal of Honor citation ==
Rank and organization: Captain of the Top, U.S. Navy. Born: 1843, Tremont, Maine. Accredited to: Maine. G.O. No.: 45, December 31, 1864.

Citation:

Served on board the U.S.S. Kearsarge when she destroyed the Alabama off Cherbourg, France, June 19, 1864. Acting as the first loader of the pivot gun during this bitter engagement Bickford exhibited marked coolness and good conduct and was highly recommended for his gallantry under fire by his divisional officer.

== See also ==
- List of American Civil War Medal of Honor recipients: A–F
