= Bass Harbor Memorial Library =

- U.S. National Register of Historic Places
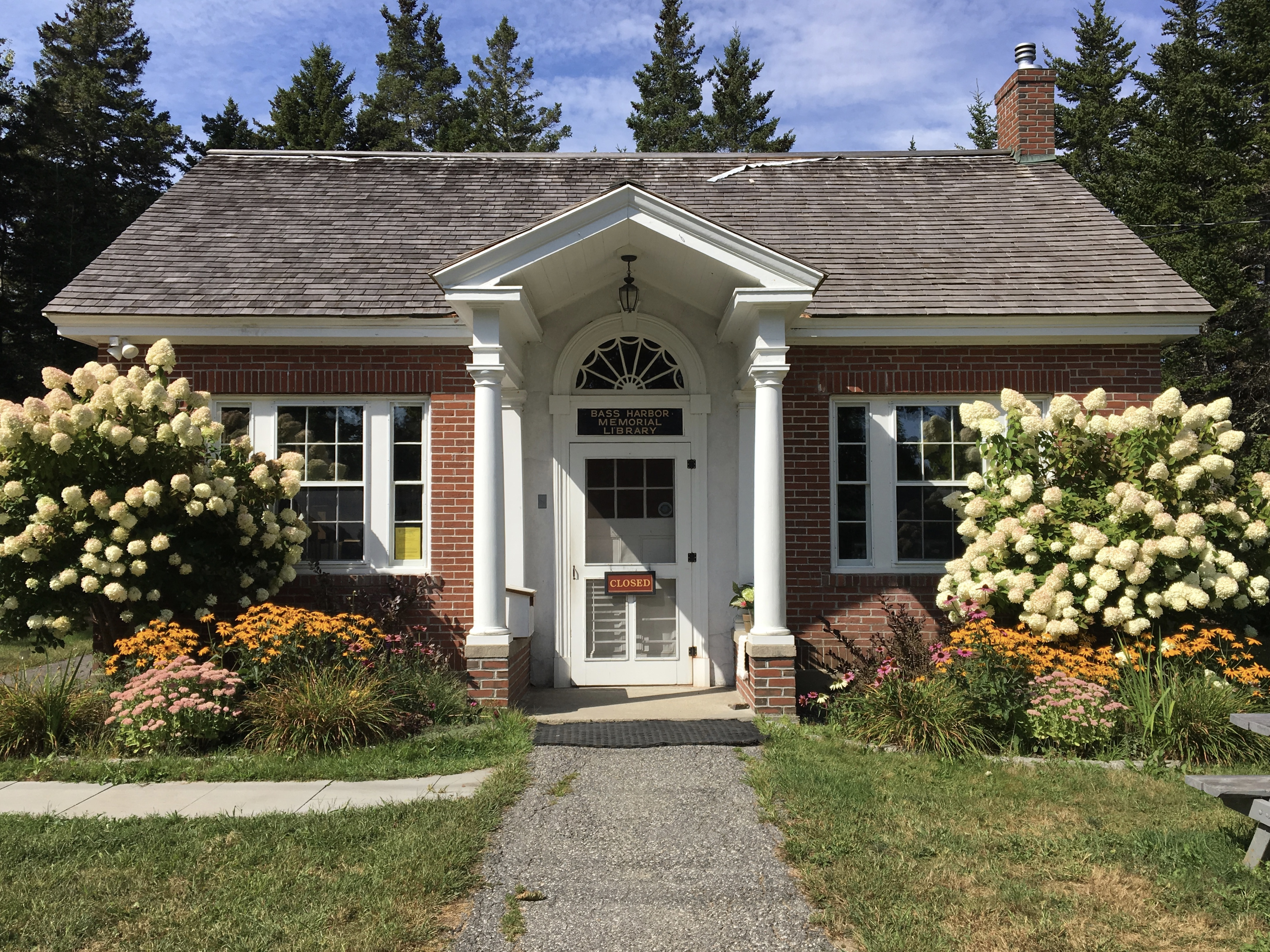

- Location within Maine Location within the United States
- Location: 89 Bernard Rd., Tremont, Maine
- Coordinates: 44°14′30″N 68°21′25″W
- Area: less than one acre
- Built: 1922
- Built by: Charles Lawson
- Architectural style: Colonial Revival
- NRHP reference No.: 09000593
- Added to NRHP: August 5, 2009

The Bass Harbor Memorial Library is the public library of Tremont, Maine. It is located at 89 Bernard Road in the village of Bernard, in an historically significant Colonial Revival building built in 1922 with funds donated by Tremont native Rhoda M. Watson. The building was listed on the National Register of Historic Places in 2009.

== Architecture and history ==
The library building has two parts, a main block constructed of brick in 1922 and a rear extension framed in wood and built in 1991. The main block is laid in running bond above a row of soldier bricks laid on the concrete foundation, and is topped by a side gable roof. The main facade, facing east, has a central projecting gable-roofed portico supported by modified Doric pilasters and columns. The main wall under the portico, surrounding the entrance, is stuccoed. The wooden door is topped by a semicircular fanlight set in moulded trim. The rear wood-frame addition is more utilitarian, and is clad in vinyl siding.

The main entrance leads into a vestibule, and then a reading room which occupies the entire brick 1922 structure. It has a barrel-vaulted ceiling, and its walls are finished in dark-stained beaded boarding. The rear half of the building houses the library stacks, offices, and other modern facilities.

The history of the Tremont public library begins with a private collection of books made available by Mrs. Vesta McRae, probably from her own home. This collection grew to about 1200 volumes by 1920. The 1922 portion of the present building was designed by an unknown architect, and was funded by Rhoda M. Watson, a Tremont native who was memorializing her late husband Edwin, an industrialist from Leicester, Massachusetts, and was formally accepted by the town the following year. It is possible that the builder, Charles Lawson, was also its designer; he was Rhoda Watson's brother. Its construction took place at a time when many public libraries were underwritten by charitable gifts, and when libraries were seen as an important aspect of a community's educational offerings.

== See also ==
- National Register of Historic Places listings in Hancock County, Maine
