= Ruth Moore =

American novelist

Ruth Moore, April 1956, Photographer Unknown.

Ruth Moore (1903–1989) was an important Maine writer of the twentieth century. She is best known for her honest portrayals of Maine people and evocative descriptions of the state. Now primarily thought of as a regional writer, Moore was a significant literary figure on the national stage during her career. Her second novel Spoonhandle spent fourteen weeks on the New York Times bestseller list in the company of George Orwell, W. Somerset Maugham and Robert Penn Warren. In her time, Moore was hailed as "New England's only answer to Faulkner".

== Life ==
The Moore Homestead on Gotts Island, Maine, c. 1910. Photographer unknown.

Moore's family first settled the Maine midcoast region in the late 18th century. She was born in 1903 on Gotts Island, a small island just off the southwestern tip of Mount Desert Island, Maine. Moore attended Albany State Teacher's College (now SUNY Albany) and majored in English and economics. In 1926, Moore moved to New York City where she worked as personal secretary to Mary White Ovington, one of the founders of the NAACP. Ovington had spent many summers at her brother's cottage on Gotts Island and had gotten to know the Moore family. In 1929 Moore accepted a position as Assistant Campaign Manager with the NAACP working directly for the organization's head James Weldon Johnson. In the summer of 1930, she traveled to the south as an NAACP investigator, where she successfully unearthed evidence that led to the freeing of two African American youths falsely accused of murder.

Moore's first published work, a poem "Voyage", appeared in a 1929 issue of the Saturday Review of Literature. Moore returned to Maine in late 1930. She enrolled in a master's program at the University of Maine, but left after one semester and returned to New York City. From 1932 to 1935, Moore worked as assistant to Dr. John Haynes Holmes, a prominent minister and associate of Ovington's. In 1935, the novelist Alice Tisdale Hobart hired Moore. She moved with the Hobarts, first to Washington, D.C., then to Berkeley California.

During a visit to Maine in 1940, Moore's sister introduced her to Eleanor Mayo. Mayo accompanied Moore on her return to California with the intention of attending the University of California. The two would remain together until Mayo's death from a brain tumor in 1981. Moore and Mayo moved back to the East Coast in 1941. After a brief stay on Gotts Island, the couple moved to New York City. Moore quickly found a job at Reader's Digest. Moore's debut novel, The Weir, was published in 1943. Her story "It Don't Change Much" was published in The New Yorker in 1945.

In 1946, Moore followed her earlier success with her sophomore novel, Spoonhandle. She sold the film rights to 20th Century Fox. The film, retitled Deep Waters, was filmed on location in Vinalhaven, Maine and released in 1948. The sale of Spoonhandle gave Moore the financial success she needed to return to Maine. She and Mayo purchased land on the west side of Mount Desert Island and set about building their house. Though the couple traveled extensively, they never again moved away from their beloved Maine. By 1979, Moore had published 13 novels including The Walk Down Main Street (1960), The Sea Flower (1965), and The Gold and Silver Hooks (1969). She also published 3 books of poetry—one of which, Cold as a Dog and the Wind Northeast, was published by folklorist and singer-songwriter Gordon Bok of Camden, Maine.

Moore died in nearby Bar Harbor in December 1989.

== The regional label ==
For much of her literary life, Moore resisted being classified as a "regional" author. In a 1980 letter to author Sanford Phippen, she described "regional" as one of only two dirty words — the other being "interview." In the same letter, she stressed her belief that Maine "is a microcosm of everywhere else." Editor Sven Davisson writes in the introduction to Foley Craddock, "[Moore] was a regional writer only in the sense that one could call Faulkner regional, in that he wrote of his 'postage stamp of soil.' Both writers had the gift of capturing the universal in the local... A novel about New York City or Chicago is ever and always about New York City or Chicago, while a novel about Maine or Jefferson, Mississippi, in adept hands, could be about any place in the world."

== Assessment of her writing ==
Though lauded by the reviewers of the New York Herald and Saturday Review, Moore drew mixed reviews from the New York Times. Eventually the Times quit reviewing her books.. Her book sales came, for the most part, from book clubs and through serialization in magazines. Her book sales diminished appreciably within her lifetime, and Moore was eventually dropped by her publisher. Today her books are re-printed by a small press in Maine, and her books are often sold in Maine book and souvenir shops.

== Bibliography ==
=== Novels ===
- The Weir (1943) ISBN 978-1-944762-94-0
- Spoonhandle (1946) ISBN 978-1-944762-95-7
- The Fire Balloon (1948) ISBN 978-0-942396-78-2
- Candlemas Bay (1950) ISBN 978-0-942396-70-6
- Jeb Ellis of Candlemas Bay (1952)
- A Fair Wind Home (1953)
- Speak to the Winds (1956) ISBN 978-0-942396-54-6
- The Walk Down Maine Street (1960) ISBN 978-09-42396-56-0
- Second Growth (1962)
- The Sea Flower (1964)
- The Gold and Silver Hooks (1969)
- "Lizzie" & Caroline (1972)
- Dinosaur Bite (1976)
- Sarah Walked Over the Mountain (1979)

=== Poetry ===
- Cold As a Dog and the Wind Northeast (1958)
- Time's Web: Poems by Ruth Moore (1972) ISBN 978-0-982438-91-6
- The Tired Apple Tree: Poems and Ballads (1990) ISBN 978-0-942396-59-1

=== Collections ===
- High Clouds Soaring, Storms Driving Low: The Letters of Ruth Moore (1993) ISBN 978-0-942396-66-9
- When Foley Craddock Tore Off My Grandfather's Thumb: The Collected Stories of Ruth Moore and Eleanor Mayo (2004) ISBN 978-0-942396-92-8

=== Short fiction and essays ===
- “Pennies in the Water,” The American Girl July 1942
- “The Ladies from Philadelphia,” Harper's Bazaar August 1945
- “It Don't Change Much,” The New Yorker October 1945
- “Farmer Takes a Newspaper,” The Saturday Review of Literature July 1948
- “The First Christmas Spent in the House Ruth Built,” Boston Sunday Post December 1963
- “The Lonely of Heart,” Puckerbrush Review 1989
- “How Come You're Picking My Violets,” Tuesday Weekly
- “Some Notes On Clerks of the Works,” Bar Harbor Times
- “St. Columba's Mission,” Ashé Journal 3(2) Summer 2004

== See also ==
- Moore-Mayo House
