= Southwest Harbor Public Library =

Coordinates: 44.280°N 68.3260°W

- Location: Southwest Harbor, Maine, United States
- Type: Public
- Established: 1895

Collection
- Size: 40,000

Access and use
- Circulation: 56,000
- Population served: 1,966

Other information
- Budget: $288,183
- Director: Erich Reed
- Employees: 10
- Website: www.swhplibrary.org

The Southwest Harbor Public Library is the public library serving Southwest Harbor, Maine.

The Southwest Harbor Public Library was built in 1895. On March 17, 1888 the Tremont Public Library Association was formed for the purpose of looking after books and raising funds for a permanent building. The Association's name was changed to the "Southwest Harbor Public Library." In 1893 the Library Association bought the lot of land where the library building now stands for $100.

The completed building was dedicated on October 31, 1895.

The library is one of the only libraries in Maine designated as a "Star Library" by Library Journal.
