= Bass Harbor, Maine =

Village in Maine, United States

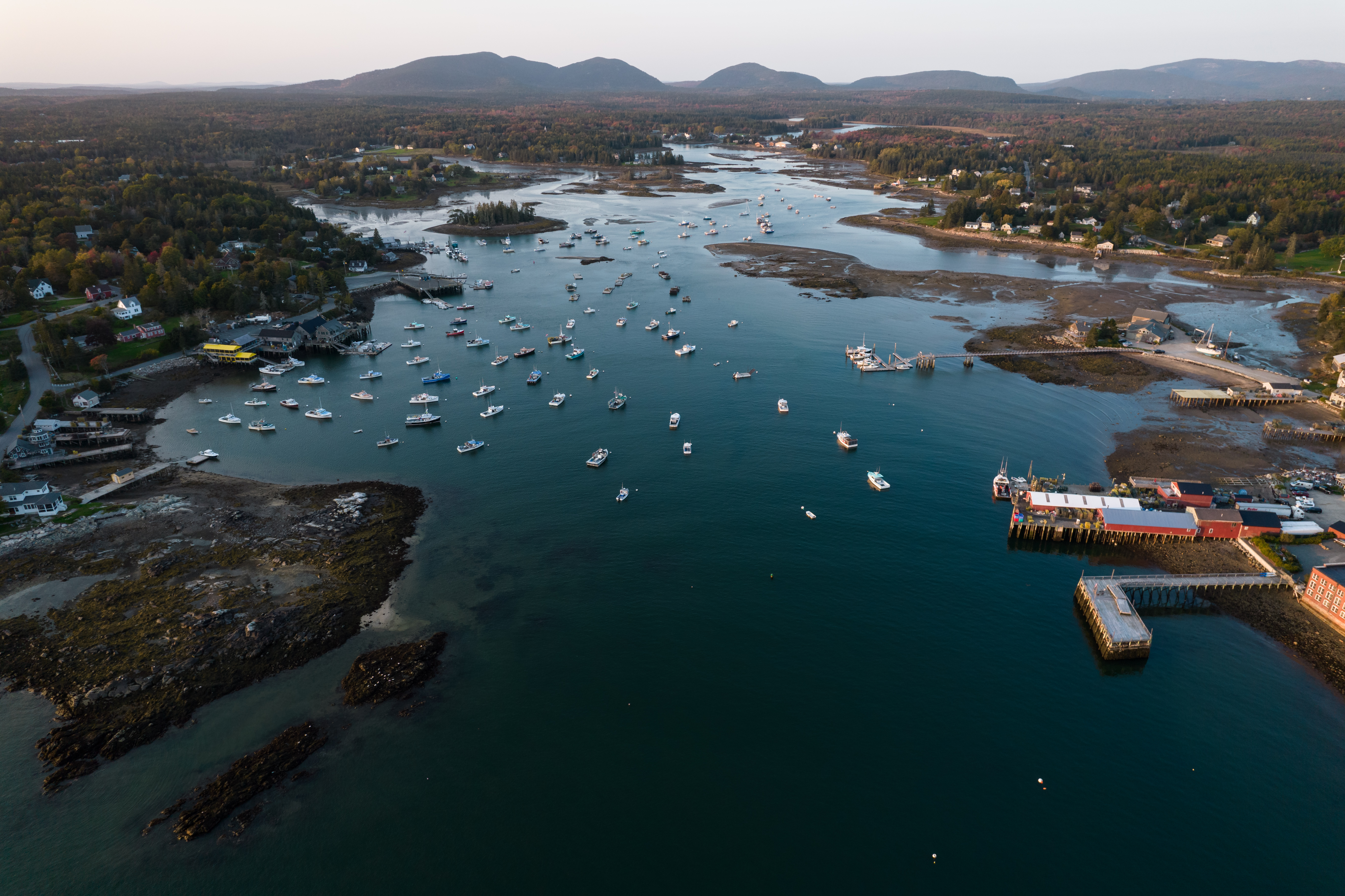
Overview of the harbor

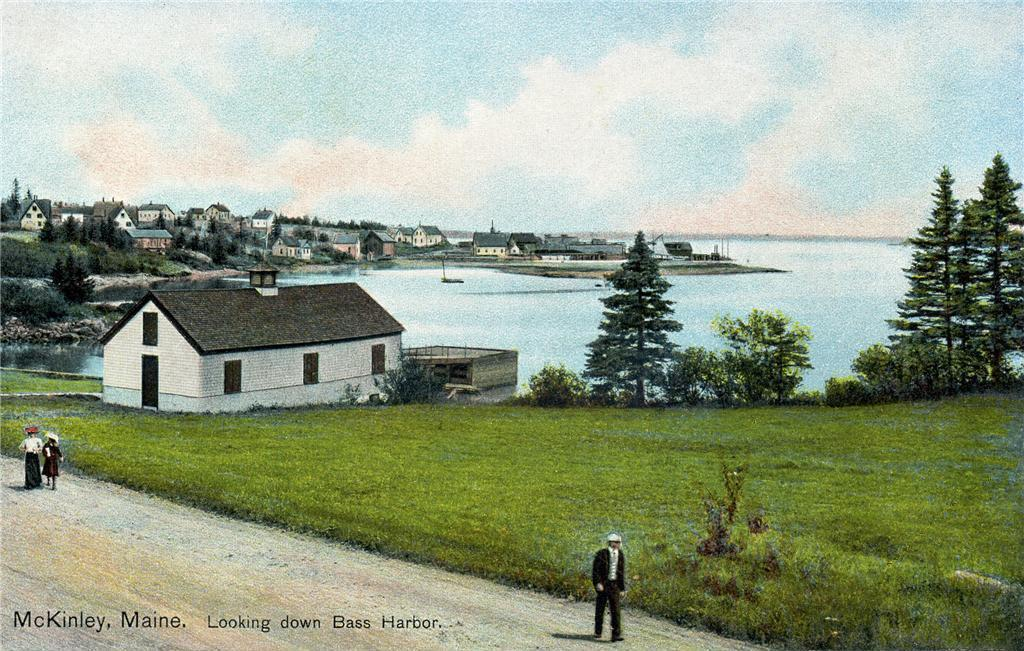
Bass Harbor, 1908

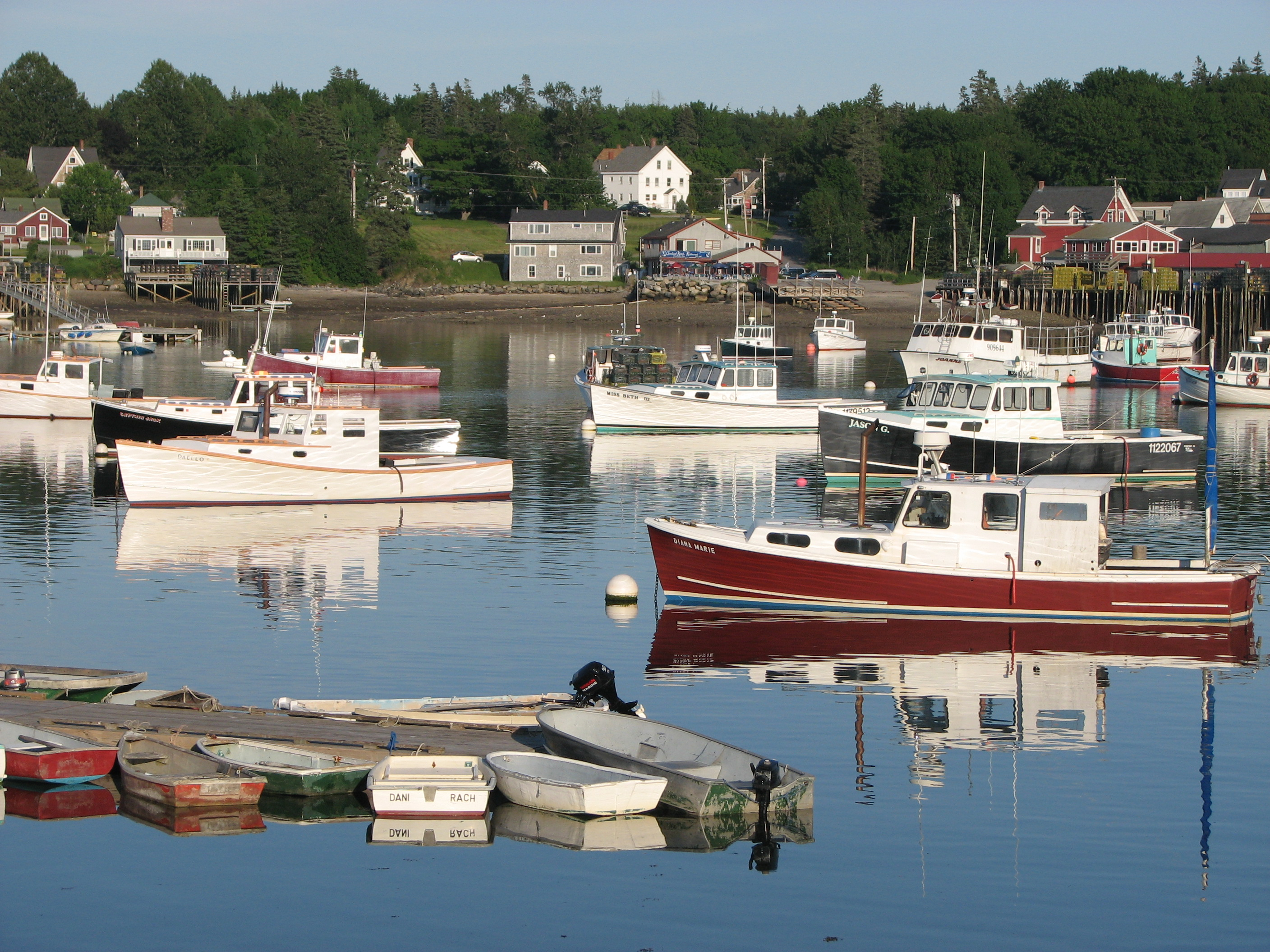
Bass Harbor, 2008

Bass Harbor (also McKinley) is a village in Hancock County, Maine, United States. It is within the town of Tremont on Mount Desert Island, and near Acadia National Park. With its well-protected natural harbor, it ranks as one of the most lucrative lobster-producing ports in the state. Bass Harbor Head Lighthouse lies at the mouth of the harbor. The village is also the departure point for Maine State Ferry Service transport to Swans Island and Frenchboro.

Bass Harbor was once known as McKinley. In the early 1900s, when a post office was built in the village, federal officials asked what the post office should be named. Someone remarked, "Name it after the president for all we care." The post office was named McKinley, and the village was known as McKinley until 1961, when residents petitioned to change the name back to Bass Harbor.

It is located at 44°14′24″N 68°20′38″W (44.2400807, -68.3439060). The ZIP Code for Bass Harbor is 04653.

== History ==
Bass Harbor is most famous for its Bass Harbor Head Lighthouse. The lighthouse was built because of an annual report by the Lighthouse Board, declaring that ships required light to assist them in entering the harbor.
